= Les Norman (lacrosse) =

Canadian lacrosse player (1939–2010)

Personal information
- Nationality: Canadian
- Born: December 2, 1939 Sexsmith, Alberta
- Died: December 2010 (aged 70–71)

Sport
- Position: Goaltender
- ICLL team: New Westminster Salmonbellies; Nanaimo Labatts
- Pro career: 1958–1971

Career highlights
- Mann Cup: 1959, 1962, 1965; NLA Championship: 1968; Mike Kelly Memorial Trophy: 1965; Commission Trophy: 1961; McDonald Trophy: 1962; Baily Trophy: 1959; Nicholson Trophy: 1961, 1962, 1965

Leslie D. "Les" Norman (December 2, 1939 in Sexsmith, Alberta – December 2010) was a Canadian professional and amateur box lacrosse goaltender. A long-time member of the New Westminster Salmonbellies franchise, Norman was a winner of three Mann Cups as a Canadian Lacrosse Champion, the 1968 National Lacrosse Association professional championship, and the 1965 Mann Cup's most valuable player. Norman was also the first goaltender to post a shutout in a Western Lacrosse Association (then ICLL) game. Les Norman was inducted into the Canadian Lacrosse Hall of Fame in 1989.

== Career ==
In 1958, Norman played for both the Senior and Junior teams in New Westminster. In the 1959 season, he was chosen to replace legend Bunny Joseph. By the end of the season, Norman was named a First Team All-Star and Rookie of the Year of the ICLL. He capped off the season by leading the O'Keefes to a 4-games-to-none Mann Cup victory over the Peterborough Mercurys. The Mercurys's legendary goaltender Moon Wootton proclaimed after the series, "That guy Norman is some goalie. He'll be getting the name I've had for some years."

In 1962, Norman, now a veteran of the team, helped the O'Keefes to a second ICLL championship and another 4-games-to-none sweep in a Mann Cup final, this time against the Brampton Ramblers. On May 3, 1962, he led the O'Keefes to a 27-save shutout over the Victoria Shamrocks, the first shutout in ICLL/WLA history.

In 1965, Norman would lead the O'Keefes to a third league title. Norman would claim his third and final Mann Cup in seven games over the Brooklin Merchants and win the Mike Kelly Memorial Trophy as the Mann Cup's most valuable player.

In 1968, Norman went professional when his Salmonbellies joined the Western Division of the National Lacrosse Association. Despite being passed over for all major awards and all-star teams and a third-place finish in the West, Norman would lead the Salmonbellies to a seven-game victory over the Vancouver Carlings and a six-game victory to knock off the first-place and Joe Comeau-less Portland Adanacs to win the West. The Salmonbellies would meet Gaylord Powless the Detroit Olympias in the NLA final and beat them four games to two.

After playing nine games in a second NLA season, Norman left lacrosse. He would return for the 1971 season and then retire. He was inducted into the Canadian Lacrosse Hall of Fame in 1989. He died in December 2010 after a short battle with brain cancer.

== Statistics ==
Source: Wamper's Bible of Lacrosse and Stan Shillington's "Who's Who in Lacrosse 1933–2013: Goaltending Records".

Season	Team	League	GP	G	A	P	PIM	Sv%	Team GAA
1958	New Westminster	ICLL	2	0	1	1	0	0.630	10.00
-	New Westminster	P/O	1	0	0	0	0	0.718	-
1959	New Westminster	ICLL	18	0	1	1	0	0.736	10.20
-	New Westminster	P/O	9	0	0	0	0	0.780	-
1960	New Westminster	ICLL	27	0	0	0	7	0.750	9.63
-	NWM/Nanaimo	P/O	6	0	1	1	2	0.761	-
1961	New Westminster	ICLL	28	0	3	3	2	0.791	8.20
-	New Westminster	P/O	5	0	0	0	0	0.677	-
1962	New Westminster	ICLL	30	0	3	3	2	0.789	8.22
-	New Westminster	P/O	16	0	2	2	2	0.797	-
1963	New Westminster	ICLL	28	0	1	1	16	0.750	8.77
-	New Westminster	P/O	8	0	0	0	10	0.695	-
1964	New Westminster	ICLL	19	0	2	2	11	0.771	9.31
-	New Westminster	P/O	7	0	2	2	0	0.753	-
1965	New Westminster	ICLL	27					0.763	
-	New Westminster	P/O	12					0.774	
1966	New Westminster	ICLL	26					0.732	
-	New Westminster	P/O	2					0.714	
1967	New Westminster	ICLL	23					0.709	
1968	New Westminster	NLA	32					0.762	
-	New Westminster	P/O	16					0.741	
1969	New Westminster	NLA	8					0.737	
1970	Did Not Participate								
1971	New Westminster	WLA	14					0.792	
-	New Westminster	P/O	4					0.767	
