= Goaltender (box lacrosse) =

Person who blocks goal in box lacrosse

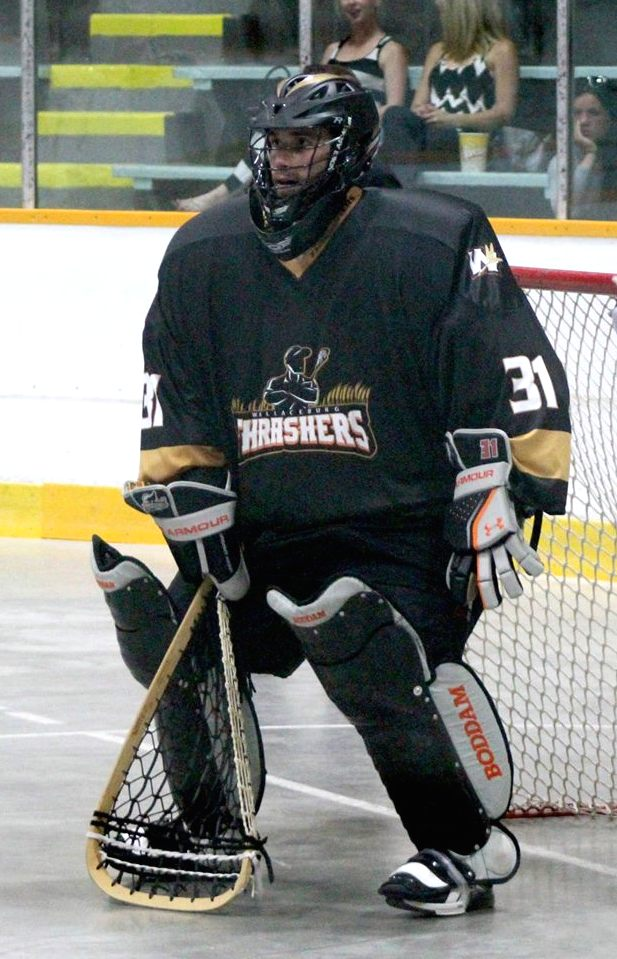
National Lacrosse League goalie Tye Belanger in Summer 2015.

The goaltender or goalie is a playing position in indoor or box lacrosse. More heavily armoured than a field lacrosse goaltender, since the invent of indoor lacrosse in 1931, the box lacrosse goalie has evolved into a much different position than its field lacrosse cousin.

== Equipment ==
In Box Lacrosse, a goaltender is typically more heavily armoured than a field lacrosse goaltender. Box lacrosse goaltenders are known for their massive upper body gear, large shin guards known as "irons", and ice hockey-style helmets.

=== Sticks and Gloves ===
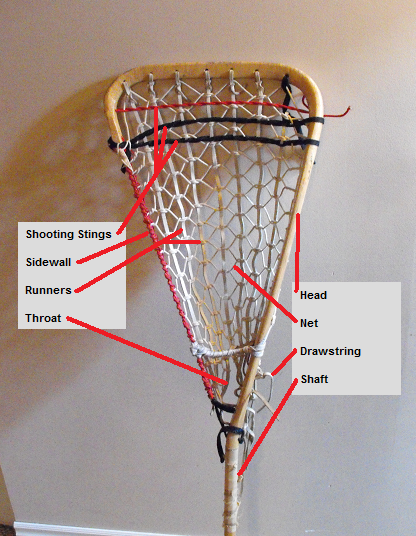
Diagram of Mitchell Brothers wooden lacrosse goalie stick.

There are three types of lacrosse sticks in use right now by the modern box lacrosse goaltender. Traditional wooden sticks that are made from the bending of long strips of wood and pockets woven with leather and string. This variation goes back to the roots of the game and is still popular with goaltenders at the amateur levels (senior, junior, and minor) but is cost-inhibitive with new sticks ranging in price from $250–400 CAD. Another long-used goal stick type is the NCAA-head stick. Much smaller and covers less space between the legs, the NCAA-head is much easier for ball control. The newest make of goal stick is the "carbon triangle". Similar materials to the NCAA-style stick, the carbon triangle is sized to mimic the coverage of a wooden stick but the lightness of the NCAA-style. This style is becoming very popular in the minor and junior levels, but is banned in the National Lacrosse League. NLL goaltenders generally use NCAA-head sticks.

Although many goalies traditionally wear hockey gloves to protect their hands from high-velocity shots, many goalies have switched to a specialized gloves made specifically for box lacrosse. On the goalies free hand, there is potential for damage to the back of the hand, knuckles, and wrist from a hard shot. Lacrosse goalie gloves have an extra layer of padding on the outside of the glove to deflect damaging shots. This extra padding is on both gloves and serves to also protect the inner wrist of the stick-hand, which is often exposed in the crouch position when wearing hockey gloves as a lacrosse goalie. At the same time, lacrosse goalie gloves are required to give the goalie wrist mobility for when he must handle the ball.

=== Helmets ===
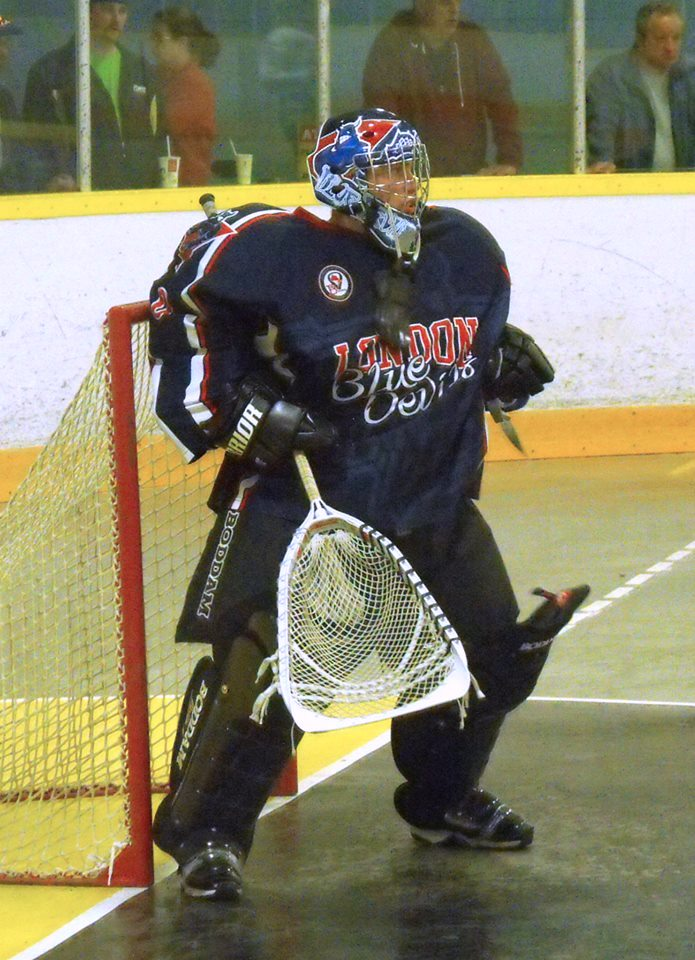
London Blue Devils Jr. B goalie wearing hockey-style helmet (2014).

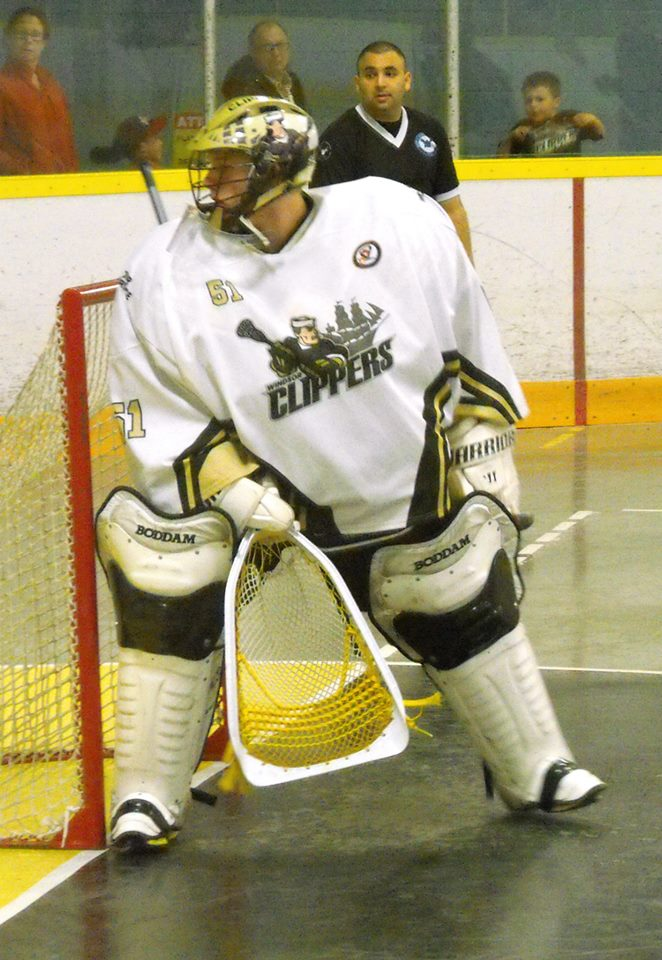
Windsor Clippers Jr. B goalie wearing field-style helmet (2014).

Box goalies wear two different types of helmets. One type is the standard field lacrosse helmet, the other is the ice hockey mask. Field masks have strongly reinforced face masks, thick like the bars on a football helmet and also offer a wider range of vision than a hockey mask. Field helmets do little to protect the throat region. Hockey mask padding can be formed to the users head for comfort. Are very easy to remove quickly and are molded especially for shock absorption. Also, despite cutting down the range of vision of the user, actively protects the throat area from straight on shots. In recent years, baseball catcher-style masks have been offered as a medium between the two helmet types.

At the minor level, most goalies have to wear throat guards or "cow catchers" that attach to the helmet to provide additional coverage for the throat and neck area.

=== Leg guards ===
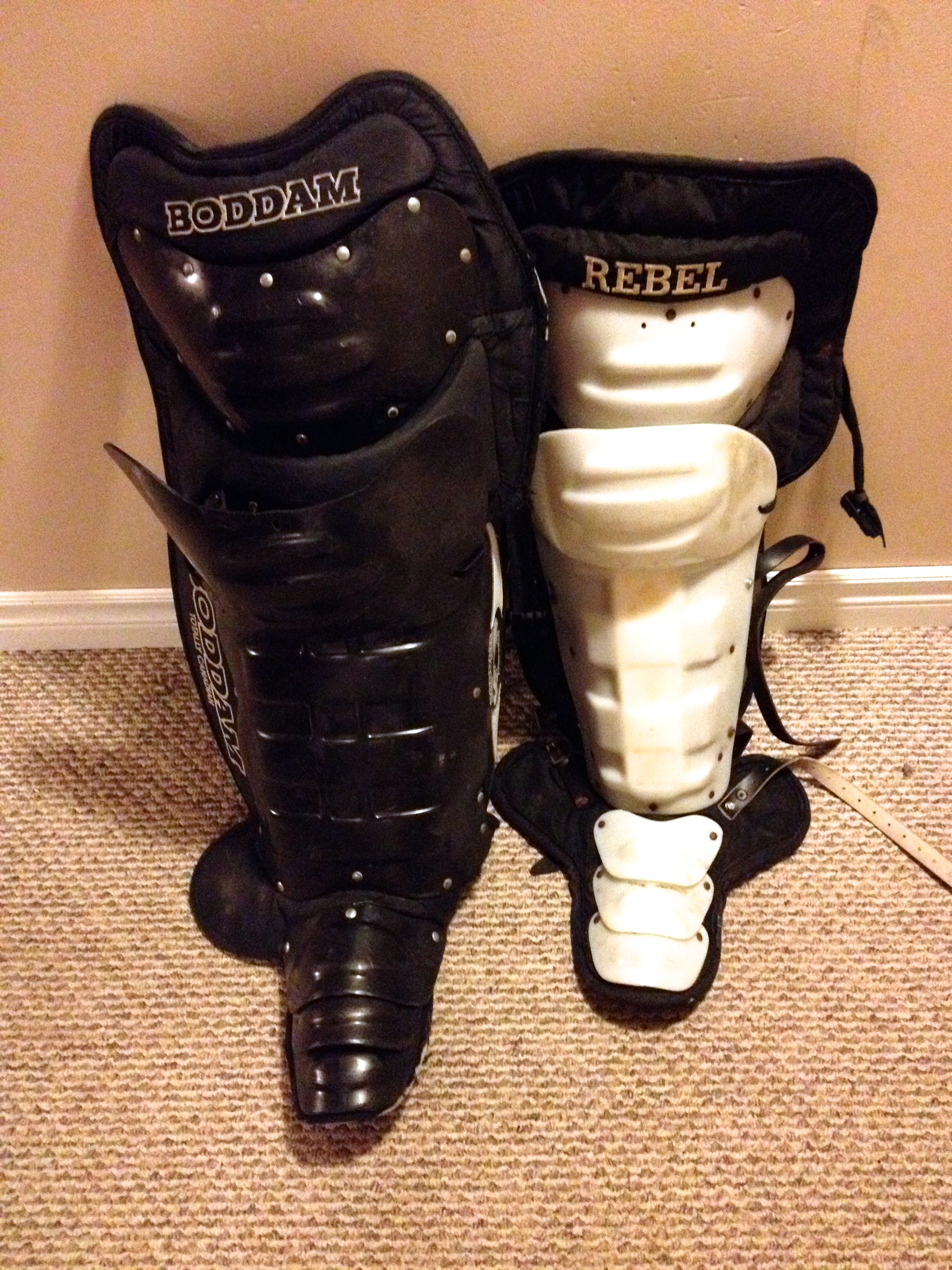
Examples of leg irons. Left is common to the 2000s and 2010s, right is common to the 1990s.

Lacrosse leg guards or "irons" have taken a massive evolution since the early days of the sport. Early goaltenders wore cricket pads made from thin but rigid padding and a thick cloth material. Eventually these evolved into a cross between cricket and baseball catcher's leg guard. Like cricket, the irons covered high above the knee, while having an exoskeleton of molded plastic caps and shin plates to deflect shots and leave less or no bruising like in baseball. In the 2000s and 2010s, the size rules for these pads were very much tested as a market emerged for new lacrosse goalie equipment. Irons grew in width until it was arguable that they were no longer designed to protect the shin, but largely to cover more net. Eventually there was a push back, the Canadian Lacrosse Association and its partners set limitations on shin guard wideness.

=== Uppers and pants ===
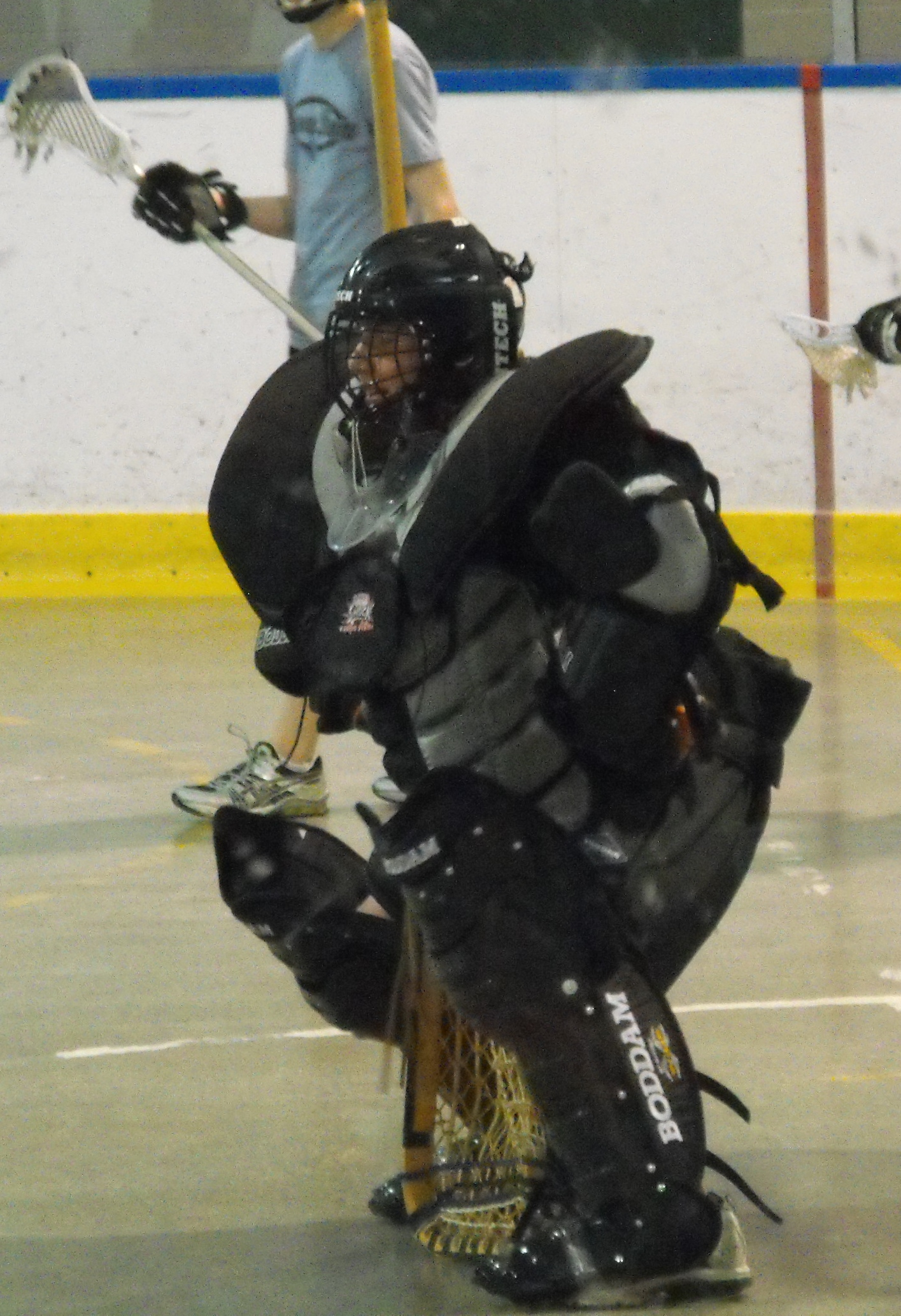
Goaltender practicing, showing off modern box uppers.

Up until about 2005, the distribution and price of lacrosse style upper pads were extremely inhibitive. Until then, goaltenders generally engaged in "building up". Building up was a common practice, a goalie would buy a set of hockey uppers and add to them. Hockey uppers generally do not have enough padding to protect from downward shots or from up-bounces from bounce shots, so materials and other pieces of equipment were often added to protect from these, including: Football lineman shoulder pads, hockey shoulder pads, kidney guards, baseball belly guards, sectioned PVC piping (also used in old lacrosse slash guards), and thick cuts of foam. These augmentations were added not only to increase the upper body size of the goalie, but to increase their safety, comfort, but had to still maintain mobility.

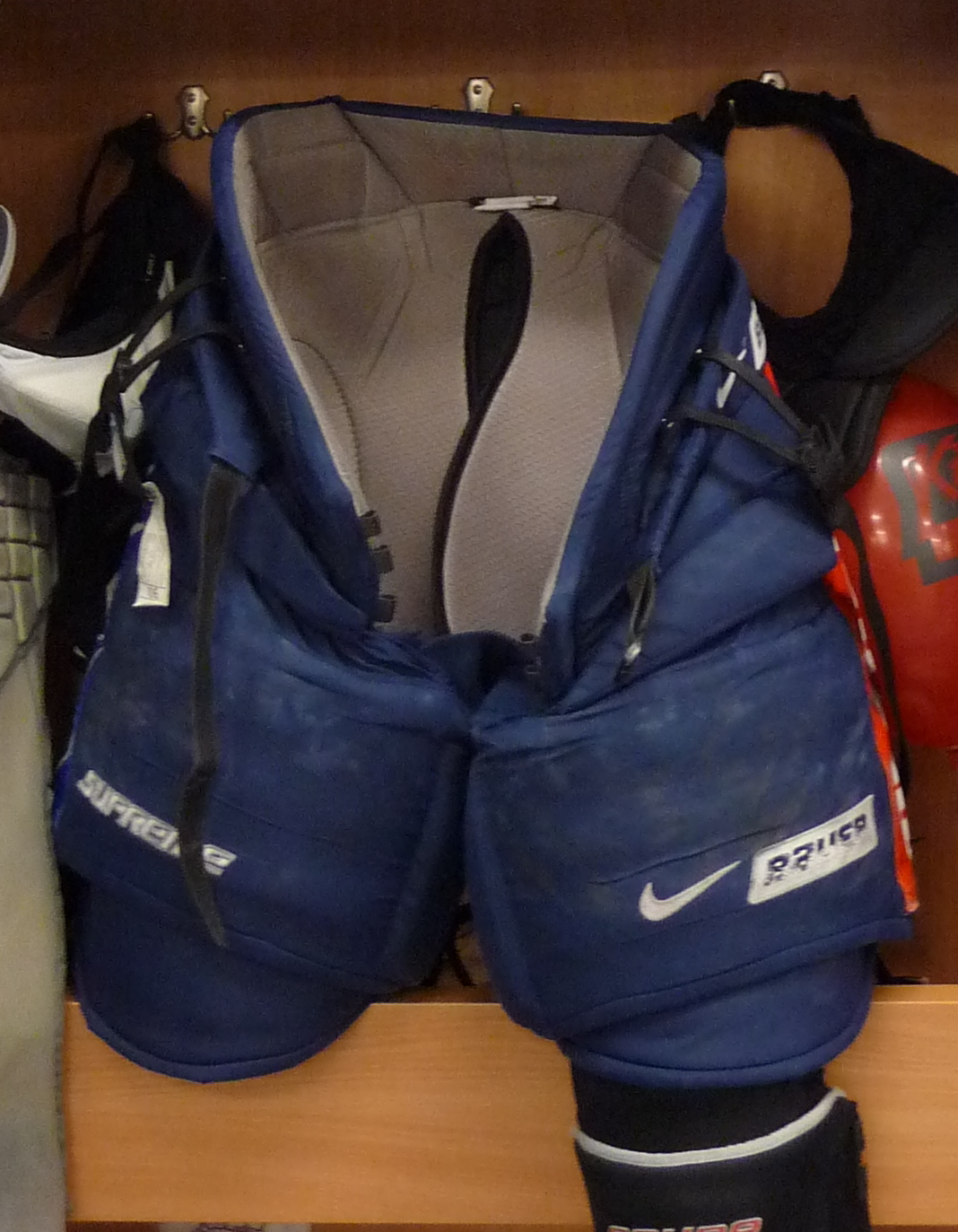
Ice hockey goalie pants, commonly used in box lacrosse.

Since about 2005, the Canadian Lacrosse Association has mandated one-piece unmodified chest protectors for all of its goalies. Because of the price, the team or the minor lacrosse organization often flips the bill for this costly piece of equipment. A legal upper should only stand out from the shoulders at any point by three inches and four inches on the arms.

For pants, the box goalie generally wears hockey goalie pants or a specially modified version of hockey pants with airflow in mind.

=== Other gear ===
- Goaltender jock: Due to the danger of bounce shots, lacrosse goaltenders generally wear an ice hockey goaltender's jock and cup for protection. Goaltender jocks offer more padding to the lower abdomen and genitals, while offering enough undercarriage protection to ward off most dangerous bounce shots.
- Shoes: Most goalies wear typical running shoes. Goaltenders need the mobility to run and the grip to anchor themselves to the floor while in their stance, which can be provided by a good pair of shoes. Toe protection is generally not needed as the leg irons provide very long and wide foot guards.
- Undergarments: Just like in ice hockey, wearing undergarments under the playing gear cuts back on the chances of skin infections in cuts and scratches. It also provides a layer to protect the skin from damage when a hard shot finds a "bare spot" of skin. Traditionally, goalies have worn shorts and tee-shirts or long underwear, but in recent years sweat-weeping clothing has been designed to better suit the needs of athletes.

== Rules ==
The box lacrosse goaltender is allowed to play in any area of the playing surface and is not confined to any zone. Despite this, the box goaltender has a crease, around the entire net, all to himself. Defensive players can enter this area to pick up a loose ball but cannot enter it while in possession of the ball. Offensive players cannot enter the crease. At minor levels and some junior leagues this includes the crease's vertical plane, but at the Junior A, Major, and professional levels it is not uncommon for the player to be allowed to enter the vertical plane while shooting or retrieving a rebound as long as his feet or body do not touch the crease paint on the floor. Such a play is called a "crease dive".

Occasionally, a box lacrosse goaltender will run up and join the play in the offensive zone on a slow whistle or delayed penalty, but the goaltender is usually pulled and substituted with a field player. Goaltenders in box lacrosse are known to sometimes score goals for their team, in power play or slow whistle situations. Also, due to the unique lack of offside rules in box lacrosse, it is not unheard of to see a goaltender lead his team in scoring on game sheets through multiple assists, usually through long passes to teammates that are attempting to breakaway on unsuspecting defenders. Box lacrosse goaltenders are also encouraged to be aggressive stick checkers around the ball and ferocious cross-checkers when needed (cross-checking is legal in box lacrosse). If a goaltender leaves the crease with possession of the ball, opponents are allowed to cross-check the goaltender as long as there is no attempt to injure.

Box lacrosse goalies play in front of a four by four foot net at most levels, unlike a field goalie who plays in front of a six by six net. At the National Lacrosse League, Major, and Junior A levels a net four feet tall and four foot nine inches wide is used.

== Styles ==
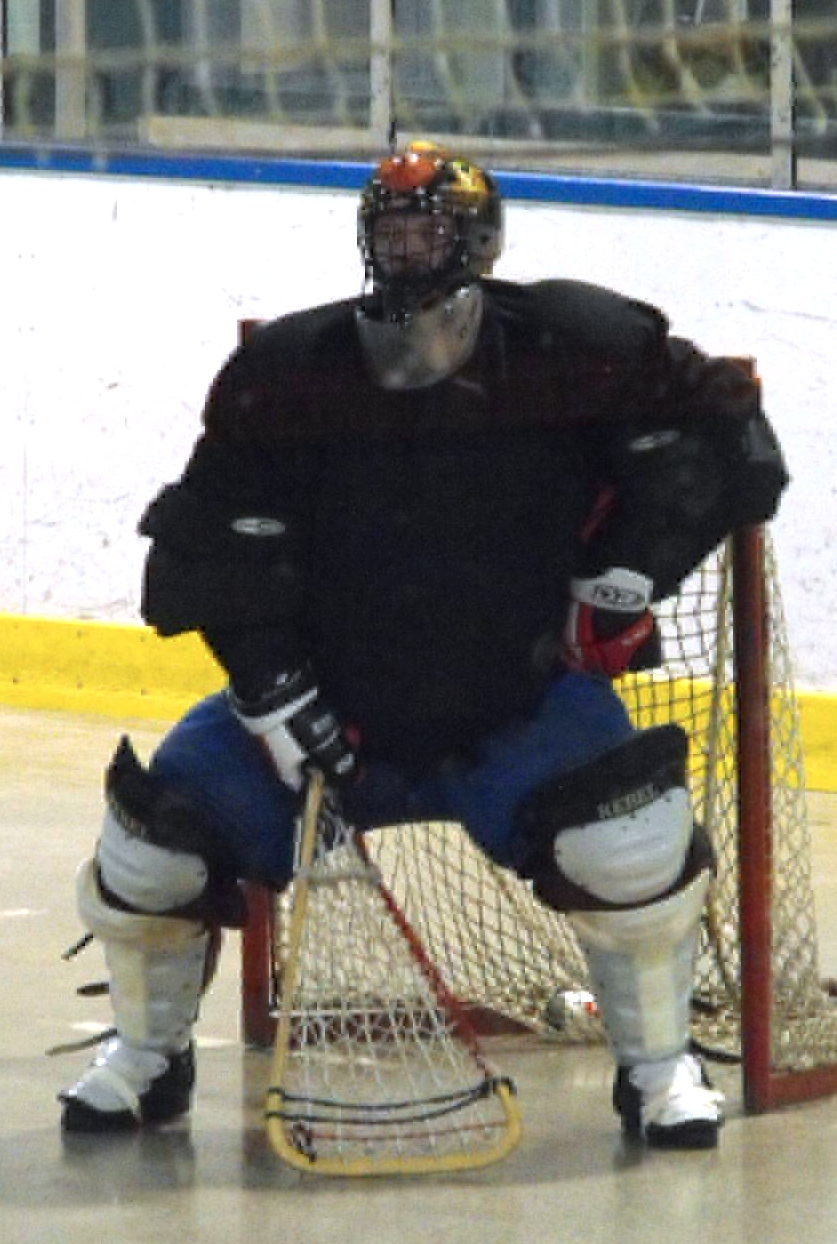
Box goalie challenging shooter on angle in basic stance. Gear typical of the early 2000s.

Goaltending in box lacrosse tends to be more like goaltending in ice hockey than field lacrosse. The box goalie's stance is similar to an ice hockey goalie. The goalie crouched, but with his knees spread, not pinched like in ice hockey. Heels shoulder-width apart, toes generally pointed on an outward angle to allow for stepping into the shot. One hand sits on top of the thigh, holding the goal stick in a position to cover the five-hole (the area between the legs) and the other hand is resting or propped out in the vicinity between the waistline and the outside of the upper thigh. The elbow is propped out, ready to swing out towards a high shot.

The two main styles of box lacrosse goaltending are "playing the stick" and "take away". The playing the stick or positional style is all about staying on angle with the shooter's stick, challenging the shooter by stepping towards him to limit the amount of net he can see, and using your size to your advantage in blocking the shot. Take away or give-and-take is where the goalie stays on the inside of the post on the same side of the shot of the shooter, giving him the opposite side intentionally. This gives the shooter a bad angle shot that the goalie is trying to force him to take. When the player shoots, the goalie quickly steps across and covers the other side of the net and blocks the shot. This style can be highly effective but can fall victim to fake shots.

== Notable players ==
=== National Lacrosse League (1987–Present) ===
Top goaltenders from modern NLL.

- Rob Blasdell
- Aaron Bold
- Anthony Cosmo
- Steve Dietrich
- Matt Disher
- Dallas Eliuk
- Bill Gerrie
- Dwight Maetche
- Brandon Miller
- Ken Montour
- Gord Nash
- Marty O'Neill
- Pat O'Toole
- Curtis Palidwor
- Mike Poulin
- Larry Quinn
- Tyler Richards
- Matt Roik
- Buzz Sheain
- Matt Vinc
- Bob Watson

=== Major Series Lacrosse (1932–1987) ===
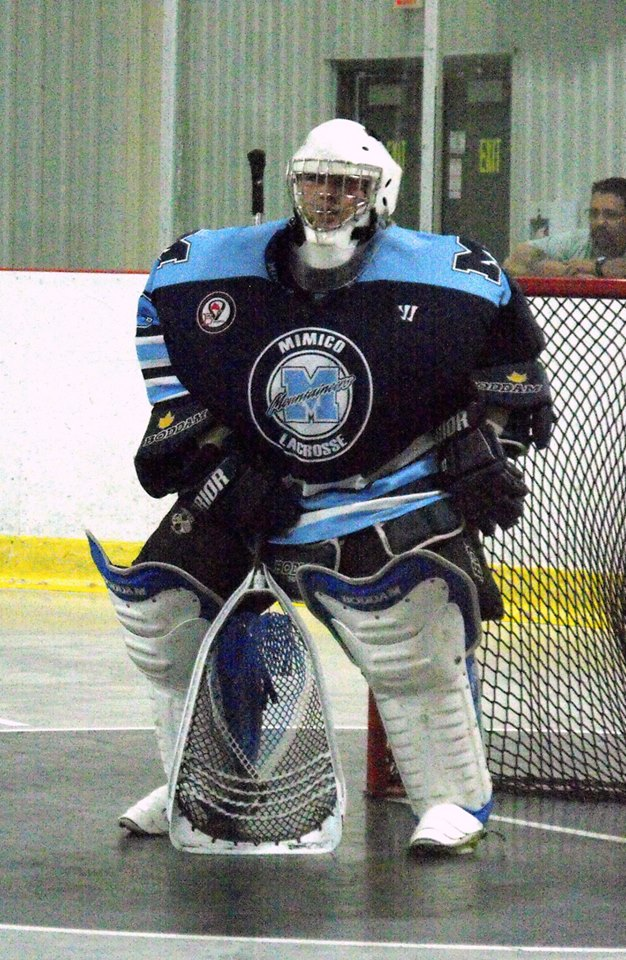
Mimico Mountaineers goaltender during 2014 season.

Top OLA and NLL (1974–75) goaltenders before modern NLL was founded. These goaltenders listed have either won top honours in their top tier league or have led their team to the Mann Cup finals.

- Pete Anthony
- Pat Baker
- Tim Barrie
- Grant Bryck
- Wayne Colley
- Doug Favell
- Ted Gernaey
- Ted Hall
- Frip Harrison
- Bill MacArthur
- Merv Marshall
- Barry Maruk
- Bob McCready
- Ernie Mitchell
- Bill Moreau
- Ray Mortimer
- Wayne Platt
- Gary Powless
- Bob Rohmer
- Dave Russell
- Bob Savage
- Ron "Hum" Thomas
- Jim Thompson
- Joe Tomchishyn
- Shawn Quinlan
- Bill Whittaker
- Harry Woods
- Lloyd "Moon" Wootton

=== Western Lacrosse Association (1933–1987) ===
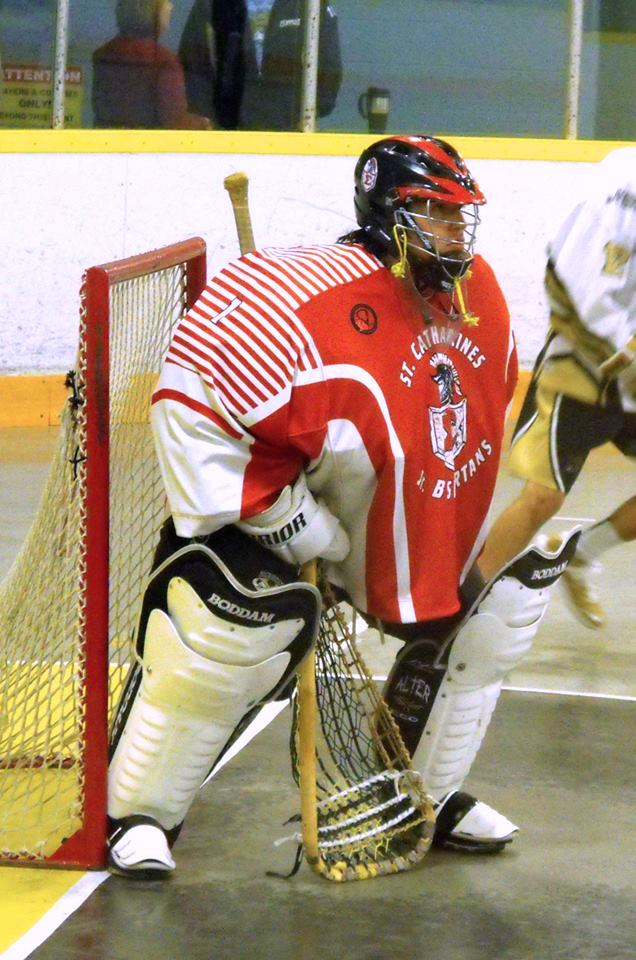
St. Catharines Spartans goalie during 2014 season.

Top west coast goaltenders before the modern NLL was founded. These goaltenders listed have either won top honours in their top tier league or have led their team to the Mann Cup finals.

- Bill Andrews
- Pete Anthony
- Henry Baker
- Rod Banister
- Skip Chapman
- Joe Comeau
- Herb Delmonico
- Dave Evans
- Barry Forbes
- Fred Fulla
- Jack Green
- Don Hamilton
- Geordie Johnston
- Ed Johnstone
- Stan Joseph
- Walt Lee
- Gary McLaughlin
- Norm Nestman
- Les Norman
- Gordie Pogue
- Harry Preston
- Shawn Quinlan
- Merv Schweitzer
- Bill Scuby
- Alf Shuker
- Larry Smeltzer
- Hap Smith
- Bill Thomas
- Greg Thomas
- Doug Zack
