= Stanley Albert Joseph =

Canadian lacrosse player (1928–2001)

Stan "Bunny" Joseph
Personal information
- Nationality: Canadian
- Born: April 28, 1928 Vancouver, British Columbia, Canada
- Died: March 21, 2001 (aged 72) North Vancouver, British Columbia, Canada

Sport
- Position: Goaltender
- ICLL team: North Shore Indians; New Westminster Salmonbellies; Vancouver Carlings; Coquitlam Adanacs
- Pro career: 1945–1970

Career highlights
- Mann Cup: 1958, 1959, 1961; Maitland Trophy: 1952; McDonald Trophy: 1961; Nicholson Trophy: 1950, 1952, 1956, 1960

Stanley "Bunny" Albert Joseph (April 28, 1928 – March 21, 2001) was a Canadian amateur box lacrosse goaltender. A member of the Canadian Lacrosse Hall of Fame, Bunny was the winner of three Mann Cup national championships over the span of a 25-year career. He is known for his unorthodox goaltending style and longevity as an elite goaltender in the sport. At the time of his death he was a highly respected elder of the Squamish Nation in North Vancouver.

== Career ==
Joseph started his Senior A career as a teenager. Like his father, veteran of 3 Mann Cup finals Stan Joseph, Bunny started his career with the North Shore Indians. As a goalie, he stood out - not just because of his great play, but because of his unorthodox style. Bunny played with both hands on his stick and the head of his stick to his side at waist level, a style unique even to this day.

In 1955, the Indians folded and Bunny played the 1956 season with Vancouver, before shipping over to the powerhouse New Westminster Salmonbellies. In 1958, he helped lead the Salmonbellies to a Mann Cup victory over the Long Branch Pontiacs. A season later, he would win another Mann Cup against the Peterborough Timbermen, but see severely diminished playing time due to the rise of rookie phenom Les Norman. In the winter he asked for a tryout with the Vancouver Carlings. With something to prove and a new club, Bunny finished off his second season with the Carlings with his third Mann Cup victory. Bunny played two more seasons of Senior A, then took a player-coach position with the Senior B North Shore Indians.

Bunny Joseph would return to the Senior A ranks from 1968 until 1970 with North Vancouver and the Coquitlam Adanacs. He played his final game of Senior A with the Adanacs on July 11, 1970, before calling it a career. He would return to the Indians Sr. B team to dabble for a couple more seasons, but after 25 years he was done with Sr. A lacrosse.

Bunny was inducted into the Canadian Lacrosse Hall of Fame in 1976. To this day, Bunny Joseph has played the fourth most games (522) of any Western Lacrosse Association player and has faced and stopped more shots than any other WLA goaltender in regular season (10,747 of 15,302) and season and playoff combined (13,040 of 18,456), all while maintaining a 0.707 save percentage.

== Statistics ==
Source: Wamper's Bible of Lacrosse and Stan Shillington's "Who's Who in Lacrosse 1933-2013: Goaltending Records".

Season	Team	League	GP	G	A	P	PIM	Sv%	Team GAA
1945	North Shore	ICLL	20	0	0	0	0	0.607	17.29
1946	North Shore	ICLL	24	0	1	1	0	0.602	17.04
1947	North Shore	ICLL	24	0	0	0	0	0.640	14.38
1948	North Shore	ICLL	23	0	0	0	0	0.689	13.88
-	North Shore	P/O	3	0	0	0	0	0.730	-
1949	North Shore	ICLL	16	0	1	1	0	0.692	11.56
-	North Shore	P/O	3	0	0	0	0	0.723	-
1950	North Shore	ICLL	29	0	0	0	0	0.708	11.23
-	North Shore	P/O	5	0	0	0	0	0.728	-
1951	North Shore	ICLL	25	0	0	0	0	0.709	11.09
-	North Shore	P/O	3	0	0	0	0	0.594	-
1952	North Shore	ICLL	28	0	0	0	0	0.699	11.35
-	North Shore	P/O	10	0	0	0	0	0.735	-
1953	North Shore	ICLL	30	0	0	0	0	0.751	9.91
-	North Shore	P/O	4	0	0	0	0	0.676	-
1954	North Shore	ICLL	28	0	1	1	0	0.720	8.88
-	North Shore	P/O	10	0	1	1	0	0.755	-
1955	North Shore	ICLL	27	0	1	1	0	0.706	10.28
-	North Shore	P/O	4	0	0	0	0	0.701	-
1956	Vancouver	ICLL	18	0	1	1	0	0.747	10.67
-	Vancouver	P/O	7	0	0	0	0	0.688	-
1957	New Westminster	ICLL	30	0	0	0	0	0.720	9.40
-	New Westminster	P/O	4	0	1	1	0	0.709	-
1958	New Westminster	ICLL	26	0	0	0	0	0.723	10.00
-	New Westminster	P/O	11	0	0	0	0	0.730	-
1959	New Westminster	ICLL	14	0	0	0	0	0.712	10.20
-	New Westminster	P/O	1	0	0	0	0	0.733	-
1960	Vancouver	ICLL	23	0	1	1	0	0.753	8.27
-	Vancouver	P/O	6	0	0	0	0	0.896	-
1961	Vancouver	ICLL	5	0	0	0	0	0.734	8.53
-	Vancouver	P/O	12	0	0	0	2	0.786	-
1962	Vancouver	ICLL	12	0	0	0	0	0.772	6.63
-	Vancouver	P/O	4	0	0	0	0	0.789	-
1963	New Westminster	ICLL	3	0	0	0	0	0.800	8.77
-	New Westminster	P/O	9	0	0	0	0	0.733	-
1964-67	Played Sr. B with North Shore								
1968	North Vancouver	ICLL	9	0	1	1	0	0.727	14.36
1969	North Vancouver	ICLL	11	0	3	3	2	0.790	12.17
1970	Coquitlam	WLA	1	0	0	0	0	0.704	12.13
