= Lloyd Wootton =

Canadian lacrosse player

Lloyd "Moon" Wootton
Personal information
- Nationality: Canadian
- Born: 1927 Owen Sound, Ontario
- Died: 1989 (aged 61–62) Port Hope, Ontario

Sport
- Position: Goaltender
- OSALL team: Owen Sound Crescents; Peterborough Trailermen
- Pro career: 1946–1959

Career highlights
- Mann Cup: 1950, 1951, 1952, 1953, 1954; Mann Cup MVP: 1950, 1951, 1954; OLA Champions: 1950, 1951, 1952, 1953, 1954, 1955, 1956, 1957, 1959; Jim Murphy Trophy: 1951, 1955; Harry Lumley Award: 1955, 1956, 1957, 1959

William Lloyd "Moon" Wootton (born 1927 in Owen Sound, Ontario; d. 1989 in Port Hope, Ontario) was a Canadian professional box lacrosse goaltender. At the height of his career, Moon was considered by some to be the best lacrosse goaltender in Canada and by some to be the greatest lacrosse goaltender in history. He holds the distinction of winning five straight Mann Cup national championships, three Mann Cup most valuable player honours, and nine Ontario Senior A Championships in nine season of participation. He was entered into the Canadian Lacrosse Hall of Fame in its first year of existence.

== Career ==
When the Owen Sound Georgians joined the Ontario Senior A Lacrosse League in 1946, they brought with them a young and unknown teenage goaltender named Lloyd Wootton. By 1950, the Georgians had become the Crescents and "Moon" was coming into his own as one of the league's elite goaltenders. He led the league in goals against, his team to first place in the OLA, and was named a first team all-star. The Crescents would defeat the Peterborough Timbermen in five games and the St. Catharines Athletics in seven to take the Ontario championship. In the Mann Cup, Wootton would lead the Crescents to their first and only national championship, taking the Cup in seven games over the New Westminster Adanacs. For his play, Wootton was awarded most valuable player of the Mann Cup for the first of three times.

As many of the veterans left the Crescents in the winter after they won the Mann Cup, Wootton, Jack "Curly" Mason, and Russ Slater were transferred to the Peterborough Trailermen. In 1951, their addition meant instant success and they would become the first players to win five consecutive Mann Cups (a distinction not seen again until 1996). Moon led the Trailermen to first in the league with the second lowest goals against average and gained league most valuable player and first team all-star honours. The Trailermen would take the OLA Championship by defeating the Fergus Thistles and Mimico Mountaineers in the final. In the Mann Cup final, the Trailermen would defeat the Vancouver Combines in seven games and Moon would win his second Mann Cup most valuable player trophy.

In 1952, Wootton would help his team to the best record in the OLA again while letting in 32 less goals than the next best defensive team. Moon was again a first team all-star. They would win the OLA title again and sweep the Vancouver Burrards in four games to win him his third straight Mann Cup.

The 1953 season saw the Trailermen edge out St. Catharines by one win to take the regular season pennant. Despite the Athletics outscoring the Trailermen by 33 goals, Wootton's tending kept 31 less goals out of Peterborough nets than their foe. The Trailermen would sweep aside the Orillia Terriers and make quick work of the Athletics (five games) to win a third straight title. At the Mann Cup, the Trailermen would defeat the Victoria Shamrocks 4-games-to-1 to take a third straight Mann Cup (fourth for Wootton).

The Trailermen would dominate the 1954 regular season and the playoffs to easily win a fourth straight league title. They would again defeat Victoria in five games to win a fourth straight Mann Cup, five straight for Wootton, Mason, and Slater. Wootton would win his third Mann Cup most valuable player trophy in five years.

In 1955, Wootton would help win another regular season crown and his sixth straight OLA championship. He would be named the OLA's top player, first team all-star, and win the first ever Harry Lumley Award for best goals against, but would lose the Mann Cup and end his five-year streak in five games to the Victoria Shamrocks.

The Trailermen would dominate again in 1956, Moon leading them to the top record, a second straight Harry Lumley Trophy, and his seventh straight OLA championship. Despite this, the Trailermen would lose the Mann Cup again, this time in five games to the Nanaimo Timbermen.

In 1957, the Trailermen again dominated the OLA and earned entry into the Mann Cup. Wootton would win his third straight Harry Lumley Award and eighth straight OLA title. League leading scorer Bob Allan (thought to be the top player of the era) transferred without release from the Western Lacrosse Association to Peteroborough. The OLA allowed him to play the entire season, but the Canadian Lacrosse Association barred him from playing for the Mann Cup. Peterborough refused to take the floor without him, so the CLA replaced them with the runner-up and rusty Long Branch Pontiacs and banned the entire Trailermen team (including Wootton) from play for five years. The ban was shortened to one season and Moon and his team were able to return for 1959.

The 1959 season saw elder statesman Wootton return for one more season and share the twine with future star Pat Baker for the season. They would win Wootton a fourth Harry Lumley Award and a ninth OLA championship but again fall in the Mann Cup final in four games to the New Westminster O'Keefes. With that, Moon called it a career and moved to Port Hope.

During his career, Moon helped record the lowest team goals against average seven times during his career (1950, 1952, 1953, 1955, 1956, 1957, and 1959), winning the Harry Lumley Award for lowest GAA four times (first awarded in 1955).

Moon was inducted into the Canadian Lacrosse Hall of Fame on the very first ballad in 1965. He was also entered into the Peterborough and District Sports Hall of Fame in 1990.

== Family ==
He had seven children with his wife, Florence Wilhelm Wootton, who resided in Port Hope, Ontario until she died in February 2016. His eldest daughter, Donna Wootton, is a Canadian novelist who also wrote a biography on her father's life.

== Statistics ==
Source: Wamper's Bible of Lacrosse

Season	Team	League	GP	G	A	P	PIM	Team GAA
1946	Owen Sound	OJALL	4	0	0	0	0	-
-	Owen Sound	OSALL	29	0	0	0	0	14.67
-	Owen Sound	P/O	3	0	0	0	0	18.00
1947	Owen Sound	OSALL	27	0	3	3	2	12.93
-	Owen Sound	P/O	7	0	0	0	0	9.86
1948	Owen Sound	OSALL	30	1	1	2	5	9.23
-	Owen Sound	P/O	5	0	0	0	0	13.40
1949	Owen Sound	OSALL	35	0	1	1	0	10.11
-	Owen Sound	P/O	10	0	0	0	0	8.70
1950	Owen Sound	OSALL	30	0	6	6	0	7.82
-	Owen Sound	P/O	12	0	1	1	0	7.08
-	Owen Sound	Mann	6	0	0	0	0	-
1951	Peterborough	OSALL	30	0	2	2	0	8.73
-	Peterborough	P/O	9	0	0	0	0	6.33
-	Peterborough	Mann	2	0	0	0	0	-
1952	Peterborough	OSALL	29	0	0	0	0	8.33
-	Peterborough	P/O	11	0	1	1	0	9.36
-	Peterborough	Mann	4	0	0	0	0	-
1953	Peterborough	OSALL	25	0	6	6	0	8.30
-	Peterborough	P/O	9	0	3	3	0	7.11
-	Peterborough	Mann	5	0	1	1	0	-
1954	Peterborough	OSALL	29	1	3	4	4	7.17
-	Peterborough	P/O	10	0	0	0	2	6.80
-	Peterborough	Mann	5	0	0	0	0	-
1955	Peterborough	OSALL	22	0	2	2	0	9.21
-	Peterborough	P/O	8	0	0	0	0	6.50
-	Peterborough	Mann	5	0	0	0	0	-
1956	Peterborough	OSALL	22	0	3	3	4	7.84
-	Peterborough	P/O	12	0	1	1	0	9.00
-	Peterborough	Mann	5	0	1	1	0	-
1957	Peterborough	OSALL	18	0	3	3	6	9.44
-	Peterborough	P/O	10	0	0	0	0	9.70
1958	Peterborough	Suspended by CLA						
1959	Peterborough	OSALL	15	0	4	4	4	8.52
-	Peterborough	P/O	9	0	0	0	0	5.67
-	Peterborough	Mann	4	0	0	0	0	-
