= Mike Kelley Memorial Trophy =

- MVP award of the Mann Cup
- Country: Canada
- First award: 1941; 85 years ago
- Current holder: (Canada) Ryan Smith (2025; 1st award)

Highlights
- Most awards: (Canada) Lloyd Wootton (Canada) John Tavares (Canada) Paul Gait (Canada) Anthony Cosmo (Canada) Shawn Evans (3 awards each)
- Team with most awards: Peterborough Lakers (17)

The Mike Kelley Memorial Trophy is awarded annually to the Most Valuable Player of the Mann Cup competition.

The trophy is named after Michael Edward Francis "Mike" Kelley who was the owner and manager of the Hamilton Tigers lacrosse club in the early 1930s - and later the president of the Ontario Lacrosse Association and Canadian Lacrosse Association.

For some unknown reason, Kelley's name was misspelled and perpetuated as "Kelly" until the Canadian Lacrosse Hall of Fame was notified in 2014 of the error by the grandson of Mike Kelley. The Canadian Lacrosse Association and Canadian Lacrosse Foundation were notified during the 2015 Mann Cup series and corrections to the spelling would be made moving forward.

The Mann Cup is the senior men's lacrosse championship of Canada. The championship series is played between the Western Lacrosse Association champion and the Major Series Lacrosse champion.

Year	Player	Team	No.
1941	Blackie Black	Richmond Farmers	1
1942	Bert Large	Mimico-Brampton Combines	1
1943	Bill Wilkes	New Westminster Salmonbellies	1
1944	Ike Hildebrand	New Westminster Salmonbellies	1
1945	Frank Lee	Vancouver Burrards	1
1946	Doug Favell Sr.	St. Catharines Athletics	1
1947	Bob Lee	New Westminster Adanacs	1
1948	Doug Favell Sr.	Hamilton Tigers	2
1949	Don Matheson	Vancouver Burrards	1
1950	Lloyd "Moon" Wootton	Owen Sound Crescents	1
1951	Lloyd "Moon" Wootton	Peterborough Timbermen	2
1952	Lou Nickle	Peterborough Timbermen	1
1953	Ross Powless	Peterborough Trailermen	1
1954	Lloyd "Moon" Wootton	Peterborough Trailermen	3
1955	Geordie Johnson	Victoria Shamrocks	1
1956	Derry Davies	Nanaimo Timbermen	1
1957	Jack Northup	Victoria Shamrocks	1
1958	Norm Mckay	New Westminster Salmonbellies	1
1959	Jack Bionda	New Westminster O'Keefes	1
1960	Dave "Porky" Russell	Port Credit Sailors	1
1961	Bill Barbour	Vancouver Burrards	1
1962	Jack Bionda	New Westminster O'Keefes	2
1963	Gordie Gimple	Vancouver Carlings	1
1964	Bob Allan	Brooklin Merchants	1
1965	Les Norman	New Westminster Salmonbellies	1
1966	John Davis	Peterborough Lakers	1
1967	John Davis	Brooklin Redmen	2
1967	John Cervi	Vancouver Carlings	1
1968	Joe Tomchishen	Brooklin Redmen	1
1969	Bill Squire	Brooklin Redmen	1
1970	Paul Parnell	New Westminster Salmonbellies	1
1971	Bob McCready	Brantford Warriors	1
1972	Paul Parnell	New Westminster Salmonbellies	2
1973	Pat Baker	Peterborough Lakers	1
1974	Ken Winzoski	New Westminster Salmonbellies	1
1975	Ron Pinder	Vancouver Burrards	1
1976	Dave Durante	New Westminster Salmonbellies	1
1977	Doug Hayes	Vancouver Burrards	1
1977	Mike Smith	Vancouver Burrards	1
1978	Tim Barrie	Peterborough Red Oaks	1
1979	Ivan Thompson	Victoria Shamrocks	1
1980	Barry Maruk	Brampton Excelsiors	1
1981	Wayne Goss	New Westminster Salmonbellies	1
1982	Jim Wasson	Peterborough Lakers	1
1983	John Crowther	Victoria Pay Less	1
1984	John Grant Sr.	Peterborough Lakers	1
1985	Wayne Colley	Brooklin Redmen	1
1986	Geordie Dean	New Westminster Salmonbellies	1
1987	Jim Meredith	Brooklin Redmen	1
1987	Eric Cowieson	New Westminster Salmonbellies	1
1988	Bill Thomas	Coquitlam Adanacs	1
1989	Ben Hieltjes	New Westminster Salmonbellies	1
1990	Paul Gait	Brooklin Redmen	1
1991	Geordie Dean	New Westminster Salmonbellies	2
1992	John Tavares	Brampton Excelsiors	1
1993	John Tavares	Brampton Excelsiors	2
1994	Darris Kilgour	Six Nations Chiefs	1
1995	Paul Gait	Six Nations Chiefs	2
1996	John Tavares	Six Nations Chiefs	3
1997	Gary Gait	Victoria Shamrocks	1
1998	Pat O'Toole	Brampton Excelsiors	1
1999	Gary Gait	Victoria Shamrocks	2
1999	Paul Gait	Victoria Shamrocks	3
2000	Nick Trudeau	Brooklin Redmen	1
2001	Andy Ogilvie	Coquitlam Adanacs	1
2002	Josh Sanderson	Brampton Excelsiors	1
2003	Andrew Turner	Victoria Shamrocks	1
2004	John Grant Jr.	Peterborough Lakers	1
2005	Anthony Cosmo	Victoria Shamrocks	1
2006	Dan Carey	Peterborough Lakers	1
2007	John Grant Jr.	Peterborough Lakers	2
2008	Anthony Cosmo	Brampton Excelsiors	2
2009	Shawn Williams	Brampton Excelsiors	1
2010	Shawn Evans	Peterborough Lakers	1
2011	Anthony Cosmo	Brampton Excelsiors	3
2012	Mike Thompson	Peterborough Lakers	1
2013	Cody Jamieson	Six Nations Chiefs	1
2014	Brandon Miller	Six Nations Chiefs	1
2015	Corey Small	Victoria Shamrocks	1
2016	Dan Dawson	Six Nation Chiefs	1
2017	Shawn Evans	Peterborough Lakers	2
2018	Shawn Evans	Peterborough Lakers	3
2019	Mike Poulin	Peterborough Lakers	1
2020	Not awarded due to COVID-19 pandemic
2021	Not awarded due to COVID-19 pandemic
2022	Curtis Dickson	Langley Thunder	1
2023	Cody Jamieson	Six Nations Chiefs	2
2024	Lyle Thompson	Six Nations Chiefs	1
2025	Ryan Smith	Six Nations Chiefs	1

== See also ==
- Lt. Raymond Enners Award, MVP award of the NCAA men's college lacrosse
- National Lacrosse League MVP Award
