= Bob McCready =

Canadian lacrosse player

Bob "Buff" McCready
Personal information
- Nationality: Canadian
- Born: 1940 Port Dalhousie, Ontario
- Died: June 2007 (aged 66–67) Brantford, Ontario

Sport
- Position: Goaltender
- OSALL/ NLA/ NLL team: Brampton Excelsiors (OSALL); Maryland Arrows (NLL); Toronto Tomahawks (NLL); Brantford Warriors (OSALL); St. Catharines Golden Hawks (NLA); Montreal Canadians (NLA); Brooklin Redmen (OSALL); St. Catharines Athletics (OSALL)
- Pro career: 1961–1976

Career highlights
- Mann Cup: 1971; Mann Cup MVP: 1971; Harry Lumley Award: 1973

Robert "Buff" McCready (1940 – June 2007) was a Canadian professional and amateur box lacrosse goaltender. McCready was also a professional lacrosse coach in the National Lacrosse League. He won the Mann Cup National Canadian Major championship and was named 1971 most valuable player. McCready was considered an elite goaltender in his time and is credited as turning the goaltending position into an offensive threat as well as the last line of defense. He is a member of the Canadian Lacrosse Hall of Fame.

== Career ==
Buff was born in Port Dalhousie, Ontario. In 1960, Buff was transferred from St. Catharines to Whitby in the Ontario Junior A Lacrosse League. That year he led the Red Wings to an OJALL title and to the Minto Cup final where they ultimately lost.

In 1963, McCready partnered with rival all-star goalie Pat Baker to compete for the Mann Cup, but St. Catharines ultimately lost.

McCready won the Mann Cup with Brantford in 1973 and was named the playoff's most valuable player.

In 1968, McCready played professionally with the newly formed Montreal Canadians of the National Lacrosse Association. He was named second team all-star.

In 1969, McCready signed with the NLA's St. Catharines Golden Hawks. He came third in team scoring despite being a goaltender with 3 goals and 81 assists in 35 games.

In 1974, he returned to professional lacrosse as it reemerged as the National Lacrosse League. With the Toronto Tomahawks McCready scored 53 assists in 36 games.

The next season, McCready was transferred to the Maryland Arrows where he scored 24 assists in 17 games. The league folded after the season.

McCready was later inducted both the Canadian Lacrosse Hall of Fame and the Ontario Lacrosse Hall of Fame in 1997.

In 1992, McCready was named the first ever coach of the National Lacrosse League's Buffalo Bandits, albeit for only three games.

Lacrosse star Pat McCready is Bob McCready's son. Before Buff's death, he acted as an assistant coach with the Rochester Knighthawks from 1998 until 2001 and had returned to the Bandits organization for the 2007 season that had just ended. In joining the Bandits, he had the opportunity to join Pat for one more season.

McCready died in 2007 in Brantford, Ontario. In 2009, St. Catharines honoured McCready by adding him to their Sports Wall of Fame.

== Statistics ==
Source: Wamper's Bible of Lacrosse

Season'	Team	League	GP	G	A	P	PIM	Team GAA
1958	St. Catharines	OJALL	-	0	2	2	2	13.24
1959	St. Catharines	OJALL	-	0	12	12	2	6.00
-	St. Catharines	P/O	-	0	7	7	0	7.00
1960	Whitby	OJALL	-	1	21	22	10	8.30
-	Whitby	P/O	-	0	9	9	11	6.77
-	Whitby	Minto	5	0	6	6	4	-
1961	St. Catharines	OSALL	22	0	12	12	20	9.00
-	St. Catharines	P/O	6	0	0	0	5	-
1962	St. Catharines	OSALL	23	1	14	15	42	11.75
-	St. Catharines	P/O	5	0	1	1	0	-
1963	St. Catharines	OSALL	23	0	12	12	13	8.35
-	St. Catharines	P/O	11	0	3	3	2	-
-	St. Catharines	Mann	3	0	1	1	2	-
1964	St. Catharines	OSALL	24	4	10	14	24	9.38
-	St. Catharines	P/O	7	0	1	1	9	-
1965	St. Catharines	OSALL	20	0	21	21	15	10.92
-	St. Catharines	P/O	7	0	9	9	2	-
1966	St. Catharines	OSALL	7	0	4	4	6	
1967	Brooklin	OSALL	22	1	21	22	27	10.42
-	Brooklin	P/O	10	0	8	8	16	-
-	Brooklin	Mann	6	0	3	3	2	-
1968	Montreal	NLA	38	0	51	51	105	13.53
-	Montreal	P/O	7	0	7	7	14	-
1969	St. Catharines	NLA	35	2	81	83	82	14.61
-	St. Catharines	P/O	7	0	13	13	16	13.43
1970	Did Not Participate							
1971	Brantford	OSALL	29	1	52	53	22	11.20
-	Brantford	P/O	10	0	21	21	12	-
-	Brantford	Mann	4	0	10	10	2	-
1972	Brantford	MSL	26	1	53	54	47	13.97
-	Brantford	P/O	11	1	28	29	5	-
-	Brantford	Mann	4	0	12	12	10	-
1973	Brantford	MSL	23	4	73	77	37	12.58
-	Brantford	P/O	10	0	20	20	-	-
1974	Toronto	NLL	36	0	53	53	29	16.98
1975	Maryland	NLL	17	0	24	24	19	16.04
1976	Brampton	MSL	1	0	3	3	4	14.25
