= Joe Comeau =

Joe Comeau or Joseph Comeau may refer to:

- Joe Comeau (lacrosse) (born 1940)
- Joe Comeau (musician), vocalist for the band Liege Lord
- Joseph William Comeau (1876–1966), Canadian educator and political figure

== See also ==
- Joey Comeau, Canadian writer
