= Joe Comeau (lacrosse) =

Canadian lacrosse player (born 1940)

Personal information
- Nationality: Canadian
- Born: June 24, 1940 (age 86) Vancouver, British Columbia, Canada

Sport
- Position: Goaltender
- WLA/ NLA team: New Westminster Salmonbellies (WLA); New Westminster Salmonbellies (NLA); Coquitlam Adanacs (WLA); Portland Adanacs (NLA); Vancouver Carlings (WLA)
- Pro career: 1961–1976

Career highlights
- Minto Cup: 1960; Mann Cup: 1970, 1972, 1974, 1976; Commission Trophy: 1976; Ellison Trophy: 1974; Nicholson Trophy: 1971, 1972, 1974, 1976

Joe "The Quiet Man" Comeau (born June 24, 1940) is a Canadian retired amateur and professional box lacrosse goaltender. A member of the Canadian Lacrosse Hall of Fame, Comeau was the winner of four Mann Cup national championships, WLA playoff and regular season most valuable player trophies, seven all-star team inductions and four Nicholson Trophies as the WLA's top goaltender.

== Career ==
At age 12, Comeau switched from defenceman to goaltender. After four provincial minor championships, he was promoted to the Junior A New Westminster Salmonbellies. He helped lead the 'Bellies to the 1960 Minto Cup with a 21–1 record and an 0.810 save percentage in the regular season.

In 1962, Comeau was forced to split his time between the New Westminster Salmonbellies of the ICLL and Port Coquitlam of the Senior B loop. In Senior B, he led Port Coquitlam to a provincial title. By 1964, he was full-time with the Salmonbellies. He also played a stint with the Coquitlam Adanacs.

In 1968, Comeau turned professional with the relocated Portland Adanacs in the National Lacrosse Association, but rejoined the Salmonbellies for the 1969 NLA season. The 'Bellies would win the WLA Conference of the NLA, but lose the final to the Peterborough Lakers. The NLA folded at the end of the 1969 season.

In 1971, 1972, and 1973, Comeau was a WLA playoff champion and won the Mann Cup in 1971 and 1973. He subsequently retired from lacrosse. In 1974, he returned and won yet another league title and Mann Cup and retired again. Late in the 1976 season, his Salmonbellies were suffering a bad season, and he came out of retirement to turn their season around, win the league and a fourth Mann Cup. He then retired for a third and final time.

"Quiet Man" Comeau was elected into the Canadian Lacrosse Hall of Fame in 1983. The Salmonbellies dynasty that he was an integral part of was also inducted in 2004.

== Statistics ==
Source: Wamper's Bible of Lacrosse and Stan Shillington's "Who's Who in Lacrosse 1933-2013: Goaltending Records".

Season	Team	League	GP	G	A	P	PIM	Sv%	Team GAA
1960	New Westminster	BCJALL	20	0	1	1	6	-	5.36
1961	Vancouver	BCJALL	14	0	0	0	2	-	7.88
-	New Westminster	ICLL	1	0	0	0	0	0.756	8.20
1962	New Westminster	ICLL	4	0	0	0	0	0.689	8.22
1963	Port Coquitlam	WCLL	Statistics Missing						
1964	New Westminster	ICLL	13	0	1	1	2	0.775	9.31
-	New Westminster	P/O	6	0	0	0	0	0.696	-
1965	New Westminster	ICLL	2	0	0	0	0	0.775	9.07
-	Coquitlam	ICLL	9	0	0	0	0	0.775	11.30
1966	Coquitlam	ICLL	5	0	0	0	0	0.750	8.03
1967	Coquitlam	ICLL	23	0	0	0	0	0.777	8.47
-	Coquitlam	P/O	5	0	1	1	0	0.675	-
1968	Portland	NLA	19	0	7	7	0	0.769	9.61
1969	New Westminster	NLA	11	0	17	17	0	0.795	8.47
-	New Westminster	P/O	15	0	14	14	0	0.787	-
1970	New Westminster	WLA	28	0	29	29	5	0.766	10.67
-	New Westminster	P/O	19	0	23	23	0	0.784	-
1971	New Westminster	WLA	19	0	18	18	0	0.773	9.52
-	New Westminster	P/O	9	0	7	7	0	0.812	-
1972	New Westminster	WLA	30	0	28	28	4	0.772	10.61
-	New Westminster	P/O	15	0	8	8	0	0.758	-
1973	Retired								
1974	New Westminster	WLA	20	0	16	16	0	0.777	10.92
-	New Westminster	P/O	4	0	7	7	0	0.793	-
1975	Retired								
1976	New Westminster	WLA	13	0	9	9	2	0.800	12.88
-	New Westminster	P/O	18	0	16	16	2	0.799	-
