= Jack Bionda =

Canadian lacrosse and ice hockey player

- Born: September 18, 1933 Huntsville, Ontario, Canada
- Died: November 3, 1999 (aged 66) London, Ontario, Canada
- Height: 6 ft 0 in (183 cm)
- Weight: 180 lb (82 kg; 12 st 12 lb)
- Position: Defence
- Shot: Left
- Played for: Toronto Maple Leafs; Boston Bruins
- Playing career: 1955–1967
- Sports career
- CLA teams: Brampton Excelsiors; Victoria Shamrocks; New Westminster Salmonbellies; Nanaimo Timbermen

Career highlights
- 3 Mann Cup championships (1958, 1959, 1962); 2 Mann Cup MVPs (1959, 1962)

John Arthur James Bionda (September 18, 1933 – November 3, 1999) was a Canadian lacrosse and hockey player. He was a lacrosse superstar, dominating the sport throughout the 1950s and early 1960s. In hockey he played for the Toronto Maple Leafs and Boston Bruins of the National Hockey League between 1955 and 1959, mainly spending his career in the minor American Hockey League and Western Hockey League.

== Lacrosse ==
Bionda was born in Huntsville, Ontario. From the time he was eleven years old he loved lacrosse, practicing for four to five hours per day. Just before his 19th birthday, Bionda led the Brampton Excelsiors to victory over the Kerrisdale Kerries of Vancouver in the 1952 Minto Cup playoffs.

In 1954, he joined the Victoria Shamrocks, capturing the league scoring title and leading the Shamrocks to the Mann Cup tournament, won by Peterborough. He played some games in 1955 and returned to the team in 1957, taking his second scoring title. The Shamrocks won the Mann Cup in 1955 and 1957, but Bionda was unable to play in either tournament due to hockey commitments.

Bionda then played for the New Westminster Salmonbellies in 1958 and 1959, winning the Mann Cup both years, and receiving the Mike Kelly Memorial Trophy as series MVP in 1959. He joined the Nanaimo Timbermen in 1960, registering his fifth scoring title with 70 goals and 48 assists, while again leading his team to the Mann Cup tournament, won by Port Credit. He made it to the Mann Cup one last time in 1962 with New Westminster, sweeping Brampton in four games to take the championship. After being held scoreless in the first game, Bionda scored eight goals and eight assists in the next three games to lead his team to the Cup. He was again named the series MVP. In 1970, Bionda played for the Huntsville Hawks senior team in the Ontario Lacrosse Association. Outside of sports, he ran a restaurant in Huntsville.

== Hockey ==
At the same time that Bionda was establishing himself as Canada's greatest lacrosse player, he also had a full career in hockey. He played junior hockey for the Toronto Marlboros of the Ontario Hockey Association from 1951 to 1954, and was signed by the Toronto Maple Leafs of the National Hockey League. Bionda played 13 games with the Leafs in the 1955–56 season, but spent most of the year with the Pittsburgh Hornets, the Leafs' affiliate in the American Hockey League. He led the AHL in penalty minutes with 190, despite playing only 46 games of the league's 64-game schedule.

Bionda was claimed by the Boston Bruins in the intraleague draft in June 1956, and would split the next three seasons between the Bruins and their AHL affiliates, the Springfield Indians and the Providence Reds. Over four seasons in the NHL, Bionda played 93 games, with three goals, 12 points, and 113 penalty minutes.

Bionda then played eight seasons in the minor professional Western Hockey League: one year with the Victoria Cougars (1959–60) and seven years with the Portland Buckaroos. Bionda was the biggest and most popular defenceman of the Buckaroos during those first seven years of the team's existence. They made it to the league championship in six of those seven years, winning twice: 1960–61 and 1964–65. Bionda retired in 1967.

== Honours ==
Bionda has been inducted into the Canadian Lacrosse Hall of Fame (1974), Canada's Sports Hall of Fame (1982), and the B.C. Sports Hall of Fame (1998).

Bionda died in London, Ontario at age 66. In June 2001, Huntsville, Ontario named its arena the Jack Bionda Arena. After the arena got a major overhaul in 2010 for the G8 Summit, the new building was named the Summit Centre and a new, Olympic size ice pad was placed alongside the old ice surface. The old ice surface kept the Jack Bionda name, and a permanent display showcasing historical pictures, newspaper and magazine clippings, old lacrosse sticks used and designed by Jack, and some other memorabilia is on display.

== Career statistics ==
=== Regular season and playoffs ===
			Regular season					Playoffs
Season	Team	League	GP	G	A	Pts	PIM	GP	G	A	Pts	PIM
1951–52	Toronto Marlboros	OHA	13	1	1	2	20	2	1	1	2	2
1952–53	Toronto Marlboros	OHA	50	2	11	13	116	7	0	1	1	8
1954–55	Sault Ste. Marie Greyhounds	NOHA	20	1	5	6	30	—	—	—	—	—
1955–56	Toronto Maple Leafs	NHL	13	0	1	1	18	—	—	—	—	—
1955–56	Pittsburgh Hornets	AHL	46	7	9	16	190	4	0	2	2	12
1956–57	Boston Bruins	NHL	35	2	3	5	43	10	0	1	1	14
1956–57	Springfield Indians	AHL	21	2	12	14	65	—	—	—	—	—
1957–58	Boston Bruins	NHL	42	1	4	5	50	—	—	—	—	—
1957–58	Springfield Indians	AHL	15	0	4	4	22	11	0	4	4	18
1958–59	Boston Bruins	NHL	3	0	1	1	2	1	0	0	0	0
1958–59	Providence Reds	AHL	66	9	17	26	144	—	—	—	—	—
1959–60	Vancouver Canucks	WHL	68	6	19	25	85	11	0	3	3	10
1960–61	Portland Buckaroos	WHL	69	7	29	36	102	14	2	4	6	27
1961–62	Portland Buckaroos	WHL	70	2	25	27	121	7	1	3	4	25
1962–63	Portland Buckaroos	WHL	70	12	28	40	99	7	0	5	5	2
1963–64	Portland Buckaroos	WHL	63	5	14	19	79	5	0	1	1	6
1964–65	Portland Buckaroos	WHL	16	0	3	3	26	6	0	1	1	2
1965–66	Portland Buckaroos	WHL	72	3	24	27	109	14	1	6	7	14
1966–67	Portland Buckaroos	WHL	41	2	7	9	24	—	—	—	—	—
WHL totals			469	37	149	186	645	64	4	23	27	86
NHL totals			93	3	9	12	113	11	0	1	1	14
