= Brandon Miller (lacrosse) =

Canadian lacrosse player (born 1979)

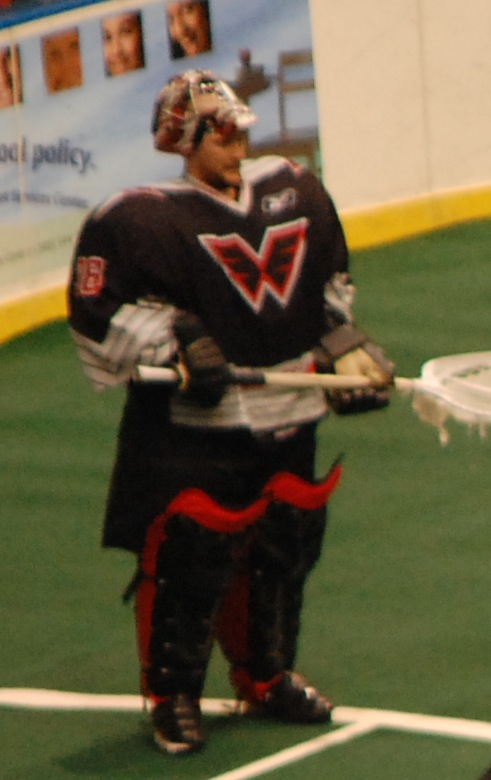
- Miller with the Philadelphia Wings in 2008

Personal information
- Born: May 4, 1979 (age 47) Orangeville, Ontario, Canada
- Height: 6 ft 1 in (185 cm)
- Weight: 190 lb (86 kg; 13 st 8 lb)

Sport
- Position: Goaltender
- Shoots: Left
- NLL draft: 70th overall, 1999; Albany Attack
- NLL team Former teams: Toronto Rock; Philadelphia Wings; Chicago Shamrox; San Jose Stealth; Albany Attack
- Pro career: 2001–2020

Career highlights
- 4x Mann Cup Champion (2002, 2008, 2013, 2014) 2x NLL All-Star (2007, 2011) 2nd Team All-Pro (2013) 4x Harry Lumley Trophy (2002, 2007, 2008, 2014) Mike Kelley Memorial Trophy (2014)

Brandon Miller (born May 4, 1979, in Orangeville, Ontario) is a Canadian former professional box lacrosse goaltender who most recently played for the Toronto Rock in the National Lacrosse League, and the Six Nations Chiefs and, formerly, the Brampton Excelsiors in the Ontario Lacrosse Association's Major Series. He has won four Mann Cups, two with each of the Chiefs and Excelsiors.

== National Lacrosse League ==
=== Albany Attack/San Jose Stealth ===
Miller started his career in 2001 with the Albany Attack (renamed the San Jose Stealth after the team relocated to California). He spent the early part of his career backing up Rob Blasdell and Anthony Cosmo, before joining the Chicago Shamrox and earning a spot as their starting goaltender.

=== Chicago Shamrox ===
Chicago selected Miller first overall after San Jose left him unprotected in the 2006 expansion draft (when Chicago and the New York Titans joined the league).

At the 2007 All-Star Game in Portland, Miller was named to the All-Star team for the first time, as a reserve for the East squad. He split time with Matt Roik, allowing eight goals on 34 shots to earn the win. He also assisted on one of the East team's 20 goals.

Despite Miller's stalwart play in net - 557 saves, facing an average of 45.19 shots per game - the Shamrox scored the third-fewest goals in the league in 2007, and missed the playoffs with a 6–10 record.

=== Philadelphia Wings ===
Midway through the 2008 season with the Shamrox struggling, Miller was dealt to the Philadelphia Wings for Roik and defenseman Brad Self.

In 2008, Philadelphia finished 10–6, and qualified as the fourth seed for the playoffs; the Shamrox finished 6–10, in last place in the East Division. The Wings took on the Buffalo Bandits in the first round of the playoffs, but were eliminated after a 14–12 loss. Miller replaced starting goaltender Rob Blasdell for the second half of the game, allowing five goals on 21 shots and picking up the loss.

Miller split time with Blasdell again in 2009, his first full season with Philadelphia. Miller played about 60 per cent of the team's minutes, registering an 11.90 GAA and 76.94% save percentage. He also contributed offensively, registered six points - including a goal on March 28, 2009, against the Colorado Mammoth. The team, however, struggled, finishing the season 7-9 and missing the playoffs.

Philadelphia again missed the playoffs in 2010, finishing last in the East division with a 5–11 record. Miller earned the lion's share of the playing time (a career-high 885 minutes), and as a result, faced the most shots in the league (764) and made the second-most saves (581). Offensively, he contributed 9 assists, good for second in the league behind Cosmo's 13.

Miller had, perhaps, his best statistical season in 2011. He posted career bests with an 11.25 goals against average and .774 save percentage. The team was plagued by a lack of goal scoring, though, finishing with a league-worst 143 goals for, finishing 5–11, tied for last in the league. Miller was selected for the All-Star game for the second time in his career.

The Wings made the playoffs in 2012 and again in 2013, but, unfortunately, were knocked out in the first round both years. In 2013, Miller finished second in Goaltender of the Year voting, behind Rochester's Matt Vinc. He finished fifth in saves for the season, and crossed the 4000-save mark for his career, becoming the 10th goaltender to achieve the mark. He was also named Defensive Player of the Week three times during the season, and was named to the Second All-Pro Team.

=== Toronto Rock ===
On March 18, 2014, Miller was traded to the Toronto Rock for Kyle Belton, a conditional 2nd-round draft choice and a 4th-round draft choice in the 2014 NLL draft. The Rock finished the season 9-9 and qualified for the playoffs, but were eliminated in the first round.

The 2015 season saw Miller split time with Nick Rose; Rose and Miller finished 3rd and 4th, respectively, in the league in Goals Against Average. The Rock finished with a league-best 14–4 record, and allowed the 3rd-fewest goals in the league. Miller was a finalist for the Goaltender of the Year Award and made his first trip to the finals, where the Rock were beaten 2 games to 0 in the Best-of-3 series by the Edmonton Rush.

In 2016, Miller became just the seventh NLL goalie to register 5,000 career regular season saves.

On September 25, 2018, Miller announced his retirement as a player. He will be joining the Toronto Rock coaching staff as goaltending coach

== Ontario Lacrosse Association ==
=== Orangeville Northmen ===
Miller and his brother Kyle Miller played Junior A lacrosse for the Orangeville Northmen.

In 2000, he shared the Dean McLeod Award - awarded to the MVP of the OLA Junior A playoffs - with Matt Vinc, as well as the Robert Melville Memorial Trophy - awarded to the Junior A league's outstanding goaltender - which he shared with teammate Kevin Samuel.

=== Brampton Excelsiors ===
In the NLL's off-season, Miller competes in the Ontario Lacrosse Association's Major Series. Miller competed for the Brampton Excelsiors until 2011. He joined the team in 2001, helping them to a Mann Cup appearance, where they were beaten in seven games by the Coquitlam Adanacs.

In 2002, he teamed again with Bob Watson in goal, and this time helped Brampton to a Mann Cup win over the Victoria Shamrocks, again in seven games, their second Mann Cup in five years. They lost just one game in the MSL playoffs on the way to the championship game, sweeping the St. Catharines Athletics and defeating the Brooklin Redmen four games to one.

The Excelsiors made a third consecutive Mann Cup appearance in 2003, again against the Shamrocks, but were unable to repeat as champions, losing in five games.

From 2004 to 2007, Miller and the Excelsiors were defeated in the MSL finals by the Peterborough Lakers, twice in seven games and twice in six games.

In 2008, the Excelsiors were finally able to overcome Peterborough, winning a decisive seventh game 7–2 at home in Brampton. They were easily able to overcome the New Westminster Salmonbellies in four games, although Miller saw no action as he backed up eventual Mann Cup MVP Anthony Cosmo.

While with the Excelsiors, he was a three-time recipient of the Harry Lumley Trophy - awarded to the goaltenders of the team that allowed the fewest goals in the regular season. In 2002, he shared the award with Bob Watson, and in 2007 and 2008, he and Cosmo received the award.

=== Six Nations Chiefs ===
He joined the Chiefs via trade from the Brampton Excelsiors; he and Rory Smith joined Six Nations in exchange for Matt Vinc, Mike Accursi, Tim O'Brien, and a 2013 first round selection. Backing up, primarily, Orangeville native Evan Kirk, Miller has compiled a 3–1 record with a 9.05 GAA in 12 games over two seasons.

In 2013, the Chiefs represented the OLA in the Mann Cup, against the Victoria Shamrocks. Miller did not appear in the first two games, but replaced Kirk in the third game, with the series tied. Miller suffered the loss, but Six Nations stormed back to take the series in six games, with Miller in goal for all but 20 minutes.

Those 20 minutes occurred in Game 5 when Victoria asked officials to check Miller's equipment, which was deemed to be illegal, resulting in a minor penalty and a game misconduct. Kirk replaced him, but he, too, had his equipment deemed illegal, resulting in forward Colin Doyle settling into net for the final 11 minutes of the 11–7 win.

Miller finished the series with a minuscule 4.45 GAA and .893 save percentage, ironically besting Shamrocks keeper Matt Vinc. The victory marked the first for the Chiefs since winning their third consecutive in 1996.

Following the 2014 season, Miller won his fourth Harry Lumley Trophy, sharing the award with Kirk. The Chiefs repeated as Mann Cup Champions, and Miller was awarded the Mike Kelley Memorial Trophy as the series MVP.

== Statistics ==
=== NLL ===
| Brandon Miller | | Regular Season | | | | | | | | Playoffs | | | | | | | |
| Season | Team | GP | Min | W | L | GA | GAA | Sv | Sv % | GP | Min | W | L | GA | GAA | Sv | Sv % |
|---|---|---|---|---|---|---|---|---|---|---|---|---|---|---|---|---|---|
| 2001 | Albany Attack | 2 | 59:30 | 0 | 1 | 14 | 14.12 | 38 | 0.731 | – | – | – | – | – | – | – | – |
| 2002 | Albany Attack | 16 | 25:31 | 1 | 0 | 7 | 16.46 | 10 | 0.588 | 2 | 0:00 | 0 | 0 | 0 | 0.00 | 0 | 0.000 |
| 2003 | Albany Attack | 15 | 113:22 | 0 | 2 | 21 | 11.11 | 71 | 0.772 | – | – | – | – | – | – | – | – |
| 2004 | San Jose Stealth | 14 | 363:09 | 4 | 3 | 73 | 12.06 | 186 | 0.718 | 1 | 16:23 | 0 | 0 | 6 | 21.97 | 9 | 0.600 |
| 2005 | San Jose Stealth | 3 | 103:34 | 0 | 1 | 18 | 10.43 | 59 | 0.766 | – | – | – | – | – | – | – | – |
| 2006 | San Jose Stealth | 14 | 256:51 | 0 | 4 | 49 | 11.45 | 150 | 0.754 | – | – | – | – | – | – | – | – |
| 2007 | Chicago Shamrox | 16 | 865:07 | 6 | 9 | 177 | 12.28 | 602 | 0.773 | – | – | – | – | – | – | – | – |
| 2008 | Chicago Shamrox | 7 | 228:49 | 1 | 2 | 65 | 17.04 | 157 | 0.707 | – | – | – | – | – | – | – | – |
| 2008 | Philadelphia Wings | 9 | 295:28 | 2 | 4 | 60 | 12.18 | 223 | 0.788 | 1 | 29:58 | 0 | 1 | 5 | 10.01 | 16 | 0.762 |
| 2009 | Philadelphia Wings | 15 | 569:39 | 6 | 4 | 113 | 11.90 | 377 | 0.769 | – | – | – | – | – | – | – | – |
| 2010 | Philadelphia Wings | 16 | 885:16 | 5 | 10 | 183 | 12.40 | 580 | 0.760 | – | – | – | – | – | – | – | – |
| 2011 | Philadelphia Wings | 16 | 853:33 | 5 | 10 | 160 | 11.25 | 549 | 0.774 | – | – | – | – | – | – | – | – |
| 2012 | Philadelphia Wings | 16 | 901:44 | 7 | 9 | 192 | 12.78 | 548 | 0.741 | 1 | 60:00 | 0 | 1 | 14 | 14.00 | 33 | 0.702 |
| 2013 | Philadelphia Wings | 15 | 831:49 | 7 | 8 | 168 | 12.12 | 556 | 0.768 | 1 | 60:00 | 0 | 1 | 10 | 10.00 | 28 | 0.737 |
| 2014 | Philadelphia Wings | 6 | 139:10 | 0 | 3 | 32 | 13.80 | 71 | 0.689 | – | – | – | – | – | – | – | – |
| 2014 | Toronto Rock | 6 | 234:43 | 3 | 1 | 35 | 8.95 | 171 | 0.830 | 1 | 60:00 | 0 | 1 | 15 | 15.00 | 42 | 0.737 |
| 2015 | Toronto Rock | 18 | 654:10 | 8 | 2 | 113 | 10.36 | 431 | 0.792 | 5 | 228:20 | 2 | 3 | 43 | 11.30 | 159 | 0.787 |
| 2016 | Toronto Rock | 17 | 364:31 | 0 | 6 | 84 | 13.83 | 223 | 0.726 | – | – | – | – | – | – | – | – |
| 2017 | Toronto Rock | 11 | 64:02 | 1 | 1 | 11 | 10.31 | 36 | 0.766 | 3 | 117:27 | 1 | 1 | 19 | 9.71 | 79 | 0.806 |
| 2018 | Toronto Rock | 15 | 54:49 | 0 | 1 | 11 | 12.04 | 35 | 0.761 | – | – | – | – | – | – | – | – |
| 2020 | Philadelphia Wings | 14 | 103:05 | 0 | 2 | 18 | 10.48 | 56 | 0.757 | – | – | – | – | – | – | – | – |
| | | 261 | 7,967:52 | 56 | 83 | 1,604 | 12.08 | 5,129 | 0.762 | 15 | 572:08 | 3 | 8 | 112 | 11.75 | 366 | 0.766 |
| Career Total: | | 276 | 8,540:00 | 59 | 91 | 1,716 | 12.06 | 5,495 | 0.762 | | | | | | | | |

GP–Games played;Min–Minutes played;W–Wins;L–Losses;GA–Goals against;GAA–Goals against average;Sv–Number of saves;Sv %–Save percentage;

=== Mann Cup ===
| | | Mann Cup |
| Season | Team | GP | Min | GA | Sv | GAA | Sv % |
|---|---|---|---|---|---|---|---|
| 2001 | Brampton | 6 | 143 | 26 | 77 | 10.85 | 74.76% |
| 2002 | Brampton* | 2 | 100 | 16 | 74 | 9.52 | 82.22% |
| 2003 | Brampton | 2 | 78 | 12 | 51 | 9.22 | 80.95% |
| 2008 | Brampton* | 0 | 0 | 0 | 0 | 0.00 | 00.00% |
| 2013 | Six Nations* | 4 | 202 | 15 | 142 | 4.45 | 89.31% |
| 2014 | Six Nations* | 6 | 377 | 38 | 217 | 6.05 | 85.10% |
| Mann Cup Totals | | 20 | 900 | 107 | 561 | 7.13 | 83.98% |

* - Won Mann Cup
