= Kyle Miller (lacrosse) =

Canadian lacrosse player

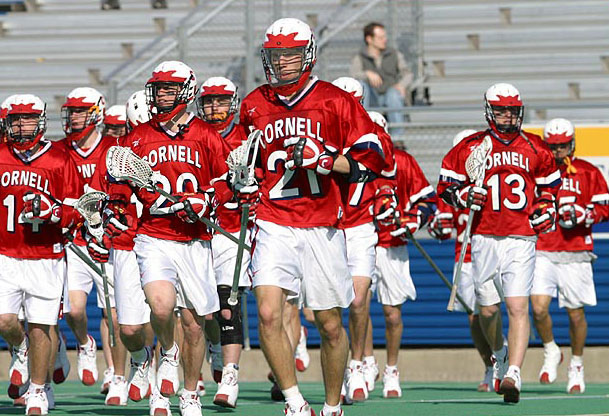
The 2004 Cornell Big Red lacrosse team

Kyle Miller (July 31, 1981 – June 8, 2013) was a Canadian field lacrosse goalkeeper. He was born in Orangeville, Ontario, the son of Kevin Miller and Sharon Denman. Kyle and his brother Brandon Miller both played junior lacrosse for the Orangeville Northmen Jr. A in the 1990s. In 2002, Kyle received a scholarship to Cornell University. It was during his time at Cornell University that he was diagnosed as having osteosarcoma. His treatment for osteosarcoma included chemotherapy and surgery. He returned to playing lacrosse for Cornell Big Red within two years of the original diagnosis.

In 2006, he graduated from Cornell University, and went on to play for the gold medal-winning Canadian national team in the World Lacrosse Championships. After retiring from playing lacrosse, he worked as a motivational speaker. His cancer returned in 2011, but this time had metastasized to his lungs. He again underwent chemotherapy and surgery, however, he died on June 8, 2013.
