= Maple Ridge Burrards =

Lacrosse club in British Columbia, Canada

Maple Ridge Burrards
City	Maple Ridge, British Columbia
League	Western Lacrosse Association
Founded	1937
Home Arena	Planet Ice - Cam Neely Arena
Colours	Royal Blue, Red, and White
Coach	Rob Williams
GM/President	Lance Andre
Provincial Championships	16
Mann Cups	8

The Maple Ridge Burrards are a Senior A box lacrosse club, based in Maple Ridge, British Columbia, Canada. The team competes in the 7-team Western Lacrosse Association (WLA). They are the second oldest team in the WLA, behind New Westminster, and have appeared in the Mann Cup 16 times, winning 8 titles, all during their time in Vancouver

Their move to Surrey and then Maple Ridge in the 90s marked the first time since the early 1880s that a Vancouver team was not present in the top amateur league in BC, a fact that hasn't changed since. The team has had moderate success in Maple Ridge, including two Mann Cup appearances, though they lost both.

== History ==
The Burrards have undergone multiple name changes since their origination in 1937. Beginning in 1996, the team has been known as the Maple Ridge Burrards:

- 1937–1937 Vancouver Burrard Olympics
- 1938–1949 Vancouver Burrards
- 1950–1950 Vancouver Burrard Westerns (merged with Richmond Farmers)
- 1951–1951 Vancouver Combines
- 1952–1958 Vancouver Pilseners
- 1959–1969 Vancouver Carlings
- 1970–1993 Vancouver Burrards (transferred to Surrey)
- 1994–1995 Surrey Burrards (transferred to Maple Ridge)
- 1996–present Maple Ridge Burrards

Retired Numbers

The following players have had their jersey numbers retired by the WLA Burrards club.

- 1 - Walt Lee
- 1 - Jack Green
- 2 - Don Hamilton
- 5 - John Cavallin
- 14 - Harry Buchanan
- 18 - Bill Chisholm
- 21 - Roy Cavallin
- 29 - Dave Evans

== All-time record ==
Season	Team name	Games	Win	Losses	Tie	GF	GA	Points	Playoffs
1937	Vancouver Burrard Olympics	28	8	20	0	355	457	16	did not qualify
1938	Vancouver Burrards	24	14	10	0	366	331	28	defeated in Semi-Finals
1939	Vancouver Burrards	24	19	5	0	398	276	38	defeated in Finals
1940	Vancouver Burrards	24	17	7	2	433	301	36	defeated in Mann Cup
1941	Vancouver Burrards	24	17	7	0	362	291	34	defeated in Finals
1942	Vancouver Burrards	24	14	9	1	254	223	29	defeated in Semi-Finals
1943	Vancouver Burrards	18	10	8	0	245	216	20	defeated in Finals
1944	Vancouver Burrards	24	10	14	0	265	289	20	defeated in Semi-Finals
1945	Vancouver Burrards	24	20	4	0	404	278	40	Won Mann Cup
1946	Vancouver Burrards	24	12	11	1	316	325	25	defeated in Finals
1947	Vancouver Burrards	24	15	8	1	357	315	31	defeated in Finals
1948	Vancouver Burrards	24	16	8	0	349	280	32	defeated in Finals
1949	Vancouver Burrards	16	9	7	0	217	186	18	Won Mann Cup
1950	Vancouver Burrard Westerns	30	14	16	0	415	413	28	defeated in Semi-Finals
1951	Vancouver Combines	32	17	14	1	435	412	35	defeated in Mann Cup
1952	Vancouver Pilseners/Vancouver Lacrosse Club	32	17	15	0	411	419	34	defeated in Mann Cup
1953	Vancouver Pilseners	32	19	12	1	372	306	39	defeated in Semi-Finals
1954	Vancouver Pilseners	32	14	18	0	341	326	28	defeated in Semi-Finals
1955	Vancouver Pilseners	32	12	20	0	316	418	24	defeated in Semi-Finals
1956	Vancouver Pilseners	30	16	13	1	310	320	33	defeated in Finals
1957	Vancouver Pilseners	30	10	20	0	279	327	20	did not qualify
1958	Vancouver Pilseners	30	16	13	1	320	312	33	defeated in Semi-Finals
1959	Vancouver Carlings	30	15	14	1	309	287	31	defeated in Semi-Finals
1960	Vancouver Carlings	30	20	10	0	311	248	40	defeated in Finals
1961	Vancouver Carlings	30	19	9	2	360	256	40	Won Mann Cup
1962	Vancouver Carlings	32	26	6	0	337	212	52	defeated in Finals
1963	Vancouver Carlings	30	22	7	1	326	249	45	Won Mann Cup
1964	Vancouver Carlings	32	23	9	0	367	274	46	Won Mann Cup
1965	Vancouver Carlings	30	20	10	0	313	261	40	defeated in Semi-Finals
1966	Vancouver Carlings	30	15	14	1	287	284	31	defeated in Mann Cup
1967	Vancouver Carlings	30	16	12	2	291	264	34	Won Mann Cup
1968	Vancouver Carlings	38	22	16	0	410	379	44	defeated in Quarter-Finals
1969	Vancouver Carlings	29	9	20	0	276	369	18	defeated in Semi-Finals
1970	Vancouver Burrards	30	16	14	0	348	353	32	defeated in Semi-Finals
1971	Vancouver Burrards	31	12	18	1	355	396	25	defeated in Semi-Finals
1972	Vancouver Burrards	36	19	17	0	435	403	38	defeated in Finals
1973	Vancouver Burrards	25	17	8	0	348	282	34	defeated in Mann Cup
1974	Vancouver Burrards	24	11	13	0	294	291	22	defeated in Finals
1975	Vancouver Burrards	24	14	10	0	322	308	28	Won Mann Cup
1976	Vancouver Burrards	24	10	14	0	312	329	20	defeated in Finals
1977	Vancouver Burrards	24	16	7	1	303	303	33	Won Mann Cup
1978	Vancouver Burrards	24	11	13	0	317	333	22	defeated in Semi-Finals
1979	Vancouver Burrards	30	11	19	0	373	435	22	defeated in Semi-Finals
1980	Vancouver Burrards	24	11	13	0	297	292	22	defeated in Semi-Finals
1981	Vancouver Burrards	24	12	12	0	294	286	24	defeated in Semi-Finals
1982	Vancouver Burrards	24	12	12	0	293	308	24	defeated in playoff round-robin
1983	Vancouver Burrards	24	14	10	0	276	260	28	defeated in Finals
1984	Vancouver Burrards	24	9	15	0	220	263	18	did not qualify
1985	Vancouver Burrards	24	11	13	0	204	238	22	did not qualify
1986	Vancouver Burrards	24	13	11	0	234	214	26	defeated in Semi-Finals
1987	Vancouver Burrards	24	10	14	0	258	273	20	defeated in Semi-Finals
1988	Vancouver Burrards	24	11	13	0	204	204	22	defeated in Semi-Finals
1989	Vancouver Burrards	24	9	15	0	221	241	18	defeated in Semi-Finals
1990	Vancouver Burrards	24	16	8	0	236	193	32	defeated in Mann Cup
1991	Vancouver Burrards	24	8	16	0	187	251	16	defeated in Semi-Finals
1992	Vancouver Burrards	24	9	15	0	192	223	18	did not qualify
1993	Vancouver Burrards	24	4	20	0	220	312	8	did not qualify
1994	Surrey Burrards	20	8	12	0	167	205	16	defeated in Semi-Finals
1995	Surrey Burrards	25	5	19	1	214	262	11	did not qualify
1996	Maple Ridge Burrards	20	11	8	1	207	179	23	defeated in Semi-Finals
1997	Maple Ridge Burrards	20	11	8	1	186	202	23	defeated in Semi-Finals
1998	Maple Ridge Burrards	25	15	8	2	262	228	32	defeated in Semi-Finals
1999	Maple Ridge Burrards	25	10	15	0	221	255	20	did not qualify
2000	Maple Ridge Burrards	25	9	16	0	295	321	18	did not qualify
2001	Maple Ridge Burrards	20	4	16	0	201	296	8	did not qualify
2002	Maple Ridge Burrards	20	3	15	2	227	307	8	did not qualify
2003	Maple Ridge Burrards	20	5	15	0	184	246	10	did not qualify
2004	Maple Ridge Burrards	20	8	12	0	197	219	16	defeated in Semi-Finals
2005	Maple Ridge Burrards	18	9	8	1	181	189	19	defeated in Semi-Finals
2006	Maple Ridge Burrards	18	7	11	0	187	200	14	did not qualify
2007	Maple Ridge Burrards	18	7	11	0	183	194	14	did not qualify
2008	Maple Ridge Burrards	18	5	13	0	156	182	10	did not qualify
2009	Maple Ridge Burrards	18	7	11	0	178	192	14	did not qualify
2010	Maple Ridge Burrards	18	9	9	0	165	162	18	defeated in Semi-Finals
2011	Maple Ridge Burrards	18	8	10	0	173	184	16	defeated in Semi-Finals
2012	Maple Ridge Burrards	18	4	13	1	156	188	9	did not qualify
2013	Maple Ridge Burrards	18	8	10	0	184	189	16	did not qualify
2014	Maple Ridge Burrards	18	9	8	1	150	125	19	defeated in Finals
2015	Maple Ridge Burrards	18	9	9	0	173	168	18	defeated in Semi-Finals
2016	Maple Ridge Burrards	18	11	6	1	158	143	23	defeated in Mann Cup
2017	Maple Ridge Burrards	18	12	6	0	164	154	24	defeated in Semi-Finals
2018	Maple Ridge Burrards	18	9	8	1	158	159	19	defeated in Mann Cup
2019	Maple Ridge Burrards	18	12	6	0	171	121	24	defeated in Finals
2020	season cancelled								
2021	season cancelled								
2022	Maple Ridge Burrards	18	1	17	0	152	220	2	did not qualify
2023	Maple Ridge Burrards	18	4	13	1	141	179	9	did not qualify
2024	Maple Ridge Burrards	18	9	9	0	158	162	18	defeated in Semi-Finals
2025	Maple Ridge Burrards	18	7	9	2	152	155	16	defeated in Semi-Finals
2026	Maple Ridge Burrards	18	13	5	0	176	144	26	defeated in Semi-Finals
