= Pat Baker (lacrosse) =

Canadian lacrosse player (1939–2022)

Personal information
- Born: Patrick David Baker; May 27, 1939 St. Catharines, Ontario, Canada
- Died: October 4, 2022 (aged 83) Peterborough, Ontario, Canada

Sport
- Position: Goaltender
- OSALL/ NLA team: Peterborough Lakers (OSALL); Peterborough Lakers (NLA); Brooklin Redmen (OSALL); St. Catharines Athletics (OSALL); Brampton Ramblers (OSALL)
- Pro career: 1959–1973

Career highlights
- Minto Cup: 1958; Mann Cup: 1966, 1973; Mann Cup MVP: 1973; NLA Championship: 1969; Harry Lumley Award: 1962, 1963, 1964, 1965, 1967, 1970, 1971, 1972

Patrick David Baker (May 27, 1939 – October 4, 2022) was a Canadian professional and amateur box lacrosse goaltender. He was an elite goaltender in his time, winning the Mann Cup Canadian Major Championship two times and being named the top goaltender in the Ontario Lacrosse Association eight times. Baker is a member of the Canadian Lacrosse Hall of Fame. He is considered a pioneer of the breakout pass.

== Career ==
Baker first played lacrosse at the age of nine in Port Dalhousie, Ontario. After three years of playing, he helped his team win the Ontario peewee championship. The next day he and his family moved to Peterborough, Ontario. At 17, he almost died of a childhood illness.

In 1958, Baker signed with the Brampton ABC's of the Ontario Junior A Lacrosse League and won the Minto Cup as Canadian Junior A Champions with them that season. During his winters he played in the Ontario Hockey Association with the Hamilton Tiger Cubs (the Detroit Red Wings junior entry) for three seasons as a forward.

Baker started off his Major/Senior A career in 1959 with Peterborough Lakers. The team went belly up after two seasons and he signed with the Brooklin Redmen instead. After five seasons in Brooklin he returned to a newly formed Peterborough club in 1966 until 1973.

In 1968, he and his team joined the National Lacrosse Association and turned professional for two seasons. In his second season in the league he won the NLA's professional championship.

Baker would win two Mann Cup Canadian Major Senior A championships: 1966 and 1973 with Peterborough. He also won the 1969 NLA Championship with Peterborough at the professional level. He was named 1973 Mann Cup most valuable player and won best goaltender in the Ontario Lacrosse Association ten times. Baker was named Peterborough's sportsman of the year in 1969, to the Canadian Lacrosse Hall of Fame in 1980, the Ontario Lacrosse Hall of Fame in 1981, and the Peterborough and District's Sports Hall of Fame in 1983. In 2008, Baker and his 1958 Minto Cup winning junior team were named to the Brampton Sports Hall of Fame. In 2012, the 1956-59 Brampton Minto Cup dynasty was inducted into the Canadian Hall of Fame, Baker playing for the 1958 edition of the team.

Pat Baker died from complications of COVID-19 in Peterborough, Ontario, on October 4, 2022, at the age of 83.

== Stats ==
Source: Wamper's Bible of Lacrosse

Season	Team	League	GP	G	A	P	PIM	Team GAA
1955	Peterborough	OJALL	-	0	0	0	-	-
1956	Peterborough	OJALL	-	0	23	23	-	12.85
-	Peterborough	P/O	-	-	-	-	-	-
1957	Peterborough	OJALL	-	0	27	27	-	7.50
-	Peterborough	P/O	-	-	-	-	-	-
1958	Brampton	OJALL	-	0	4	4	-	-
-	Brampton	P/O	-	-	-	-	-	-
-	Brampton	Minto	2	0	0	0	0	5.00
1959	Peterborough	OSALL	12	1	3	4	2	8.52
1960	Peterborough	OSALL	23	1	13	14	6	10.96
-	Peterborough	P/O	5	0	2	2	0	13.60
1961	Brooklin	OSALL	21	1	7	8	6	10.08
-	Brooklin	P/O	7	0	2	2	0	-
1962	Brooklin	OSALL	24	1	25	26	9	8.17
-	Brooklin	P/O	10	0	6	6	4	-
-	Brampton	Mann	3	0	1	1	0	-
1963	Brooklin	OSALL	24	0	8	8	4	7.46
-	Brooklin	P/O	7	0	8	8	10	-
-	St. Catherines	Mann	3	0	5	5	2	-
1964	Brooklin	OSALL	24	0	16	16	17	8.21
-	Brooklin	P/O	13	0	8	8	2	-
-	Brooklin	Mann	7	0	5	5	2	-
1965	Brooklin	OSALL	23	0	18	18	10	8.13
-	Brooklin	P/O	11	0	5	5	4	-
-	Brooklin	Mann	7	0	2	2	2	-
1966	Peterborough	OSALL	7	0	6	6	6	9.48
-	Peterborough	P/O	8	0	8	8	4	-
-	Peterborough	Mann	5	0	3	3	0	-
1967	Peterborough	OSALL	18	0	12	12	11	8.83
-	Peterborough	P/O	7	0	3	3	8	-
1968	Peterborough	NLA	37	0	43	43	25	10.45
-	Peterborough	P/O	11	0	4	4	10	-
1969	Peterborough	NLA	24	0	41	41	32	11.36
-	Peterborough	P/O	18	0	23	23	9	-
1970	Peterborough	OSALL	22	2	45	49	29	11.13
-	Peterborough	P/O	5	0	9	9	0	-
-	Peterborough	Mann	4	0	3	3	0	-
1971	Peterborough	OSALL	31	1	38	39	28	10.66
-	Peterborough	P/O	11	0	12	12	6	-
1972	Peterborough	MSL	31	0	13	13	14	13.00
-	Peterborough	P/O	13	0	6	6	4	-
1973	Peterborough	MSL	23	0	10	10	-	12.92
-	Peterborough	P/O	9	1	2	3	-	-
-	Peterborough	Mann	1	0	0	0	0	5.00
