= National Lacrosse Association =

Defunct sports league

- Sport: Box lacrosse
- Founded: 1968
- Folded: 1969
- No. of teams: 8
- Countries: United States and Canada
- Last champion: New Westminster Salmonbellies

The National Lacrosse Association was a professional box lacrosse league that operated in 1968–1969 with teams from both the United States and Canada.

Due to poor attendance, the league folded in March 1969. After the folding, two teams (the Maple Leafs and Peterborough Lakers) joined the ill-fated Eastern Professional Lacrosse League which went defunct after one season. The NLA was the first attempt at a professional box lacrosse league in history. After cessation in 1969, the next popular pro lacrosse league would be the National Lacrosse League (1974–75).

== History ==
The National Lacrosse Association was founded in 1968 by entrepreneurs looking to capitalize on the game's exciting aspects. Most of the teams in the NLA were amateur-level teams from Canada that decided to make their teams professional.

Some organizations drew considerable crowds and had games televised while other teams struggled to bring in even a couple hundred fans. Players' salaries averaged between $3000 and $4000 per year.

In the league's one and only season, The New Westminster Salmonbellies emerged as the champions by beating the Detroit Olympics four games to two.

== Teams ==
Eastern Division Western Division

EASTERN DIVISION

- Detroit Olympics
- Montreal Canadians
- Peterborough Lakers
- Toronto Maple Leafs

WESTERN DIVISION

- New Westminster Salmonbellies
- Portland Adanacs
- Vancouver Carlings
- Victoria Shamrocks

== 1968 season ==
Division	Team	Wins	Losses	GF	GA	Points
EAST	Detroit Olympics	24	14	511	441	48
EAST	Peterborough Lakers	21	17	478	397	42
EAST	Montreal Canadians	14	24	410	514	28
EAST	Toronto Maple Leafs	13	25	375	452	26
WEST	Portland Adanacs	24	14	413	365	48
WEST	Vancouver Carlings	22	16	410	379	44
WEST	New Westminster Salmonbellies	19	19	437	426	38
WEST	Victoria Shamrocks	15	23	337	397	30

Playoffs

Quarterfinals
1	Detroit Olympics
4	Peterborough Lakers	4 games
6	Montreal Canadians	3 games
2	Portland Adanacs
3	Vancouver Carlings	3 games
5	New Westminster Salmonbellies	4 games

Semifinals
1	Detroit Olympics	4 games
4	Peterborough Lakers	0 games
2	Portland Adanacs	2 games
5	New Westminster Salmonbellies	4 games

Finals
1	Detroit Olympics	2 games
5	New Westminster Salmonbellies	4 games
