= New Westminster Salmonbellies =

Lacrosse Team in Canada

Coordinates: 49°12′53″N 122°54′21″W

- Nicknames: Bellies
- Sport: Box Lacrosse
- Founded: 12 May 1888; 138 years ago
- Current League: Western Lacrosse Association
- Home Arena: Queen's Park Arena
- City: New Westminster, British Columbia
- Team Colours: Red, White, Blue
- Coach: Jason Bishop
- History: New Westminster Lacrosse Club; 1888-1899; New Westminster Salmonbellies; 1900-1950; New Westminster Commandos; 1951; New Westminster Salmonacs; 1952-1953; New Westminster Royals; 1954; New Westminster Salmonbellies; 1955-1958; New Westminster O'Keefes; 1959-1965; New Westminster Salmonbellies; 1966-68; New Westminster Labatt Blues; 1969; New Westminster Salmonbellies; 1969-present
- Mann Cups: 24
- Minto Cups: 11 (senior professional) (Note: The senior team won 11 titles prior to 1937. The Junior A Salmonbellies have won 2 titles since the trophy became the junior national championship trophy in 1937.) 2 (junior 'a')
- League championships (box lacrosse): 35
- Provincial championships (field lacrosse): 21 (professional); 11 (amateur)

Olympic medal record

Lacrosse

Representing Canada
Gold medal – first place	1928 Amsterdam (Note: Gold medal shared by three teams.)	Team

The New Westminster Salmonbellies are a Men's Senior 'A' lacrosse team located in New Westminster, BC. Their home arena is Queen's Park Arena. They compete as part of the Western Lacrosse Association and have won the Mann Cup 24 times, with their most recent championship in 1991. The 1968–1972 teams were collectively inducted into the Canadian Lacrosse Hall of Fame in 2004.

The Bellies are the most successful senior team in the country, having won 6 more cups than the 2nd place Peterborough Lakers. When it comes to just western teams, they outshine their competition to the enth degree, with their closest competitor, the Victoria Shamrocks, having only won 9. They have appeared in the Mann Cup 46 times, with Peterborough having only made it 26 times, and Brampton and Victoria having appeared 22 times each.

They won their first Mann Cup in 1915. Prior to 1932, they played as a field lacrosse team but in May 1932 box lacrosse was adopted for the senior league in British Columbia - and the Salmonbellies have been a box lacrosse team since then. The Salmonbellies have won the Mann Cup more than any other lacrosse team. They had won at least one Mann Cup in every decade since the inception of the trophy, before the 2000s. There has been a drought of Mann Cup success since the 90s, with the team losing all 9 of their appearances in the championship series since their 1991 title, including 3 straight from 2008 to 2010. Their most recent appearance was the 2025 series, where they faced the Six Nations Chiefs, who defeated the Salmonbellies in 7 games to claim their 9th title.

In 1928, the New Westminster Salmonbellies were selected to represent Canada in field lacrosse at the 1928 Olympic Games in Amsterdam, as they were the defending Mann Cup champions. After a 3–6 loss to the United States (represented by the Johns Hopkins University team) and a 9–5 victory over Great Britain, all three teams were tied in the standings and were each awarded gold medals.

Salmonbellie Alumni Paul Parnell, Wayne Goss, Eric Cowieson, Jack Bionda, Cliff Sepka, Dave Durante and Geordie Dean have all had their numbers retired by the team. There are more Salmonbellies alumni in the Canadian Lacrosse Hall of Fame than from any other team.

The Salmonbellie name arose from a taunt given by an opposing team's fan during an early game. The fan called the New West team "salmonbellies" referring to the fact that salmon was considered a lowly food at the time. But the players liked the name, concluding that the belly was the prime portion on the fish, so the name was adopted and has stuck for over a century. The name is never spelled with a "y" even when one writes about an individual "Salmonbellie."

Salmonbellies vs. the World: The Story of Lacrosse's Most Famous Team & Their Greatest Opponents (Caitlin Press, 2013) by W.B. MacDonald, is an in-depth, illustrated book which shares stories of the players' lives, successes and heartbreaks.

== Affiliated Teams ==
=== Jr A ===
The Jr A Salmonbellies play in the BC Junior A Lacrosse League. Similar to the Senior team, they play out of Queen's Park Arena. The team has won 2 Minto Cups, in 1960 and 1994.

=== Senior B ===
A Salmonbellies Senior B team plays in the 6 team West Coast Senior Lacrosse Association. Prior to 2022 they were called the Royal City Capitals, but changed their name to match the Senior A team after entering an official partnership. The team is notable for having only won 4 games since the restart of the league post-covid. The team finished the 2026 season winless, extending their streak to 44 games, dating to May 15th, 2024

=== Senior Women ===
New Westminster plays a team in the Womens Western Lacrosse Association (WWLA). The Salmonbellies have won 6 senior women's league titles, 2014-2017, 2019 and 2022. In the 2025 season they finished in 3rd place, after beating Victoria in the bronze medal game. They were one of 5 teams invited to compete in the inaugural 2025 WBOX GRIT tournament in Port Coquitlam, where they finished 3rd. New West finished 4th out of 6 in the 2026 WWLA season, losing to Nanaimo in the bronze medal game. In the 2026 edition of the WBOX tournament, which was expanded to 8 teams, the Bellies finished 6th after losing to the Aussie Dingoes 5-4.

=== Minor and Junior Women ===
The Salmonbellies have a number of teams playing in all age groups in the Lower Mainland Minor Lacrosse Commission.

== Founding ==
The New Westminster lacrosse club was founded on May 12, 1888, but did not play their first home game in the Royal City until June 8, 1889, a 3–1 loss to Vancouver.

It was stated in the May 11, 1888, issue of the New Westminster Daily British Columbian newspaper that "All lacrosse players are requested to meet on the cricket grounds this evening for the purpose of forming a lacrosse club."

On May 14, 1888, the Daily British Columbian informed that "On Saturday evening a meeting of lacrosse players was held and a club formed. Mr. Glover was appointed chairman pro tem and Mr. Lewis permanent secretary and treasurer. A committee was formed to draft rules and by-laws, and perform other duties in connection with the organization of the club. Practises [sic] will be held every Wednesday and Friday evening for the present, and it is to be hoped that every lover of the game will join the club and assist in making it a success in every way. It is the intention to try and arrange a match with Vancouver on July 1st."

== History ==
=== Field Lacrosse (1889-1931) ===
After losing their first match, New West traveled to Kamloops aboard the CPR to play Vancouver once again, in the annual picnic. The two played for the Alhambra Cup, which had been donated by the Vancouver club as a provincial trophy. Victoria was not invited to Kamloops, so they had no chance to challenge the other two teams. The 1889 championship game ended in a 2-2 draw, and many suspected that sports betting had influenced that result.

In 1890, the British Columbia Amateur Lacrosse Association was founded by the three BC teams in order to standardize and regulate play. In the first season under this new organization, New Westminster won all 6 games and claimed their first championship. The Royal City would go on to win 3 more titles in the 1890s.

At the end of the 1894 season, Victoria and New West were tied atop the standings. A championship game was scheduled at Brockton Oval in Vancouver. The New West team arrived late, and the game was eventually called off due to darkness. When the call was made, Victoria was winning 3-2. Much to Victoria's anger, the referee refused to give them the title, and they left the BCALA.

At the turn of the century, New West embarked on a tour of Eastern Canada, which caused some disruptions to the league schedule.

1903 saw what was dubbed at the time as the 'greatest lacrosse game in western Canada' when Vancouver and New Westminster played in front of 11,000 fans at Brockton Oval.

The 1903 season ended with an inflammation of tensions between New West and Vancouver. The dispute raged on into 1904, and ended when New Westminster withdrew from the league for that season.

What was possibly the greatest escalation of the rivalry between the Lower Mainland's two greatest teams came in 1908 when a overzealous New West fan began pelting Vancouver players with eggs. This kicked off a riot between those in attendance. One of the Vancouver staff, George Paris, retaliated by pulling his gun and shooting at the crowd. No one was killed in the incident, but Vancouver refused to play New Westminster for a period of time afterwards.

Earlier in 1908, the amateur Salmonbellies had travelled east and played Montreal and Ottawa, who were both pro teams. This tainted their status as amateur, and as a result the BCALA was dissolved and reorganized as the British Columbia Lacrosse Association. This new organization would contain two members, New Westminster and their bitter rivals in Vancouver.

In 1912, the two team league almost folded when the Salmonbellies threatened to withdraw. Although the dispute was resolved that year, the very next year another problem between the two led to Vancouver leaving and the cancellation of the season.

The 1914 season was also cancelled midway through when the Vancouver club that replaced the departing one from last season folded. The Bellies would win their first of many Mann Cups in 1915. The Salmonbellies were temporarily disbanded during the First World War, with many players joining the army. Members who didn't sign up for the war effort played lacrosse as a fundraiser. In 1916, a series of games between the Vancouver Patriotic Club and the Maple Leafs, who contained many New West players, was held. Another series of matches were held in 1917.

Post WW1, a new governing body was created to replace the old BCLA. The Mainland Lacrosse Association had two initial members, New Westminster and Vancouver. A dispute arose when the Minto Cup trustees refused to recognize the results of the MLA season, and thus deprived Vancouver of the Cup. New West claimed that their club had not been fully reorganized at the time.

The BCLA returned in 1919, with the Salmonbellies and the Vancouver Terminals making up its membership.

A second Vancouver team was formed in 1921, taking the name Vancouver Lacrosse Club. This new team had many players from the Terminals who signed for higher pay. New Westminster refused to play this new team, and instead the VLC left to form a new league with Victoria.

Professional lacrosse in BC died a quiet death in 1924 when the season was cancelled due to the owner of the Terminals dying. No 1925 season was scheduled. Instead the Salmonbellies began playing in the amateur league once again. The newly created British Columbia Coast Lacrosse Association consisted of 5 teams: New West, Vancouver, North Shore, Victoria and Nanaimo.

The BCCLA lost many of its clubs in the 1924 season. Only New West and Vancouver continued as Senior A teams. The rest of the league moved down to Senior B status.

1927 saw the Salmonbellies win the national championship for the 10th time, defeating the eastern champion Weston.

New West traveled internationally in 1928, to Los Angeles to represent Canada in the Olympics. The three team competition between Canada, the US and UK finished tied in the standings and all three were awarded the gold medal. Their absence in the Lower Mainland meant no senior season was played.

The final three seasons of field lacrosse play saw the Salmonbellies play a different Vancouver team each year. The Waterfront Workers played in 1929, a new Vancouver Lacrosse Club in 1930, and Vancouver Home Oil in 1931.

=== Box Lacrosse (1932-Present) ===
Along with the rest of the Canadian teams, New Westminster adopted box lacrosse in 1932. Three teams competed in this first year, the Salmonbellies, Vancouver Athletic Club and Squamish Indians. The first box game in the city, which was between the Bellies and the Indians, was later protested and removed from the standings. In 1933, a second New West team, named the Adanacs, were founded. A fierce rivalry would develop between these two clubs.

The Inter-City Lacrosse League was founded in 1934, and would remain the main senior league in BC until it was renamed the Western Lacrosse Association in 1969. New Westminster would win its first Mann Cup under box rules in 1937. The Adanacs would fold temporarily in 1942 due to WW2.

The Salmonbellies and Adanacs merged into one team in 1951, at first adopting the name the Commandos, then later the Salmonacs and Royals before returning to Salmonbellies.

The teams name was changed to O'Keefe's in 1959 after their new sponsor. They would eventually return once again to their old name in 1966. The Bellies briefly played in North Surrey in 1967 due to renovations to Queen's Park Arena.

The biggest change since the adoption of box lacrosse came in 1968, when a new professional league, containing teams from western Canada, eastern Canada and even the US was founded. The National Lacrosse Association incorporated the Inter-City teams, Vancouver, New West, Victoria and Portland, into its 8 team league. The pro league was short-lived, but the Salmonbellies won the 1968 championship, adding it to their long list of titles.

The NLA folded the next year, and the western teams rejoined their amateur league, now renamed to the WLA.

New Westminster would continue to play in the WLA, and the league would experience a period of relative stability. From 1969 to 1991, they would win another 8 Mann Cups.

Since 1991, the team has had an uncharacteristic drought of national success. The arrival in Ontario in 1993 of the Six Nations Chiefs would prove a bad sign for the Bellies, as they would play foil to New West's title hopes on many an occasion.

The Salmonbellies won a threepeat of WLA titles from 2008-2010, but could not conquer the best of Ontario.

In the 2023 Mann Cup series, the Salmonbellies hosted the Chiefs, who beat them 4 games to 1. Two years later, the two would once again meet in the Royal City, with the hosts jumping to a 2-0 lead after winning game 1 in the last second and game 2 by four goals. Game 3 was a rought for the Chiefs, who smashed the Bellies 19-9. Late in the third game a brawl broke out between the two fanbases in the stands. The Chiefs tied the series 2-2 with a 10-3 win. The Bellies didnt go quietly, winning game 5 16-11, but Six Nations proved their dominance, winning the two remaining games 10-6 and 12-7 to take their 3rd consecutive and 9th overall Cup. The 2025 series was the first time Six Nations had to play all 7 games to win the Mann.

== Honours ==
=== League / provincial championships ===
Western Lacrosse Association

- Champions (23): 1969, 1970, 1971, 1972, 1974, 1976, 1980, 1981, 1982, 1985, 1986, 1987, 1989, 1991, 1992, 1994, 1995, 2008, 2009, 2010, 2017, 2023, 2025

National Lacrosse Association (West Division)

- Champions (1): 1968

Inter-City Lacrosse League

- Champions (10): 1934, 1937, 1942, 1943, 1944, 1946, 1958, 1959, 1962, 1965

BCALA Senior Box Lacrosse League

- Champions (1): 1933

=== National championships ===
Mann Cup

- Champions (24): 1915, 1916, 1917, 1920, 1921, 1922, 1923, 1924, 1925, 1927, 1937, 1943, 1958, 1959, 1962, 1965, 1970, 1972, 1974, 1976, 1981, 1986, 1989, 1991
- Runner-up: 1929, 1930, 1931, 1933, 1934, 1938, 1942, 1944, 1946, 1969, 1971, 1980, 1982, 1985, 1987, 1992, 1994, 1995, 2008, 2009, 2010, 2017, 2023, 2025

Minto Cup

- Champions (11): 1908, 1909, 1910, 1912, 1913, 1914, 1915, 1919, 1921, 1922, 1924
- Runner-up: 1902, 1911, 1920

=== Other ===
National Lacrosse Association

- Champions (1): 1968

Summer Olympics

- Champions (1): 1928

== Player records ==
=== Mann Cup MVPs ===
Salmonbellie winners of the Mike Kelly Memorial Trophy (Major/Senior A):

- 1943 Bill Wilkes
- 1944 Ike Hildebrand
- 1958 Norm McKay
- 1959 Jack Bionda (New Westminster O'Keefes)
- 1962 Jack Bionda (New Westminster O'Keefes)
- 1965 Les Norman
- 1970 Paul Parnell
- 1972 Paul Parnell
- 1974 Ken Winzoski
- 1976 Dave Durante
- 1981 Wayne Goss
- d 1986 Geordie Dean
- 1987 Eric Cowieson (jointly held with Jim Meredith of the Brooklyn Redmen)
- 1989 Ben Hieltjes
- 1991 Geordie Dean

== Season-by-season records ==
=== All-time field lacrosse record ===
New Westminster Salmonbellies (Senior Amateur Field Lacrosse 1888-1931)
Season	Team	GP	W	L	T	GF	GA	PTS	PLAYOFFS
1888	New Westminster	0	0	0	0	0	0	0	did not play any games in 1888
1889	New Westminster	4	1	2	1	7	9	-	played challenge games in 1889
1890	New Westminster	4	4	0	0	13	4	8	Provincial Champions
1891	New Westminster	4	2	2	0	11	8	4	
1892	New Westminster	8	3	5	0	24	21	6	
1893	New Westminster	6	1	5	0	13	23	2	
1894	New Westminster	8	6	2	0	30	19	12	Provincial Champions
1895	New Westminster	8	5	3	0	17	14	10	Provincial Champions
1896	New Westminster	8	1	6	1	16	28	2	
1897	New Westminster	8	4	3	1	23	22	8	Provincial Champions
1898	New Westminster	8	5	2	1	24	11	11	Provincial Champions
1899	New Westminster	8	7	1	0	34	9	14	Provincial Champions
1900	New Westminster Salmonbellies	4	4	0	0	20	4	8	Provincial Champions
1901	New Westminster Salmonbellies	9	8	0	1	83	12	17	Provincial Champions
1902	New Westminster Salmonbellies	8	7	1	0	85	14	14	Provincial Champions
1903	New Westminster Salmonbellies	8	5	2	1	52	25	11	
1904	New Westminster Salmonbellies	0	0	0	0	0	0	0	did not compete
1905	New Westminster Salmonbellies	12	10	2	0	130	36	20	Provincial Champions
1906	New Westminster Salmonbellies	9	8	1	0	80	35	16	Provincial Champions
1907	New Westminster Salmonbellies	7	6	1	0	60	35	12	Provincial Champions
1908	New Westminster Salmonbellies	7	7	0	0	88	14	14	won Minto Cup
1909	New Westminster Salmonbellies	5	4	1	0	44	29	8	
1910	New Westminster Salmonbellies	6	1	5	0	31	43	2	
1911	New Westminster Salmonbellies	8	3	5	0	30	55	6	
1912	New Westminster Salmonbellies	12	4	7	1	35	70	9	
1913	New Westminster Salmonbellies	8	4	4	0	53	43	8	
1914	New Westminster Salmonbellies	8	4	4	0	53	34	8	
1915	New Westminster Salmonbellies	6	5	1	0	46	11	10	won Mann Cup
1916	suspended operations	-	-	-	-	-	-	-	retained Mann Cup; no challenges
1917	suspended operations	-	-	-	-	-	-	-	retained Mann Cup; no challenges
1918	New Westminster Salmonbellies	6	0	4	2	12	30	2	
1919	New Westminster Salmonbellies	7	3	4	0	49	51	6	
1920	New Westminster Salmonbellies	8	6	0	2	49	28	14	won Mann Cup
1921	New Westminster Salmonbellies	8	6	1	1	40	23	13	won Mann Cup
1922	New Westminster Salmonbellies	12	7	4	1	47	25	15	won Mann Cup
1923	New Westminster Salmonbellies	12	9	1	2	79	23	20	won Mann Cup
1924	New Westminster Salmonbellies	13	9	2	2	60	27	20	won Mann Cup
1925	New Westminster Salmonbellies	14	9	5	0	65	51	18	won Mann Cup
1926	New Westminster Salmonbellies	8	5	3	0	33	25	10	
1927	New Westminster Salmonbellies	12	10	1	1	79	23	21	won Mann Cup
1928	New Westminster Salmonbellies	-	-	-	-	-	-	-	no league play
1929	New Westminster Salmonbellies	8	6	2	0	48	25	12	
1930	New Westminster Salmonbellies	11	8	2	1	63	27	17	
1931	New Westminster Salmonbellies	14	11	1	2	91	41	24	
New Westminster Salmonbellies (Professional Field Lacrosse 1909-1924)
Season	Team	GP	W	L	T	GF	GA	PTS	PLAYOFFS
1909	New Westminster Salmonbellies	10	7	3	0	69	65	14	won Minto Cup
1910	New Westminster Salmonbellies	11	8	3	0	52	38	16	won Minto Cup
1911	New Westminster Salmonbellies	10	5	5	0	45	47	10	
1912	New Westminster Salmonbellies	16	12	4	0	77	58	24	won Minto Cup
1913	New Westminster Salmonbellies	7	5	2	0	47	32	10	won Minto Cup
1914	New Westminster Salmonbellies	6	3	3	0	36	33	6	won Minto Cup
1915	New Westminster Salmonbellies	11	7	4	0	91	68	14	won Minto Cup
1916	suspended operations	-	-	-	-	-	-	-	
1917	suspended operations	-	-	-	-	-	-	-	
1918	New Westminster Salmonbellies	8	2	6	0	50	61	4	
1919	New Westminster Salmonbellies	12	7	5	0	44	39	14	won Minto Cup
1920	New Westminster Salmonbellies	14	7	6	1	83	71	15	
1921	New Westminster Salmonbellies	18	10	8	0	117	103	20	won Minto Cup
1922	New Westminster Salmonbellies	16	9	7	0	70	84	18	won Minto Cup
1923	New Westminster Salmonbellies	15	8	7	0	84	69	16	won Minto Cup
1924	New Westminster Salmonbellies	4	2	1	1	22	12	5	won Minto Cup

=== All-time box lacrosse record ===
Season	Team name	Games	Win	Losses	Tie	GF	GA	Points	Playoffs
1932	New Westminster Salmonbellies	12	3	8	1	80	113	7	did not qualify
1933	New Westminster Salmonbellies	24	18	6	0	245	150	36	defeated in Mann Cup
1934	New Westminster Salmonbellies	24	14	10	0	356	295	28	defeated in Mann Cup
1935	New Westminster Salmonbellies	24	4	20	0	310	375	8	did not qualify
1936	New Westminster Salmonbellies	24	14	10	0	413	371	28	defeated in BC Provincial Finals
1937	New Westminster Salmonbellies	28	22	6	0	543	380	44	Won Mann Cup
1938	New Westminster Salmonbellies	24	15	9	0	421	378	30	defeated in ICLL Finals
1939	New Westminster Salmonbellies	24	13	11	0	441	432	26	defeated in ICLL Semi-Finals
1940	New Westminster Salmonbellies	24	7	17	0	408	419	14	did not qualify
1941	New Westminster Salmonbellies	24	7	17	0	360	404	14	did not qualify
1942	New Westminster Salmonbellies	23	15	8	0	269	227	30	defeated in Mann Cup
1943	New Westminster Salmonbellies	18	12	6	0	286	222	24	Won Mann Cup
1944	New Westminster Salmonbellies	24	18	5	1	380	256	37	defeated in Mann Cup
1945	New Westminster Salmonbellies	24	9	15	0	321	345	18	did not qualify
1946	New Westminster Salmonbellies	24	16	7	1	375	269	33	defeated in Mann Cup
1947	New Westminster Salmonbellies	24	11	12	1	343	366	23	defeated in ICLL Semi-Finals
1948	New Westminster Salmonbellies	24	9	15	0	297	316	18	did not qualify
1949	New Westminster Salmonbellies	16	6	10	0	178	213	12	did not qualify
1950	New Westminster Salmonbellies	30	12	17	1	384	451	25	did not qualify
1951	New Westminster Commandos	32	19	13	0	407	352	38	defeated in ICLL Semi-Finals
1952	New Westminster Salmonacs	32	19	13	0	447	366	38	defeated in ICLL Semi-Finals
1953	New Westminster Salmonacs	32	6	26	0	274	406	12	did not qualify
1954	New Westminster Royals	32	5	27	0	305	458	10	did not qualify
1955	New Westminster Salmonbellies	32	6	24	2	295	376	14	did not qualify
1956	New Westminster Salmonbellies	30	4	26	0	245	392	8	did not qualify
1957	New Westminster Salmonbellies	30	15	15	0	291	282	30	defeated in ICLL Semi-Finals
1958	New Westminster Salmonbellies	30	17	11	2	335	300	36	Won Mann Cup
1959	New Westminster O'Keefes	30	20	10	0	369	306	40	Won Mann Cup
1960	New Westminster O'Keefes	30	16	14	0	290	289	32	defeated in ICLL Semi-Finals
1961	New Westminster O'Keefes	30	25	4	1	356	246	51	defeated in ICLL Finals
1962	New Westminster O'Keefes	32	22	10	0	382	263	44	Won Mann Cup
1963	New Westminster O'Keefes	30	21	9	0	328	263	42	defeated in ICLL Finals
1964	New Westminster O'Keefes	32	18	13	1	336	298	37	defeated in ICLL Finals
1965	New Westminster O'Keefes	30	21	9	0	317	272	42	Won Mann Cup
1966	New Westminster Salmonbellies	30	13	15	2	271	311	28	defeated in ICLL Semi-Finals
1967	New Westminster Salmonbellies	30	13	17	0	284	329	26	did not qualify
1968	New Westminster Salmonbellies (NLA)	38	19	19	0	437	426	38	won NLA pro championship
1969	New Westminster Labatt Blues (Snr A)	18	17	1	0	306	107	34	defeated in Mann Cup
1969	New Westminster Salmonbellies (WLA Pro)	29	19	10	0	435	315	38	defeated in Canadian Pro championship
1970	New Westminster Salmonbellies	30	22	8	0	423	320	44	Won Mann Cup
1971	New Westminster Salmonbellies	31	22	9	0	384	295	44	defeated in Mann Cup
1972	New Westminster Salmonbellies	36	25	11	0	430	382	50	Won Mann Cup
1973	New Westminster Salmonbellies	25	7	18	0	317	384	14	did not qualify
1974	New Westminster Salmonbellies	24	20	3	1	337	264	41	Won Mann Cup
1975	New Westminster Salmonbellies	24	17	7	0	354	305	34	defeated in Semi-Finals
1976	New Westminster Salmonbellies	24	14	9	1	358	309	29	Won Mann Cup
1977	New Westminster Salmonbellies	24	12	12	0	307	289	24	defeated in Semi-Finals
1978	New Westminster Salmonbellies	24	12	11	1	346	351	25	defeated in Semi-Finals
1979	New Westminster Salmonbellies	30	17	12	1	396	370	35	defeated in Semi-Finals
1980	New Westminster Salmonbellies	24	11	13	0	314	306	22	defeated in Mann Cup
1981	New Westminster Salmonbellies	24	10	13	1	266	278	21	Won Mann Cup
1982	New Westminster Salmonbellies	24	17	7	0	296	239	34	defeated in Mann Cup
1983	New Westminster Salmonbellies	24	13	11	0	262	249	26	defeated in preliminary round-robin
1984	New Westminster Salmonbellies	24	16	8	0	287	248	32	defeated in Finals
1985	New Westminster Salmonbellies	24	11	13	0	226	214	22	defeated Mann Cup
1986	New Westminster Salmonbellies	24	14	10	0	225	199	28	Won Mann Cup
1987	New Westminster Salmonbellies	24	20	4	0	306	209	40	defeated in Mann Cup
1988	New Westminster Salmonbellies	24	16	8	0	224	209	32	defeated in Finals
1989	New Westminster Salmonbellies	24	21	3	0	282	192	42	Won Mann Cup
1990	New Westminster Salmonbellies	24	17	7	0	223	180	34	defeated in Semi-Finals
1991	New Westminster Salmonbellies	24	15	9	0	230	196	30	Won Mann Cup
1992	New Westminster Salmonbellies	24	17	7	0	255	181	34	defeated in Mann Cup
1993	New Westminster Salmonbellies	24	17	7	0	258	192	34	defeated in Semi-Finals
1994	New Westminster Salmonbellies	20	16	4	0	223	164	32	defeated in Mann Cup
1995	New Westminster Salmonbellies	25	21	2	2	274	186	44	defeated in Mann Cup
1996	New Westminster Salmonbellies	20	10	9	1	187	183	21	defeated in Semi-Finals
1997	New Westminster Salmonbellies	20	9	10	1	174	179	19	did not qualify
1998	New Westminster Salmonbellies	25	6	19	0	196	266	12	did not qualify
1999	New Westminster Salmonbellies	25	11	13	1	220	225	23	defeated in Semi-Finals
2000	New Westminster Salmonbellies	25	15	9	1	322	269	31	defeated in Semi-Finals
2001	New Westminster Salmonbellies	20	10	9	1	222	201	21	defeated in Semi-Finals
2002	New Westminster Salmonbellies	20	10	9	1	253	247	21	defeated in Semi-Finals
2003	New Westminster Salmonbellies	20	6	13	1	229	263	13	did not qualify
2004	New Westminster Salmonbellies	20	8	12	0	203	225	16	did not qualify
2005	New Westminster Salmonbellies	17	10	6	1	215	188	21	defeated in Semi-Finals
2006	New Westminster Salmonbellies	18	12	6	0	246	181	24	defeated in Finals
2007	New Westminster Salmonbellies	18	15	2	1	217	167	31	defeated in Finals
2008	New Westminster Salmonbellies	18	17	1	0	191	119	34	defeated in Mann Cup
2009	New Westminster Salmonbellies	18	13	3	2	180	141	28	defeated in Mann Cup
2010	New Westminster Salmonbellies	18	13	5	0	182	156	26	defeated in Mann Cup
2011	New Westminster Salmonbellies	18	11	5	2	165	137	24	defeated in Finals
2012	New Westminster Salmonbellies	18	9	9	0	158	162	18	did not qualify
2013	New Westminster Salmonbellies	18	7	10	1	167	178	15	did not qualify
2014	New Westminster Salmonbellies	18	9	9	0	156	149	18	defeated in Semi-Finals
2015	New Westminster Salmonbellies	18	12	6	0	158	144	24	defeated in Finals
2016	New Westminster Salmonbellies	18	12	4	2	179	143	26	defeated in Semi-Finals
2017	New Westminster Salmonbellies	18	11	6	1	187	148	23	defeated in Mann Cup
2018	New Westminster Salmonbellies	18	15	3	0	225	158	30	defeated in Semi-Finals
2019	New Westminster Salmonbellies	18	11	7	0	202	155	22	defeated in Semi-Finals
2020	Season cancelled								
2021	Season cancelled								
2022	New Westminster Salmonbellies	18	9	9	0	165	172	18	did not qualify
2023	New Westminster Salmonbellies	18	15	3	0	206	146	30	defeated in Mann Cup
2024	New Westminster Salmonbellies	18	8	10	0	191	186	16	defeated in Semi-Finals
2025	New Westminster Salmonbellies	18	14	4	0	189	142	28	defeated in Mann Cup
2026	New Westminster Salmonbellies	18	6	12	0	129	157	12	did not qualify
