= Western Lacrosse Association =

Senior A box lacrosse league in British Columbia, Canada

- Current season, competition or edition: 2025
- Western Lacrosse Association
- Sport: Box lacrosse
- Founded: 1932
- Commissioner: Paul Dal Monte
- No. of teams: 7
- Country: Canada
- Most recent champion: Coquitlam Adanacs (2026)
- Most titles: New Westminster Salmonbellies (22 titles)
- Website: WLAlacrosse.com

The Western Lacrosse Association (WLA) is a men's Senior A box lacrosse league with seven teams in British Columbia. The playoff championship team each season advances to the play against the Major Series Lacrosse champions for the Mann Cup. The championship is hosted alternately between Ontario and British Columbia each year.

== The teams ==
The league consists of the following teams:

Team
Burnaby Lakers
Coquitlam Adanacs
Langley Thunder
Maple Ridge Burrards
Nanaimo Timbermen
New Westminster Salmonbellies
Victoria Shamrocks

== League history ==
- Box lacrosse adopted by British Columbia Amateur Lacrosse Association on May 4, 1932
- 1932-1933: Senior Box Lacrosse League (under BCALA umbrella)
- 1934-1967: Inter-City Lacrosse League (ICLL)
- 1968: National Lacrosse Association (Western Division)
- 1969–present: Western Lacrosse Association

=== Trophies and awards ===
League championship trophies:

- Kilmarnock Trophy (1910–1970)
- Commission Rose Bowl (1971–2008)
- Ted Fridge Memorial Trophy (2008–present)

Regular season top-record trophies:

- CKNW "TOP DOG" TROPHY (1952–2008)
- Stan Shillington Trophy (2009–present)

== League champions ==
Teams in bold = Mann Cup winner

Statistics prior to 2005 by reference of the Canadian Lacrosse Almanac.

| Season | Champion | Runner-up | Series | Ref. |
|---|---|---|---|---|
| 1969 | New Westminster Labatt Blues | Surrey Turf Hotel Riders | 3-0 | |
| 1970 | **New Westminster Salmonbellies** | Coquitlam Adanacs | 4-2 | |
| 1971 | New Westminster Salmonbellies | Coquitlam Adanacs | 4-2 | |
| 1972 | **New Westminster Salmonbellies** | Vancouver Burrards | 4-3 | |
| 1973 | Vancouver Burrards | Coquitlam Adanacs | 4-2 | |
| 1974 | **New Westminster Salmonbellies** | Vancouver Burrards | 3-0 | |
| 1975 | **Vancouver Burrards** | Victoria Shamrocks | 4-1 | |
| 1976 | **New Westminster Salmonbellies** | Vancouver Burrards | 4-2 | |
| 1977 | **Vancouver Burrards** | Victoria Shamrocks | 4-3 | |
| 1978 | Victoria Shamrocks | Coquitlam Adanacs | 4-0 | |
| 1979 | **Victoria Shamrocks** | Coquitlam Adanacs | 4-1 | |
| 1980 | New Westminster Salmonbellies | Victoria Shamrocks | 4-2 | |
| 1981 | **New Westminster Salmonbellies** | Coquitlam Adanacs | 4-1 | |
| 1982 | New Westminster Salmonbellies | Coquitlam Adanacs | 4-1 | |
| 1983 | **Victoria Payless** | Vancouver Burrards | 4-2 | |
| 1984 | Victoria Payless | New Westminster Salmonbellies | 4-0 | |
| 1985 | New Westminster Salmonbellies | Victoria Payless | 4-3 | |
| 1986 | **New Westminster Salmonbellies** | Victoria Payless | 4-1 | |
| 1987 | New Westminster Salmonbellies | Coquitlam Adanacs | 4-2 | |
| 1988 | Coquitlam Adanacs | New Westminster Salmonbellies | 4-3 | |
| 1989 | **New Westminster Salmonbellies** | Coquitlam Adanacs | 4-0 | |
| 1990 | Vancouver Burrards | Burnaby Lakers | 4-2 | |
| 1991 | **New Westminster Salmonbellies** | Coquitlam Adanacs | 4-3 | |
| 1992 | New Westminster Salmonbellies | Burnaby Lakers | 4-1 | |
| 1993 | Coquitlam Adanacs | Burnaby Lakers | 4-3 | |
| 1994 | New Westminster Salmonbellies | Coquitlam Adanacs | 4-1 | |
| 1995 | New Westminster Salmonbellies | Victoria Shamrocks | 4-0 | |
| 1996 | Victoria Shamrocks | North Shore Indians | 4-0 | |
| 1997 | **Victoria Shamrocks** | North Shore Indians | 4-1 | |
| 1998 | Coquitlam Adanacs | Victoria Shamrocks | 4-2 | |
| 1999 | **Victoria Shamrocks** | Coquitlam Adanacs | 4-1 | |
| 2000 | Victoria Shamrocks | Coquitlam Adanacs | 4-1 | |
| 2001 | **Coquitlam Adanacs** | Victoria Shamrocks | 4-2 | |
| 2002 | Victoria Shamrocks | Coquitlam Adanacs | 4-2 | |
| 2003 | **Victoria Shamrocks** | Coquitlam Adanacs | 4-1 | |
| 2004 | Victoria Shamrocks | Burnaby Lakers | 4-1 | |
| 2005 | **Victoria Shamrocks** | Coquitlam Adanacs | 4–1 | |
| 2006 | Victoria Shamrocks | New Westminster Salmonbellies | 4–1 | |
| 2007 | Coquitlam Adanacs | New Westminster Salmonbellies | 4–0 | |
| 2008 | New Westminster Salmonbellies | Coquitlam Adanacs | 4–0 | |
| 2009 | New Westminster Salmonbellies | Coquitlam Adanacs | 4–0 | |
| 2010 | New Westminster Salmonbellies | Victoria Shamrocks | 4–0 | |
| 2011 | Langley Thunder | New Westminster Salmonbellies | 4–2 | |
| 2012 | Langley Thunder | Coquitlam Adanacs | 4–7 | |
| 2013 | Victoria Shamrocks | Langley Thunder | 4–2 | |
| 2014 | Victoria Shamrocks | Maple Ridge Burrards | 4–1 | |
| 2015 | **Victoria Shamrocks** | New Westminster Salmonbellies | 4–0 | |
| 2016 | Maple Ridge Burrards | Victoria Shamrocks | 4–2 | |
| 2017 | New Westminster Salmonbellies | Victoria Shamrocks | 4–1 | |
| 2018 | Maple Ridge Burrards | Victoria Shamrocks | 4–1 | |
| 2019 | Victoria Shamrocks | Maple Ridge Burrards | 4–1 | |
| 2020 | no season (COVID-19 pandemic) | | | |
| 2021 | no season (COVID-19 pandemic) | | | |
| 2022 | Langley Thunder | Nanaimo Timbermen | 4–1 | |
| 2023 | New Westminster Salmonbellies | Langley Thunder | 4–3 | |
| 2024 | Victoria Shamrocks | Langley Thunder | 4–0 | |
| 2025 | New Westminster Salmonbellies | Coquitlam Adanacs | 4–1 | |
| 2026 | Coquitlam Adanacs | Victoria Shamrocks | 4-2 | |

== Current team history ==
New Westminster Salmonbellies

- 1888–1931 founded on May 12, 1888; played as field lacrosse club
- 1932–1950 New Westminster Salmonbellies (merged with New Westminster Adanacs)
- 1951–1951 New Westminster Commandos
- 1952–1953 New Westminster Salmonacs
- 1954–1954 New Westminster Royals
- 1955–1958 New Westminster Salmonbellies
- 1959–1965 New Westminster O'Keefes
- 1966–present New Westminster Salmonbellies

Maple Ridge Burrards

- 1937–1937 Vancouver Burrard Olympics
- 1938–1949 Vancouver Burrards
- 1950–1950 Vancouver Burrard Westerns (merged with Richmond Farmers)
- 1951–1951 Vancouver Combines
- 1952–1958 Vancouver Pilseners
- 1959–1969 Vancouver Carlings
- 1970–1993 Vancouver Burrards (transferred to Surrey)
- 1994–1995 Surrey Burrards (transferred to Maple Ridge)
- 1996–present Maple Ridge Burrards

Victoria Shamrocks

- 1950–1982 Victoria Shamrocks
- 1983–1993 Victoria Payless
- 1994–present Victoria Shamrocks

Coquitlam Adanacs

- 1965–1967 Coquitlam Adanacs (transferred to Portland)
- 1968–1968 Portland Adanacs (transferred to Coquitlam)
- 1969–present Coquitlam Adanacs

Burnaby Lakers

- 1986–1989 Richmond Outlaws (transferred to Burnaby)
- 1990–present Burnaby Lakers

Langley Thunder

- 1994–1999 North Shore Indians (transferred to Kelowna)
- 2000–2001 Okanagan Thunder (transferred to North Vancouver)
- 2002–2003 North Shore Thunder (transferred to Langley)
- 2004–present Langley Thunder

Nanaimo Timbermen

- 2005–present Nanaimo Timbermen

== Defunct teams ==
the Indians

- 1932–1932 North Vancouver Squamish Indians
- 1935–1941 North Shore Indians (suspended operations during World War II)
- 1945–1945 Indian Arrows
- 1946–1951 North Shore Indians
- 1952–1954 PNE Indians
- 1955–1955 Mount Pleasant Indians (merged with Vancouver Pilseners)

Vancouver Athletic Club / Abbotsford Hotel

- 1932–1932 Vancouver Athletic Club (renamed Abbotsford Hotel)
- 1933–1933 Vancouver Abbotsford Hotel

New Westminster Adanacs

- 1933–1941 New Westminster Adanacs (suspended operations during World War II)
- 1945–1950 New Westminster Adanacs (merged with New Westminster Salmonbellies)

Richmond Farmers

- 1933–1934 Vancouver St. Helen's Hotel (transferred to Richmond)
- 1935–1936 Richmond Farmers (merged with Vancouver Home Gas)
- 1937–1937 Richmond-Homes Combines
- 1938–1941 Richmond Farmers
- 1942–1942 Burrard Drydock 'Wallaces United'
- 1943–1949 Richmond Farmers (transferred to Vancouver-Kerrisdale)
- 1950–1950 Richmond-Kerrisdale 'Arkays' (merged with Vancouver Burrard Westerns)

Vancouver Bluebirds / Home Gas

- 1934–1935 Vancouver Province Bluebirds
- 1936–1936 Vancouver Home Gas (merged with Richmond Farmers)

"Norvans"

- 1942–1942 North Vancouver Ship Repair Yard 'Norvans'

Military teams

- 1943–1944 Vancouver Army
- 1944–1944 Vancouver HMCS Discovery Navy

Nanaimo

- 1951–1954 Nanaimo Native Sons
- 1955–1958 Nanaimo Timbermen
- 1959–1964 Nanaimo Labatts
- 1975–1981 Nanaimo Timbermen

Burnaby

- 1962–1962 Burnaby Norburns

== See also ==
- Lacrosse
- Box lacrosse
- British Columbia Lacrosse Association
- Major Series Lacrosse
- Ontario Lacrosse Association
