= Ian Llord =

Canadian lacrosse player (born 1985)

Personal information
- Nickname: Llord of the Rings
- Born: June 9, 1985 (age 41) St. Catharines, Ontario, Canada
- Height: 6 ft 3 in (191 cm)
- Weight: 220 lb (100 kg; 15 st 10 lb)

Sport
- Position: Defence
- NLL draft: 5th overall, 2006; Philadelphia Wings
- NLL team Former teams: Rochester Knighthawks; Philadelphia Wings; Colorado Mammoth; Rochester Knighthawks; Buffalo Bandits; Philadelphia Wings
- MSL team Former teams: Peterborough Lakers; Brampton Excelsiors; Victoria Shamrocks
- Pro career: 2007–

Ian Llord (born June 9, 1985, in St. Catharines, Ontario) is a Canadian professional box lacrosse player who plays for the Philadelphia Wings of the National Lacrosse League and the Six Nations Chiefs of Major Series Lacrosse.

== Canadian box career ==
=== Junior ===
Llord played for the St. Catharines Athletics of the Ontario Junior A Lacrosse League. In 2003, he would help the team to their second Minto Cup in three years.

=== Senior ===
Llord was selected 1st Overall in the 2007 Major Series Lacrosse draft by the Brampton Excelsiors. During his rookie season, the Excelsiors won the Mann Cup.

In 2013, Llord split time between the Six Nations Chiefs of Major Series Lacrosse and the St. Catharines Saints of the Ontario Lacrosse Association Senior B Lacrosse League. He appeared in both regular season and playoff games for both teams. The Chiefs won the Mann Cup, and the Saints won the Presidents Cup.

== National Lacrosse League career ==
Llord was originally drafted by the Bandits in the fourth round (42nd overall) of the 2005 NLL Entry Draft. Unsigned by the Bandits, Llord would re-enter the Draft the following year where he was taken in the first round draft (5th overall) by the Philadelphia Wings. He was awarded Rookie of the Week honours in Week 7 of the 2007 season.

Following the 2007 season, Llord was traded to the Calgary Roughnecks in a three-way trade. Llord was then traded to the Buffalo Bandits during the 2007 NLL Entry Draft.

Llord was a member of the 2008 NLL Champion Buffalo Bandits, 2013 and 2014 NLL Champion Rochester Knighthawks.

== Statistics ==
=== National Lacrosse League ===
Ian Llord		Regular season									Playoffs								
Season	Team	GP	G	A	Pts	LB	PIM	Pts/GP	LB/GP	PIM/GP	GP	G	A	Pts	LB	PIM	Pts/GP	LB/GP	PIM/GP
2007	Philadelphia Wings	11	2	6	8	49	18	0.73	4.45	1.64	–	–	–	–	–	–	–	–	–
2008	Buffalo Bandits	15	5	12	17	71	26	1.13	4.73	1.73	3	0	1	1	10	23	0.33	3.33	7.67
2009	Buffalo Bandits	14	1	6	7	50	23	0.50	3.57	1.64	2	0	0	0	8	11	0.00	4.00	5.50
2010	Buffalo Bandits	12	1	7	8	44	53	0.67	3.67	4.42	1	0	0	0	1	0	0.00	1.00	0.00
2011	Buffalo Bandits	10	0	1	1	32	4	0.10	3.20	0.40	2	0	0	0	6	6	0.00	3.00	3.00
2012	Buffalo Bandits	14	1	4	5	36	12	0.36	2.57	0.86	1	0	1	1	2	0	1.00	2.00	0.00
2013	Rochester Knighthawks	14	1	2	3	42	34	0.21	3.00	2.43	3	0	0	0	4	0	0.00	1.33	0.00
2014	Rochester Knighthawks	16	0	1	1	33	19	0.06	2.06	1.19	6	0	2	2	7	4	0.33	1.17	0.67
2015	Rochester Knighthawks	17	1	5	6	59	38	0.35	3.47	2.24	4	0	0	0	9	4	0.00	2.25	1.00
2016	Rochester Knighthawks	17	1	1	2	60	8	0.12	3.53	0.47	–	–	–	–	–	–	–	–	–
2017	Rochester Knighthawks	18	4	3	7	78	16	0.39	4.33	0.89	–	–	–	–	–	–	–	–	–
2018	Rochester Knighthawks	18	2	4	6	71	31	0.33	3.94	1.72	4	0	2	2	12	0	0.50	3.00	0.00
2019	Rochester Knighthawks	9	0	0	0	24	8	0.00	2.67	0.89	–	–	–	–	–	–	–	–	–
2019	Colorado Mammoth	6	0	1	1	21	4	0.17	3.50	0.67	2	0	0	0	4	2	0.00	2.00	1.00
2020	Philadelphia Wings	12	0	1	1	20	18	0.08	1.67	1.50	–	–	–	–	–	–	–	–	–
2022	Philadelphia Wings	15	2	0	2	37	20	0.13	2.47	1.33	1	0	0	0	2	2	0.00	2.00	2.00
2023	Philadelphia Wings	13	0	2	2	31	13	0.15	2.38	1.00	–	–	–	–	–	–	–	–	–
2024	Philadelphia Wings	18	0	3	3	55	22	0.17	3.06	1.22	–	–	–	–	–	–	–	–	–
		249	21	59	80	813	367	0.32	3.27	1.47	29	0	6	6	65	52	0.21	2.24	1.79
Career Total:		278	21	65	86	878	419	0.31	3.16	1.51									

GP–Games played; G–Goals; A–Assists; Pts–Points; LB–Loose balls; PIM–Penalty minutes; Pts/GP–Points per games played; LB/GP–Loose balls per games played; PIM/GP–Penalty minutes per games played.

=== Canadian Lacrosse Association ===
Ian Llord - Junior "B"			Regular Season							Playoffs						
Season	Team	League	GP	G	A	Pts	PIM	Pts/GP	PIM/GP	GP	G	A	Pts	PIM	Pts/GP	PIM/GP
2002	St. Catharines Spartans	OLA JR B	16	13	11	24	112	1.50	7.00	11	8	9	17	67	1.55	6.09
			16	13	11	24	112	1.50	7.00	11	8	9	17	67	1.55	6.09
Junior "B" Career Total:			27	21	20	41	179	1.52	6.63							

Ian Llord - Junior "A"			Regular Season							Playoffs						
Season	Team	League	GP	G	A	Pts	PIM	Pts/GP	PIM/GP	GP	G	A	Pts	PIM	Pts/GP	PIM/GP
2002	St. Catharines Athletics	OLA JR A	2	0	0	0	0	0.00	0.00	–	–	–	–	–	–	–
2003	St. Catharines Athletics	OLA JR A	14	1	6	7	49	0.50	3.50	12	1	3	4	28	0.33	2.33
2004	St. Catharines Athletics	OLA JR A	15	4	6	10	98	0.67	6.53	5	1	2	3	12	0.60	2.40
2005	St. Catharines Athletics	OLA JR A	5	3	4	7	8	1.40	1.60	–	–	–	–	–	–	–
2006	St. Catharines Athletics	OLA JR A	22	5	8	13	91	0.59	4.14	6	0	4	4	8	0.67	1.33
			58	13	24	37	246	0.64	4.24	23	2	9	11	48	0.48	2.09
Junior "A" Career Total:			81	15	33	48	294	0.59	3.63							

Ian Llord - Senior "B"			Regular Season							Playoffs						
Season	Team	League	GP	G	A	Pts	PIM	Pts/GP	PIM/GP	GP	G	A	Pts	PIM	Pts/GP	PIM/GP
2013	St. Catharines Saints	OLA SR B	6	0	2	2	27	0.33	4.50	12	1	8	9	58	0.75	4.83
			6	0	2	2	27	0.33	4.50	12	1	8	9	58	0.75	4.83
Senior "B" Career Total:			18	1	10	11	85	0.61	4.72							

Ian Llord - Senior "A"			Regular Season							Playoffs						
Season	Team	League	GP	G	A	Pts	PIM	Pts/GP	PIM/GP	GP	G	A	Pts	PIM	Pts/GP	PIM/GP
2008	Brampton Excelsiors	MSL	16	0	4	4	19	0.25	1.19	12	0	1	1	6	0.08	0.50
2009	Victoria Shamrocks	WLA	18	0	11	11	14	0.61	0.78	5	0	2	2	8	0.40	1.60
2010	Victoria Shamrocks	WLA	14	0	0	0	41	0.00	2.93	10	0	3	3	14	0.30	1.40
2011	Six Nations Chiefs	MSL	10	0	2	2	10	0.20	1.00	9	0	1	1	12	0.11	1.33
2013	Six Nations Chiefs	MSL	6	0	1	1	7	0.17	1.17	9	1	1	2	14	0.22	1.56
			64	0	18	18	91	0.28	1.42	45	1	8	9	54	0.20	1.20
Senior "A" Career Total:			109	1	26	27	145	0.25	1.33							

GP–Games played; G–Goals; A–Assists; Pts–Points; PIM–Penalty minutes; Pts/GP–Points per game; PIM/GP–Penalty minutes per game
