= Don Hamilton (lacrosse) =

Canadian lacrosse player (born 1937)

Don "Mr. Nice Guy" Hamilton
Personal information
- Nickname: Hammy Hambone
- Nationality: Canadian
- Born: February 18, 1937 (age 89) Vancouver, British Columbia, Canada

Sport
- Position: Goaltender
- WLA/ NLA team: Victoria Shamrocks (ICLL); Vancouver Burrards (WLA); Vancouver Burrards (NLA)
- Pro career: 1956–1976

Career highlights
- Mann Cup: 1961, 1975, 1977 (GM); Nicholson Trophy: 1969, 1970, 1971

Donald "Mr. Nice Guy" Brian Rickerby Hamilton (born February 18, 1937) is a Canadian retired professional and amateur box lacrosse goaltender and a professional ice hockey goaltender. Hamilton was considered an elite goaltender in his time and is a member of the Canadian Lacrosse Hall of Fame. He is remembered as the only goaltender to have completed a shutout in a Mann Cup national championship game.

== Career ==
Hamilton became a goaltender at the age of 12 because of an asthma condition. Hamilton joined the Western Lacrosse Association's Victoria Shamrocks in 1956 as a fill-in for injured starter Geordie Johnston. He would back-up Johnston for the next two seasons while leading his Jr. Shamrocks team to two consecutive Minto Cup finals. From 1955 until 1958, Hamilton tended goal in the Western Hockey League for the Seattle Americans and the Victoria Cougars.

In 1960, Hamilton moved to Vancouver and joined the Vancouver Burrards. On September 23, 1961, Hamilton would become the first and only goaltender during the box lacrosse era to record a shutout in Mann Cup play, blanking the Brampton Ramblers 13–0. In 1962, at the height of his career, Hamilton was forced to step away from lacrosse when work forced him to move to Kamloops, British Columbia. While there, he founded their Senior B team and their minor lacrosse association while acting as its first president. In 1968, Hamilton rejoined the Burrards and turned professional with the National Lacrosse Association. This lasted for two seasons.

Don Hamilton retired from lacrosse with the Burrards in 1976 after winning two Mann Cups in three attempts during his career. Hamilton returned as general manager in 1977, and won another Mann Cup. Hamilton was the Western Manager of Team Canada at the World Lacrosse Championships in 1982.

== Honours ==
Hamilton was inducted into the Canadian Lacrosse Hall of Fame in 1990.

== Statistics ==
Source: Wamper's Bible of Lacrosse and Stan Shillington's "Who's Who in Lacrosse 1933-2013: Goaltending Records".

Season	Team	League	GP	G	A	P	PIM	Sv%	Team GAA
1956	Victoria	ICLL	20	0	3	3	0	0.726	11.13
1957	Victoria	ICLL	5	0	1	1	0	0.729	9.83
1958	Victoria	ICLL	5	0	0	0	0	0.724	10.10
1959	Victoria	ICLL	6	0	0	0	0	0.699	13.27
-	Victoria	P/O	1	0	0	0	0	0.625	-
1960	Vancouver	ICLL	12	0	1	1	0	0.700	8.27
-	Vancouver	P/O	2	0	0	0	0	0.706	-
1961	Vancouver	ICLL	27	0	2	2	0	0.743	8.53
-	Vancouver	P/O	6	0	0	0	0	0.815	-
1962	Vancouver	ICLL	1	0	0	0	0	0.718	6.94
1963-67	Played Senior B								
1968	Vancouver	NLA	17	0	11	11	0	0.746	10.24
-	Vancouver	P/O	7	0	4	4	0	0.800	-
1969	Vancouver	NLA	29	0	25	25	0	0.769	12.72
-	Vancouver	P/O	4	0	11	11	0	0.738	-
1970	Vancouver	WLA	29	0	45	45	2	0.764	11.77
-	Vancouver	P/O	4	0	4	4	5	0.744	-
1971	Vancouver	WLA	27	0	22	22	0	0.735	12.77
-	Vancouver	P/O	3	0	0	0	0	0.724	-
1972	Vancouver	WLA	20	0	25	25	0	0.756	11.19
-	Vancouver	P/O	5	0	3	3	0	0.753	-
1973	Vancouver	WLA	24	0	11	11	0	0.759	11.28
-	Vancouver	P/O	5	0	2	2	0	0.738	-
1974	Vancouver	WLA	20	0	13	13	2	0.776	12.13
-	Vancouver	P/O	8	0	9	9	0	0.764	-
1975	Vancouver	WLA	23	0	8	8	0	0.754	12.83
-	Vancouver	P/O	10	1	4	5	0	0.773	-
1976	Vancouver	WLA	5	0	4	4	0	0.713	13.71
-	Vancouver	P/O	4	0	0	0	0	0.659	-
