= Mike Poulin =

Canadian lacrosse player

Personal information
- Nickname: Poulin Wall
- Nationality: Canadian; Czech
- Born: December 17, 1985 (age 40) Kitchener, Ontario, Canada
- Height: 6 ft 2 in (188 cm)
- Weight: 205 lb (93 kg; 14 st 9 lb)

Sport
- Position: Goaltender
- Shoots: Right
- NLL team Former teams: San Diego Seals (2024-2025); Toronto Rock (2007-08); Boston Blazers (2009-10); Calgary Roughnecks (2010-16); Georgia Swarm (2016-2022)
- MSL team Former teams: Brooklin Redmen; Kitchener-Waterloo Kodiaks; Six Nations Chiefs
- Pro career: 2007–

Mike Poulin (born December 17, 1985, in Kitchener, Ontario) is a Czech Canadian professional box lacrosse goaltender who played for the San Diego Seals of the National Lacrosse League (NLL). He formerly played for the Georgia Swarm, Calgary Roughnecks, the Toronto Rock and the Boston Blazers. He also plays for the Brooklin Redmen and formerly played with Kitchener-Waterloo Kodiaks and Six Nations Chiefs of Major Series Lacrosse (MSL).

Poulin was awarded the Goaltender of the Year Award in the 2012 NLL season. In the 2014 NLL season, he passed Curtis Palidwor to become the all-time Roughneck leader in minutes played with 3,946.

Poulin has played twice at the World Indoor Lacrosse Championship: He represented the Czech Republic in 2015 and Canada in 2019.

== Awards ==
Preceded by Matt Vinc	NLL Goaltender of the Year; 2012	Succeeded by Matt Vinc
