= St. Catharines Athletics (MSL) =

St. Catharines Athletics
City	St. Catharines, Ontario
League	Major Series Lacrosse
Founded	1877
Home Arena(s)	Bill Burgoyne Arena; Garden City Arena; Haig Bowl
Colours	Navy Blue, Royal Blue and White
Coach
GM

The St. Catharines Athletics are a defunct Senior "A" box lacrosse team from St. Catharines, Ontario, Canada.

== History ==
Name History
Name	Years
St. Catharines Athletics	1877 - 1924
No Team	1925 - 1927
St. Catharines Athletics	1928 - 1929
No Team	1930 - 1932
St. Catharines Athletics	1933 - 1957
Welland Switsons	1958 - 1959
St. Catharines Athletics	1960 - 1966
No Team	1967 - 1983
St. Catharines Merchant Athletics	1984 - 1985
No Team	1986 - 1998
St. Catharines Athletics	1999 - 2005
Kitchener-Waterloo Kodiaks	2006 - 2015
Cobourg Kodiaks	2016–Present

== Championships ==
Canadian Lacrosse Association: 1889 - 1890, 1905, 1907 - 1910
Senior "A" League Titles: 1938 - 1941, 1944 - 1946
Mann Cups: 1938, 1940, 1941, 1944, 1946

== See also ==
- Bob McCready
- St. Catharines Athletics Jr. A
