= Major Series Lacrosse =

Lacrosse league

- Major Series Lacrosse
- Sport: Box lacrosse
- Founded: 1887
- No. of teams: 7
- Country: Canada
- Most recent champion: Six Nations Chiefs (2026)
- Website: majorserieslacrosse.ca

Major Series Lacrosse (MSL) is a Senior A box lacrosse league with 7 teams based in Ontario, Canada, sanctioned by the Ontario Lacrosse Association. The league championship team each year goes on to play against the champions of the Western Lacrosse Association for the Mann Cup in September. The championship is hosted alternately between Ontario and British Columbia.

== History ==
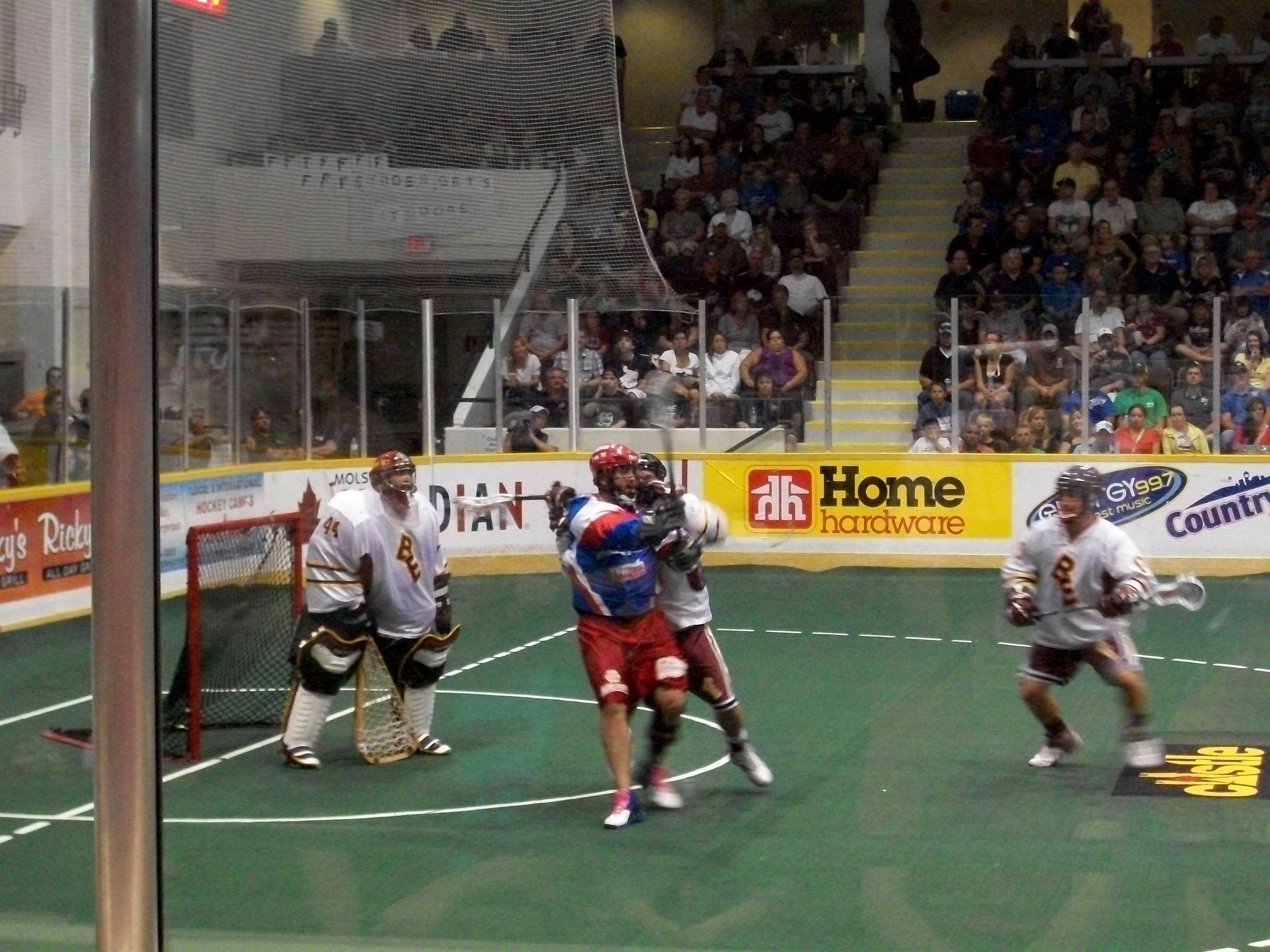
MSL Playoffs: Brampton Excelsiors vs. Peterborough Lakers (2011).

=== Field Era ===
Major Series Lacrosse originated in the late 19th century as the Canadian Lacrosse Association. In its early days, it had competition from the semi-professional National Lacrosse Union that ran from around 1880 until around 1920 with teams in the Toronto, Ottawa, and Montreal markets. In the early 20th century the CLA had another rival league, the Dominion Lacrosse Association in much of the same markets as the NLU. In these early days, all lacrosse was field lacrosse. Early powerhouses in the league were the Orangeville Dufferins (1890s) and the St. Catharines Athletics (1900s and 1910s).

In 1913, the CLA became the Ontario Amateur Lacrosse Association. The league had a Western Division with teams in Toronto and the Golden Horseshoe and an Eastern Division with teams in the Ottawa District, but a year later the Ottawa teams left the league. In 1920, the NLU had dropped to 3 teams and elected to disband. The OALA was left as the only Senior A league in Ontario and only had to face the Ontario Intermediate A champion for a berth into the Mann Cup National Senior championships.

In 1926, an OALA team won its first Mann Cup. Until this point, the Mann Cup was a challenge trophy, mostly dominated by British Columbia's New Westminster Salmonbellies, in 1926 the entire country could compete for the trophy in a playdown style. As standings leaders of the OALA at midpoint, the Weston Westonmen were awarded the right to represent the OALA for the Mann Cup. The Westonmen were met by the Winnipeg Tigers, whom they defeated 11-3 to become the first Mann Cup champion of the playdown era. The Westonmen were then forced to face the Brampton Excelsiors in the Ontario final who beat them 10-goals-to-6 in a two-game series. The Westonmen would dominate the Ontario scene in the 1920s with 5 league titles and the 1926 Mann Cup. In 1931, the Excelsiors defeated the Toronto Native Sons 2-games-to-1 to win the OALA championship. The Excelsiors would go on to defeat New Westminster in the Mann Cup final 2-games-to-1. This marked the end of Field Lacrosse for this league and the last Mann Cup to ever be conducted on a field.

=== Indoor Era ===
The Mimico Mountaineers would defeat the Fergus Thistles 2-games-to-1 to become the first Ontario Senior A box lacrosse champions. They would later host the Winnipeg Argos at Maple Leaf Gardens and win the first ever indoor Mann Cup 2-games-to-none.

The Orillia Terriers would be the most dominant OALA team in the 1930s, winning four straight OALA title (1934–1937) and three consecutive Mann Cup (1934–1936) becoming the first team of the Indoor Era to accomplish that streak.

In 1939, the league became the Ontario Lacrosse Association Senior A League (OLA).

The St. Catharines Athletics found their stride in 1938 and would win the OLA seven times in nine seasons (losing 1942 and 1943 to Brampton). The Athletics would be National Champions five times in that span, beating the New Westminster Adanacs 3-games-to-none in 1938, the Vancouver Burrards 3-games-to-1 in 1940, the Richmond Farmers 3-games-to-2 in 1941, the New Westminster Salmonbellies 3-games-to-2 in 1944 and the 'Bellies again in 1946 3-games-to-none.

In 1951, the core of the 1950 Mann Cup winning Owen Sound Crescents, including star goalie Lloyd "Moon" Wootton transferred to the Peterborough Trailermen. The move would lead to one of the biggest dynasties ever in lacrosse, including 8 OLA championships in 9 years, 4 Mann Cups, and an infamous standoff with the Canadian Lacrosse Association that left the entire team suspended for five years. From 1951 until 1957, the Trailermen won 7 straight OLA League titles and the first four years they won the Mann Cup, becoming the first indoor team to win four years straight. In 1951, the Trailermen defeated the Vancouver Combines 4-games-to-3 to win their first Mann Cup, then beat Vancouver (Burrards) again in 1952 4-games-to-none to win it again. In 1953 and 1954, the Trailermen defeated the Victoria Shamrocks 4-games-to-1 and 4-games-straight respectively to cap off the four cup run. Victoria would return the favour in 1955, beating the Trailermen in 5 games, and the Nanaimo Timbermen would do the same in 1956. The Trailermen would win their league again in 1957, but controversy ensued at the Mann Cup. Peterborough's star scorer Bob Allan left a BC team without receiving a release to come play for the Trailermen. Although the OLA ruled him eligible, when the team arrived in BC to play the Mann Cup, the CLA barred him from playing. Peterborough refused to take the floor for the first game without Allan and the CLA kicked them out of the playoffs and suspended every player on the team for five seasons. The Trailermen were replaced by a rusty Long Branch Pontiacs squad that were easily swept by Victoria. The Trailermen players sat out their suspension in 1958, but their suspensions were commuted in time for the 1959 season. Peterborough would win yet another league title in 1959, but could not muster any past success in the Mann Cup final. The dynasty had ended and Peterborough did not make another final for six seasons.

== Teams ==
Team	Joined	Centre	Mann Cups
Brampton Excelsiors	c. 1887	Brampton	11
Brooklin Lacrosse Club	1961	Brooklin	7
Cobourg Kodiaks	2016	Cobourg	0
Oakville Rock	2010	Oakville	0
Owen Sound North Stars	2001	Owen Sound	0
Peterborough Lakers	1949	Peterborough	18
Six Nations Chiefs	1993	Hagersville	10

== All-Star Game ==
During the 2012 MSL Entry Draft, the league announced it would be holding its first ever All-Star Game. Peterborough was set to host, citing average attendance as the driving factor. However, in April that same year, the game was cancelled due to two major issues. The first was concern of unnecessary risk of injury and the other was the distribution of revenue.

== Champions ==
Year	Champion	Finalist	Series
Field Lacrosse Era
1887	Toronto
1888	Paris Brants
1889	St. Catharines Athletics
1890	St. Catharines Athletics
1891	Niagara Falls
1892	Stratford
1893	Stratford
1894	Stratford
1895	Seaforth
1896	Toronto Tecumseh
1897	Toronto Tecumseh
1898	Orangeville Dufferins
1899	Orangeville Dufferins
1900	Orangeville Dufferins	Toronto Tecumsehs	8-0 (2 gm)
1901	Orangeville Dufferins	St. Catharines Athletics	7-5 (1 gm)
1902	Brantford L.C.	Woodstock Beavers	15-3 (2 gm)
1903	Brantford L.C.	St. Catharines Athletics	12-2-0
1904	Brantford L.C.	Toronto Tecumsehs	10-4-2
1905	St. Catharines Athletics	Toronto Tecumsehs	14-2-0
1906
1907	St. Catharines Athletics	Hamilton Tigers	12-0-0
1908	St. Catharines Athletics	Hamilton Tigers	6-0-0
1909	St. Catharines Athletics
1910	St. Catharines Athletics	Toronto Tecumsehs	5-2-0
1911	St. Catharines Athletics	Toronto Junction Shamrocks	7-0-0
1912	St. Catharines Athletics	Toronto Eatons	5-1-1
1913	Brampton Excelsiors	Almonte L.C.	38-4 (2 gm)
1914	Brampton Excelsiors	Ottawa Shamrocks	19-1 (1 gm)
1915	Toronto Young Torontos	St. Catharines Athletics	2-0-0
1916	Toronto Young Torontos	St. Catharines Athletics	4-0-0
1917	Toronto Young Torontos
1918	Toronto Maitlands	St. Catharines Athletics	11-10 (2 gm)
1919	Toronto St. Simon's	Brampton Excelsiors	Default
1920	Toronto St. Simon's	Brampton Excelsiors	8-2 (1 gm)
1921	Toronto Riverside	Toronto St. Simon's	8-3 (2 gm)
1922	Weston Westonmen	Toronto St. Simon's	6-5 (2 gm)
1923	Weston Westonmen	Brampton Excelsiors	1-0-1
1924	Weston Westonmen	Toronto Maitlands	2-0
1925	Weston Westonmen	Brampton Excelsiors	10-8 (2 gm)
1926	Brampton Excelsiors	Weston Westonmen	10-6 (2 gm)
1927	Weston Westonmen	Brampton Excelsiors	2-0
1928	Oshawa Generals	Brampton Excelsiors	7-? (2 gm)
1929	Oshawa Generals	Brampton Excelsiors	2-0
1930	Brampton Excelsiors	Oshawa Generals	2-0
1931	Brampton Excelsiors	Toronto Native Sons	2-1
Indoor Lacrosse Era
1932	Mimico Mountaineers	Fergus Thistles	2-1
1933	Hamilton Tigers	Mount Dennis Firemen	2-0
1934	Orillia Terriers	Hamilton Tigers	2-0
1935	Orillia Terriers	Burlington Beavers	2-1
1936	Orillia Terriers	Hamilton-Burlington Combines	2-1
1937	Orillia Terriers	Mimico Mountaineers	3-1
1938	St. Catharines Athletics	Orillia Terriers	3-1
1939	St. Catharines Athletics	Mimico Mountaineers	3-1
1940	St. Catharines Athletics	Brampton Excelsiors	4-1
1941	St. Catharines Athletics	Etobicoke Indians	2-1
1942	Mimico-Brampton Combines	St. Catharines Athletics	4-3
1943	Mimico-Brampton Combines	Toronto Lakeshores	4-2
1944	St. Catharines Athletics	Mimico Mountaineers	4-2
1945	St. Catharines Athletics	Brampton-Lakeshore Combines	4-2
1946	St. Catharines Athletics	Mimico Mountaineers	4-3
1947	Mimico Mountaineers	St. Catharines Athletics	4-0
1948	Hamilton Tigers	Mimico Mountaineers	4-0
1949	Hamilton Tigers	Brampton Excelsiors	3-0
1950	Owen Sound Crescents	St. Catharines Athletics	4-3
1951	Peterborough Timbermen	Mimico Mountaineers	4-1
1952	Peterborough Timbermen	Weston Yorks	4-3
1953	Peterborough Trailermen	St. Catharines Athletics	4-1
1954	Peterborough Trailermen	St. Catharines Athletics	4-0
1955	Peterborough Trailermen	Fergus Thistles	4-0
1956	Peterborough Trailermen	Hamilton Burners	4-2
1957	Peterborough Trailermen	Long Branch Pontiacs	4-0
1958	Welland-Crowland Switsons	Brampton Excelsiors	4-0
1959	Peterborough Mercurys	Brampton Excelsiors	4-0
1960	Port Credit Sailors	St. Catharines Athletics	4-1
1961	Brampton Ramblers	Port Credit Sailors	4-3
1962	Brampton Ramblers	Brooklin Hillcrests	4-1
1963	St. Catharines Athletics	Port Credit Sailors	4-0
1964	Brooklin Hillcrests	Brampton Sealtests	4-3
1965	Brooklin Merchants	Brampton Excelsiors	4-3
1966	Peterborough Pepsi Petes	Brampton Excelsiors	4-3
1967	Peterborough Don Byes	Brampton Excelsiors	4-3
1968	Brooklin Redmen	Brampton Excelsiors	4-0
1969	Brooklin Redmen	Brantford Warriors	4-0
1970	Peterborough Lakers	Brantford Warriors	4-1
1971	Brantford Warriors	Peterborough Lakers	4-2
1972	Brantford Warriors	Peterborough Lakers	4-3
1973	Peterborough Lakers	Brantford Warriors	4-2
1974	Windsor Warlocks	Fergus Thistles	4-2
1975	Brampton Excelsiors	Owen Sound North Stars	4-0
1976	Brampton Excelsiors	Fergus Thistles	4-1
1977	Brampton Excelsiors	Owen Sound North Stars	4-1
1978	Peterborough Red Oaks	Owen Sound North Stars	4-0
1979	Peterborough Red Oaks	Brampton Excelsiors	4-1
1980	Brampton Excelsiors	Peterborough Red Oaks	4-1
1981	Brampton Excelsiors	Owen Sound North Stars	4-2
1982	Peterborough Lakers	Fergus Thistles	4-1
1983	Peterborough Lakers	Brooklin Redmen	4-3
1984	Peterborough Lakers	Brooklin Redmen	4-0
1985	Brooklin Redmen	Peterborough Lakers	4-1
1986	Brooklin Redmen	Peterborough Lakers	4-2
1987	Brooklin Redmen	Peterborough Lakers	4-0
1988	Brooklin Redmen	Peterborough Lakers	4-0
1989	Brooklin Redmen	Peterborough Lakers	4-3
1990	Brooklin Redmen	Peterborough Lakers	4-1
1991	Brooklin Redmen	Brampton Excelsiors	4-1
1992	Brampton Excelsiors	Peterborough Lakers	4-0
1993	Brampton Excelsiors	Brooklin Redmen	4-0
1994	Six Nations Chiefs	Brooklin Redmen	4-2
1995	Six Nations Chiefs	Brooklin Redmen	4-0
1996	Six Nations Chiefs	Brampton Excelsiors	4-1
1997	Niagara Falls Gamblers	Brampton Excelsiors	4-3
1998	Brampton Excelsiors	Buffalo Gamblers	4-1
1999	Brampton Excelsiors	Akwesasne Thunder	4-1
2000	Brooklin Redmen	Brampton Excelsiors	4-3
2001	Brampton Excelsiors	Brooklin Redmen	4-1
2002	Brampton Excelsiors	Brooklin Redmen	4-1
2003	Brampton Excelsiors	Peterborough Lakers	4-1
2004	Peterborough Lakers	Brampton Excelsiors	4-3
2005	Peterborough Lakers	Brampton Excelsiors	4-3
2006	Peterborough Lakers	Brampton Excelsiors	4-2
2007	Peterborough Lakers	Brampton Excelsiors	4-2
2008	Brampton Excelsiors	Peterborough Lakers	4-3
2009	Brampton Excelsiors	Peterborough Lakers	4-2
2010	Peterborough Lakers	Brampton Excelsiors	4-3
2011	Brampton Excelsiors	Peterborough Lakers	4-2
2012	Peterborough Lakers	Six Nations Chiefs	4-1
2013	Six Nations Chiefs	Brooklin Redmen	4-0
2014	Six Nations Chiefs	Peterborough Lakers	4-3
2015	Peterborough Lakers	Six Nations Chiefs	4-3
2016	Six Nations Chiefs	Peterborough Lakers	4-3
2017	Peterborough Lakers	Six Nations Chiefs	4-1
2018	Peterborough Lakers	Oakville Rock	4-2
2019	Peterborough Lakers	Six Nations Chiefs	4-2
2022	Peterborough Lakers	Six Nations Chiefs	4-3
2023	Six Nations Chiefs	Peterborough Lakers	4-0
2024	Six Nations Chiefs	Peterborough Lakers	4-2
2025	Six Nations Chiefs	Peterborough Lakers	4-1
2026	Six Nations Chiefs	Peterborough Lakers	4-2

== Defunct teams ==
- Aurora Astros
- Akwesasne Thunder
- Barrie Lakeshores
- Brantford Warriors
- Buffalo Gamblers
- Fergus Thistles
- Hastings Legionnaires
- Huntsville Hawks
- Kitchener-Waterloo Kodiaks
- Mississauga Renegades
- Mississauga Braves
- Niagara Falls Gamblers
- Orangeville Northmen
- Oshweken Wolves
- Sarnia Lumley Wrecking
- Scarborough Saints
- St. Catharines Athletics
- St. Regis Indians
- Toronto Shooting Stars
- Toronto Maple Leafs
- Windsor Warlocks

== See also ==
- Box lacrosse
- Western Lacrosse Association
