= Brooklin Lacrosse Club =

Box lacrosse team in Whitby, Ontario

- Sport: Box lacrosse
- Founded: 1961; 65 years ago
- League: Major Series Lacrosse
- Division: Eastern
- Team history: Brooklin Hillcrest (1961–65); Brooklin Merchants (1965-67); Brooklin Redmen (1967–2019); Brooklin Lacrosse Club (2019–present)
- Based in: Whitby, Ontario
- Arena: Iroquois Park Sports Centre
- Colours: red, white, black
- Head coach: Joel Johnson
- General manager: Will Petschenig
- Captain: Connor Kearnan
- Championships: 7 Mann Cup
- Division titles: 13 MSL Championships, 1 MSL classic championship
- Affiliated teams: Brooklin Merchants (Ontario Series Lacrosse); Whitby Warriors (OLA Jr. A)
- Website: www.brooklinlc.com

The Brooklin Lacrosse Club is a box lacrosse team from Brooklin, Ontario. Brooklin plays in the Major Series Lacrosse (MSL) league (formerly known as Senior "A"). The MSL, and its counterpart, the Western Lacrosse Association, represent the highest level of competitive box lacrosse in Canada. Both league champions compete each September for the Mann Cup, one of the most historic and treasured sports trophies in Canada.

Throughout team history, the Brooklin Lacrosse Club has always been a community based team that represents the best box lacrosse players from Brooklin, Whitby, Durham and nearby regions. The lacrosse club is a non-profit, volunteer operated organization.

The team was formerly known as the Brooklin Redmen, a name the team had held since 1966. On April 20, 2019, the team released a statement that it would be dropping the "Redmen" as the team name owing to a growing sensitivity to the use of Aboriginal people as logos and names for sports teams.

== Championships ==
Mann Cup Canadian Champions (7)

- 1968
- 1969
- 1985
- 1987
- 1988
- 1990
- 2000

Ontario Senior Champions (10)

- 1967
- 1968
- 1969
- 1985
- 1987
- 1988
- 1989
- 1990
- 1991
- 2000

== Season-by-season results ==
Year	GP	W	L	T	Pts	GF	GA	Finish	Playoffs
1966	22	9	13	0	18	228	234	4th	Lost in first round
1967	24	12	12	0	24	250	250	2nd	Lost Mann Cup
1968	23	17	6	0	34	312	198	1st	Won Mann Cup
1969	24	19	5	0	38	381	237	1st	Won Mann Cup
1970	24	14	10	0	28	301	349	3rd	Lost in first round
1971	32	14	18	0	28	451	493	3rd	Lost in first round
1972	Did not play								
1973	12	0	12	0	0	111	266	5th	did not qualify
1974	Did not play								
1975	Did not play								
1976	24	7	17	0	14	280	344	5th	did not qualify
1977	24	10	14	0	20	291	318	3rd	Lost in first round
1978	24	14	10	0	28	300	295	3rd	Lost in first round
1979	24	15	8	1	31	350	269	2nd	Lost in round robin
1980	24	16	8	0	32	371	226	1st	Lost in first round
1981	24	14	10	0	28	252	225	2nd	Lost in first round
1982	24	11	13	0	22	257	308	4th	Lost in first round
1983	24	14	10	0	28	279	204	3rd	Lost in MSL Final
1984	24	20	4	0	40	370	206	2nd	Lost in MSL Final
1985	20	16	4	0	32	330	163	2nd	Won Mann Cup
1986	12	7	5	0	14	134	103	2nd	Lost Mann Cup
1987	20	20	0	0	40	341	105	1st	Won Mann Cup
1988	20	20	0	0	40	363	107	1st	Won Mann Cup
1989	20	20	0	0	40	365	140	1st	Lost Mann Cup
1990	20	16	3	1	33	250	154	1st	Won Mann Cup
1991	16	13	3	0	26	177	136	1st	Lost Mann Cup
1992	16	7	8	1	15	161	158	2nd	Lost in first round
1993	16	9	7	0	18	153	163	2nd	Lost in second round
1994	19	16	3	0	32	218	140	1st	Lost in second round
1995	20	16	3	1	33	269	162	2nd	Lost in second round
1996	24	13	11	0	26	252	244	3rd	Lost in first round
1997	20	7	13	0	14	154	192	4th	Lost in first round
1998	18	10	7	1	21	204	123	3rd	Lost in first round
1999	18	15	2	1	31	212	129	1st	Lost in second round
2000	18	13	5	0	23	285	196	1st	Won Mann Cup
2001	20	15	4	1	31	253	186	1st	Lost in second round
2002	20	14	5	1	29	269	161	2nd	Lost in first round
2003	14	9	5	0	18	143	114	2nd	Lost in first round
2004	18	13	5	0	26	258	159	1st	Lost in second round
2005	18	4	14	0	8	196	227	7th	did not qualify
2006	18	8	10	0	6	195	196	4th	Lost in second round
2007	18	3	14	1	7	167	219	7th	did not qualify
2008	18	7	11	0	14	168	209	4th	Lost in second round
2009	18	4	14	0	8	131	193	6th	Lost in first round
2010	17	3	13	1	7	131	187	5th	Lost in second round
2011	20	13	7	0	26	215	175	2nd	Lost in first round
2012	14	10	4	0	20	143	121	1st	Lost in first round
2013	20	12	7	1	25	188	159	3rd	Lost in second round
2014	18	14	4	0	28	185	160	1st	Lost in first round
2015	18	6	11	1	14	127	165	4th	Lost in first round
2016	18	12	5	1	25	158	142	2nd	Lost in first round
2017	18	7	9	2	16	187	172	3rd	Lost in first round
2018	16	7	8	1	15	143	151	4th	Lost in first round
2019	18	4	14	0	8	130	167	6th	did not qualify
2020	Did not play Covid- 19								
2021	8	7	1	0	14	107	80	1st	Won MSL Classic
2022	12	6	5	1	13	121	106	3rd	Lost 1st round
2023	14	8	6	0	16			3rd	Lost 1st round
2024	12	9	3	0	18	133	97	2nd	Lost 2nd round
2025	18	11	7	0	22	174	152	3rd	Lost 1st round
2026	18	10	8	0	20	177	157	5th	did not qualify

== Awards ==
Mike Kelly Memorial trophy (Mann Cup MVP)

- 1968 – Joe Tomchyshyn
- 1969 – Bill Squire
- 1985 – Wayne Colley
- 1987 – Jim Meredith
- 1990 – Paul Gait
- 2000 – Nick Trudeau

Bucko MacDonald Trophy (top scorer)

- 1969 – Elmer Tran
- 1980 – Ken Colley
- 1985 – Gil Nieuwendyk
- 1986 – John Fusco
- 1987 – Derek Keenan
- 1988 – Derek Keenan
- 1989 – Gary Gait
- 1990 – Peter Parke
- 1991 – Peter Parke
- 1999 – Shawn Williams
- 2001 – Shawn Williams
- 2004 – Shawn Williams
- 2007 – Shawn Williams
- 2011 – Shawn Williams
- 2012 – Shawn Williams
- 2022 - Dyson Williams

Jim Murphy Trophy (regular season MVP)

- 1968 – Sandy Doberstein
- 1985 – John Jordan
- 1987 – Derek Keenan
- 1988 – Derek Keenan
- 1989 – Gary Gait
- 1990 – Peter Parke
- 1991 – John Fusco
- 1994 – Paddy O'Toole
- 1998 – Rob Blasdell
- 2005 – Shawn Williams
- 2007 – Shawn Williams
- 2011 – Shawn Williams
- 2017 – Reilly O'Connor
- 2024 – Zack Higgins

Gene Dopp Memorial Trophy (rookie of the year)

- 1969 – Merv Marshall
- 1977 – Stan Cockerton
- 1980 – Ken Colley
- 1983 – Gil Nieuwendyk
- 1989 – Gary Gait
- 2000 – Gavin Prout
- 2008 – Derek Hopcroft
- 2022 - Dyson Williams

Merv McKnzie Trophy (most valuable defenceman)

- 1967 – Bob Hanna
- 1968 – Paul Tran
- 1976 – Peter Vipond
- 1978 – Jim Branton
- 1980 – Blaine Harrison
- 1982 – Fred Upshaw
- 1983 – Blaine Harrison
- 1987 – Kevin Antram
- 1989 – Blane Harrison
- 1992 – Greg Lepine
- 1994 – Eric Perroni
- 2004 – Derek Suddons
- 2016 – Graeme Hossack
- 2018 – Chris Corbeil

Harry Lumley Award (fewest goals against)

- 1968 – Justin Howe
- 1969 – Merv Marshall & Justin Howe
- 1979 – Paul Boland, Kent Wentzell & Wayne Colley
- 1980 – Wayne Colley & Kent Wentzell
- 1981 – Wayne Colley & Kelvin Linton
- 1983 – Wayne Colley & Paul Boland
- 1987 – Wayne Colley & Ken Passfield
- 1988 – Wayne Colley & Ted Sawicki
- 1989 – Wayne Colley & Ted Sawicki
- 1990 – Wayne Colley, Ken Passfeild & Chris O'Reilly
- 1994 – Paddy O'Toole & Paul Mootz
- 1999 – Rob Blasdell & Mike Wye
- 2001 – Rob Blasdell, Gee Nash & Phil Wetherup
- 2003 – Gee Nash, Ken Barrett & Scott Wylie

Terry Sanderson Award (Coaching Staff of the year)

- 2022 - Jason Crosbie, Gavin Prout & Derek Suddons
- 2024 - Joel Johnson, Brad Reed & Clancy Almas

== Current roster ==
Goaltenders

- 1 (Canada) Zach Higgins
- 30 (Canada) Mike Poulin

Runners

- 2 (Canada)
- 4 (Canada) Graeme Hossack
- 5 (Canada) Mitch Wilde
- 6 (Canada) Matt Hossack
- 7 (Canada)
- 8 (Canada) Brodie Tutton
- 9 (Canada) Reilly O'Connor
- 10 (Canada) Chris Corbeil
- 11 (Canada) Austin Shanks
- 12 (Canada) Kyle Whitlow
- 14 (Canada) Dan Lintner
- 15 (Canada) Ryan Keenan
- 16 (Canada) Curtis Knight
- 17 (Canada) Sean Darroch
- 18 (Canada) Austin Murphy
- 19 (Canada) Mitch McMichael
- 20 (Canada) Holden Garlent
- 22 (Canada) Sean Darroch
- 24 (Canada) Colton Watkinson
- 26 (Canada) Connor Laird
- 28 (Canada) Kyle Rubisch
- 32 (Canada) Shayne Jackson
- 33 (Canada) John Lafontaine
- 37 (Canada) Adrian Sorichetti
- 43 (Canada) Ryan MacSpadyen
- 44 (Canada) Matt Spanger

As of 4 March 2012

Head coach

- Brad MacArthur

Assistant coaches

- Jason Crosbie
- Derek Suddons

Scouting director

- Clancy Almas

Video coach

- Ryan Preston

Equipment managers

- Paul Wade
- Greg Linton

Trainer

- Kaylin Fraser

General manager

- Brad MacArthur

As of June 2020

== Notable alumni ==
- Shawn Williams
- Gavin Prout
- Brad MacArthur
- Gil Niewendyk
- Derek Keenan
- Derek Suddons
- Derek Hopcroft
- Dan Ball
- Stan Cockerton
- Wayne Colley
- Ken Colley
- Gary Gait
- Paul Gait
- Elmer Tran
- Paul Tran
- John Fusco
- Peter Parke
- Eric Perroni
- Andy Perroni
- Peter Vipond
- Mike Gray
- Tom Wreggitt
- Bill Down
- Don Craggs
- Ken Lotton
- Glen Lotton
- Glen Clark
- Steve Toll
- Blaine Harrison
- Paul St. John
- Scott McMichael
- Ryan McMichael
- Mitch McMicahel
- Dan Ladouceur
- Brad Reed
- Nick Trudeau
- John Jordan
- Bill Callan
- Don "Sully" Vipond
- Emil Labaj
- Greg Lepine

== Hall of fame members ==
=== Canadian Lacrosse Hall of Fame ===
Name	Year	Category
E.J. Gene Dopp	1966	Builder
Lloyd "Moon" Wootton	1966	Player
Pat Barker	1980	Player
Cy Coombs	1985	Player
Larry Ferguson	1989	Player
Ken Crawford	1991	Player
Terry Davis	1992	Player
Grant Heffernan	1994	Player
Glen Lotton	1996	Player
Bob Hanna	1997	Builder
Jim Wasson	2003	Player
Jim Meredith	2005	Player
Elmer Tran	2005	Player
Peter Vipond	2006	Builder
Wayne Colley	2006	Player
Bob Vessey	2008	Builder
John Fusco	2010	Player
Mike Gray	2012	Builder
Derek Keenan	2012	Player
Tom Marechek	2012	Player
Tom Wreggitt	2012	player
Doug Deschner	2013	Player
Gary Gait	2014	Player
Paul Gait	2014	Player
Gilbert Nieuwendyk	2014	Player
Larry Lloyd	2015	Player
Don Craggs	2017	Veteran
Ken Colley	2017	Player
Eric Perroni	2021	Player
Chuck Li	2021	Veteran
Blane Harrison	2022	Player
Gavin Prout	2023	Player
Glenn Clark	2026	Player

In addition to these players, the 1985, 1986, 1987, 1988, 1989, 1990, and 1991 teams were inducted.

=== Ontario Lacrosse Hall of Fame ===
Name	Year	Category
Stan Cockerton	1997	Player
Don Craggs	1997	Player
Bob Hanna	1997	Player
Merv Marshall	1997	Player
Jim Wasson	1997	Player
Wayne Colley	1998	Player
Cam Devine	1998	Builder/Player
Elmer Tran	1998	Player
Ted Sawicki	1999	Player
Peter Vipond	2004	Builder
Terry Lloyd	2008	Builder
Larry "Wamper" Powers	2008	Special Consideration
Gerald Ravary	2008	Builder
Tom Wreggitt	2011	Player
Gilbert Nieuwendyk	2012	Player
Chuck Li	2013	Player
Dwayne Jacobs	2015	Player
Scott McMicahel	2017	Player
Eric Perroni	2018	Player
Robert (Bob) Vesey	2018	Builder
Ken (scooter) Lotton	2019	Veteran
Gavin Prout	2020	Player
John Fusco	2024	Player
Jim Meredith	2025	Player
Ken Colley	2025	Player
Shawn Williams	2026	Player
Mike Gray	2025	Builder

== Team records ==
Individual player records for a single Regular season
Statistic	Player	Total	Season
Most goals	Ken Colley	72	1980
Most assists	Shawn Williams	78	2004
Most points	Gil Nieuwendyk	132	1984
Most Penalty Minutes	Scott McMichael	158	1990

Individual player records for a single post season
Statistic	Player	Total	Season
Most goals	Gary Gait	46	1989
Most assists	Gil Nieuwendyk	43	1984
Most points	Gil Nieuwendyk	68	1984
Most Penalty Minutes	Scott McMichael	126	1989
