= Cobourg Kodiaks =

- Founded: 2016
- League: Major Series Lacrosse
- Based in: Cobourg, Ontario
- Arena: Cobourg Community Centre
- Owner: Eric Graham, John Webb
- Head coach: Jamie Dubrick
- Playoff berths: 4 (2022, 2023, 2024, 2026)

The Cobourg Kodiaks, originally the Kitchener-Waterloo Kodiaks, are a Major Series Lacrosse team located in Cobourg, Ontario. They are a Senior "A" box lacrosse team, which play in the Major Series Lacrosse league. The MSL consists of six teams, including the Kodiaks. Most of the players in this league play or have played in the National Lacrosse League (NLL). Each year, the MSL playoff teams battle for the right to compete against the Western Lacrosse Association champion for the highly prized Mann Cup. The championship is hosted alternately between Ontario and British Columbia every year. The Kodiaks play eighteen games throughout their season, with their nine home games being played out of the Cobourg Community Centre, or CCC.

== History ==
The Kitchener-Waterloo Kodiaks were officially renamed, as well as moved, to Cobourg Ontario as the Cobourg Kodiaks on February 1, 2016. Their first season in their new home was the 2016 regular season, with their first home game occurring on May 29, 2016. Joey Cupido is their inaugural captain.

== Season-by-Season Results ==
Season	GP	W	L	T	GF	GA	Results	Playoffs
2016	18	1	16	1	122	227	6th, MSL	Did Not Qualify
2017	18	2	16	0	108	242	6th, MSL	Did Not Qualify
2018	16	2	12	2	145	189	6th, MSL	Did Not Qualify
2019	18	6	12	0	152	188	6th, MSL	Did Not Qualify
2021	8	5	3	0	93	97	2nd, MSL	No Playoffs Held
2022	12	2	10	0	80	121	4th, MSL	Lost Semifinals, 4-0 (Chiefs)
2023	16	3	13	0	149	173	4th, MSL	Lost Semifinals, 4-1 (Chiefs)
2024	12	5	7	0	85	112	4th, MSL	Won Quarterfinals, 3-1 (Rock) Lost Semifinals, 4-0 (Chiefs)
2025	18	6	12	0	147	205	5th, MSL	Did Not Qualify
2026	18	10	8	0	172	177	4th, MSL	Lost Semifinals, 3-0 (Chiefs)
Total	154	42	109	3	1,253	1,731		0 Championships
