= Nanaimo Timbermen =

Professional box lacrosse team in British Columbia

- Founded: 2005
- Home arena: Frank Crane Arena
- City: Nanaimo, British Columbia
- Colours: Red, Black, Grey, White
- GM: Earl Nicholson
- Head Coach: Kaleb Toth
- Mann Cups: 0 National Championships
- Division titles: 0 Provincial Championships
- Website: tmen.ca

The Nanaimo Timbermen are a Senior A box lacrosse club, based in Nanaimo, British Columbia. The team competes in the 7-team Western Lacrosse Association (WLA).

The Timbermen have not been the most successful team since their entry in 2005. Qualifying for the WLA playoffs only 5 times, they are yet to win a championship. They are one of two Western teams to have never won the Mann Cup.

Unlike their island counterparts, the Victoria Shamrocks, the Timbermen rely on mostly local talent with 9 of their players coming from the Nanaimo area and 19 of their players coming from Vancouver Island.

This team is not related to the similarly named Nanaimo Timbermen that played in the WLA from 1951 to 1961 and also from 1975 to 1981.

== All time Record ==
Season	Team name	Games	Win	Losses	Tie	GF	GA	Points	Playoffs
2005	Nanaimo Timbermen	18	4	14	0	175	238	8	Did Not Qualify
2006	Nanaimo Timbermen	18	3	14	1	153	236	7	Did Not Qualify
2007	Nanaimo Timbermen	18	7	11	0	191	211	14	Defeated in Semi-Finals
2008	Nanaimo Timbermen	18	4	13	1	141	218	9	Did Not Qualify
2009	Nanaimo Timbermen	18	4	11	3	182	224	11	Did Not Qualify
2010	Nanaimo Timbermen	18	9	9	0	188	193	18	Did Not Qualify
2011	Nanaimo Timbermen	18	7	9	2	171	175	16	Did Not Qualify
2012	Nanaimo Timbermen	18	6	11	1	178	192	13	Did Not Qualify
2013	Nanaimo Timbermen	18	5	13	0	161	198	10	Did Not Qualify
2014	Nanaimo Timbermen	18	4	13	1	131	186	9	Did Not Qualify
2015	Nanaimo Timbermen	18	3	15	0	137	192	6	Did Not Qualify
2016	Nanaimo Timbermen	18	4	14	0	154	181	8	Did Not Qualify
2017	Nanaimo Timbermen	18	7	10	1	166	183	15	Did Not Qualify
2018	Nanaimo Timbermen	18	10	7	1	166	156	21	Defeated in Semi-Finals
2019	Nanaimo Timbermen	18	10	7	1	168	164	21	Defeated in Semi-Finals
2020	season cancelled								
2021	season cancelled								
2022	Nanaimo Timbermen	18	12	6	0	193	156	24	Defeated in Finals
2023	Nanaimo Timbermen	18	12	6	0	185	165	24	Defeated in Semi-Finals
2024	Nanaimo Timbermen	18	6	11	1	162	172	13	Did Not Qualify
2025	Nanaimo Timbermen	18	2	16	0	130	177	4	Did Not Qualify
2026	Nanaimo Timbermen	18	8	10	0	156	172	16	Defeated in Semi-Finals
