= Kitchener–Waterloo Kodiaks =

- Logo of the Kitchener-Waterloo Kodiaks
- Founded: 2003
- Disbanded: 2015
- Based in: Kitchener, Ontario
- Home ground: Waterloo Memorial Recreation Complex
- Colors: Purple and black
- League titles: OLA Senior B Lacrosse League (2003-2006) Major Series Lacrosse (2007–2015)

The Kitchener–Waterloo Kodiaks were a Senior "A" box lacrosse team from Waterloo, Ontario. The Kodiaks played in the Eastern Division of the Major Series Lacrosse Senior "A" Lacrosse League where they competed in a 20 game regular season (10 at home) from May through July and playoffs beginning in August and ending with the Mann Cup in September. The Kodiaks played their home games at the Waterloo Memorial Recreation Complex, a multi-purpose recreational complex located in Waterloo, Ontario. After the 2015 season, the team moved to Cobourg, Ontario and became the Cobourg Kodiaks.

== History ==
Prior to the 2003 Sr. B Season, Kitchener-Waterloo was awarded a franchise in the League. The Kodiaks competed in the OLA Senior B League starting in 2003. However, on March 12, 2006, the Ontario Lacrosse Association approved the sale of the St. Catharines Athletics franchise to the Kodiaks and the subsequent promotion to the Sr. A loop for the 2007 season. After years of declining support and attendance for the team, owner Al Orth sold the team to a group of investors from Cobourg, Ontario. The Kodiaks' last season in Kitchener–Waterloo was the 2015 season with the team moving to Cobourg and becoming the Cobourg Kodiaks for the 2016 season.

== Season-by-Season results ==
Season	GP	W	L	T	GF	GA	P	Results	Playoffs
2003	16	13	2	1	152	106	27	2nd OSBLL	Lost final, won Presidents Cup
2004	16	12	4	0	162	101	24	2nd OSBLL	Lost semi-final
2005	14	10	4	0	134	98	20	1st OSBLL	Won League, won Presidents Cup
2006	18	5	12	1	158	224	11	6th MSL	Lost quarter-final
2007	18	4	14	0	164	210	8	6th MSL	Lost quarter-final
2008	18	6	10	2	160	188	14	5th MSL	Lost quarter-final
2009	18	9	9	0	164	184	18	4th MSL	Lost quarter-final
2010	16	6	9	1	135	139	13	4th MSL	Lost quarter-final
2011	19	4	15	0	143	193	8	5th MSL	Lost quarter-final
2012	14	5	8	1	123	125	11	5th MSL	Lost quarter-final
2013	20	10	9	1	200	181	21	4th MSL	Lost quarter-final
2014	18	10	8	0	153	154	20	3rd MSL	Lost semi-final
2015	18	4	13	1	130	167	9	6th MSL	Lost quarter-final

== Presidents Cup Results ==
Season	Location	GP	W	L	GF	GA	Result
2003	Owen Sound, ON	5	4	1	48	41	Won Gold
2005	Waterloo, ON	5	5	0	62	23	Won Gold
