= Peterborough Lakers (MSL) =

- Founded: 1968; 58 years ago
- League: Major Series Lacrosse
- Based in: Peterborough, Ontario
- Arena: Peterborough Memorial Centre
- Colours: Blue, White & Red
- President: Ted Higgins
- Head coach: Mike Hasen
- General manager: Paul Day
- League titles: 26 (1951, 1952, 1953, 1954, 1955, 1956, 1957, 1959, 1966, 1970, 1973, 1978, 1979, 1982, 1983, 1984, 2004, 2005, 2006, 2007, 2010, 2012, 2015, 2017, 2018, 2019, 2022)
- Mann Cups: 18 (1951, 1952, 1953, 1954, 1966, 1973, 1978, 1982, 1984, 2004, 2006, 2007, 2010, 2012, 2017, 2018, 2019, 2022)
- Website: www.peterboroughlakers.ca

The Peterborough Lakers are Senior "A" box lacrosse team from Peterborough, Ontario. They play in the Major Series Lacrosse league where under the current format, they compete in 16 regular season games from May through July and playoffs beginning in August and ending with the Mann Cup in September. The Lakers play their home games at the 4,329-seat multipurpose Peterborough Memorial Centre.

== Championships ==
Peterborough has won the Ontario Championship 26 times in total (1951 to 1957, 1959, 1966, 1970, 1973, 1978, 1979, 1982 to 1984, 2004 to 2007, 2010, 2012, 2015, and 2017 to 2019, 2022) and the Mann Cup 18 times in total (1951 to 1954, 1966, 1973, 1978, 1982, 1984, 2004, 2006, 2007, 2010, 2012, 2017 to 2019, 2022), of which only 13 were while the team was using the name Lakers. As the Lakers, they won the Mann Cup in: 2022, 2019, 2018, 2017, 2012, 2010, 2007, 2004, 1984, 1982, 1973, and 1966.

== Rivalries ==
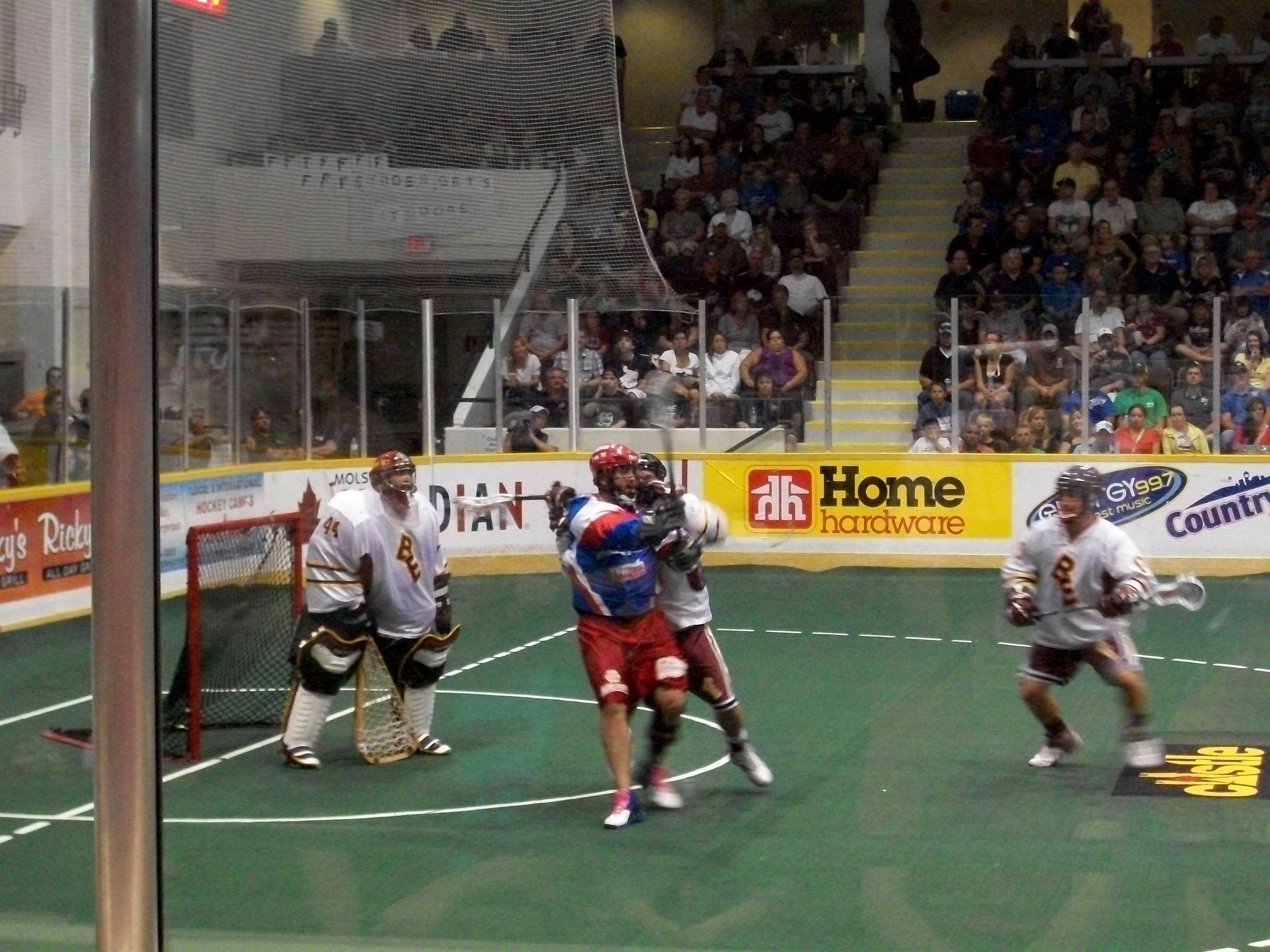
Players struggle for position during a Lakers vs Excelsiors game in 2011.

In the early 2000s, the Lakers' biggest rival were the Brampton Excelsiors. They met in the MSL Finals every year Between the 2003 and 2011 seasons, often finishing 1st and 2nd overall in the regular season. Meeting each other so often in the playoffs, compounded by many of the players playing on rival teams in the National Lacrosse League, which created many intensely contested matches between the two teams. Despite players coming and going between the two franchises, the rivalry has lived on, if not on the floor, then most certainly in the stands.

A rivalry also exists with the Six Nations Chiefs, particularly after the 2011 emotional MSL semi-finals where tempers flared amongst fans and players alike, and meeting in the MSL Finals in 2012, and 2014 through to 2017.

== Community Support ==
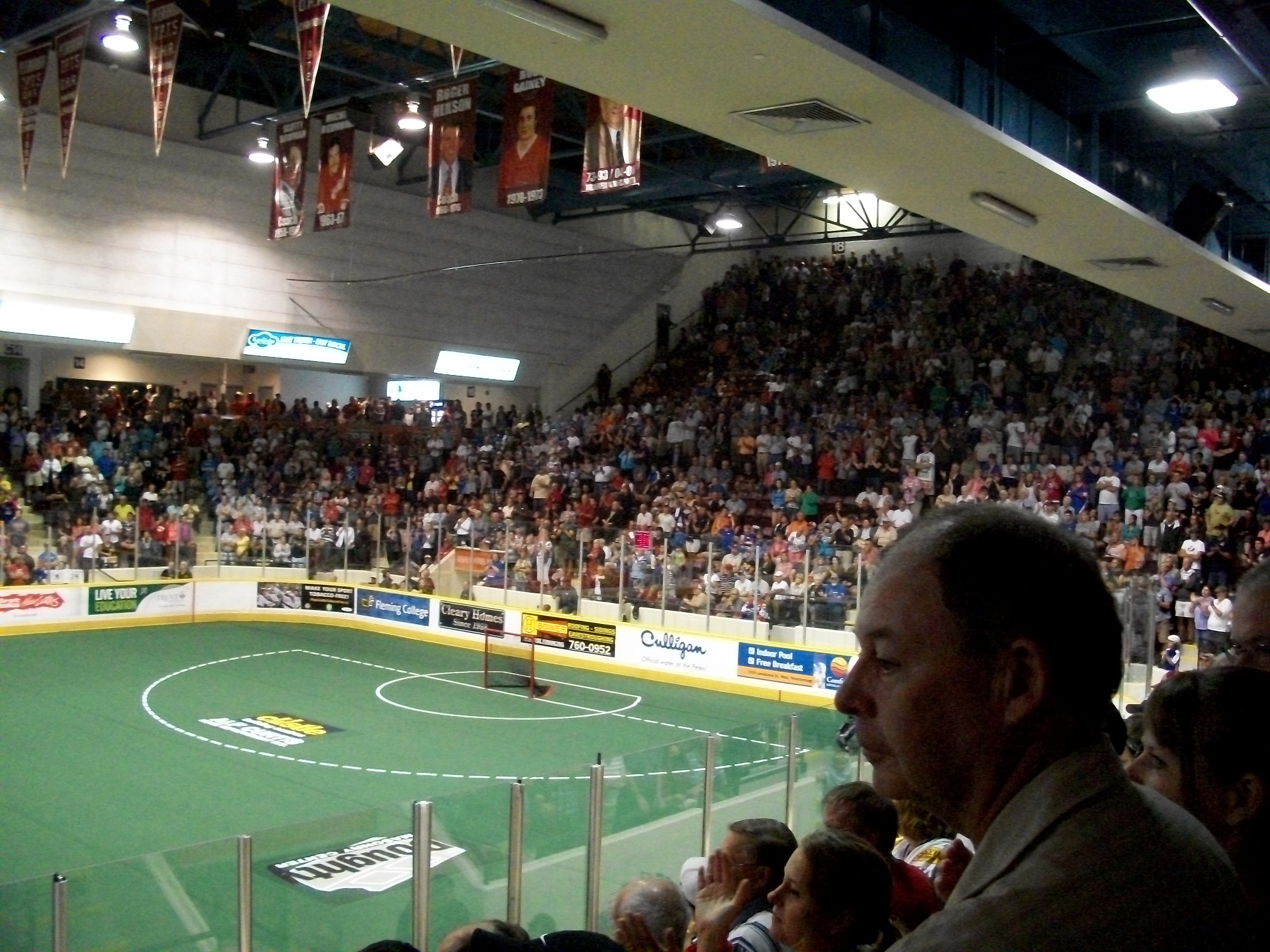
Lakers fans fill the Memorial Centre during game 7 of the 2011 MSL semi-finals against the Six Nations Chiefs.

=== Fans ===
After going through a period of low attendance during the 90's, the Lakers have enjoyed a renewed level of support from fans and the community at large. In recent years, the Lakers have become affectionately known as "The Lake Show'". Throughout the playoffs, local businesses and city busses display signs supporting the Peterborough Lakers.

During games, including away games, Lakers fans will chant in unison "Let's go Lakers" followed by 5 claps or individual fans may yell "Let's go you Lakers". In addition, fans have been known to heckle opposing players, particularly Brampton Excelsiors goaltender Anthony Cosmo and Brampton forward Josh Sanderson. Peterborough has gained notoriety from outside the local area, as Bob Chavez of the Rochester Democrat & Chronicle referred to Lakers home games as "full and loud and wild...a great setting for lacrosse."

=== Attendance ===
Attendance for Lakers games has increased significantly over the last decade. In 2011, total attendance for the Lakers home games was 29,910 averaging 2,991 per regular season game and 27,651 averaging 3,456 per playoff game (the Lakers hosted 8 playoff games in 2011). Every summer, Camp Moshava in Selwyn, Ontario sends a group of over 300 campers and staff to a Lakers home game, and in recent years, the MH choir has performed the Canadian national anthem prior to the game. The Lakers are the most attended team in the MSL.

=== Broadcast ===
Lakers home games and some away games are broadcast locally on TVCogeco with play-by-play man Pete Dalliday and analyst/host Scott Arnold In years where the Lakers play in the Mann Cup, the games are broadcast online on a PPV basis. Local radio stations will also provide updates during games and local TV station CHEX-TV will air highlights during their Newswatch broadcast.

== Carpet ==
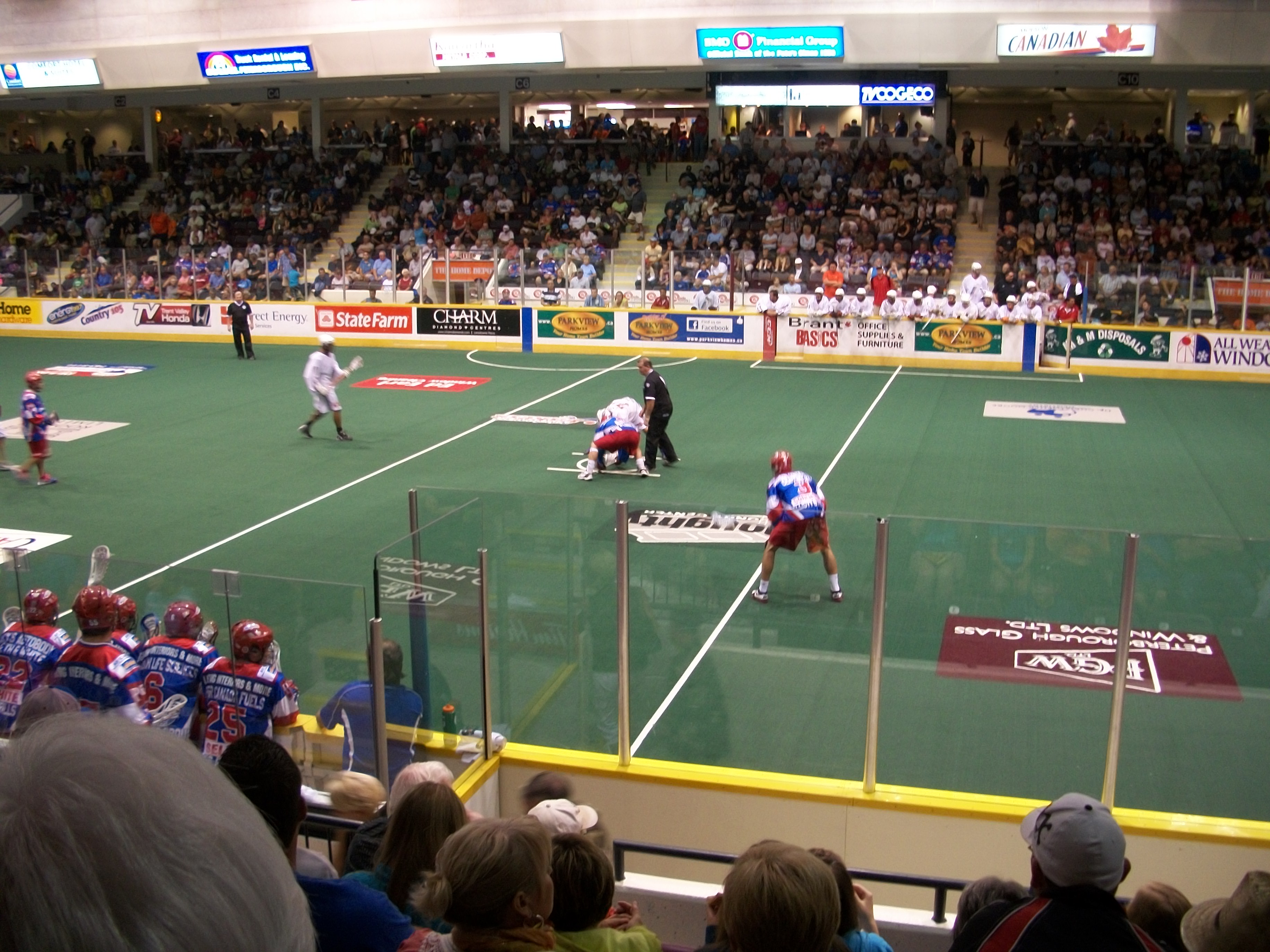
Centre Floor of the PMC during a Lakers home game

In 2008, the Peterborough City Council agreed to a 10-year $120,000 interest-free loan to finance the purchase and installation of a carpet for use by the Lakers in the Memorial Centre . The carpet was initially met with some resistance from some on council, however the plan was approved. Councillors argued it would increase usage of the Peterborough Memorial Centre during the Summer, increase player safety and would allow co-existence of the Lakers and the Peterborough Petes of the Ontario Hockey League . To finance the carpet, sponsors are able to purchase advertising on the carpet during Lakers home games.

== Roster ==
Goaltender

- 37 (Canada) Drew Hutchison
- 57 (Canada) Doug Buchan
- 60 (Canada) Landon Kells

Defence

- 4 (Canada) Colton Armstrong
- 10 (Canada) Jake Withers
- 11 (Canada) Adam Thistlethwaite
- 12 (Canada) Holden Lowes
- 17 (Canada) Jordan Stouros
- 18 (Canada) Robert Hope (C)
- 21 (Canada) Eric Shewell
- 26 (Canada) Andrew Vradenberg
- 32 (Canada) Taylor Jensen
- 41 (Canada) Alex Pace
- 55 (Canada) Dylan Hutchinson
- 68 (Canada) Mitch Ogilvie
- 81 (Canada) Matt Gilray (A)
- 82 (Canada) Joey Cupido

Offence

- 5 (Canada) Turner Evans (A)
- 6 (Canada) Rob Hellyer
- 7 (Canada) Cam Milligan
- 8 (Canada) Austin Hasen
- 16 (United States) Joe Resetarits
- 19 (Canada) Thomas Hoggarth
- 22 (Canada) Koleton Marquis
- 25 (Canada) Owen Hiltz
- 45 (Canada) Carter Page
- 91 (Canada) Taite Cattoni
- 99 (Canada) Holden Cattoni

Injured Reserve

- 27 (Canada) Josh Currier
- 44 (Canada) Chad Tutton
- 94 (Canada) Bryce Sweeting

Head Coach

- (Canada) Mike Hasen

Assistant Coaches

- (Canada) Mat Giles
- (Canada) Bobby Keast
- (Canada) Tracy Kelusky

Last updated: 14-SEPT-18

== All-time box lacrosse record ==
| Season | Team name | Games | Win | Losses | Tie | GF | GA | Points | Playoffs |
|---|---|---|---|---|---|---|---|---|---|
| 1950 | Peterborough Timbermen | 28 | 15 | 13 | 0 | 345 | 286 | 30 | Defeated in Ontario Quarter-Finals |
| 1951 | Peterborough Timbermen | 30 | 23 | 7 | 0 | 411 | 262 | 46 | Won Mann Cup (1st) |
| 1952 | Peterborough Timbermen | 30 | 23 | 7 | 0 | 416 | 250 | 46 | Won Mann Cup (2nd) |
| 1953 | Peterborough Trailermen | 30 | 25 | 5 | 0 | 451 | 249 | 50 | Won Mann Cup (3rd) |
| 1954 | Peterborough Trailermen | 30 | 25 | 5 | 0 | 451 | 249 | 50 | Won Mann Cup (4th) |
| 1955 | Peterborough Trailermen | 24 | 19 | 5 | 0 | 419 | 221 | 38 | Defeated in Mann Cup |
| 1956 | Peterborough Trailermen | 25 | 19 | 6 | 0 | 275 | 196 | 38 | Defeated in Mann Cup |
| 1957 | Peterborough Trailermen | 18 | 13 | 5 | 0 | 228 | 170 | 26 | Ontario Champions / DQ at Mann Cup |
| 1958 | Peterborough Timbermen | 24 | 9 | 15 | 0 | 246 | 278 | 18 | Defeated in Ontario Semi-Finals |
| 1959 | Peterborough Mercurys | 23 | 17 | 6 | 0 | 274 | 196 | 34 | Defeated in Mann Cup |
| 1960 | Peterborough Mercurys | 24 | 7 | 16 | 1 | 193 | 263 | 15 | Defeated in Ontario Semi-Finals |
| 1961 | Did not compete | | | | | | | | |
| 1962 | Did not compete | | | | | | | | |
| 1963 | Did not compete | | | | | | | | |
| 1964 | Peterborough Speedy Erns | 24 | 10 | 14 | 0 | 260 | 295 | 20 | Defeated in Ontario Semi-Finals |
| 1965 | Peterborough Speedy Erns | 24 | 15 | 8 | 1 | 316 | 247 | 31 | Defeated in Ontario Semi-Finals |
| 1966 | Peterborough Pepsi Petes | 23 | 15 | 7 | 1 | 279 | 218 | 31 | Won Mann Cup (5th) |
| 1967 | Peterborough Don Byes | 24 | 17 | 4 | 3 | 288 | 212 | 37 | Defeated in Ontario Semi-Finals |
| 1968 | Peterborough Lakers (NLA Pro) | 38 | 21 | 17 | 0 | 478 | 397 | 42 | Defeated in NLA Pro Semi-Finals |
| 1969 | Peterborough Lakers (OLA Sr A) | 24 | 5 | 18 | 1 | 227 | 288 | 11 | Defeated in Ontario Semi-Finals |
| 1969 | Peterborough Lakers (ELA/NLA Pro) | 29 | 19 | 10 | 0 | 435 | 315 | 38 | Won NLA Pro Championship (1st) |
| 1970 | Peterborough Lakers | 24 | 16 | 6 | 2 | 386 | 267 | 34 | Defeated in Mann Cup |
| 1971 | Peterborough Lakers | 32 | 29 | 3 | 0 | 578 | 341 | 58 | Defeated in Ontario Finals |
| 1972 | Peterborough Lakers | 32 | 19 | 12 | 1 | 415 | 416 | 39 | Defeated in Ontario Finals |
| 1973 | Peterborough Lakers | 24 | 15 | 9 | 0 | 363 | 310 | 30 | Won Mann Cup (6th) |
| 1974 | Did not compete | | | | | | | | |
| 1975 | Did not compete | | | | | | | | |
| 1976 | Did not compete | | | | | | | | |
| 1977 | Did not compete | | | | | | | | |
| 1978 | Peterborough Red Oaks | 24 | 16 | 8 | 0 | 346 | 313 | 32 | Won Mann Cup (7th) |
| 1979 | Peterborough Red Oaks | 24 | 16 | 6 | 2 | 389 | 269 | 34 | Defeated in Mann Cup |
| 1980 | Peterborough Red Oaks | 24 | 14 | 8 | 0 | 366 | 296 | 28 | Defeated in Ontario Finals |
| 1981 | Peterborough Red Oaks | 24 | 15 | 8 | 1 | 321 | 262 | 31 | Defeated in Ontario Semi-Finals |
| 1982 | Peterborough Lakers | 24 | 16 | 8 | 0 | 380 | 245 | 32 | Won Mann Cup (8th) |
| 1983 | Peterborough Lakers | 24 | 17 | 7 | 0 | 300 | 230 | 34 | Defeated in Mann Cup |
| 1984 | Peterborough Lakers | 24 | 23 | 1 | 0 | 420 | 196 | 46 | Won Mann Cup (9th) |
| 1985 | Peterborough Lakers | 20 | 19 | 1 | 0 | 336 | 138 | 38 | Defeated in Ontario Finals |
| 1986 | Peterborough Lakers | 12 | 9 | 3 | 0 | 148 | 93 | 18 | Defeated in Ontario Finals |
| 1987 | Peterborough Lakers | 20 | 9 | 11 | 0 | 208 | 210 | 18 | Defeated in Ontario Finals |
| 1988 | Peterborough Quakers | 20 | 15 | 4 | 1 | 308 | 139 | 31 | Defeated in Ontario Finals |
| 1989 | Peterborough Quakers | 20 | 14 | 6 | 0 | 264 | 178 | 28 | Defeated in Ontario Finals |
| 1990 | Peterborough Quakers | 20 | 14 | 5 | 1 | 208 | 163 | 29 | Defeated in Ontario Finals |
| 1991 | Peterborough Quakers | 16 | 10 | 6 | 0 | 167 | 129 | 20 | Defeated in Ontario Semi-finals (Round-Robin) |
| 1992 | Peterborough Quakers | 16 | 7 | 9 | 0 | 128 | 138 | 14 | Defeated in Ontario Finals |
| 1993 | Peterborough Quakers | 16 | 6 | 9 | 1 | 143 | 149 | 13 | Defeated in Ontario Semi-Finals |
| 1994 | Peterborough Lakers | 19 | 7 | 11 | 1 | 154 | 179 | 15 | Defeated in Ontario Semi-Finals |
| 1995 | Peterborough Lakers | 20 | 4 | 16 | 0 | 140 | 267 | 8 | Did not qualify |
| 1996 | Peterborough Lakers | 24 | 11 | 13 | 0 | 259 | 266 | 22 | Defeated in Ontario Semi-Finals |
| 1997 | Peterborough Lakers | 20 | 4 | 16 | 0 | 159 | 231 | 8 | Did not qualify |
| 1998 | Peterborough Lakers | 18 | 8 | 8 | 2 | 165 | 174 | 18 | Defeated in Ontario Semi-Finals |
| 1999 | Peterborough Lakers | 18 | 11 | 6 | 1 | 171 | 146 | 23 | Defeated in Ontario Semi-Finals |
| 2000 | Peterborough Lakers | 18 | 12 | 6 | 0 | 214 | 177 | 24 | Defeated in Ontario Semi-Finals |
| 2001 | Peterborough Lakers | 20 | 10 | 8 | 2 | 243 | 220 | 22 | Defeated in Ontario Semi-Finals |
| 2002 | Peterborough Lakers | 20 | 12 | 6 | 2 | 245 | 178 | 26 | Defeated in Ontario Semi-Finals |
| 2003 | Peterborough Lakers | 14 | 8 | 6 | 0 | 154 | 131 | 16 | Defeated in Ontario Finals |
| 2004 | Peterborough Lakers | 18 | 13 | 5 | 0 | 238 | 158 | 26 | Won Mann Cup (10th) |
| 2005 | Peterborough Lakers | 18 | 14 | 4 | 0 | 224 | 172 | 28 | Defeated in Mann Cup |
| 2006 | Peterborough Lakers | 18 | 13 | 4 | 1 | 202 | 159 | 27 | Won Mann Cup (11th) |
| 2007 | Peterborough Lakes | 17 | 13 | 3 | 1 | 197 | 144 | 27 | Won Mann Cup (12th) |
| 2008 | Peterborough Lakers | 18 | 12 | 5 | 1 | 196 | 156 | 25 | Defeated in Ontario Finals |
| 2009 | Peterborough Lakers | 18 | 12 | 6 | 0 | 201 | 149 | 24 | Defeated in Ontario Finals |
| 2010 | Peterborough Lakers | 16 | 14 | 2 | 0 | 183 | 126 | 28 | Won Mann Cup (13th) |
| 2011 | Peterborough Lakers | 20 | 16 | 4 | 0 | 233 | 171 | 32 | Defeated in Ontario Finals |
| 2012 | Peterborough Lakers | 14 | 9 | 5 | 0 | 169 | 112 | 18 | Won Mann Cup (14th) |
| 2013 | Peterborough Lakers | 20 | 13 | 7 | 0 | 217 | 188 | 26 | Defeated in Ontario Semi-Finals |
| 2014 | Peterborough Lakers | 18 | 10 | 8 | 0 | 199 | 153 | 20 | Defeated in Ontario Finals |
| 2015 | Peterborough Lakers | 20 | 14 | 4 | 0 | 196 | 138 | 28 | Defeated in Mann Cup |
| 2016 | Peterborough Lakers | 18 | 14 | 3 | 1 | 193 | 122 | 29 | Defeated in Ontario Finals |
| 2017 | Peterborough Lakers | 18 | 17 | 1 | 0 | 248 | 143 | 34 | Won Mann Cup (15th) |
| 2018 | Peterborough Lakers | 16 | 12 | 3 | 1 | 172 | 130 | 25 | Won Mann Cup (16th) |
| 2019 | Peterborough Lakers | 18 | 14 | 4 | 0 | 196 | 164 | 28 | Won Mann Cup (17th) |
| 2020 | Season did not occur | | | | | | | | |
| 2021 | Season did not occur | | | | | | | | |
| 2022 | Peterborough Lakers | 12 | 7 | 5 | 0 | 120 | 110 | 14 | Won Mann Cup (18th) |
| 2023 | Peterborough Lakers | 16 | 12 | 4 | 0 | 178 | 136 | 24 | Defeated in Ontario Finals |
| 2024 | Peterborough Lakers | 12 | 7 | 5 | 0 | 121 | 100 | 14 | Defeated in Ontario Finals |
| 2025 | Peterborough Lakers | 18 | 13 | 5 | 0 | 169 | 140 | 26 | Defeated in Ontario Finals |
| 2026 | Peterborough Lakers | 18 | 11 | 7 | 0 | 177 | 141 | 22 | Defeated in Ontario Finals |
| Total | 69 seasons (67 Sr. A, 2 Pro) | 1,464 | 943 | 488 | 29 | 18,099 | 14,055 | 1,915 | 18 Mann Cups |

== See also ==
- Peterborough Lakers Jr. A
- Pat Baker (lacrosse)
- Lloyd Wootton
