= Brad MacArthur =

Canadian lacrosse player

Personal information
- Nickname: BMac
- Nationality: Canadian
- Born: June 14, 1975 (age 51) Wallaceburg, Ontario
- Education: St. Andrews Presbyterian College (now St. Andrews University)
- Height: 6 ft 1 in (185 cm)
- Weight: 230 lb (100 kg; 16 st 6 lb)

Sport
- Position: Defense
- Shoots: Right
- NLL draft: 5th overall, 1998; Rochester Knighthawks
- NLL teams: Toronto Rock; Calgary Roughnecks; Montreal Express; Rochester Knighthawks
- Pro career: 1999–2007

Brad MacArthur (born June 14, 1975 in Wallaceburg, Ontario) is a former National Lacrosse League player. He was drafted in 1999 by the Rochester Knighthawks, two-time NLL finalists. Known for his faceoff prowess, MacArthur played a defender's role for the most part, although he had the ability to put the ball in the net. He played for seven seasons in the National Lacrosse League until his retirement prior to the 2008 NLL season. MacArthur was also the head coach of the 2002 Founders Cup champion Clarington Green Gaels.

== Statistics ==
=== NLL ===
		Regular Season						Playoffs
Season	Team	GP	G	A	Pts	LB	PIM	GP	G	A	Pts	LB	PIM
1999	Rochester	11	1	8	9	48	30	--	--	--	--	--	--
2000	Rochester	11	3	2	5	34	22	2	1	3	4	8	2
2001	Rochester	14	12	6	18	61	38	1	0	0	0	2	0
2002	Montreal	12	2	9	11	41	32	--	--	--	--	--	--
2003	Calgary	15	3	7	10	51	8	1	0	0	0	3	0
2004	Calgary	15	1	5	6	27	8	3	1	1	2	13	2
2007	Toronto	14	0	0	0	51	15	1	0	0	0	1	4
NLL totals		92	22	37	59	313	153	8	2	4	6	27	8
