= Vancouver Burrards =

Vancouver Burrards Senior Lacrosse Club has been the name of several lacrosse teams in Vancouver, British Columbia, Canada. Currently, the Club consists of three teams in Senior B, Senior C, and Intermediate B lacrosse; the Junior B team suspended operations for the 2007 season. There is no affiliation between the current Vancouver Burrards teams and the WLA Burrards now located in Maple Ridge.

Due to arena availability in the City of Vancouver leading up to the 2010 Winter Olympics, the Senior B Burrards were forced out of their home arena at Killarney Community Centre after the 2006 season and moved to the Burnaby Lake arena. This resulted in the 2007 season becoming the first lacrosse season since 1928 in which no senior men's summer lacrosse was played within the City of Vancouver.

== Senior A 1937–1993 ==
Former Senior 'A' team which joined the Inter-City Lacrosse League in 1937. The team played in the Western Lacrosse Association until 1993 when the team was transferred to Surrey. Two years later the Surrey Burrards moved to their current home in Maple Ridge.

During the team's existence in Vancouver, it underwent numerous name changes to reflect sponsorship and merging with other teams.

- 1937–1937 Vancouver Burrard Olympics
- 1938–1949 Vancouver Burrards
- 1950–1950 Vancouver Burrard Westerns
- 1951–1951 Vancouver Combines
- 1952–1958 Vancouver Pilseners
- 1959–1969 Vancouver Carlings
- 1970–1993 Vancouver Burrards

In the early days, the Vancouver Forum on the PNE grounds was used as the home arena until Kerrisdale Arena was built on the west side of the city in 1949. In May 1990, the Burrards left Kerrisdale Arena and moved to the PNE Agridome, playing there until departing for Surrey four seasons later.

=== Team record ===
Vancouver Burrards
Season	Team	GP	W	L	T	GF	GA	PTS
1937	Vancouver Burrard Olympics	28	8	20	0	355	457	16
1938	Vancouver Burrards	24	14	10	0	366	331	26
1939	Vancouver Burrards	24	19	5	0	398	276	38
1940	Vancouver Burrards	24	17	5	2	433	301	36
1941	Vancouver Burrards	24	17	7	0	362	291	34
1942	Vancouver Burrards	24	14	9	1	254	223	29
1943	Vancouver Burrards	18	10	8	0	245	216	20
1944	Vancouver Burrards	24	10	14	0	299	276	20
1945	Vancouver Burrards	24	20	4	0	404	278	40
1946	Vancouver Burrards	24	12	11	1	316	325	25
1947	Vancouver Burrards	24	15	8	1	357	315	31
1948	Vancouver Burrards	24	16	8	0	349	280	32
1949	Vancouver Burrards	16	9	7	0	217	186	18
1950	Vancouver Burrard Westerns	32	17	14	1	435	412	35
1951	Vancouver Combines	32	17	14	1	435	412	35
1952	Vancouver Pilseners	32	17	15	0	411	419	34
1953	Vancouver Pilseners	32	19	12	1	372	306	39
1954	Vancouver Pilseners	32	14	18	0	342	326	28
1955	Vancouver Pilseners	32	12	20	0	317	408	24
1956	Vancouver Pilseners	30	16	13	1	310	320	33
1957	Vancouver Pilseners	30	10	20	0	279	327	20
1958	Vancouver Pilseners	30	16	13	1	320	312	33
1959	Vancouver Carlings	30	15	14	1	309	287	31
1960	Vancouver Carlings	30	20	10	0	311	248	40
1961	Vancouver Carlings	30	19	9	2	371	266	40
1962	Vancouver Carlings	32	26	6	0	336	212	52
1963	Vancouver Carlings	30	22	7	1	326	249	45
1964	Vancouver Carlings	32	23	9	0	367	274	46
1965	Vancouver Carlings	30	20	10	0	313	261	40
1966	Vancouver Carlings	30	15	14	1	287	284	31
1967	Vancouver Carlings	30	16	12	2	291	264	34
1968	Vancouver Carlings	38	22	16	0	410	379	44
1969	Vancouver Carlings	29	9	20	0	276	369	18
1970	Vancouver Burrards	30	16	14	0	348	353	32
1971	Vancouver Burrards	31	12	18	1	355	396	25
1972	Vancouver Burrards	36	19	17	0	435	403	38
1973	Vancouver Burrards	25	17	8	0	348	283	34
1974	Vancouver Burrards	24	11	13	0	294	291	22
1975	Vancouver Burrards	24	14	10	0	322	308	28
1976	Vancouver Burrards	24	10	14	0	312	323	20
1977	Vancouver Burrards	24	16	7	1	303	303	33
1978	Vancouver Burrards	24	11	13	0	317	333	22
1979	Vancouver Burrards	30	11	19	0	373	435	22
1980	Vancouver Burrards	24	11	13	0	297	292	22
1981	Vancouver Burrards	24	12	12	0	294	286	24
1982	Vancouver Burrards	24	12	12	0	293	308	24
1983	Vancouver Burrards	24	14	10	0	276	260	28
1984	Vancouver Burrards	24	9	15	0	220	263	18
1985	Vancouver Burrards	24	11	13	0	204	238	22
1986	Vancouver Burrards	24	13	11	0	234	214	26
1987	Vancouver Burrards	24	10	14	0	258	263	20
1988	Vancouver Burrards	24	11	13	0	204	204	22
1989	Vancouver Burrards	24	9	15	0	221	241	18
1990	Vancouver Burrards	24	16	8	0	236	193	32
1991	Vancouver Burrards	24	8	16	0	187	251	16
1992	Vancouver Burrards	24	9	15	0	192	223	16
1993	Vancouver Burrards	24	4	20	0	220	312	8

== Senior B (1999-2007) ==
West Coast Senior Lacrosse Association (WCSLA) franchise from 1989 to 2007. Team moved to Burnaby prior to the start of the 2007 season and renamed Burnaby Burrards the following year.

Governors

- Terry Kirstiuk (2001–2007)
- Shawn Joinson (2008–present)

Managers

- Terry Kirstiuk (2001–2006)
- Shawn Joinson (2007–present)

Head coaches

- Dan Rodrigues (2001)
- Marc Olimpo (2002–2004)
- Dan Rodrigues (2005)
- Tony Delmonico (2007–2010)

Team Record

Vancouver Snr 'B' Burrards
Season	Team	GP	W	L	T/OL	GF	GA	PTS
1970	Killarney							
1971	South Vancouver Killarney	20	8	10	2	212	208	10
1972	Vancouver Sporting Club							
1973	unknown							
1974	suspended operations	-	-	-	-	-	-	-
1975	Vancouver Mr. Sport Hotel	18	3	14	1	119	210	7
1976	unknown							
1977	unknown							
1978	Vancouver Disco-Sports Angels	20	5	15	0	184	275	10
1979	Vancouver Disco-Sports Angels	20	7	13	0	199	242	14
1980	Vancouver Disco-Sports Angels							
1981	Vancouver Disco-Sports Angels	16	6	9	1	208	206	13
1982	Vancouver Disco-Sports Angels							
1983	Vancouver Disco-Sports Angels							
1984	East Vancouver	20	5	14	1	220	310	11
1985	East Vancouver Bluebirds	20	6	13	1	201	211	13
1986	Vancouver	20	4	16	0	168	211	8
1987	suspended operations	-	-	-	-	-	-	-
1988	suspended operations	-	-	-	-	-	-	-
1989	Vancouver	24	2	22	0	176	305	4
1990	Vancouver	21	7	14	0			14
1991	Vancouver	21	5	16	1			10
1992	Vancouver Burrards	21	2	18	1			5
1993	Vancouver-Killarney Vipers	21	6	11	4	176	207	16
1994	Vancouver Vipers	21	7	8	5	172	181	19
1995	Vancouver Vipers	18	1	16	1	110	189	3
1996	Vancouver Vipers	21	2	19	0	113		4
1997	Vancouver Vipers	21	0	21	0	117	250	0
1998	Vancouver Vipers	21	0	20	1	153	290	1
1999	Vancouver Burrards	21	2	19	0	107	276	4
2000	Vancouver Burrards	21	1	18	2	85	272	4
2001	Vancouver Burrards	21	1	18	2	141	240	4
2002	Vancouver Burrards	18	4	14	0	115	207	8
2003	Vancouver Burrards	18	7	10	1	124	171	15
2004	Vancouver Burrards	18	2	14	2	115	191	6
2005	Vancouver Burrards	18	3	14	1	96	201	7
2006	Vancouver Burrards	18	2	16	0	113	200	4
2007	Vancouver Burrards	18	3	13	2	131	197	8

== Senior C ==
West Central Lacrosse League (WCLL) franchise established in 2003 as the Vancouver Vipers. In October 2005 during the off-season, Vancouver's executive decided to rename the team the Burrards to keep in line with all other Vancouver box lacrosse teams from minor up through to senior level.

Team Executive

- Terry Kirstiuk (governor / team manager) 2003–2004, 2008–present
- Terry Kirstiuk (governor) 2005–2007
- Dave Stewart-Candy (team manager) 2005–2007

Team Record

Vancouver Snr 'C' Burrards
Season	Team	GP	W	L	T	OL	GF	GA	PTS	AS	PEN	PIM	PLACE
2003	Vancouver Vipers	12	0	12	0	0	49	141	0	-	-	-	4th
2004	Vancouver Vipers	12	1	11	0	0	57	143	2	69	54	168	4th
2005	Vancouver Vipers	12	5	4	2	1	84	83	13	109	56	152	3rd
2006	Vancouver Burrards	12	4	6	0	2	71	103	10	100	77	164	3rd
2007	Vancouver Burrards	12	3	8	0	1	88	118	7	106	86	202	5th

== Junior A ==
In 1948 Vancouver Burrards defeated the St. Catharines Athletics 3 games to 2 (13-17, 10–4, 10–9, 10–13, 12–10) for the Minto Cup, Canadian Junior National Championship.

== Junior B ==
Team Record

Vancouver Jnr 'B' Burrards
Season	Team	GP	W	L	T	GF	GA	PTS
2001	Vancouver Burrards	20	2	15	3	108	192	7
2002	Vancouver Burrards	20	1	19	0	95	278	2
2003	suspended operations	-	-	-	-	-	-	-
2004	Vancouver Burrards	18	7	11	0	112	188	14
2005	Vancouver Burrards	18	6	10	2	177	200	14
2006	Vancouver Burrards	16	5	9	2	146	160	12
2007	suspended operations	-	-	-	-	-	-	-

== Intermediate B ==
Team Record

Vancouver Int 'B' Burrards
Season	Team	GP	W	L	T	GF	GA	PTS
2001	suspended operations	-	-	-	-	-	-	-
2002	Vancouver Burrards	16	1	15	0			2
2003	Vancouver Burrards	21	10	11	0			20
2004	suspended operations	-	-	-	-	-	-	-
2005	suspended operations	-	-	-	-	-	-	-
2006	Vancouver Burrards	18	1	16	1			3
2007	Vancouver Burrards	21	0	21	0	96	254	0

== Retired numbers ==
The following players have had their jersey numbers retired by the WLA Burrards club. The Senior B and Senior C Burrards also pay respect to these numbers and avoid using them as well.

- 1 - Walt Lee
- 1 - Jack Green
- 2 - Don Hamilton
- 5 - John Cavallin
- 14 - Harry Buchanan
- 18 - Bill Chisholm
- 21 - Roy Cavallin
- 29 - Dave Evans
