= Victoria Shamrocks =

Professional box lacrosse team in British Columbia

- Founded: 1950
- History: Victoria Shamrocks; 1950–1981; Victoria Pay Less; 1982–1994; Victoria Shamrocks; 1995–present
- Home arena: The Q Centre
- City: Victoria, British Columbia
- Colours: Green, white
- Owner(s): Keycorp Sports and Entertainment
- GM: Chris Welch
- Head Coach: Bruce Alexander
- Mann Cups: 9 National Championships
- Division titles: 21 Provincial Championships
- Website: victoriashamrocks.com

The Victoria Shamrocks are a Senior A box lacrosse team, based in Victoria, British Columbia. The team competes in the 7-team Western Lacrosse Association (WLA).

The Shamrocks entered the former Inter-City Lacrosse League, which is now the WLA, in 1950. The team became known as the Victoria Pay Less in 1982 to reflect a major sponsorship by Pay Less Gas. The team readopted the Shamrocks name in 1995.

The Shamrocks have won the Mann Cup Canadian National Championship a total of 9 times; in 1955, 1957, 1979, 1983, 1997, 1999, 2003, 2005 and 2015, the tied 4th most. They have won a total of 21 Provincial Championships.

Some of the most prominent lacrosse players in the world have worn the green and white, including Jack Bionda, Rick Brown, Archie Browning, Fred "Whitey" Severson, Geordie Johnston, "Bobby" Monaghan, Kevin Alexander, both Paul and Gary Gait, and John Tavares. The Shamrocks home arena features a "Wall of Fame" where many players, coaches, trainers and managers who have been part of the team are recognized.

On September 16, 2005, the Victoria Shamrocks won their 8th Mann Cup, defeating the Peterborough Lakers 4 games to 2 in a classic, hard-fought series. Shamrocks' goaltender Anthony Cosmo was awarded the Mike Kelley Memorial Trophy as the series Most Valuable Player.

Almost 10 years later, on September 11, 2015, the Victoria Shamrocks won their 9th Mann Cup, once again defeating the Peterborough Lakers 4 games to 2 in another hard-fought series. Shamrocks' forward Corey Small was awarded the Mike Kelley Memorial Trophy as the series Most Valuable Player.

The Lakers and Shamrocks met again in 2019 in the national championship, and this time Peterborough got their revenge taking the series 4-1.

The Shamrocks returned to the Mann Cup in 2024, facing the defending champions Six Nations Chiefs. Despite going undefeated in the WLA season and only losing two games through the provincial playoffs, the Ontario champion Chiefs won handily 4 games to 1, denying Victoria their 10th cup and earning Six Nations their 8th. The Chiefs would tie the Shamrock's total the next year after defeating New Westminster.

Current Roster

Current WLA Scores and Stats

== All-time record ==
Season	Team name	Games	Win	Losses	Tie	GF	GA	Points	Playoffs
1950	Victoria Shamrocks	30	16	14	0	343	293	32	
1951	Victoria Shamrocks	32	23	8	1	390	289	47	
1952	Victoria Shamrocks	32	22	10	0	472	333	44	
1953	Victoria Shamrocks	32	22	10	0	407	319	44	Provincial Champion
1954	Victoria Shamrocks	32	25	7	0	383	279	50	Provincial Champion
1955	Victoria Shamrocks	32	20	10	2	372	282	42	Mann Cup Champion
1956	Victoria Shamrocks	30	15	14	1	345	334	31	
1957	Victoria Shamrocks	30	19	10	0	349	295	39	Mann Cup Champion
1958	Victoria Shamrocks	30	11	18	1	272	303	23	
1959	Victoria Shamrocks	30	12	17	1	283	298	25	
1960	Victoria Shamrocks	30	8	21	0	276	354	17	
1961	Victoria Shamrocks	30	2	27	1	229	409	5	
1962	Victoria Shamrocks	32	14	18	0	277	324	28	
1963	Victoria Shamrocks	30	10	19	1	251	307	21	
1964	Victoria Shamrocks	32	18	13	1	274	262	37	
1965	Victoria Shamrocks	30	7	23	0	229	301	14	
1966	Victoria Shamrocks	30	11	18	1	244	280	23	
1967	Victoria Shamrocks	30	15	14	1	264	266	31	
1968	Victoria Shamrocks	38	15	23	0	337	397	30	
1969	Victoria Shamrocks	29	4	25	0	244	409	8	
1970	Victoria Shamrocks	30	8	22	0	323	407	16	
1971	Victoria Shamrocks	31	9	22	0	332	437	18	
1972	Victoria Shamorcks	32	14	18	0	379	397	28	
1973	Victoria Shamorcks	25	11	14	0	299	309	22	
1974	Victoria Shamrocks	24	8	16	0	290	318	16	
1975	Victoria Shamrocks	24	16	8	0	351	269	32	
1976	Victoria Shamrocks	24	18	5	1	349	275	37	
1977	Victoria Shamrocks	24	16	8	0	327	271	32	
1978	Victoria Shamrocks	24	15	7	2	352	278	32	Provincial Champion
1979	Victoria Shamrocks	30	19	9	2	375	322	40	Mann Cup Champion
1980	Victoria Shamrocks	24	14	10	0	290	257	28	
1981	Victoria Shamrocks	24	11	11	2	294	297	24	
1982	Victoria Pay Less	24	11	13	0	273	287	22	
1983	Victoria Pay Less	24	11	13	0	276	298	22	Mann Cup Champion
1984	Victoria Pay Less	24	13	11	0	289	275	26	Provincial Champion
1985	Victoria Pay Less	24	12	12	0	225	230	24	
1986	Victoria Pay Less	24	14	10	0	253	232	28	
1987	Victoria Pay Less	24	8	16	0	194	265	16	
1988	Victoria Pay Less	24	12	12	0	212	212	24	
1989	Victoria Pay Less	24	12	12	0	245	250	24	
1990	Victoria Pay Less	24	11	13	0	195	226	22	
1991	Victoria Pay Less	24	11	13	0	225	225	22	
1992	Victoria Pay Less	24	10	14	0	200	217	20	
1993	Victoria Pay Less	23	9	14	0	235	249	18	
1994	Victoria Pay Less	20	14	6	0	249	191	28	
1995	Victoria Shamrocks	25	12	9	4	246	234	28	
1996	Victoria Shamrocks	20	10	9	1	213	210	21	Provincial Champion
1997	Victoria Shamrocks	20	12	8	0	203	179	24	Mann Cup Champion
1998	Victoria Shamrocks	25	20	5	0	277	206	40	
1999	Victoria Shamrocks	25	20	5	0	283	194	40	Mann Cup Champion
2000	Victoria Shamrocks	25	20	5	0	319	239	40	Provincial Champion
2001	Victoria Shamrocks	20	19	0	1	311	192	39	
2002	Victoria Shamrocks	20	16	3	1	287	202	33	Provincial Champion
2003	Victoria Shamrocks	20	15	5	0	283	215	30	Mann Cup Champion
2004	Victoria Shamrocks	20	18	2	0	250	143	36	Provincial Champion
2005	Victoria Shamrocks	18	14	4	0	230	167	28	Mann Cup Champion
2006	Victoria Shamrocks	18	15	3	0	215	160	30	Provincial Champion
2007	Victoria Shamrocks	18	5	12	1	187	195	11	
2008	Victoria Shamrocks	18	9	8	1	159	162	19	
2009	Victoria Shamrocks	18	14	3	1	255	171	29	
2010	Victoria Shamrocks	18	11	7	0	188	169	22	
2011	Victoria Shamrocks	18	10	6	2	182	180	22	
2012	Victoria Shamrocks	18	11	7	0	195	168	22	
2013	Victoria Shamrocks	18	11	7	0	199	161	22	Provincial Champion
2014	Victoria Shamrocks	18	14	2	2	176	124	30	Provincial Champion
2015	Victoria Shamrocks	18	14	4	0	217	139	28	Mann Cup Champion
2016	Victoria Shamrocks	18	14	4	0	214	154	28	
2017	Victoria Shamrocks	18	10	7	1	172	150	21	
2018	Victoria Shamrocks	18	12	6	0	196	162	24	
2019	Victoria Shamrocks	18	12	6	0	173	121	24	Provincial Champion
2022	Victoria Shamrocks	18	12	6	0	229	171	24	
2023	Victoria Shamrocks	18	10	7	1	173	157	21	
2024	Victoria Shamrocks	18	18	0	0	197	126	36	Provincial Champion
2025	Victoria Shamrocks	18	13	4	1	166	134	27	
2026	Victoria Shamrocks	18	15	2	0	201	107	32	
Total	75 seasons	1,824	1002	784	35	19,869	18,420	2,043	9 Mann Cups
