= Mann Cup =

Canadian senior men's box lacrosse trophy

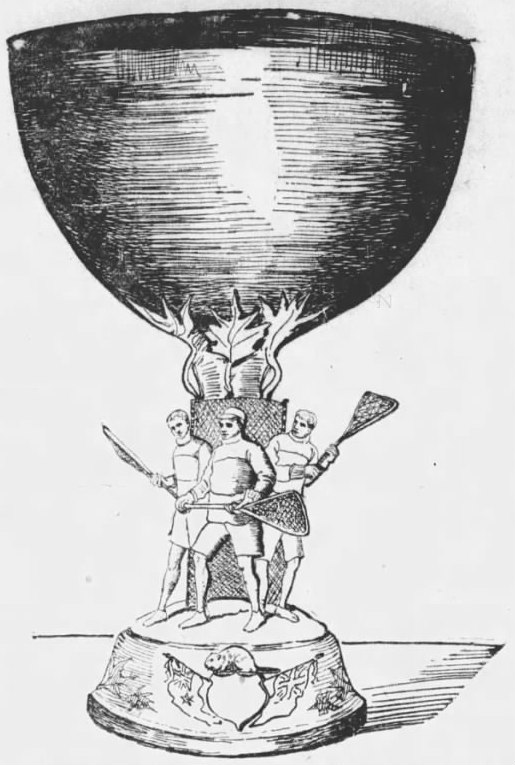
- Mann Cup depicted in Oct. 22, 1914 issue of Calgary Herald
- Sport: Box lacrosse
- Competition: Canadian Lacrosse Association
- Awarded for: Senior "A" men's national championship
- Country: Canada

History
- First award: 1910; 116 years ago
- Editions: 116 (Note: The Mann Cup has been awarded 116 times. The cup has only been played for 114 times as the cup went uncontested in 1916 and 1917 due to World War I, where the New Westminster Salmonbellies were awarded the title by acclamation due to them being the most recent cup holders. In 1922, the cup was awarded twice. The trophy was not awarded in 2020 or 2021 due to the COVID-19 pandemic.)
- First winner: Young Torontos
- Most wins: New Westminster Salmonbellies (24 titles)
- Most recent: Six Nations Chiefs (2026; 10th title)

The Mann Cup is the trophy awarded to the senior men's box lacrosse champions of Canada. The championship is a best-of-seven, East vs West series played between the league champions of Major Series Lacrosse, the East, and Western Lacrosse Association, the West.

The original trophy is now permanently located in the Canadian Lacrosse Hall of Fame. It is one of the most valuable in all of sports; made of solid, albeit low-karat, gold, the trophy was valued at CA$60,000 (equivalent to $223,909 in 2025) when appraised by Birks in May 1980.

== History ==
It was donated in 1910 by Sir Donald Mann; Prior to 1910, the Minto Cup was the senior amateur championship trophy. The Mann Cup was originally a challenge trophy, but in 1925 the champion New Westminster Salmonbellies turned the trophy over to the Canadian Lacrosse Association who instituted a national playoff system. The challenges and championships for the Mann Cup were played by the rules of traditional field lacrosse until 1932, when box lacrosse was adopted by the Canadian Lacrosse Association. The first indoor Mann Cup was played at Maple Leaf Gardens in Toronto in October 1932.

There have actually been three Mann Cup trophies in existence - the original and two replicas. The original 1910 trophy was in use from 1910 until 1985, when it was retired permanently to the Canadian Lacrosse Hall of Fame. A replica trophy, which has a larger and taller base than the original 1910 trophy, was in use and awarded to teams from 1986 until 2004 when it was destroyed in a bonfire mishap in Peterborough. The second replica replaced the first replica in 2005, and its appearance mirrors the previous 1986 replica trophy and not the original 1910 trophy.

=== Notable series ===
==== 1914 Calgary Chinooks dispute ====
In 1914, the Vancouver Athletic Club defeated the Calgary Chinooks and Brampton Excelsiors in Mann Cup challenge matches but the Mann Cup Trustees disputed the status of one of the Vancouver players in the series versus Brampton.

Despite the views of British Columbia lacrosse, national lacrosse and amateur athletic organisations that supported Vancouver's position, the trustees instead awarded the cup to the Calgary Chinooks on September 29, 1914. Vancouver however held on to the gold trophy and refused to turn it over to either the trustees or the Chinooks. Later that year, the Canadian Amateur Lacrosse Association overruled Mann Cup trustee Joseph Lally and awarded the cup to the Vancouver Athletic Club.

==== 1922 Vancouver Lacrosse Club ====
In 1922, there were two rival leagues located in British Columbia battling for the Mann Cup: Vancouver Lacrosse Club and Victoria Capitals played in the British Columbia Amateur Lacrosse Association's senior league while the New Westminster Salmonbellies and Vancouver Elks played in the Pacific Coast Amateur Lacrosse Association. Control of the Mann Cup was retained by the BCALA after New Westminster left that league to join the PCALA. Vancouver Lacrosse Club won their schedule and were awarded the Mann Cup, while New Westminster won their series in the PCALA.

Just over a month later, Vancouver Lacrosse Club and New Westminster met in a three-game, total goals series to determine who would take home the Mann and Kilmarnock Cups. After Vancouver (who were at the time considered the holders of the Mann Cup) were up 7–6 in goals after two games, they then defaulted their third game after a brawl broke out and the team refused to return to the field. The score was 1-1, so New Westminster lined up and they then went through the formal motions of scoring two unopposed goals into the empty net to take the series and the silverware back by 9 goals to 8.

==== 1963 Cornwall, Ontario series ====
In 1963, Cornwall, Ontario was named as host city for the Mann Cup despite having neither a senior lacrosse team nor participating in the Mann Cup. Local businessmen and lacrosse promoter Colin Chisholm were central in bringing the series to Cornwall and guaranteeing the $10,000 bond to host it.

The Western teams at that time were dominating play in Canada over their Eastern brethren, and had turned down their rights for hosting that year as they wanted the finals held in the East for successive back-to-back years to help stimulate and rejuvenate interest in the sport and the tournament. However, none of the then-current teams in the Ontario Lacrosse Association league had, or could raise, the $10,000 required by the host for the performance bond posted with the Canadian Lacrosse Association.

Officials in Cornwall stepped up and in August 1963 the city was awarded the hosting rights for the 1963 Mann Cup. When the CLA had issues getting officials, Stewart Begg age 16, stepped in to officiate

=== Cup mishaps ===
In 1989, the Mann Cup was stolen from the Canadian Lacrosse Hall of Fame in New Westminster, British Columbia. Despite fears of the cup being melted down for its gold content, it turned up a few weeks later, with a small chunk cut out of the rim, but otherwise intact.

Following the 1999 Mann Cup final, the cup broke during the post-game "victory lap" taken by the Victoria Shamrocks around Memorial Arena.

In 2004, the Peterborough Lakers won the Mann Cup. During a celebratory gathering the replica of the trophy was dropped in a bonfire and was destroyed.

== Champions ==
Year	Champion	Finalist(s)	Series	Series location(s)
Challenge cup (field lacrosse) era
1910	Toronto Young Torontos	Toronto Maitlands	7-0 single game	-
1911	Vancouver Athletic Club	Toronto Young Torontos	9-3 two-games total goals	-
1912	Vancouver Athletic Club	Winnipeg Canadian Northern Railroad	47-6 two-games total goals	-
1912	Vancouver Athletic Club	St. Catharines Athletics	34-1 two-games total goals	-
1913	Vancouver Athletic Club	Armstrong Red Apple Boys	25-3 two-games total goals	-
1913	Vancouver Athletic Club	Oak Bay	13-0 single-game	-
1914	Vancouver Athletic Club	Calgary Chinooks	17-2 two-games total goals	-
1914	Vancouver Athletic Club	Brampton Excelsiors	10-7 two-games total goals	-
1915	New Westminster Salmonbellies	none -	league play	-
1916	**New Westminster Salmonbellies	no competition due to First World War -	-	-
1917	**New Westminster Salmonbellies	no competition due to First World War -	-	-
1918	Vancouver Coughlans Shipyards	Winnipeg Argonauts	10-4 two-games total goals	-
1919	Victoria Foundation Shipyards	Winnipegs	17-7 single-game	-
1920	New Westminster Salmonbellies	Vancouver Athletic Club	league play	-
1921	New Westminster Salmonbellies	none -	league play	-
1922	Vancouver Lacrosse Club	Victoria Capitals	league play	-
1922	New Westminster Salmonbellies	Vancouver Lacrosse Club	9-8 two-games total goals	-
1923	New Westminster Salmonbellies	Victoria Capitals	8-4 two-games total goals	-
1924	New Westminster Salmonbellies	none -	league play	-
1925	New Westminster Salmonbellies	Vancouver Indians	league play	-
National playoff (field lacrosse) era begins
1926	Weston Westonmen	Winnipeg Tammany Tigers	22-6 two-games total goals	Winnipeg, Manitoba
1927	New Westminster Salmonbellies	Weston Westonmen	2 games to 0	New Westminster, British Columbia
1928	Ottawa Emmetts	Winnipeg Wellingtons	2 games to 1 plus 1 tie	Ottawa (Landsowne Park), Ontario
1929	Oshawa General Motors	New Westminster Salmonbellies	2 games to 0	New Westminster, British Columbia
1930	Brampton Excelsiors	New Westminster Salmonbellies	2 games to 1	Toronto (Varsity Stadium), Ontario
1931	Brampton Excelsiors	New Westminster Salmonbellies	2 games to 1	New Westminster, British Columbia
National playoff (box lacrosse) era begins
1932	Mimico Mountaineers	Winnipeg Argonauts	2 games to 0	Toronto (Maple Leaf Gardens), Ontario
1933	Hamilton Tigers	New Westminster Salmonbellies	3 games to 2	New Westminster, British Columbia
1934	Orillia Terriers	New Westminster Salmonbellies	3 games to 0	Barrie, Ontario
1935	Orillia Terriers	Richmond Farmers	3 games to 0	Vancouver (Denman Arena), British Columbia
1936	Orillia Terriers	North Shore Indians	3 games to 1	Toronto (Maple Leaf Gardens), Ontario
1937	New Westminster Salmonbellies	Orillia Terriers	3 games to 0	New Westminster, British Columbia
1938	St. Catharines Athletics	New Westminster Adanacs	3 games to 0	Toronto (Maple Leaf Gardens), Ontario
1939	New Westminster Adanacs	St. Catharines Athletics	3 games to 0	New Westminster / Vancouver (PNE Forum), British Columbia
1940	St. Catharines Athletics	Vancouver Burrards	3 games to 1	Toronto (Maple Leaf Gardens), Ontario
1941	St. Catharines Athletics	Richmond Farmers	3 games to 2	New Westminster, British Columbia
1942	Mimico-Brampton Combines	New Westminster Salmonbellies	3 games to 1	Toronto (Maple Leaf Gardens), Ontario
1943	New Westminster Salmonbellies	Mimico-Brampton Combines	3 games to 1	New Westminster, British Columbia
1944	St. Catharines Athletics	New Westminster Salmonbellies	3 games to 2	Toronto (Maple Leaf Gardens), Ontario
1945	Vancouver Burrards	St. Catharines Athletics	3 games to 0	Vancouver (PNE Forum), British Columbia
1946	St. Catharines Athletics	New Westminster Salmonbellies	3 games to 0	Toronto (Maple Leaf Gardens), Ontario
1947	New Westminster Adanacs	Mimico Mountaineers	3 games to 0	Vancouver (PNE Forum), British Columbia
1948	Hamilton Tigers	New Westminster Adanacs	3 games to 2	Toronto (Maple Leaf Gardens), Ontario
1949	Vancouver Burrards	Hamilton Tigers	3 games to 1	Vancouver (PNE Forum), British Columbia
1950	Owen Sound Crescents	New Westminster Adanacs	4 games to 3	Toronto (Maple Leaf Gardens), Ontario
1951	Peterborough Timbermen	Vancouver Combines	4 games to 3	Vancouver (PNE Forum / Kerrisdale) / Victoria, British Columbia
1952	Peterborough Timbermen	Vancouver Pilseners	4 games to 0	Toronto (Maple Leaf Gardens), Ontario
1953	Peterborough Trailermen	Victoria Shamrocks	4 games to 1	Victoria, British Columbia
1954	Peterborough Trailermen	Victoria Shamrocks	4 games to 1	Peterborough (Miller Bowl), Ontario
1955	Victoria Shamrocks	Peterborough Trailermen	4 games to 1	Victoria, British Columbia
1956	Nanaimo Timbermen	Peterborough Trailermen	4 games to 1	Toronto (Maple Leaf Gardens), Ontario
1957	Victoria Shamrocks	Long Branch Pontiacs	4 games to 0	Victoria, British Columbia
1958	New Westminster Salmonbellies	Welland-Crowland Switsons	4 games to 0	New Westminster, British Columbia
1959	New Westminster O’Keefes	Peterborough Mercurys	4 games to 0	New Westminster, British Columbia
1960	Port Credit Sailors	Nanaimo Labatts	4 games to 1	Port Credit, Ontario
1961	Vancouver Carlings	Brampton Ramblers	4 games to 0	Vancouver (Kerrisdale), British Columbia
1962	New Westminster O’Keefes	Brampton Ramblers	4 games to 0	Brampton, Ontario
1963	Vancouver Carlings	St. Catharines Athletics	4 games to 2	Cornwall, Ontario
1964	Vancouver Carlings	Brooklin Merchants	4 games to 3	Whitby, Ontario
1965	New Westminster O’Keefes	Brooklin Merchants	4 games to 3	New Westminster, British Columbia
1966	Peterborough Lakers	Vancouver Carlings	4 games to 1	Peterborough, Ontario
1967	Vancouver Carlings	Brooklin Redmen	4 games to 2	Vancouver (Kerrisdale), British Columbia
1968	Brooklin Redmen	Nanaimo Luckies	4 games to 0	Whitby, Ontario
1969	Brooklin Redmen	New Westminster Blues	4 games to 1	New Westminster / North Vancouver, British Columbia
1970	New Westminster Salmonbellies	Peterborough Lakers	4 games to 0	New Westminster / Coquitlam, British Columbia
1971	Brantford Warriors	New Westminster Salmonbellies	4 games to 0	Brantford, Ontario
1972	New Westminster Salmonbellies	Brantford Warriors	4 games to 0	New Westminster, British Columbia
1973	Peterborough Lakers	Vancouver Burrards	9-5 (single game)	Brantford, Ontario
1974	New Westminster Salmonbellies	Windsor Warlocks	18-5 (single game)	New Westminster, British Columbia
1975	Vancouver Burrards	Brampton Excelsiors	2 games to 0	Vancouver (PNE Forum), British Columbia
1976	New Westminster Salmonbellies	Brampton Excelsiors	4 games to 3	Brampton, Ontario
1977	Vancouver Burrards	Brampton Excelsiors	4 games to 2	Vancouver (Kerrisdale), British Columbia
1978	Peterborough Red Oaks	Victoria Shamrocks	4 games to 3	Peterborough, Ontario
1979	Victoria Shamrocks	Peterborough Red Oaks	4 games to 0	Victoria, British Columbia
1980	Brampton Excelsiors	New Westminster Salmonbellies	4 games to 1	Brampton, Ontario
1981	New Westminster Salmonbellies	Brampton Excelsiors	4 games to 0	New Westminster, British Columbia
1982	Peterborough Lakers	New Westminster Salmonbellies	4 games to 2	Peterborough, Ontario
1983	Victoria Payless	Peterborough Lakers	4 games to 2	Victoria, British Columbia
1984	Peterborough Lakers	Victoria Payless	4 games to 1	Peterborough, Ontario
1985	Brooklin Redmen	New Westminster Salmonbellies	4 games to 3	New Westminster, British Columbia
1986	New Westminster Salmonbellies	Brooklin Redmen	4 games to 2	Whitby, Ontario
1987	Brooklin Redmen	New Westminster Salmonbellies	4 games to 3	New Westminster, British Columbia
1988	Brooklin Redmen	Coquitlam Adanacs	4 games to 2	Whitby, Ontario
1989	New Westminster Salmonbellies	Brooklin Redmen	4 games to 2	New Westminster, British Columbia
1990	Brooklin Redmen	Vancouver Burrards	4 games to 0	Whitby, Ontario
1991	New Westminster Salmonbellies	Brooklin Redmen	4 games to 0	New Westminster, British Columbia
1992	Brampton Excelsiors	New Westminster Salmonbellies	4 games to 1	Brampton, Ontario
1993	Brampton Excelsiors	Coquitlam Adanacs	4 games to 1	Coquitlam, British Columbia
1994	Six Nations Chiefs	New Westminster Salmonbellies	4 games to 2	Brantford, Ontario
1995	Six Nations Chiefs	New Westminster Salmonbellies	4 games to 2	New Westminster, British Columbia
1996	Six Nations Chiefs	Victoria Shamrocks	4 games to 0	Brantford, Ontario
1997	Victoria Shamrocks	Niagara Falls Gamblers	4 games to 1	Victoria, British Columbia
1998	Brampton Excelsiors	Coquitlam Adanacs	4 games to 2	Brampton, Ontario
1999	Victoria Shamrocks	Brampton Excelsiors	4 games to 0	Victoria, British Columbia
2000	Brooklin Redmen	Victoria Shamrocks	4 games to 0	Whitby, Ontario
2001	Coquitlam Adanacs	Brampton Excelsiors	4 games to 3	Vancouver (Pacific Coliseum), British Columbia
2002	Brampton Excelsiors	Victoria Shamrocks	4 games to 3	Brampton, Ontario
2003	Victoria Shamrocks	Brampton Excelsiors	4 games to 1	Victoria, British Columbia
2004	Peterborough Lakers	Victoria Shamrocks	4 games to 2	Peterborough, Ontario
2005	Victoria Shamrocks	Peterborough Lakers	4 games to 2	Victoria, British Columbia
2006	Peterborough Lakers	Victoria Shamrocks	4 games to 1	Peterborough, Ontario
2007	Peterborough Lakers	Coquitlam Adanacs	4 games to 2	Coquitlam, British Columbia
2008	Brampton Excelsiors	New Westminster Salmonbellies	4 games to 0	Brampton, Ontario
2009	Brampton Excelsiors	New Westminster Salmonbellies	4 games to 3	New Westminster, British Columbia
2010	Peterborough Lakers	New Westminster Salmonbellies	4 games to 2	Peterborough, Ontario
2011	Brampton Excelsiors	Langley Thunder	4 games to 1	Langley, British Columbia
2012	Peterborough Lakers	Langley Thunder	4 games to 2	Peterborough, Ontario
2013	Six Nations Chiefs	Victoria Shamrocks	4 games to 2	Victoria, British Columbia
2014	Six Nations Chiefs	Victoria Shamrocks	4 games to 2	Hagersville, Ontario
2015	Victoria Shamrocks	Peterborough Lakers	4 games to 2	Victoria, British Columbia
2016	Six Nations Chiefs	Maple Ridge Burrards	4 games to 1	Ohsweken, Ontario
2017	Peterborough Lakers	New Westminster Salmonbellies	4 games to 2	New Westminster, British Columbia
2018	Peterborough Lakers	Maple Ridge Burrards	4 games to 0	Peterborough, Ontario
2019	Peterborough Lakers	Victoria Shamrocks	4 games to 1	Victoria, British Columbia
2020	No competition due to COVID-19 pandemic			
2021	No competition due to COVID-19 pandemic			
2022	Peterborough Lakers	Langley Thunder	4 games to 3	Peterborough, Ontario
2023	Six Nations Chiefs	New Westminster Salmonbellies	4 games to 1	New Westminster, British Columbia
2024	Six Nations Chiefs	Victoria Shamrocks	4 games to 1	Hagersville, Ontario
2025	Six Nations Chiefs	New Westminster Salmonbellies	4 games to 3	New Westminster, British Columbia
2026	Six Nations Chiefs	Coquitlam Adanacs	4 games to 0	Hagersville, Ontario

== Records ==
Team	Wins	Championship years	Runners-up	Runner-up years
New Westminster Salmonbellies/New Westminster O’Keefes/New Westminster Blues	24	1915, 1916, 1917, 1920, 1921, 1922, 1923, 1924, 1925, 1927, 1937, 1943, 1958, 1959, 1962, 1965, 1970, 1972, 1974, 1976, 1981, 1986, 1989, 1991	22	1929, 1930, 1931, 1933, 1934, 1942, 1944, 1946, 1969, 1971, 1980, 1982, 1985, 1987, 1992, 1994, 1995, 2008, 2009, 2010, 2017, 2023, 2025
Peterborough Timbermen/Peterborough Trailermen/Peterborough Mercurys/Peterborough Lakers/Peterborough Red Oaks	18	1951, 1952, 1953, 1954, 1966, 1973, 1978, 1982, 1984, 2004, 2006, 2007, 2010, 2012, 2017, 2018, 2019, 2022	8	1955, 1956, 1959, 1970, 1979, 1983, 2005, 2015
Brampton Excelsiors/Mimico-Brampton Combines	11	1930, 1931, 1942, 1980, 1992, 1993, 1998, 2002, 2008, 2009, 2011	11	1914, 1943, 1961, 1962, 1975, 1976, 1977, 1981, 1999, 2001, 2003
Six Nations Chiefs	10	1994, 1995, 1996, 2013, 2014, 2016, 2023, 2024, 2025, 2026	0	—
Victoria Shamrocks/Victoria Payless	9	1955, 1957, 1979, 1983, 1997, 1999, 2003, 2005, 2015	13	1953, 1954, 1978, 1984, 1996, 2000, 2002, 2004, 2006, 2013, 2014, 2019, 2024
Vancouver Burrards/Vancouver Combines/Vancouver Carlings/Maple Ridge Burrards	8	1945, 1949, 1961, 1963, 1964, 1967, 1975, 1977	6	1940, 1951, 1973, 1990, 2016, 2018
Brooklin Merchants/Brooklin Redmen	7	1968, 1969, 1985, 1987, 1988, 1990, 2000	6	1964, 1965, 1967, 1986, 1989, 1991
St. Catharines Athletics/Welland-Crowland Switsons	5	1938, 1940, 1941, 1944, 1946	4	1912, 1939, 1945, 1958, 1963
Vancouver Athletic Club	4	1911, 1912, 1913, 1914	1	1920
Orillia Terriers	3	1934, 1935, 1936	1	1937
New Westminster Adanacs	2	1939, 1947	3	1938, 1948, 1950
Hamilton Tigers	2	1933, 1948	1	1949
Coquitlam Adanacs	1	2001	4	1988, 1993, 1998, 2007
Toronto Young Torontos	1	1910	1	1911
Weston Westonmen	1	1926	1	1927
Mimico Mountaineers	1	1932	1	1947
Brantford Warriors	1	1971	1	1972
Vancouver Coughlans Shipyards	1	1918	0	—
Victoria Foundation Shipyards	1	1919	0	—
Ottawa Emmetts	1	1928	0	—
Oshawa General Motors	1	1929	0	—
Owen Sound Crescents	1	1950	0	—
Nanaimo Timbermen	1	1956	0	—
Port Credit Sailors	1	1960	0	—
Langley Thunder	0	—	3	2011, 2012, 2022
Victoria Capitals	0	—	2	1922, 1923
Winnipeg Argonauts	0	—	2	1918, 1932
Richmond Farmers	0	—	2	1935, 1941
Toronto Maitlands	0	—	1	1910
Winnipeg Canadian Northern Railroad	0	—	1	1912
Armstrong Red Apple Boys	0	—	1	1913
Oak Bay	0	—	1	1913
Calgary Chinooks	0	—	1	1914
Winnipegs	0	—	1	1919
Vancouver Lacrosse Club	0	—	1	1922
Vancouver Indians	0	—	1	1925
Winnipeg Tammany Tigers	0	—	1	1926
Winnipeg Wellingtons	0	—	1	1928
North Shore Indians	0	—	1	1936
Vancouver Pilseners	0	—	1	1952
Long Branch Pontiacs	0	—	1	1957
Nanaimo Labatts	0	—	1	1960
Vancouver Carlings	0	—	1	1966
Nanaimo Luckies	0	—	1	1968
Windsor Warlocks	0	—	1	1974
Niagara Falls Gamblers	0	—	1	1997

=== Titles by location ===
Results from 1926 onwards (national playoff era), current teams only

As of the 2025 season

Team	League	Home wins	Away wins
Brampton Excelsiors	MSL	7	4
Brooklin Lacrosse Club	MSL	4	3
Coquitlam Adanacs	WLA	3	0
Maple Ridge Burrards	WLA	6	2
Nanaimo Timbermen	WLA	0	1
New Westminster Salmonbellies	WLA	12	3
Peterborough Lakers	MSL	13	5
Six Nations Chiefs	MSL	6	4
Victoria Shamrocks	WLA	9	0

== See also ==
- Mike Kelley Memorial Trophy – Mann Cup MVP award.
