= Brampton Excelsiors (MSL) =

Box lacrosse team from Brampton, Ontario, Canada

- Sport: Box lacrosse
- Founded: 1883; 143 years ago
- League: Major Series Lacrosse
- Team history: Brampton Excelsiors (1883–1941); Mimico-Brampton Combines (1942–43); Brampton Excelsiors (1944); Brampton-Lakeshore Combines (1945); Brampton Excelsiors (1946–1960); Brampton Ramblers (1961–62); Brampton Sealtests (1963–64); Brampton Excelsiors (1965–1968); Bramalea Excelsiors (1969); Brampton Excelsiors (1970–present)
- Based in: Brampton, Ontario
- Arena: Memorial Arena
- Colours: maroon, yellow, white
- Head coach: Dan Teat
- General manager: Keith Slinger
- Championships: 1930, 1931, 1942, 1980, 1992, 1993, 1998, 2002, 2008, 2009, 2011
- Website: bramptonexcelsiors.ca

The Brampton Excelsiors are a Senior "A" box lacrosse team from Brampton, Ontario, Canada. The Excelsiors play in the Major Series Lacrosse Senior "A" Lacrosse League.

== History ==
Perkins Bull, author of "From Rattlesnake Hunt To Hockey: The History of Sports in Canada and of the Sportsmen of Peel, 1798 to 1934", wrote that while it was Harry W. Dawson who brought "the first stick into Brampton," the "first regular play began in 1871" when George M. Lee, second Master in the Brampton High School, initiated the first organized game. At Lee's suggestion it is reported that the "Excelsior" name from Longfellow's poem was introduced and the legend was set in motion.

The Brampton Excelsiors are a club operated by the Brampton Excelsior Lacrosse Club, founded in 1870, making it the oldest sports organization in North America.

In 1974, the Brampton Excelsior Lacrosse Club Executive recognized 1883 as the official date for the establishment of the Major Excelsior Lacrosse Club. This year was selected given its solidification as a community organization and its entry into the newly established provincial lacrosse champions' schedule.

== Season-by-season results ==
Note: GP = Games played, W = Wins, L = Losses, T = Ties, Pts = Points, GF = Goals for, GA = Goals against

Season	GP	W	L	T	GF	GA	PTS	Placing	Playoffs
1913	-	-	-	-	-	-	-	1st OALA Sr A West	Won League
1914	8	6	2	0	85	41	12	1st OALA Sr A West	Won League
1915-1918 - Team folded for World War I.
1919	8	6	2	0	-	-	12	2nd OALA Sr A	Lost final by Default
1920	9	6	2	1	64	36	13	1st OALA Sr A	Lost final
1921	12	3	8	1	47	69	6	3rd OALA Sr A II	DNQ
1922	12	9	3	0	72	35	18	2nd OALA Sr A I	DNQ
1923	16	14	2	0	97	49	28	1st OALA Sr A	Lost final
1924	12	10	2	0	84	43	20	1st OALA Sr A I	Lost Division Final
1925	20	13	7	0	129	114	26	2nd OALA Sr A	Lost final
1926	16	11	5	0	105	75	22	2nd OALA Sr A	Won League
1927	9	6	3	0	55	41	12	3rd OALA Sr A	Lost final
1928	20	15	5	0	141	80	30	1st OALA Sr A	Lost final
1929	10	9	1	0	66	30	18	1st OALA Sr A	Lost final
1930	11	7	3	1	41	39	15	1st OALA Sr A	Won League, won Mann Cup
1931	10	6	4	0	57	39	12	3rd OALA Sr A	Won League, won Mann Cup
1932	19	9	10	0	167	173	18	4th OLA Sr A I	DNQ
1933	16	1	15	0	52	99	2	5th OLA Sr A I	DNQ
1934	Did Not Play								
1935	23	14	9	0	215	175	28	2nd OLA Sr A II	Lost Group Final
1936	28	14	14	0	253	201	28	4th OLA Sr A II	DNQ
1937	24	11	13	0	280	249	22	5th OLA Sr A	Lost quarter-final
1938	28	16	12	0	282	292	32	4th OLA Sr A	Lost semi-final
1939	30	4	26	0	300	444	8	6th OLA Sr A	DNQ
1940	30	15	15	0	336	360	30	5th OLA Sr A	Lost final
1941	24	10	14	0	263	281	20	4th OLA Sr A	Lost quarter-final
1942	24	13	9	2	299	267	28	1st OLA Sr A	Won League, won Mann Cup
1943	24	17	7	0	318	268	34	1st OLA Sr A	Won League
1944	16	9	7	0	239	229	18	3rd OLA Sr A	Lost semi-final
1945	24	19	5	0	348	267	38	1st OLA Sr A	Lost semi-final
1946	30	7	23	0	357	546	12	6th OLA Sr A	Lost quarter-final
1947	30	8	22	0	295	423	16	5th OLA Sr A	Lost semi-final
1948	30	10	19	1	321	288	21	5th OLA Sr A	Lost semi-final
1949	36	26	10	0	494	380	56	1st OLA Sr A	Lost final
1950	28	16	12	0	376	277	32	4th OLA Sr A	Lost quarter-final
1951	30	10	19	1	301	366	21	5th OLA Sr A	Lost quarter-final
1952	Did Not Play								
1953	12	3	9	0	146	205	6	6th OLA Sr A	Folded
1954-1957 - Did Not Play
1958	24	18	6	0	251	204	32	2nd OLA Sr A	Lost final
1959	23	7	16	0	212	240	14	4th OLA Sr A	Lost final
1960	24	11	13	0	218	228	22	3rd OLA Sr A	Lost semi-final
1961	24	16	8	0	220	181	32	2nd OLA Sr A	Won League
1962	24	19	5	0	262	174	38	1st OLA Sr A	Won League
1963	24	8	16	0	193	244	19	4th OLA Sr A	Lost semi-final
1964	24	15	9	0	271	236	30	2nd OLA Sr A	Lost final
1965	24	16	8	0	310	231	32	2nd OLA Sr A	Lost final
1966	21	11	8	2	189	184	24	2nd OLA Sr A	Lost final
1967	24	9	14	1	197	226	19	3rd OLA Sr A	Lost final
1968	23	8	15	0	240	320	16	4th OLA Sr A	Lost final
1969	24	7	16	1	264	404	15	4th OLA Sr A	Lost final
1970	24	5	19	0	282	377	10	5th OLA Sr A	DNQ
1971	32	14	18	0	446	499	28	4th OLA Sr A	Lost semi-final
1972	Did Not Play								
1973	24	11	13	0	325	326	22	3rd OLA Major	Lost semi-final
1974	Did Not Play								
1975	24	15	9	0	370	279	30	1st OLA Major	Won League
1976	24	11	13	0	360	342	22	4th OLA Major	Won League
1977	24	17	7	0	350	282	34	2nd OLA Major	Won League
1978	24	7	17	0	307	341	14	6th OLA Major	DNQ
1979	24	14	9	1	341	272	29	3rd OLA Major	Lost final
1980	24	7	16	0	282	365	14	4th OLA Major	Won League, won Mann Cup
1981	24	13	10	1	279	257	27	3rd OLA Major	Won League
1982	24	8	16	0	279	302	16	5th OLA Major	DNQ
1983	24	8	16	0	242	303	16	5th OLA Major	DNQ
1984	24	11	13	0	330	331	22	4th OLA Major	Lost quarter-final
1985	20	9	11	0	249	278	18	4th OLA Major	Lost semi-final
1986	12	2	10	0	88	174	4	3rd OLA Major	Lost round robin
1987	Did Not Play								
1988	20	4	16	0	134	281	8	8th OLA Major	Lost round robin
1989	20	2	18	0	178	298	4	6th OLA Major	Lost round robin
1990	20	5	15	0	179	219	10	4th OLA Major	Lost round robin
1991	16	8	8	0	157	160	16	3rd OLA Major	Lost final
1992	16	16	0	0	230	140	32	1st OLA Major	Won League, won Mann Cup
1993	16	15	1	0	237	144	30	1st OLA Major	Won League, won Mann Cup
1994	20	13	6	1	224	175	27	3rd OLA Major	Lost semi-final
1995	20	11	7	2	205	172	24	3rd OLA Major	Lost semi-final
1996	24	14	9	1	281	244	29	2nd OLA Major	Lost final
1997	20	15	5	0	205	161	30	2nd OLA Major	Lost final
1998	18	16	2	0	209	102	32	1st OLA Major	Won League, won Mann Cup
1999	18	9	9	0	161	141	18	4th OLA Major	Won League
2000	18	11	7	0	227	155	22	3rd OLA Major	Lost final
2001	20	15	5	0	234	200	30	2nd OLA Major	Won League
2002	20	17	3	0	267	151	34	1st OLA Major	Won League, won Mann Cup
2003	14	8	6	0	160	153	16	4th OLA Major	Won League
2004	18	11	7	0	243	160	22	4th OLA Major	Lost final
2005	17	11	5	1	188	156	23	2nd OLA Major	Lost final
2006	18	13	3	2	211	162	28	1st OLA Major	Lost final
2007	18	11	6	1	158	135	23	3rd OLA Major	Lost final
2008	18	14	3	1	192	128	29	1st OLA Major	Won League, won Mann Cup
2009	18	13	5	0	197	125	26	1st OLA Major	Won League, won Mann Cup
2010	16	11	5	0	166	135	22	2nd OLA Major	Lost final
2011	20	12	8	0	171	164	24	3rd OLA Major	Won League, won Mann Cup
2012	14	7	7	0	93	127	14	4th OLA Major	Lost semi-final
2013	20	5	15	0	146	219	10	5th OLA Major	DNQ
2014	18	5	13	0	124	182	10	6th OLA Major	DNQ
2015	18	7	11	0	145	186	14	4th OLA Major	Lost semi-final
2016	18	3	15	0	123	180	6	5th OLA Major	DNQ
2017	18	4	12	2	176	229	10	5th OLA Major	DNQ
2018	16	5	9	2	165	186	12	5th OLA Major	DNQ
2019	18	9	9	0	165	178	18	4th OLA Major	Lost semi-final
2023	16	3	13	0	117	175	6	6th OLA Major	DNQ
2024	12	2	10	0	71	116	4	7th OLA Major	Lost quarter-final
2025	17	3	14	0	131	148	6	7th OLA Major	DNQ
2026	18	3	15	0	132	212	6	6th OLA Major	DNQ

== Championships ==
OALA Senior "A" League Title: 1912, 1913, 1914, 1926, 1930, 1931
Senior "A" League Title: 1942, 1943, 1961, 1962
MSL League Title: 1975, 1976, 1977, 1980, 1981, 1992, 1993, 1998, 1999, 2001, 2002, 2003, 2008, 2009, 2011
Mann Cup: 1930, 1931, 1942, 1980, 1992, 1993, 1998, 2002, 2008, 2009, 2011
