= Six Nations Chiefs =

Canadian lacrosse team

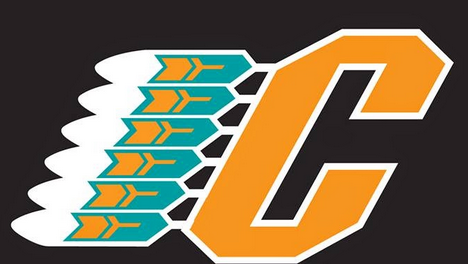
- Founded: 1993
- League: Major Series Lacrosse
- Based in: Ohsweken, Ontario
- Stadium: Iroquois Lacrosse Arena
- Head coach: John Tavares
- Captain: Cody Jamieson
- League titles: 10 (1994, 1995, 1996, 2013, 2014, 2016, 2023, 2024, 2025, 2026)
- Mann Cups: 10 (1994, 1995, 1996, 2013, 2014, 2016, 2023, 2024, 2025, 2026)

The Six Nations Chiefs are Canadian Senior box lacrosse team from Six Nations of the Grand River. The Chiefs play in the Major Series Lacrosse of the Ontario Lacrosse Association. The Chiefs are ten-time Mann Cup National Senior Champions.

== History ==
The Chiefs won the Mann Cup Canadian National Senior Championship in 1994, 1995, 1996, 2013, 2014, 2016, 2023, 2024, 2025, and 2026.

The Chiefs have an intense rivalry with the Peterborough Lakers.

== Season-by-season results ==
Season	GP	W	L	T	GF	GA	PTS	Results	Playoffs
1993	16	1	14	1	152	245	3	6th MSL	Did Not Qualify
1994	20	14	5	1	264	170	29	2nd MSL	Won League, Won Mann Cup
1995	20	19	1	0	294	156	38	1st MSL	Won League, Won Mann Cup
1996	24	17	6	1	320	239	35	1st MSL	Won League, Won Mann Cup
1997	20	7	13	0	207	200	14	3rd MSL	Lost Semifinal
1998	18	7	11	0	186	206	14	6th MSL	Did Not Qualify
1999	18	7	10	1	163	166	15	5th MSL	Lost Quarterfinal
2000	18	6	12	0	182	290	12	5th MSL	Did Not Qualify
2001	20	7	13	0	189	231	14	5th MSL	Did Not Qualify
2002	20	5	15	0	192	264	10	5th MSL	Did Not Qualify
2003	14	4	10	0	132	169	8	5th MSL	Lost Quarterfinal
2004	18	12	5	1	230	191	25	3rd MSL	Lost Semifinal
2005	18	9	9	0	197	205	18	4th MSL	Lost Semifinal
2006	18	5	13	0	149	198	10	7th MSL	Did Not Qualify
2007	18	8	10	0	189	197	16	5th MSL	Lost Quarterfinal
2008	18	5	12	1	172	202	11	6th MSL	Lost Quarterfinal
2009	18	13	5	0	203	143	26	2nd MSL	Lost Semifinal
2010	17	11	6	0	176	149	22	3rd MSL	Lost Semifinal
2011	20	12	8	0	186	161	24	4th MSL	Lost Semifinal
2012	14	9	4	1	134	105	19	2nd MSL	Lost Final
2013	20	16	3	1	218	157	33	1st MSL	Won League, Won Mann Cup
2014	18	9	9	0	136	136	18	4th MSL	Won League, Won Mann Cup
2015	18	15	3	0	217	135	30	1st MSL	Lost Final
2016	18	11	5	2	173	137	24	3rd MSL	Won League, Won Mann Cup
2017	18	14	3	1	205	146	29	2nd MSL	Lost Final
2018	16	8	7	1	147	136	17	3rd MSL	Lost Semifinal
2019	18	11	7	0	172	153	22	2nd MSL	Lost Final
2022	12	8	3	1	114	98	17	1st MSL	Lost Final
2023	16	14	2	0	178	121	32	1st MSL	Won League, Won Mann Cup
2024	11	11	0	0	135	55	22	1st MSL	Won League, Won Mann Cup
2025	18	16	2	0	191	105	32	1st MSL	Won League, Won Mann Cup
2026	18	16	2	0	211	94	32	1st MSL	Won League, Won Mann Cup
Total	568	327	228	13	6,014	5,360	671	32 Seasons	10 Mann Cups

== See also ==
- Six Nations Slash - Senior B
- Six Nations Rivermen - Senior B
- Six Nations Arrows - an affiliated Junior "A" box lacrosse team.
- Six Nations Rebels - Junior B
