= List of people from Windsor, Ontario =

This is a list of people from Windsor, Ontario. This list includes people from the Windsor-Essex County area (Amherstburg, Essex, Kingsville, Lakeshore, LaSalle, Leamington, Tecumseh, and Windsor).

== A ==
- Fouad Abiad (born 1978), bodybuilder
- Meghan Agosta (born 1987), Canadian Women's Hockey League (CWHL) player and Olympic medalist
- Ian Allison (1909–1990), Olympic silver medalist in basketball (1936)
- Frank André (1927–1999), Hall of Fame auto racing driver
- Glen Angus (1970–2007), Canadian artist whose work has appeared in role-playing games and video games
- Oshiomogho Atogwe (born 1981), former NFL player, analyst on TSN
- Gwen Aube, poet

== B ==
- Steve Bacic, actor, raised in Windsor
- Ahmad Bateman (born 1961), former professional golfer
- Iain Baxter& (born 1936), OC, Governor General Award-winning visual artist, forerunner of Canadian conceptual art
- Matt Beleskey (born 1988), NHL player
- Michael Dougall Bell (1943–2017), Canada's Ambassador to Jordan (1987–90)
- Brett Bellemore (born 1988), former NHL player
- Dave Beneteau (born 1967), former UFC fighter and wrestler
- Douglas G. Bergeron (born 1960), CEO, investor, philanthropist
- Reno Bertoia (1935–2011), former MLB baseball player
- Alan Bernard (1934–2011), Emmy award winning sound engineer
- Hank Biasatti (1922–1996), former MLB baseball player and National Basketball Association basketball player
- James Bondy (born 1965), entertainer, star of the children's show Ribert and Robert's Wonderworld
- Bob Boughner (born 1971), former NHL player and former head coach of the San Jose Sharks. Also part-owner of Ontario Hockey League's Windsor Spitfires
- Pat Boutette (born 1952), former NHL player
- Bill Brady (born 1932), CM, journalist
- Charles Brooks (1915–1977), auto union leader
- Trish Brown (born 1963), national education advocate, first openly lesbian school board president in the State of Michigan
- Mike Brkovich (born 1958), former NBA player, businessman
- Brian Bulcke (born 1987), former CFL player
- Seth Bullock (1849–1919), merchant and U.S. Marshal famous for tenure in Deadwood, SD
- Ted Bulley (born 1955), former NHL player
- Sean Burke (born 1967), former NHL player
- Jeff Burrows (born 1968), drummer of The Tea Party

== C ==
- Stuart Chatwood (born 1969), bass player of The Tea Party, composer for video game Prince of Persia: The Sands of Time
- Frank Chauvin (1933–2015), former police detective, resigned from Order of Canada over abortion rights
- Kenneth Church (1930–2020), jockey, Windsor / Essex County Sports Hall of Fame inductee
- Stubby Clapp (born 1973), former MLB baseball player, current first base coach for the St. Louis Cardinals
- Peter D. Clark (born 1938), Regional Chair of Ottawa-Carleton (1991-1997)
- Jay Justin "Nig" Clarke (1882–1949), former MLB player and member of the Canadian Baseball Hall of Fame.
- Dorothy Collins (1926–1994), singer, actress, and recording artist
- Arjen Colquhoun (born 1992), CFL player
- Joe Comartin (born 1947), former politician
- Greg Constantine (born 1938), artist
- Dave Cooke (born 1952), politician, former Minister of Education
- Peter Cory (1925–2020), CC, Supreme Court of Canada judge from 1989 to 1999
- Aileen H. Cowan (1926–2024), Canadian painter and sculptor
- Jack Cowin (born 1942), billionaire, founder of Hungry Jack's
- Tyrone Crawford (born 1989), former NFL player
- Sharon Creelman (born 1964), field hockey player
- David Croll (1900–1991), former mayor of Windsor, first Jew appointed to a federal or provincial cabinet in Canada
- Keith Crowder (born 1959), former NHL player
- Emilia Cundari (1930–2005), operatic soprano

== D ==
- George Dadamo (born 1953), former MPP (1990–1995)
- John Damien (1933-1986), racing steward whose wrongful dismissal lawsuit, after being fired in 1975 for being gay, led to the inclusion of sexual orientation in the Ontario Human Rights Code in 1986
- Scott D'Amore (born 1974), professional wrestler, manager and booker
- Ken Daneyko (born 1964), former NHL player
- Jaime D (born 1976), also known as Sirelda, former professional wrestler
- Edward Dawson (1907–1998), Olympic silver medalist in basketball (1936)
- Alexander Deans (born 1997), inventor, artist, and public speaker
- Andy Delmore (born 1976), former NHL player
- Johnny Devine (born 1974), professional wrestler
- Roman De Angelis (born 2001), professional racing driver in the IMSA SportsCar Championship
- Drew Dilkens (born 1972), present mayor of Windsor
- Michael DiPietro (born 1999), NHL player
- Jesse Divnich, industry personality and analyst, video games (from LaSalle)
- Roxi DLite (born 1983), burlesque performer
- Tie Domi (born 1969), former NHL player (from Belle River)
- Charles Drake (1920–1998), CC, Canadian neurosurgeon known for his work on treating aneurysms
- Dwight Duncan (born 1959), former Finance Minister of Ontario

== E ==
- Murray Eaves (born 1960), former NHL player
- Aaron Ekblad (born 1996), NHL player
- Hoda ElMaraghy (born 1945), CM, first woman to serve as dean of engineering at a Canadian university
- Ernie Eves (born 1946), premier of Ontario from 2002-2003

== F ==
- Christine Fellows (born 1968), musician
- Ron Fellows (born 1959), former NASCAR driver
- Colm Feore (born 1958), OC, actor
- Bob Ferguson (1931–2014), sports journalist and writer
- John Ferguson, Sr. (1938–2007), former NHL player and executive
- Katie Findlay (born 1990), actress
- Cam Fowler (born 1991), NHL player
- Gino Fracas (1930–2009), CFL player and long-time coach of Windsor Lancers football
- Eddie Francis (born 1974), former mayor of Windsor
- Ron Friest (born 1958), former NHL player

== G ==
- Frances M. Gage (1924–2013), sculptor
- Marty Gervais (born 1946), poet and publisher
- Barbara Gowdy (born 1950), CM, novelist
- Mary Henrietta Graham (1857 or 1858–1890), first black woman to be admitted to, as well as to graduate from, the University of Michigan
- Tommy Grant (1935–2011), CFL player and member of the Canadian Football Hall of Fame
- Herb Gray (1931–2014), CC, former Liberal Member of Parliament and former Deputy Prime Minister of Canada
- Tony Gray, comic book illustrator

== H ==
- Mary Jo Haddad (born 1957), CM, former president and CEO of The Hospital for Sick Children, first female Chancellor at the University of Windsor
- Richie Hawtin (born 1970), techno musician
- Frank Hayden, OC, professor and pioneer of the Special Olympics
- George Hester (1902–1951), Olympic athlete
- Ken Hodge Jr. (born 1966), former NHL player
- David H. Hubel (1926–2013), research scientist and Nobel Prize winner
- Garth Hudson (1937–2025), CM, organist and keyboardist for Canadian rock group The Band
- Michael D. Hurst (born 1950), former mayor of Windsor, Justice of the Peace

== J ==
- Dan Jancevski (born 1981), former NHL player
- Alaric Jackson (born 1998), current NFL player
- Gordie Johnson (born 1964), guitarist and vocalist of Big Sugar
- Jennifer E. Jones was the first women to lead Rotary International in 2022.
- Spider Jones (born 1946), former boxer
- Ed Jovanovski (born 1976), former NHL player
- Jeon So-mi (birthname Ennik Somi Douma) (born 2001), South Korean singer

== K ==
- Zack Kassian (born 1991), former NHL player
- Jerry Kauric (born 1963), former NFL and CFL player
- Rick Kehoe (born 1951), former NHL player and coach
- Ruth Kerr (1916–1974), athlete, 1932 Summer Olympics, at age 16; first Windsor-born person to represent Canada in Olympics
- Tim Kerr (born 1960), former NHL player
- Malcolm Knight, Vice Chairman of Deutsche Bank and former General Manager of Bank for International Settlements
- Robert Knuckle (born 1935), historian, bestselling author, actor and playwright
- Killer Kowalski (1926–2008), WWE Hall of Famer, professional wrestler and trainer
- Tomasz Kucharzewski (1968–2008), martial artist

== L ==
- Mathew Charles Lamb (1948–1976), spree killer acquitted on grounds of insanity, later killed in action while fighting for the Rhodesian Security Forces
- Thomas W. LaSorda (born 1954), former CEO of Chrysler Canada Group
- Karen Lawrence (born 1951), writer
- Mike Lazaridis (born 1961), OC, CEO of Research in Motion, inventor of the BlackBerry
- Lou Lefaive (1928–2002), Canadian sports administrator and civil servant
- Ken Lewenza, Sr. (born 1954), former head of the Canadian Auto Workers
- Marion Lewis (1925–2025), OC, Canadian medical researcher known for her work on the Rh factor
- Aaron Lowe (born 1974), former pairs figure skater with Megan Wing
- Budd Lynch (1917–2012), announcer for the Detroit Red Wings

== M ==
- Sir Archibald Macdonell (1864–1941), decorated Canadian police officer and soldier
- Angus MacInnes (born 1947), actor
- Alistair MacLeod (1936–2014), OC, novelist, short story writer, and academic
- Marco Marsan (born 1957), author
- Jeff Martin (born 1969), guitarist and lead vocalist of The Tea Party
- Matt Martin (born 1989), NHL player for the New York Islanders
- Paul Martin (born 1938), Liberal former Prime Minister of Canada
- Paul Martin Sr. (1903–1992), longtime federal cabinet minister; father of the former PM
- Sheila Martin (born 1943), wife of former Prime Minister Paul Martin
- Medo Martinello (born 1935), former NLA lacrosse player, NLL Quebec Caribous and MILL Detroit Turbos lacrosse coach, IHL and NCAA hockey referee
- Brian Masse (born 1968), politician
- Kylie Masse (born 1996), swimmer, two-time Olympic medalist and World Champion in 100 m backstroke
- Brandon McBride (born 1994), Olympian, 800m runner, Canadian National Record Holder
- Sean McCann (1935–2019), actor
- Howard McCurdy (1932–2018), the New Democratic Party's first African-Canadian Member of Parliament
- Gordon Morton McGregor (1873-1922), a Canadian businessman who founded the Ford Motor Company of Canada in 1904
- Irving "Toots" Meretsky (1912–2006), Olympic silver medalist in basketball (1936)
- Steve Moore (born 1978), former NHL player
- Eugene McNamara (1930–2016), poet, novelist, University of Windsor English Professor Emeritus
- Eddie Mio (born 1954), former NHL player
- Noelle Montcalm (born 1988), Olympic hurdler
- Mychal Mulder (born 1994), NBA player
- Sandy Munro (born 1949), automotive engineer

== N ==
- Stanley Nantais (1913–2004), Olympic silver medalist in basketball (1936)
- Isabelle Nélisse (born 2003), actress
- Sophie Nélisse (born 2000), actress in movies including The Book Thief
- Dan Newman (born 1952), former NHL player

== O ==
- Joseph "Gerry" Ouellette (1934–1975), Olympic gold medalist in Men's shooting

== P ==
- Mark Paré (born 1957), former NHL linesman
- Alton C. Parker (1907–1989), CM, first black Canadian police detective
- Christina Pazsitzky (born 1976), Canadian-American comedian
- Richard Peddie (born 1947), former president and CEO of Maple Leaf Sports and Entertainment
- Ed Philion (born 1970), former NFL and CFL player
- David Phillips (born 1944), climatologist
- Jacqueline Pillon (born 1977), actress
- Casey Plett (born 1987), writer
- Oliver Platt (born 1960), television and film actor
- Lloyd Pollock (1909–1993), president of the Canadian Amateur Hockey Association
- Barry Potomski (1972–2011), former NHL player
- Cathy Priestner (born 1956), speed skater, 1976 Winter Olympics, silver medalist in 500-metre event
- Valerie Pringle (born 1953), CM, journalist & TV Host
- Bob Probert (1965–2010), former NHL player
- Sandra Pupatello (born 1962), politician
- Matt Puempel (born 1993), former NHL player

== Q ==
- Joel Quenneville (born 1958), former NHL player and former NHL head coach of 4 teams. 3x Stanley Cup winner.

== R ==
- Rob Raco (born 1989), actor, musician
- Amanda Reason (born 1993), Olympic swimmer, former world record holder
- J. Paul Reddam (born 1955), academic, businessman, racehorse owner
- Mark Renaud (born 1959), former NHL player
- Brett Romberg (born 1979), former NFL player
- Ernestine Russell (born 1938), first female Olympic gymnast, 1956 Melbourne Summer games
- Warren Rychel (born 1967), former NHL player

== S ==
- Lionel Sanders (born 1988), triathlete
- Cid Samson (born 1943), former MP
- Dave Schreiber (born 1944), NHL play-by-play man
- Erika Schmutz (born 1973), paralympic athlete (wheelchair rugby)
- Jack Scott (1936–2019), rockabilly singer
- Tyler Scott (born 1985), former CFL player
- Kim Shaw (born 1984), actress
- Dakoda Shepley (born 1994), NFL player, minor acting role as Omega Red in Deadpool 2., and stunt and body double in Game Over, Man!
- Larry Shreve (born 1941), National Wrestling Alliance (NWA) professional wrestler known as Abdullah the Butcher (WWE Hall of Famer)
- Joe Siddall (born 1967), former MLB baseball player
- Al Siegel owner of Elmwood Casino and Windsor Raceway
- Bob Simpson (1930–2007), former CFL player
- Thomas Joseph Simpson (1921–2017), one of the 114 Canadians to receive the Distinguished Service Medal for World War II service.
- Jimmy Skinner (1917–2007), former NHL coach and executive
- Art Skov (1928–2009), former NHL referee
- Glen Skov (1931–2013), former NHL player
- Brad Smith (born 1958), former NHL player, nicknamed "Motor City Smitty"
- D. J. Smith (born 1977), former NHL player, current head coach of the Ottawa Senators
- Brad Snyder (born 1976), Olympic athlete 1996, 2000, 2004
- David Sobolov (born 1964), voice actor and director
- Gino Sovran (1924—2016), Canadian professional basketball player
- Skip Spence (1946–1999), composer, multi-instrumentalist, member of Jefferson Airplane, Moby Grape
- William W. Spencer (1921–2007), Emmy award winning cinematographer
- Niki Spiridakos (born 1975), actress
- The Reverend J O L Spracklin (1886–?), Methodist minister who killed an illicit trader in alcohol in 1920, later tried and acquitted
- Dave Steen (born 1959), CM, decathlete, Olympic bronze medal winner
- Marta Stępień (born 1994), Miss Universe Canada 2018
- Alek Stojanov (born 1973), former NHL player
- John Swainson (1925–1994), Governor of Michigan 1961–1963
- Mark Suzor (born 1956), former NHL player

== T ==
- Tamia (born 1975), R&B singer
- Chris Taylor, lawyer, Global President of eOne Music
- Fred Thomas (1923–1981), multi-sport athlete (baseball, basketball, football)
- Shirley Thomson (1930–2010), CC, civil servant
- Ray Timgren (1928–1999), former NHL player
- Daryl Townsend (born 1985), CFL player
- Keegan Connor Tracy (born 1971), actress
- David Tremblay (born 1987), freestyle wrestler, 2012 Olympian
- Tim Trimper (born 1958), former NHL player
- William Troy (1827–1905), abolitionist and preacher
- John Tucker (born 1964), former NHL player
- Shania Twain, OC (born 1965), country singer

== U ==
- John Upham (born 1940), former MLB player

== V ==
- Daniel Victor (born 1979), singer, songwriter, producer of Neverending White Lights
- André Viger (1952–2006), OC, multi-time Paralympic athlete and medalist
- Christian Vincent (born 1980), actor, dancer, choreographer
- Tessa Virtue (born 1989), CM, ice dancer, Olympic gold medallist and World Champion with her partner Scott Moir
- Harold Vokes (1908–1998), malacologist and paleontologist

== W ==
- Danielle Wade (born 1992) Broadway actor
- Hiram Walker (1816–1899), founder of distillery
- Aaron Ward (born 1973), former NHL player, now hockey analyst for TSN
- Felix Watts (1892–1966), inventor
- Kyle Wellwood (born 1983), former NHL player
- Solomon White (1836–1911), lawyer and politician
- Petey Williams (born 1981), professional wrestler
- Robert S. C. Williams, CM, humanitarian
- Tom Williams (born 1951), former NHL player
- Kortney Wilson (born 1979), professional house-flipper and musician
- Luke Willson (born 1990), former NFL player
- Ron Wilson (born 1955), former NHL player and coach
- Ryan Wilson (born 1987), former NHL player
- Megan Wing (born 1975), former pairs figure skater with Aaron Lowe
- Jacqueline MacInnes Wood (born 1987), actress

== Z ==
- Alexander Zonjic (born 1951), jazz musician
