= Boston Bolts =

Boston Bolts may refer to:

- Boston Bolts (USL), a soccer team that currently plays in USL League Two
- Boston Bolts (1988–1990), a defunct soccer team that played in the ASL and APSL
- Boston Bolts (lacrosse), a defunct lacrosse team that played in the National Lacrosse League (1974–75)
