= Toronto Maple Leafs (NLA) =

The Toronto Maple Leafs were a professional box lacrosse team in the National Lacrosse Association. The team is likely named in honour of the team with the same named that played one season in 1931 with the International Lacrosse League at the Mutual Street Arena. The team started out in the senior A league in 1966. In 1968, the professional NLA was launched and the Maple Leafs joined the league, playing their home games at Maple Leaf Gardens. Stafford Smythe and Harold Ballard, part owners of the National Hockey League's Toronto Maple Leafs, were two of the five founding partners of the pro club, but financial difficulties forced Maple Leaf Gardens Ltd. to take over ownership of the club midway through the season. The NLA suspended operations prior to the following season. However, the eastern division of the NLA reconstituted itself as the Eastern Professional Lacrosse Association, in which the Maple Leafs competed in 1969. By 1970 the pro league had disbanded. Toronto would be without pro box lacrosse until the arrival of the Toronto Tomahawks in 1974.
