= Maple Leaf Gardens =

Historic building in Toronto, Ontario, Canada

- The Carlton Street Cashbox; The Church of Hockey; MLG; The Shrine
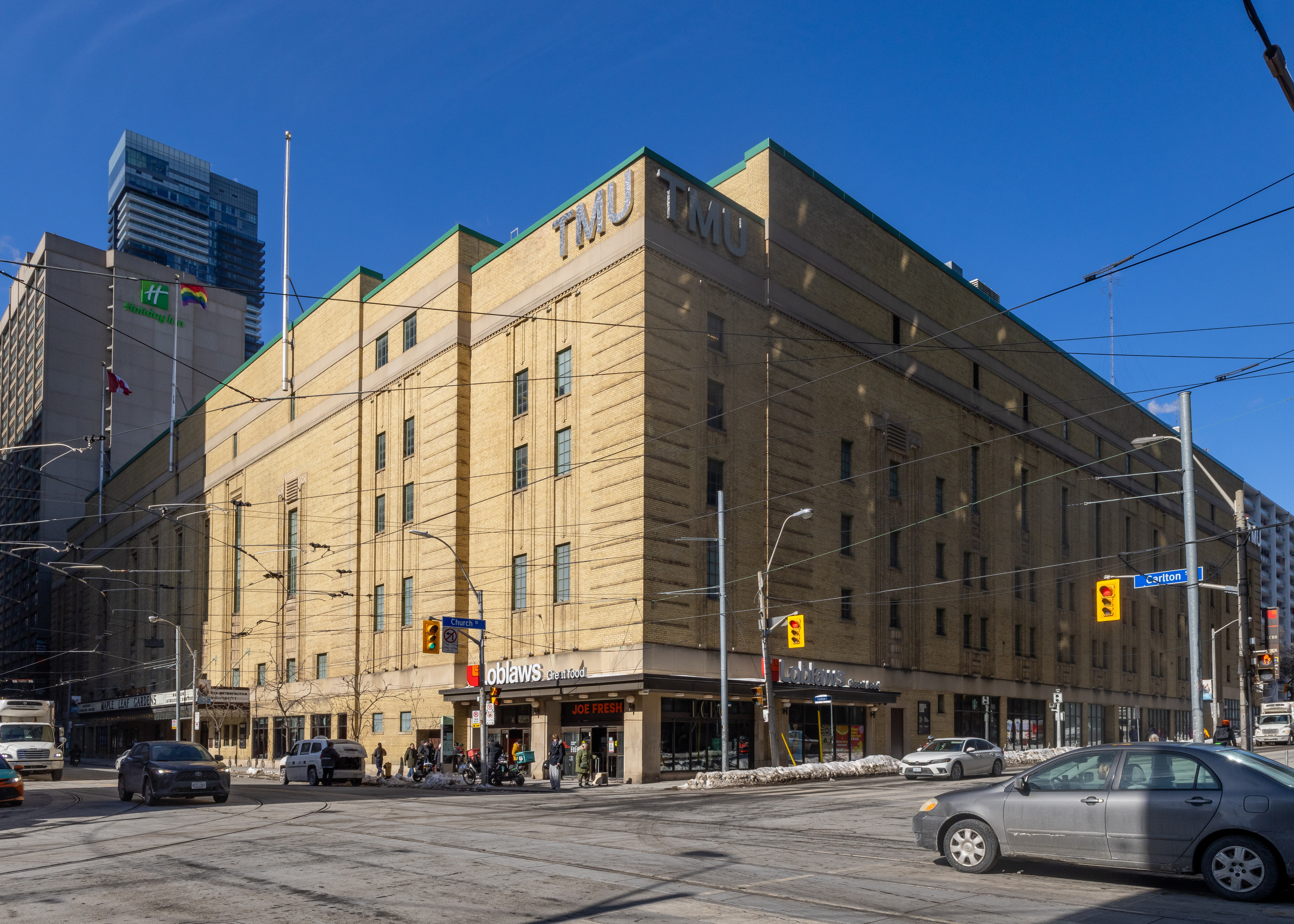
- Maple Leaf Gardens in 2026

- Location in Toronto Location in Ontario Location in Canada
- Address: 60 Carlton Street
- Location: Toronto, Ontario
- Coordinates: 43°39′44″N 79°22′49″W
- Owner: Toronto Metropolitan University; Loblaw Companies Ltd. (2004–present); Former owner Maple Leaf Gardens Ltd. (1931–2004)
- Operator: Toronto Metropolitan University; Loblaw Companies Ltd. (2004–Present); Former Operator; Maple Leaf Gardens Ltd. (1931–2004)
- Capacity: Ice hockey: 12,473 (1931–1940), 12,586 (1940–1960)^{1}, 13,718 (1960–1966)^{2}, 15,461 (1966–1968)^{3}, 16,316 (1968–1981)^{4}, 16,182 (1981–1991)^{5}, 15,642 (1991–1992), 15,720 (1992–1993), 15,728 (1993–1994), 15,646 (1994–1996)^{6}, 15,726 (1996–2012), 2,539 (2012–present)^{7}^{1}14,550 with standing room^{2}14,650 with standing room^{3}16,161 with standing room^{4}16,485 with standing room^{5}16,382 with standing room^{6}15,746 with standing room^{7}2,796 with additional amenities
- Executive suites: 3 suites, 1 alumni lounge (Mattamy Athletic Centre)
- Public transit: College Station; 506 506 Carlton

Construction
- Groundbreaking: May 30, 1931
- Opened: November 12, 1931
- Cost: C$1.5 million ($30 million in 2025 dollars)
- Architect: Ross and Macdonald
- General contractor: Thomson Brothers Construction

Tenants
- Toronto Maple Leafs (NHL) (1931–1999); Toronto Marlboros (OHL) (1931–1989); Toronto Tecumsehs (ILL) (1932); Toronto Maple Leafs (ILL) (1932); Toronto Huskies (BAA) (1946–1947); Toronto Maple Leafs (NLA) (1968); Toronto Toros (WHA) (1974–1976); Toronto Tomahawks (NLL) (1974); Toronto Blizzard (NASL) (1980–1982 indoor); Toronto Shooting Stars (NPSL) (1996–1997); Toronto St. Michael's Majors (OHL) (1997–2000); Toronto Rock (NLL) (1999–2000); Mattamy Athletic Centre; TMU Bold (U Sports) (2012–present); Toronto Shooting Stars (CLax) (2013); Toronto Predators (GMHL) (2013–2017); Toronto Sceptres (PWHL) (2023–2024); Retail; Loblaws (2004–present)

Website
- Mattamy Athletic Centre; Loblaws

National Historic Site of Canada
- Designated: 2007

Ontario Heritage Act
- Designated: 1991

Maple Leaf Gardens is a historic building located at the northwest corner of Carlton Street and Church Street within Toronto, Canada's Garden District. The building was originally constructed in 1931 as an indoor arena to host ice hockey games.

Considered one of the "cathedrals" of hockey, it was home to the Toronto Maple Leafs of the National Hockey League (NHL) from 1931 to 1999. The Leafs won the Stanley Cup 11 times from 1932 to 1967 while playing at the Gardens. The first NHL All-Star Game, albeit an unofficial one, was held at the Gardens in 1934 as a benefit for Leafs forward Ace Bailey, who had suffered a career-ending head injury. The first official annual National Hockey League All-Star Game was also held at Maple Leaf Gardens in 1947.

It was home to the Toronto Huskies (1946–1947) in their single season in the Basketball Association of America (a forerunner of the National Basketball Association), the Toronto Marlboros of the Ontario Hockey League, the Toronto Toros of the World Hockey Association (1974–1976), the Toronto Blizzard of the North American Soccer League (1980–1982 indoor seasons), the Toronto Shooting Stars of the National Professional Soccer League (1996–1997), and the Toronto Rock of the National Lacrosse League (1999–2000). The NBA's Buffalo Braves played a total of 16 regular season games at Maple Leaf Gardens from 1971 to 1975. The NBA's Toronto Raptors played six games at the Gardens from 1997 to 1999, mostly when SkyDome was unavailable.

The arena was also one of the few venues outside the United States where Elvis Presley performed in concert (April 2, 1957). In 1972, Maple Leaf Gardens hosted Game 2 of the famous Summit Series between Team Canada and the USSR—Team Canada won the game 4–1.

After the Leafs and Raptors moved to Air Canada Centre (later renamed to Scotiabank Arena), in 1999, Maple Leaf Gardens sat largely vacant for nearly a decade as the owners refused to sell it, fearing that it would compete with Air Canada Centre. In 2009, it was sold and underwent a major internal reconstruction, turning it into a multi-purpose facility, with a Loblaws supermarket occupying retail space on the lower floors and an arena for Toronto Metropolitan University, known as Mattamy Athletic Centre at the Gardens, occupying the top level.

== History ==
=== Construction ===
The Toronto Maple Leafs had been playing in the Arena Gardens on Mutual Street. It was built in 1912 and held 7,500 spectators for hockey. By 1930, the Leafs managing director Conn Smythe decided the "Arena" was too small, and he wanted to build a new arena, larger and more impressive. After considering various sites, the site at the corner of Carlton and Church was purchased from The T. Eaton Co. Ltd. for $350,000, ($7.01 million in 2025 dollars), a price said to be $150,000 below market value. The new 12,473-seat (14,550 including standing room) arena was designed by the architectural firm of Ross and Macdonald.

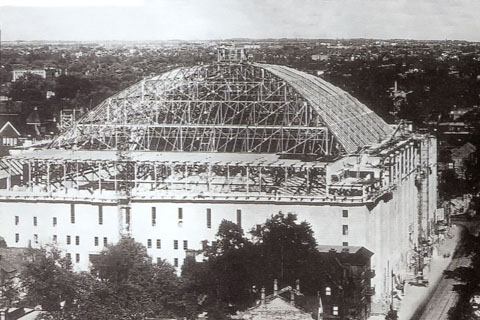
Maple Leaf Gardens roof under construction, pictured in 1931.

To finance the construction, Smythe launched Maple Leaf Gardens Limited (MLGL), a management company that would own the arena and the Maple Leafs. A public offering of shares in MLGL was made at C$10 each ($200.00 in 2025 dollars), with a free common share for each five preferred shares purchased. Ownership of the hockey team was transferred to MLGL in return for shares. Intending right from the start, the Gardens would host other events. W. A. Hewitt, sports editor of the Toronto Star, was hired as general manager of Maple Leaf Gardens to oversee all events other than professional hockey. His son, Foster Hewitt, was hired to run the radio broadcasts and oversaw the construction of the radio broadcast facilities.

The contract to construct the building was awarded to Thomson Brothers Construction of Port Credit in Toronto Township. Thomson Bros bid just under $990,000 for the project, the lowest of ten tenders received, mainly because amongst the Thomson Brothers' various enterprises they had much of the sub-contract work covered (Thomson Lumber, Thomson Bros. Excavation), and others could not compete in this manner. That price did not include steelwork, which was estimated at an additional $100,000. Further savings were made through deals with labour unions in exchange for shares in MLGL. Construction began at midnight on June 1, 1931. In what is to this day considered to be a remarkable accomplishment, the Gardens was constructed in five months and two weeks at a cost of C$1.5 million ($30 million in 2025 dollars).

Team owner Harold Ballard lived in the owner's suite built into the arena's top northeast corner.

=== The Conn Smythe era: 1931–1960 ===
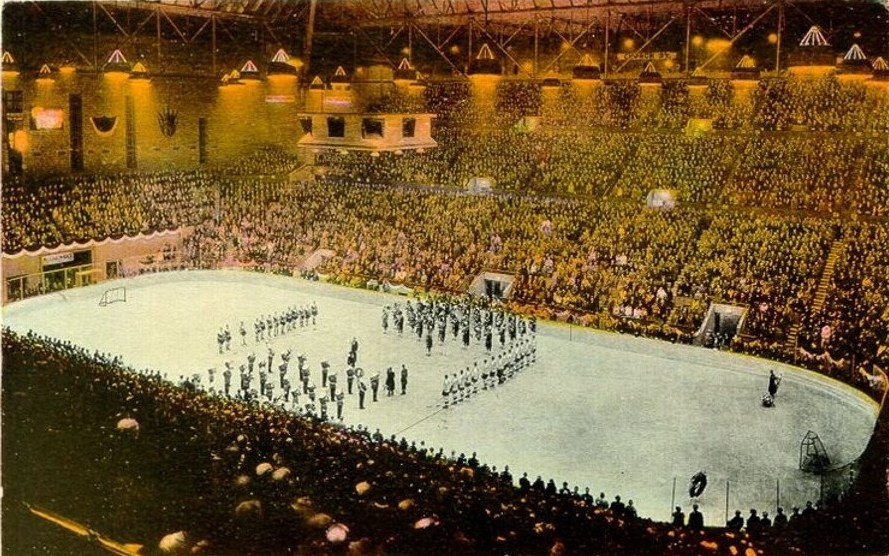
Ceremonies for the opening of Maple Leaf Gardens, prior to a game between the Toronto Maple Leafs and the Chicago Black Hawks.

The Gardens opened on November 12, 1931, with the Maple Leafs losing 2–1 to the Chicago Black Hawks. The reported attendance on opening night was 13,542. The Leafs would go on to win their first Stanley Cup as the Maple Leafs that season (they had already won two previously—one as the Toronto Arenas and one as the Toronto St. Patricks).

The first professional wrestling show at the Gardens was held on November 19, 1931, and attracted 15,800 people to see world champion Jim Londos in the main event. The show was promoted by Jack Corcoran, who passed the reins to Frank Tunney and his Maple Leaf Wrestling promotion in 1939. Under Tunney, Toronto and the Gardens was a thriving centre for professional wrestling for decades. Local hero Whipper Billy Watson became the city's top wrestling attraction in the 1940s and 1950s. The last WWE-promoted event at Maple Leaf Gardens was on September 17, 1995. Boxing was also a regular offering at the Gardens for many years. The first world title fight in the building was on September 19, 1932, with bantamweight champion Panama Al Brown knocking out challenger Émile Pladner in the first round.

Winston Churchill addressed a large audience at the Gardens in March 1932; when the arena's loudspeaker system broke down, he tossed the microphone to one side, declared "Now that we have exhausted the resources of science, we shall fall back upon Mother Nature and do our best," and continued.

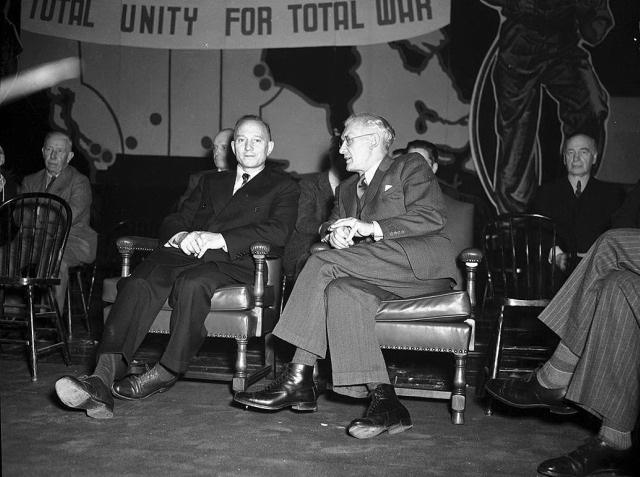
A war bonds rally held at the Gardens during World War II.

Victory Loan rallies were held at the Gardens during World War II.

Ontario Hockey Association (OHA) secretary W. A. Hewitt served as the managing director of Maple Leaf Gardens from 1931 to 1948. When the Gardens opened, it served as the home rink for all Toronto-based teams in the OHA, except for the University of Toronto. The OHA regularly renewed lease agreements to keep the same arrangement.

On November 1, 1946, Maple Leaf Gardens was the site of the first game in the history of the Basketball Association of America (later to become the NBA), with the Toronto Huskies playing the New York Knickerbockers. The Huskies played their last game at the Gardens on March 28, 1947, and the franchise folded shortly after that. In the 1946–47 NHL season, Maple Leaf Gardens was the first arena in the NHL to have Plexiglas inserted in the end zones of the rink.

Smythe became the majority owner of Maple Leaf Gardens Ltd. in 1947, following a power struggle between directors who supported him as president and those who wanted him replaced with Frank J. Selke. Toronto stock broker Percy Gardiner lent Smythe the money he needed to take control of the corporation. The loan was paid off in 1960.

Beginning with the Canadian Grand Opera's production of Faust in 1936, the Gardens became home to more highbrow forms of entertainment. The Metropolitan Opera staged several of its visiting productions there between 1952 and 1960. The first rock and roll concert at the Gardens was held in 1956, featuring Bill Haley & His Comets. Elvis Presley's shows at the Gardens on April 2, 1957, were his first-ever concerts outside the United States. The Gardens also hosted evangelist Billy Graham during his "Canadian Crusade" in 1955.

=== Smythe-Ballard-Bassett in partnership: 1961–1971 ===
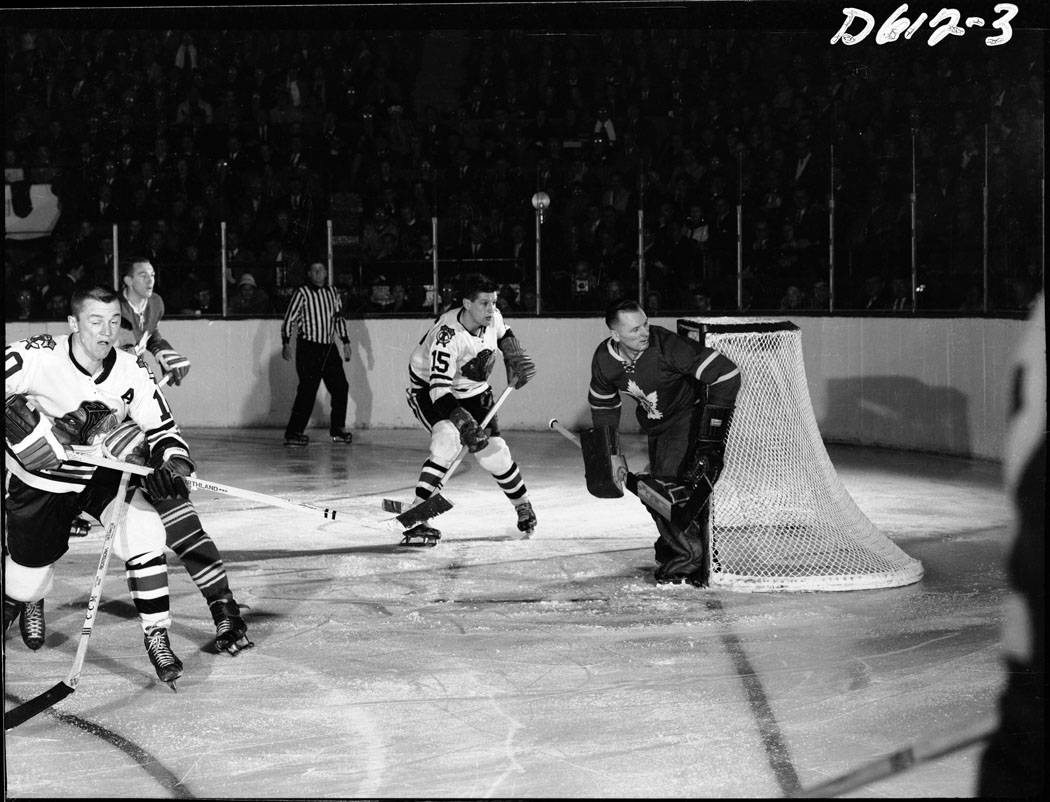
A hockey game between the Maple Leafs and the Black Hawks, c. 1960.

In 1961, Smythe sold most of his shares to a three-person partnership formed by his son, Stafford Smythe, with Harold Ballard and John W. H. Bassett. The new ownership added 962 new seats to the Gardens in 1962 and added a private club, The Hot Stove Club, the following year. Even more seats were added in 1965, and new mezzanine galleries were constructed in 1966 and 1967. By 1968, seating capacity for hockey had grown to 16,485. This was achieved, in part, by making the seats narrower, so that—in the words of founder Conn Smythe—"only a young man could sit in them and only a fat old rich man could afford them." A large portrait of Queen Elizabeth II was removed to accommodate more seats. When asked why he removed the picture, Ballard replied, "She doesn't pay me; I pay her. Besides, what the hell position can a queen play?"

The Leafs were so popular the team sold out every game from 1946 to 1999. It was often called the "Carlton Street Cashbox" in sports reporting. Advertising was sold and placed throughout the building.

On November 8, 1963, Maple Leaf Gardens would be the first arena in the NHL to have separate penalty boxes. The Beatles made a stop at Maple Leaf Gardens during each of their three North American tours: September 7, 1964, August 17, 1965, and August 17, 1966. It was the only venue to host the group on each tour.

In March 1966, Conn Smythe resigned from the board of directors after a Muhammad Ali boxing match was scheduled for the Gardens. He found Ali's comments about the Vietnam War to be offensive and said that by accepting the fight, Gardens owners had "put cash ahead of class."

The fight had been kicked out of every place in the U.S. because Clay is a draft dodger and a disgrace to his country. The Gardens was founded by men — sportsmen — who fought for their country. It is no place for those who want to evade conscription in their own country. The Gardens was built for many things, but not for picking up things that no one else wants.

— when informing John Bassett that he was resigning

Also in 1966, a new centre-hung scoreboard with a digital clock was installed, replacing the SporTimer, which was an analog clock. One of the designers of the new scoreboard, Paul Morris, was by this time the arena's public address announcer, a job he would hold until the Leafs left the arena.

Ballard and the younger Smythe were accused in 1969 of stealing money from the corporation and avoiding income taxes by having Maple Leaf Gardens Ltd. pay for many of their personal expenses. The controversy created a rift between the two and Bassett, which led to Smythe and Ballard being fired from their management positions in 1969, only to win back control the following year. In September 1971, Bassett sold his shares to Stafford Smythe and Ballard. Just six weeks later, Smythe died. His brother and son tried to keep the shares within the Smythe family, but in February 1972, Ballard purchased all of Smythe's shares, leaving him with majority ownership of the building and the Leafs.

=== Harold Ballard takes control: 1972–1990 ===
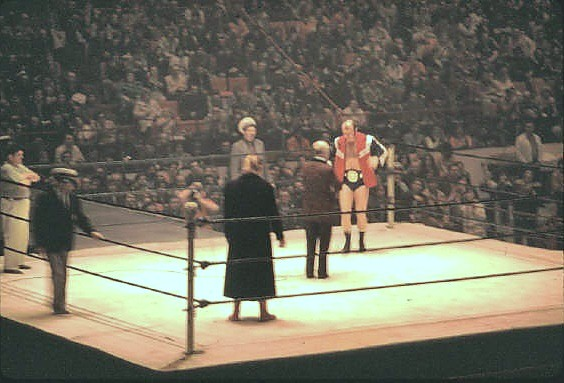
Ring introductions for the NWA World Heavyweight Championship match between champion Dory Funk, Jr. and challenger Johnny Valentine, February 11, 1973.

On July 7, 1974, the arena hosted a Professional wrestling tournament called World Cup Wrestling. Various International stars competed in like Dara Singh, Pat Roach, Danny Lynch, Tiger Jeet Singh, Prince Mann Singh, Randhawa, Than Yen Chang, Majid Ackra, Kashmir Singh, Tony Parisi, Chris Tolos, Golden Boy Apollo, and Terry Yorkston etc. In the main event match, world champion Dara Singh defeated Danny Lynch and retained his title.

Concert Promotions International was founded in 1973 by Bill Ballard with Michael Cohl and David Wolinksy and brought many big-name music acts to the Gardens. The arena played host to The Rolling Thunder Revue Tour, with two consecutive shows, on December 1–2, 1975, headed by Bob Dylan. Bob Marley and The Wailers performed here on June 9, 1978, and November 1, 1979, in support of his Kaya Tour 1978 and Survival Tour 1979, respectively. The Bee Gees performed here on August 31, 1979. ABBA played here on Sunday, October 7, 1979, their last-ever concert appearance in North America. The Who performed at the Gardens on October 21, 1976, marking their final concert with drummer Keith Moon with a paying audience. The Who returned to the venue in December 1982 for the final show of what was originally intended to be their farewell tour. The Jacksons performed here on August 5, 1981, during their Triumph Tour. The video for The Reflex by Duran Duran was shot at Maple Leaf Gardens in March 1984. Toronto rock trio Rush recorded a live video for their Grace Under Pressure Tour at Maple Leaf Gardens. The arena played host to Amnesty International's legendary Human Rights Now! Benefit Concert on September 15, 1988. The show was headlined by Bruce Springsteen & The E Street Band and also featured Sting, Peter Gabriel, Tracy Chapman, Youssou N'Dour and k.d. lang. Pearl Jam performed at the arena on September 21, 1996 (the only Canadian date on the tour). From 1973 until the closing of Maple Leaf Gardens CPI brought the top rock and pop acts to Maple Leaf Gardens.

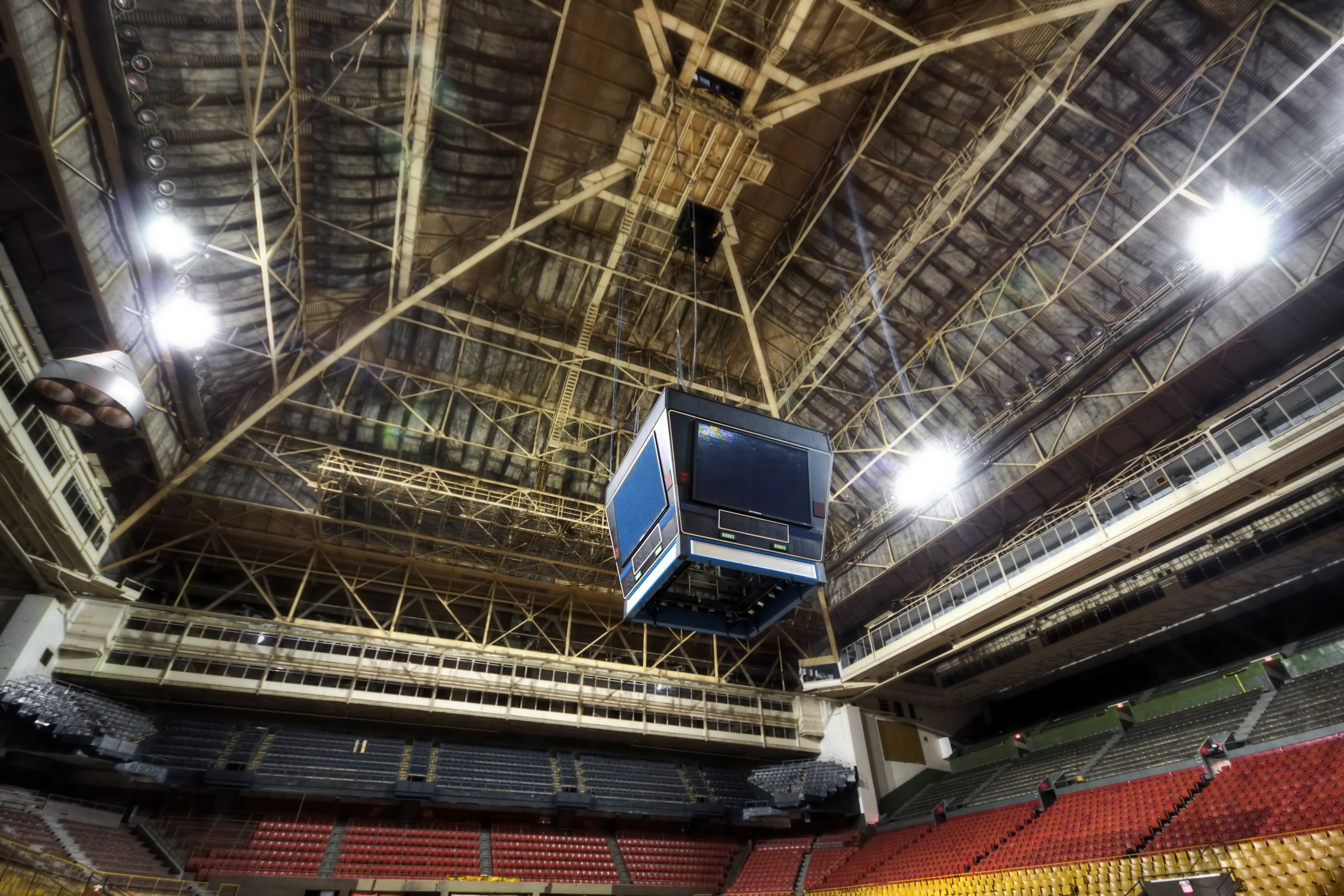
In 1982, the arena replaced its old centre-hung scoreboard with a newer model.

The Leafs continued to sell out every game through the Ballard era, even as the team's performance went into steep decline. It was during this time that disgruntled fans gave the arena its unaffectionate nickname of "The Carlton Street Cash Box." The rink-side red seats were replaced with gold seats in 1974. In August 1979, to make room for private boxes, Ballard had his staff tear down the 48-year-old gondola from which Foster Hewitt regularly broadcast games across Canada and threw it into an incinerator. In an editorial, the Toronto Star called Ballard's actions the "barbaric destruction of one of Canada's great cultural monuments." Then, in 1982, the centre-hung scoreboard that had been in use since 1966 was replaced by a new centre-hung scoreboard with a colour matrix message/animation screen on each side, which remained in use for the rest of the Maple Leafs' stay at the Gardens. Originally an American Sign and Indicator scoreboard, it was upgraded by Daktronics in the 1990s.

Prior to the launch of the Ottawa Nationals of the World Hockey Association (WHA), the team had discussions with Ballard about locating the team in Toronto. Still, the talks did not get very far. The team was a flop at the box office, averaging about 3,000 fans a game, and in March 1973—just before the end of the season—the City of Ottawa demanded payment of $100,000 to guarantee the club dates at the Ottawa Civic Centre. The team decided to leave Ottawa and played their home playoff games at Maple Leaf Gardens, attracting crowds of 5,000 and 4,000 in two games before being eliminated by the New England Whalers. At the end of the season, the team moved to Toronto permanently and was sold to John F. Bassett, son of former Leafs owner John Bassett. They were renamed the Toronto Toros in June 1973. Bassett wanted the team to play at a renovated CNE Coliseum. At the same time Bill Ballard—Harold's son, who was running the Gardens while his father served a prison sentence—wanted the team at the Gardens and opposed the plan to upgrade the Coliseum. The Toros ended up at Varsity Arena for the 1973–74 season. In the following season, the Toros moved to the Gardens after negotiating a lease with Bill. However, by the time the team played their first game at the Gardens, Harold had been released from prison and regained control of the company. Ballard was a virulent opponent of the WHA; he never forgave the upstart league for decimating the Leafs' roster in the early 1970s. He made the Toros' lease terms at the Gardens as onerous as possible. The Toros' lease called for them to pay $15,000 per game. However, much to Bassett's outrage, the arena was dim for their first game. It was then that Ballard demanded $3,500 for the use of the lights. Ballard also denied the Toros access to the Leafs' locker room, forcing them to build their own at a cost of $55,000. He also removed the cushions from the home bench for Toros' games. Following two seasons of declining attendance and onerous lease terms at the Gardens, Bassett moved the club to Birmingham, Alabama and renamed them the Birmingham Bulls for the 1976–77 season.

==== Sexual abuse ====
In 1997, allegations began to emerge that some employees of the Gardens had sexually abused young boys in the 1970s and 1980s. Martin Kruze was the first victim to come forward—contacting the new owners of Maple Leaf Gardens in 1993 and going public in February 1997. His story of abuses beginning in 1975 prompted dozens of other victims to come forward. In October 1997, Gordon Stuckless pleaded guilty to sexually abusing 24 boys dating back to 1969 and was sentenced to a jail term of two years less a day. Three days later, Kruze committed suicide. An appeals court later increased Stuckless' sentence to five years. He was paroled in 2001. In 1999, former usher John Paul Roby was convicted of sexually molesting 26 boys and one girl. He was subsequently declared a dangerous offender and could have been kept in prison for the rest of his life. Roby died in Kingston Penitentiary from an apparent heart attack in 2001. In 2002, former Gardens security guard Dennis Morin was found guilty of sexual assault, indecent assault and gross indecency for incidents involving teenage boys. Allegations—unproven in court—were also made against other Gardens employees, including Ballard. Several civil suits were settled out of court for undisclosed amounts. In January 2006, the Ontario government filed a $1.5 million lawsuit against Maple Leaf Sports & Entertainment Ltd., seeking repayment of the medical costs to the province of treating the sex abuse victims. Stuckless later died on April 9, 2020, after suffering a brain hemorrhage a few nights before.

=== The final years and move to Bay Street: 1991–2003 ===
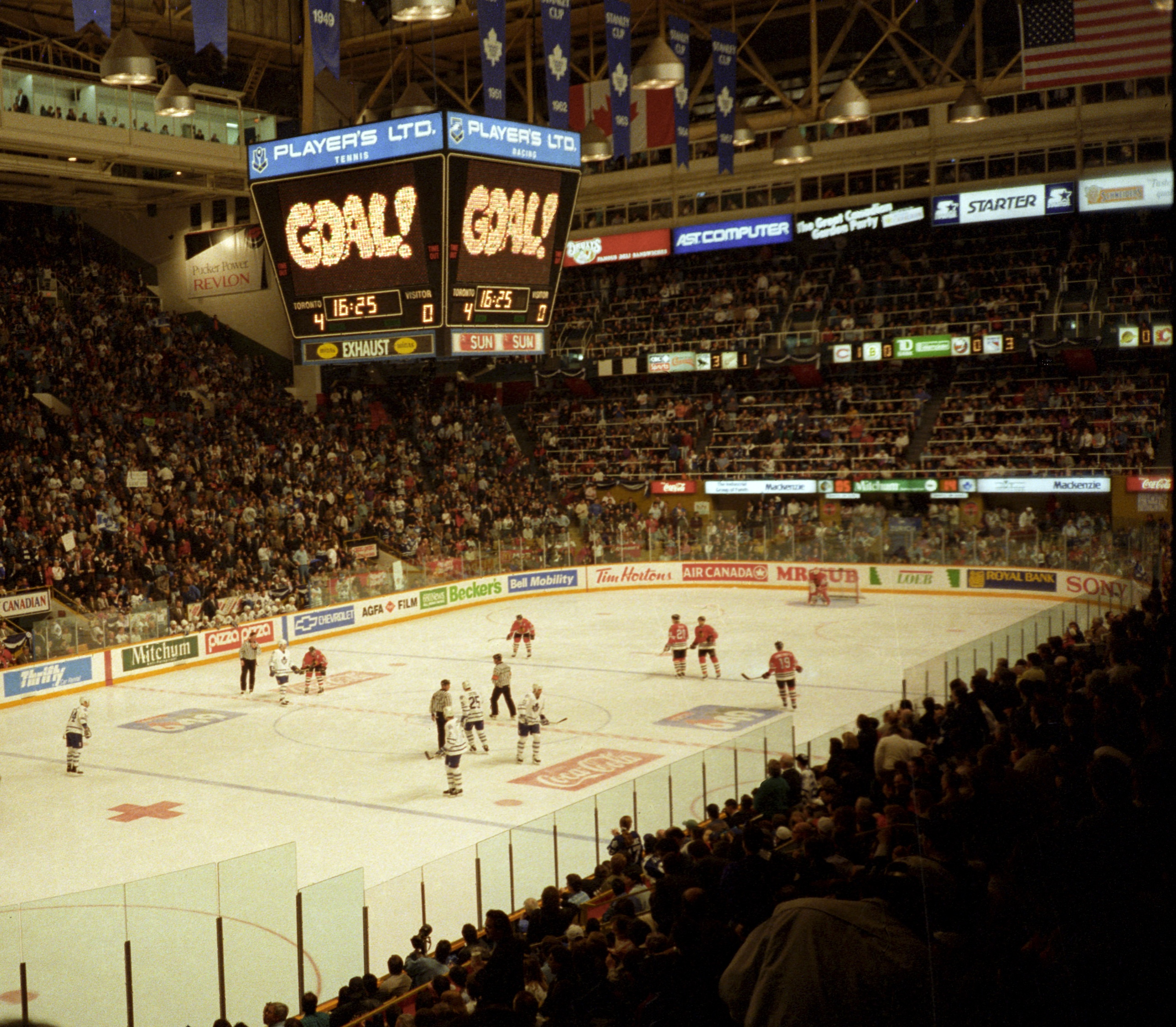
Game 1 of the 1994 Western Conference quarterfinals between the Maple Leafs and the Chicago Blackhawks at the Gardens after the Leafs scored a goal.

Ballard died in April 1990. The executors of his will were Steve Stavro, Donald Crump and Don Giffin. In 1991, Stavro paid off a $20 million loan that had been made to Ballard in 1980 by Molson. In return, he was given an option to buy Gardens shares from Ballard's estate. Molson also agreed to sell its stake in Maple Leaf Gardens Ltd. to Stavro. That deal closed in 1994, and shortly after, Stavro bought Ballard's shares from the estate for $34 a share or $75 million. The purchase was the subject of a securities commission review and a lawsuit from Ballard's son Bill Ballard. However, the deal stood, and Stavro and his partners in MLG Ventures became the new owner of the Maple Leafs and Maple Leaf Gardens.

MLG Ventures took Maple Leaf Gardens Ltd. private, and the two corporations amalgamated. becoming Maple Leaf Sports & Entertainment Ltd. after its acquisition of the Toronto Raptors in 1998. Initially, the majority owner of MLSE, holding 51% of the company, was MLG Holdings, a corporation controlled by Stavro, with minority shareholders Larry Tannenbaum (25%) and Toronto-Dominion Bank (20%). The other 49% of MLSE was owned by Ontario Teachers' Pension Plan. In 2003, Stavro sold his shares and MLG Holdings was dissolved, leaving Teachers' as majority owners of MLSE.

During the 1990s, MLSE considered a number of sites for a new, modern arena to replace Maple Leaf Gardens, including the southeast corner of Bay and Dundas Streets near the Toronto Eaton Centre (the current site of the Toronto Metropolitan University School of Business). By this time, Maple Leaf Gardens was considered too small and lacking in revenue-generating luxury boxes.

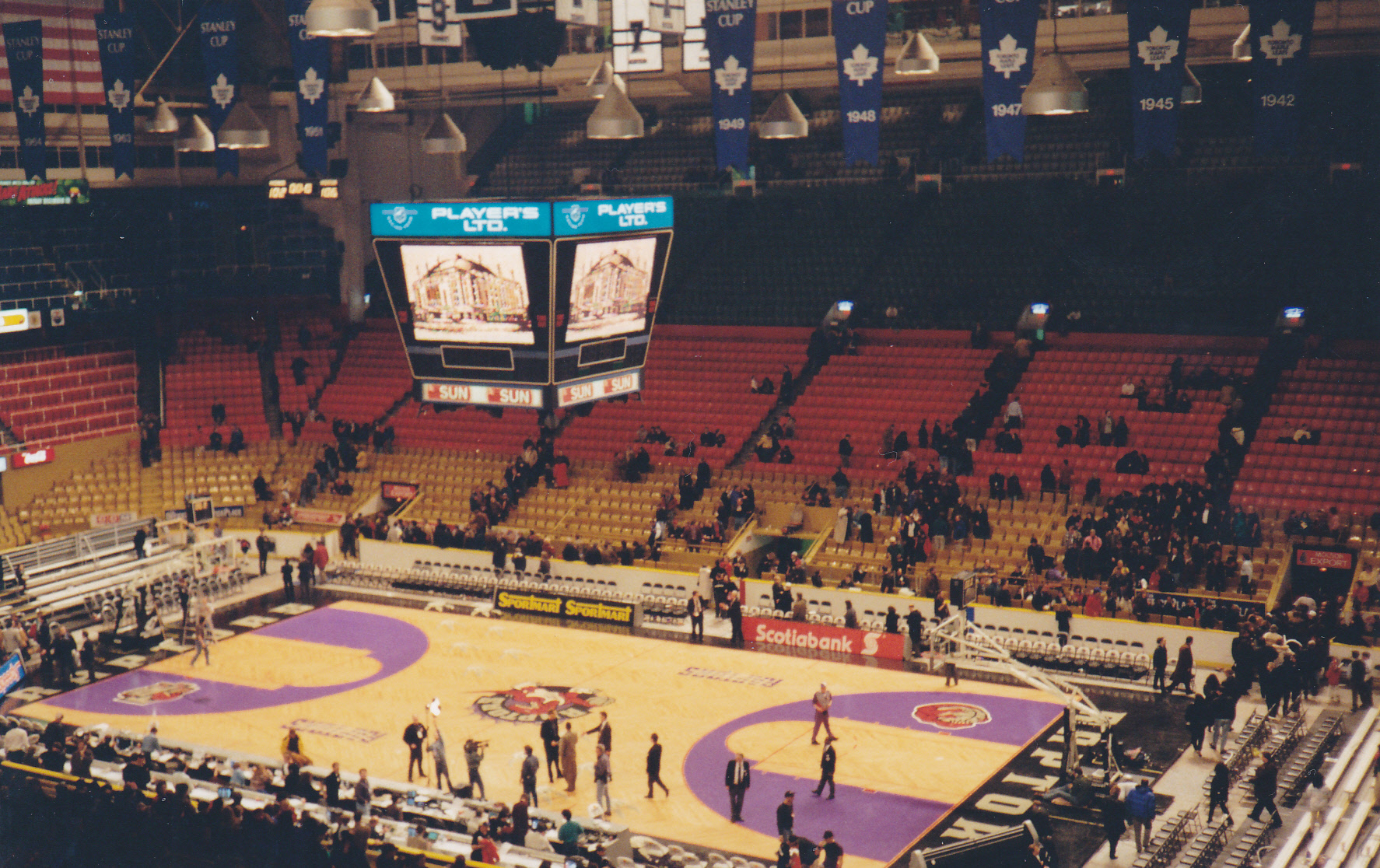
The Raptors at the Gardens in February 1997

The Leafs had no plans to occupy the Air Canada Centre, then under construction by the owners of the Toronto Raptors, and it appeared for a time as though the stalemate between the two sports franchises would result in two new arenas being constructed in Toronto – one for hockey, one for basketball. When MLSE acquired the Toronto Raptors, however, the Air Canada Centre, which was still under construction, was retrofitted to accommodate both hockey and basketball.

The Raptors played their final game at the Gardens on February 9, 1999. A few days later, on February 13, 1999, the Toronto Maple Leafs ended a 67-year tradition when they played their last game at Maple Leaf Gardens, suffering a 6–2 loss to the Chicago Blackhawks. Former Leaf Doug Gilmour scored a fluke goal in that game, and the notorious tough guy Bob Probert scored the final NHL goal in MLG history during the third period. During the emotional post-game ceremony, legendary Canadian singer Anne Murray performed The Maple Leaf Forever, clad in a Leafs jersey along with numerous former Maple Leaf Players dating back to 1931 when the arena opened up, a banner was brought into the ice commemorating the 13 Stanley Cups the Maple Leafs won since the arena did not have championship banners hanging at the time.

Nirvana played a show on their In Utero Tour on November 4, 1993. Oasis was the final musical artist to play at the venue on April 29, 2000. This Oasis show was broadcast live on the internet via Oasis' official website.

The Gardens was the home arena for the Toronto Rock of the National Lacrosse League for the 1999 and 2000 seasons. The Rock won the Champion's Cup in both seasons, making them the building's last championship team. The 2000 NLL Championship game was ultimately the building's last professional event held at MLG. They had a training camp at the Gardens in 2001 and then moved to the ACC. Maple Leaf Gardens was then mostly dormant for a decade.

=== Loblaws and Ryerson/TMU (2004–present) ===
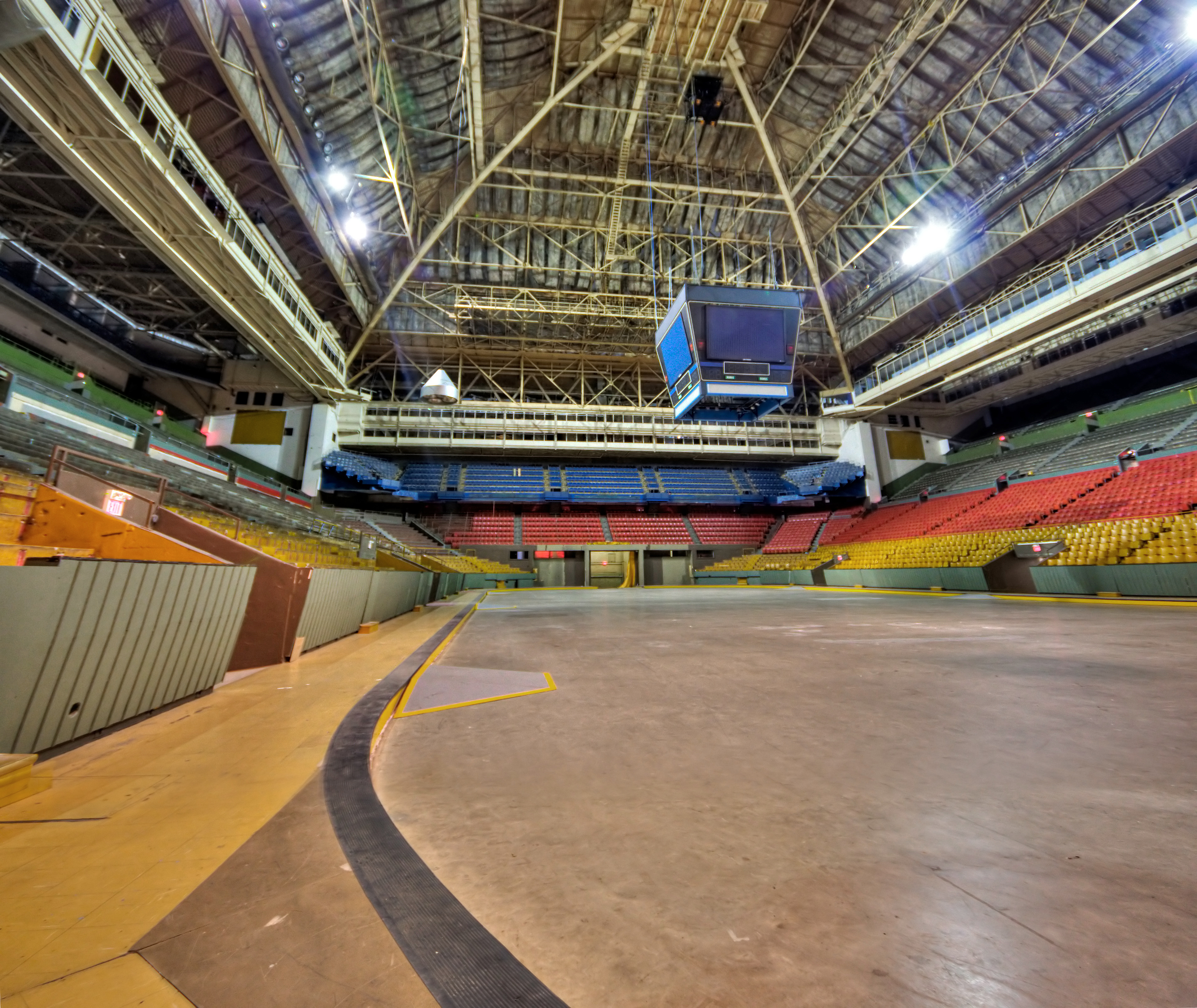
Early plans to redevelop the arena were abandoned when it was discovered the seating was supporting the exterior walls of the building.

MLSE refused to sell Maple Leaf Gardens to anyone who proposed to use it as an arena in competition with the Air Canada Centre. Among these turned down was Eugene Melnyk, owner of the Toronto St. Michael's Majors OHL hockey team and the Maple Leafs' rival team, the Ottawa Senators. Various redevelopment schemes were proposed, most notably an entertainment complex containing retail shops and cinemas (similar to the redevelopment of the Montreal Forum). Still, these plans were abandoned when it was discovered that the tiered arena seating was holding up the exterior walls of the building, acting as a form of interior flying buttress. If the bowl of seating were removed, the exterior walls would lose most of their support.

Loblaw Companies, Canada's largest food retailer, purchased the Gardens in 2004 for $12 million under the condition that it not be used as a sports and entertainment facility. However, MLSE eventually consented to allowing a small arena to be restored in the building. They were planning to convert the interior to accommodate a Real Canadian Superstore (now Loblaws instead of RCSS) and parking. Immediately, there was criticism that the conversion of the building to retail uses diminished its heritage value and that Maple Leaf Gardens should continue to serve as an arena in accordance with its rich history and traditions. Others, however, noted the structure had been deteriorating for several years, and its ongoing use for minor league sports and events would not generate sufficient income to secure the building's preservation and restoration. Furthermore, the active re-use of the building would allow it to remain open to the public for years to come.

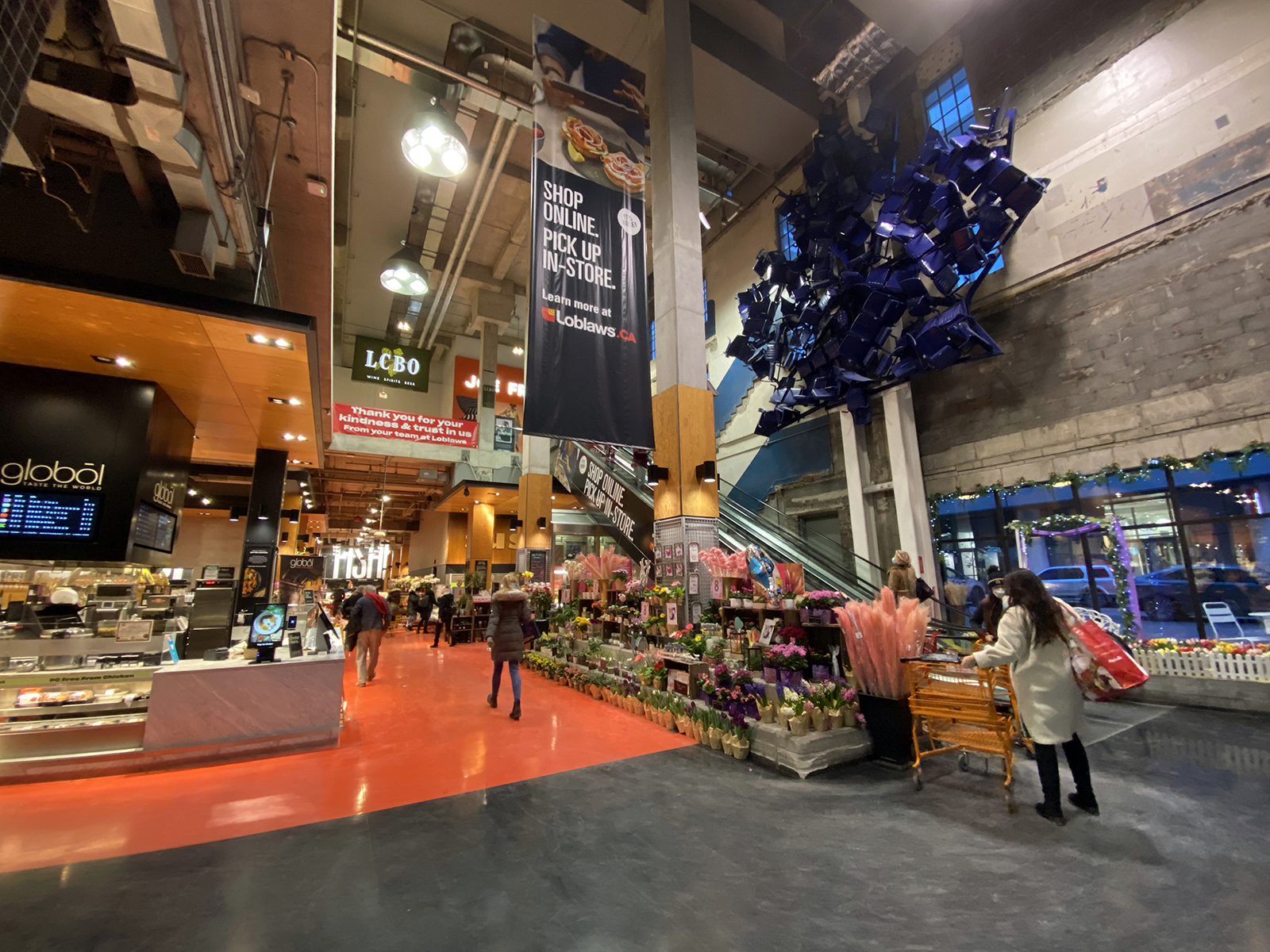
In 2004, the building was acquired by Loblaw Companies, who converted lower levels into a shopping centre.

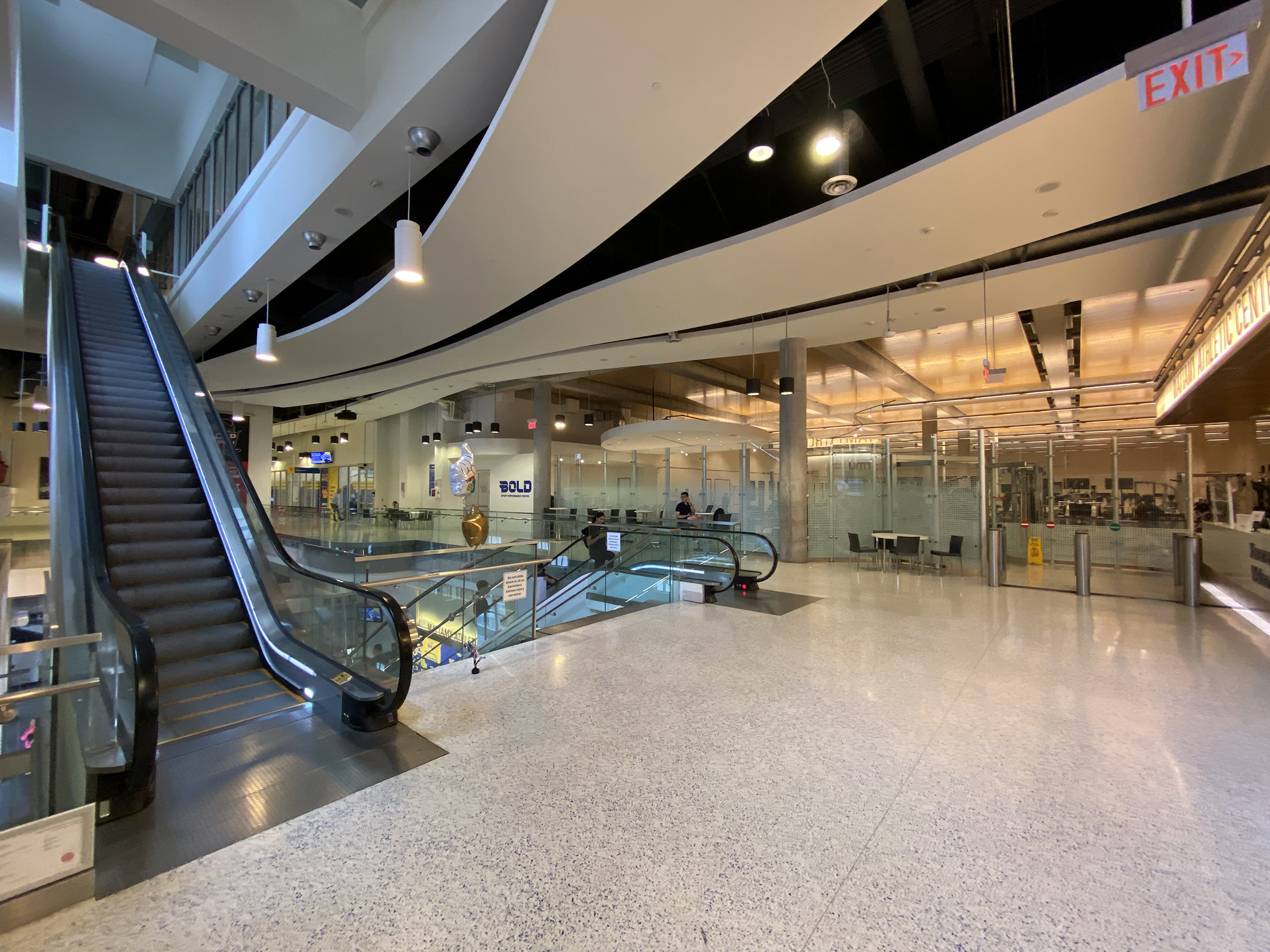
Fitness room in Mattamy Athletic Centre

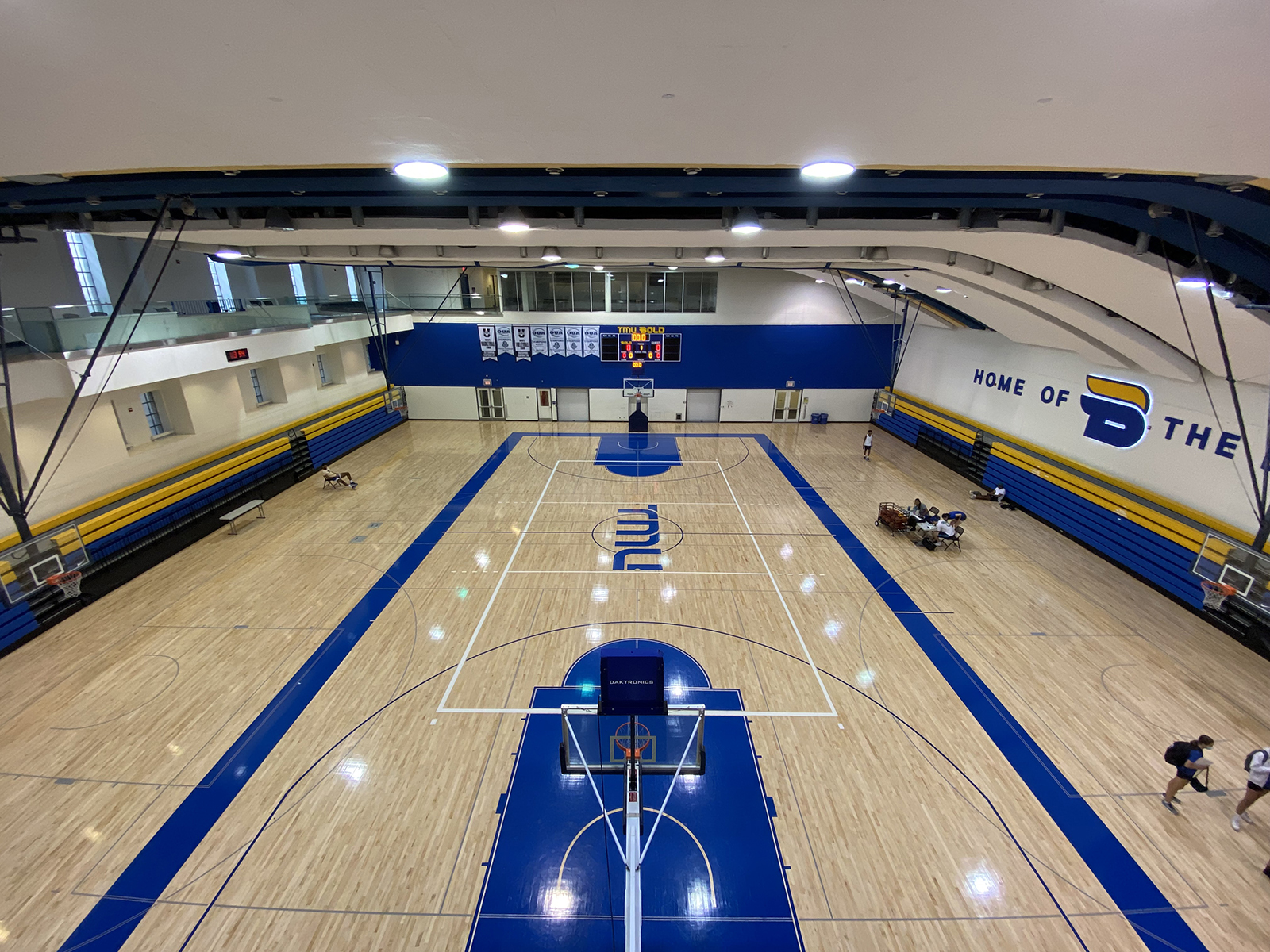
Basketball court at Mattamy Athletic Centre

Needing an authentic stand-in for New York's third Madison Square Garden during the Depression Era, the producers shot the boxing sequences of Cinderella Man (Russell Crowe and Renée Zellweger) at Maple Leaf Gardens in 2004. Maple Leaf Gardens was stripped of some of its outdoor signage for the production of an episode of Canadian-produced Flashpoint. The arena was named "The Godwin Coliseum" in the episode titled "Behind the Blue Line" that originally aired on November 20, 2009.

On September 8, 2009, Matt Damon hosted a concert in support of the charity ONEXONE. It was the first concert at Maple Leaf Gardens in 8 years. The arena was used on May 8, 2009, for the International Gay and Lesbian Travel Association's convention tradeshow. Also in 2009, the arena was used as the venue for the first season of Battle of the Blades, a CBC-produced reality competition pairing former NHL hockey players with professional figure skaters in a pairs figure skating competition.

In 2009, Loblaws announced it had entered into discussions with Toronto Metropolitan University, then known as Ryerson University, regarding the possible future joint use of the arena. On November 30, 2009, the federal government agreed to contribute $20 million as part of a $60 million project to renovate the arena into a Loblaws grocery store and a new athletic facility for TMU, which included a fitness facility, studios, high-performance courts, and an NHL-sized ice hockey rink seating approximately 2,796 guests. The plans involved gutting the existing interior and laying new floors for retail use at ground level, with the athletic centre located above.

In early 2010, Loblaws invited five design agencies to pitch against each other. The brief was simple: “Create the best food store in the world.” Four of the five contenders were North American firms. However, surprisingly, a foreign team ended up scoring the job: Landini Associates, a multidisciplinary retail design and branding consultancy based in Sydney, Australia.

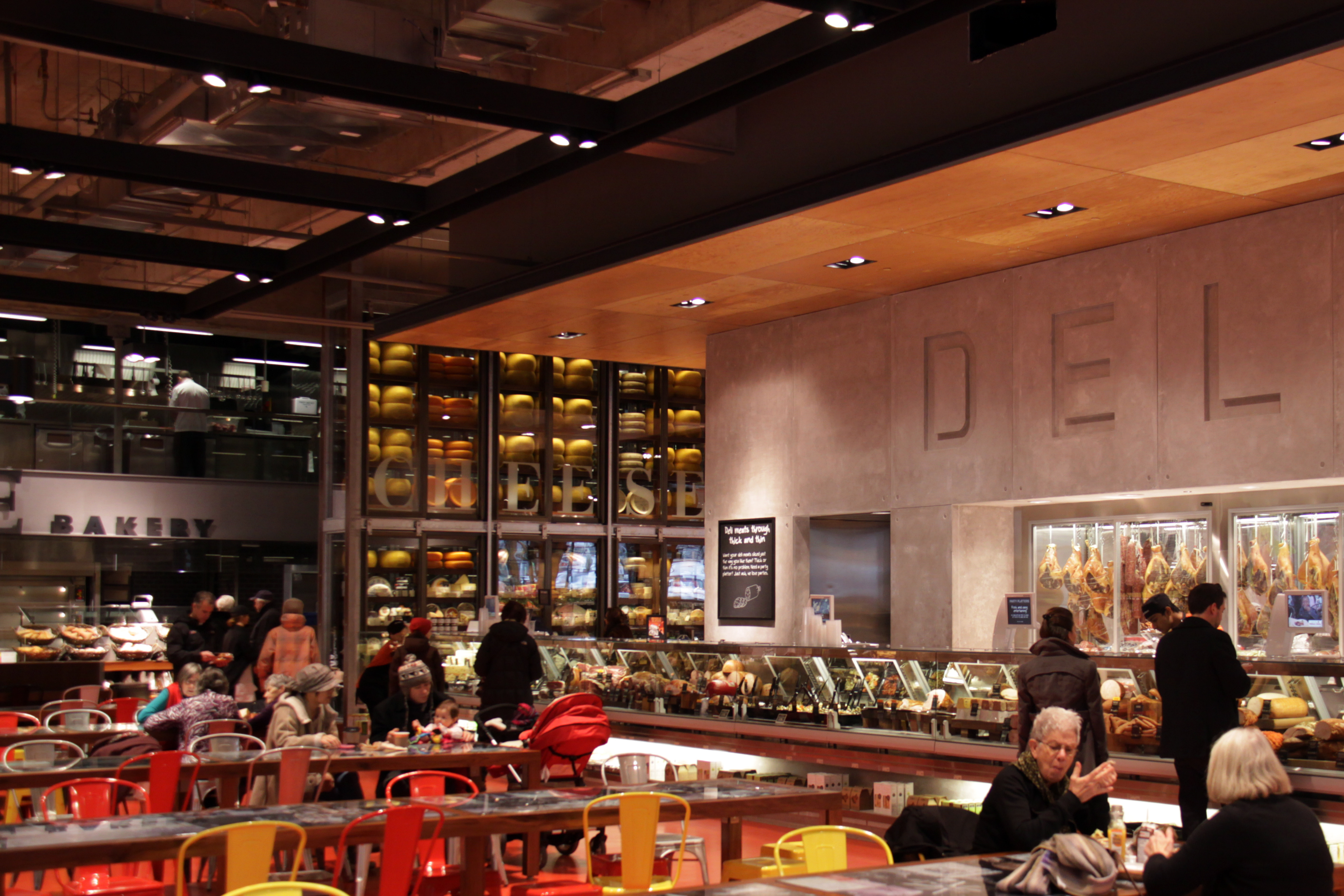
Loblaws Flagship store at Maple Leaf Gardens. Designed by Landini Associates.

Speaking about the project in a 2012 interview with Monocle Magazine, Creative Director Mark Landini said:

“I understood how iconic Maple Leaf Gardens was when I noticed every bar and shop in Toronto had ice hockey on TV. The arena had also hosted the Beatles, Elvis Presley, and the boxer Cassius Clay, later known as Muhammad Ali. So, when the building was shut down, the social context changed. The new store would need to be more than a supermarket. It would have to revitalize this part of the city with a new sense of place. There’s no reason it shouldn’t be part of the community.”

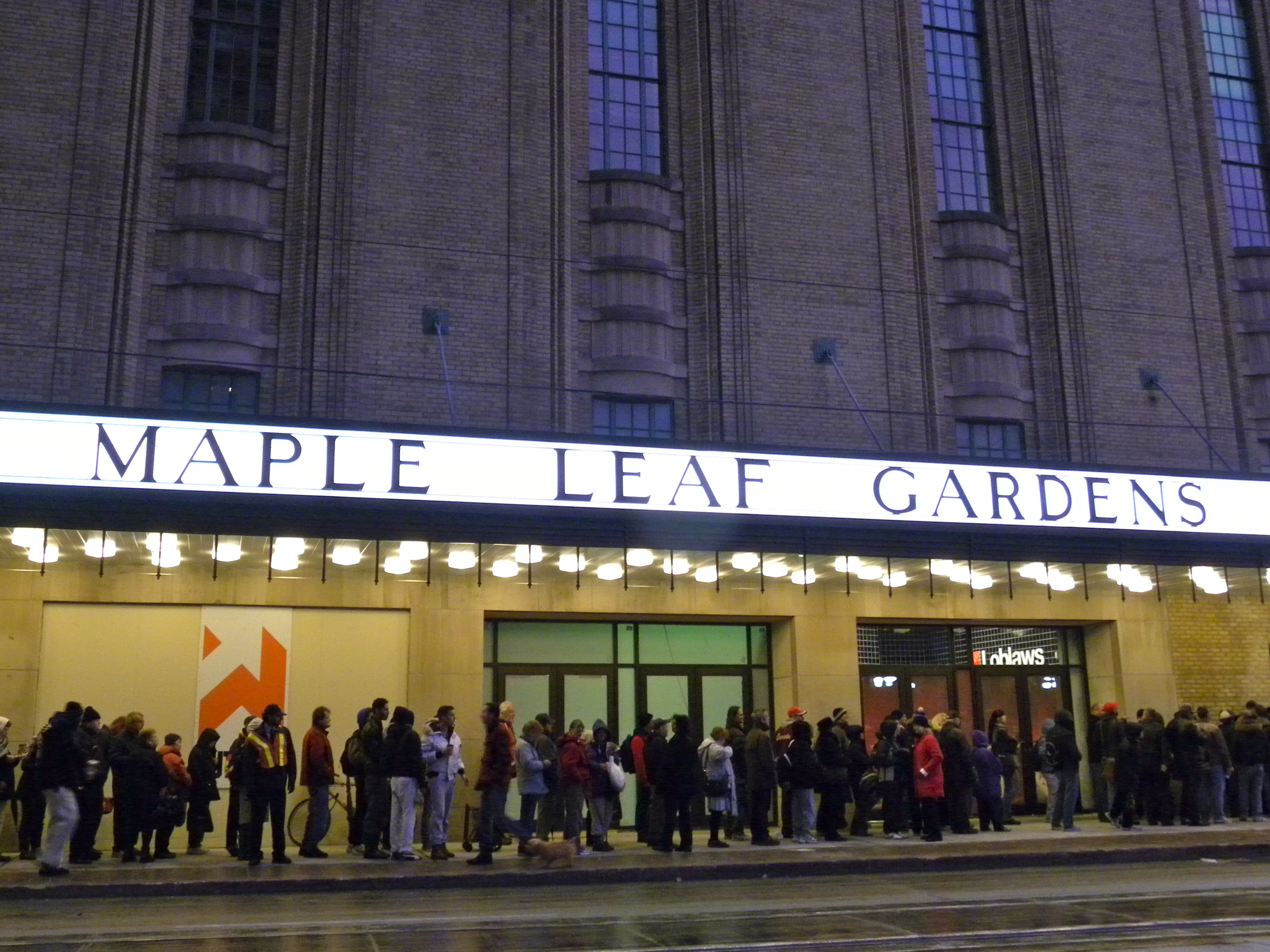
November 30, 2011. Opening queues extended multiple street blocks.

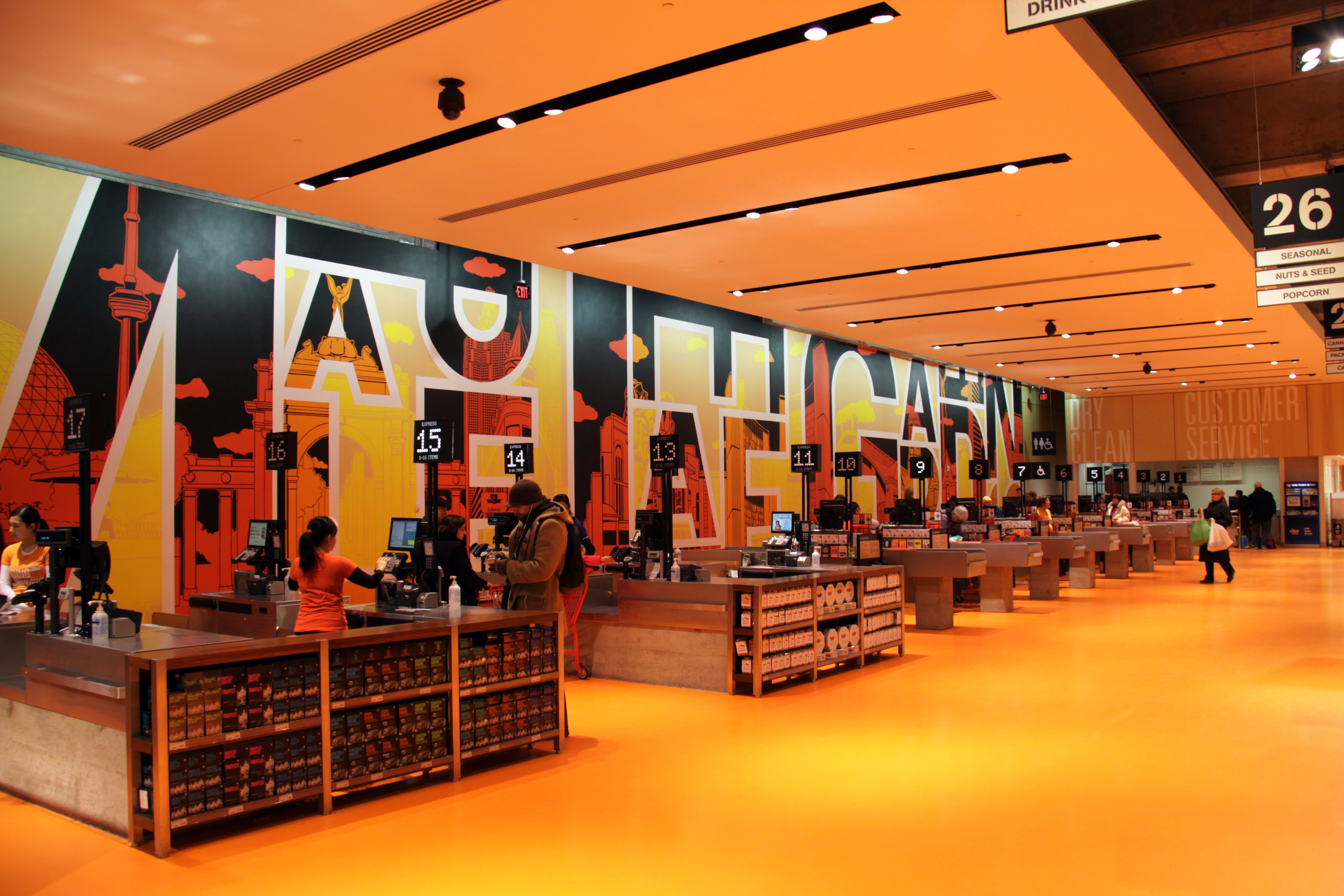
Local mural art decorates the checkouts.

The local firm Turner Fleischer was appointed alongside Landini as building architects. After many delays, including the discovery of a creek running through the basement and a time capsule behind the 1931 cornerstone on Carlton Street, the new store opened on November 30, 2011.

The new design incorporated many elements of Maple Leaf Gardens, including original stadium seats, a red dot on the ground floor marking the original centre ice location, the recreation of an original mural by the checkouts and a 12 x 12-metre maple leaf sculpture made out of old seats from the arena, among numerous other things.

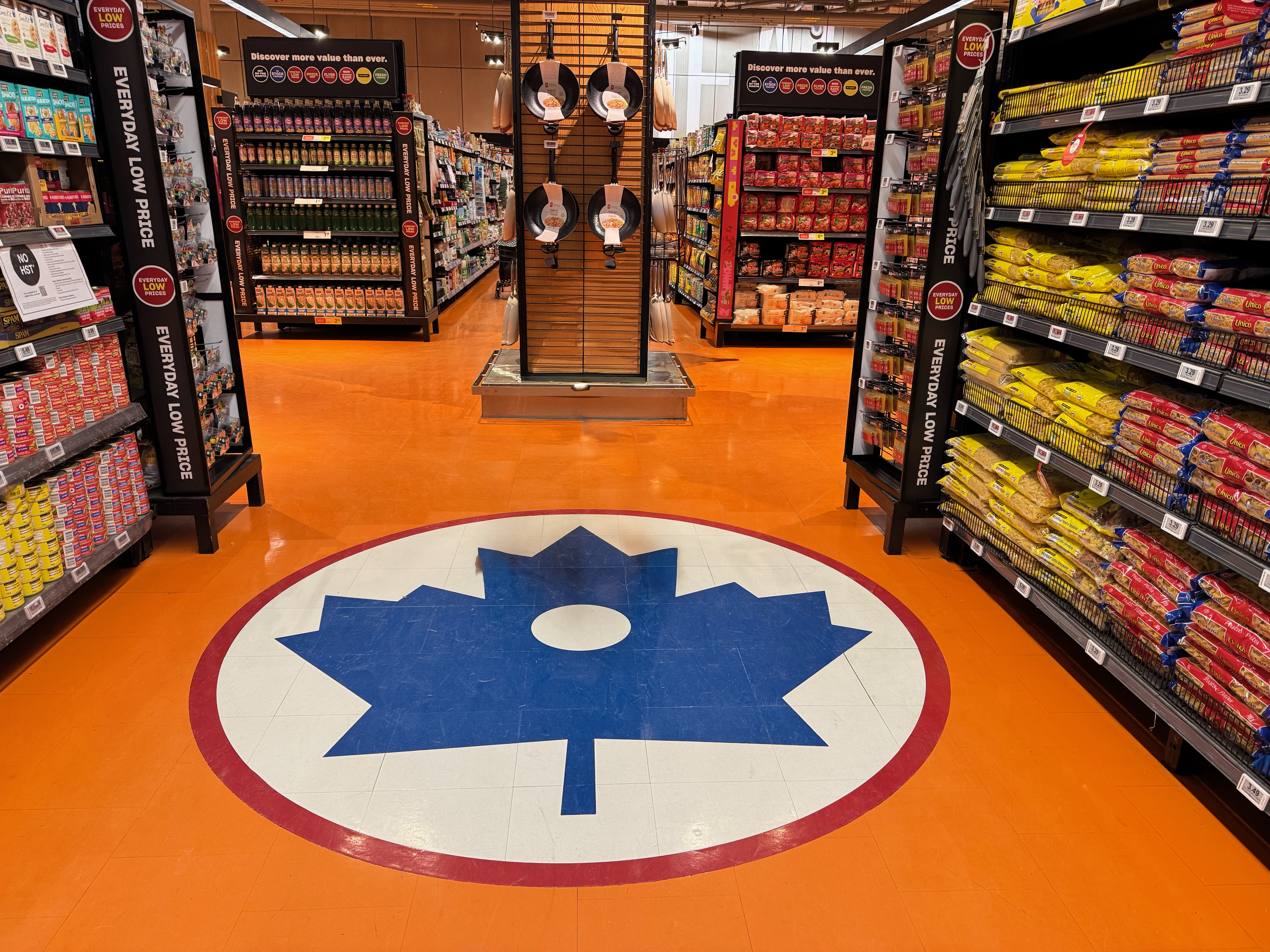
Logo on the floor marks original location of centre ice.

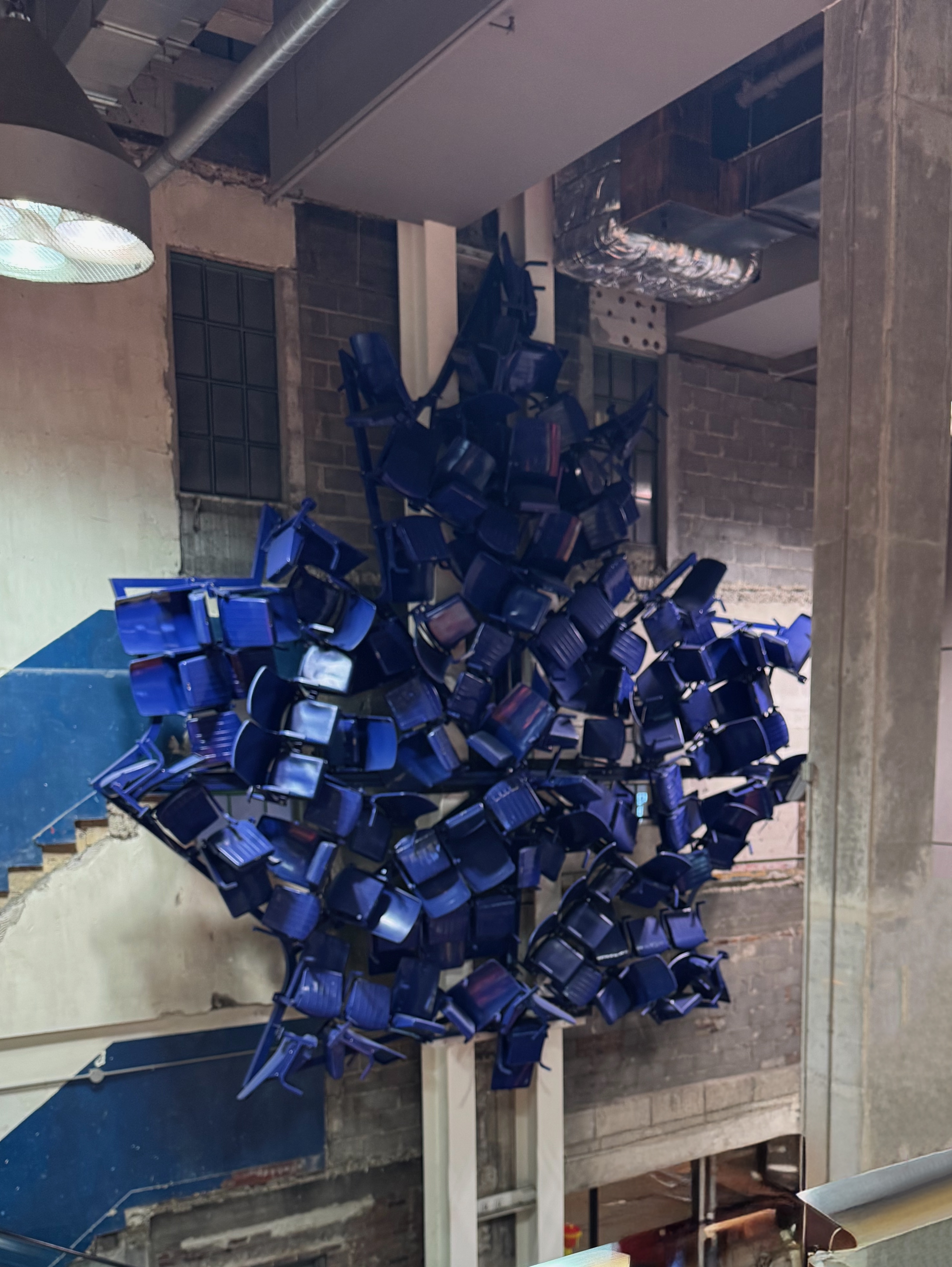
12 x 12 metre maple leaf sculpture made from re-used stadium chairs.

The centre also includes underground parking, a Joe Fresh, an LCBO liquor store and a medical clinic. It is the chain's flagship location.

The transformation went on to win numerous awards, including a World Architecture News Retail and Leisure Interiors Award in the "Retail outlets over 200 square metres (2,200 ft^{2})" category.

== Mattamy Athletic Centre at the Gardens ==
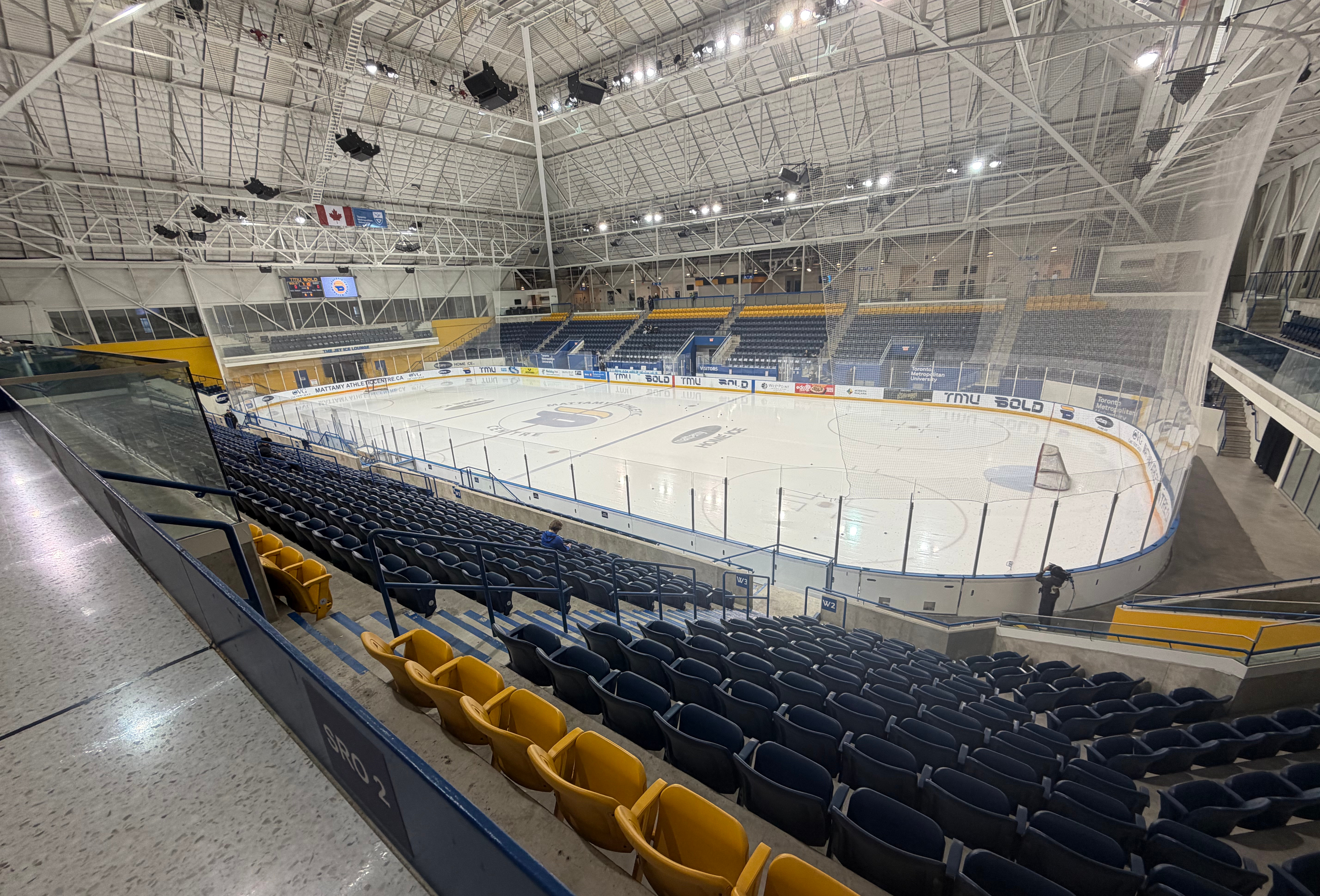
The ice hockey arena for Toronto Metropolitan University is located on the third level of the building.

On November 29, 2011, Ryerson University (now Toronto Metropolitan University) announced that Peter Gilgan, Founder and chief executive officer, Mattamy Homes Ltd., contributed a donation of $15 million to the university. In honour of Gilgan, the new athletic complex was renamed Mattamy Athletic Centre at the Gardens. The ice rink, which is located on the third level, was named Mattamy Home Ice.

The athletic centre construction was completed in the summer of 2012, and the ice rink became the new home for the Ryerson Rams hockey team, now known as the TMU Bold. The first game took place on September 9, 2012, with the Rams taking a 5–4 victory over the University of Ontario Institute of Technology Ridgebacks. The arena is home to the TMU Bold hockey, basketball and volleyball teams.

During the Summer of 2012, the Canadian Lacrosse League announced the relocation of the Oshawa Machine to Toronto as the Toronto Shooting Stars. It was also announced that the team would play out of the Mattamy Athletic Centre, bringing lacrosse back to the Gardens after a 13-year absence. The team held their first game on January 13, 2013. The pre-game honoured former Toronto Rock and Tomahawk players. The team played one season at the arena before folding.

During the 2012–13 NHL lockout the National Hockey League Players' Association (NHLPA) used the arena for a charity game.

From January 25 to 27, 2013, the Ontario Liberals used the Gardens for their leadership convention.

Since 2013, the arena has hosted the Players' Championship, a Grand Slam of Curling event, for all but two years (2014 & 2021).

The facility also hosted the 2014 OUA Figure Skating Championships, won by the Guelph Gryphons.

On December 13–14, 2014, the arena was the host of two exhibition games between the Canada men's national junior ice hockey team and a team University All Stars of combined Ryerson Rams, University of Toronto Varsity Blues and York Lions players in preparation for Canada's participation in the 2015 World Junior Ice Hockey Championships.

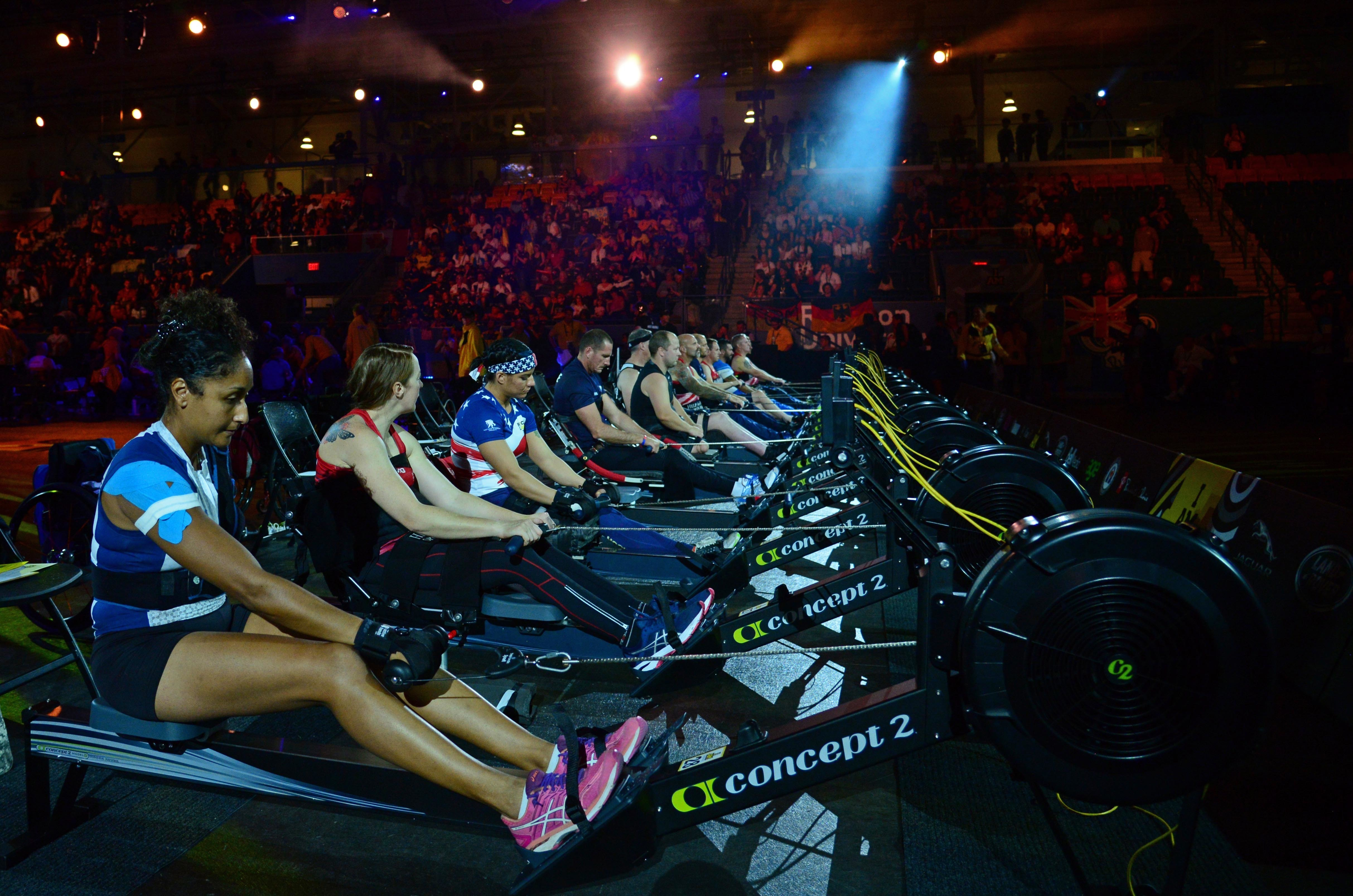
The indoor rowing event held at Mattamy Athletic Centre for the 2017 Invictus Games.

The arena, under the name Ryerson Athletic Centre, was one of the venues for the 2015 Pan American and Parapan American Games, hosting the basketball tournament of the 2015 Pan American Games, wheelchair basketball of the 2015 Parapan American Games and various events (Indoor rowing, powerlifting, sitting volleyball, wheelchair basketball and wheelchair rugby) for the 2017 Invictus Games.

On February 13, 2018, the arena hosted an open practice for the Maple Leafs. This marked the first official Leafs event in the building since the last Leafs game played there in 1999, nineteen years to the day.

Since opening in 2012, Mattamy Athletic Centre has hosted the 2015 CIS Men's Basketball Championship, the 2017 U Sports Women's Volleyball Championship and the 2019 U Sports Women's Basketball Championship.

Mattamy Athletic Centre was chosen for the Overwatch League 2023 Grand Finals, which took place from late September to the start of October 2023.

In November 2023, it was announced that the Mattamy Athletic Centre would become the new home of the then unnamed PWHL Toronto. Toronto hosted the inaugural PWHL game on January 1, 2024, against the PWHL New York, who won the sold-out game by a score of 4–0. Upon the conclusion of the PWHL regular season, the team would later relocate from Mattamy Athletic Centre to the Coca-Cola Coliseum for their playoff games that year and for the following season henceforth as their new primary home venue as the re-branded Toronto Sceptres.

== Recognition ==
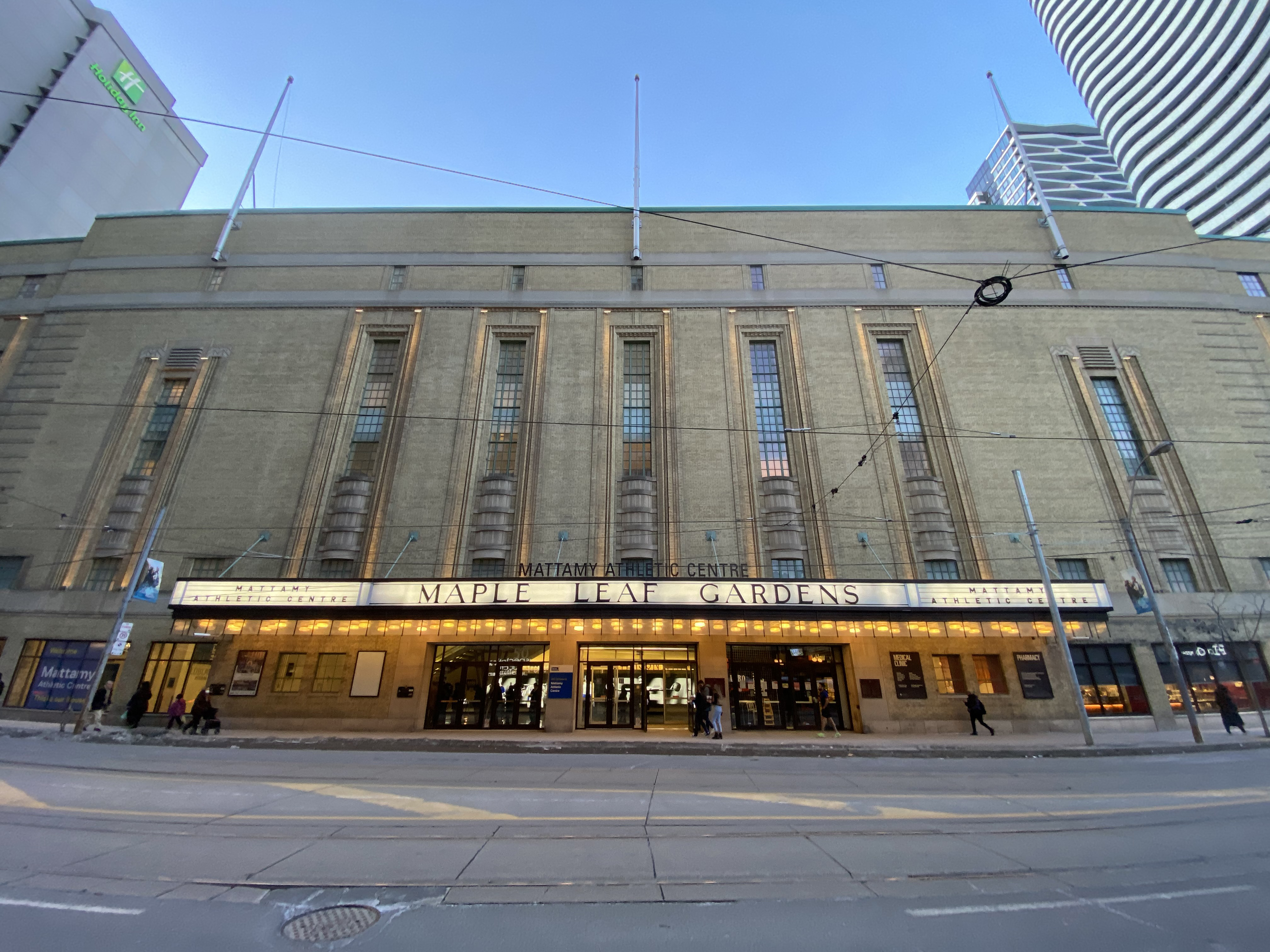
The entrance to Maple Leaf Gardens in 2020.

Maple Leaf Gardens was named a National Historic Site of Canada in 2007 because it was:

one of the most renowned "shrines" in the history of hockey ... the largest arena in the country when it was built, it was one of the country's foremost venues for large-scale sporting events such as boxing matches and track meets, and non-sporting events such as concerts, rallies and political gatherings, religious services and opera ... the Gardens holds a special place in the country's popular culture: here Canadians welcomed a wide range of cultural icons from the Beatles to the Metropolitan Opera, from Tim Buck to Team Canada vs. the Soviets, from Winston Churchill to the Muhammad Ali-George Chuvalo fight.

— Historic Sites and Monuments Board of Canada, Minutes, June 2006.

The arena was also designated under the Ontario Heritage Act by the City of Toronto in 1991.

== Other teams ==
A list of other teams using Maple Leaf Gardens as their home:

- Toronto Lions 1931–1939 Ontario Hockey Association
- Toronto Marlboros 1931–1989 Ontario Hockey Association/Ontario Hockey League
- Toronto Young Rangers 1937–1948 Ontario Hockey Association/Ontario Hockey League
- Toronto Huskies 1946–1947 Basketball Association of America
- New York Rangers 1950 Stanley Cup Finals National Hockey League
- Toronto Knob Hill Farms 1962–1963 Metro Junior A League
- Buffalo Braves 1971–1975 National Basketball Association (16 home games)
- Ottawa Nationals 1972–1973 playoffs World Hockey Association
- Toronto Toros 1974–1976 World Hockey Association
- Toronto Tomahawks 1974 National Lacrosse League
- Toronto Blizzard 1980–1982 North American Soccer League
- Toronto Raptors 1997–1999 National Basketball Association (6 home games)
- Toronto Shooting Stars 1996–1997 National Professional Soccer League
- Toronto St. Michael's Majors 1997–2000 Ontario Hockey League
- Toronto Rock 1999–2000 National Lacrosse League
- Toronto Predators 2013–2017 Greater Metro Junior A Hockey League
- TMU Bold
- Toronto Sceptres 2023–24 Professional Women's Hockey League

== Concerts ==
Queen performed various concerts from A Day at the Races Tour to Hot Space Tour from 1970s to 1980s. The Beatles performed three historic concerts at Maple Leaf Gardens from 1964 to 1966, staying at The Omni King Edward Hotel. Elvis Presley performed two famous shows on April 2, 1957, at 6 PM and 8 PM. Jimi Hendrix played Maple Leaf Gardens on May 3, 1969, despite being arrested for drug possession upon arriving at Pearson Airport.

== See also ==
- Cincinnati Gardens (modelled significantly on Maple Leaf Gardens)
- Coca-Cola Coliseum
- Harringay Arena (modelled significantly on Maple Leaf Gardens)
- List of indoor arenas in Canada
- Talbot Gardens (renovated on a design based on Maple Leaf Gardens during the 1990s)
- Varsity Arena

== Sources ==
- Hunter, Douglas (1997). Champions: The Illustrated History of Hockey's Greatest Dynasties. Chicago, Illinois: Triumph Books. ISBN 1-57243-213-6.
- Obodiac, Stan (1981). Maple Leaf Gardens: Fifty Years Of History. Van Nostrand Reinhold Ltd.
- Smythe, Conn; Young, Scott (1981). Conn Smythe: If you can't beat 'em in the alley. Toronto, Ontario: McClelland and Stewart. ISBN 0-7710-9078-1.
- Smythe, Thomas Stafford; Shea, Kevin (2000). Centre Ice: The Smythe Family, the Gardens, and the Toronto Maple Leafs Hockey Club. Bolton, Ontario, Canada: Fenn Publishing Co. ISBN 1-55168-250-8.

Preceded by Arena Gardens	Home of the Toronto Maple Leafs; 1931–1999	Succeeded by Air Canada Centre
Preceded by SkyDome	Home of the Toronto Raptors; 1997–1999	Succeeded by Copps Coliseum
Preceded by Copps Coliseum	Home of the Toronto Rock; 1999–2000	Succeeded by Air Canada Centre
Preceded by first arena	Home of the Toronto Huskies; 1946–1947	Succeeded by last arena
Preceded by first game Chicago Stadium; Detroit Olympia; Chicago Stadium; Montreal Forum	Host of the NHL All-Star Game; 1947; 1949; 1951; 1962–1964; 1968	Succeeded by Chicago Stadium; Detroit Olympia; Detroit Olympia; Montreal Forum; Montreal Forum
