= Medo Martinello =

Canadian lacrosse player

Miro "Medo" Martinello
Personal information
- Born: December 6, 1935 (age 90) Windsor, Ontario, Canada

Sport
- Position: Forward
- Coached by: Detroit Turbos (MILL); Quebec Caribous (NLL)
- NLA OSALL OSBLL team: Detroit Olympics (NLA); Brampton Ramblers (OSALL); Windsor Warlocks (OSBLL)
- Pro career: 1962–1971

Career highlights
- Presidents Cup: 1970, 1971; Champion's Cup: 1991 (Coach)

Miro "Medo" Martinello (born December 6, 1935) is a Canadian former professional box lacrosse player, coach, and ice hockey referee, born in Windsor, Ontario, Canada of Italian descent. He is a member of the Windsor and Essex County Sports Hall of Fame, Ontario Lacrosse Hall of Fame, and is a recipient of the Canadian Government 125th Anniversary of Confederation Medal "for outstanding Achievements on behalf of Canada".

== Biography ==
Martinello was born in Windsor, Ontario on December 6, 1935.

He played box lacrosse from the age of 12, playing in the Ontario Junior B Lacrosse League with Windsor Joe's Cement in his later teens. He played in the OLA Senior B Lacrosse League in the 1960s and 1970s winning the OLA Sr. B title in 1961 with the Leamington Clippers and later the 1970 and 1971 Canadian National Championship Presidents Cup with the Windsor Clippers and Windsor Warlocks.

In 1962, Medo played for the Brampton Ramblers of the OLA Sr. A League, then the highest level of the sport in the world. In 1968, he had an 8-game stint with the newly formed professional Detroit Olympics of the National Lacrosse Association, again, then the highest level for the sport in its era.

In hockey, Medo played his junior hockey with the Blenheim Blades of the Border Cities Junior B Hockey League before becoming a referee. From 1953 to 1955, Martinello was a minor hockey referee. From 1956 until 1960, he reffed Junior B and C in the Ontario Hockey Association. In the 1960s, Martinello reffed in the elite-amateur OHA Senior A Hockey League and professional International Hockey League. From 1970 until 1989, Medo reffed all levels of Junior hockey, from A down to C, for the OHA. In 1972, Medo became the first Canadian to referee an NCAA Final, the game was between Boston University and University of Denver. Medo often was chosen to ref international games between NCAA and IHL teams and the likes of Russia and Czechoslovakia and also helped to create the 2-referee system in the NCAA in the 1970s, since followed by most major leagues.

As a coach, Martinello led the Windsor Warlocks Jr. C Lacrosse team to OLA and Eastern Canadian titles in 1972 and 1973. He led the 1975 Quebec Caribous of the National Lacrosse League to a professional championship. From 1989 until 1992, Medo coached the Detroit Turbos of the Major Indoor Lacrosse League winning the 1991 league championship.

In 1992, Martinello was honoured by the Canadian Government with the 125th Anniversary of Confederation Medal "for outstanding Achievements on behalf of Canada". On November 13, 2001, Medo was inducted into the Windsor and Essex County Sports Hall of Fame as a Founder. He was inducted into the Ontario Lacrosse Hall of Fame in 2005.

== Player statistics ==
			Regular Season					Playoffs				
Season	League	Team	GP	G	A	P	PIM	GP	G	A	P	PIM
1962	OLA Sr. A	Brampton Ramblers	4	4	0	4	10	DNP				
1963	OLA Int. A	Wallaceburg Red Devils	3	6	1	7	4	DNP				
1964	OLA Sr. B	DNP										
1965	OLA Sr. B	Windsor Clippers	2	4	0	4	4	3	3	1	4	13
1966	OLA Sr. B	Windsor Clippers	17	40	10	50	63	6	12	6	18	30
1967	OLA Sr. B	Windsor Clippers	16	33	9	42	49	5	4	5	9	13
1968	OLA Sr. B	Windsor Clippers	xx	12	4	16	xx	xx	4	0	4	xx
1968	NLL	Detroit Olympics	8	4	4	8	20	DNP				
1969	OLA Sr. B	DNP										
1970	OLA Sr. B	Windsor Clippers	14	21	33	54	59	9	13	13	26	24
1971	OLA Sr. B	Windsor Warlocks	7	6	13	19	24	15	9	20	29	53

== Coaching Record ==
Year	League	Team	Record	Win%	Playoffs
1972	OLA Jr. C	Windsor Warlocks	16-4	.800	OLA & Eastern Canada Champions
1973	OLA Jr. C	Windsor Warlocks	18-2	.900	OLA & Eastern Canada Champions
1974	NLL	Syracuse Stingers	12-27-1	.313	DNQ
1975	NLL	Quebec Caribous	22-24-2	.479	NLL Champions
1989	MILL	Detroit Turbos	6-2	.750	Lost semi-final
1990	MILL	Detroit Turbos	1-7	.125	DNQ
1991	MILL	Detroit Turbos	8-2	.800	MILL Champions
1992	MILL	Detroit Turbos	8-2	.800	Lost division final
