= Talbot Gardens =

Ice hockey arena in Simcoe, Ontario

Coordinates: 42.836891°N 80.308106°W

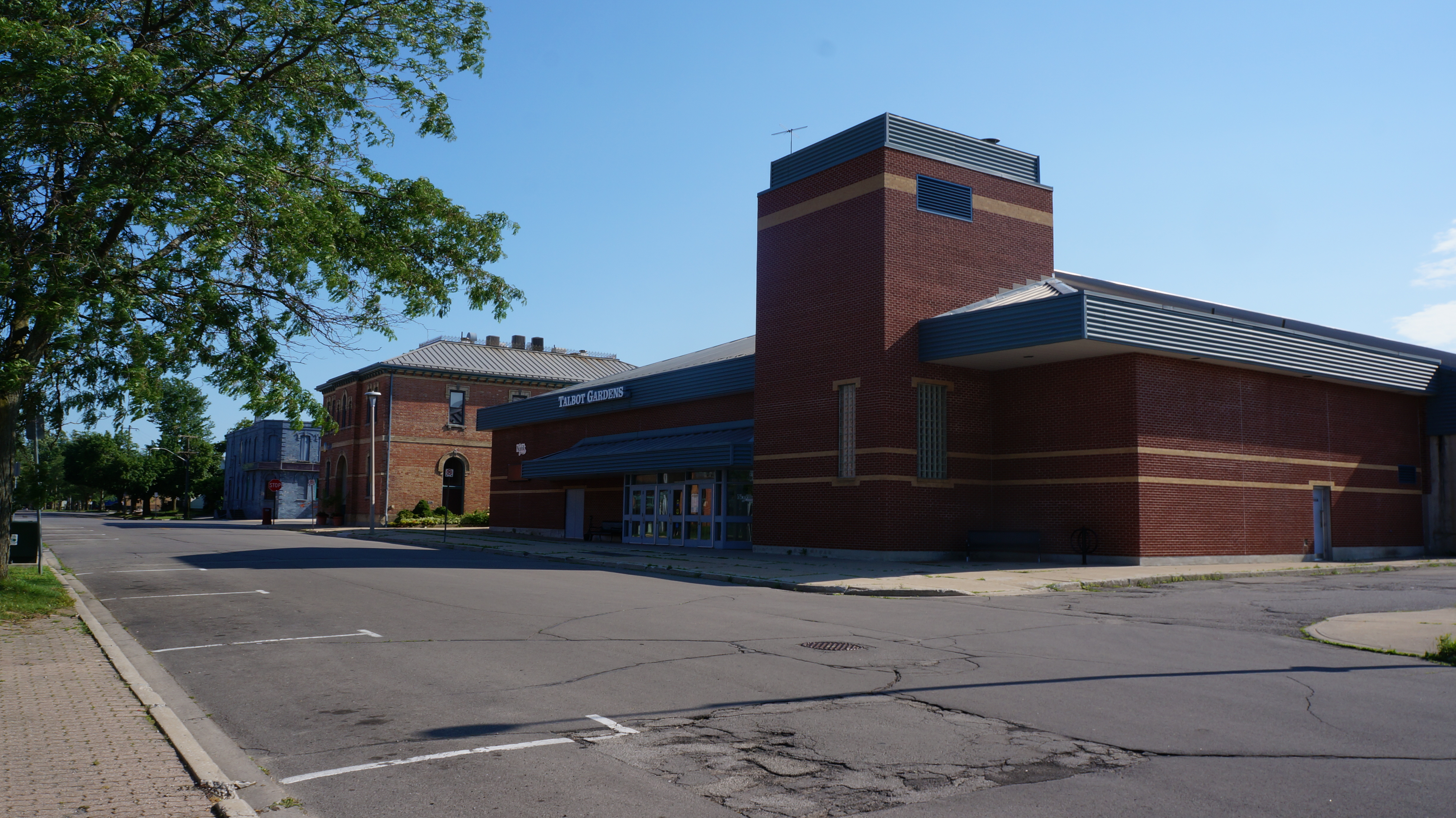
- Interactive map of Talbot Gardens
- Location: 10 Talbot Street North, Simcoe, Ontario, Canada
- Owner: The Municipality of Norfolk County
- Operator: The Municipality of Norfolk County
- Capacity: approx. 1,000

Construction
- Opened: 1946
- Cost: > $1,000,000

Tenant
- Simcoe Storm/Shamrocks (NJCHL) (1989–2018)

The Talbot Gardens is a hockey arena in the Canadian community of Simcoe, Ontario. Opened in 1946, Talbot Gardens played a role in filling a need for ice hockey in North America, in addition to other sports that could be played indoors during the summer months.

== Summary ==
Certain hockey games pertaining to the former Simcoe Shamrocks were broadcast on Community Cable Channel 5 during the weekends. During the 1990s, the arena was given a facelift to look more like Maple Leaf Gardens (the former home of the Toronto Maple Leafs). Thus, the architecture was re-arranged and the arena received a new coat of paint. Local sponsors (most notably Tim Hortons) have always decorated the scoreboard in addition to the interior of the hockey arena. Roller hockey is a featured attraction in the summer and is played by children as a practice game for the winter ice hockey games. Hockey season at Talbot Gardens typically lasts from September 1 (just before Canadian Labour Day) to April 15.

Part of the arena is also home to a preschool, which replaced the Campbell Clark Preschool.

On September 12, 2012, Talbot Gardens was the venue for the construction dispute involving the renovation of Ontario provincial Highway 3 from Simcoe to neighboring Delhi. A mixed-gender charity hockey game has become a Family Day tradition at Talbot Gardens, allowing spouses to play alongside each other in a non-competitive environment.
