= Felix Watts =

Felix John Watts (August 4, 1892 - August 17, 1966) was an accomplished inventor with several U.S. patents granted for items such as motion picture projectors, vehicle ignition systems, light switches, and locking mechanisms.

== Early years ==
Felix Watts was born in Windsor, Ontario to Samuel Watts and Elizabeth Mills. After the death of his mother Elizabeth (daughter of David Mills, Canadian politician) in 1907, his father moved the family to Port Huron, Michigan. After high school, Felix attended the University of Michigan where he was an engineering major and captain of the school's international soccer team.

== Inventing years ==
During his years of invention, Felix worked primarily in the electrical and automotive industries and sold many of his inventions to Henry Ford, whom he became close friends with.

== Death ==
Felix died as a result of a stroke in Yale, Michigan a few months after the death of his wife Sarah Dunford.
