= Toronto Tomahawks =

The Toronto Tomahawks were a team in the original National Lacrosse League. The Tomahawks played their home games at Maple Leaf Gardens during the league's first season in 1974 and compiled a 17–23 record. This placed them fifth out of six teams in the NLL and out of the playoffs. Following the completion of the season, the Tomahawks were sold and received league approval to move the team to Nassau Veterans Memorial Coliseum in Long Island, New York. However, ultimately it was decided to relocate the team to Boston to become the Boston Bolts for the start of the 1975 NLL season, with the Rochester Griffins becoming the Long Island Tomahawks.
