= Quebec Caribous =

The Quebec Caribous (or Les Caribous), were a member of the National Lacrosse League. The franchise was originally the Syracuse Stingers, founded in 1974 with the creation of the league. They played their first and only season in Quebec in 1975 and won the Nations Cup, defeating their provincial rivals, the Montreal Quebecois, in a best-of-seven final series. The league disbanded on Friday, February 13, 1976, due to three of the six teams going bankrupt (among other issues).
