= James Bondy =

Canadian entertainer

- Born: 1974 (age 51–52); Windsor, Ontario, Canada
- Occupations: Actor, singer, dancer
- Years active: 1993-present

James Bondy (born c. 1974) is a Canadian entertainer who co-hosted Ribert and Robert's Wonderworld, a children's show that aired on public television from 2005 to 2008.

== Early life ==
Bondy had aspirations to become a hockey player or a dentist while in school, and is a Toronto Maple Leaves fan.

His high school drama coach encouraged him to try out for a school play, He was cast as a lead and starred in every school play throughout school up until his graduation. In 1993, Bondy was accepted into the musical theater degree program at the University of Windsor from which he graduated. Key roles on the college stage, in local repertory productions, and the Windsor Light Opera Company followed, and Bondy eventually relocated to Toronto in 1997 to pursue a professional career.

== Career ==
Bondy was chosen to help open the Disney's Animal Kingdom at Walt Disney World by starring in a production of Disney's Journey into the Jungle Book. After over 800 performances, Bondy returned to Windsor, Ontario, where he performed in sold-out revues at the casinos in Windsor and across the Detroit River in Detroit. Bondy performed on Renaissance Cruises, headlining musical revues until the September 11 attacks forced him to return to Toronto.

Bondy then gained experience in film, working as an extra, until he returned to performing aboard cruise ships in 2003, performing for six months on Norwegian Cruise Line. During this time aboard the cruise line, Bondy was approached by the creator of a new children's show who had seen Bondy perform and recruited him to co-host his show. When Bondy's contract with the cruise line expired, he began filming episodes of the live-action/animated series Ribert and Robert's Wonderworld. The series was picked up by American Public Television and was seen on over 100 public television stations in North America. Bondy filmed 78 episodes.

In 2004, Bondy recorded an album of Broadway tunes and soft hits, Songs From the Heart.

He continues to perform in New York City as a guitar and solo vocalist.

== Personal life ==
Bondy met his wife while she was working as a dancer aboard the cruise ship, they lived together in New York City.
