= Boston Bolts (lacrosse) =

The Boston Bolts were a member of the National Lacrosse League (1974-75) which is unrelated to the modern National Lacrosse League. The franchise was originally known as the Toronto Tomahawks who were founded in 1974 with the creation of the league. They played their first and only season in Boston in 1975. The league disbanded due to 3 of the 6 teams going bankrupt (among other issues) before the start of the 1976 season.

There were no other professional lacrosse teams playing out of Boston until the Boston Blazers of the MILL in 1992. Currently, there is only one professional lacrosse team that calls Boston home, the Boston Cannons of the MLL.
