= Montreal Quebecois =

Lacrosse league in Quebec, Canada

The Montreal Quebecois was a team part of the original National Lacrosse League. They played their home games at the Montreal Forum. Investors included NHL player John Ferguson Sr. and Nelson Stoll. The roster included Major League Soccer coach Bruce Arena.
