= Ribert and Robert's Wonderworld =

- Genre: Educational
- Presented by: James Bondy; Jessikah Lopez
- Country of origin: United States
- Original language: English
- No. of seasons: 4
- No. of episodes: 78

Production
- Running time: 26 minutes
- Production companies: Deos Animation Studios; American Public Television

Original release
- Network: Syndication
- Release: September 4, 2005 – November 30, 2008

Ribert and Robert's Wonderworld is a children's education animated/live-action hybrid television series that was created by Mike DeVitto. The series aired for seventy-eight episodes from 2005 to 2008.

== Premise ==
The series revolves around Ribert, a young animated toad that wears a cap and later a safety helmet, who wants to know "everything", and Robert, his human friend, as they spend each episode learning about different topics against the backdrop of a magical island theme park, known as Wonderworld. The show's tagline is: The first show a kid can ride!

== Format ==
Each episode follows a general format, concentrating on a single topic. Ribert is curious by nature, and he "wants to know everything", according to a song at the start of each episode. Robert is his best friend and partner. He pilots the roller coaster car that Ribert and the viewers (known as Power Pals) ride as they learn about the day's topic.

Ribert tells Robert what he wants to learn about that day. Subjects have included birthdays, dinosaurs, "being safe" and "being a good friend". Robert turns on the roller coaster car, and Ribert and the viewers prepare for the journey.

The goal of each episode is to solve three "challenges" as the roller coaster car travels the track in the Wonderworld amusement park. Three times over the course of the episode, Robert asks the Power Pals a question, and once it is answered correctly, the Power Pals are given a "magic key". Each key has a human face painted in it, and the respective keys are called in order: Jen, Lee and Tiffany. When the roller coaster car arrives at a door, Ribert asks each "magic key" to open a door for him in song, and the viewers are treated to a visit by human "friends", who perform a skit or task describing the day's subject matter. One of the doors is usually occupied by Cousin Chris, who draws a picture related to the day's topic. After each presentation, Ribert and Robert discuss it together before the roller coaster car moves onto the next challenge.

After all three "magic keys" are obtained, a "secret word" is revealed that is in line with the day's subject. Clues to the "secret word" are provided to the Power Pals during the course of the episode. Upon the completion of the mission, Ribert and Robert bid farewell in song.

== Broadcast ==
The series was distributed in the United States by American Public Television to over 90 local public television stations, most affiliated with PBS. The first season premiered on September 4, 2005, and the final season ended November 30, 2008. Reruns were available for broadcast through 2016.

== Episodes ==
=== Season 1 (2005–06) ===
No. overall	No. in season	Title	Original release date	Prod. code
1	1	"Ribert Wants to Know About Colors"	September 4, 2005	101
2	2	"Ribert Wants to Know About the First Day of School"	September 11, 2005	102
3	3	"Ribert Wants to Know About Numbers"	September 18, 2005	103
4	4	"Ribert Wants to Know About Going to the Doctor"	September 25, 2005	104
5	5	"Ribert Wants to Know About Bugs"	October 2, 2005	105
6	6	"Ribert Wants to Know About Being a Good Friend"	October 9, 2005	106
7	7	"Ribert Wants to Know About Dinosaurs"	October 16, 2005	107
8	8	"Ribert Wants to Know About Being a Good Sport"	October 23, 2005	108
9	9	"Ribert Wants to Know About Music"	October 30, 2005	109
10	10	"Ribert Wants to Know About Being Afraid of the Dark"	November 6, 2005	110
11	11	"Ribert Wants to Know About Family"	November 13, 2005	111
12	12	"Ribert Wants to Know About Having Fun on a Rainy Day"	November 20, 2005	112
13	13	"Ribert Wants to Know About Animals"	November 27, 2005	113
14	1	"Ribert Wants to Know About Games"	December 4, 2005	201
15	2	"Ribert Wants to Know About Pets"	December 11, 2005	202
16	3	"Ribert Wants to Know About Being Healthy"	December 18, 2005	203
17	4	"Ribert Wants to Know About Magic"	December 25, 2005	204
18	5	"Ribert Wants to Know About Outer Space"	January 1, 2006	205
19	6	"Ribert Wants to Know About Having Good Manners"	January 8, 2006	206
20	7	"Ribert Wants to Know About Dancing"	January 15, 2006	207
21	8	"Ribert Wants to Know About Building Things"	January 22, 2006	208
22	9	"Ribert Wants to Know About Art"	January 29, 2006	209
23	10	"Ribert Wants to Know About Sharing"	February 5, 2006	210
24	11	"Ribert Wants to Know About a New Brother or Sister"	February 12, 2006	211
25	12	"Ribert Wants to Know About Science"	February 19, 2006	212
26	13	"Ribert Wants to Know About Weather"	February 26, 2006	213

=== Season 2 (2006–07) ===
No. overall	No. in season	Title	Original release date	Prod. code
27	1	"Ribert Wants to Know About: The Beach"	September 3, 2006	301
28	2	"Ribert Wants to Know About: Arts and Crafts"	September 10, 2006	302
29	3	"Ribert Wants to Know About: The Earth"	September 17, 2006	303
30	4	"Ribert Wants to Know About: History"	September 24, 2006	304
31	5	"Ribert Wants to Know About: Hobbies"	October 1, 2006	305
32	6	"Ribert Wants to Know About: Meeting New People"	October 8, 2006	306
33	7	"Ribert Wants to Know About: Moving"	October 15, 2006	307
34	8	"Ribert Wants to Know About: When I Grow Up"	October 22, 2006	308
35	9	"Ribert Wants to Know About: Having Fun Outside"	October 29, 2006	309
36	10	"Ribert Wants to Know About: Travel"	November 5, 2006	310
37	11	"Ribert Wants to Know About: Writing Stories"	November 12, 2006	311
38	12	"Ribert Wants to Know About: Playing Safely"	November 19, 2006	312
39	13	"Ribert Wants to Know About: Reading"	November 26, 2006	313
40	14	"Ribert Wants to Know About: Birthdays"	December 3, 2006	314
41	15	"Ribert Wants to Know About: Nature"	December 10, 2006	315
42	16	"Ribert Wants to Know About: Imagination"	December 17, 2006	316
43	17	"Ribert Wants to Know About: Math"	December 24, 2006	317
44	18	"Ribert Wants to Know About: Rhyming"	December 31, 2006	318
45	19	"Ribert Wants to Know About: The Sun"	January 7, 2007	319
46	20	"Ribert Wants to Know About: Books"	January 14, 2007	320
47	21	"Ribert Wants to Know About: The Calendar"	January 21, 2007	321
48	22	"Ribert Wants to Know About: Shapes"	January 28, 2007	322
49	23	"Ribert Wants to Know About: The Desert"	February 4, 2007	323
50	24	"Ribert Wants to Know About: Teachers"	February 11, 2007	324
51	25	"Ribert Wants to Know About: Geography"	February 18, 2007	325
52	26	"Ribert Wants to Know About: Drawing"	February 25, 2007	326

=== Season 3 (2007) ===
No. overall	No. in season	Title	Original release date	Prod. code
53	1	"Ribert Wants to Know About: Reptiles"	September 2, 2007	401
54	2	"Ribert Wants to Know About: Camping"	September 9, 2007	402
55	3	"Ribert Wants to Know About: City"	September 16, 2007	403
56	4	"Ribert Wants to Know About: Winter"	September 23, 2007	404
57	5	"Ribert Wants to Know About: Fire Safety"	September 30, 2007	405
58	6	"Ribert Wants to Know About: The Farm"	October 7, 2007	406
59	7	"Ribert Wants to Know About: Ocean Life"	October 14, 2007	407
60	8	"Ribert Wants to Know About: Feelings"	October 21, 2007	408
61	9	"Ribert Wants to Know About: Planes, Trains and Automobiles"	October 28, 2007	409
62	10	"Ribert Wants to Know About: The Moon"	November 4, 2007	410
63	11	"Ribert Wants to Know About: Big & Little"	November 11, 2007	411
64	12	"Ribert Wants to Know About: The Rainforest"	November 18, 2007	412
65	13	"Ribert Wants to Know About: The Garden"	November 25, 2007	413

=== Season 4 (2008) ===
No. overall	No. in season	Title	Original release date	Prod. code
66	1	"Ribert Wants to Know About: Fairytales"	September 7, 2008	501
67	2	"Ribert Wants to Know About: Community Helpers"	September 14, 2008	502
68	3	"Ribert Wants to Know About: The Dentist"	September 21, 2008	503
69	4	"Ribert Wants to Know About: Inventions"	September 28, 2008	504
70	5	"Ribert Wants to Know About: Fruits and Vegetables"	October 5, 2008	505
71	6	"Ribert Wants to Know About: Microscopes and Telescopes"	October 12, 2008	506
72	7	"Ribert Wants to Know About: The Five Senses"	October 19, 2008	507
73	8	"Ribert Wants to Know About: The Playground"	October 26, 2008	508
74	9	"Ribert Wants to Know About: Baby Animals"	November 2, 2008	509
75	10	"Ribert Wants to Know About: The Summer"	November 9, 2008	510
76	11	"Ribert Wants to Know About: Opposites"	November 16, 2008	511
77	12	"Ribert Wants to Know About: The Zoo"	November 23, 2008	512
78	13	"Ribert Wants to Know About: Computers"	November 30, 2008	513

== Cast ==
- Ribert - voiced by Jessikah Lopez
- Robert - James Bondy
- Cousin Chris - Chris Allard
- Magic Matt (magician) - Matt Roberts
- Dara Duck - Dara Bourne
- Leeny (the story performer) - Leeny Del Seamonds
- Vanessa (dance partner) - Vanessa Logan
- Joan and Friends - Joan Kennedy, Jeffery McIlwain, Con Fullam, Grace Katherine Stacey
- Professor Expound - Mark Scalia
- Erin (the game girl) - Erin Horne
- Kids' voices - Luis Branco Jr., Rachel Estremera and Nicole Branco
- Nonni - CJ Gagliola Hughes

=== Principal crew ===
- Created, Produced and Directed by Mike DeVitto
- Written by Mike DeVitto and Jenn DeVitto
- Executive Producers - Mike DeVitto, Con Fullam and Greg Gormican
- Music and Sound - Michael McInnis
- Live-Action Supervision - Jamie Norton and Mike DeVitto
- Technical Director - Jim Grotto
- Animation Director - Jamie Norton and Melissa Napier
- Creative Director - Chris Allard
- Design and Support - Dick Campbell and Dennis Gilbert
- Sound recorded at Michael McInnis Productions, Portland, Maine
- Songs by Paul Conway Fullam and Michael McInnis
- Presented by Deos Animation Studios and American Public Television
