= National Lacrosse League (1974–1975) =

National Lacrosse League (1974–75)
- Sport: Box lacrosse
- Founded: 1974
- Ceased: 1975
- No. of teams: 6
- Countries: United States; Canada
- Last champion: Quebec Caribous

The National Lacrosse League was a box lacrosse league that lasted two seasons: 1974 and 1975. It is not related to the current National Lacrosse League.

Originally conceived by hockey owners as a means to fill their arenas in the summer months, the league was not very successful, with only Philadelphia and Montreal drawing sizeable crowds. The league folded in 1976 after the demise of several franchises and the inability of the Montreal franchise to play home games in 1976 because of the Summer Olympics.

Like the current NLL, the majority of the league's players were from Canada.

Besides featuring NHL players such as Rick Dudley (Rochester) and Doug Favell (Philadelphia), the league also included Bruce Arena (Montreal)—who went on to greater fame as the head coach of the United States men's national soccer team.

== History ==
The type of play during this short-early lived era of the NLL was a faster paced game, played more like an NHL style as opposed to the basketball style of the current league. Equipment differences include no face guards and wooden sticks. The 1976 season was cancelled due to three of the six teams going bankrupt and the Montreal team having to go two months without a home game because the 1976 Olympics would be using the Montreal Forum for boxing. After the 1975 season, there would not be another professional lacrosse league in North America until the birth of the Eagle Pro Box Lacrosse League in January 1987.

== Teams ==
- Maryland Arrows (1974–1975)
- Montreal Quebecois (1974–1975)
- Philadelphia Wings (1974–1975) ^{1}
- Rochester Griffins (1974)/Long Island Tomahawks (1975) ^{2}
- Syracuse Stingers (1974)/Quebec Caribous (1975)
- Toronto Tomahawks (1974) ^{2}/Boston Bolts (1975)

^{1}The Philadelphia Wings in this league are not related to the modern Philadelphia Wings of the modern National Lacrosse League.
^{2}The 1974 Toronto team and the 1975 Long Island team had the same name (Tomahawks), but they were separate franchises.

== Champions ==
Year	Champion	Runner-up	Games
1974	Rochester Griffins	Philadelphia Wings	4-2
1975	Quebec Caribous	Montreal Québécois	4-2

== 1975 season ==
=== Final standings ===
Team	W	L	T	PCT	GB	GF	GA	P
Long Island Tomahawks	31	17	0	.646	-	802	702	62
Montreal Quebecois	24	24	0	.500	7	643	649	48
Boston Bolts	22	24	2	.479	8	735	741	46
Quebec Caribous	22	24	2	.479	8	729	694	46
Philadelphia Wings	21	25	2	.458	9	690	713	44
Maryland Arrows	21	27	0	.438	10	670	770	42

==== Playoffs ====
Semifinals
1	Long Island	2
4	**Quebec**	**4**
2	**Montreal**	**4**
3	Boston	3

Finals
4	**Quebec**	**4**
2	Montreal	2

=== Top Ten Scorers ===
Name	Hometown	Games	Goals	Assists	Points	Pen. Min.
Doug Hayes	Long Island	**48**	104	126	**230**	52
Paul Suggate	Maryland	**48**	92	127	219	**71**
John Davis	Montreal	**48**	79	**129**	208	16
Ivan Thompson	Boston	46	91	116	207	45
Dave Durante	Quebec	**48**	89	117	206	22
Brian Tasker	Maryland	**48**	73	125	198	58
John Grant, Sr.	Philadelphia	47	64	134	198	52
Terry Lloyd	Philadelphia	**48**	**113**	56	169	54
Jim J. J. Johnston	Long Island	38	79	87	166	26
Jan Magee	Long Island	47	57	103	160	49
***Bold** indicates leader in category

== See also ==
- National Lacrosse Association
