= Canadian Lacrosse League =

Canadian Lacrosse League may refer to:

- Canadian Lacrosse League (2011), a defunct men's lacrosse league established in 2011
- Canadian Lacrosse League (2016), a junior lacrosse league established in 2016
