= World Junior Lacrosse Championship =

IIJL World Junior Lacrosse Championship
- Sport: Box lacrosse
- Founded: 2015
- No. of teams: 6
- Countries: Invitational
- Most recent champion: United States (3rd title)
- Most titles: Canada (6 titles)
- Website: IIJL.org
- 2025 IIJL World Junior Lacrosse Championship

The IIJL World Junior Lacrosse Championship (WJLC) is an annual independent international box lacrosse championship for players aged 21 and under.

== History ==
The first formal Junior competition was held in 2015 in Six Nations, ON. Originally, the Junior tournament was to be held in conjunction with the World Indoor Lacrosse Championship in Buffalo, NY. However, when Buffalo was removed from the 2015 WILC as one of two host locations – all games moved to Syracuse/Onondaga Nation, the Junior tournament was removed. With international team flights planned, the Junior Tournament was moved to Six Nations, ON and named the 2015 U-19 World Lacrosse Challenge and featured 12 teams, including regional squads from Canada and Iroquois. Junior national teams from Czech Republic, Israel, and the United States along with German club Deutschland Adler rounded out the field. Canada West won the gold medal game defeating Canada CLax Junior All-Stars, while Iroquois West captured the bronze medal.

International Indoor Junior Lacrosse purchased the rights to the tournament in 2016 and it was rebranded to its current name the IIJL World Junior Lacrosse Championship. Eight teams would compete in the second edition which was again held at Iroquois Lacrosse Arena. Czech Republic and United States returned along with newcomer Ireland. Iroquois West would defeat the Canada CLax Junior All-Stars 9–8 in the gold medal game while Iroquois Grand River took bronze on their home floor.

After a one-year hiatus the tournament return in 2018 and take place in Saskatoon at SaskTel Centre. For the first time in the championship's history each country would be represented by individual teams. Three teams took part (Canada, Iroquois, United States) in the four-day event with Canada winning its second gold medal.

The event returned to Ontario in 2019 – this time in Mississauga at Paramount Fine Foods Centre. The championship doubled in size from three to six countries. Australia would make its debut at the tournament, one of six national teams.

The 2021 IIJL Word Junior Lacrosse Championship was a cumulative goal three game series against Canada East and Canada West due to the global pandemic resulting in other countries not being able to travel or restrictions that prevented them from participating. Games aired live on TSN 2 and TSN Direct. Games were played at Canada Life Centre in Winnipeg, Manitoba, but were closed to the public due to ongoing COVID-19 restrictions.

The 2022 IIJL Word Junior Lacrosse Championship took place in again Winnipeg at Canada Life Centre and returned to its full formate of six (6) team with Australia, Canada, Haudenosaunee, Israel, Poland, and the United States competing. Games aired live on TSN 2 and TSN Direct.

The 2023 IIJL Word Junior Lacrosse Championship returned to Saskatoon, Saskatchewan at SaskTel Centre with Australia, Canada, Israel, Poland, and the United States competing, along with newcomer Scotland. Games aired live on TSN Direct.

In 2024, the IIJL Word Junior Lacrosse Championship took place outside of Canadian borders for the first time in the tournament's history, in Erie, Pennsylvania at Erie Insurance Arena. Five (5) teams competed; Australia, Canada, Poland, Scotland, and the United States.

== Champions ==
Year	(gold) Gold	(silver) Silver	Result	(bronze) Bronze	Fourth	Result	Host arena
2015	Canada West	Canada CLax	5–4	Iroquois West	United States	13–7	Iroquois Lacrosse Arena
2016	Iroquois West	Canada CLax	9–8	Iroquois Grand River	Canada West	10–5	Iroquois Lacrosse Arena
2018	Canada	Iroquois	15–10	United States	---	---	SaskTel Centre
2019	Canada	Iroquois	12–8	United States	Israel	13–12; OT	Paramount Fine Foods Centre
2021	Canada East	Canada West	+15	---	---	---	Canada Life Centre
2022	Canada	Haudenosaunee	16–9	United States	Israel	15–3	Canada Life Centre
2023	United States	Canada	10–7	Israel	Scotland	19–12	SaskTel Centre
2024	Canada	Scotland	18–9	United States	Poland	18–5	Erie Insurance Arena
2025	United States	Scotland	9–8	Canada	Australia	20–12	Slush Puppie Place
2026	United States	Canada	10–9	Haudenosaunee	Poland	9–8	Centennial Regional Arena
2027							

== Performance by team ==
Team	2015 (Canada) (12)	2016 (Haudenosaunee) (8)	2018 (Canada) (3)	2019 (Canada) (6)	2021 (Canada) (2)	2022 (Canada) (6)	2023 (United States) (6)	2024 (Canada) (5)	2025 (United States) (4)	2026 (United States) (5)	2027 (-)
Australia				6th		6th	6th	5th	4th	5th	
Canada	1st	2nd	1st	1st	1st	1st	2nd	1st	3rd	2nd	
(Czech Republic) Czechia	5th	7th									
Germany	8th										
Haudenosaunee	3rd	1st	2nd	2nd		2nd				3rd	
(Republic of Ireland) Ireland		5th									
Israel	12th			4th		4th	3rd				
Poland				5th		5th	5th	4th		4th	
Scotland							4th	2nd	2nd		
(Sweden) (Finland) (Norway) Team Nordic	11th										
United States	4th	8th	3rd	3rd		3rd	1st	3rd	1st	1st	

Years with multiple teams from same country show highest seed placement.
