= CAA Centre =

Arena in Brampton, Ontario, Canada

Coordinates: 43.66701°N 79.70866°W

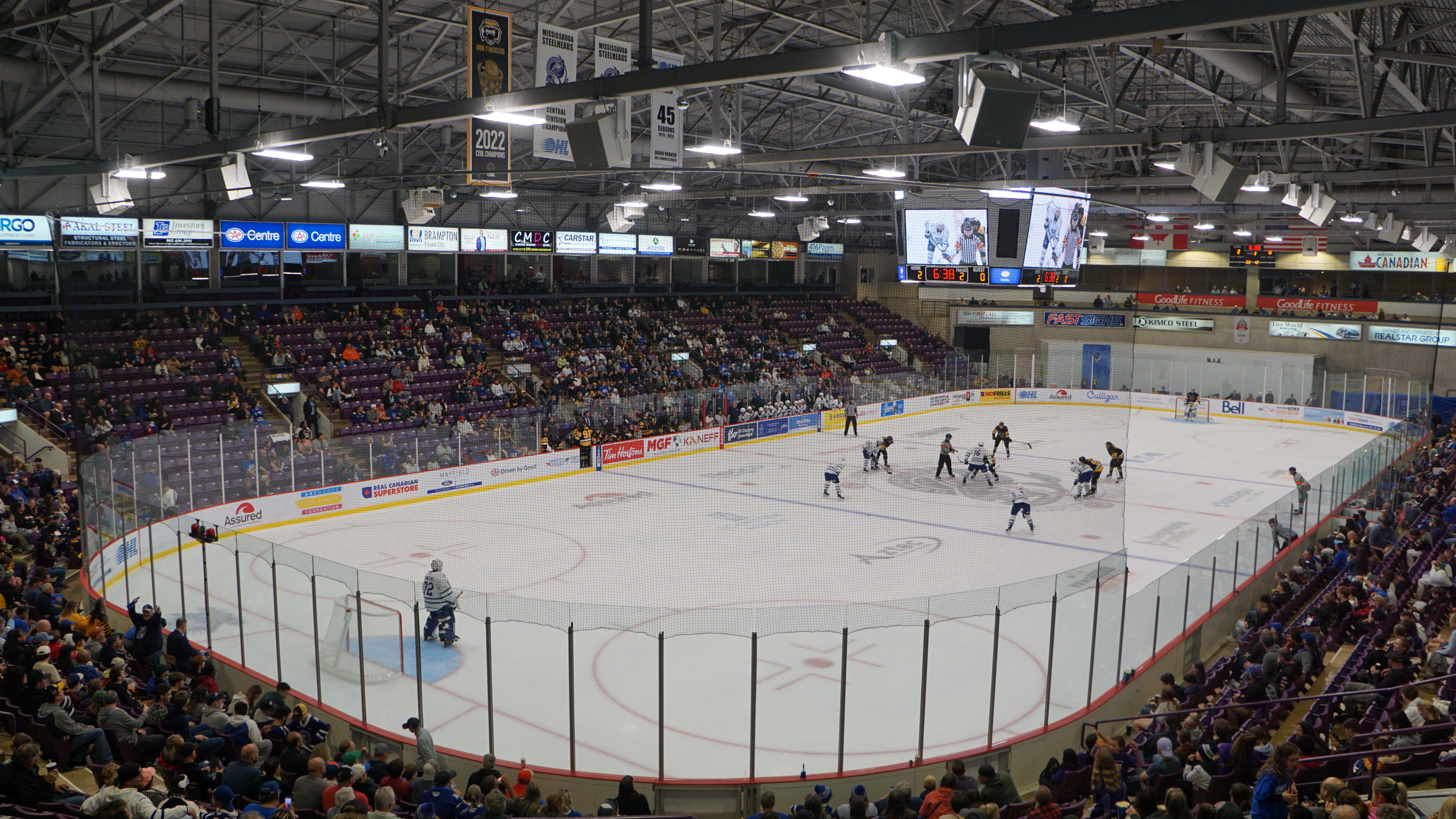
- The Brampton Steelheads playing the Brantford Bulldogs in their home opener for the 2024-2025 OHL season.
- Interactive map of CAA Centre
- Former names: Brampton Centre for Sports and Entertainment (1998–2005); Powerade Centre (2005–2018)
- Location: 7575 Kennedy Road; Brampton, ON
- Owner: City of Brampton
- Operator: Realstar, Inc.
- Capacity: Hockey or basketball 5,000; Concerts 3,800
- Surface: Multi-surface

Construction
- Groundbreaking: June 1997
- Opened: September 11, 1998
- Cost: $26.5 million
- Architects: Brisbin Brook Beynon, Architects
- General contractor: Edilcan Construction Corporation

Tenants
- Brampton Excelsiors (MSL) (1999–2014); Brampton Excelsiors (OJALL) (1999–2014); Brampton Battalion (OHL) (1998–2013); Bramalea Blues (OPJHL) (2008–2010); Brampton Inferno (CLax) (2012–2013); Peel Avengers (CLax) (2012); Brampton Beast (ECHL) (2013–2020); Brampton A's (NBL Canada) (2013–2015); Brampton Honey Badgers (CEBL) (2023–present); Brampton Steelheads (OHL) (2024–present)

The CAA Centre (formerly the Brampton Centre for Sports & Entertainment and the Powerade Centre) is a 5,000-seat multi-purpose arena in Brampton, Ontario, Canada. It was built in 1998, and officially opened the same year on October 7. In 2023, the arena became home to the Brampton Honey Badgers of the Canadian Elite Basketball League. In April 2023, it hosted the 2023 IIHF Women's World Championship. It is also home to the new tenants, the Brampton Steelheads of the Ontario Hockey League as of May 2024. It was previously home to the Brampton Battalion of the Ontario Hockey League, the Brampton Beast of the ECHL, and the Brampton Excelsiors lacrosse teams.

In the main arena, the seats are purple, with private suites located around the top of seating area. The club seats are on the penalty box side of the arena. There is a video scoreboard that was added for the Brampton Beast's inaugural season. The concourse is horseshoe-shaped. It is located at 7575 Kennedy Road, on the south side of the city, between Steeles Avenue and Highway 407.

The main arena is part of the Brampton Sports Complex that includes three smaller ice pads and outdoor softball diamonds, as well as the TD Cricket Arena which hosted the Global T20 Canada tournament from 2019-2024, The city has proposed to construct a new 20,000 seat cricket stadium for $49 million on the location.
