= Arena Lacrosse League =

Canadian semi-professional box lacrosse league

- Sport: Box Lacrosse
- Founded: 2016
- First season: 2017
- No. of teams: 12
- Most recent champions: East: Six Nations Snipers; West: Grizzlies (2026)
- Most titles: Whitby Steelhawks, Shooting Eagles, Six Nations Snipers (2)
- Related competitions: National Lacrosse League
- Website: ArenaLacrosseLeague.ca

The Arena Lacrosse League (ALL) is a men's box lacrosse minor league based in Canada. The league consists of teams in Ontario and British Columbia. Teams play a 14-game regular season schedule before league playoffs conclude with the ALL Cup.

== History ==
Founded by Paul St. John in the summer of 2016, the ALL began with six teams for their first season in the winter of 2017. Oshawa Outlaws, Paris RiverWolves, Peterborough Timbermen, Six Nations Snipers, St. Catharines Shockwave and Toronto Monarchs were the original six of the ALL.

Oshawa Outlaws defeated the Toronto Monarchs 11–10 in the first league championship game played on April 9, 2017, at Tribute Communities Centre in Oshawa. The Outlaws were the regular season winner with a 10–4 record.

Season two included expansion with the Whitby Steelhawks. Toronto Monarchs finished with a league-best 11–3 regular season, but were eliminated in the semifinals by Whitby who went on to capture the ALL Cup by defeating Paris RiverWolves 12–10 on April 8, 2018, at the Toronto Rock Athletic Centre.

In November 2018 the ALL partnered with the National Lacrosse League. It will serve as a development league for the NLL.

The 2020 ALL season was stopped two weeks prior to the completion of the regular season due to Covid-19 virus. The Whitby Steelhawks were leading at the time of the stoppage and crowned 2020 regular season champions. The 2021 ALL season was wiped out completely by the virus.

Expansion in the west happened prior to the 2022 season when a four-team division was announced. All games to be played at the Langley Events Centre. The four team division was officially named the "ALL West". The two divisions do not play each other.

Prior to the 2022 ALL season the St. Catharines Shockwave officially changed their name to the Ohsweken Bears and continued to play their home game at the Iroquois Lacrosse Arena. With the addition to the ALL West, the Ontario seven team division was officially named "ALL East". The Six Nations Snipers won the 2022 eastern championship, defeating the Steelhawks 16-11, and the Sea Spray claimed the first western title, after beating the Grizzlies 2 games to 1.

The Brampton Express joined the ALL East as an expansion team in 2023, expanding the ALL East Division to eight teams. The Express play their home game at Brampton Memorial Arena in Brampton, Ontario. Toronto and Brampton met in the 2023 championship game, with the Monarchs winning 10-8. The Sea Spray were denied two titles in a row after falling to the Shooting Eagles in the west. An All-Star team from the ALL East played a two game exhibition series against Australia in September 2023. The All-Stars won game 1 22-12, and game 2 21-6.

Both divisions saw no changes prior to the 2024 season. Whitby claimed their 2nd title, beating Oshawa in a tight 14-12 game. The Blackfish swept the Shooting Eagles 2-0 to win their first championship. The 2025 championships were won by Brampton and the Shooting Eagles.

In 2026, the western ALL introduced a new playoff format, with 2nd and 3rd playing a single win and move on game, before a best of three against 1st place to decide the champion. The Shooting Eagles beat the Blackfish 13-12 with a last minute goal, before the 1st place Grizzlies dispatched of them 12-5, and 11-8 to win the series 2-0. The Brampton Express finished top in the east, with a 10-4 record, whilst Oshawa and Paris were the two teams that missed the playoffs. Both Brampton and regular season runner-up Whitby were upset in the semifinals by 6th place Toronto and 5th place Six Nations, respectively, setting up the final between the Monarchs and Snipers. It was not a close contest, and Six Nations thundered to a 14-4 win, and their second championship. For Toronto, this marked the 2nd year in a row that they fell at the last hurdle.

After the completion of the new ARENAS at LEC complex, the western division will play all games there, rather than the Fieldhouse.

During the 2026 offseason, it was announced that three ALL East teams will be moving to Luther Vipond Memorial Arena in Brooklin. The Whitby Steelhawks, Peterborough Timbermen will call the arena home, alongside the former Oshawa Outlaws, now renamed to the Brooklin Bobcats.

=== Women ===
The ALL added a women's division in 2018 with three teams (Lady RiverWolves, Lady Shockwave and Lady Snipers) competing in the first season. All games are contested at the Iroquois Lacrosse Arena. A fourth team (Lady Steelhawks) was added for the 2019 season. Little information is available online about the seasons prior to 2022. In 2022, the Lady Snipers defeated the Lady Steelhawks 5-2 in the final.

The 2023 season included the Riverwolves, Snipers, the newly renamed Bears (all of whom had dropped the 'Lady' moniker) and a new team named the 66erz.The 66erz went undefeated at 12-0 and were crowned champions with no playoffs being played. At the same time as the men's series against Australia, the eastern women's division played a single match against the Aussies, who defeated the Women's ALL 16-4.

The 2024 season saw an overhaul of team identities, with all teams being renamed. The new look ALL Women's East consisted of the Blazers, Firebirds, Sirens, Skyhawks and Cobras. The Skyhawks defeated the Firebirds 6-3 to claim the 2024 championship. A sixth team, the Arrows, joined the league in 2025. The Skyhawks won their 2nd title in a row in 2025, beating the Blazers 6-5. The Firebirds won their first title in 2026, after defeating the Skyhawks 5-3.

A western women's division completed their inaugural season in 2022, with 4 teams (Black, Blue, Purple and White) playing at the Langley Events Centre. Team Blue finished undefeated at 3-0. In 2023, they adopted new identities, and expanded to six teams, named the Hawks, Turtles, Bears, Bats, Flying Squirrels and Deer. The 2024 season saw the inclusion of playoffs, which saw the Flying Squirrels named champions. The Hawks defeated the Flying Squirrels 14-10 to win the 2025 championship. The inaugural WBOX GRIT tournament, held in Port Coquitlam in July 2025, included a team of western All-Stars. The WALL Selects, as they were called, finished 4-0, beating an international selects team 13-0, the women Salmonbellies 10-5, Team WBOX 11-2 and the Aussie Dingoes 13-0. They faced the international selects team for a second time in the tournament final, winning 5-4.

In 2026, the league was downsized to only 4 teams, with the Bears and Bats not participating. The 2026 final was played between the Hawks and the Turtles. The Hawks had the lead late in the game, whilst the Turtles attempted a late push to tie the game. Multiple Turtle shot attempts were blocked in the last 10 seconds and the Hawks prevailed 8-7.

The second addition of the GRIT tournament did not include the defending champions WALL Selects, although many players from the western division played for other teams in the tournament.

The lineup for the 2027 western division changed slightly, with the Bears returning and replacing the Deer, keeping the league at 4 teams.

=== Junior (U-22) ===
The Junior ALL began play in 2020 with five teams (Steelhawks, Timbermen, Outlaws, Bengals and Snipers). The Hamilton Bengals finished top of the standings. No 2021 season was played due to Covid-19.

When the league returned in 2022, the makeup was different, with the Steelhawks and Outlaws being replaced by the Monarchs and K-OS Lacrosse Club. The Snipers defeated the Monarchs 6-4 to win the 2022 championship. The constant shifting continued in 2023, with the Steelhawks and Outlaws returning and being joined by the Express. The Monarchs took the 2023 title, beating the Bengals 6-4.

Another two teams joined in 2024, the Warriors and the Loggers. The Loggers won the championship in their first year, defeating the Outlaws 12-6. The Warriors departed after the 2024 season, being replaced by the Rivals Lacrosse Club and the Orangeville Northmen, bringing the league to 11 teams. The Loggers became the first team to go back to back, claiming the 2025 championship 12-11 over the Express.

Three more teams joined for 2026 (Rusty Gate, Platinum Lacrosse Club and the Hounds), whilst K-OS left the league. The 1st place Steelhawks faced off against the regular season runner up Rusty Gate in the final, with the Steelhawks coming out the victors 12-6.

The ALL announced the creation of a western U-21 division to start play in the 26-27 season. Like the senior and women's divisions, all games would be played at Langley Events Centre. The new division will consist of the junior teams of the 4 ALL West teams.

== Teams ==
ALL teams
| ALL East | Arena | First season | Titles |
|---|---|---|---|
| Brampton Express | Brampton Memorial Arena | 2023 | 1 (2025) |
| Ohsweken Bears (formerly St. Catharines Shockwave) | Iroquois Lacrosse Arena | 2022 (Shockwave -2017) | 1 (2019) |
| Brooklin Bobcats (formerly Oshawa Outlaws) | Luther Vipond Memorial Arena | 2026 (Outlaws - 2017) | 1 (2017) |
| Grand RiverWolves (formerly Paris RiverWolves) | Iroquois Lacrosse Arena | 2026 (Paris - 2017) | |
| Peterborough Timbermen | Luther Vipond Memorial Arena | 2017 | |
| Six Nations Snipers | Iroquois Lacrosse Arena | 2017 | 2 (2022, 2026) |
| Toronto Monarchs | Toronto Rock Athletic Centre | 2017 | 1 (2023) |
| Whitby Steelhawks | Luther Vipond Memorial Arena | 2018 | 2 (2018, 2024) |
| ALL West | Arena | First season | |
| Blackfish Lacrosse Club | Langley Events Centre | 2022 | 1 (2024) |
| Grizzlies Lacrosse Club | Langley Events Centre | 2022 | 1 (2026) |
| Sea Spray Lacrosse Club | Langley Events Centre | 2022 | 1 (2022) |
| Shooting Eagles Lacrosse Club | Langley Events Centre | 2022 | 2 (2023, 2025) |

== ALL Cup ==
ALL Champions
| Season | Winner (Men) | Runner-up (Men) | Result | Winner (Women) | Runner-up (Women) | Result | Winner (Junior) | Runner-up (Junior) | Result |
|---|---|---|---|---|---|---|---|---|---|
| 2017 | Oshawa Outlaws | Toronto Monarchs | 11–10 | --- | --- | --- | --- | --- | --- |
| 2018 | Whitby Steelhawks | Paris RiverWolves | 12–10 | Lady Snipers | Lady Shockwave | | --- | --- | --- |
| 2019 | St. Catharines Shockwave | Paris RiverWolves | 8–6 | Lady RiverWolves | Lady Shockwave | 8–5 | --- | --- | --- |
| 2020 | none (season suspended due to COVID-19) | | | | | | | | |
| 2021 | none (season suspended due to COVID-19) | | | | | | | | |
| 2022 | West: Sea Spray Lacrosse Club | Grizzlies Lacrosse Club | 2–1 (best-of 3) | East: Lady Snipers | Lady Steelhawks | 5–2 | Junior Snipers | Junior Monarchs | 6–4 |
| 2022 | East: Six Nations Snipers | Whitby Steelhawks | 16–11 | West: Team Blue | | | Junior Snipers | Junior Monarchs | 6–4 |
| 2023 | West: Shooting Eagles Lacrosse Club | Sea Spray Lacrosse Club | 2–1 (best-of 3) | East: Ohsweken 66erz | | | Junior Monarchs | Junior Bengals | 6-4 |
| 2023 | East: Toronto Monarchs | Brampton Express | 10–8 | West: Flying Squirrels | | | Junior Monarchs | Junior Bengals | 6-4 |
| 2024 | West: Black Fish Lacrosse Club | Shooting Eagles Lacrosse Club | 2–0 (best-of 3) | West: Flying Squirrels | Bears | 20-13 | Junior Loggers | Junior Outlaws | 12-6 |
| 2024 | East: Whitby Steelhawks | Oshawa Outlaws | 14–12 | East: Skyhawks | Firebirds | 6-3 | Junior Loggers | Junior Outlaws | 12-6 |
| 2025 | West: Shooting Eagles Lacrosse Club | Blackfish Lacrosse Club | 2-0 (best of 3) | West: Hawks | Flying Squirrels | 14-10 | Junior Loggers | Junior Express | 12-11 |
| 2025 | East: Brampton Express | Toronto Monarchs | 14-13 | East: Skyhawks | Blazers | 6-5 | Junior Loggers | Junior Express | 12-11 |
| 2026 | West: Grizzlies Lacrosse Club | Shooting Eagles Lacrosse Club | 2-0 (best of 3) | West: Hawks | Turtles | 8-7 | Junior Steelhawks | Rusty Gate | 12-6 |
| 2026 | East: Six Nations Snipers | Toronto Monarchs | 14-4 | East: Firebirds | Skyhawks | 5-3 | Junior Steelhawks | Rusty Gate | 12-6 |
