= 2015 Buffalo Bandits season =

2015 Buffalo Bandits
- League: NLL
- Division: 3rd East
- 2015 record: 11–7
- Home record: 7–2
- Road record: 4–5
- Goals for: 236
- Goals against: 208
- General Manager: Steve Dietrich
- Coach: Troy Cordingley
- Captain: John Tavares
- Alternate captains: Scott Self
- Arena: First Niagara Center

Team leaders
- Goals: Ryan Benesch (55)
- Assists: Dhane Smith (68)
- Points: Ryan Benesch (113)
- Penalties in minutes: Billy Dee Smith (53)
- Loose Balls: Jay Thorimbert (246)
- Wins: Anthony Cosmo (10)
- Goals against average: Anthony Cosmo (11.31)

The Buffalo Bandits are a lacrosse team based in Buffalo, New York playing in the National Lacrosse League (NLL). The 2015 season was their 24th season in the NLL.

The Bandits finished the season with an 11–7 record, in a stacked East Division, where they finished in 3rd place. They faced their division rival Rochester in the Division Semifinal, where they lost on the road, 14–11.

== Regular season ==
=== Current standings ===
East Division
P	Team	GP	W	L	PCT	GB	Home	Road	GF	GA	Diff	GF/GP	GA/GP
1	Toronto Rock – xyz	18	14	4	.778	0.0	7–2	7–2	230	185	+45	12.78	10.28
2	Rochester Knighthawks – x	18	12	6	.667	2.0	7–2	5–4	205	173	+32	11.39	9.61
3	Buffalo Bandits – x	18	11	7	.611	3.0	7–2	4–5	236	208	+28	13.11	11.56
4	Minnesota Swarm	18	6	12	.333	8.0	3–6	3–6	185	226	−41	10.28	12.56
5	New England Black Wolves	18	4	14	.222	10.0	2–7	2–7	186	249	−63	10.33	13.83

West Division
P	Team	GP	W	L	PCT	GB	Home	Road	GF	GA	Diff	GF/GP	GA/GP
1	Edmonton Rush – xy	18	13	5	.722	0.0	6–3	7–2	241	177	+64	13.39	9.83
2	Colorado Mammoth – x	18	9	9	.500	4.0	6–3	3–6	212	218	−6	11.78	12.11
3	Calgary Roughnecks – x	18	7	11	.389	6.0	4–5	3–6	212	217	−5	11.78	12.06
4	Vancouver Stealth	18	5	13	.278	8.0	3–6	2–7	211	265	−54	11.72	14.72

x: Clinched playoff berth; c: Clinched playoff berth by crossing over to another division; y: Clinched division; z: Clinched best regular season record; GP: Games Played
W: Wins; L: Losses; GB: Games back; PCT: Win percentage; Home: Record at Home; Road: Record on the Road; GF: Goals scored; GA: Goals allowed
Differential: Difference between goals scored and allowed; GF/GP: Average number of goals scored per game; GA/GP: Average number of goals allowed per game

=== Game log ===
Game	Date	Opponent	Location	Score	OT	Attendance	Record
1	January 2, 2015	@ New England Black Wolves	Mohegan Sun Arena	L 8–12		5,768	0–1
2	January 3, 2015	Edmonton Rush	First Niagara Center	W 9–8		14,236	1–1
3	January 17, 2015	@ Vancouver Stealth	Langley Events Centre	W 14–13		3,478	2–1
4	January 23, 2015	@ Toronto Rock	Air Canada Centre	L 11–13		11,413	2–2
5	January 30, 2015	Minnesota Swarm	First Niagara Center	W 15–12		12,756	3–2
6	January 31, 2015	@ Rochester Knighthawks	Blue Cross Arena	L 11–17		6,994	3–3
7	February 7, 2015	@ Calgary Roughnecks	Scotiabank Saddledome	W 15–14	OT	10,312	4–3
8	February 14, 2015	Rochester Knighthawks	First Niagara Center	L 10–15		14,737	4–4
9	February 21, 2015	@ Rochester Knighthawks	Blue Cross Arena	L 12–13	OT	6,669	4–5
10	February 28, 2015	Colorado Mammoth	First Niagara Center	W 14–11		14,669	5–5
11	March 13, 2015	Toronto Rock	First Niagara Center	W 15–12		12,903	6–5
12	March 14, 2015	@ Toronto Rock	Air Canada Centre	L 10–11	OT	11,460	6–6
13	March 21, 2015	Minnesota Swarm	First Niagara Center	W 12–8		14,601	7–6
14	April 4, 2015	New England Black Wolves	First Niagara Center	L 11–12		13,674	7–7
15	April 11, 2015	@ Minnesota Swarm	Xcel Energy Center	W 12–9		8,986	8–7
16	April 25, 2015	Vancouver Stealth	First Niagara Center	W 17–9		15,897	9–7
17	April 26, 2015	@ New England Black Wolves	Mohegan Sun Arena	W 20–9		3,036	10–7
18	May 2, 2015	New England Black Wolves	First Niagara Center	W 20–10		15,374	11–7

=== Playoffs ===
The post season for the Bandits began as the third best record in the east, qualifying them for the division semifinal. The tone was set early on by the host Rochester Knighthawks, who led 5-2 after one period. The game would be relatively even the rest of the game but the three goal margin from the first was the difference in the game and sent Buffalo back west along the Interstate 90. In what would be his last game for the Bandits and in professional lacrosse, John Tavares registered five assists.

==== Game log ====
Game	Date	Opponent	Location	Score	OT	Attendance	Record
Division Semifinal	May 8, 2015	@ Rochester Knighthawks	Blue Cross Arena	L 11–14		6,527	0–1

== Roster ==
2015 Buffalo Bandits roster
Active (21-man) roster		Inactive roster	Coaches
Goaltenders: 44 (Canada) Anthony Cosmo; 65 (Canada) Davide DiRuscio; Defensemen: 23 (Canada) Steve Priolo; 3 (Canada) Billy Dee Smith; 7 (Canada) Derek Suddons	Forwards: 17 (Canada) Ryan Benesch; 19 (Canada) Chad Culp; 92 (Canada) Dhane Smith; 9 (Canada) Mark Steenhuis; 11 (Canada) John Tavares (C); 2 (Haudenosaunee) Jerome Thompson; Transition: 13 (Canada) David Brock; 8 (Canada) Kevin Brownell; 71 (Canada) Brandon Goodwin; 66 (Haudenosaunee) Alex Kedoh Hill; 75 (Canada) Jay Thorimbert; 22 (Canada) Andrew Watt; 20 (Canada) Nick Weiss; 55 (Canada) Mitch Wilde	Practice squad: 15 (Canada) Matthew Bennett (T); 93 (Canada) Jordan Dance (F); 21 (Canada) Tyler Ferreira (F); 91 (Canada) Corey Fowler (F); Injured reserve: 90 (Canada) Jamie Rooney (F); Holdout: 12 (Canada) Drew Petkoff (D); 40 (Canada) Adam Will (T)	Head coach {{{Head Coach}}} Legend: * Suspended list; (C) Captain; (A) Alternate captain; Roster updated 2013-3-16; NLL Transactions

== Player stats ==
Player	GP	G	A	Pts	LB	PIM
Ryan Benesch	18	55	58	113	99	6
Dhane Smith	18	39	68	107	75	11
Mark Steenhuis	17	36	59	95	68	25
Alexander-Kedoh-Hill	18	23	26	49	101	30
Chad Culp	16	11	25	36	62	24
John Tavares	10	12	20	32	22	6
Jerome Thompson	13	10	14	24	35	12
Joe Resetarits	10	7	14	21	34	4
Steve Priolo	18	5	15	20	104	48
Kevin Brownell	18	6	13	19	79	11
Totals		236	370	606	1,278	344

=== Goaltenders ===
Player	GP	MIN	W	L	GA	Sv%	GAA
Anthony Cosmo	17	1,013:41	10	7	191	.781	11.31
Davide DiRuscio	14	75:45	1	0	15	.754	11.88
Totals		1,089:26	11	7	206	.779	11.35

== Transactions ==
=== Trades ===
September 22, 2014	To Buffalo Bandits Nick Weiss; 9th overall selection, 2014 entry draft 2nd round selection, 2015 entry draft 1st round selection, 2018 entry draft	To Vancouver Stealth Rory Smith; Eric Penney; 12th overall selection, 2014 entry draft
September 22, 2014	To Buffalo Bandits 49th selection, 2014 entry draft	To New England Black Wolves 6th round selection, 2016 entry draft

=== Entry Draft ===
The 2014 NLL Entry Draft took place on September 22, 2014. The Bandits made the following selections:

Round	Overall	Player	College/Club
1	9	Brandon Goodwin	
2	14	Matthew Bennett	
2	18	Tyler Ferreira	
3	24	Jordan Dance	
6	49	Mike Melnychenko	

== See also ==
- 2015 NLL season
