= Iroquois Ironmen =

Canadian indoor lacrosse team

- Founded: 2012
- League: Canadian Lacrosse League
- Team history: Folded after 2013 season
- Based in: Ohsweken, Ontario
- Arena: Iroquois Lacrosse Arena
- Colours: Purple and White
- Website: Official website

Iroquois Ironmen were a Canadian professional indoor lacrosse team that played in the Canadian Lacrosse League. The Ironmen, along with the Ohsweken Demons, played out of the Iroquois Lacrosse Arena in Ohsweken, Ontario. On November 8, 2013, team owner Rodney Hill announced that the team would be folding prior to the 2014 season.

== History ==
The Ironmen played their first game ever on January 7, 2012, at home, in Hagersville, Ontario. The Ironmen lost the game to the Brampton Inferno 18–11 in what was CLax's inaugural game.

== Season-by-season record ==
Note: GP = Games played, W = Wins, L = Losses, T = Ties, OTL = Overtime losses, Pts = Points, GF = Goals for, GA = Goals against

Season	GP	W	L	GF	GA	P	Results	Playoffs
2012	14	6	8	179	189	12	4th CLax	Won Semi-final, 17–16 (TurfDogs); Lost Final, 15–10 (Demons)
2013	14	4	10	166	196	8	6th CLax	Won Quarter-final, 15–13 (Demons); Won Semi-final, 16–15 (Lock Monsters); Won Creator's Cup, 14–11 (Shooting Stars)
