= Matthew Bennett (lacrosse) =

Canadian lacrosse player

Personal information
- Nationality: Canadian
- Born: January 25, 1993 (age 33) Brampton, Ontario
- Height: 6 ft 2 in (188 cm)
- Weight: 198 lb (90 kg; 14 st 2 lb)

Sport
- Position: Defense
- Shoots: Left
- NLL draft: 14th overall, 2014; Buffalo Bandits
- NLL team: Buffalo Bandits
- MSL team: Brampton Excelsiors
- Pro career: 2015–

Matthew Bennett (born January 25, 1993) is a professional lacrosse player for the Rochester Knighthawks and previously the Philadelphia Wings and Buffalo Bandits of the National Lacrosse League. As well as the Brampton Excelsiors of Major Series Lacrosse. Hailing from Brampton, Ontario, Bennett began his junior lacrosse career in 2010 with the Junior B Mimico Mountaineers. Starting in 2011, he spent four years with the Junior A Brampton Excelsiors. He also played for the Oshawa Machine and the Brampton Inferno of the Canadian Lacrosse League.

Following his junior career, Bennett was drafted in the second round (14th overall) in the 2014 NLL Entry Draft by the Buffalo Bandits, and then second overall in the 2015 MSL draft by the senior Excelsiors. After playing for most of the 2016 and 2017 NLL seasons, Bennett was sidelined in January, 2018 with an ACL tear, causing him to miss most of the 2018 NLL season and all of the 2018 MSL season.
