= Colin Boucher =

Canadian lacrosse player

Personal information
- Born: March 9, 1988 (age 38)
- Height: 6 ft 5 in (196 cm)
- Weight: 240 lb (110 kg; 17 st 2 lb)

Sport
- Position: Defense
- Shoots: Right
- NLL team: Vancouver Stealth
- MSL team Former teams: Six Nations Chiefs; Brampton Excelsiors
- Pro career: 2015–

Colin Boucher (born March 9, 1988) is a Canadian professional lacrosse player for the Vancouver Stealth of the National Lacrosse League and the Six Nations Chiefs of Major Series Lacrosse. Hailing from Huntsville, Ontario, Boucher began his amateur career in 2004 with the Jr. A Orillia Rama Kings. Tiring of travelling to play, Boucher helped found a Sr. B arm of the Huntsville Hawks. When the Hawks folded in 2013, he signed with the Sr. B St. Catharines Saints, with whom he won a Presidents Cup. He began his MSL career in 2012 with the Brampton Excelsiors, and would move on to the Six Nations Chiefs in 2013, winning back-to-back Mann Cups in 2013 and 2014. Boucher has also played for the Durham TurfDogs and the Barrie Blizzard of the winter Canadian Lacrosse League.

Undrafted in the NLL, Boucher spent the 2014 NLL season on the Buffalo Bandits' practice squad, but did not dress for a game. He spent the 2014 training camp with the Colorado Mammoth, but was released prior to the season. He signed with the Vancouver Stealth on January 16, 2015, and saw his first game action against the Bandits the next day.
