= CLL =

CLL is an abbreviation that can stand for:

- Chronic lymphocytic leukemia
- Canadian Lacrosse League, governing organization for major junior lacrosse in Canada.
- Collington railway station, a railway station in Sussex, England
- Community language learning
- Easterwood Airport, Texas, USA, IATA code
