= Ryan Campbell (lacrosse) =

Canadian professional lacrosse player

- Born: Brampton, Ontario
- Nationality: Canadian
- NLL draft: 10th overall, 2008; Edmonton Rush
- NLL teams: Edmonton Rush
- CLL team: SouthWest Cyclops
- Pro career: 2009–

Ryan Campbell is a Canadian professional lacrosse player. He was the captain for the SouthWest Cyclops of the Canadian Lacrosse League (CLL).

Campbell played three games with the Edmonton Rush of the National Lacrosse League (NLL) during the 2009 season.

== Awards and honours ==
Award	Year
CLL First All-star team	2012
