= Clay Hill (lacrosse) =

Canadian lacrosse player

Personal information
- Nationality: Canada
- Born: May 17, 1976 (age 50) Hamilton, Ontario
- Height: 5 ft 11 in (180 cm)
- Weight: 185 lb (84 kg; 13 st 3 lb)

Sport
- Position: Defense
- Shoots: Left
- NLL draft: 31st overall, 1997; Buffalo Bandits
- NLL team: Buffalo Bandits
- Career team: Six Nations Chiefs (MSL); Ohsweken Demons (CLax); Six Nations Rivermen (OSBLL); Mohawk Stars (OSBLL)
- Pro career: 1997–

Career highlights
- NLL Championship: 2008; CLax Championship: 2012

Clay Hill (born Clay Squire on May 17, 1976, in Hamilton, Ontario) is a Canadian professional box lacrosse player. He was a member of the National Lacrosse League's Buffalo Bandits for seven seasons, where he won a NLL Championship in 2008. He also played from 1997 until 2012 as a member of the Mann Cup-eligible Six Nations Chiefs. Now, late in his career, he plays in the semi-professional Canadian Lacrosse League during the winter and the OLA Senior B Lacrosse League in the summer.

== Career ==
Hill joined the Six Nations Chiefs of Major Series Lacrosse in 2002. He was originally selected by the Bandits of the Major Indoor Lacrosse League in the 4th Round of the 1997 MILL Entry Draft but did not sign with the team until December 7, 2004. He played his first NLL game in 2005.

In 2008, Hill played all 16 regular season games and all 3 playoff games as he, with the Buffalo Bandits, won the NLL Championship.

In 2011, Hill left the National Lacrosse League. He played his final season as a member of the Six Nations Chiefs of Major Series Lacrosse in 2012, competing for the Mann Cup Senior A championship of Canada. He and the Chiefs made it to the league finals before falling to the Peterborough Lakers. Completing his seventh season with the bandits, Hill has accumulated 61 points over the course of 99 games and played in a cumulative total of 10 playoff games for the Buffalo Bandits prior to retiring from the team.

In 2012, Hill joined the Ohsweken Demons of the Canadian Lacrosse League. He and the Demons would go on to win the inaugural CLax Championship. For his play, the league named him to the league's second all-star team.

== Family ==
Clay Hill was raised in the Six Nations (a First Nations Reserve), in one of the Iroquois Nations. The main reserve where Clay Hill is born is found between the cities of Brantford, Caledonia, and Hagersville. The land includes around 18,000 hectares of land. In the summer, Hill travels through the Toronto area to look for job opportunities, particularly steel construction, to support his family when he is in offseason.

== Statistics ==
=== NLL ===
Statistics provided by: http://www.nll.com/.

		Regular Season						Playoffs
Season	Team	GP	G	A	Pts	LB	PIM	GP	G	A	Pts	LB	PIM
2005	Buffalo	16	1	5	6	62	12	1	0	0	0	5	0
2006	Buffalo	11	2	3	5	52	4	0	0	0	0	0	0
2007	Buffalo	16	1	7	8	60	4	2	1	3	4	14	0
2008	Buffalo	16	7	5	1	85	4	3	0	1	1	9	2
2009	Buffalo	14	2	13	15	73	10	2	0	1	1	8	0
2010	Buffalo	10	0	8	8	48	4	1	0	0	0	2	0
2011	Buffalo	16	1	6	7	43	21	2	1	1	2	4	0
NLL totals		99	14	47	61	423	59	11	2	6	8	42	2

=== CLA/CLax ===
Statistics provided by: https://web.archive.org/web/20140224031603/http://wampsbibleoflacrosse.com/

			Regular Season					Playoffs
Season	Team	League	GP	G	A	Pts	PIM	GP	G	A	Pts	PIM
1993	Six Nations	OJALL	14	6	12	18	38	12	2	8	10	12
1994	Six Nations	OJALL	23	12	21	33	51	5	4	1	5	4
1995	Six Nations	OJALL	14	9	13	22	50	-	-	-	-	-
1996	Did Not Participate
1997	Six Nations	OJALL	16	18	39	57	51	15	5	36	41	44
-	Six Nations	MSL	3	1	0	1	0	-	-	-	-	-
1998	Six Nations	MSL	17	9	24	33	54	-	-	-	-	-
1999	Six Nations	MSL	16	2	17	19	54	3	1	0	1	4
2000	Six Nations	MSL	10	8	9	17	8	-	-	-	-	-
2001	Six Nations	MSL	12	6	4	10	11	-	-	-	-	-
2002	Six Nations	MSL	1	3	0	3	2	-	-	-	-	-
-	Six Nations	OSBLL	13	13	23	36	26	6	11	11	22	4
2003	Six Nations	MSL	10	8	4	12	10	3	2	2	4	0
2004	Six Nations	MSL	15	6	16	22	18	7	6	4	10	10
2005	Six Nations	MSL	15	3	11	14	14	7	6	3	9	2
2006	Six Nations	MSL	4	0	2	2	4	-	-	-	-	-
-	Mohawk Stars	OSBLL	1	0	1	1	0	2	3	3	6	0
2007	Six Nations	MSL	3	2	7	9	0	-	-	-	-	-
-	Mohawk Stars	OSBLL	7	4	7	11	8	6	2	2	4	4
2008	Six Nations	MSL	10	5	2	7	4	4	3	2	5	8
2009	Six Nations	MSL	13	5	4	9	17	4	1	1	2	2
2010	Six Nations	MSL	16	8	9	17	24	11	4	3	7	35
2011	Six Nations	MSL	18	5	5	10	24	11	1	2	3	23
2012	Ohsweken	CLax	14	10	20	30	34	2	1	5	6	0
-	Six Nations	MSL	13	1	9	10	13	10	0	4	4	12
2013	Ohsweken	CLax	5	2	4	6	2	1	1	1	2	0
-	Six Nations	OSBLL	12	1	12	13	12	6	2	2	4	0
MSL Totals			176	72	123	195	257	60	24	21	45	96
OSBLL Totals			33	18	43	61	46	20	18	18	36	8
OJALL Totals			67	45	85	130	190	32	11	45	56	60
CLax Totals			19	12	24	36	36	3	2	6	8	0
