= US Indoor Lacrosse =

- Sport: Box lacrosse
- Founded: 2006
- Country: United States
- Headquarters: Charlotte, NC
- Website: usindoorlacrosse.org

US Indoor Lacrosse (USIL) is an American junior box lacrosse organization that manages national player development and international competition. Founded in 2006, USIL creates opportunities for players, teams, coaches, and referees to participate and advance in the sport through international and national events, and educational programs. USIL selects and trains teams that compete in all International Indoor Junior Lacrosse (IIJL) events, including the World Junior Lacrosse Championship.

== History ==
Originally formed in 2006 to manage the United States national indoor lacrosse team, USIL operated under a contract with USA Lacrosse. After the contract ended in 2014, USIL shifted its focus to developing a junior pathway and expanding participation in the sport. The organization now oversees U16, U18, and Junior teams that compete in IIJL Championship events, providing opportunities for young athletes to gain international experience.

The United States, under USIL, won their first IIJL World Junior Lacrosse Championship in 2023, defeating Canada 10-7 in the gold medal game.

USIL hosted the 2023 IIJL World Junior Lacrosse Championship in Erie, Pennsylvania, the first time the tournament was held outside of Canada.

== Overview ==
=== Core Objectives ===
USIL operates under three main objectives:

- Build the Base: Expanding participation in indoor lacrosse by introducing the sport to a broader audience, especially young people.
- Promote the Sport: Increasing visibility for indoor lacrosse through publicity and outreach efforts to encourage more participation.
- Achieve Competitive Success: Supporting athletes in achieving success in international and professional lacrosse, contributing to the sport's growth.

=== Programs and Events ===
USIL runs several programs focused on developing the sport of indoor lacrosse:

- Junior Program (U21, U18, U16): Developing young talent and providing a competitive pathway for athletes to represent the United States at the IIJL World Indoor Lacrosse Championships.
- Coaching and Officiating Education: Providing resources for the development of coaches and officials to enhance the experience for players at all levels.
- National and International Competitions: USIL is responsible for selecting and training U.S. teams for the IIJL World Junior Lacrosse Championship and supporting the athletes' participation in international events.

=== Mission ===
The mission of US Indoor Lacrosse is to expand participation in box lacrosse, promote the sport, and help athletes achieve competitive success. Through these efforts, USIL seeks to support the growth and development of the sport at all levels.
