= Durham TurfDogs =

- Founded: 2011; 14 years ago
- Folded: 2016; 9 years ago
- League: Canadian Lacrosse League
- Based in: Oshawa, Ontario
- Arena: GM Centre
- Colours: Green and White
- Head coach: Mat Giles
- General manager: Jonas Derks
- Website: Official CLax website

Durham TurfDogs were a Canadian professional indoor lacrosse team that played in the Canadian Lacrosse League. The TurfDogs, along with the Oshawa Machine, played out of the GM Centre in Oshawa, Ontario.

== History ==
The TurfDogs played their first game on January 7, 2012 in Hagersville, Ontario, which was a loss to the Peel Avengers 16-9.

== Season-by-season record ==
Note: GP = Games played, W = Wins, L = Losses, T = Ties, OTL = Overtime losses, Pts = Points, GF = Goals for, GA = Goals against

Season	GP	W	L	GF	GA	P	Results	Playoffs
2012	14	9	5	180	176	18	1st CLax	Lost semi-final, 17-16 (Ironmen)
2013	14	7	7	153	148	14	5th CLax	Won quarter-final, 11-9 (Inferno); Lost semi-final, 11-10 (Shooting Stars)
2014	8	1	7	83	106	2	5th CLax	Did not qualify
2015	8	4	4	92	92	8	4th CLax	Lost semi-final, 13-11 (Demons)
2016	10	6	4	133	118	12	2nd CLax	Won semi-final, 13-12 (Blizzard); Won Creator's Cup, 11-9 (Demons)
