= Ohsweken Demons =

- Founded: 2011
- League: Canadian Lacrosse League
- Team history: Ceased in 2016
- Based in: Hagersville, Ontario
- Arena: Iroquois Lacrosse Arena
- Colours: Black, Yellow, Red, and White
- Owner: Rodney Hill
- Head coach: Randy Chrysler
- Manager: Vince Hill
- Championships: 2012
- Website: http://ohswekendemons.ca

Ohsweken Demons were a Canadian professional indoor lacrosse team that played in the Canadian Lacrosse League. The Demons played out of the Iroquois Lacrosse Arena in Hagersville, Ontario.

== History ==
The Ohsweken Demons played their first game ever on January 7, 2012, at home, in Hagersville, Ontario. The Demons defeated the Oshawa Machine 19–13.

Ohsweken finished the 2012 regular season with an 8–6 record, placing them 3rd in the CLax standings. In the first round of playoff action the Demons would face the second-seeded Brampton Inferno, who also finished the season with an 8–6 record. Chris Attwood would score the decisive goal to give Ohsweken the 17–16 victory. In the Creators' Cup championship, the Demons would face the Iroquois Ironmen in an all native match-up. Ohsweken would become the first-ever Creators' Cup Champions winning 15–10.

Many Demons players were commemorated for their efforts on the 2012 All-CLax team as well as by receiving awards in the first-ever season of the Canadian Lacrosse League. Goalie Jeff Powless was named to the All-CLax First Team and CLax Goaltender of the Year. Chris Attwood was selected to the first team, as well as being named the Offensive Player of the Year and league MVP. Clay Hill, a former member of the Buffalo Bandits of the National Lacrosse League, was named to the All-CLax Second Team.

== Season-by-season record ==
Note: GP = Games played, W = Wins, L = Losses, T = Ties, OTL = Overtime losses, Pts = Points, GF = Goals for, GA = Goals against

Season	GP	W	L	GF	GA	League Finish	Playoffs
2012	14	8	6	187	173	3rd CLax	Won semi-final, 17-16 (Inferno); Won Creator's Cup, 15-10 (Ironmen)
2013	14	8	6	191	180	3rd CLax	Lost quarter-final, 15-13 (Ironmen)
2014	8	7	1	127	97	1st CLax	Won semi-final, 12-10 (Cyclops); Lost final, 10-9 OT (Lock Monsters)
2015	8	4	4	90	88	2nd CLax	Won semi-final, 13-11 (TurfDogs); Lost final, 13-12 (Blizzard)
2016	10	4	6	115	147	4th CLax	Won semi-final, 13-9 (Lock Monsters); Lost final, 11-9 (TurfDogs)
