= Sadlon Arena =

Indoor arena in Barrie, Ontario

- "BMC"
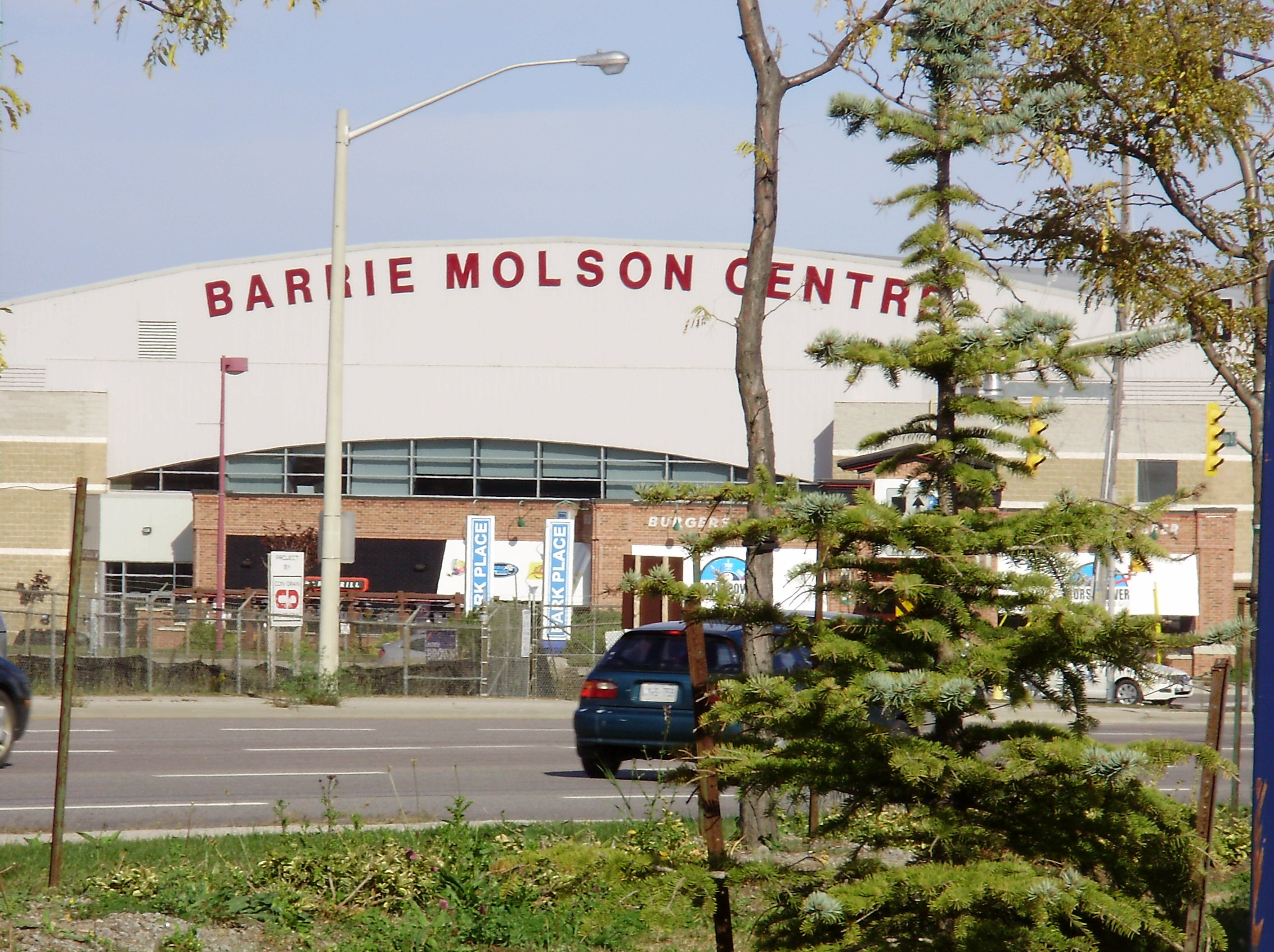
- Sadlon Arena seen in 2008 with its former name

- Location within Ontario Location within Canada
- Address: 555 Bayview Drive; Barrie, Ontario; L4N 8Y2
- Coordinates: 44°20′16″N 79°40′41″W
- Owner: City of Barrie
- Operator: City of Barrie
- Capacity: Hockey: 4,195; East End Stage: 4,801; Centre Stage: 5,000; Wrestling: 5,400; Standing Room: 100 people (North East Corner and the South East Corners of the arena bowl); Luxury suites: 27 - 14 at ice level and 13 at the top of the seating area on the Southside of the arena

Construction
- Groundbreaking: November 1994
- Opened: December 31, 1995
- Cost: CA$13 million ($24.4 million in 2025 dollars)
- Architect: Brisbin Brook Beynon Architects
- Services engineer: The Mitchell Partnership Inc.
- General contractor: PCL Constructors Eastern Inc.

Tenants
- Barrie Colts (OHL) (1995–present); Barrie Lakeshores (MSL) (2004–2007); Barrie Blizzard (CLax) (2013–2016); Monsignor Clair Cup (1999-present)

Sadlon Arena (formerly known as the Barrie Molson Centre) is a 4,195-seat multi-purpose arena in Barrie, Ontario, Canada. It is primarily home to the Barrie Colts of the Ontario Hockey League. It is located in the south end of the city on Bayview Drive at Mapleview Drive, near Park Place.

The arena hosted its first OHL game on December 31, 1995, when the Barrie Colts hosted the Sudbury Wolves. The Colts played the first half of their inaugural season at the old Dunlop Arena while the BMC was under construction. It is the former home of the Barrie Lakeshores of Major Series Lacrosse. The Molson Centre hosted the 2013 The Dominion Tankard, the provincial curling championship.

The naming agreement for the Barrie Molson Centre ended on December 31, 2018. As a result, the City of Barrie placed an interim sign on the arena with the initials BMC until a new sponsor was found. On November 26, 2019, the city announced that a new, 10-year naming rights agreement with Paul Sadlon Motors (a local auto dealership) had been approved that will change the name of the facility to "Sadlon Arena".

== See also ==
- Barrie Colts
- Ontario Hockey League

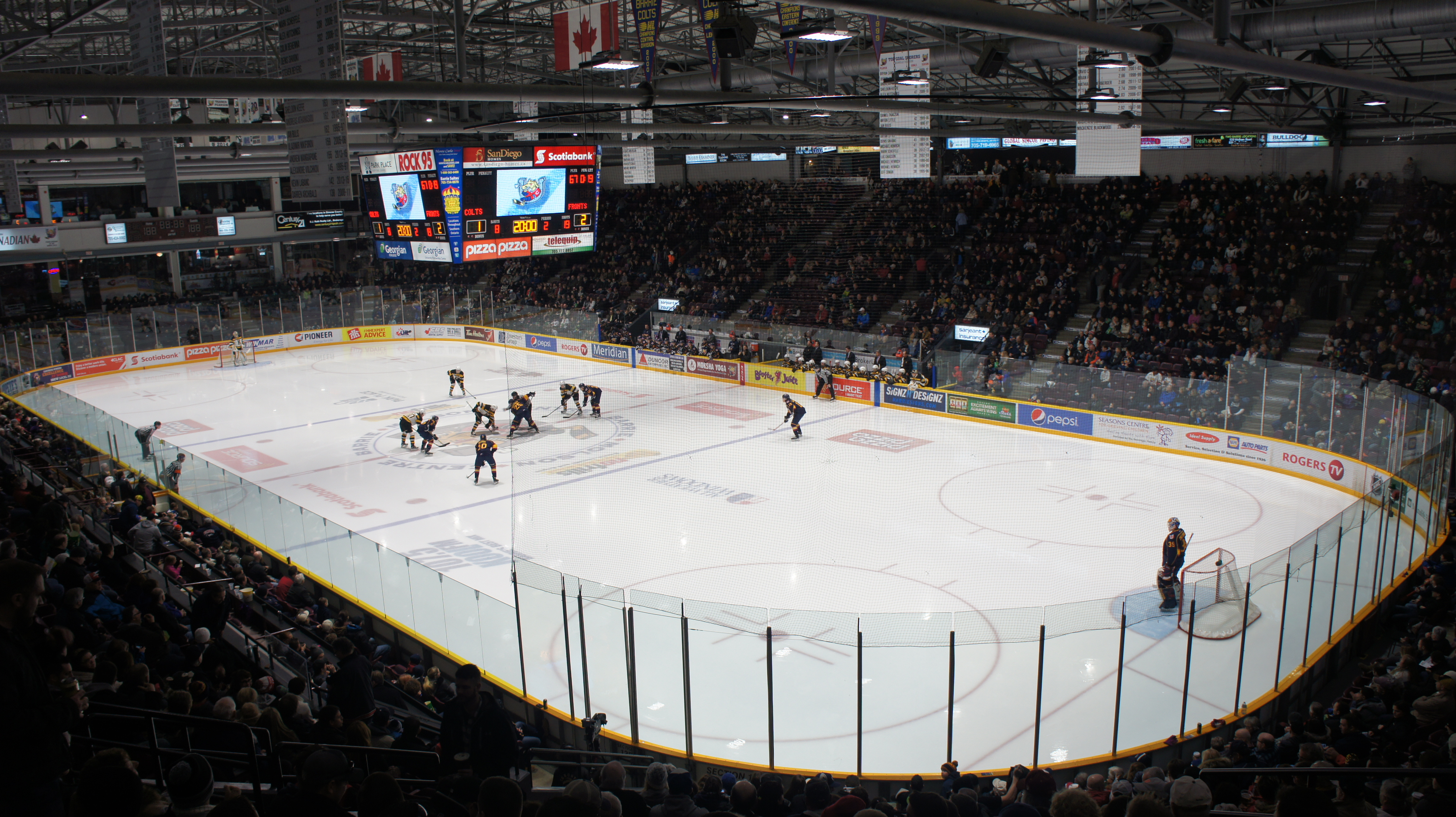
Interior
