= Davide DiRuscio =

Canadian lacrosse player

Personal information
- Born: May 5, 1992 (age 34) Oakville, Ontario, Canada
- Height: 6 ft 3 in (191 cm)
- Weight: 300 lb (140 kg; 21 st 6 lb)

Sport
- Position: Goaltender
- NLL teams: Buffalo Bandits, Philadelphia Wings
- MSL team: Cobourg Kodiaks
- Pro career: 2015–2019

Davide DiRuscio (born May 5, 1992) is a Canadian former professional box lacrosse goaltender for the Buffalo Bandits and the Philadelphia Wings of the National Lacrosse League. Undrafted, DiRuscio signed with the Bandits for the 2015 NLL season. Outside of the NLL, DiRuscio has played for the St. Catharines Saints, Coquitlam Adanacs, Peterborough Lakers, and the Niagara Lock Monsters. With the Lock Monsters in 2014, DiRuscio was named MVP and Top Goaltender of the Canadian Lacrosse League DiRuscio made his NLL debut with the Bandits in relief of Anthony Cosmo on January 31, 2015, and won his first career start on February 28 against the Colorado Mammoth.
