= Tribute Communities Centre =

Multi-purpose arena located in Oshawa

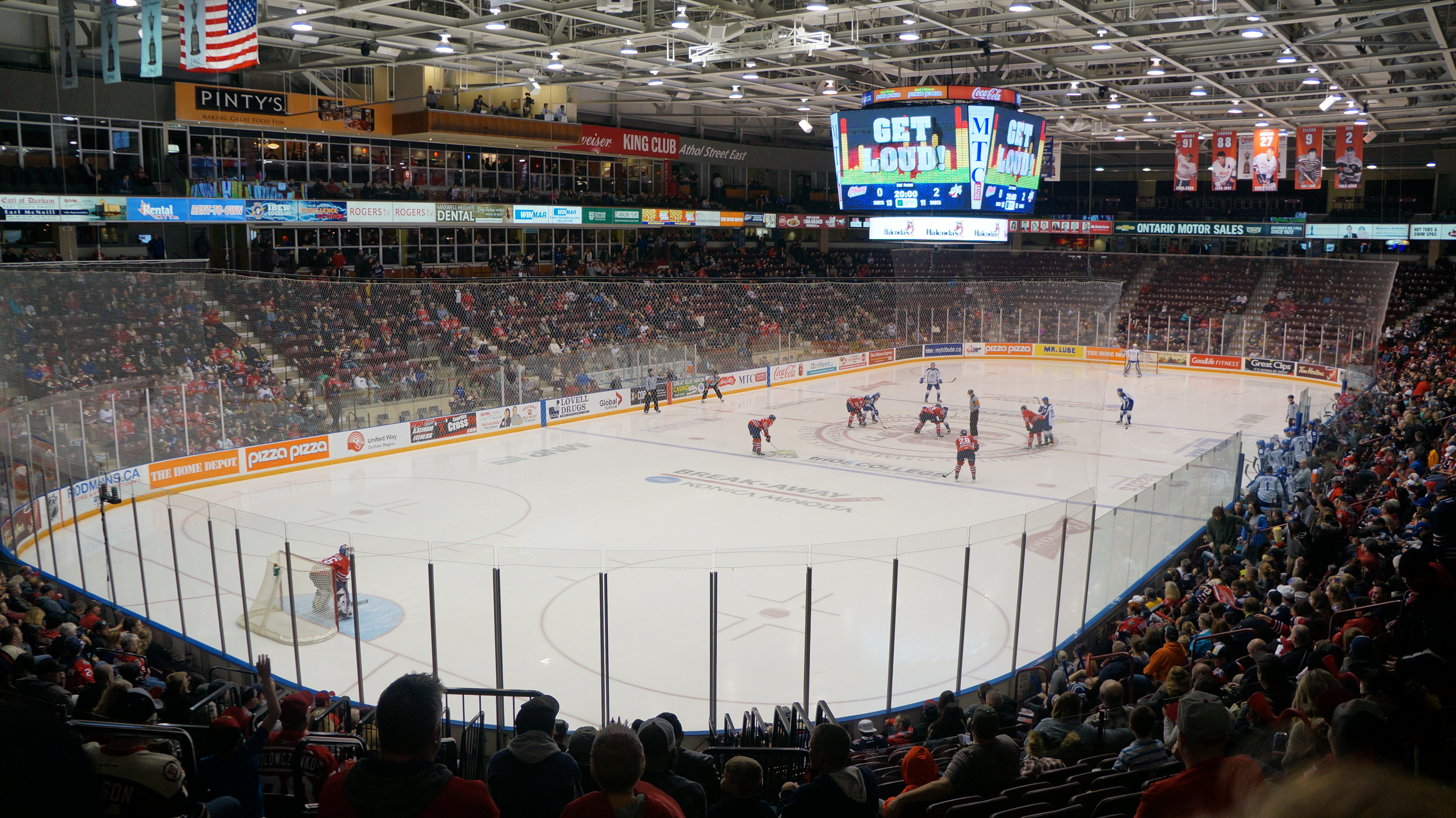
- Tribute Communities Centre

- Location within Ontario Location within Canada
- Former names: General Motors Centre (2006–2016)
- Address: 99 Athol Street East
- Location: Oshawa, Ontario, Canada
- Coordinates: 43°53′50″N 78°51′35″W
- Owner: City of Oshawa
- Operator: Spectra Venue Management
- Capacity: Hockey: 5,180, 6,125 with standing room; Concerts: 3,200 - 7,300; Club Seats: 530; Standing Room:258; Private Suites: 23; Employees: 700

Construction
- Groundbreaking: June 22, 2005
- Opened: November 3, 2006
- Cost: C$45 million ($67.7 million in 2025 dollars)
- Architect: NORR Limited
- Project manager: WeirFoulds
- Structural engineers: IBI Group, Inc.
- General contractor: Giffels Design-Build Inc.

Tenants
- Oshawa Generals (OHL) (2006–present); Oshawa FireWolves (NLL) (2025–present); Durham TurfDogs (CLax) (2012–2016); Oshawa Power (NBL Canada) (2011–2013); Oshawa Machine (CLax) (2012)

Website
- www.tributecommunitiescentre.com

The Tribute Communities Centre, formerly known as the General Motors Centre or GM Centre, GMC for short, is a multi-purpose arena located in downtown Oshawa, Ontario, Canada, which opened in November 2006. The arena was constructed to replace the Oshawa Civic Auditorium. The main tenants are the Oshawa Generals of the Ontario Hockey League and, since 2025, the Oshawa FireWolves of the National Lacrosse League. It features the Oshawa Sports Hall of Fame, Prospects Bar and Grill, an Oshawa Generals retail store, executive seating and special club seats. The name was changed to Tribute Communities Centre on November 1, 2016.

== History ==
The Tribute Communities Centre is owned by the city of Oshawa. On October 5, 2006, General Motors obtained the naming rights of the arena. The City originally selected Maple Leaf Sports & Entertainment (MLSE) to manage the building but, after disappointing results in the first year and a half, MLSE requested in March 2008 that its contract be terminated. MLSE had been attempting to get into the business of managing facilities beyond those where their sports teams played but decided to withdraw, with Bob Hunter, MLSE's Vice President of venues and entertainment, saying that managing the arena was "no longer a strategic focus for us". Global Spectrum assumed control of the operations and management of the arena on June 30, 2008.

On April 14, 2016, they announced an agreement to replace the videoboard in the building. It meets Canadian Hockey League requirements for a future Memorial Cup bid, and replaces the old videoboard, which was a point of contention for Generals fans over the past few years.

An announcement was made on October 7, 2016 that the facility would be renamed the Tribute Communities Centre effective November 1, 2016. Originally set to expire in 2026, Tribute Communities' naming rights were later extended until 2031.

== 2015 Pan American Games ==
For the 2015 Pan American Games the facility hosted both weightlifting and boxing events. During the games, the facility was configured to hold roughly 3,000 spectators per session. During Games time the facility was known as the Oshawa Sports Centre.

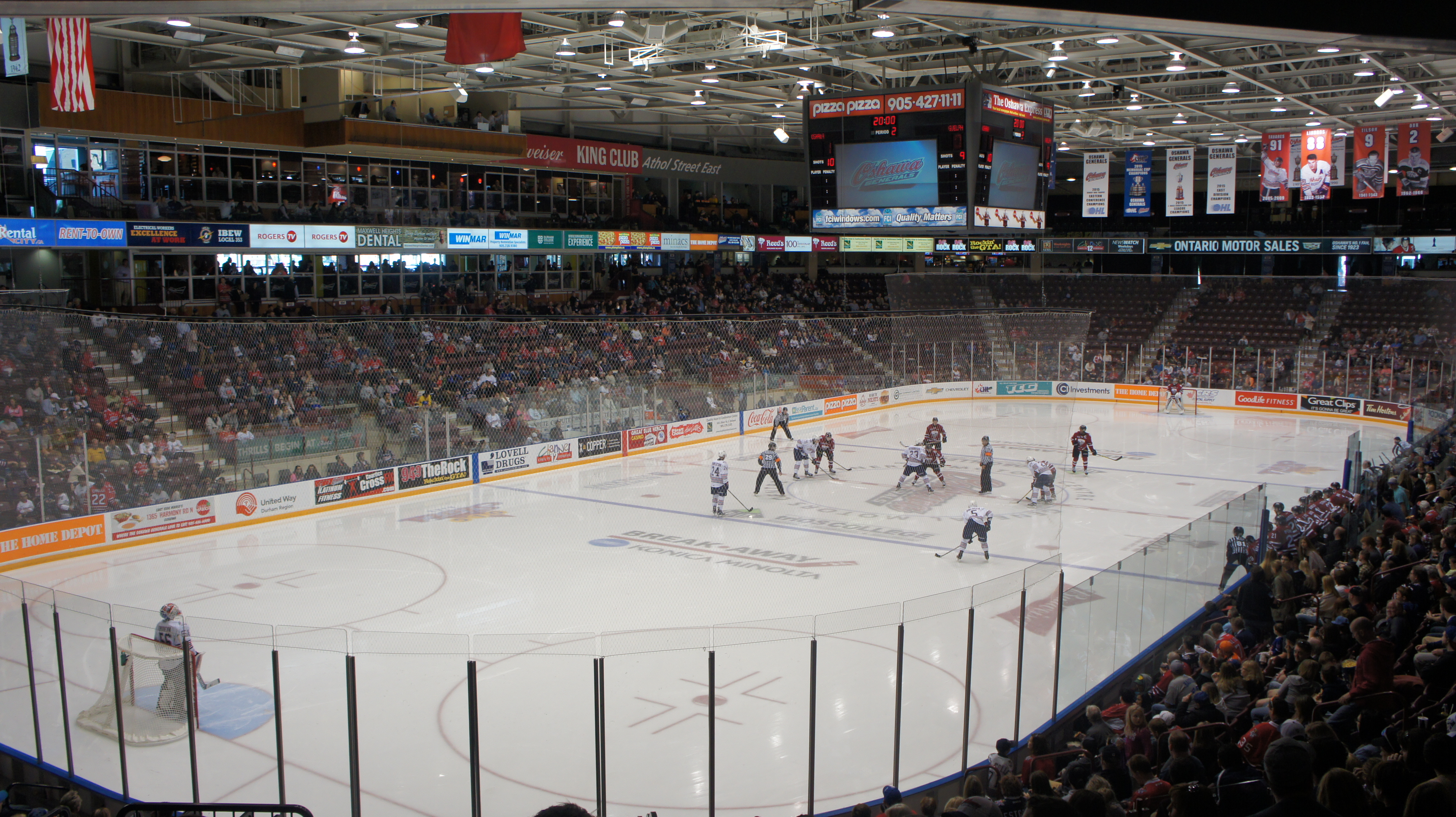
Interior view during an Oshawa Generals game

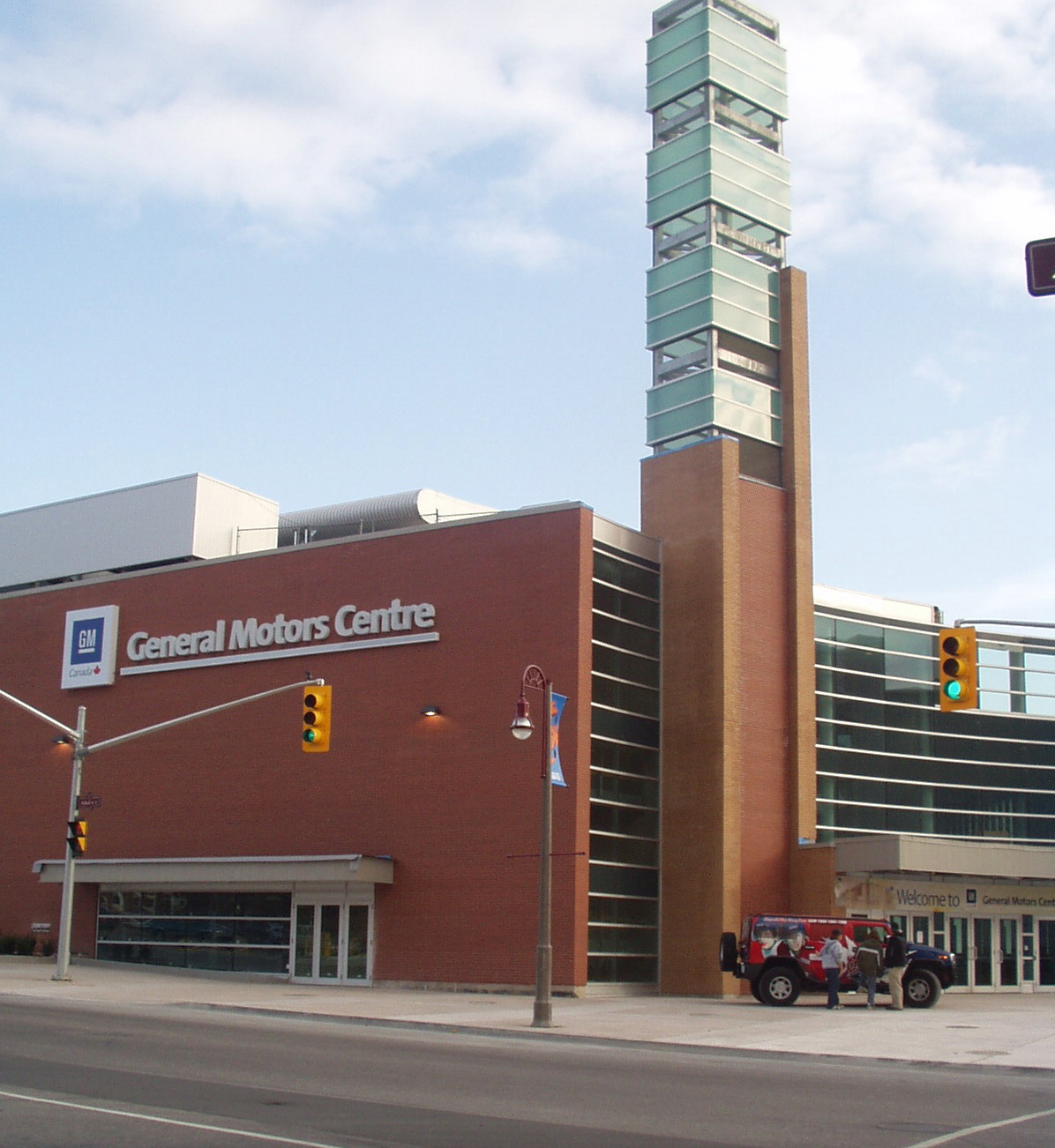
Tribute Communities Centre Exterior, when known as the General Motors Centre

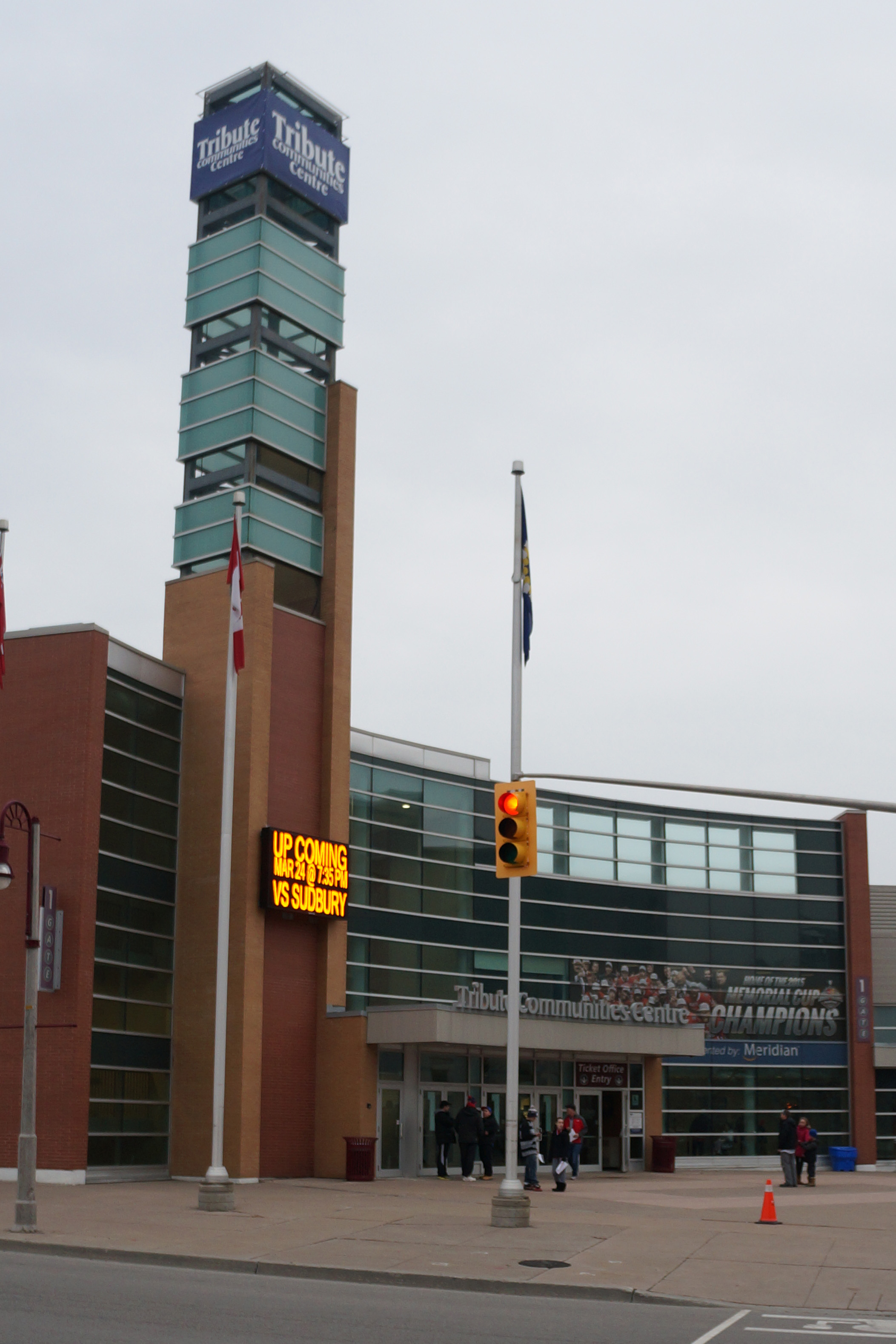
Exterior with Tribute Communities Branding
