= Meridian Centre =

Arena in St. Catharines, Ontario

Coordinates: 43°09′20.94″N 79°14′39.20″W

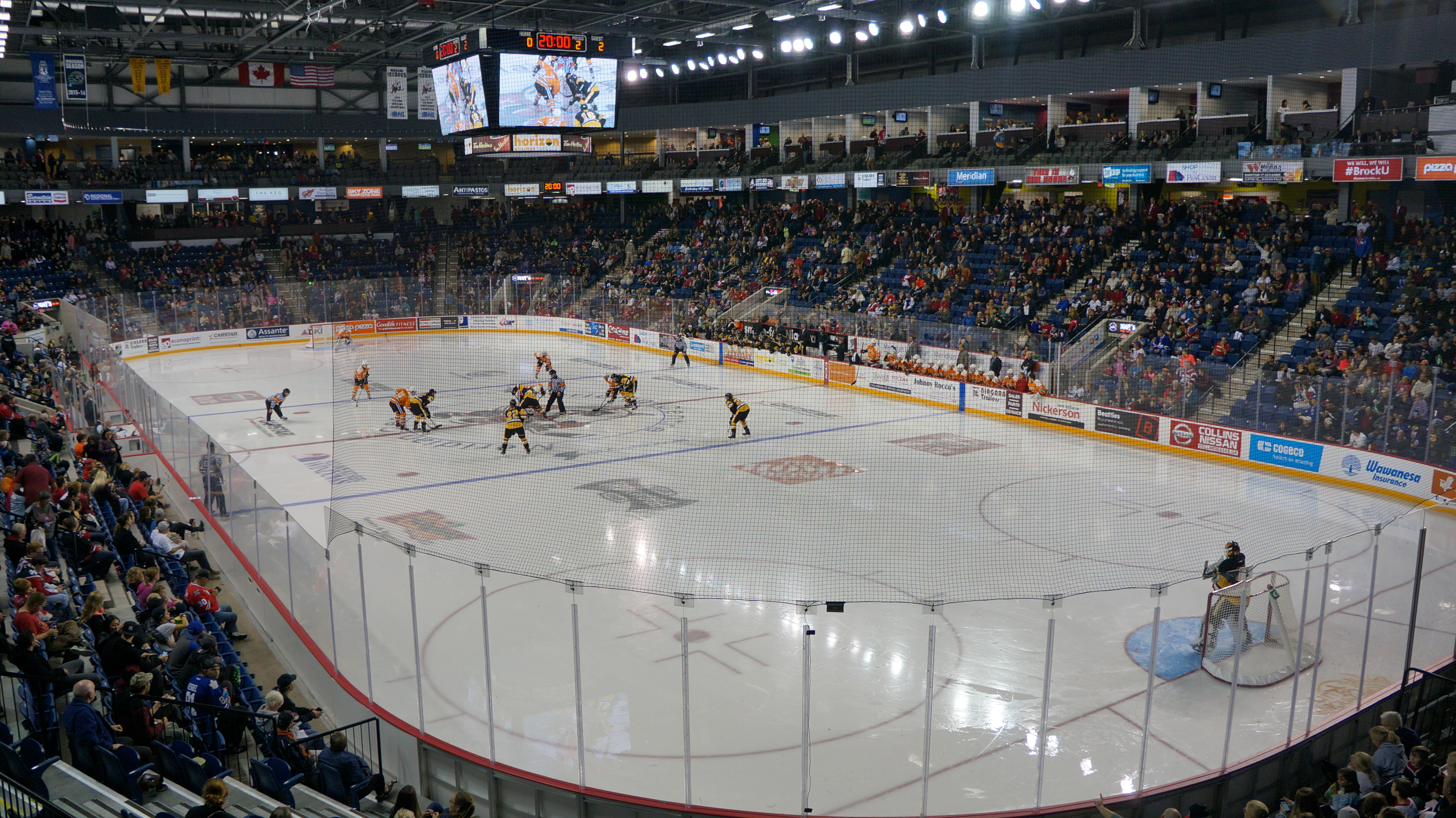

- Location within Ontario Location within Canada
- Location: 1 David S. Howes Way; St. Catharines, Ontario; L2R 0B3
- Owner: City of St. Catharines
- Operator: SMG Canada ULC
- Capacity: 5,300 - Hockey; 5,580 - Standing Room; 6,000 - Concerts; 4,030 - Basketball
- Field size: 200' X 85'

Construction
- Opened: October 11, 2014
- Cost: $50 million ($65.6 million in 2025 dollars)
- Architect: PBK Architects
- General contractor: Ball-Rankin

Tenants
- Niagara IceDogs (OHL) (2014–present); Niagara River Lions (CEBL) (2015–present); Niagara Lock Monsters (CLax) (2015–2016)

The Meridian Centre is a 5,300 seat arena in downtown St. Catharines, Ontario, Canada, located at 1 David S. Howes Way. The arena is the home of the Niagara IceDogs of the Ontario Hockey League and the Niagara River Lions of the Canadian Elite Basketball League.

== History ==
In December 2011, after years of debate, St. Catharines City Council voted 9–3 to approve the construction of a multi-use spectator facility with 4,500 to 5,300 seats, at a maximum cost of $50 million. The project was to be funded with $17 million from the civic project fund, $5 million in fundraising, $1 million from the federal gas tax fund.

In October 2012, city councillors voted 11–2 to pay $45 million to Ball-Rankin Construction to build a new 4,500-seat facility, to be completed by September 2014. Ball-Rankin donated a pair of 25-metre elevated walkways to connect the centre to the city's downtown area on St. Paul Street, at a cost of $2 million.

=== Naming rights ===
Meridian Credit Union was given the naming rights of the facility in recognition of its $5.23 million contribution to the project. The name of the arena was announced in September 2013.

=== St. Catharines Sports Hall of Fame ===
The St. Catharines Sports Hall of Fame was founded in 1990 to recognize the outstanding accomplishments of both women and men, athletes and builders whom have significantly contributed to the development of sport in St. Catharines and went on to success at Provincial, National and/or International levels of competition. Upon completion of the Meridian Centre, the St. Catharines Sports Hall of Fame was relocated to concourse level of the arena.

=== Arena information ===
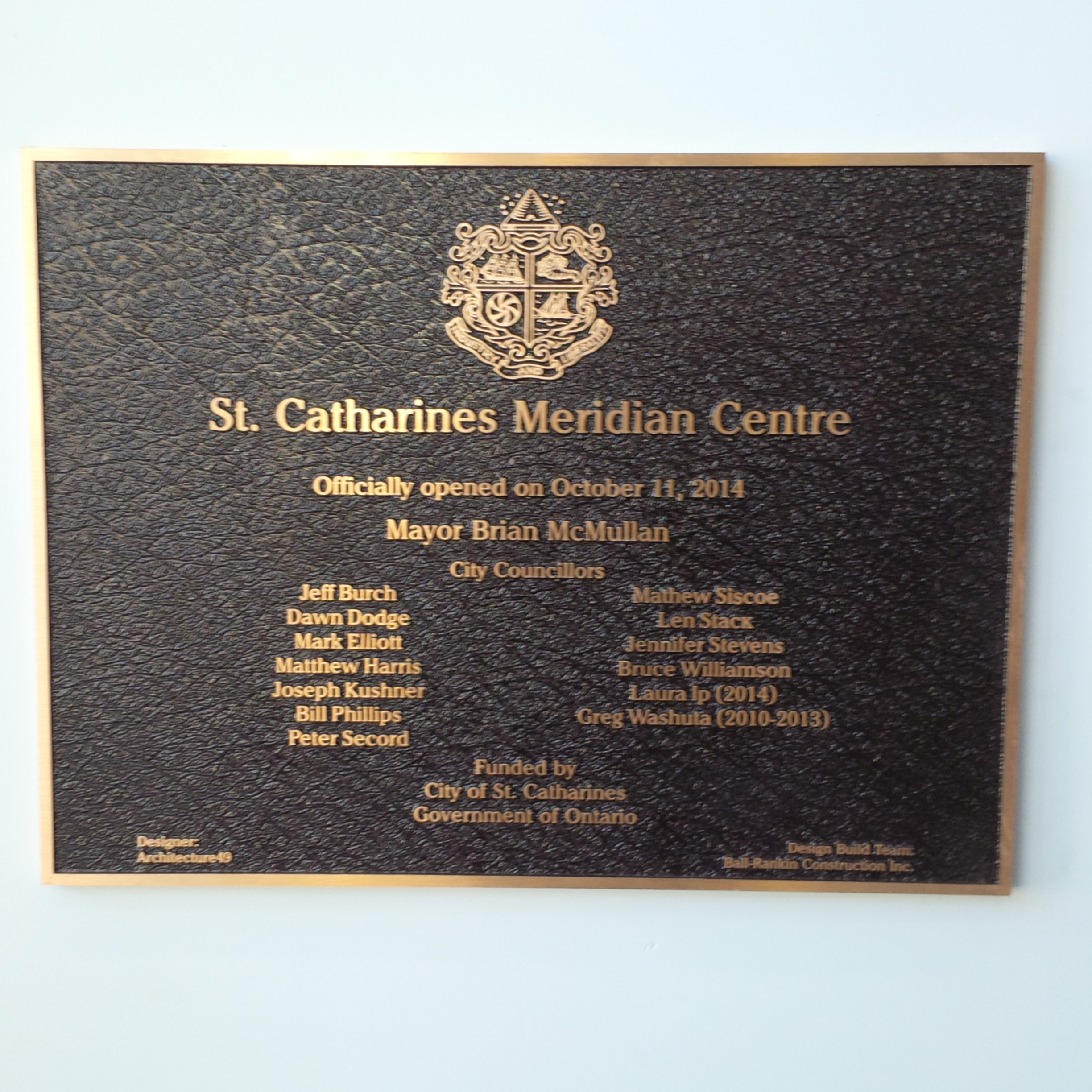
Plaque officially commemorating the opening of the Meridian Centre

The arena offers four main concession stands as well as multiple food carts and seat vendors. The IceDogs also run a retail store inside the Meridian Centre. The arena offers basic concession fare but also has other menu items not typically found including jalapeño sausages, macaroni and cheese and fresh salads. Beer including craft beers and local wines can be found throughout the concourse. The arena also has the IceDogs store which is the main retail store for the IceDogs and sells all fan gear.

== Sports ==
The primary tenant at the Meridian Centre is the Niagara IceDogs of the Ontario Hockey League. The Niagara IceDogs won their first game at the Meridian Centre on October 16, 2014, against the Belleville Bulls by a score of 7–4 in front of a sellout crowd of 5,300, the largest attendance in franchise history. This record was later broken when standing room tickets were sold during the 2015–16 playoffs with an attendance of 5,580.

From 2014-2016, the Meridian Centre hosted the Niagara Lock Monsters of the short lived Canadian Lacrosse League. They won a championship in their inaugural season.

In 2015, the Meridian Centre welcomed a secondary tenant in the Niagara River Lions of the National Basketball League of Canada. The addition of the River Lions basketball court also allows for important Brock University men's and women's basketball games to be relocated to the larger venue of the Meridian Centre. The River Lions joined the Canadian Elite Basketball League in 2018.

The Meridian Centre hosted the 2016 IIHF World Women's U18 Championship in January 2016. The final, a 3–2 overtime victory for the United States over Canada, resulted in the largest hockey crowd in arena history at 5,516. Overall, the total tournament attendance of 34,523 surpassed the previous record of 16,855.

On September 29, 2016, the Meridian Centre hosted a pre-season exhibition game between the Toronto Maple Leafs and the Buffalo Sabres of the National Hockey League. After regulation and overtime, the game remained scoreless. Matt Moulson would ultimately give the Sabres the 1-0 shoot-out win.

The Meridian Centre hosted the 2017 Scotties Tournament of Hearts, the annual Canadian women's curling championship, between February 16 and 26, 2017. Team Ontario, led by Rachel Homan, defeated Team Manitoba in the final by a score of 8–6. The overall attendance throughout the tournament was 56, 804.

In June 2018, the Meridian Centre hosted the 2018 FIBA Under-18 Americas Championship.

In 2020, St Catharines and the Meridian Centre hosted the 2020 CEBL Bubble. The tournament took place at the venue with teams quarantining at city hotels. The Edmonton Stingers were named the champions at the end of the tournament.

The arena hosted the 2025 Minto Cup box lacrosse championships.

== Concerts and other events ==
The arena is used for Brock University's annual Steel Blade Classic and Paint the Meridian Red nights.

On October 21, 2014, St. Catharines' native band City and Colour performed as the headline act for the centre's grand opening. The arena has also hosted such acts as John Mellencamp, The Tragically Hip, Chris De Burgh, Blue Rodeo, Tim Hicks, Old Dominion, Elton John, Daniel O' Donnell, Metric, Johnny Reid, The Glorious Sons, Hedley, Sum 41, NLE Choppa, Ice Cube, Arkells, Death Cab For Cutie, Barenaked Ladies, The Offspring, Simple Plan, Swae Lee, Randy Bachman, The Doobie Brothers, Burton Cummings & Jann Arden, Our Lady Peace, Collective Soul, WinterSleep.

They have also played host to Harlem Globetrotters basketball games, WWE NXT and Cirque du Soleil. Comedians such as Jeff Dunham, Gerry Dee, Jim Jefferies, Jimmy Carr and Jerry Seinfeld have also performed shows at the venue. Other guests who have made appearances include Theresa Caputo. The centre has also held numerous cheerleading competitions, expos and skating shows.

The opening ceremony of the 2022 Canada Summer Games was held at the Meridian Centre on August 6, 2022.

In July 2024, the arena hosted Jelly Roll in his first performances in Canada, with the Meridian Centre being the first ever Canadian tour stop.

== Gallery ==
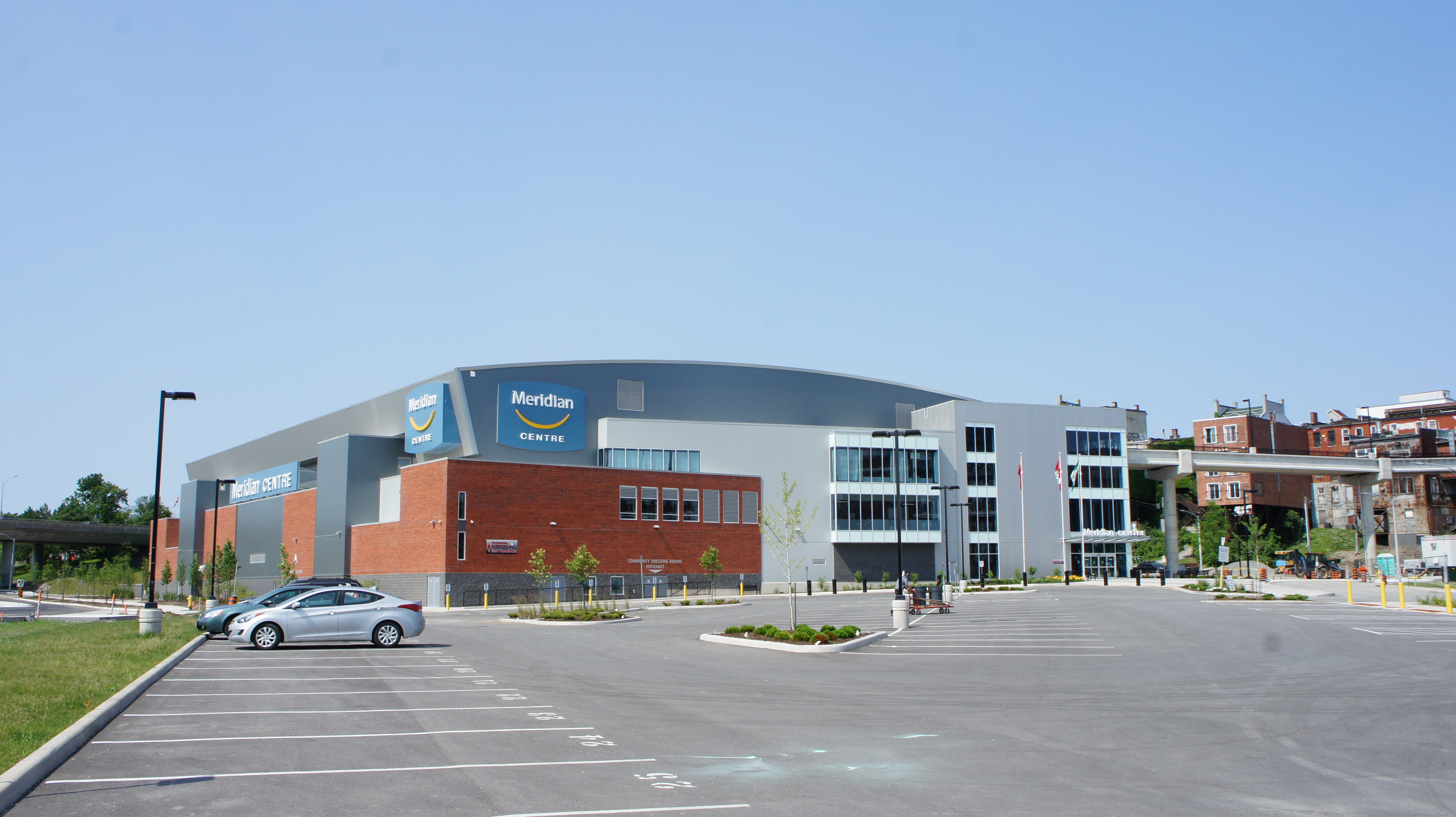
Meridian Centre during the day

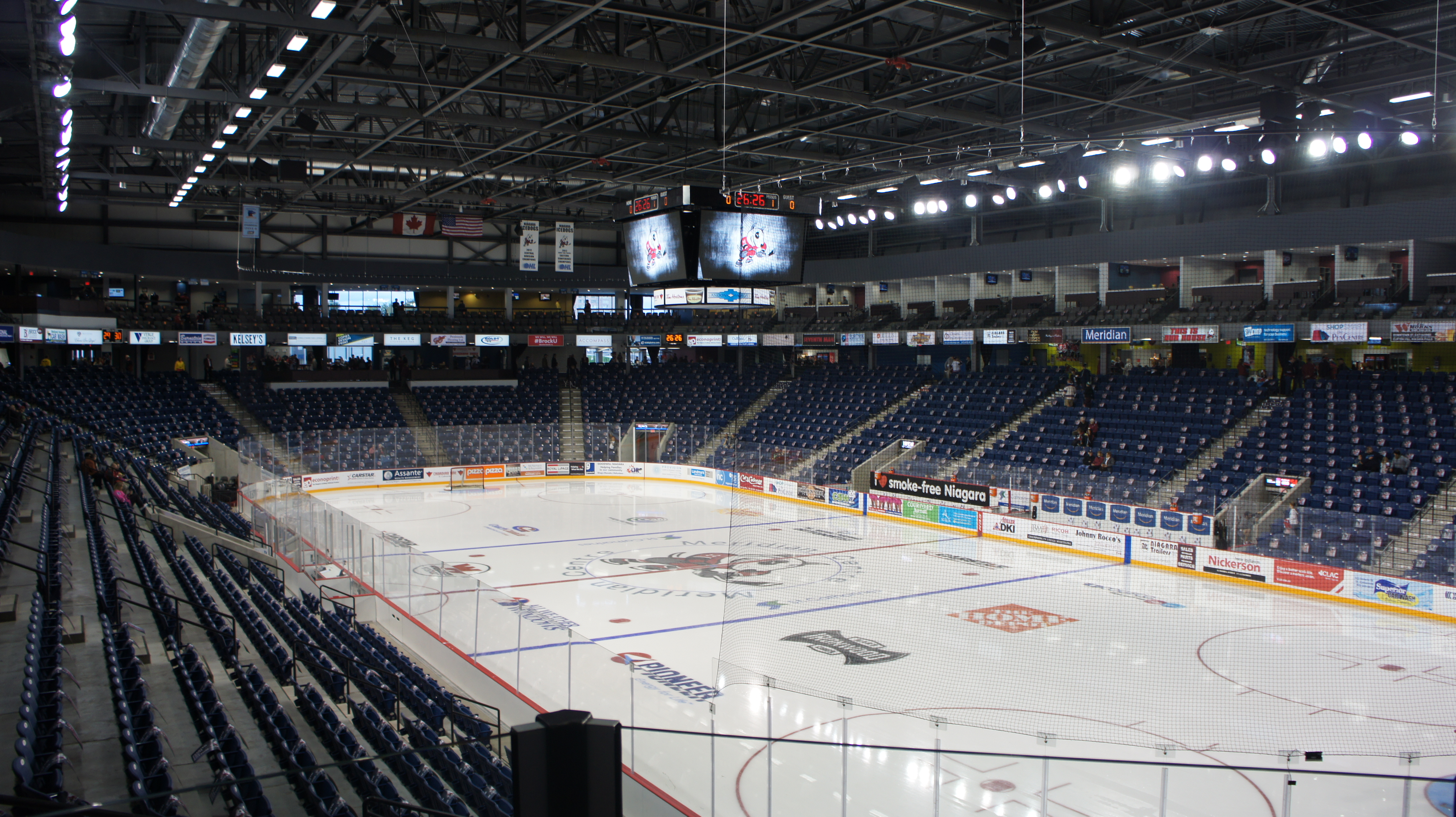
Empty interior

== See also ==
- Scotiabank Convention Centre – convention centre located in Niagara Falls
