= Canadian Lacrosse League (2011) =

Defunct men's indoor lacrosse league

- Sport: Indoor lacrosse
- Founded: 2011
- First season: 2012
- Folded: 2016
- Commissioner: Jim Veltman
- No. of teams: 5
- Country: Canada
- Last champion: Durham TurfDogs (2016)

Founded by Paul St. John in 2011, the Canadian Lacrosse League (CLax) was a men's semi-professional indoor lacrosse league based exclusively in Ontario, Canada. CLax ceased operation on August 31, 2016 after the league's single-entity ownership group, Charlesway Corporation Limited and Rodney 'Demon' Hill, deemed the league's business model to be no longer viable.

Similar to the National Lacrosse League, and unlike other Canadian box lacrosse leagues that play in the summer, CLax played its regular season games in the winter with its playoff games and championship culminating in the early spring. CLax opened its inaugural season with six teams in three cities: Brampton Inferno and Peel Avengers in Brampton, Ontario; the Iroquois Ironmen and Ohsweken Demons in Hagersville, Ontario; and the Durham TurfDogs and Oshawa Machine in Oshawa, Ontario.

== History ==
The league's original intentions were to feature eastern and western leagues. This plan was modified to have multiple Ontario teams and one Quebec location in the first year.

The first three teams announced were franchises in Ohsweken, Peterborough, and Montreal. A Brampton Guardian article listed a team in London. Of the original three, only Oshweken wound up with an actual team in the 2012 season. With only three teams, the league decided two teams should operate in each announced location, leading to the creation of the Iroquois Ironmen, Peel Avengers, and Durham TurfDogs. Rodney Hill operated the two Oshweken teams, but the league owned the other clubs initially.

The inaugural games took place January 7, 2012 starting in Ohsweken. The first game was an 18–11 win for the Brampton Inferno over the hometown Iroquois Ironmen. In the second game, the Peel Avengers defeated the Durham TurfDogs 16–9. To conclude the opening day of league play, the Oshawa Machine played the Ohsweken Demons, losing 13–9.

It was announced on October 3, 2012 that the league would be expanding to three new markets: Barrie, Toronto, and St. Catharines. The Oshawa Machine would be moving to Toronto to become the Toronto Shooting Stars; the Peel Avengers would relocate to St. Catharines and the city of Barrie would be awarded an expansion team. It was also announced that the Durham Turf Dogs would be changing their name to the Oshawa Turf Dogs.

In November 2013, the defending champion Iroquois Ironmen announced that they were ceasing operations and would no longer compete in CLax. That was followed in December with the news of 2013 finalists, Toronto Shooting Stars also folding. The Brampton Inferno would become a touring team based out of Southwestern Ontario called the SouthWest Cyclops for 2014.

== Former Teams ==
Team	City	Arena	First Season	Last Season	Status
Barrie Blizzard	Barrie, Ontario	Barrie Molson Centre	2013	2016	Folded
Brampton Inferno	Brampton, Ontario	Powerade Centre	2012	2013	Relocated (SouthWest)
Durham TurfDogs	Oshawa, Ontario	GM Centre	2012	2016	Folded
Iroquois Ironmen	Hagersville, Ontario	Iroquois Lacrosse Arena	2012	2013	Folded
Niagara Lock Monsters	St. Catharines, Ontario	Meridian Centre	2013	2016	Folded
Ohsweken Demons	Hagersville, Ontario	Iroquois Lacrosse Arena	2012	2016	Folded
Oshawa Machine	Oshawa, Ontario	GM Centre	2012	2012	Relocated (Toronto)
Peel Avengers	Brampton, Ontario	Powerade Centre	2012	2012	Relocated (Niagara)
SouthWest Cyclops	Paris, Ontario	Syl Apps Community Centre	2014	2016	Folded
Toronto Shooting Stars	Toronto, Ontario	Mattamy Athletic Centre	2013	2013	Folded

== Creators' Cup championship history ==
Season	Champion	Finalist	Score	Game MVP
2012	Ohsweken Demons	Iroquois Ironmen	15–10	Chris Attwood (Ohsweken)
2013	Iroquois Ironmen	Toronto Shooting Stars	14–11	Travis Hill (Iroquois)
2014	Niagara Lock Monsters	Ohsweken Demons	10–9, OT	Davide DiRuscio (Niagara)
2015	Barrie Blizzard	Ohsweken Demons	13–12, OT	Caleb Wiles (Barrie)
2016	Durham TurfDogs	Ohsweken Demons	11–9	Dyland Goddard (Durham)

== Major awards ==
=== Players ===
Year	Season MVP	Outstanding Player	Top Offensive	Top Transition	Top Defence	Top Goalie	Top Rookie
2012	Mike Attwood (II)	Chris Attwood (OD)	Chris Attwood (OD)	John McClure (DT)	Colin Boucher (DT)	Jeff Powless (OD)	Not awarded
2013	Wayne VanEvery (OD)	Corey Fowler (NLM)	Andrew Potter (NLM)	Mack O'Brien (TSS)	Ben McCullough (BI)	Connor Danko (NLM)	Caleb Wiles (BB)
2014	Davide DiRuscio (NLM)	Chris Attwood (OD)	Caleb Wiles (BB)	Tom Montour (OD)	Colin Boucher (BB)	Davide DiRuscio (NLM)	Mike Burke (SWC)
2015	Angus Dineley (BB)	Jesse Guerin (DT)	Michael Teeter (BB)	Tom Montour (OD)	Eric Pitre (SWC)	Angus Dineley (BB)	Dan Keane (SWC)
2016	Jay Preece (NLM)	Corey Fowler (NLM)	Corey Fowler (NLM)	Thomas Hoggarth (DT)	Mitch Dumont (NLM)	Jay Preece (NLM)	Vaughn Harris (OD)

=== Team and League Officials ===
Year	Top Coach	Top Official
2012	Jason Crosbie, Jonas Derks, Brad MacArthur (DT)	Jon Watson
2013	Glenn Clark (TSS)	Wayne Paddick
2014	Jeff Dowling (NLM)	Brent Coulombe
2015	Brad MacArthur (BB)	Grant Spies
2016	Mat Giles (DT)	Grant Spies

== Statistical leaders ==
=== Team Regular Season Champions ===
Year	Team	Record	GF–GA	Points
2012	Durham TurfDogs	9-5	180-176	18
2013	Niagara Lock Monsters	11-3	231-160	22
2014	Ohsweken Demons	7-1	127-97	14
2015	Barrie Blizzard	6-2	92-76	12
2016	Niagara Lock Monsters	7-3	130-94	14

=== Runners ===
Year	Goals	Assists	Points	Penalty Mins
2012	Chris Attwood (OD) - 35 & Brad Favero (BI) - 35	Kim Squire (PA) - 38	Chris Attwood (OD) - 71	Chancy Johnson (II) - 121
2013	Wayne VanEvery (OD) - 41	Corey Fowler (NLM) - 48 & Andrew Potter (NLM) - 48	Corey Fowler (NLM) - 80	Brock Boyle (BI) - 70
2014	Chris Attwood (OD) - 27	Chris Attwood (OD) - 27	Chris Attwood (OD) - 54	Tom Montour (OD) - 34 & Jordan Dance (SWC) - 34
2015	Michael Teeter (BB) - 20	Jesse Guerin (DT) - 23	Michael Teeter (BB) - 33	Tom Montour (OD) - 42
2016	Dylan Goddard (DT) & Shane Scott (BB)	Corey Fowler (NLM) - 29	Corey Fowler (NLM) - 45	Tom Montour (OD) - 54

=== Goalies ===
Year	Minutes	Wins	Goals Against Ave	Save Percentage
2012	John Chesebrough (OM) - 640:15	Jeff Powless (OD) - 7	Jeff Powless (OD) - 11.52	Ben VanEvery (OD) - 0.793
2013	Jay Preece (BI) - 611:44	Connor Danko (NLM) - 7	Angus Dinely (TSS) - 9.57	Zach Higgins (DT) - 0.813
2014	Jay Preece (SWC) - 366:01	Davide DiRuscio (NLM) - 3	Davide DiRuscio (NLM) - 7.95	Davide DiRuscio (NLM) - 0.865
2015	Angus Dineley (BB) - 448:36	Angus Dineley (BB) - 6	Angus Dineley (BB) - 9.50	Angus Dineley (BB) - 0.801
2016				

== All-star teams ==
=== First team ===
Year	Goalie	Runners
2012	Jeff Powless (OD)	Chris Attwood (OD), Colin Boucher (DT), John McClure (DT), Ryan Campbell (PA), Brad Favero (BI)
2013	Connor Danko (NLM)	Ben McCullough (BI), Tom Montour (OD), Mack O'Brien (TSS), Andrew Potter (NLM), Wayne VanEvery (OD)
2014	Davide DiRuscio (NLM)	Colin Boucher (BB), Tom Montour (OD), Chris Attwood (OD), Caleb Wiles (BB), Andrew Potter (NLM)
2015	Angus Dineley (BB)	Jesse Guerin (DT), Tom Montour (OD), Eric Pitre (SWC), Michael Teeter (BB), Roger Vyse (OD)
2016	Jay Preece (NLM)	Mitch Dumont (NLM), Corey Fowler (NLM), Thomas Hoggarth (DT), Dan Keane (SWC), Tom Montour (OD)

=== Second team ===
Year	Goalie	Runners
2012	Mike Attwood (II)	Brad Levick (OM), Kim Squire (PA), Jon Arnold (BI), Clay Hill (OD), Ben McCullough (BI)
2013	Jay Preece (BI)	Colin Boucher (BB), Mitch Dumont (DT), Corey Fowler (NLM), Caleb Wiles (BB), Chris Attwood (II)
2014	Jake Henhawk (OD)	Tyler Burton (SWC), Jon Arnold (NLM), Mike Burke (SWC), Mark Farthing (DT), Wayne VanEvery (OD)
2015	Jay Preece (SWC)	Corey Fowler (NLM), Travis Hill (OD), Thomas Hoggarth (DT), Dan Keane (SWC), Mike Mawdsley (BB)
2016	Angus Dineley (BB)	Jake Crans (BB), Dylan Goddard (DT), Vaughn Harris (OD), Shane Scott (BB), Matt Spanger (SWC)

=== Rookie ===
Year	Goalie	Runners
2013	Connor Danko (NLM)	Caleb Wiles (BB), Mike Teeter (BB), Dustin Caravello (BI), John St. John (DT), Corey Fowler (NLM)
2014	Davide DiRuscio (NLM)	Matt Spanger (SWC), Patrick McCrory (SWC), Mike Burke (SWC), Tim Bergin (NLM), Dylan Goddard (DT)
2015	Doug Buchan (NLM)	Eric Guiltinan (SWC), Thomas Hoggarth (DT), Dan Keane (SWC), Rodd Squire (OD), Cody Ward (NLM)
2016	Gowah Adams (OD)	Phil Caputo (NLM), Vaughn Harris (OD), Cody McMahon (DT), Tyler Roche (BB), Mike Triolo (DT)

== See also ==
- Continental Indoor Lacrosse League
- National Lacrosse League
- Major Series Lacrosse
- Western Lacrosse Association
