= Barrie Blizzard =

Canadian professional indoor lacrosse team

- Founded: 2013; 13 years ago
- Folded: 2016; 10 years ago
- League: Canadian Lacrosse League
- Based in: Barrie, Ontario
- Arena: Barrie Molson Centre
- Colours: White, Purple, and Grey
- Owner: Canadian Lacrosse League
- Head coach: Brad MacArthur
- General manager: Rob Blasdell
- Championships: 1 (2015)
- Mascot: Frostbite
- Broadcasters: Stephen Stamp, Matthew Caruk
- Local media: Jim Lowe, Ron Ruff
- Website: canadianlacrosseleague.blogspot.ca

Barrie Blizzard were a Canadian professional indoor lacrosse team that played in the Canadian Lacrosse League. The team is played its home games at the Barrie Molson Centre.

== History ==
In December, 2014, eleven new players were added to the Blizzard roster. in 2015, the Blizzard won the Canadian Lacrosse League's Creator's Cup. The team's head coach was Brad MacArthur.

== Season-by-season record ==
Note: GP = Games played, W = Wins, L = Losses, T = Ties, OTL = Overtime losses, Pts = Points, GF = Goals for, GA = Goals against

Season	GP	W	L	GF	GA	P	Results	Playoffs
2013	14	3	11	134	204	6	7th CLax	Did not qualify
2014	8	4	4	96	114	8	4th CLax	Lost semi-final, 9–8 (Lock Monsters)
2015	8	6	2	92	76	12	1st CLax	Won semi-final, 11–8 (Cyclops); Won Creator's Cup, 13–12 OT (Demons)
2016	10	6	4	120	124	12	3rd CLax	Lost semi-final, 13–12 (TurfDogs)
