= SouthWest Cyclops =

- City: Paris, Ontario
- League: Canadian Lacrosse League
- Founded: June 19, 2011
- Home arena: Iroquois Lacrosse Arena
- Colours: Black, Red, and White
- Owner(s): Canadian Lacrosse League
- General manager: Jeremy Tallevi
- Head coach: Jeremy Tallevi

Franchise history
- 2012-2013: Brampton Inferno
- 2014-2016: SouthWest Cyclops

SouthWest Cyclops were a Canadian professional indoor lacrosse team that played in the Canadian Lacrosse League. The team, originally named the Brampton Inferno, played their 2015 season in Paris, Ontario.

== History ==
The team ownership was confirmed on June 19, 2011 and the team was scheduled to start play in 2012. The original Canadian Lacrosse League saw two teams in Brampton, the Inferno and the Peel Avengers, now the Niagara Lock Monsters, two teams in Six Nations, the Iroquois Ironmen and the Ohsweken Demons, and two teams in Oshawa, the Oshawa Machine, and the Durham TurfDogs.

On January 7, 2012, the Inferno played in the inaugural CLax game, defeating the Iroquois Ironmen 18–11 in Hagersville, Ontario.

In their first season, the Cyclops, then the Inferno, played a 14-game schedule and finished second in the league standings with a record of 8-6. The Inferno found themselves on the losing end of the semi-final by a score of 17-16 being defeated by the eventual Creator's Cup Champion the Ohsweken Demons.

In 2013, the Inferno recorded an identical record of 8-6 but slipped to number 4 in the standings. In the playoff picture, the Inferno were defeated by the Durham TurfDogs once again being denied a visit to the championship game.

In December 2013, after two seasons, the Inferno were renamed the SouthWest Cyclops and will play in Hagersville, Ontario out of the Iroquois Lacrosse Arena. In 2015, the team relocated to Paris, Ontario.

== Season-by-season record ==
Note: GP = Games played, W = Wins, L = Losses, T = Ties, OTL = Overtime losses, Pts = Points, GF = Goals for, GA = Goals against

Season	GP	W	L	GF	GA	P	Results	Playoffs
2012	14	8	6	203	179	16	2nd CLax	Lost semi-final, 17-16 (Demons)
2013	14	8	6	170	170	16	4th CLax	Lost quarter-final, 11-9 (TurfDogs)
2014	8	2	6	97	116	4	4th CLax	Lost semi-final, 12-10 (Demons)
2015	8	4	4	82	84	8	4th CLax	Lost semi-final, 11-8 (Blizzard)
2016	10	4	6	112	129	8	5th CLax	Did not qualify
