= Toronto Shooting Stars (CLax) =

- Founded: 2011; 14 years ago
- League: Canadian Lacrosse League
- Team history: Oshawa Machine (2012)
- Based in: Toronto, Ontario
- Arena: Mattamy Athletic Centre
- Colours: Blue, Gold and White
- Head coach: Glenn Clark
- General manager: Glenn Clark
- Website: Official CLax website

Toronto Shooting Stars were a Canadian professional indoor lacrosse team that played in the Canadian Lacrosse League. The Shooting Stars played out of the Mattamy Athletic Centre in Toronto, Ontario.

== History ==
Machine Logo 2012.

The team was founded as the Oshawa Machine in the summer of 2011.

The Machine played their first game in franchise history on January 7, 2012, in Hagersville, Ontario. The Machine lost the game to the Ohsweken Demons 19–13. The Machine finished the 2012 campaign with a record of 6-8 which was good for fifth position in the six-team league. The Machine did not qualify for the playoffs in 2012

The team was moved in the summer of 2012 and became the Toronto Shooting Stars. The Stars played in the old Maple Leaf Gardens, renamed the Mattamy Athletic Centre. The Shooting Stars finished the regular season with a record of 8-6 which put them in a three-way tie with the Ohsweken Demons and the Brampton Inferno, now the SouthWest Cyclops. Once the playoff matches were determined, the Shooting Stars found themselves in second spot and received a first-round bye. In the semi-final, the Shooting Stars were able to defeat the Durham TurfDogs by the narrowest of margins by a score of 11–10. This landed the Shooting Stars in the final against the Iroquois Ironmen. In the final game, the Ironmen were able to eke past the Toronto squad by a score of 14–11 to take the Creators Cup.

On November 8, 2013, new league owners decided to fold the Shooting Stars franchise taking the Canadian Lacrosse League to five teams.

== Season-by-season record ==
Note: GP = Games played, W = Wins, L = Losses, T = Ties, OTL = Overtime losses, Pts = Points, GF = Goals for, GA = Goals against

Season	GP	W	L	GF	GA	P	Results	Playoffs
2012	14	6	8	161	181	12	5th CLax	Did not qualify
2013	14	8	6	160	147	16	2nd CLax	Won Semi-final, 11–10 (TurfDogs); Lost Final, 14–11 (Ironmen)
