= Jay Preece =

Canadian lacrosse player

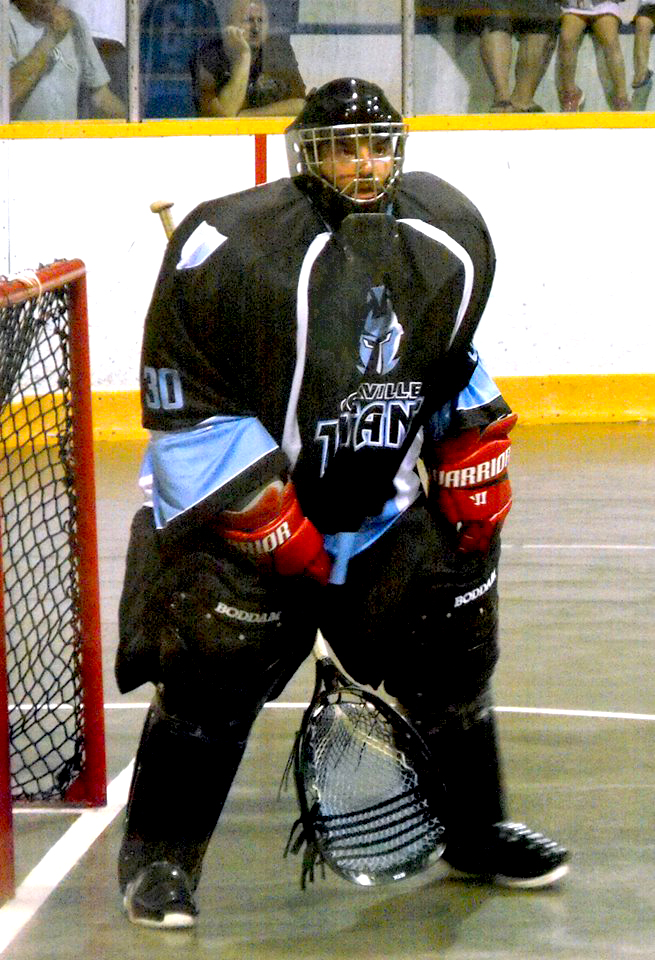

Personal information
- Born: May 21, 1981 (age 45) Mississauga, Ontario, Canada
- Height: 6 ft 3 in (191 cm)
- Weight: 200 lb (91 kg; 14 st 4 lb)

Sport
- Position: Goaltender
- Shoots: Right
- NLL team Former teams: Colorado Mammoth; Philadelphia Wings
- WLA team: Maple Ridge Burrards
- Pro career: 2007–

Jay Preece (born May 21, 1981) is a professional box lacrosse goaltender for the Colorado Mammoth in the National Lacrosse League.

== Career ==
Preece signed with the Philadelphia Wings prior to the 2007 NLL season after spending two seasons on the Toronto Rock practice squad. Prior to the 2009 NLL season, Preece signed as a free agent with the Colorado Mammoth. During the summers, Preece played in the Western Lacrosse Association with the Maple Ridge Burrards.

== Statistics ==
=== NLL ===
		Regular Season						Playoffs
Season	Team	GP	Min	GA	Sv	GAA	Sv %	GP	Min	GA	Sv	GAA	Sv %
2007	Philadelphia	6	104	24	62	13.84	72.09%	-	-	-	-	-	-
2008	Philadelphia	1	7	3	8	27.40	72.73%	-	-	-	-	-	-
NLL totals		7	114	27	70	14.65	72.16%	-	-	-	-	-	-
