= Niagara Lock Monsters =

Canadian professional indoor lacrosse team

- Founded: 2011; 15 years ago
- Folded: 2016; 10 years ago
- League: Canadian Lacrosse League
- Team history: Peel Avengers (2011-2012)
- Based in: St. Catharines, Ontario
- Arena: Meridian Centre
- Colours: Blue, Red, and White
- Head coach: Jeff Dowling
- General manager: Jeff Dowling
- Championships: 2014
- Website: Official CLax website

Niagara Lock Monsters were a Canadian professional indoor lacrosse team that played in the Canadian Lacrosse League. The Lock Monsters played out of the Meridian Centre in St. Catharines, Ontario.

== History ==
Avengers Logo 2012.

The Peel Avengers were founded in the summer of 2011 in Brampton, Ontario.

The Avengers played their first game ever on January 7, 2012 in Hagersville, Ontario. The Avengers defeated Durham TurfDogs 16-9 to pick up their first win in franchise history. The Avengers would finish the 2012 campaign with a 5-9 record landing them in last place with only 10 pts. The Avengers did not qualify for the post season.

In the summer of 2012, the team was moved to St. Catharines and renamed the Niagara Lock Monsters. The Lock Monsters finished first in the regular season standings with a record of 11-3. This earned them a bye into the semi-finals, where they fell to the Iroquois Ironmen 16-15.

On April 4, 2014, the Lock Monsters defeated the Ohsweken Demons 10-9 in overtime to win their first Creator's Cup.

== Season-by-season record ==
Note: GP = Games played, W = Wins, L = Losses, T = Ties, OTL = Overtime losses, Pts = Points, GF = Goals for, GA = Goals against

Season	GP	W	L	GF	GA	P	Results	Playoffs
2012	14	5	9	186	198	10	6th CLax	Did not qualify
2013	14	11	3	231	160	22	1st CLax	Lost semi-final, 16-15 (Ironmen)
2014	8	6	2	99	70	12	2nd CLax	Won semi-final, 9-8 (Blizzard); Won Creator's Cup, 10-9 OT (Demons)
2015	8	2	6	74	90	4	5th CLax	Did not qualify
2016	10	7	3	130	94	14	1st CLax	Lost semi-final, 13-9 (Demons)
