= Iroquois Lacrosse Arena =

Lacrosse arena in Hagersville, Ontario

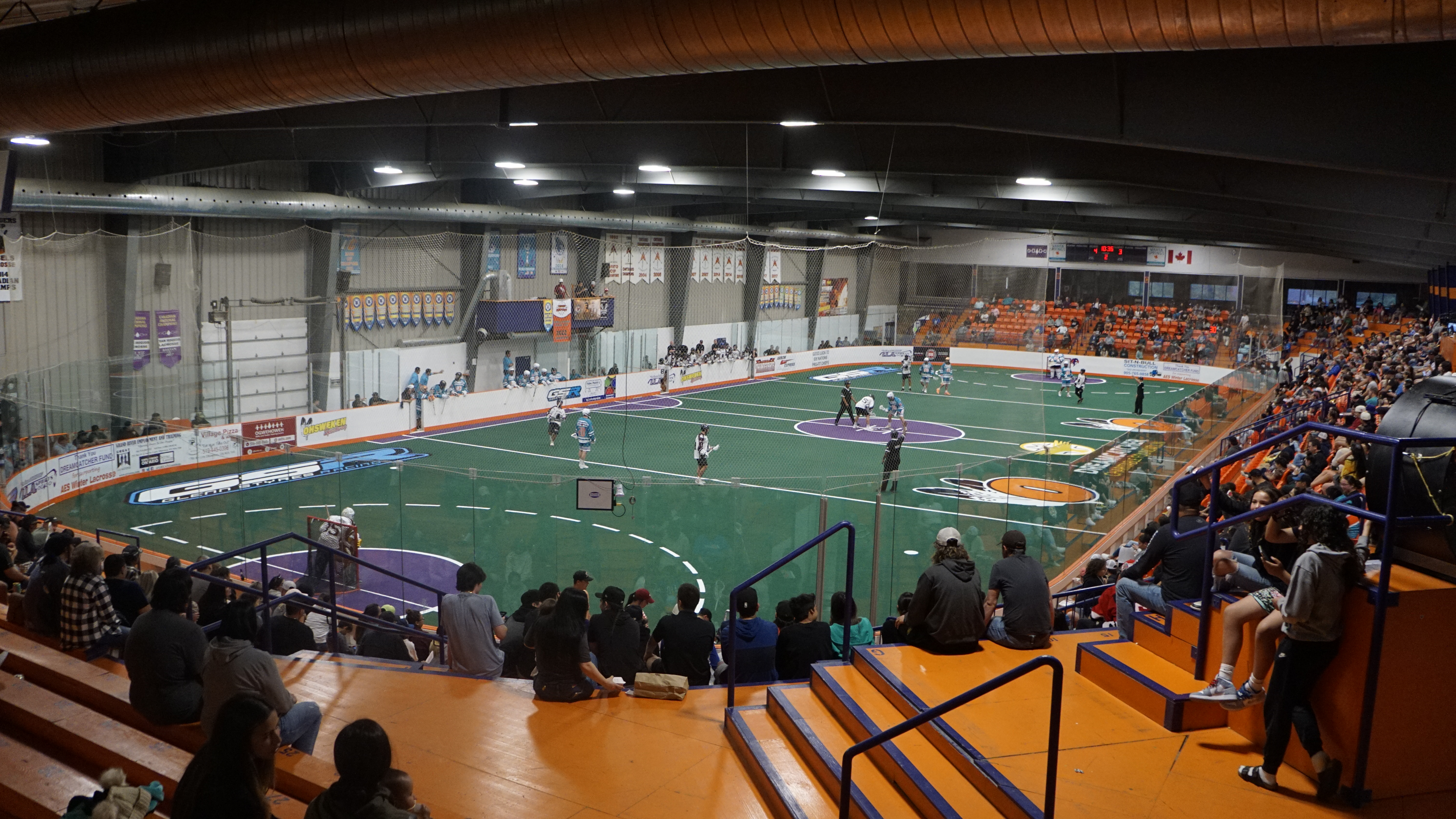
- Interactive map of Iroquois Lacrosse Arena
- Location: 3201 Second Line Rd RR 6, Hagersville, Ontario
- Coordinates: 43.0088°N 80.0614°W
- Owner: Curt Styres, Delby Powless
- Capacity: 2,300 (permanent); 3,000 (including temporary bleachers)

Construction
- Opened: 2004

Tenants
- Six Nations Chiefs (MSL); Six Nations Slash (Can-Am); Six Nations Arrows (OJALL); Six Nations Rebels (OJBLL); Six Nations Warriors (OJCLL); Former tenants SouthWest Cyclops (CLax); Ohsweken Demons (CLax)

The Iroquois Lacrosse Arena is a box lacrosse arena on the outskirts of Hagersville, Ontario, Canada on the Six Nations of the Grand River Reserve. The arena opened in 2004 and does not host hockey games as there is no refrigeration system for ice.

The arena is the home of the six-time Mann Cup winners the Six Nations Chiefs, the five-time Minto Cup winners the Six Nations Arrows, and the seven-time Founders Cup winners the Six Nations Rebels. From 2012 to 2016, the arena was home to two professional lacrosse clubs of the Canadian Lacrosse League, the SouthWest Cyclops and Ohsweken Demons.

The arena is the main practice facility of the Rochester Knighthawks. The Iroquois Lacrosse Arena hosted the 2006 Minto Cup tournament and the 2009 and 2017 Canadian Senior B Presidents Cup Championships.
