= Canadian Lacrosse League (2016) =

Governing organization for major junior lacrosse in Canada

- Sport: Box lacrosse
- Founded: 2016
- Country: Canada
- Headquarters: Winnipeg, Manitoba
- Broadcaster: TSN (WJLC)
- Website: canadianlacrosseleague.com

The Canadian Lacrosse League (CLL) is an independent Canadian junior box lacrosse organization that manages national player development and international competition. Founded in 2016, the CLL organizes Canadian teams for participation in international tournaments sanctioned by the International Indoor Junior Lacrosse (IIJL). Its activities include scouting, regional combines, team administration, and managing Canada's entries in global junior events.

== History ==
The CLL was founded in 2016 to coordinate Canada’s entry in the IIJL World Junior Lacrosse Championship, then known as the U-19 World Lacrosse Challenge. Since its formation, the organization has expanded its participation to include additional IIJL-sanctioned competitions, including age-group championships and international showcases.

== International Competition ==
The Canadian Lacrosse League represents Canada at various IIJL events, including:

- World Junior Lacrosse Championship
- World U18 Lacrosse Championship
- World U16 Lacrosse Championship
- Women's World Junior Lacrosse Championship
- Commonwealth Cup

Players are selected through regional combines held annually across Canada. Athletes chosen through this process have represented Canada at international tournaments on multiple continents, including Australia and Europe.

CLL has competed at the European Box Lacrosse Invitational (E-Box) on three (3) occasions, in 2019, 2023, and 2024.

Canada, under the CLL’s management, has won the IIJL World Junior Lacrosse Championship six (6) times. The 2022 championship concluded with Canada defeating the Haudenosaunee 16–9.

CLL-managed teams have also featured prominently in the Commonwealth Cup, with players and coaches receiving local and national media attention for their international achievements.

== Broadcasting ==
In 2021 and 2022, the Canadian Lacrosse League secured Canadian broadcast rights for the IIJL World Junior Lacrosse Championship through a partnership with TSN. Select games were televised nationally on TSN2, with full coverage available via the TSN+ streaming platform.

Earlier editions of the event were broadcast nationally in Canada on GameTV and regionally in Saskatchewan through providers such as SaskTel, MaxTV and Shaw.
