= Hagersville, Ontario =

Hagersville
- Unincorporated Community
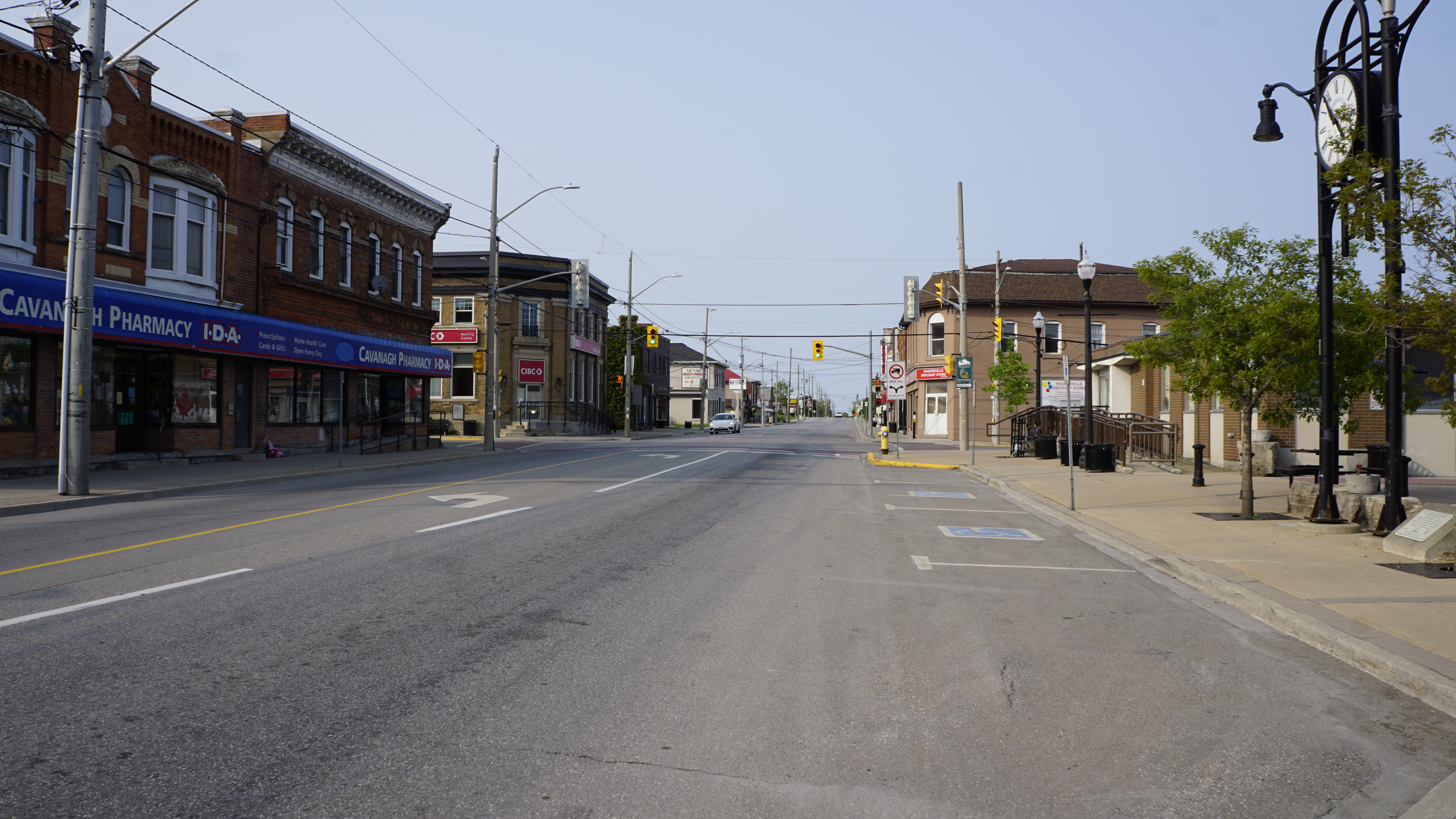

- Location within Ontario Location within Canada
- Coordinates: 42°57′35.6″N 80°03′08.3″W
- Country: Canada
- Province: Ontario
- County: Haldimand

Government
  - Mayor of Haldimand: Shelley Ann Bentley
  - Governing body: The Council of the Corporation of Haldimand County
  - Ward 4 (Hagersville) Councillor: Marie Trainer
  - MP: Leslyn Lewis (Conservative)
  - MPP: Bobbi Ann Brady (Independent)

Area
  - Land: 3.15 km^{2} (1.22 sq mi)
- Elevation: 223 m (732 ft)

Population (2021)
  - Total: 3,059
  - Density: 971.5/km^{2} (2,516/sq mi)
- Demonym: Hagersvillian
- Time zone: UTC−05:00 (EST)
  - Summer (DST): UTC−04:00 (EDT)
- Forward sortation area: N0A
- Area codes: 905, 289, 365

Hagersville is a community in Haldimand County, Ontario, Canada.

== History ==
Upon the construction of Highway 6, known formerly as the Plank Road, a small village popped up around 1855 when Charles and David Hager bought most of the land in the centre of the area. David Almas owned the land on the east side of the road, while John Porter owned the land in the west end.

The building of the Canada Southern Railroad in 1870, and of the Hamilton and Lake Erie Railway three years later helped to make Hagersville a prosperous village in 1879.

Close by the rail crossing was The Junction Hotel, later becoming The Lawson Hotel after a change in ownership. Perhaps it was best known as Murph's Place when retired NHL player Ron Murphy took ownership. It was also known as the Hagersville Inn, but today it is known as The Old Lawson House. In 1852, Charles Hager built a frame hotel at the corner of the Plank Road and Indian Line. Hagersville's first post office was in this hotel and Joseph Seymour suggested the community be called Hagersville to honour the Hager brothers. As of 2020, the Lawson property offered rooms as affordable housing for many residents.

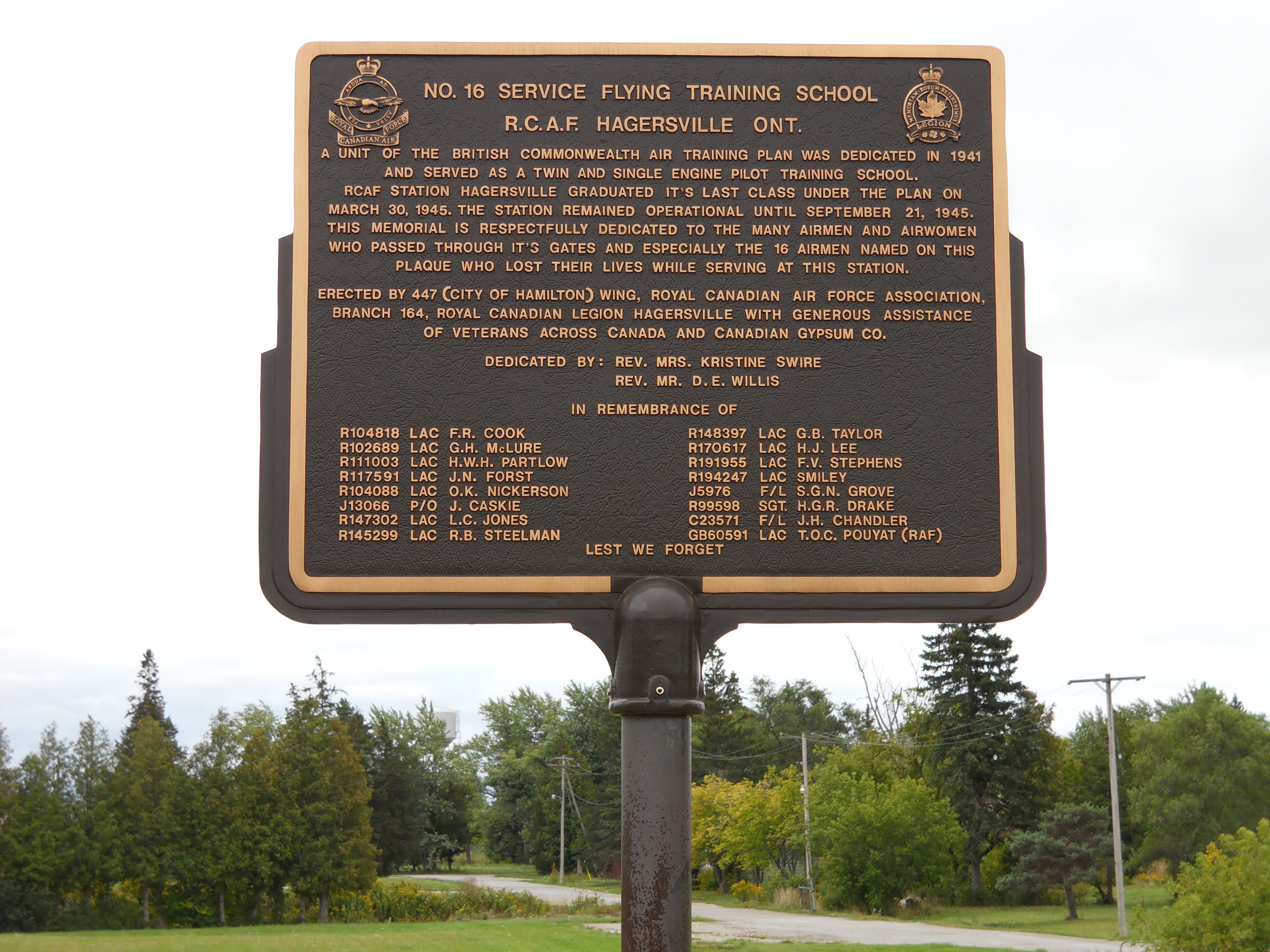
Historical plaque at the site of No. 16 Service Flying Training School

During World War II No. 16 Service Flying Training School RCAF was established by the Royal Canadian Air Force as part of the British Commonwealth Air Training Plan at 274 Concession 11 Walpole 3.5 km (2.2 mi) southwest of Hagersville. No. 16 SFTS opened on 8 August 1941 and closed on 30 March 1945. After the RCAF finished with the site it was used by the Canadian Army for various purposes and was known as Camp Hagersville. The camp was closed in 1964. Between the 1960s and 1990s, the camp was used as a residence for youth and then a flea market. As of 2013 the site was an industrial park. Some of the military homes are still there, and the housing area is known as "White Oaks Village". A good view of the site and the old hangars is had from Concession 10 Walpole. The base was located at 42°55′42″N 080°07′33″W.

In 1990, a large uncontrolled tire fire emitted fumes of toxic smoke into the atmosphere for seventeen days. The fire itself occurred on Concession 13 Walpole, about 8 km from Hagersville, but media credited it to Hagersville since it was the largest town in close proximity. The so-called "Hagersville Tire Fire" has reportedly been linked to long-term health issues, including some "rare, aggressive cancers," among firefighters who experienced the event first-hand.

== Location and airports ==
- Hagersville is approximately 45 km (28 mi) southwest of Hamilton, Ontario, 15 km (9.3 mi) southwest of Caledonia, Ontario, and 24 km (15 mi) northeast of Port Dover, Ontario.
- Hagersville's nearest airports are Hamilton/John C. Munro International Airport (CYHM) (27 km [17 mi]) (formerly Mount Hope Airport), Toronto Pearson International Airport (YYZ) (105 km [65 mi]), and Buffalo Niagara International Airport (BUF) (128 km [80 mi]).

== Climate ==
Climate data for Hagersville
Month	Jan	Feb	Mar	Apr	May	Jun	Jul	Aug	Sep	Oct	Nov	Dec	Year
Record high °C (°F)	15 (59)	18 (64)	25.5 (77.9)	30.5 (86.9)	32.5 (90.5)	35.5 (95.9)	38.5 (101.3)	36.5 (97.7)	32 (90)	28.5 (83.3)	20 (68)	18 (64)	38.5 (101.3)
Mean daily maximum °C (°F)	−0.7 (30.7)	−0.2 (31.6)	5.1 (41.2)	12.1 (53.8)	19.4 (66.9)	24.5 (76.1)	26.9 (80.4)	25.5 (77.9)	21.1 (70.0)	14.4 (57.9)	7.2 (45.0)	1.2 (34.2)	13.1 (55.6)
Daily mean °C (°F)	−4.4 (24.1)	−4.1 (24.6)	0.7 (33.3)	7 (45)	13.7 (56.7)	18.8 (65.8)	21.3 (70.3)	20.1 (68.2)	15.9 (60.6)	9.8 (49.6)	3.7 (38.7)	−2.1 (28.2)	8.4 (47.1)
Mean daily minimum °C (°F)	−8 (18)	−8 (18)	−3.8 (25.2)	1.8 (35.2)	7.9 (46.2)	13 (55)	15.7 (60.3)	14.6 (58.3)	10.6 (51.1)	5 (41)	0.1 (32.2)	−5.3 (22.5)	3.6 (38.5)
Record low °C (°F)	−26.5 (−15.7)	−26 (−15)	−20 (−4)	−11 (12)	−2.5 (27.5)	2 (36)	4.5 (40.1)	4 (39)	−2 (28)	−6 (21)	−14 (7)	−23 (−9)	−26.5 (−15.7)
Average precipitation mm (inches)	61.8 (2.43)	48.2 (1.90)	75.7 (2.98)	80.6 (3.17)	76.9 (3.03)	84.7 (3.33)	88.2 (3.47)	85.8 (3.38)	94.1 (3.70)	83.2 (3.28)	86.9 (3.42)	73.9 (2.91)	939.9 (37.00)
Source: Environment Canada

== Demographics and area ==
Hagersville is a population centre with a land area of 3.17 km^{2} (1.22 sq mi).

Hagersville's 2021 population was 3,059, a 4.1% growth from the 2016 population.

Hagersville's 2016 population was 2,815, a 14% growth from the 2011 population of 2,579. Of the total population, 87.5% are European, 9% are First Nation and 3.5% are visible minorities (mostly Filipino, South Asian and Latin American).

Hagersville is adjacent to Mississaugas of the Credit and Six Nations of the Grand River First Nation reserves.

Canada census – Hagersville community profile

	2021	2016
Population	3,059 (+4.1% from 2016)	2,939 (+14.0% from 2011)
Land area	3.15 km^{2} (1.22 sq mi)	3.17 km^{2} (1.22 sq mi)
Population density	971.5/km^{2} (2,516/sq mi)	926.3/km^{2} (2,399/sq mi)
Median age	45.2 (M: 43.6, F: 46.4)	45.1 (M: 43.8, F: 44.8)
Private dwellings	1,290 (total)	1,225 (total)
Median household income	$82,000	$68,352

References: 2021 2016

=== Ethnicity ===
Only those populations which compose more than 1% of the population have been included.

Ethnic Groups in the Community of Hagersville, Ontario (2021)
Ethnic Group	2021		2016	
Ethnic Group	Pop.	%	Pop.	%
Canadian	555	18.14%	1,170	39.81%
English	1,080	35.31%	930	31.64%
Irish	600	19.61%	530	18.03%
Scottish	720	23.54%	635	21.61%
French (Note: Statistic includes all individuals that identified as having a French origin but not otherwise specified.)	185	6.05%	225	7.66%
German	450	14.71%	440	14.97%
Italian	205	6.7%	200	6.81%
Ukrainian	50	1.63%	115	3.91%
Dutch	210	6.86%	210	7.15%
Polish	90	2.94%	60	2.04%
Norwegian	35	1.14%	10	0.34%
Portuguese	45	1.47%	20	0.68%
American	45	1.47%	20	0.68%
Hungarian	100	3.27%	50	1.7%
Mohawk	35	1.14%		
Total responses	2,970	97.09%	2,820	95.95%
Total population	3,059	100%	2,939	100%
Note: Totals greater than 100% due to multiple origin responses.

=== Language ===
As of the 2021 census, there were 2,920 citizens that spoke English only, 70 that spoke both official languages and 5 that spoke neither.

=== Religion ===
As of the 2021 census, there were 1,655 citizens identifying as Christian and 1,295 as non-religious and secular perspectives.

== Education ==
Public education in Hagersville is administered by the Grand Erie District School Board and Catholic schools by the Brant Haldimand Norfolk Catholic District School Board. Schools located in Hagersville include:

- Hagersville Secondary School
- Hagersville Elementary School
- St. Mary's School

== Activities ==
- Hagersville Memorial Arena

=== Parks ===
- Haldimand Memorial Arboretum
  - Hagersville Lions Pool
- Grant Kett Park

=== Annual ===
- Hagersville Rocks
- Hagersville Summers End Festival

== Notable people ==
- Hagersville was the birthplace of Neil Peart (1952–2020), drummer of the Canadian rock group Rush.
- Hagersville is the birthplace of Becky Kellar-Duke (1975-), who is a 4 time Olympian with 3 gold medals and 1 silver in Women's Hockey.
- Hagersville is the birthplace of Carl Reid (1950-), Roman Catholic priest, who is Ordinary of the Personal Ordinariate of Our Lady of the Southern Cross in Australia.
- Hagersville was the birthplace of Jay Silverheels (1912–1980), who played Tonto in the 1950s television series The Lone Ranger.
- Hagersville is home to the Hagersville Hawks, a junior hockey team that plays in the Niagara & District Junior C Hockey League.
