= Vincent Sombrotto (lacrosse) =

American lacrosse player

Vincent J. Sombrotto
Personal information
- National team: United States men's national lacrosse team
- Born: Port Washington, New York

Sport
- Position: Midfielder
- Shoots: Right
- NCAA team: Hofstra Pride (1979–1980)
- NLL team: New York Saints
- MLL teams: Long Island Lizards
Medal record
Representing United States
Men's lacrosse
World Lacrosse Championship
| Winner | 1982 |
| Winner | 1986 |
| Winner | 1990 |
| Winner | 1994 |

Vincent J. Sombrotto is an American former lacrosse player who played collegiate lacrosse at Hofstra University and represented the United States in international competition. An All-American at Hofstra, he was later inducted into the USA Lacrosse Hall of Fame and the Hofstra Athletics Hall of Fame. Sombrotto was a four-time gold medalist at the World Lacrosse Championships as a member of the United States men's national lacrosse team, competing in four tournaments.

== Early life and education ==
Sombrotto grew up in Port Washington, New York, and attended Chaminade High School in Mineola, New York, where he played high school lacrosse before enrolling at Hofstra University.

== Collegiate career ==
Sombrotto played lacrosse at Hofstra University during the late 1970s. In 1980, he earned United States Intercollegiate Lacrosse Association Second Team All-American honors after scoring 37 goals and recording 17 assists. He served as a co-captain for the Hofstra Pride men's lacrosse team and was later inducted into the Hofstra Athletics Hall of Fame in recognition of his collegiate career.

== National team career ==
Sombrotto represented the United States in international lacrosse competition at four consecutive World Lacrosse Championships (1982, 1986, 1990, and 1994). The United States won the gold medal at each tournament, and Sombrotto was named to the inaugural All-World Team at the 1982 championship.

He became the first player in history to be selected to four U.S. senior national teams in field lacrosse and twice served as captain of Team USA.

Reflecting on his international career decades later, Sombrotto recalled that after failing to make an earlier U.S. team, he became determined to prove that he belonged among the nation's top players.

== Club and professional career ==
Following his collegiate career, Sombrotto enjoyed an extended career in club and professional lacrosse in the United States. He was a dominant figure in U.S. club lacrosse, winning 10 national club championships and earning All-Club honors 15 times. He was also named U.S. Club Player of the Year three times.

Sombrotto also played professionally in both the National Lacrosse League (NLL) and Major League Lacrosse (MLL), including stints with the New York Saints and the Long Island Lizards. Over his professional career, he appeared in 71 games, recording 38 goals and 110 assists.

== Coaching career ==
Following his playing career, Sombrotto remained involved in professional lacrosse as a coach with the Long Island Lizards. He initially served as an assistant coach before becoming the team's head coach for the 2004 Major League Lacrosse season.

The Lizards finished the 2004 season with a 6–6 record under Sombrotto.

== Recognition and legacy ==
Sombrotto was inducted into the National Lacrosse Hall of Fame in 1997 and the Hofstra Athletics Hall of Fame in 2023. He was also inducted into the Long Island-Metropolitan Lacrosse Hall of Fame and the Port Washington Youth Activities Hall of Fame.

In 2008, Hofstra dedicated the Harry H. Royle–Vincent J. Sombrotto Men's Lacrosse Locker Room in honor of Sombrotto and former Hofstra coach and athletic administrator Harry Royle.

Sombrotto has remained involved in the sport following his playing and coaching careers. He served as chairman of the men's selection committee for the National Lacrosse Hall of Fame.
