= John Butkiewicz =

Australian field lacrosse player

Personal information
- Nationality: Australia
- Born: 9 November 1951 (age 75)

Sport
- Position: Midfield
Medal record
Men's field lacrosse
Representing Australia
World Championship
Bronze medal – third place	1978 England
Silver medal – second place	1982 United States
Bronze medal – third place	1986 Canada
Bronze medal – third place	1990 Australia

John Butkiewicz (born 9 November 1951) is an Australian field lacrosse player who was named the best midfielder at both the 1978 and 1982 World Lacrosse Championships (WLC). Butkiewicz represented Australia at a record five WLC's, from 1974 to 1990, and is in the Sport Australia Hall of Fame.

Butkiewicz popularized the lacrosse face-off "clamp" that is widely used today.
