= Haudenosaunee men's national lacrosse team =

Men's national field lacrosse team representing the Haudenosaunee

Haudenosaunee
- Nickname(s): Nationals, Nats
- WL membership: 1988
- Association: Haudenosaunee Nationals

World Championship
- Appearances: 7 (first in 1990)
- Best result: Third place (2014, 2018, 2023)
- Website: haudenosauneenationals.com
Medal record
World Lacrosse Championship
Bronze medal – third place	2014 Denver
Bronze medal – third place	2018 Netanya
Bronze medal – third place	2023 San Diego
Pan-American Lacrosse Championship
Bronze medal – third place	2026 Kingston
Canadian Field Lacrosse Championships
Bronze medal – third place	1987 Canadian Field
Lake Placid Summit Lacrosse Championships
Gold medal – first place	1990 Lake Placid

The Haudenosaunee Nationals Men's Lacrosse Team, formerly known as the Iroquois Nationals, represents the Haudenosaunee Confederacy in international field lacrosse competition. They are currently ranked third in the world by World Lacrosse after winning Bronze at the 2018 World Lacrosse Championship.

In June 2022, the Nationals dropped Iroquois from their name, adopting the name the Haudenosaunee Nationals.

The Haudenosaunee are currently seeking to compete in the 2028 Olympics under their own flag, and have received support from both the Canadian and United States governments to do so.

== History ==
=== Background ===
Lacrosse was originally played as part of a spiritual endeavour meant to praise and give thanks to the Creator, a tradition still followed today by the Haudenosaunee Nationals. For example, before each game the Haudenosaunee Nationals gather around their spiritual advisor who leads a traditional tobacco-burning rite, in addition to other rituals in an effort to prepare players before they take the field. The traditions attached to lacrosse extend to the wooden sticks, central to the Iroquois religion and culture. Specifically, males are given a miniature wooden lacrosse stick at birth, sleep with their stick nearby throughout their life, and even take one to the grave. It is believed that the first thing a Haudenosaunee does after reaching the afterlife is grab the stick placed in his coffin. The importance given to these wooden lacrosse sticks stem from the belief that these are gifts from Mother Earth. The Haudenosaunee believe that, because a living organism (i.e. a tree) died to make the stick, its spirit has been transferred to the stick's owner. Therefore, the Haudenosaunee play humbly in an attempt to honour the tree's sacrifice.

=== Modern team ===
The Iroquois Nationals men's lacrosse team was formed and sanctioned by the Grand Council of the Haudenosaunee in 1983 in preparation of friendlies at the NCAA championship in Baltimore, Maryland. The Nationals lost to the Syracuse Orangemen 28-5 and the Hobart Statesmen 22–14. Prior to the 1984 Summer Olympics, the Nationals held the Jim Thorpe Memorial Games and Pow-Wow, a 6-team event with local and international teams in Los Angeles. The nationals achieved their first victory over the national team of England. The following year, using their Haudenosaunee passports, the Nationals traveled and toured England losing only once.

The Haudenosaunee Nationals team is the only First Nation's team with international recognition as a sovereign people. After being denied membership by the International Lacrosse Federation (ILF) to compete in the 1986 World Lacrosse Championship in Canada, the Iroquois hosted the teams for preliminary games at the University at Buffalo. The ILF accepted the Iroquois as a full member nation in 1988.

The Iroquois Nationals took part in their first international competition at the 1990 World Lacrosse Championship in Australia, finishing fifth out of five teams. They warmed up for the world championship by competing in the Lacrosse USA tournament in Syracuse against top men's club teams.

In 2002, the Iroquois Nationals were recognized with an Honoring Nations award for demonstrating nation building through traditional sports. The Honoring Nations award program is administered by the Harvard Project on American Indian Economic Development.

=== Nike deal ===
Historically, the Iroquois Nationals operated on a very small budget while simultaneously trying not to accept any financial resources from the Canadian and American governments in an attempt to assert their sovereignty through financial independence.

In 2006, the Iroquois Nationals Lacrosse Program signed a partnership with Nike, Inc. in which Nike will provide the Nationals with their brand uniforms, clothing, footwear, and other equipment. The company is to develop programs to "promote wellness-and-fitness activities in Native American communities throughout the region", and team members may go to speak to local groups. Team members will also assist in testing of sustainable produced sportswear for Nike's research and development of processes to use non-toxic dyes and biodegradable organic cotton.

Nike is the only Fortune 500 company to have such a relationship with a First Nations organization, and the Iroquois Nationals are the only such group. This partnership extends beyond simply providing equipment and apparel and includes programs to promote wellness and fitness among Native American communities. This focus on the promotion of physical activity among Native Americans is part of Nike's Native American Business Program; they have worked with the Bureau of Indian Affairs and the Indian Health Service to establish and manage physical activity programs among Native American communities. These programs are particularly important given the disproportionately high rates of obesity and diabetes among Indigenous communities.

=== Passport issues ===
The Haudenosaunee Confederacy began issuing their own passports in 1927 and its holders were able to travel without problem for many years. However, with stricter security measures following the 9/11 terrorist attack, the European Union member states no longer recognized these passports as legal travel documents. While holders of these passports were still able to enter Canada, neither the United States nor Canada recognized the passports as valid travel documents.

These passports became an issue when the Iroquois Nationals attempted to enter England for the 2010 World Lacrosse Championship held in Manchester. The Nationals were unable to attend and compete in the 2010 World Lacrosse Championship in England as the United Kingdom did not accept their Iroquois passports. The Nationals’ players were told by British officials to obtain either U.S. or Canadian passports if they wished to enter the country, as the team's 23 players were eligible to be issued passports from these countries. The Iroquois Nationals refused to travel with Canadian or American passports, arguing that this would be a strike against their identity. As a result, the Nationals were forced to forfeit their three preliminary games. In 2018, the Iroquois Nationals’ travel arrangements to Israel for the World Lacrosse Championship were delayed due to passport issues once again. However, after the intervention of the Federation of International Lacrosse and the local organizing committee, the Israeli and Canadian governments were able to resolve the issue and lift the travel restrictions. As a result, the Iroquois Nationals arrived just before the opening ceremonies and their first game.

=== 2028 Summer Olympics ===
In October 2023, the International Olympic Committee (IOC) officially added lacrosse to the 2028 Summer Olympics held in Los Angeles, California. Whether the Haudenosaunee Nationals—a team not representing a member nation in the IOC—would be allowed to compete as a team in the Olympics remains a point of contention. The team has received support from both U.S. President Joe Biden and Canadian Sport Minister Carla Qualtrough, but the IOC has stated that only countries with a National Olympic Committee (NOC) would be allowed to compete, and that it would be up to the United States Olympic & Paralympic Committee (USOPC) and the Canadian Olympic Committee (COC) to allow Haudenosaunee players to play in their respective teams.

On January 17, 2025, U.S. President Joe Biden and Canadian Prime Minister Justin Trudeau released a joint statement from the White House calling on the International Olympic Committee (IOC) to allow the Haudenosaunee to compete in lacrosse at the 2028 Los Angeles Olympic Games as their own team under their own flag. They stated

While we respect the IOC’s independence, we encourage the IOC to take advantage of this historic opportunity. Permitting the Haudenosaunee to compete in lacrosse – the sport they invented – would advance the highest values of the Olympic Games and send a powerful message about respecting and valuing indigenous cultural heritage.

Haudenosaunee players are eligible to play for either Canada or the United States depending on residence. However, most Haudenosaunee players maintain that they would only play for an Indigenous team. Tom Perez, senior advisor to President Biden stated that they are "hopeful the IOC will see it our way". President Biden stated

"Their ancestors invented the game. They perfected it for a millennium... Their circumstances are unique and they should be granted an exception to field their own team at the Olympics."

Perez also stated that the U.S. is working with Canada to support inclusion in the 2028 Olympics.

== Awards ==
Event	Member	Award
2002 WLC	Neal Powless	All World Team
2006 WLC	Brent Bucktooth	All World Team - Midfield
2014 WLC	Lyle Thompson	All World Team - Attack
2014 WLC	Jeremy Thompson	All World Team - Midfield
2018 WLC	Austin Staats	All World Team - Midfield
2023 WLC	Austin Staats	Best Attackman
2023 WLC	Austin Staats	All World Team - Attack
2023 WLC	Jacob Piseno	Best Defenseman
2023 WLC	Jacob Piseno	All World Team - Defenseman

== World Lacrosse Championship ==
=== Overall results ===
World Lacrosse Championship
Year	Host	GP	W	L	GF	GA	Finish
1990	Australia	4	0	4	44	82	5th
1994	England	6	2	4	68	87	5th
1998	United States	7	2	5	56	115	4th
2002	Australia	7	2	5	55	100	4th
2006	Canada	8	4	4	125	107	4th
2010	England	3	0	3	0	3	-
2014	United States	8	5	3	96	75	3rd place, bronze medalist(s)
2018	Israel	8	5	3	94	84	3rd place, bronze medalist(s)
2023	United States	8	5	3	83	54	3rd place, bronze medalist(s)
Total		59	25	34	621	707	3 Bronze Medals

=== 1990 ===
7 July 1990 1990 Preliminary	Haudenosaunee	15−18	Canada	Perth (Australia)

8 July 1990 1990 Preliminary	Haudenosaunee	10−26	United States	Perth (Australia)

11 July 1990 1990 Preliminary	Haudenosaunee	7–23	Australia	Perth (Australia)

12 July 1990 1990 Preliminary	Haudenosaunee	12−15	England	Perth (Australia)

=== 1994 ===
20 July 1994 1994 Preliminary	Haudenosaunee	11–26	Australia	Manchester (England)

22 July 1994 1994 Preliminary	Haudenosaunee	16–2	Japan	Manchester (England)

23 July 1994 1994 Preliminary	Haudenosaunee	6–19	England	Manchester (England)

25 July 1994 1994 Preliminary	Haudenosaunee	6−26	United States	Manchester (England)

28 July 1994 1994 Preliminary	Haudenosaunee	16–20	Canada	Manchester (England)

29 July 1994 1994 5th Place Final	Haudenosaunee	19–13	Japan	Manchester (England)

=== 1998 ===
16 July 1998 1998 Preliminary	Haudenosaunee	9−13	Australia	Baltimore
				Stadium: Homewood Field

17 July 1998 1998 Preliminary	Haudenosaunee	10−9	England	Baltimore
17:00 (UTC−05:00)				Stadium: Homewood Field

18 July 1998 1998 Preliminary	Haudenosaunee	8−23	Canada	Baltimore
17:00 (UTC−05:00)				Stadium: Homewood Field

19 July 1998 1998 Preliminary	Haudenosaunee	8−20	United States	Baltimore
17:00 (UTC−05:00)				Stadium: Homewood Field

21 July 1998 1998 Quarterfinals	Haudenosaunee	12−9	Japan	Baltimore
20:00 (UTC−05:00)				Stadium: Homewood Field

22 July 1998 1998 Semifinal	Haudenosaunee	4−24	United States	Baltimore
20:00 (UTC−05:00)				Stadium: Homewood Field

24 July 1998 1998 Bronze Medal	Haudenosaunee	5−17	Australia	Baltimore
				Stadium: Homewood Field

1998 World Lacrosse Championship roster
Jersey	Name	Position	Age	Height	Weight	Team
1	Chris Hopps	Goal	27	6–0	165	Potsdam
2	Pat Solomon	Goal	20	6–0	175	Hobart
3	J.D. Jones	Mid	19	6–1	185	Mercyhurst
5	Cory Bomberry	Mid	22	5–11	195	Rochester Knighthawks
7	Owen Benedict	Mid	27	6–2	175	Long Island / Syracuse Smash
9	Dan Burnam	Attack	28	5–9	200	Nazareth
11	Scott Burnam	Mid	29	5–10	180	Cornell
12	Mike Benedict	Mid	27	5–9	170	North County CC / Syracuse Smash
13	Chip George	Def	32	6–1	185	Potsdam
14	Jim Barnes	Mid	20	5–9	175	Herkimer
15	Rex Lyons	Attack	36	5–11	190	Syracuse
16	Neal Powless	Attack	23	5–10	190	Nazareth
17	Tony Gray	Mid	26	6–2	180	Hobart
18	Tim Solomon	Mid	24	5–11	190	Hobart
19	Cam Bomberry	Attack	28	5–9	200	Nazareth / Rochester Knighthawks
20	Evan Thompson	Mid	20	5–10	175	Hobart
21	Bill Solomon	Attack	29	5–9	175	Canton
22	Al Jones	Mid	22	6–0	200	Herkimer
23	Mark Burnam	Def	34	5–10	210	Syracuse / Syracuse Smash
24	Cal Smith	Def	18	5–11	165	Wesley
29	Vince Schiffert	Def	32	5–9	160	
30	Matt Alexander	Mid	22	5–10	170	Syracuse
33	Jim Bissell	Def	34	6–0	208	
42	Gewas Schindler	Attack	22	5–11	175	Loyola
43	Marshall Abrams	Def	20	6–0	175	Syracuse
44	Joe Solomon	Goal	30	5–11	260	Cornell
	Ron Doctor	Coach				
	Dave Pittard	Coach				
	Reggie Thorpe	Coach				

=== 2002 ===
7 July 2002 2002 Preliminary	Haudenosaunee	6−22	United States	Perth (Australia)

8 July 2002 2002 Preliminary	Haudenosaunee	17−9	England	Perth (Australia)

9 July 2002 2002 Preliminary	Haudenosaunee	8−20	Canada	Perth (Australia)

10 July 2002 2002 Preliminary	Haudenosaunee	5−19	Australia	Perth (Australia)

10 July 2002 2002 Second Round	Haudenosaunee	19−14	Japan	Perth (Australia)

14 July 2002 2002 Semifinal	Haudenosaunee	8−18	United States	Perth (Australia)

14 July 2002 2002 Bronze Medal	Haudenosaunee	11−12	Australia	Perth (Australia)

=== 2006 ===
14 July 2006 2006 Preliminary	Haudenosaunee	13−10	England	London, Ontario
				Stadium: TD Stadium

15 July 2006 2006 Preliminary	Haudenosaunee	8−12	Canada	London, Ontario
				Stadium: TD Stadium

16 July 2006 2006 Preliminary	Haudenosaunee	13−11	Japan	London, Ontario
				Stadium: TD Stadium

17 July 2006 2006 Preliminary	Haudenosaunee	13−21	United States	London, Ontario
				Stadium: TD Stadium

18 July 2006 2006 Preliminary	Haudenosaunee	12−10	Australia	London, Ontario
				Stadium: TD Stadium

19 July 2006 2006 Quarterfinal	Haudenosaunee	14−6	Germany	London, Ontario
				Stadium: TD Stadium

20 July 2006 2006 Semifinal	Haudenosaunee	6−16	Canada	London, Ontario
				Stadium: TD Stadium

22 July 2006 2006 Bronze Medal	Haudenosaunee	8−21	Australia	London, Ontario
				Stadium: TD Stadium

=== 2010 ===
16 July 2010 2010 Preliminary	Haudenosaunee	0−1	Spain	Manchester (England)
		forfeit		Stadium: Armitage Centre

17 July 2010 2010 Preliminary	Haudenosaunee	0−1	Hong Kong	Manchester (England)
		forfeit		Stadium: Armitage Centre

18 July 2010 2010 Preliminary	Haudenosaunee	0−1	Norway	Manchester (England)
		forfeit		Stadium: Armitage Centre

=== 2014 ===
11 July 2014 2014 Preliminary	Haudenosaunee	15−4	England	Commerce City, Colorado
		Report		Stadium: Dick's Sporting Goods Park

12 July 2014 2014 Preliminary	Haudenosaunee	24−9	Japan	Commerce City, Colorado
		Report		Stadium: Dick's Sporting Goods Park

13 July 2014 2014 Preliminary	Haudenosaunee	8−9	Canada	Commerce City, Colorado
		Report		Stadium: Dick's Sporting Goods Park

14 July 2014 2014 Preliminary	Haudenosaunee	12−10	Australia	Commerce City, Colorado
		Report		Stadium: Dick's Sporting Goods Park

15 July 2014 2014 Preliminary	Haudenosaunee	8−15	United States	Commerce City, Colorado
		Report		Stadium: Dick's Sporting Goods Park

16 July 2014 2014 Quarterfinal	Haudenosaunee	10−8	Scotland	Commerce City, Colorado
		Report		Stadium: Dick's Sporting Goods Park

17 July 2014 2014 Semifinal	Haudenosaunee	6−12	Canada	Commerce City, Colorado
		Report		Stadium: Dick's Sporting Goods Park

19 July 2014 2014 Bronze Medal	Haudenosaunee	16−5	Australia	Commerce City, Colorado
		Report		Stadium: Dick's Sporting Goods Park

2014 World Lacrosse Championship roster
Name	College	Hometown	Notes
Myan Adams, D	Cornell University '13	Akwesasne, NY	
Adam Bomberry, M	Onondaga Community College '17	Akwesasne, NY	
Brendan Bomberry, M	University of Denver '18	Vaughan, Ontario	Graduate of The Hill Academy
Brett Bucktooth, M/A	Syracuse University '06	Nedrow, NY	Won NCAA championship in 2004
Kevin Bucktooth Jr. D	Onondaga Community College '06	Nedrow, NY	Won NJCAA National Championship in 2006
Vaughn Harris, M	Onondaga Community College '16	Six Nations, Ontario	NJCAA 1st Team All-American in 2014
Alex Kedoh Hill, M		Six Nations, Ontario	Experience in Major Series Lacrosse (MSL) league and the National Lacrosse League (NLL)
Travis Hill, D	Canisius College	Sanborn, NY	
Warren Hill, G	Syracuse University '16 (transferred from OCC in 2014)	Ohsweken, Ontario	On the Iroquois 2012 U-19 men's lacrosse team, named to All-World Team and Most Outstanding Goalie
Cody Jamieson, A	Syracuse University '10 (transferred from OCC in 2008)	Six Nations, Ontario	Won NCAA championship in 2009; on NLL's Rochester Knighthawks roster at time of selection to national team
Mike Lazore, M	Hobart College '10	Carthage, NY	On MLL's Rochester Rattlers roster at time of selection to national team
Zach Miller, M/A	University of Denver '17	Steamburg, NY	Member of Denver Pioneers
Tom Montour, D		Brantford, Ontario	On NLL's Buffalo Bandits roster at time of selection to national team
Craig Point, M	Onondaga Community College '06	Ohsweken, Ontario	Won NJCAA National Championship in 2006; on NLL's Rochester Knighthawks roster at time of selection to national team
Jeff Shattler, M		Edmonton, Alberta	
Sid Smith, D	Syracuse University '09 (transferred from OCC in 2007)	Ohsweken, Ontario	Won NCAA championship in 2008 and 2009
Taylor Smoke, D	Saint. Michael's College '09	Akwesasne, NY	
Randy Staats, A	Syracuse University '15 (transferred from OCC in 2013)	Six Nations, Ontario	
Oakley Thomas, D	Onondaga Community College '17	Akwesasne, NY	
Lyle Thompson, A	University at Albany '15	Onondaga Nation, NY	Co-Tewaraaton Award recipient in 2014 with older brother Miles; two other older brothers on team are Jeremy and Jerome
Jeremy Thompson, M	Syracuse University '11 (transferred from OCC in 2009)	Onondaga Nation, NY	Brother of Jerome, Lyle and Miles; cousin of Brett Bucktooth
Jerome "Haina" Thompson Jr., M	Onondaga Community College	Onondaga Nation, NY	Brother of Jeremy, Lyle and Miles
Miles Thompson, A	University at Albany '14	Onondaga Nation, NY	Co-Tewaraaton Trophy recipient in 2014 with younger brother Lyle; two other older brothers on team are Jeremy and Jerome
Ty Thompson, A	University at Albany '14	Onondaga Nation, NY	
Roger Vyse, A		Ohsweken, Ontario	
Marty Ward, G	Limestone College '07	Syracuse, NY	Head coach at Florida Southern College
Jeff White, G	Le Moyne College '13	Buffalo, NY	

=== 2018 ===
12 July 2018 2018 Preliminary	Haudenosaunee	9–17	United States	Netanya
20:30 (UTC+02:00)		Report		Stadium: Netanya Stadium

14 July 2018 2018 Preliminary	Haudenosaunee	18–7	England	Netanya
18:00 (UTC+02:00)		Report		Stadium: Wingate Institute

15 July 2018 2018 Preliminary	Haudenosaunee	16–9	Australia	Netanya
19:45 (UTC+02:00)		Report		Stadium: Wingate Institute

16 July 2018 2018 Preliminary	Haudenosaunee	5–10	Canada	Netanya
21:00 (UTC+02:00)		Report		Stadium: Wingate Institute

17 July 2018 2018 Playoffs	Haudenosaunee	14–7	Scotland	Netanya
18:45 (UTC+02:00)		Report		Stadium: Wingate Institute

18 July 2018 2018 Quarterfinals	Haudenosaunee	14–7	Puerto Rico	Netanya
18:00 (UTC+02:00)		Report		Stadium: Wingate Institute

19 July 2018 2018 Semifinals	Haudenosaunee	4–15	Canada	Netanya
18:00 (UTC+02:00)		Report		Stadium: Wingate Institute

20 July 2018 2018 Bronze Medal	Haudenosaunee	14–12	Australia	Netanya
20:00 (UTC+02:00)		Report		Stadium: Wingate Institute

2018 World Lacrosse Championship roster
Number	Name	Position
1	Tehoka Nanticoke	Attack
2	Miles Thompson	Attack
4	Lyle Thompson	Attack
6	Tyler Armstrong	Goalie
7	Liam Anderson	Defense
11	Taylor Smoke	Defense
15	Jake Fox (lacrosse)	Defense
18	Tyson Bomberry	Defense
19	Ron John	Midfield
21	Frank Brown	Midfield
22	Jerome "Hiana" Thompson	Midfield
24	Mike Lazore	Midfield
42	Oran Horn	Midfield
43	Brendan Bomberry	Midfield
44	Johnson Jimerson	Defense
45	Randy Staats	Attack
47	Kyle Jackson	Attack
66	Chase Scanlan	Midfield
74	Jeremy Thompson	Midfield
76	Warren Hill	Goalie
77	Jerry Staats	Defense
83	Austin Staats	Attack
91	Ty Thompson	Attack
	Mark Burnam	Head coach
	Scott Marr	Assistant coach
	Brett Bucktooth	Assistant coach
	Lars Tiffany	Assistant coach
	Tony Pineda	Trainer
	Scott Burnam	General Manager
	Mark Martin	General Manager
	Shaniece Mohawk	Team Assistant
	Ansley Jemison	Executive Director

=== 2023 ===
23 June 2023 2023 Preliminary	Haudenosaunee	18–5	England	San Diego
16:00 (UTC-07:00)		Report		Stadium: Torero Stadium

24 June 2023 2023 Preliminary	Haudenosaunee	7–9	United States	San Diego
19:00 (UTC-07:00)		Report		Stadium: Torero Stadium

25 June 2023 2023 Preliminary	Haudenosaunee	7–8	Canada	San Diego
19:00 (UTC-07:00)		Report		Stadium: Torero Stadium

26 June 2023 2023 Preliminary	Haudenosaunee	10–6	Australia	San Diego
16:00 (UTC-07:00)		Report		Stadium: Torero Stadium

27 June 2023 2023 Playoffs	Haudenosaunee	13–3	Hong Kong	San Diego
19:00 (UTC-07:00)		Report		Stadium: SDSU Sports Deck

28 June 2023 2023 Quarterfinals	Haudenosaunee	10–5	Japan	San Diego
13:00 (UTC-07:00)		Report		Stadium: SDSU Sports Deck

29 June 2023 2023 Semifinals	Haudenosaunee	7–12	Canada	San Diego
17:00 (UTC-07:00)		Report		Stadium: Snapdragon Stadium

1 July 2023 2023 Bronze Medal	Haudenosaunee	11–6	Australia	San Diego
13:00 (UTC-07:00)		Report		Stadium: Snapdragon Stadium

== World Games ==
=== Overall results ===
World Games
Year	Host	GP	W	L	GF	GA	Finish
2022	United States	4	2	2	60	65	5th
Total		4	2	2	60	65	-

=== 2022 ===
8 July 2022 2022 Preliminary	Haudenosaunee	9–21	Canada	Birmingham, Alabama
12:00 (UTC-05:00)		Report		Stadium: PNC Field

9 July 2022 2022 Preliminary	Haudenosaunee	16–12	Israel	Birmingham, Alabama
14:00 (UTC-05:00)		Report		Stadium: PNC Field

10 July 2022 2022 Preliminary	Haudenosaunee	16–20	Japan	Birmingham, Alabama
12:00 (UTC-05:00)		Report		Stadium: PNC Field

11 July 2022 2022 5th Place	Haudenosaunee	19–12	Australia	Birmingham, Alabama
12:00 (UTC-05:00)		Report		Stadium: PNC Field

2022 World Games roster
Number	Name
1	Tehoka Nanticoke
4	Jacob Patterson
15	Jake Fox
19	Shonwahnonkon Thompson
23	Brooker Muir
24	Kayson Tarbell
33	Ron John
43	Brendan Bomberry
45	Cody Jamieson
47	Kyle Jackson
74	Jeremy Thompson
76	Warren Hill

== Other tournaments and games ==
=== 1980s ===
9 June 1983 Lacrosse International	Haudenosaunee	5−28	Syracuse Orange	Baltimore
18:00 (UTC−04:00)				Stadium: Homewood Field

12 June 1983 Lacrosse International	Haudenosaunee	14−22	Hobart Statesmen	Baltimore
				Stadium: Homewood Field

1983 Lacrosse International roster
Name	Position
Louie Mitchell	Midfield
Dave White	Midfield
Doug Smoke	Midfield
Thomas Thomas	Midfield
Gregory Tarbell	Midfield
Steve Miller	Defense
Sid Jamieson	Head coach
Kenneth Fournier	Assistant coach
Ron Doctor	Assistant coach
Marty Ground	Team manager
Betsey Woodbury	Trainer
Eddy Schinler	Team manager
Kevin Nephew	Team manager

17 July 1984 Jim Thorpe Memorial Pow-Wow	Haudenosaunee	17–8	California All-Stars	Whittier, California

18 July 1984 Jim Thorpe Memorial Pow-Wow	Haudenosaunee	11–17	Canada	Whittier, California

19 July 1984 Jim Thorpe Memorial Pow-Wow	Haudenosaunee	6–15	Australia	Whittier, California

20 July 1984 Jim Thorpe Memorial Pow-Wow	Haudenosaunee	10–9	England	Whittier, California

21 July 1984 Jim Thorpe Memorial Pow-Wow	Haudenosaunee	13–22	United States	Whittier, California

1984 Jim Thorpe Memorial Pow Wow roster
Jersey	Name	Position	Tribe / Clan	College
1	Kent Lyons	Goalie	Mohawk / Wolf	
2	Travis Solomon	Goalie	Onondaga / Eel	Syracuse
3	Jim Bissel Jr.	Midfield	Tuscarora / Turtle	
4	Emmet Printup	Attack	Tuscarora / Turtle	Syracuse
5	Doug Smoke	Midfield	Mohawk / Wolf	Plattsburg
6	Steve Miller	Defense	Mohawk / Turtle	
9	Kerwin Huff	Attack	Seneca / Bear	
11	Dave White	Midfield	Mohawk / Bear	Brown
12	Ron Henry	Attack	Tuscarora / Bear	
13	Sidney Hill	Defense	Onondaga / Eel	
14	Mike Smith	Midfield	Seneca / Turtle	
15	Rex Lyons	Attack	Onondaga / Eel	
16	Tyler Sunday	Midfield	Mohawk / Wolf	
17	Mark Burnham	Midfield	Mohawk	Syracuse
18	Mikko Red Arrow	Midfield	Lenapa / Cherokee	Hofstra
19	Greg Tarbell	Attack	Mohawk / Eel	Syracuse
21	Brant Davis	Attack	Mohawk / Bear	
22	Louie Mitchell	Midfield	Mohawk / Wolf	
24	Peter Hill	Defense	Cayuga / Heron	
25	Dave Bray	Midfield	Seneca / Wolf	Cornell
26	Kevin Martin	Defense	Onondaga / Eel	Hobart
27	Barry Powless	Midfield	Onondaga / Eel	
28	Randy Crysler	Defense	Tuscarora / Turtle	
	Kimball Paterson	General Manager	Tuscarora / Turtle	
	Jim Bissell	Team manager		
	Sid Jamieson	Coach	Seneca	Cortland / Bucknell
	Ron Doctor	Coach	Mohawk	Onondaga Indian School

4 October 1985 Goodwill Tour	Haudenosaunee	12−12	England	Urmston (England)

6 October 1985 Goodwill Tour	Haudenosaunee	14−16	England	Didsbury (England)

30 September 1985 Goodwill Tour	Haudenosaunee	22−17	Sheffield Steelers	Sheffield (England)

2 October 1985 Goodwill Tour	Haudenosaunee	14−12	North of England	Whalley Range (England)

1985 Goodwill Tour	Haudenosaunee	−	Unknown	Manchester (England)

10 May 1986 Friendly	Haudenosaunee	21–13	Mohawk Lacrosse Club	Albany, New York (United States)
				Stadium: Bleecker Stadium

14 July 1986 World Lacrosse Invitational	Haudenosaunee	16−23	Australia	Buffalo, New York
17:30 (UTC−04:00)				Stadium: Rotary Field

15 July 1986 World Lacrosse Invitational	Haudenosaunee	13−32	United States	Buffalo, New York
				Stadium: Rotary Field

16 July 1986 World Lacrosse Invitational	Haudenosaunee	14−24	England	Buffalo, New York
17:30 (UTC−04:00)				Stadium: Rotary Field

3 October 1986 Fall Ball Tournament	Haudenosaunee	7−6	Clarkson Golden Knights	New York

3 October 1986 Fall Ball Tournament	Haudenosaunee	7−9	Potsdam Bears	New York

3 October 1986 Fall Ball Tournament	Haudenosaunee	6−6	Clarkson Golden Knights	New York

10 October 1987 Canadian Field Lacrosse Championships	Haudenosaunee	11−10	Ontario	Montreal

10 October 1987 Canadian Field Lacrosse Championships	Haudenosaunee	12−15	British Columbia	Montreal

11 October 1987 Canadian Field Lacrosse Championships	Haudenosaunee	–	Manitoba	Montreal

12 October 1987 Canadian Field Lacrosse Championships	Haudenosaunee	–	Manitoba	Montreal

3 September 1988 1988 Iroquois Indian Festival	Haudenosaunee	8−9	Mohawk Lacrosse Club	Cobleskill, New York (United States)

15 October 1989 Fall Ball Tournament	Haudenosaunee	–	Penn State Nittany Lions

15 October 1989 Fall Ball Tournament	Haudenosaunee	–	Villanova Wildcats

=== 1990s ===
1990 1990 Iroquois Indian Festival	Haudenosaunee	–	Connecticut Valley Lacrosse Club	Cobleskill, New York (United States)

24 March 1990 Rutgers Invitational	Haudenosaunee	4–16	Rutgers Scarlet Knights	Piscataway, New Jersey (United States)

25 March 1990 Rutgers Invitational	Haudenosaunee	18–9	Ohio State Buckeyes	Piscataway, New Jersey (United States)

15 June 1990 Lacrosse USA Invitational	Haudenosaunee	13–22	New York Athletic Club	Liverpool, New York (United States)
19:00 (UTC−05:00)				Stadium: Griffin Stadium

11 August 1990 1990 Lake Placid Summit Tournament	Haudenosaunee	12−10	Connecticut Valley Lacrosse Club	North Elba, New York
11:30 (UTC−04:00)				Stadium: Horse Show Grounds

11 August 1990 1990 Lake Placid Summit Tournament	Haudenosaunee	23−7	Ottawa	North Elba, New York
				Stadium: Horse Show Grounds

12 August 1990 1990 Lake Placid Summit Tournament	Haudenosaunee	27−2	Utica	North Elba, New York
				Stadium: Horse Show Grounds

12 August 1990 1990 Lake Placid Summit Tournament	Haudenosaunee	12−10	Mohawk Lacrosse Club	North Elba, New York
				Stadium: Horse Show Grounds

9 August 1991 1991 Lake Placid Summit Tournament	Haudenosaunee	6−11	Rochester Lacrosse Club	North Elba, New York
				Stadium: Horse Show Grounds

10 August 1991 1991 Lake Placid Summit Tournament	Haudenosaunee	–	Unknown	North Elba, New York
				Stadium: Horse Show Grounds

11 August 1991 1991 Lake Placid Summit Tournament 5th Place	Haudenosaunee	14–10	Mohawk Lacrosse Club	North Elba, New York
				Stadium: Horse Show Grounds

1993 Friendly	Haudenosaunee	–	Syracuse Orange	New York

1993 Friendly	Haudenosaunee	–	Rochester Lacrosse Club	New York

1993 Friendly	Haudenosaunee	–	Southern Tier Lax Club	New York

1993 Friendly	Haudenosaunee	–	J.P. Mulligans	New York

1993 Strength of Nations Tournament	Haudenosaunee	12−4	UC Santa Barbara Gauchos	Santa Barbara, California

1993 Strength of Nations Tournament	Haudenosaunee	8−6	Malibu Men's Lax Club	Santa Barbara, California

1993 Strength of Nations Tournament	Haudenosaunee	14−2	Whittier Poets	Santa Barbara, California

July 1998 World Masters Tournament	Haudenosaunee	2−14	Lax World	Baltimore
				Stadium: Homewood Field

July 1998 World Masters Tournament	Haudenosaunee	9−4	England	Baltimore
				Stadium: Homewood Field

July 1998 World Masters Tournament	Haudenosaunee	7−8	USA Geezers	Baltimore
				Stadium: Homewood Field

July 1998 World Masters Tournament	Haudenosaunee	5−7	Sailin Shoe	Baltimore
				Stadium: Homewood Field

=== 2000s ===
6 October 2007 Hammonassett Native American Festival	Haudenosaunee	6−12	Yale Bulldogs	Madison, Connecticut
19:00 (UTC−04:00)				Stadium: Strong Field

4 October 2008 Friendly	Haudenosaunee	11−21	Yale Bulldogs	New Haven, Connecticut
16:00 (UTC−04:00)				Stadium: Reese Stadium

11 October 2009 Hartwick Fall Ball Tournament	Haudenosaunee	14−5	Bridgton Academy	Oneonta, New York
				Stadium: Elmore Field

16 October 2009 Friendly	Haudenosaunee	8−14	Notre Dame Fighting Irish	Notre Dame, Indiana
16:00 (UTC−05:00)				Stadium: Arlotta Stadium

23 October 2009 Friendly	Haudenosaunee	20−12	Hobart Statesmen	Geneva, New York
19:30 (UTC−04:00)				Stadium: McCooey Field

=== 2010s ===
14 February 2010 Friendly	Haudenosaunee	7–26	Penn State Nittany Lions	State College, Pennsylvania
16:30 (UTC−05:00)				Stadium: Holuba Hall

30 October 2010 Friendly	Haudenosaunee	6−6	World All-Stars	Honolulu
				Stadium: Kapiolani Park

31 October 2010 2010 Hawaii Invitational Semifinal	Haudenosaunee	5−12	Crease Monkeys	Honolulu
12:30 (UTC−10:00)				Stadium: Kapiolani Park

2010 Hawaii Invitational roster
Name	Position
Marty Ward	Goalie
Spencer Lyons	Goalie
Marshall Abrams	Defense
Sid Smith	Defense
Charles Jacobs	Defense
Isaiah Kicknosway	Defense
Ron Cogan	Defense
Alex Kedoh Hill	Defense
Brett Bucktooth	Midfield
James Cathers	Midfield
Mike Lazore	Midfield
Aaron Printup	Midfield
Mike White	Midfield
Craig Point	Midfield
Matt Alexander	Midfield
Cody Jamieson	Attack
Gewas Schindler	Attack
Drew Bucktooth	Attack
Emmett Printup	Attack
Jim Barnes	
Casey Swamp	
Brandon Swamp	
Justin Gill	
Grant Bucktooth	
Cam Bomberry	Coach
Ross Bucktooth	Coach
Ed Shenandoah	Coach
Ansley Jemison	Coach
Mark Burnam	Coach
Jerome Thompson	Coach

28 September 2013 International Iroquois Nationals Fall Ball Tournament	Haudenosaunee	15−8	Israel	Cortland, New York
				Stadium: SUNY Cortland Stadium Complex

29 September 2013 International Iroquois Nationals Fall Ball Tournament	Haudenosaunee	11−14	Syracuse Orange	Cortland, New York
				Stadium: SUNY Cortland Stadium Complex

29 September 2013 International Iroquois Nationals Fall Ball Tournament	Haudenosaunee	6−7	Siena Saints	Cortland, New York
				Stadium: SUNY Cortland Stadium Complex

1 October 2017 Friendly	Haudenosaunee	6−12	Israel	Syracuse, New York
				Stadium: Carrier Dome

1 October 2017 Friendly	Haudenosaunee	7−18	Albany Great Danes	Syracuse, New York
				Stadium: Carrier Dome

=== 2020s ===
23 October 2021 Super Sixes Tournament	Haudenosaunee	16–17	Canada	Sparks, Maryland
13:15 (UTC−04:00)		Report		Stadium: William G. Tierney Field

23 October 2021 Super Sixes Tournament	Haudenosaunee	11–16	United States	Sparks, Maryland
18:15 (UTC−04:00)		Report		Stadium: William G. Tierney Field

24 October 2021 Super Sixes Tournament	Haudenosaunee	15–22	United States	Sparks, Maryland
09:30 (UTC−04:00)		Report		Stadium: William G. Tierney Field

24 October 2021 Super Sixes Tournament	Haudenosaunee	14–15	Canada	Sparks, Maryland
12:00 (UTC−04:00)		Report		Stadium: William G. Tierney Field

2021 Super Sixes roster
Name	Position
Lyle Thompson	-
Jeremy Thompson	-
Ty Thompson	-
Brendan Bomberry	-
Kyle Jackson	-
Tehoka Nanticoke	-
Jake Fox	-
Ron John	-
Mike Lazore	-
Shonwahnonkon Thompson	-
Larson Sundown	-
Koleton Marquis	-
Trey Deere	-
Ty Armstrong	-
Marshall Powless	-
Jakob Patterson	-
Kedoh Hill	-
Leroy Halftown	-
Oakley Thomas	-
Kason Tarbell	-
Vern Hill	-
Warren Hill	Goalie
Jack Vanvalkenburgh	Goalie
Peter Milliman	Head coach
Jim Barnes	Assistant coach
Nick Edinger	Equipment Manager
Sonny Shenandoah	Trainer
Roger Chrysler	General Manager
Darcy Powless	Assistant General Manager
Brian Wong	Lacrosse Operations
Jason Johnson	Advisor
Mayan Adams	Advisor
Charlie Ragusa	Communications

== See also ==
- First Nations Lacrosse Association
- Haudenosaunee national indoor lacrosse team
- Haudenosaunee women's national lacrosse team
- World Lacrosse Championship
