= Lacrosse in Canada =

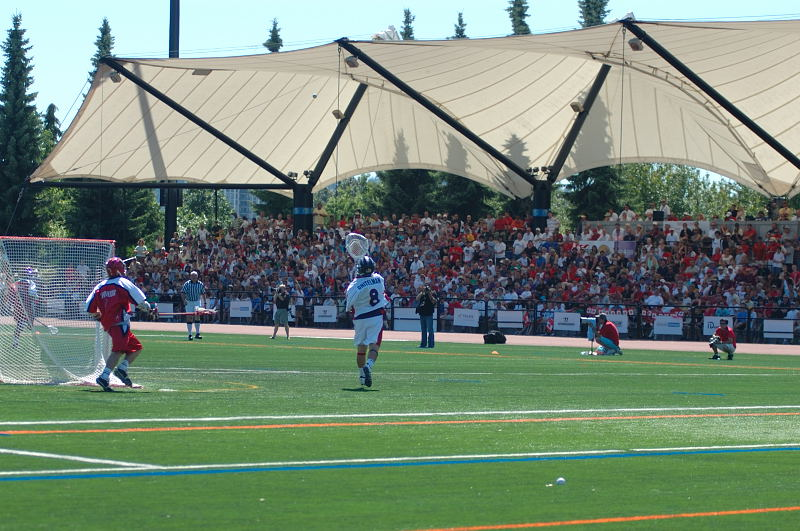
- A lacrosse game between Canada and the United States at the 2008 Men's Under-19 World Lacrosse Championships
- Country: Canada
- Governing body: Canadian Lacrosse Association
- National teams: Men's field team; Men's indoor team; Women's national team
- First played: First documented in 1600s

National competitions
- Mann Cup; Minto Cup

Club competitions
- National Lacrosse League

International competitions
- World Lacrosse Men's Championship; World Lacrosse Women's Championship; World Lacrosse Men's U20 Championship; World Lacrosse Women's U20 Championship; World Lacrosse Box Championships; World Junior Lacrosse Championship

Modern lacrosse in Canada has been a popular sport since the mid-1800s. Only field lacrosse was played until the 1930s, when box lacrosse was invented. In 1994 Parliament passed the National Sports of Canada Act which declared lacrosse to be "Canada's National Summer Sport", with ice hockey as "Canada's National Winter Sport".

== History ==
Lacrosse was played by First Nations in Canada before the arrival of European colonists. The first documented description of the game was in 1637. The game was called baggataway and tewaarathon, which was played by two teams with 100 to 1,000 men each on a field that stretched from about 500 m (1,600 ft) to 3 km (1.9 mi) long.

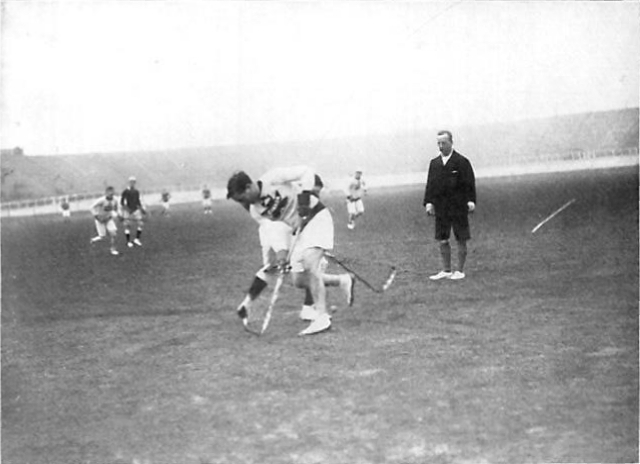
A lacrosse game between the British and Canadian national teams during the 1908 Summer Olympics.

The Anglophone middle class of Montreal adopted the game in the mid-1800s. The first known game between Europeans and First Nations took place in 1843.

In 1763, a lacrosse tournament between two First Nation tribes was utilized as a strategy to stage an ambush on the British Fort Michilimackinac during the Pontiac Rebellion. According to American historian Francis Parkman, "This was no chance stroke. It was part of a pre concentrated stratagem to inspire the surprise and destruction of the garrison…The shrill cries of the ball-players were changed to the ferocious war-whoop." Lacrosse challenged the typical British attitudes towards sport which saw games as refined and gentlemanly, while lacrosse was much more aggressive and brutal. Canadian nationalists like George Beers began advocating for lacrosse to become the national sport instead of cricket as was being pushed by British settlers.

In 1856, the Montreal lacrosse club was established; by the mid-1860s there were active teams in eastern Ontario. The National Lacrosse Association was formed in 1875; in 1880 the league became the National Amateur Lacrosse Association. By the 1880s the organized sport was found nationwide, and had become a popular spectator sport. To deal with the violence, middle class promoters spoke in Social Gospel terms about the ideal of Muscular Christianity. As working-class players and spectators became more prominent, the rhetoric focused on winning at all costs.

The 1860s the Montreal Shamrocks introduced a new level of aggressiveness; it was Irish, Catholic, and fought to win. During the 1870s and 1880s the Shamrocks had bloody confrontations with the middle-class Protestant Montreal and Toronto Lacrosse Clubs. Field lacrosse was spread across Canada by Anglophone migrants from Ontario and Quebec. In February 1887, the Toronto Lacrosse Club began using hockey as a form of exercise during the winter months. By the early 1890s it was the most popular summer game in Canada; the 1900s were the golden years, as two professional leagues were set up. Escalating violence led to the collapse of the professional leagues in 1914, and the game's base of support shrank to Montreal, Victoria, Vancouver, New Westminster, and a few small-towns. Its failure to establish a solid base derived from a thin organizational infrastructure; for example, it was not played by schools or churches. The Canadian Lacrosse Association, founded in 1925, is the governing body of lacrosse in Canada. It presently conducts national junior and senior championship tournaments for men and women in both field and box lacrosse.

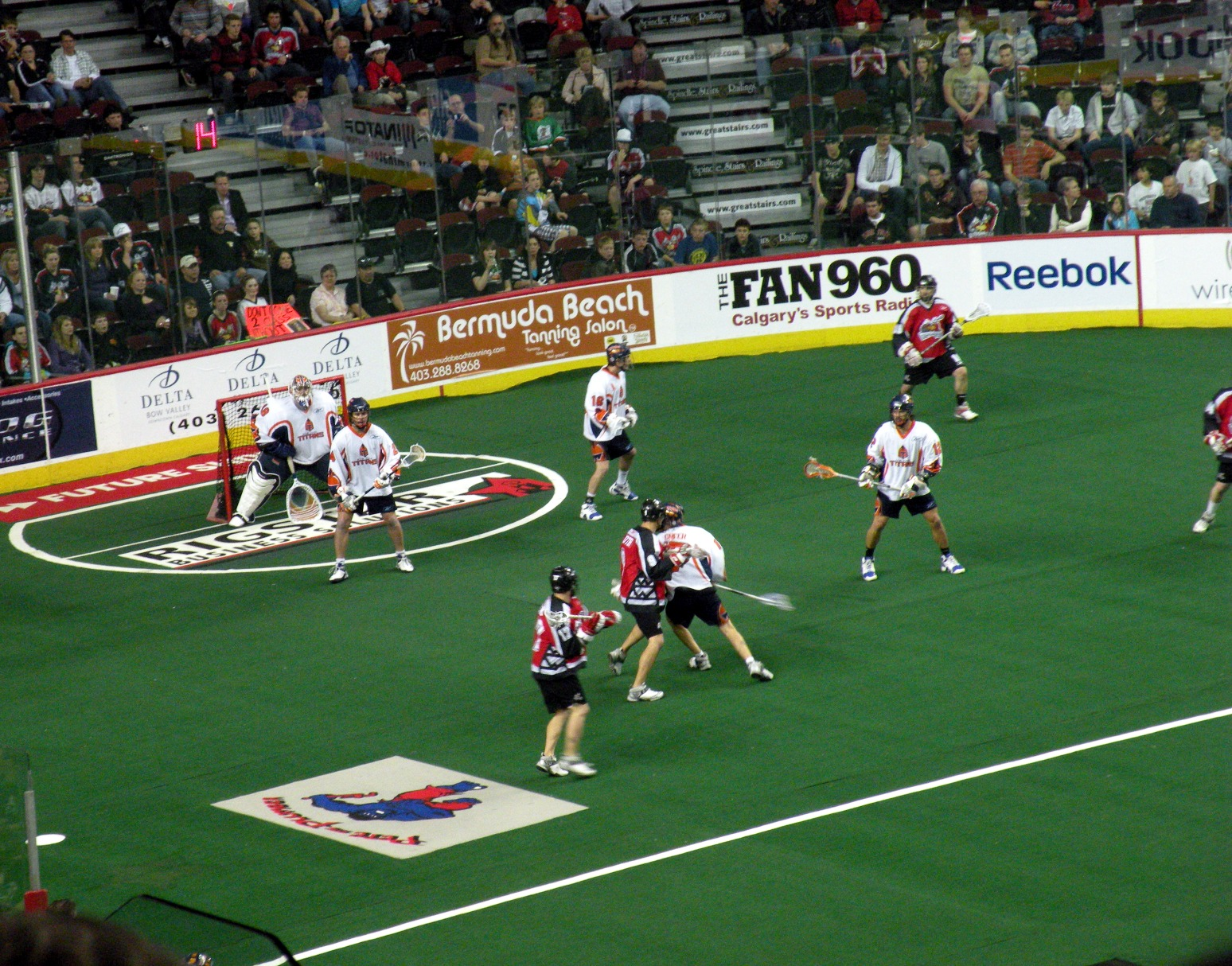
A box lacrosse at Scotiabank Saddledome in Calgary. Box lacrosse is an indoor variant of the sport first introduced in 1931.

In 1931, big city hockey promoters introduced box lacrosse to turn winter hockey fans into a year-round audience. Box lacrosse was played in a smaller indoor arena space, and competitions could also be held in baseball stadiums, and again, the play was violent. Not enough cities could support teams, however, and the hard times of the Great Depression in the 1930s reduced the number of fans. Entrepreneurs, while failing to make a major commercial success, transformed Canadian amateur lacrosse, making it quite different from field lacrosse as played in the United States, Britain, and Australia. In 1987 the National Lacrosse League began; it has clubs in twelve cities in the United States and Canada.

=== 21st century ===
In 2003, Canada participated in the inaugural World Indoor Lacrosse Championship.

The Canadian Lacrosse Association (CLA), along with five other national sporting associations, had their charitable status revoked in June 2010 as part of a Revenue Canada crackdown on Parklane Financial's tax shelter scheme, in which charitable organizations issued receipts far in excess of any material donations. The fact that the CLA Board of Directors agreed to participate in such a scheme may in part be due to the fact that the CLA Board of Directors is largely made up of elected lacrosse representatives, with no particular expertise in legal or financial matters of governance.

At the provincial level, the Ontario Lacrosse Association (OLA) controls the majority of lacrosse in Ontario. The OLA is governed by a larger Board than the CLA, though also populated largely by members with a strong lacrosse background. OLA lacrosse officials are sanctioned by the OLA, and represented by the Ontario Lacrosse Referees Association (OLRA). Unlike typical referee associations, the OLRA has a governing structure that is open only to box lacrosse officials who officiate Junior/Senior/Major-series games, though the vast majority of officials do not officiate at that level. The OLRA is an extension of the OLA, and does not represent an independent officiating union.

The National Lacrosse League is a professional box lacrosse league, with franchises in Canada and the United States. The 2006 World Lacrosse Championship was held in London, Ontario. Canada beat the United States 15–10 in the final to break a 28-year U.S. winning streak. Great achievements in Canadian Lacrosse are recognized by the Canadian Lacrosse Hall of Fame.

== Canada's national game debate ==
In May 1964, former Canadian Amateur Hockey Association president and then current member of parliament Jack Roxburgh did extensive research to find if Canadian parliament had ever declared a national game, and specifically looked into whether lacrosse was officially declared. After going through parliamentary records, he found no law was ever enacted. The Canadian Press reported at the time that the myth of lacrosse as Canada's national game possibly came from a book published in 1869 titled Lacrosse, the National Game of Canada, and that the Canadian Lacrosse Association was founded in 1867. His endeavour to declare hockey as Canada's national game coincided with the Great Canadian Flag Debate of 1964. On October 28, 1964, Roxburgh moved to introduce Bill C–132, with respect to declaring hockey as the national game of Canada.

Canadian Lacrosse Association members responded to the motion by calling it insulting and "out of line", and vowed to fight it. On June 11, 1965, Bob Prittie replied by introducing a separate bill to have lacrosse declared as Canada's national game and stated that, "I think it is fitting at this time when we are considering national flags, national anthems and other national symbols, that this particular matter should be settled now". The choice of Canada's national game was debated in 1965, but neither bill was passed when parliament was dissolved. In 1967, Prime Minister Lester B. Pearson proposed to name national summer and winter games, but nothing was resolved. Finally in April 1994, Bill C–212 was passed to recognize hockey as Canada's official winter game, and lacrosse as its summer game.

== See also ==
- Sports in Canada
