= Jeff Kennedy =

Australian lacrosse player

Personal information
- Nationality: Australia
- Born: 9 September 1955 East Fremantle, Western Australia

Sport
- Position: Midfield / Attack

Career highlights
- 1982 World Lacrosse Championship MVP; OC Isaachsen Trophy winner 1987
Medal record
Men's field lacrosse
Representing Australia
World Championship
| Bronze medal – third place | 1978 England |
| Silver medal – second place | 1982 United States |
| Bronze medal – third place | 1986 Canada |
| Bronze medal – third place | 1990 Australia |

Jeffrey Alan Kennedy (born 9 September 1955) is an Australian lacrosse player and an inaugural member of the Australian Lacrosse Hall of Fame, and inductee to the Western Australian Hall of Champions.

A lifelong member of the East Fremantle Lacrosse Club, Jeff was an accomplished lacrosse player who played in both the midfield and attack, and represented Australia in four world championships — 1978, 1982, 1986 and 1990 — earning All-World honours in both 1982 and 1986, and being named Tournament MVP in 1982.

Jeff won the Regal Cup for the Western Australian Lacrosse Association's Fairest and Best Player in 1979, 1986, and 1987, also winning the OC Isaachsen Trophy for the Best and Fairest Player among all Australian domestic club competitions. Additionally, Jeff was awarded the Don Hobbs Trophy for the Most Valuable Player of the Australian Lacrosse National Championships in 1981 and 1983.

In 2004 Jeff was inducted into the Western Australian Hall of Champions and in 2025 was inducted as part of the inaugural class into the Australian Lacrosse Hall of Fame.
