= Trevor Tierney =

American lacrosse player

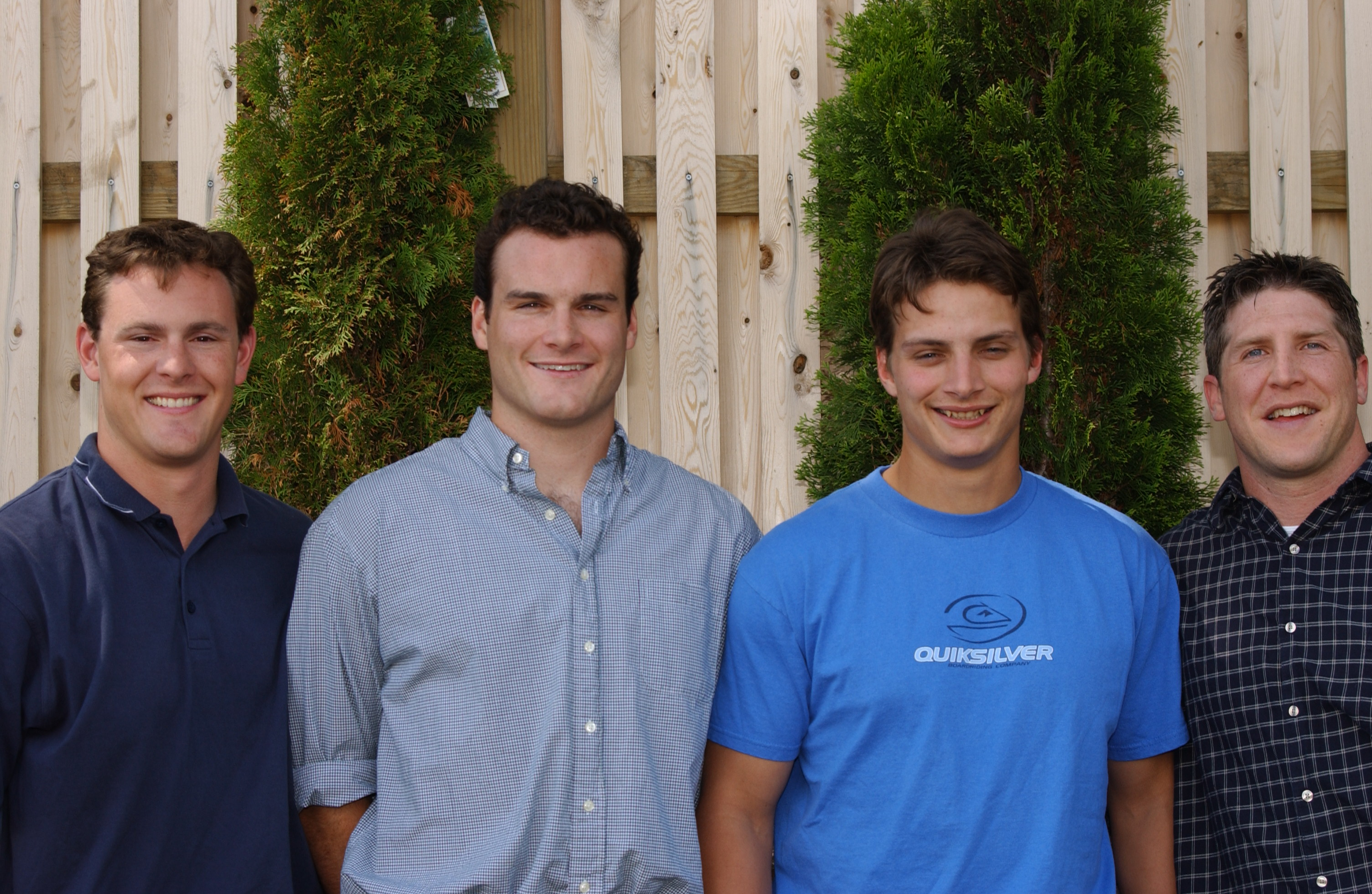

Personal information
- Nationality: American
- Website: NLL webpage

Sport
- Position: Goaltender
- NLL teams: Colorado Mammoth (2003)
- MLL teams: New Jersey Pride (2001–2004); Boston Cannons (2004); Baltimore Bayhawks (2005); Denver Outlaws (2006–2007)
- NCAA team: Princeton University
- Pro career: 2001–2007

Career highlights
- College highlights: Ensign C. Markland Kelly, Jr. Award (2001); USILA Scholar All-American (2001); All-American 3x (1st team: 2001; honorable mention: 2000); NCAA Men's Lacrosse Championship (1998 & 2001); NCAA goals against average champion (2001); NCAA save percentage champion (2001); Records: NCAA career goals against average (6.65, 2001–2006); NCAA single-season goals against average (5.70, 2001–2006); Princeton career goals against average (6.65, 2001–present); Professional highlights: Major League Lacrosse All-Star (2005, 2006 & 2007); 2002 World Lacrosse Championship All-World Team
Medal record
Representing United States
Lacrosse
World Lacrosse Championship
| Gold medal – first place | 2002 Perth | Field lacrosse |
| Silver medal – second place | 2006 London (Ontario) | Field lacrosse |

Trevor R. Tierney is a current National Collegiate Athletic Association (NCAA) men's lacrosse assistant coach, former Major League Lacrosse (MLL) defensive coordinator and retired lacrosse goaltender who has played professional box lacrosse in the National Lacrosse League (NLL) and professional field lacrosse in MLL. Trevor starred as a member of the Princeton Tigers men's lacrosse team from 1998 through 2001, where he was an NCAA goaltender of the year, two-time United States Intercollegiate Lacrosse Association (USILA) All-American (first team once), a national goals against average (GAA) and save percentage statistical champion and a member of two national champion teams.

During his time at Princeton, the team qualified for the NCAA Men's Lacrosse Championship all four years, reached the championship game three times, won the championship game twice and won four Ivy League championships. Trevor was a co-captain of the second national champion team he participated on. For five years, Tierney held the NCAA goaltending all-time records and continues to hold the Princeton University career GAA record. He is the son of Hall of Fame coach Bill Tierney.

He was a two-time Team USA goaltender for the World Lacrosse Championships and a former All-World goaltender. He is a three-time MLL All-Star and won a MLL championship. Since retiring he has become a defensive coordinator for MLL's Denver Outlaws and a defensive assistant for his fathers Denver Pioneers team.

== Background ==
Tierney attended the Hun School of Princeton, where he played goaltender.

== College career ==
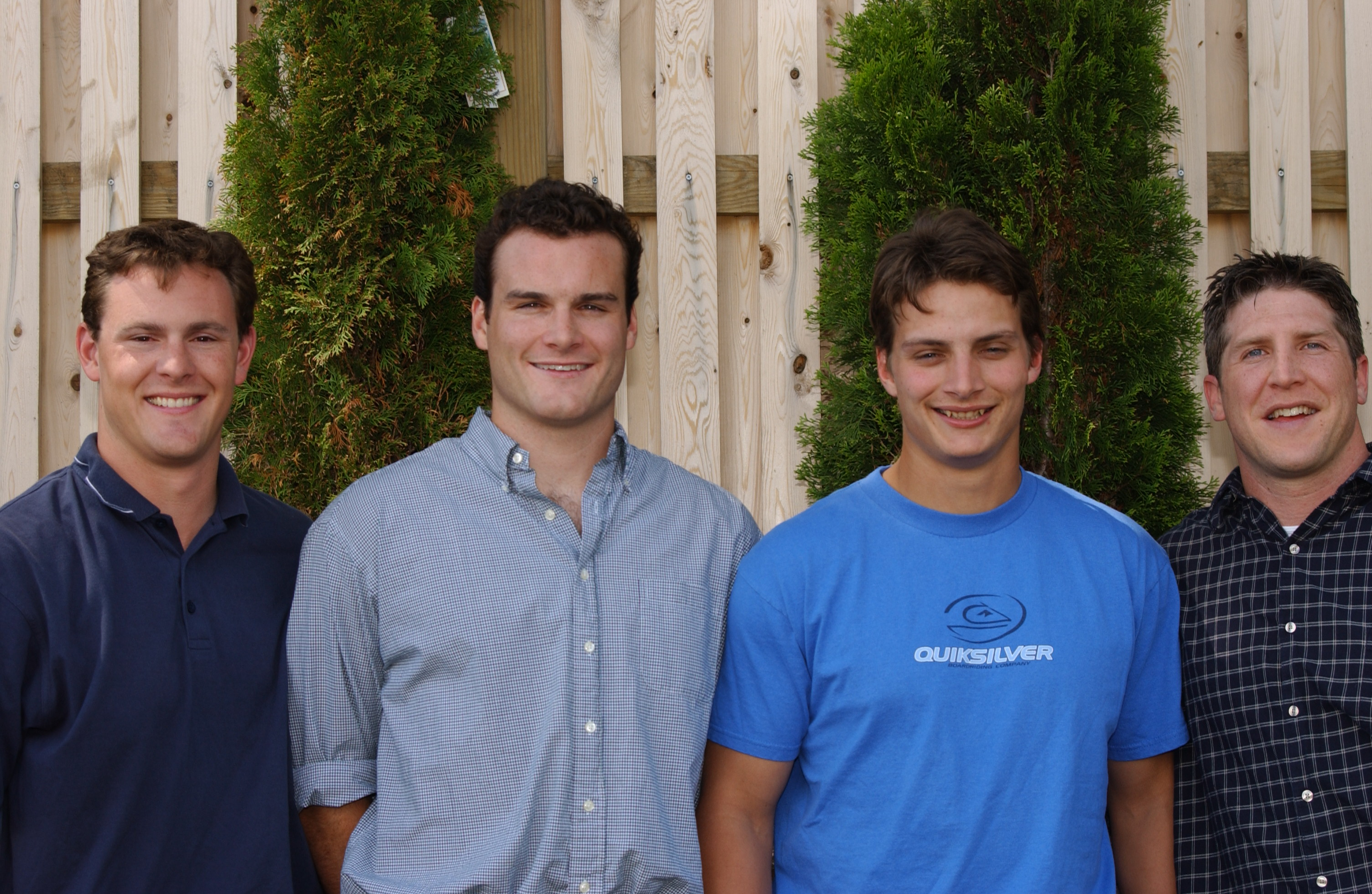
(left to right): Christian Cook, Jesse Hubbard, Tierney and Keith Elias in 2002

At Princeton Trevor Tierney was awarded the 2001 Ensign C. Markland Kelly, Jr. Award as the best National Collegiate Athletic Association (NCAA) lacrosse goaltender. He was a first team USILA All-American Team selection in 2001 and honorable mention selection in 2000. Trevor was also a 2000 honorable mention All-Ivy League selection, 2001 first team All-Ivy selection, 2000 Academic All-Ivy selection, and a 2001 USILA Scholar All-American. He served as co-captain of the 2001 team. Tierney was the 2001 national statistical champion for goals against average (GAA) (5.70) and save percentage (.671). He held NCAA the career (6.65) and single (5.70) season GAA record from 2001 until they were both surpassesd in 2006 by Navy's Matt Russell. His career GAA continues to be a Princeton record. During his four-year career, Princeton went undefeated in Ivy League Conference play with consecutive 6–0 records. Princeton was invited to the 1999 tournament, was a finalist in the 2000 tournament and earned championships in both the 1998 and 2001 tournaments, bringing the schools consecutive tournament invitations streak to twelve.

As a freshman playing for his father's team, Trevor Tierney was able to get playing time during the 1998 regular season because Princeton was winning their games by a large margin. In the 1998 NCAA championship quarterfinals, he came in as a substitute with his team behind by four goals and shut out Duke for 32 minutes as Princeton rallied for an 11– 9 victory. This led to a minor controversy over who would start for the remaining tournament games. Corey Popham ended up playing and earning NCAA Tournament Most Outstanding Player. In the semifinals of the 2000 NCAA championship, Trevor made 14 saves as his younger brother Brendan Tierney scored two fourth quarter goals to lead Princeton to a 12–11 victory over Virginia. In 2001, Trevor was one of five finalists for the Tewaaraton Trophy as the outstanding male player in college lacrosse. In the 2001 semifinal 12–11 victory over Towson State, he made game-saving last-minute point-blank saves to secure the victory.

== Professional career ==
Tierney was drafted by the New Jersey Pride with the second overall selection in the 2001 MLL Draft. He played with the Pride from 2001 until 2004 when he was traded to the Boston Cannons. He also played in the NLL with the Colorado Mammoth in 2003. In MLL, he was traded to the Baltimore Bayhawks, where he earned his first Major League Lacrosse All-Star Game selection in 2005 and a MLL Championship. In 2006, Tierney was part of what is believed to have been the largest trade in professional sports, involving 6 teams and 24 players when he was traded from the Bayhawks to the Denver Outlaws. He earned two more All-Star selections in 2006 and 2007 with the Outlaws, before becoming their defensive coordinator in 2008. Tierney retired from active play due to a series of concussions. The final career-ending concussion occurred during warm-ups on June 16, 2007 against the Rochester Rattlers.

Trevor Tierney represented Team USA at the 2002 and 2006 World Lacrosse Championships earning a gold and silver medal, respectively. On the 2006 team, he was one of four Princeton athletes. At the 2002 World Championship, he was selected as the tournament's All-World goaltender. In the semifinal match that year Trevor made seven first half saves as Team USA built a 9–2 lead over the Iroquois Nationals. He was nominated as a finalist (one of 5 goaltenders) for MLL's first All-decade team in celebration of the first ten years of the league. Trevor is the only goalie to have won an NCAA Men's Lacrosse Championship, an International Lacrosse Federation World Lacrosse Championship and a Major League Lacrosse Steinfeld Cup Championship.

In 2010, Trevor Tierney joined his father's coaching staff for the Denver Pioneers as the defensive assistant coach and yoga instructor. He left his position with the Outlaws to concentrate on his role on his father's staff.

== Personal ==
Trevor Tierney is the son of Helen and Bill Tierney and is the oldest of their four children. He is from an athletic family. In addition to his Hall of Fame father, all of his siblings are athletes and coaches. Brendan was a teammate on the 2001 championship team at Princeton. His sister Courtney Tierney, a former Franklin & Marshall basketball player, is the head girls' basketball coach at Pennington Prep. Brianne Tierney, who played lacrosse at Loyola University Maryland and Colgate University, is the head women's lacrosse coach at Kent State University, which will begin varsity play in the 2019 season. In 2019, he received a master's degree from Harvard Extension School.

== Notes ==
| Preceded by Mickey Jarboe | Ensign C. Markland Kelly, Jr. Award; 2001 | Succeeded by Nick Murtha |
| Preceded by Mickey Jarboe | NCAA Goals against average champion 2001 | Succeeded by Dan McCormick |
| Preceded by Mickey Jarboe | NCAA Save percentage champion 2001 | Succeeded by James Amandola |
