= 2002 World Lacrosse Championship =

Tournament details
- Host country: Australia
- Venue: Perth
- Dates: 7–15 July
- Teams: 15

Final positions
- Champions: United States (8th title)
- Runners-up: Canada
- Third place: Australia
- Fourth place: Haudenosaunee

Tournament statistics
- Games played: 48
- Goals scored: 1,068 (22.25 per game)

Awards
- MVP: (United States) Doug Shanahan

The 2002 World Lacrosse Championship were held between 7–15 July 2002. The event was the ninth international men's lacrosse championship, and took place in Perth, Western Australia, under the auspices of the International Lacrosse Federation. This was the second time that the tournament was held in Perth, following the 1990 tournament. Fifteen teams competed in the event in three divisions.

The United States successfully defended their title for the sixth consecutive time, defeating Canada 18–15 in the final. Australia beat the Iroquois team 12–11 for third place.

== Pool Play ==
For the pool play phase of the tournament, the teams were divided into three divisions – five in the top Blue Division, six in the Red Division, and four in the Green Division. The top three finishers in the Blue Division advanced directly to the semi-finals, while the fourth place team played the winner of the Red Division for the final semi-final spot. Green Division participants were not eligible to win the championship.

=== Blue Division ===
Pos	Team	Pld	W	L	GF	GA	GD	Qualification
1	United States	4	4	0	79	25	+54	Advanced to semi-finals
2	Canada	4	3	1	56	43	+13	Advanced to semi-finals
3	Australia	4	2	2	57	49	+8	Advanced to semi-finals
4	Iroquois	4	1	3	36	70	−34	Advanced to play-in game
5	England	4	0	4	29	70	−41	

7 July 2002
United States	22–6	Iroquois	Report
Canada	13–9	England	Report
8 July 2002
Iroquois (Haudenosaunee)	17–9	England	Report
Australia	7–22	United States	Report
9 July 2002
Canada	20–8	Iroquois	Report
England	8–19	Australia	Report
10 July 2002
United States	14–9	Canada	Report
Australia	19–5	Iroquois	Report
11 July 2002
Canada	14–12	Australia	Report
United States	21–3	England	Report

=== Red Division ===
Pos	Team	Pld	W	L	GF	GA	GD	Qualification
1	Japan	5	5	0	77	30	+47	Advanced to play-in game
2	Germany	5	4	1	56	45	+11	
3	Scotland	5	3	2	50	45	+5	
4	Sweden	5	2	3	36	56	−20	
5	Czech Republic	5	1	4	41	49	−8	
6	Wales	5	0	5	37	72	−35	

7 July 2002
Scotland	14–7	Wales	Report
Japan	19–4	Sweden	Report
Germany	11–7	Czech Republic	Report
8 July 2002
Japan	11–5	Germany	Report
Czech Republic	8–9	Scotland	Report
Wales	8–10	Sweden	Report
9 July 2002
Germany	11–8	Wales	Report
Scotland	10–5	Sweden	Report
Czech Republic	5–16	Japan	Report
10 July 2002
Japan	10–8	Scotland	Report
Czech Republic	16–5	Wales	Report
Germany	14–10	Sweden	Report
11 July 2002
Sweden	7–5	Czech Republic	Report
Germany	15–9	Scotland	Report
Japan	21–8	Wales	Report

=== Green Division ===
Pos	Team	Pld	W	L	GF	GA	GD
1	Ireland	5	5	0	80	12	+68
2	South Korea	5	3	2	70	38	+32
3	Hong Kong	5	1	4	21	64	−43
4	New Zealand	5	1	4	22	79	−57

7 July 2002
Ireland (Republic of Ireland)	16–1	Hong Kong	Report
South Korea	23–2	New Zealand	Report
8 July 2002
Ireland (Republic of Ireland)	14–5	South Korea	Report
Hong Kong	8–9	New Zealand	Report
9 July 2002
Ireland (Republic of Ireland)	19–3	New Zealand	Report
Hong Kong	3–19	South Korea	Report
10 July 2002
South Korea	20–3	New Zealand	Report
Ireland (Republic of Ireland)	15–0	Hong Kong	Report
11 July 2002
Ireland (Republic of Ireland)	16–3	South Korea	Report
Hong Kong	9–5	New Zealand	Report

== Championship Round ==
Blue Division fourth-place finisher Iroquois Nationals and Red Division winner Japan played a 1-game playoff to determine who would be the fourth and final semi-finalist in the championship bracket.

12 July 2002
Haudenosaunee	19–14 (OT)	Japan	Report

Semi-finals
14 July
United States	18
Haudenosaunee	8
14 July
Canada	15
Australia	14

Final
15 July
United States	18
Canada	15
Third place
15 July
Haudenosaunee	11
Australia	12

Tournament MVP Doug Shanahan dominated face-offs to give the USA a distinct advantage and an early lead. However, Canada came back to get to 7–6 on a Paul Gait goal in the second quarter and then finished strong before halftime to lead 9–7. The US team pulled ahead in the third quarter by three goals. Canada rallied again to tie the score before the US answered with three of their own to preserve a 18–15 victory.

== Consolation Round ==
=== 5th-8th Place ===
Play-in
14 July
England	16
Scotland	7
14 July
Japan	8
Germany	7

5th place
15 July
England	12
Japan	13
7th place
15 July
Scotland	12 (OT)
Germany	11

=== 9th-12th Place ===
Although Ireland won the Green Division, runner-up South Korea progressed to the 9th-12th place bracket because Ireland was not yet a member of the International Lacrosse Federation.

12 July 2002
Wales	19–10	South Korea	Report
14 July 2002
Czech Republic	13–7	Wales	Report
15 July 2002
Wales	12–16	South Korea	Report
Sweden	8–6	Czech Republic	Report

== Final standings ==
Rank	Team	Record
1st place, gold medalist(s)	United States	6–0
2nd place, silver medalist(s)	Canada	4–2
3rd place, bronze medalist(s)	Australia	3–3
4	Iroquois	2–5
5	Japan	7–1
6	England	1–5
7	Scotland	4–3
8	Germany	4–3
9	Sweden	3–3
10	Czech Republic	2–5
11	South Korea	4–3
12	Wales	1–7
13	Ireland	5–0
14	New Zealand	1–4
15	Hong Kong	1–4

== Awards ==
=== All World Team ===
The International Lacrosse Federation named an All World Team at the conclusion of the championship, along with four other individual awards.

Goalkeeper

(United States) Trevor Tierney

Defence

(United States) Ryan McClay
(United States) Ryan Mollett
(Canada) Steve Toll

Midfield

(United States) Doug Shanahan
(Australia) Peter Inge
(Canada) Gavin Prout

Attack

(Canada) John Grant, Jr.
(United States) Darren Lowe
(Haudenosaunee) Neal Powless

=== Best Positional Players ===
(United States) Trevor Tierney - Goalkeeper
(United States) Ryan McClay - Defence
(United States) Doug Shanahan - Midfield
(Canada) John Grant, Jr. - Attack

=== Tournament MVP ===
(United States) Doug Shanahan - Midfield, face-off

== See also ==
- Field lacrosse
- World Lacrosse, the unified governing body for world lacrosse
- World Lacrosse Championship
