= 2006 World Lacrosse Championship =

Tournament details
- Host country: Canada
- Venue(s): London, Ontario
- Dates: 14–22 July
- Teams: 21

Final positions
- Champions: Canada (2nd title)
- Runners-up: United States
- Third place: Australia
- Fourth place: Haudenosaunee

Tournament statistics
- Games played: 72
- Goals scored: 1,515 (21.04 per game)
- Attendance: 7,735 (107 per game)

Awards
- MVP: (Canada) Geoff Snider

Canada won its second gold medal at the 2006 World Lacrosse Championship, held in London, Ontario, from 14 to 22 July. The Canadians defeated the United States in the final 15–10 in front of 7,735 fans. It marked only the second loss by the Americans since the championship was founded in 1967. The first was Canada's historic 17–16 overtime win in the 1978 final. Canadian Geoff Snider was the tournament MVP for his outstanding face-off performance, winning 19 of 28 draws in the final.

Australia beat Iroquois 21–8 to earn the bronze medal. 21 nations played 72 games over the eight-day tournament, with Bermuda, Denmark, Finland, Italy, Latvia, the Netherlands, and Spain making their debuts. The games were played in TD Waterhouse Stadium.

The World Lacrosse Championship (WLC) is the international men's field lacrosse championship organized by the Federation of International Lacrosse (FIL) every four years. The 2006 WLC was the last to be sanctioned by the International Lacrosse Federation, the former governing body for men. In August 2008, the ILF merged with the former governing body for women's lacrosse, the International Federation of Women's Lacrosse Associations, to form the FIL.

== Pool play ==
For the round-robin phase of the tournament, nations were separated into blue, red, orange and yellow divisions according to strength. Each of the twenty-one nations was eligible to win the championship.

=== Blue Division ===
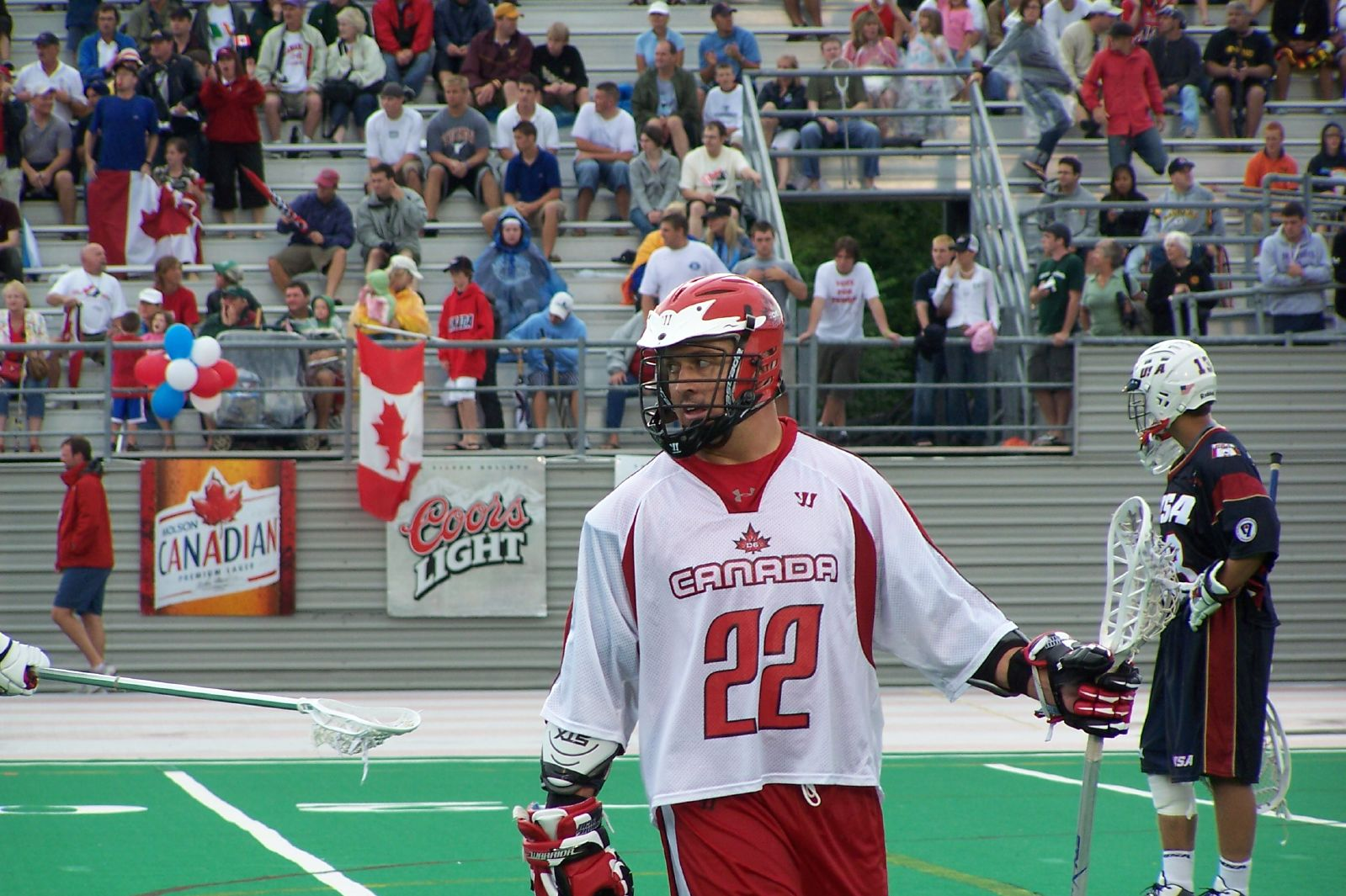
Gary Gait vs. USA

The Blue Division featured the six strongest lacrosse nations: Australia, Canada, England, Iroquois, Japan, and the United States.

Winning team	Losing team	Score
Iroquois	England	13–10
United States	Australia	20–8
Canada	Japan	18–7
United States	England	25–5
Canada	Iroquois	12–8
Australia	Japan	18–1
Australia	England	16–3
United States	Canada	13–12
Iroquois	Japan	13–11
England	Japan	9–8
United States	Iroquois	21–13
Canada	Australia	12–9
United States	Japan	21–2
Iroquois	Australia	12–10
Canada	England	17–9

Blue Division standings after pool play were:

1. United States
2. Canada
3. Iroquois
4. Australia
5. England
6. Japan

=== Red Division ===
Red Division featured the next five strongest lacrosse nations: Hong Kong, Ireland, Italy, Scotland, and Wales.

Winning team	Losing team	Score
Ireland	Hong Kong	19–4
Scotland	Italy	13–12
Ireland	Italy	15–8
Wales	Hong Kong	14–0
Italy	Hong Kong	20–0
Scotland	Wales	7–3
Italy	Wales	20–7
Ireland	Scotland	16–9
Ireland	Wales	12–4
Scotland	Hong Kong	21–3

Red Division standings after pool play were:

1. Ireland
2. Scotland
3. Italy
4. Wales
5. Hong Kong

=== Orange Division ===
The five countries competing in Orange Division were: the Czech Republic, Germany, the Netherlands, New Zealand, and South Korea.

Winning team	Losing team	Score
Netherlands	South Korea	12–4
Germany	New Zealand	18–3
Germany	South Korea	18–4
Czech Republic	New Zealand	23–4
Germany	Netherlands	15–9
Czech Republic	South Korea	20–2
Netherlands	New Zealand	15–4
Germany	Czech Republic	12–5
Czech Republic	Netherlands	19–9
South Korea	New Zealand	8–7

Orange Division standings after pool play were:

1. Germany
2. Czech Republic
3. Netherlands
4. South Korea
5. New Zealand

=== Yellow Division ===
The Yellow Division featured Bermuda, Denmark, Finland, Latvia, and Spain.

Winning team	Losing team	Score
Finland	Spain	16–11
Denmark	Bermuda	10–6
Finland	Latvia	9–3
Denmark	Spain	15–11
Latvia	Spain	11–9
Finland	Bermuda	16–3
Latvia	Denmark	7–3
Spain	Bermuda	13–9
Finland	Denmark	14–4
Latvia	Bermuda	9–3

Yellow Division standings after pool play were:

1. Finland
2. Latvia
3. Denmark
4. Spain
5. Bermuda

== Finals ==
With the nations ranked amongst their division, they played off for their final standings. The winner from each lower group played a lower-ranked nation from Blue division for their shot at the championship.

Winning team	Losing team	Score	Note
Netherlands	Latvia	10–4	Play-off for the 9th/13th place brackets
Wales	Spain	17–9	Play-off for the 13th/17th place brackets
Australia	Ireland	21–5	Quarter final
Iroquois	Germany	14–6	Quarter final
Denmark	South Korea	10–9	Play-off for the 13th/17th place brackets
Italy	Czech Republic	14–7	Play-off for the 9th/13th place brackets
Canada	Finland	27–2	Quarter final
New Zealand	Bermuda	19–6	Semi-final in the 19th place bracket
Italy	Scotland	10–7	Semi-final in the 9th place bracket
Spain	Hong Kong	12–8	Semi-final in the 17th place bracket
Latvia	Denmark	5–3	Semi-final in the 13th place bracket
England	Germany	19–4	Semi-final in the 5th place bracket
Japan	Ireland	11–9	Semi-final in the 5th place bracket
Finland	Netherlands	10–8	Semi-final in the 9th place bracket
Wales	Czech Republic	9–8	Semi-final in the 13th place bracket
USA	Australia	13–10	Semi-final
Canada	Iroquois	16–6	Semi-final
Spain	South Korea	17–14	Play-off for 17th place
New Zealand	Hong Kong	9–6	Play-off for 19th place
Scotland	Netherlands	15–3	Play-off for 11th place
Wales	Latvia	18–2	Play-off for 13th place
Czech Republic	Denmark	18–1	Play-off for 15th place
Finland	Italy	10–9	Play-off for 9th place
Ireland	Germany	13–5	Play-off for 7th place
England	Japan	12–7	Play-off for 5th place
Australia	Iroquois	21–8	3rd place
Canada	USA	15–10	Final

The final standings were:

1. Canada
2. USA
3. Australia
4. Iroquois
5. England
6. Japan
7. Ireland
8. Germany
9. Finland
10. Italy
11. Scotland
12. Netherlands
13. Wales
14. Latvia
15. Czech Republic
16. Denmark
17. Spain
18. South Korea
19. New Zealand
20. Hong Kong
21. Bermuda

== Awards ==
=== All World Team ===
The International Lacrosse Federation named an All World Team at the conclusion of the championship, along with four other individual awards.

Goalkeeper

(Canada) Chris Sanderson

Defence

(United States) John Gagliardi
(Canada) Brodie Merrill
(Australia) John Tokarua

Midfield

(Iroquois) Brett Bucktooth
(United States) Jay Jalbert
(Canada) Geoff Snider

Attack

(Canada) John Grant, Jr.
(United States) Michael Powell
(Canada) Jeff Zywicki

=== Best Positional Players ===
(Canada) Chris Sanderson - Goalkeeper
(Canada) Brodie Merrill - Defence
(United States) Jay Jalbert - Midfield
(Canada) Jeff Zywicki - Attack

=== Tournament MVP ===
(Canada) Geoff Snider - Midfield, face-off

== See also ==
- World Lacrosse Championship
- World Lacrosse, the unified governing body for world lacrosse
- Field lacrosse
