= 1982 World Lacrosse Championship =

Tournament details
- Host country: United States
- Venue(s): Homewood Field, Baltimore, Maryland
- Dates: June 18–25
- Teams: 4

Final positions
- Champions: United States (3rd title)
- Runners-up: Australia
- Third place: Canada
- Fourth place: England

The 1982 World Lacrosse Championship was the fourth World Lacrosse Championship and was played at Homewood Field in Baltimore, Maryland, from June 18–25, 1982. The United States defeated Australia in the final to win the tournament.

== Results ==
Team 1	Team 2	Score
England	Australia	5-25
United States	Canada	23-12
Canada	England	26-8
United States	Australia	23-10
United States	England	26-9
Canada	Australia	18-24

== Standings ==
Pos	Team	Pld	W	L	Pts
1	United States	3	3	0	6
2	Australia	3	2	1	4
3	Canada	3	1	2	2
4	England	3	0	3	0

== Final ==
United States 22, Australia 14

== Final standings ==
Rank	Team
1st place, gold medalist(s)	United States
2nd place, silver medalist(s)	Australia
3rd place, bronze medalist(s)	Canada
4	England

== Awards ==
=== All World Team ===
The International Lacrosse Federation named an All World Team at the conclusion of the championship, along with four other individual awards.

Goalkeeper

(United States) Tommy Sears

Defence

(United States) Mark Greenberg
(United States) Chris Kane
(England) Jeff Mounkley

Midfield

(Australia) John Butkiewicz
(United States) Vinny Sombrotto
(Canada) Bob Teasdall

Attack

(United States) Brooks Sweet
(Australia) Peter Cann
(United States) Brendan Schneck

=== Best Positional Players ===
(United States) Tommy Sears - Goalkeeper
(United States) Mark Greenberg - Defence
(Australia) John Butkiewicz - Midfield
(United States) Brooks Sweet - Attack

=== Tournament MVP ===
(Australia) Jeff Kennedy - Midfield
