= Jake Fox (lacrosse) =

Iroquois lacrosse player (born 1996)

Personal information
- Born: July 4, 1996 (age 30) Ottawa, Ontario, Canada
- Height: 6 ft 3 in (191 cm)
- Weight: 220 lb (100 kg; 15 st 10 lb)

Sport
- Position: Attack
- Shoots: Left
- NCAA team: Johns Hopkins Blue Jays
- NLL draft: 19th overall, 2019; New York Riptide

Career highlights
- 2018 Big Ten Champion

Jacob Fox (born July 4, 1996) is a former professional lacrosse player with the Halifax Thunderbirds of the National Lacrosse League (NLL). He was selected in the 2nd round, 19th overall by the New York Riptide in the 2019 NLL Entry Draft. He has also played for the Albany FireWolves and Panther City Lacrosse Club. He played collegiately with the Johns Hopkins Blue Jays.

== Early life and education ==
Jake Fox grew up in Ottawa, Ontario, and attended the Hill Academy, a sports academy in Vaughan. In 2013, he was drafted 19th overall by the Peterborough Jr. A Lakers. During his five years with the Lakers, he went on to captain the team in his final season while finishing top 10 in the league in goals, assists, points, and penalty minutes.

== Collegiate career ==
Fox joined Johns Hopkins as a top recruit, ranked as the #36 freshman and #9 freshman midfielder in the nation by Inside Lacrosse. During his four-year career with the Blue Jays, he played in 23 games, scored 3 goals, and recorded 3 assists.

GP	GS	G	A	PTS	SH	SH%	SOG	SOG%	GW	UP	DN	GB	TO	CTO	FO	FO%
2016	4	0	0	0	0	2	.000	1	.500	0	0	0	0	0	0	0-0
2017	7	0	1	1	2	7	.143	4	.571	0	0	0	1	3	0	0-0
2018	8	0	2	1	3	9	.222	5	.556	0	1	0	4	3	0	0-0
2019	4	0	0	1	1	2	.000	2	1.000	0	0	0	0	1	0	0-0
Total	23	0	3	3	6	20	.150	12	.600	0	1	0	5	7	0	0-0

== Professional career ==
Fox's professional career began when he was drafted in the 2nd round, 19th overall in the 2019 NLL Entry Draft by the New York Riptide. In his first game, he scored 1 goal and recorded 2 assists, leading him to be named NLL Rookie of the Week.

In 2023, he joined the Albany FireWolves, following a brief period with the Panther City Lacrosse Club, where he was acquired by Panther City via trade in exchange for a sixth-round pick in the 2024 Entry Draft and a third-round pick in the 2026 Entry Draft. On January 5, 2024, he was released by the FireWolves from the Evaluation list.

On February 22, 2024, he was signed to a one-year practice roster contract with the Halifax Thunderbirds, after which he was placed on the long-term Injured Reserve list.

In Major Series Lacrosse (MSL), he was a member of the 2018 Mann Cup champions Peterborough Lakers.

== International play ==
As a member of the Haudenosaunee men's national lacrosse team, he won bronze at the 2018 FIL World Championships. He has been a public advocate for the inclusion of the Haudenosaunee (Iroquois) Nationals in international competition, including the 2028 Los Angeles Olympics.
