= 1974 World Lacrosse Championship =

Tournament details
- Host country: Australia
- Venue(s): Olympic Park Stadium, Melbourne
- Dates: 30 June - 4 July
- Teams: 4

Final positions
- Champions: United States (2nd title)

Tournament statistics
- Games played: 6

Awards
- MVP: (United States) Jack Thomas

The 1974 World Lacrosse Championship was an international lacrosse tournament played at Olympic Park Stadium in Melbourne, Australia, from 30 June to 4 July 1974. It was the second World Lacrosse Championship with the first being played seven years prior. Four teams played in the 1974 championships with the United States taking out the round robin tournament defeating the other three teams that was competing in the tournament.

== Results ==
Team 1	Score	Team 2
Canada	18–14	Australia
United States	24–10	England
United States	26–15	Canada
Australia	15–3	England
United States	20–14	Australia
England	19–11	Canada

== Final standings ==
Pos	Team	Pld	W	L	GF	GA	GD	Pts
1st place, gold medalist(s)	United States	3	3	0	70	39	+31	6
=2	Australia	3	1	2	43	41	+2	2
=2	Canada	3	1	2	44	59	−15	2
=2	England	3	1	2	32	50	−18	2

== Awards ==
The International Lacrosse Federation awarded the Ray Kinderman Trophy to the Best and Fairest Player at the conclusion of the championship.

=== Tournament MVP ===
(United States) Jack Thomas
