= 1994 World Lacrosse Championship =

Tournament details
- Host country: England
- Venue(s): Gigg Lane, Bury, Greater Manchester
- Dates: July 20–30
- Teams: 6

Final positions
- Champions: United States (6th title)
- Runners-up: Australia
- Third place: Canada
- Fourth place: England

The 1994 World Lacrosse Championship was the seventh edition of the international men's lacrosse championship. It was hosted at Gigg Lane in Bury, Greater Manchester, England, from July 20–30, 1994 and won by the United States. Japan competed for the first time in the tournament.

== Results ==
Date	Team 1	Team 2	Score
July 20	Australia	Iroquois Nationals	26-11
July 20	Canada	England	19-13
July 21	United States	Japan	33-2
July 21	Australia	England	28-7
July 22	United States	Canada	16-10
July 22	Japan	Iroquois Nationals	2-16
July 23	England	Iroquois Nationals	19-6
July 23	Canada	Japan	33-7
July 24	United States	Australia	14-12
July 25	England	Japan	20-1
July 25	United States	Iroquois Nationals	26-6
July 26	Australia	Canada	11-19
July 26	United States	England	15-4
July 27	Australia	Japan	26-6
July 27	Canada	Iroquois Nationals	20-16

== Standings ==
Pos	Team	Pld	W	D	L	Pts
1	United States	5	5	0	0	10
2	Canada	5	4	0	1	8
3	Australia	5	3	0	2	6
4	England	5	2	0	3	4
5	Haudenosaunee	5	1	0	4	2
6	Japan	5	0	0	5	0

=== Bracket ===
Semi-finals
United States	25
England	3
Australia	18
Canada	17

Final
United States	21
Australia	7
Third place
England	10
Canada	25

Fifth place
Haudenosaunee	19
Japan	13

== Final standings ==
Rank	Team
1st place, gold medalist(s)	United States
2nd place, silver medalist(s)	Australia
3rd place, bronze medalist(s)	Canada
4	England
5	Haudenosaunee
6	Japan

== Awards ==
=== All World Team ===
The International Lacrosse Federation named an All World Team at the conclusion of the championship, along with four other individual awards.

Goalkeeper

(United States) Sal LoCasio

Defence

(United States) John DeTommaso
(Australia) Steve Mounsey
(United States) Dave Pietramala

Midfield

(Australia) Gordon Purdie
(Canada) Gary Gait
(Canada) Paul Gait

Attack

(Australia) Chris Brown
(United States) Mark Millon
(United States) Mike Morrill

=== Best Positional Players ===
(United States) Sal LoCasio - Goalkeeper
(United States) John DeTommaso - Defence
(Australia) Gordon Purdie - Midfield
(Australia) Chris Brown - Attack

=== Tournament MVP ===
(United States) Mark Millon - Attack

== See also ==
- Field lacrosse
- World Lacrosse, the governing body for world lacrosse
- World Lacrosse Championship
