= 1967 World Lacrosse Championship =

Tournament details
- Host country: Canada
- Venue(s): East York Stadium, Toronto, Canada
- Dates: 17-22 May

Final positions
- Champions: United States (1st title)
- Runners-up: Australia
- Third place: Canada
- Fourth place: England

Tournament statistics
- Goals scored: 53

The 1967 World Lacrosse Championship was the third World Lacrosse Championship for men's field lacrosse teams and was played in Toronto, Canada, during May 1967. The United States won the round robin tournament.

The United States were represented by their National Champions the Mount Washington Lacrosse Club from Baltimore. They beat England, Canada, and Australia. Canada was represented by box lacrosse players from the Peterborough Petes and Green Gaels.

== Results ==
Team 1	Score	Team 2
England	9–11	Australia
United States	15–3	England
Canada	11–8	England
Canada	10–18	Australia
Canada	7–18	United States
United States	25–11	Australia

== Final standings ==
Pos	Team	Pld	W	D	L	Pts
1st place, gold medalist(s)	United States	3	3	0	0	6
2nd place, silver medalist(s)	Australia	3	2	0	1	4
3rd place, bronze medalist(s)	Canada	3	1	0	2	2
4	England	3	0	0	3	0
