= 1978 World Lacrosse Championship =

Tournament details
- Host country: England
- Venue(s): Edgeley Park, Stockport, Greater Manchester
- Dates: July 2–8
- Teams: 4

Final positions
- Champions: Canada (1st title)
- Runners-up: United States
- Third place: Australia
- Fourth place: England

Tournament statistics
- Scoring leader(s): Stan Cockerton

Awards
- MVP: Mike French

The 1978 World Lacrosse Championship was the third edition of the international men's lacrosse tournament. The event took place at Edgeley Park in Stockport, England, under the auspices of the International Lacrosse Federation. Four teams competed in the tournament: Australia, Canada, England, and the United States. Canada defeated the United States 17–16 in overtime in the final to win the tournament.

== Overview ==
In the finals, Canada captured the 1978 World Championship with a shocking 17–16 overtime victory over the United States team.

The underdog label was given to the Canadian team due to their lack of field lacrosse experience, and also following a round-robin American annihilation of the Canadians, 28–4. However, three individuals with previous field experience would prove to be key factors in the longshot victory. Goalie Bob Flintoff from North Carolina State and Hall of Famers Stan Cockerton from North Carolina State and Mike French from Cornell had great tournaments. In the first game of the 1978 tournament, Cockerton whipped in seven goals with French adding three more plus seven assists to move past the host English squad 21–15.

The U.S. took Australia 22-17 the first day and then drubbed Canada 28–4. U.S. scored the first 14 goals even before French put Canada on the board; but the rout on the rain-drenched field continued - 17–2 at halftime and 22–3 after three periods. Meanwhile, Australia downed England 16–10. Down 4-3 early in game three against Australia, Canada whipped in six straight on the road to a 16–13 victory that set up a rematch with the Americans, who had narrowly squeaked past England 12–11.

The Americans opened the finals intent on repeating their earlier conquest of Canada with Cornell great Bill Marino rifling home a shot just 15 seconds after the opening faceoff. But Team Canada stunned the Americans with six unanswered goals to take an 8–4 lead after one period. The U.S. rallied to tie the contest and then moved ahead only to see Jim Wasson knot up the contest 16–16 with seconds remaining.

Stan Shillington wrote: "with the entire crowd of 3,500-plus chanting for the Canadians, both teams went through a scoreless overtime session and all but 20 seconds of a second extra period. That's when Cockerton scooped in the winner, his sixth goal of the game, that gave Canada a 17-16 victory."

=== Cultural note ===
The 1978 Canadian team was the first known sports team to use the song "We Are the Champions" by Queen as part of its victory celebration. The song, released in October 1977, was sung by the players at Edgeley Park in Stockport, England, immediately after Canada's 17–16 overtime win over the United States on 8 July 1978. Team members later recalled that the track was chosen spontaneously and became an unofficial anthem for their historic world title—the first in Canadian field lacrosse history.

== Correction to 1978 World Championship scoring attribution and legacy ==
A long-standing reporting error originated from an early Canadian Press (CP) wire story distributed immediately after the 1978 World Lacrosse Championship final in Stockport, England. The CP summary, reprinted internationally, incorrectly credited Stan Cockerton with both the tying and winning goals in Canada's 17–16 overtime victory over the United States.

Subsequent firsthand accounts from team members and later interviews clarified the actual scoring sequence. According to multiple players, Cockerton's controversial goal late in regulation narrowed the U.S. lead to 16–15, while Jim Wasson of Peterborough, Ontario, scored the tying goal (16–16) in the final minute to force overtime. Canada then scored in overtime to secure its first world field lacrosse title.

=== Legacy and impact ===
Canada's 1978 victory is widely regarded as a turning point in international field lacrosse. It marked the first time the United States had lost a world championship and showcased the effectiveness of Canadian box-lacrosse players adapting to the outdoor game. Many members of the 1978 roster — including Mike French, Stan Cockerton, Jim Wasson, and John Grant Sr. — went on to play pivotal roles in advancing the sport in Canada and internationally.

The upset reshaped the balance of world lacrosse, inspiring new field lacrosse programs across Canada and contributing to competitive national teams in later tournaments such as 1982 (Baltimore) and 1986 (Toronto). Historians and former players often cite the 1978 championship as a defining moment that bridged Canada's indoor and outdoor lacrosse traditions and established the nation as a perennial contender on the international stage.

Stan Cockerton led the tourney in scoring with 18 goals and 9 assists in the four games. Mike French, with 6 goals and 15 assists, was named the "Best and Fairest Player." Other awards were given to Bob Flintoff, Canada, Goalkeeper; Steve Bevington, England, Defender; John Butkiewicz, Australia, Midfielder; and Peter Cann, Australia, Attackman.

Australia beat England 19-9 for third place.

== Results ==
=== Group ===
Date	Team 1	Team 2	Score
July 2	Canada	England	21-15
July 2	United States	Australia	22-17
July 4	United States	Canada	28-4
July 4	England	Australia	10-16
July 5	United States	England	12-11
July 5	Canada	Australia	16-13

=== Standings ===
Pos	Team	Pld	W	D	L	GF	GA	GD	Pts
1	United States	3	3	0	0	62	32	+30	6
2	Canada	3	2	0	1	41	56	−15	4
3	Australia	3	1	0	2	46	48	−2	2
4	England	3	0	0	3	36	49	−13	0

=== Third place ===
- Australia 19, England 9

=== Final ===
July 8, 1978

- Canada 17, United States 16 (OT)

== Rosters ==
=== Canada ===
Goal: Bob Flintoff, Tim Barrie
Defense: Sandy Lynch, Carm Collins, Brian Jones, Jim Branton, Murray Cawker, Fred Greenwood
Midfield: Pat Differ, John Mouradian, Jim Calder, Ted Greves, Dave Huntley, Dan Wilson, Jim Wasson, Doug Hayes, Bob Burke,
Attack: Stan Cockerton, Mike French, Dave Durante, John Grant, Steve Mastine, Tim Briscoe
Coaches: Bob Allan, Don Barrie, John McCauley
Manager: Ron Wicks

=== United States ===
Goal: Rick Blick, Dan Mackesey
Defense: Dave Devine, Chris Kane, Tom Keigler, Dom Starsia, Dennis Townsend, Mike Waldvogel
Midfield: Jim Darcangelo, Craig Jaeger, Skip Lichtfuss, Billy Marino, Phil Marino, Dave McNaney, Doug Radebaugh, Bob Hendrickson, Bruce Arena
Attack: Eamon McEneaney, Bob Griebe, Jeff Long, Tom Postel, Dave Warfield
Head Coach: Richie Moran
Assistant Coaches: Jerry Schmidt, Gene Fusting

== Awards ==
The International Lacrosse Federation named best positional players and a Most Valuable Player at the conclusion of the championship.

=== Best positional players ===
(Canada) Bob Flintoff - Goalkeeper
(England) Steve Bevington - Defence
(Australia) John Butkiewicz - Midfield
(Australia) Peter Cann - Attack

=== Tournament MVP ===
(Canada) Mike French - Attack

== See also ==
- World Lacrosse Championship
- Field lacrosse
- Federation of International Lacrosse, the unified governing body for world lacrosse founded in 2008
