= Canada men's national lacrosse team =

Canada
- Association: Lacrosse Canada
- Head coach: Randy Mearns

World Championship
- Appearances: 13 (first in 1967)
- Best result: (gold) Gold: 3 (1978, 2006, 2014)
Medal record
World Lacrosse Championship
Bronze medal – third place	1967 Toronto
Silver medal – second place	1974 Melbourne
Gold medal – first place	1978 Stockport
Bronze medal – third place	1982 Baltimore
Silver medal – second place	1986 Toronto
Silver medal – second place	1990 Perth
Bronze medal – third place	1994 Manchester
Silver medal – second place	1998 Baltimore
Silver medal – second place	2002 Perth
Gold medal – first place	2006 London (Canada)
Silver medal – second place	2010 Manchester
Gold medal – first place	2014 Commerce City
Silver medal – second place	2018 Netanya
Silver medal – second place	2023 San Diego
Pan-American Lacrosse Championship
Gold medal – first place	2026 Kingston

The Canadian men's national lacrosse team represents Canada in men's international lacrosse competitions. The team is governed by the Canadian Lacrosse Association, which is a member of World Lacrosse, the international governing body for lacrosse. Traditionally Canada has been one of the leading nations in international play, placing among the top three at the World Lacrosse Championship every year since the tournament's inaugural year in 1967. Canada has a long-standing rivalry with the United States national lacrosse team as they both frequently find themselves facing off against each other.

The team is primarily made up of professional players who compete in Premier Lacrosse League. However, many players also play in the National Lacrosse League and are members of Canada national indoor lacrosse team.

Past Team Canada squads have included lacrosse greats such as Gary Gait, Paul Gait and Tom Marechek.

== Competition achievements ==
=== Olympic Games ===
Canada had two representatives during the 1904 Summer Olympics which included a club team from Winnipeg, Manitoba and another team made up of players from the Mohawk nation.

Games	Representative	Finish	Ref.
1904 St. Louis	Winnipeg Shamrock Lacrosse Team	Gold	
1904 St. Louis	Mohawk Indians	Bronze	
1908 London	National team	Gold	

=== World Championships ===
Year	Location	Result
1967	Toronto, Canada	Bronze
1974	Melbourne, Australia	Silver
1978	Stockport, England	Gold
1982	Baltimore, United States	Bronze
1986	Toronto, Canada	Silver
1990	Perth, Australia	Silver
1994	Manchester, England	Bronze
1998	Baltimore, USA	Silver
2002	Perth, Australia	Silver
2006	London, Canada	Gold
2010	Manchester, England	Silver
2014	Commerce City, USA	Gold
2018	Netanya, Israel	Silver
2023	San Diego, USA	Silver

== Rosters ==
=== 2023 World Lacrosse Championship ===
The final 23 man roster was announced on June 9, 2023. On June 20, Owen Grant pulled out with an injury and was replaced by Michael Grace.

Player	Position	Hometown	Minor association	College	Graduation year	PLL team	NLL team
Wes Berg	Midfield	Coquitlam, BC	Coquitlam Minor Lacrosse (BCLA)	Denver	2015	Redwoods LC	San Diego Seals
Josh Byrne	Attack	New Westminster, BC	New Westminster Lacrosse (BCLA)	Hofstra	2017	Chaos LC	Buffalo Bandits
Zach Currier	Midfield	Peterborough, ON	Peterborough Lakers (OLA)	Princeton	2017	Waterdogs LC	Calgary Roughnecks
Curtis Dickson	Attack	Port Coquitlam, BC	Port Coquitlam Saints (BCLA)	Delaware	2010		San Diego Seals
Brett Dobson	Goalie	Oshawa, ON	Whitby Minor Lacrosse (OLA)	St. Bonaventure	2022	Archers LC	Georgia Swarm
Connor Fields	Attack	East Amherst, NY, USA	Fort Erie Hawks (OLA)	Albany	2018	Archers LC	Rochester Knighthawks
Michael Grace	Defense	Hamilton, ON	Burlington Chiefs (OLA)	RIT	2024		
Owen Grant*	Defense	Newmarket, ON	Newmarket Redbirds (OLA)	Delaware	2023	Redwoods LC	Vancouver Warriors (draft rights)
Latrell Harris	SSDM	St. Catharine's, ON	St. Catharine's Athletics (OLA)			Archers LC	Toronto Rock
Graeme Hossack	Defense	Port Perry, ON	Whitby Minor Lacrosse (OLA)	Lindenwood	2015	Archers LC	Halifax Thunderbirds
Justin Inacio	Face-off	Oakville, ON	Oakville Hawks (OLA)	Ohio State	2022	Archers LC	Calgary Roughnecks
Ryan Lee	Attack	Sharon, ON	Newmarket Redbirds (OLA)	RIT	2017	Redwoods LC	Colorado Mammoth
Brodie Merrill	Defense	Orangeville, ON	Orangeville Northmen (OLA)	Georgetown	2005	Cannons LC	San Diego Seals
Clarke Petterson	Midfield	Toronto, ON	Mimico Lacrosse (OLA)	Cornell	2019	Atlas LC	Halifax Thunderbirds
Ryland Rees	Defense	Port Coquitlam, BC	Port Coquitlam Saints (BCLA)	Stony Brook	2019	Waterdogs LC	Rochester Knighthawks
Challen Rogers	Midfield	Coquitlam, BC	Coquitlam Minor Lacrosse (BCLA)	Stony Brook	2016	Archers LC	Toronto Rock
Patrick Shoemay	Defense	Surrey, BC	Semiahmoo Rock (BCLA)	RIT	2021	Archers LC	San Diego Seals
Dhane Smith	Midfield	Kitchener, ON	Kitchener Minor Lacrosse (OLA)			Chaos LC	Buffalo Bandits
Jeff Teat	Attack	Brampton, ON	Brampton Minor Lacrosse (OLA)	Cornell	2021	Atlas LC	New York Riptide
Dillon Ward	Goalie	Orangeville, ON	Orangeville Minor Lacrosse (OLA)	Bellarmine	2013	Waterdogs LC	Colorado Mammoth
Dyson Williams	Midfield	Oshawa, ON	Whitby Minor Lacrosse (OLA)	Duke	2023		
Casey Wilson	SSDM	Victoria, BC	DeFuca Whalers (BCLA)	Denver	2025		
Jake Withers	Face-off	Peterborough, ON	Peterborough Minor Lacrosse (OLA)	Ohio State	2017	Waterdogs LC	Halifax Thunderbirds
Cameron Wyers	Defense	Ottawa, ON	Nepean Knights Lacrosse Association (OLA)	Loyola	2023	Archers LC	Buffalo Bandits (draft rights)

=== 2018 World Lacrosse Championship ===
Player	Hometown	College	Graduation year	MLL team	NLL team
Tyson Bell	St. Catharines, ON	Onondaga Community College	2015	Atlanta Blaze	Calgary Roughnecks
Wesley Berg	Coquitlam, BC	University of Denver	2015	Denver Outlaws	Calgary Roughnecks
Joshua Byrne	New Westminster, BC	Hofstra University	2017	Chaos LC	Buffalo Bandits
Mark Cockerton	Oshawa, ON	University of Virginia	2014	Ohio Machine	New England Black Wolves
Kevin Crowley	New Westminster, BC	Stony Brook University	2011	Charlotte Hounds	New England Black Wolves
Zach Currier	Peterborough, ON	Princeton University	2017	Denver Outlaws	Calgary Roughnecks
Curtis Dickson	Port Coquitlam, BC	University of Delaware	2010	New York Lizards	Calgary Roughnecks
Brennan Donville	Oakville, ON	Cornell University	2016		
Matt Gilray	Oshawa, ON	Bucknell University	2018		
Latrell Harris	St. Catharines, ON	Brock University	2021		Toronto Rock
Graeme Hossack	Port Perry, ON	Lindenwood University	2015	Atlanta Blaze	Rochester Knighthawks
Tre Leclaire	Surrey, BC	Ohio State University	2020		
Ian MacKay	Port Elgin, ON	University of Vermont	2018		
Mark Matthews	Oshawa, ON	University of Denver	2012	Atlanta Blaze	Saskatchewan Rush
Ben McIntosh	Coquitlam, BC	Drexel University	2014		Saskatchewan Rush
Brodie Merrill	Orangeville, ON	Georgetown University	2005	Boston Cannons	Toronto Rock
Jason Noble	Orangeville, ON	Cornell University	2013	Chesapeake Bayhawks	Georgia Swarm
Jeremy Noble	Orangeville, ON	University of Denver	2014	Atlanta Blaze	Colorado Mammoth
Ryland Rees	Port Coquitlam, BC	Stony Brook University	2019		
Geoff Snider	Calgary, AB	University of Denver	2006		
Jeff Teat	Brampton, ON	Cornell University	2020		
Dillon Ward	Orangeville, ON	Bellarmine University	2013	Denver Outlaws	Colorado Mammoth
Jake Withers	Peterborough, ON	Ohio State University	2017	Atlanta Blaze	Rochester Knighthawks

=== 2014 World Lacrosse Championship ===
==== Starting attack in first game versus US (10 July 2014) ====
Name	Previous nat'l team	College	MLL*	NLL**	Note
Wesley Berg		Denver '15	NA	NA	In college, on the 2012 Under 19 Canada team
Curtis Dickson		Delaware '10	Denver Outlaws	Calgary Roughnecks	Started in 10 of 15 games in his freshman year at Delaware in 2007 when team lost in final four to Hopkins, 2011 NLL Rookie of the Year
Mark Matthews		Denver '11	Rochester Rattlers	Edmonton Rush	

* MLL = Major League Lacrosse, outdoor/field lacrosse, season from April to August, roster as of July 2014
**NLL = National Lacrosse League, indoor lacrosse, season from December to April, roster as of July 2014

==== Starting defense in first game versus US (10 July 2014) ====
Name	Previous nat'l team	College	MLL	NLL	Note
Brodie Merrill	2006, 2010	Georgetown '05	Boston Cannons	Philadelphia Wings	MLL Defenseman of the Year for six straight seasons (2006–11), head coach of The Hill Academy Men's Lacrosse team, 1st team All-American in 2004 and 2005, head coach of the 2012 Canada U19 Men's team
Dillon Roy		Denver '10	Denver Outlaws		
Kyle Rubisch		Dowling '10		Edmonton Rush	1st team DII All-American in 2010

==== Remaining roster ====
Name	Previous nat'l team	College	MLL	NLL	Note
Dan Coates, D		Canisius '11		Colorado Mammoth	
Kevin Crowley, M		Stony Brook '11	Florida Launch	Philadelphia Wings	First overall pick in both MLL and NLL drafts in 2011, 1st team All-American in 2010 and 2011
Angus Dineley, G	2010	Canisius '06	Rochester	Philadelphia Wings	
Brendan Donville, G		Cornell '16	NA	NA	On the 2012 Under 19 Canada team
David Earl, M		Notre Dame '11		Minnesota Swarm	1st team All-American in 2011
Cameron Flint, M/A		Denver '13	Denver Outlaws	Minnesota Swarm	1st team All-American in 2013
Jesse Gamble, A		Cornell '11			
Zack Greer, A	2010	Duke '08/Bryant '09	Denver Outlaws	Edmonton Rush	1st team All-American in 2007 and 2008
Jordan Hall	2010	Delaware '07	Florida Launch	Philadelphia Wings	
Cameron Holding, M		Grand Valley State (GSVU) '08, '09; Florida Southern '10, GSVU '11	Denver Outlaws	Colorado Mammouth	
Adam Jones, M		Canisius '11		Colorado Mammouth	
Jesse King, M		Ohio State '15	NA	NA	On the 2012 Under 19 Canada team, named to U-19 All-World Team after 2012 tournament
Jordan MacIntosh		Rochester Institute of Technology '11	Rochester Rattlers	Minnesota Swarm	PG lacrosse head coach at The Hill Academy
Jason Noble, D		Cornell '13	Florida Launch	Minnesota Swarm	Went to The Hill Academy, 1st team All-American in 2013, twin brother of Jeremy, PG lacrosse assistant coach at The Hill Academy
Jeremy Noble, M		Denver '14	Denver Outlaws	NA (in college)	Went to The Hill Academy, twin brother of Jason
Geoff Snider, Faceoff	2010	Denver '06	Charlotte Hounds	Calgary Roughnecks	On the Canada national team in 2006 and 2010, faceoff coach of the 2012 Canada U19 Men's team
Matt Vinc, G	2010	Canisius '05		Rochester Knighthawks	Lacrosse coach at Dennis Morris Catholic High School in St. Catharines, Canada
Dillon Ward, G		Bellarmine '13		Colorado Mammouth	Would win MVP of 2014 World Championships

==== 2014 coaches ====
Head coach Randy Mearns: head coach of Canisius College for 17 years
Assistant coach Matt Brown: offensive coordinator at the University of Denver.

=== 2010 World Lacrosse Championship ===
Roster for the 2010 World Lacrosse Championship.

Pos.	No.	Player	Team
G	1	Angus Dineley	(United States) New York Titans
G	30	Evan Kirk	(United States) Hobart College Statesmen
D	24	Brodie Merrill	(Canada) Toronto Nationals
D	6	Curtis Manning	(Canada) New Westminster Salmonbellies
D	2	Matt Vinc	(Canada) Toronto Nationals
D	2	Phillip Sanderson	(Canada) Toronto Nationals
D	5	Jon Sullivan	(Canada) Toronto Nationals
M	7	Billy Dee Smith	(United States) Buffalo Bandits
M	10	Simon Lysyk	(Canada) Toronto Nationals
M	25	Geoff Snider	(Canada) Toronto Nationals
M	14	Jordan Hall	(Canada) Toronto Nationals
M	11	Mac Allen	(United States) Rochester Knighthawks
M	9	Rhys Duch	(United States) Washington Stealth
M	23	Ryan McClelland	(United States) Colgate University
M	12	Shawn Williams	(Canada) Toronto Nationals
M	18	Patrick Merrill	(Canada) Toronto Nationals
A	11	Kevin Huntley	(United States) Washington Bayhawks
A	15	Mark Steenhuis	(Canada) Toronto Nationals
A	18	Zack Greer	(United States) Long Island Lizards
A	11	Garrett Billings	(Canada) Toronto Nationals
A	15	John Grant, Jr.	(Canada) Toronto Nationals
A	15	Corey Small	(Canada) Toronto Nationals
