= Neal Powless =

Canadian lacrosse player

Neal Powless (born October 27, 1974) is a Haudenosaunee lacrosse player from the Eel Clan of the Onondaga people near Syracuse, New York. A member of the Onondaga Nation, he is the son of Chief Irving Powless Jr. and brother to Barry Powless and Bradley Powless.

Powless earned a bachelor’s degree in psychology at Nazareth College and a master’s degree in counseling at Syracuse University in 2008. He is a Ph.D. candidate at Syracuse's S.I. Newhouse School of Public Communications. He has served as the University ombuds at Syracuse University since 2019.

== Playing career ==
He was a three-time All-American in field lacrosse at Nazareth College. Powless also played on the Iroquois Nationals at the World Lacrosse Championships in 1994, 1998, 2002 and 2006. He has also played for several professional box lacrosse teams, including the Six Nations Chiefs of the Ontario Lacrosse Association. He played on the Rochester Knighthawks of the Major Indoor Lacrosse League in 1997, when they won their first title.

== Coaching career ==
Powless continues to be involved in the game through coaching box lacrosse teams as well as traveling across the United States doing field lacrosse camps.

Powless has been coaching the Dutch Box Lacrosse program since their first European Championships in 2017. At the 2019 World Lacrosse Men's Indoor World Championship, the Dutch placed 8th (ranked 17th coming in).

== Honors ==
Powless has been inducted into the Nazareth College Sports Hall of Fame (2009), the US Lacrosse, CNY Chapter Hall of Fame (2017), the North American Indigenous Athletics Hall of Fame (NAIAHF, 2022), and the American Indian Athletic Hall of Fame (2025).

He was a producer for lacrosse movie Crooked Arrows.
