= 1986 World Lacrosse Championship =

Tournament details
- Host country: Canada
- Venue(s): Toronto, Ontario
- Dates: July 18–25
- Teams: 4

Final positions
- Champions: United States (4th title)
- Runners-up: Canada
- Third place: Australia
- Fourth place: England

The 1986 World Lacrosse Championship was the fifth World Lacrosse Championship and was played in Toronto, Canada, from July 18–25, 1986. The United States defeated Canada 18-9 in the final to win the tournament.

== Results ==
Team 1	Team 2	Score
Canada	England	15-12
United States	Canada	21-11
England	Australia	11-17
United States	Australia	18-12
United States	England	32-8
Canada	Australia	17-14

== Standings ==
Pos	Team	Pld	W	D	L	Pts
1	United States	3	3	0	0	6
2	Canada	3	2	0	1	4
3	Australia	3	1	0	2	2
4	England	3	0	0	3	0

== Third Place ==
Australia 22, England 6

== Final ==
United States 18, Canada 9

== Final standings ==
Rank	Team
1st place, gold medalist(s)	United States
2nd place, silver medalist(s)	Canada
3rd place, bronze medalist(s)	Australia
4	England

== Awards ==
=== All World Team ===
The International Lacrosse Federation named an All World Team at the conclusion of the championship, along with four other individual awards.

Goalkeeper

(United States) Larry Quinn

Defence

(United States) Jim Burke
(Canada) Jim Atchison
(United States) Bob Vencak

Midfield

(Canada) Kevin Alexander
(England) Mark Hodkin
(Australia) Jeff Kennedy
(United States) John Tucker

Attack

(United States) Roddy Marino
(Australia) Peter Cann
(Canada) Jim Weller

=== Best Positional Players ===
(United States) Larry Quinn - Goalkeeper
(United States) Jim Burke - Defence
(Canada) Kevin Alexander - Midfield
(United States) Roddy Marino - Attack

=== Tournament MVP ===
(Australia) Peter Cann - Attack
