= United States men's national lacrosse team =

National field lacrosse team of the United States

United States
- Association: USA Lacrosse
- Confederation: Pan-American Lacrosse Association
- Head coach: John Danowski

World Championship
- Appearances: 14 (first in 1967)
- Best result: Gold: (1967, 1974, 1982, 1986, 1990, 1994, 1998, 2002, 2010, 2018, 2023)
- Website: teamusa.uslacrosse.org/us-men
Medal record
Olympic Games
Silver medal – second place	1904 St. Louis	Team
World Championship
Gold medal – first place	1967 Toronto
Gold medal – first place	1974 Melbourne
Gold medal – first place	1982 Baltimore
Gold medal – first place	1986 Toronto
Gold medal – first place	1990 Perth
Gold medal – first place	1994 Greater Manchester
Gold medal – first place	1998 Baltimore
Gold medal – first place	2002 Perth
Gold medal – first place	2010 Manchester
Gold medal – first place	2018 Netanya
Gold medal – first place	2023 San Diego
Silver medal – second place	1978 Stockport
Silver medal – second place	2006 London
Silver medal – second place	2014 Denver
Pan-American Championship
Silver medal – second place	2026 Kingston

The United States men's national lacrosse team has won eleven of fourteen World Championship, the most recent in 2023. Team USA finished second in the other three field lacrosse tournaments, losing to Canada in 1978, 2006, and 2014.

The team is organized by US Lacrosse, the national governing body. The roster usually consists of lacrosse players who play in the Premier Lacrosse League.

== Competition achievements ==
=== Olympic Games ===
Olympic Games record
Year	Result	Matches	Wins	Draws	Losses	PF	PA	Coach
(United States) 1904	Silver medal	2	0	1	1	4	10	
(United Kingdom) 1908	Did not participate							
(Netherlands) 1928	Demonstration	2	1	0	1	12	10	
(United States) 1932	Demonstration	3	2	0	1	16	12	
(United Kingdom) 1948	Demonstration	1	0	1	0	5	5	
Total	1/5	8	3	2	3	37	37	—

=== World Championship ===
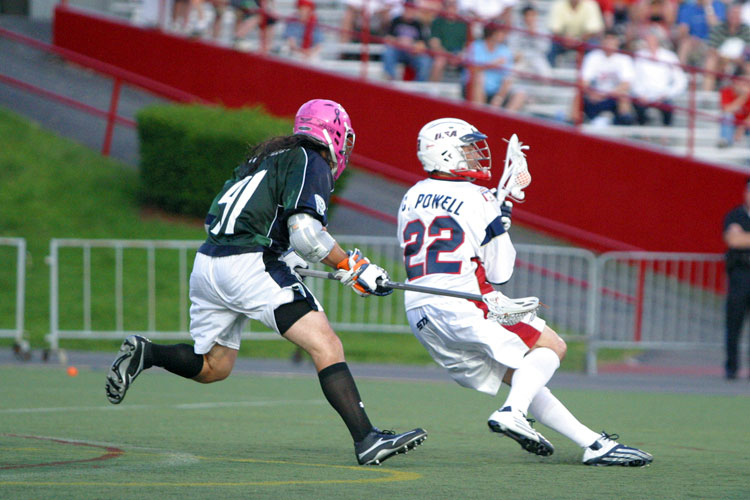
Team USA vs. MLL All-Stars in 2006.

World Lacrosse Men's Championship record
Year	Result	Matches	Wins	Draws	Losses	PF	PA	Coach
(Canada) 1967	Champions	3	3	0	0	58	21	
(Australia) 1974	Champions	3	3	0	0	70	39	
(England) 1978	Runners-up	4	3	0	1	78	49	
(United States) 1982	Champions	4	4	0	0	94	45	
(Canada) 1986	Champions	4	4	0	0	89	40	
(Australia) 1990	Champions	5	5	0	0	112	56	
(England) 1994	Champions	7	7	0	0	150	44	
(United States) 1998	Champions	6	6	0	0	102	56	
(Australia) 2002	Champions	6	6	0	0	115	48	
(Canada) 2006	Runners-up	7	6	0	1	123	65	
(England) 2010	Champions	7	6	0	1	120	44	
(United States) 2014	Runners-up	7	6	0	1	112	34	
(Israel) 2018	Champions	7	7	0	0	107	37	
(United States) 2023	Champions	7	7	0	0	86	28	
(Japan) 2027	Qualified							
Total	14/15	77	73	0	4	1416	606	—

=== Pan-American Championship ===
Pan-American Men's Lacrosse Championship record
Year	Result	Matches	Wins	Draws	Losses	PF	PA	Coach
(Jamaica) 2026	Runners-up	4	3	0	1	76	18	Seth Tierney
Total	1/1	4	3	0	1	76	18	—

== 2010 team ==
=== Attackmen ===
Name	College	Previous US rosters	Note
Ryan Boyle	Princeton 2004	2002, 2006	Played in 2014 MLL season with Boston. Withdrew from 2014 USA tryout pool.
Ned Crotty	Duke 2010		
Mike Leveille	Syracuse 2008		Sat out the 2011, 2012 and 2014 MLL seasons due to full-time job at NBC
Brendan Mundorf	UMBC 2008		
Ryan Powell	Syracuse 2000	2006	2010 US team captain, runs Rhino Lacrosse in Portland, Oregon
Drew Westervelt	USMB 2008		In MLL All-Star game in 2014 versus the US national team, on practice roster for 2014 US team

=== Midfielders ===
Name	College	Previous US rosters	Note
Kevin Cassese	Duke 2003	2002, 2006	Lehigh lax coach, assistant coach of 2014 US nat'l team
Kyle Dixon	Virginia 2006		
Stephen Peyser	Johns Hopkins 2008		
Paul Rabil	Johns Hopkins 2008		
Chris Schiller	Penn State 1999		
Max Seibald	Cornell 2009		
Alex Smith	Delaware 2007		
Matt Striebel	Princeton 2001	2002, 2006	
Matt Zash	Duke 2006		

=== Defense ===
Name	College	Previous US rosters	Note
Joe Cinosky	Maryland 2009		Assistant lacrosse coach at Mount St. Mary's, volunteer assistant lax coach at Duke in 2013
DJ Driscoll	Notre Dame 2006		
Eric Martin	Salisbury 2004		
Ryan McClay	Cornell 2003	2002	
Shawn Nadelen	Johns Hopkins 2001		Lax head coach at Towson
Kyle Sweeney (LSM)	Georgetown 2003	2006	In MLL All-Star game in 2014 versus the US national team, on practice roster for 2014 US team

=== Goalkeepers ===
Name	College	Previous US rosters
Brian Dougherty	Maryland 1996	1998
Adam Fullerton	Army 2008	

== 2014 team ==
US Lacrosse finalized its 23-man roster on June 30, 2014, by cutting eight players that were on the roster for the Team USA versus MLL All Star game on June 26, 2014.

=== Starting attack ===
Name	College	Previous US rosters	2014 MLL team	Note
Ned Crotty	Duke 2010	2010	New York	Won NCAA championship in 2010, 2010 Tewaaraton Trophy winner, 1st team All-American in 2009 and 2010
Brendan Mundorf	UMBC 2006	2010	Chesapeake	Played for Australia in the 2006 World Lacrosse Championship, 2012 MLL MVP
Rob Pannell	Cornell 2013		New York	Won Tewaaraton in 2013, will run attack from behind the cage

=== Other attackmen ===
Name	College	Previous US rosters	2014 MLL team	Note
Marcus Holman	UNC 2013		Ohio	1st team All-American in 2013
Kevin Leveille	Massachusetts 2003		Rochester	His younger brother Mike Leveille (Syracuse 2008) was on the 2010 team, alternate on 2010 team
Garrett Thul	Army 2013		Florida	

=== Starting midfield ===
Name	College	Previous US rosters	2014 MLL team	Note
Kevin Buchanan	Ohio State 2008		Boston	
Paul Rabil	Johns Hopkins 2008	2010	Boston	Won NCAA championship in 2005 and 2007; 1st team All-American in 2006, 2007 and 2008
Max Seibald	Cornell 2009	2010	New York	Won Tewaaraton in 2009

=== Other midfielders ===
Name	College	Previous US rosters	2014 MLL team	Note
Matt Abbott	Syracuse 2009		Chesapeake	Won two NCAA championship (2008 and 2009), 1st team All-American in 2009, his father and grandfather played lax at Syracuse, assistant coach with his brother Mike at Colgate, second on USA team with four groundballs in win versus MLL All Starts in on June 26, 2014
Dan Burns	Maryland 2011		Chesapeake	Walk-on in college
Kyle Harrison	Johns Hopkins 2005	2006	Ohio	Won NCAA championship in 2005, won Tewaaraton in 2005
David Lawson	Duke 2013		Rochester	Won NCAA championship in 2010 and 2013, 1st team All-American in 2013

=== Faceoff ===
Name	College	Previous US rosters	2014 MLL team	Note
Chris Eck	Colgate '08		Boston	won 60% of faceoffs in 2014 MLL season
Greg Gurenlian	Penn State '06		New York	

=== Starting defense ===
Name	College	Previous US rosters	2014 MLL team	Note
Tucker Durkin	Johns Hopkins 2013		Chesapeake	1st team All-American in 2012 and 2013
Michael Evans	Johns Hopkins 2009		Chesapeake	Won NCAA championship in 2007, 1st team All-American in 2009
Lee Zink	Maryland 2004		Denver Outlaws	MLL Defensive Player of the Year in 2012 and 2013, 1st team All-American in 2004, alternate on 2010 team

=== Other defensemen ===
Name	College	Previous US rosters	2014 MLL team	Note
Mitch Belisle (D/LSM/SSDM)	Cornell 2007		Boston	1st team All-American in 2007, plays with both a short- and long-stick in the MLL
Jesse Bernhardt (D/LSM)	Maryland 2013		Chesapeake	1st team All-American in 2013, led USA team with six groundballs versus MLL All Star team on June 26, 2014
Kyle Hartzell (D/LSM)	Salisbury 2007		New York	

=== Goalkeepers ===
Name	College	Previous US rosters	2014 MLL team	Note
Drew Adams	Penn State 2009		New York	Played behind 2010 goalie Brian Dougherty as a rookie
Jesse Schwartzman	Johns Hopkins 2007		Denver	Won NCAA championship in 2005 and 2007

== 2018 team ==
US Lacrosse announced the final 23-man roster for the 2018 World Lacrosse Championship on January 7, 2018.

Number	Name	Position	MLL Team	College	Graduation Year
9	Trevor Baptiste	FO	Boston Cannons	University of Denver	2018
12	Jake Bernhardt	SSDM	Ohio Machine	University of Maryland	2012
36	Jesse Bernhardt	D	Chesapeake Bayhawks	University of Maryland	2015
4	Ryan Brown	A	Charlotte Hounds	Johns Hopkins University	2016
22	Ned Crotty	A/M	Dallas Rattlers	Duke University	2010
40	Matt Danowski	A/M	Chesapeake Bayhawks	Duke University	2008
7	Steve DeNapoli	SSDM	New York Lizards	Hofstra University	2011
51	Tucker Durkin	D	Florida Launch	Johns Hopkins University	2013
28	Michael Ehrhardt	LSM	Charlotte Hounds	University of Maryland	2014
17	Joe Fletcher	D	New York Lizards	Loyola University Maryland	2014
15	John Galloway	G	Dallas Rattlers	Syracuse University	2011
32	Greg Gurenlian	FO	New York Lizards	Penn State University	2006
81	Kyle Hartzell	LSM	New York Lizards	Salisbury University	2008
26	John Haus	M	Charlotte Hounds	University of Maryland	2013
6	Will Haus	M	Charlotte Hounds	Duke University	2015
1	Marcus Holman	A	Ohio Machine	University of North Carolina	2013
91	Jack Kelly	G	Denver Outlaws	Brown University	2016
3	Rob Pannell	A	New York Lizards	Cornell University	2013
99	Paul Rabil	M	New York Lizards	Johns Hopkins University	2008
13	Tom Schreiber	M	Ohio Machine	Princeton University	2014
23	Drew Snider	M	Denver Outlaws	University of Maryland	2012
33	Kevin Unterstein	SSDM	New York Lizards	Hofstra University	2008
11	Joel White	LSM	Dallas Rattlers	Syracuse University	2011
31	Jordan Wolf	A	Dallas Rattlers	Duke University	2014

== 2023 team ==
US Lacrosse announced their 23 man roster for the 2023 World Lacrosse Championship on December 20, 2022. Captains were announced on June 19, 2023.

Name	Position	PLL Team	NLL Team	College	Graduation Year
Trevor Baptiste	FO	Atlas	Philadelphia Wings	Denver	2018
Jesse Bernhardt (C)	D	Chrome	N/A	Maryland	2013
Charlie Bertrand	A/M	Redwoods	Las Vegas Desert Dogs	Merrimack/Virginia	2020/2021
Liam Byrnes	LSM	Waterdogs	Panther City	Marquette	2016
Ryan Conrad	M	Waterdogs	N/A	Virginia	2019
Matthew Dunn	D	Whipsnakes	N/A	Maryland	2016
Michael Ehrhardt (C)	LSM	Whipsnakes	N/A	Maryland	2014
JT Giles-Harris	D	Chrome	N/A	Duke	2021
Zach Goodrich	SSDM	Cannons	N/A	Towson	2019
TD Ierlan	FO	Redwoods	Toronto Rock	Yale/Denver	2020/2021
Connor Kelly	M	Waterdogs	Albany FireWolves	Maryland	2018
Jack Kelly	G	Redwoods	N/A	Brown	2016
Danny Logan	SSDM	Atlas	San Diego Seals	Denver	2021
Kieran McArdle	A	Waterdogs	Albany FireWolves	St. John's	2014
Brennan O'Neill	A/M	N/A	N/A	Duke	2024
Rob Pannell	A	Redwoods	N/A	Cornell	2013
Matt Rambo	A	Whipsnakes	Philadelphia Wings	Maryland	2017
Jacob Richard	SSDM	Atlas	N/A	Marquette	2016
Blaze Riorden	G	Chaos	Philadelphia Wings	Albany	2016
Jack Rowlett	D	Chaos	N/A	North Carolina	2019
Tom Schreiber (C)	M	Archers	Toronto Rock	Princeton	2014
Michael Sowers	A/M	Waterdogs	N/A	Princeton/Duke	2020/2021
Ryan Terefenko	SSDM	Chrome	Halifax Thunderbirds	Ohio State	2021

== 2026 team ==
US Lacrosse announced their 22 man roster for the 2026 Pan-American Lacrosse Championship on August 5, 2026.

Name	Position	College	Graduation year	PLL Team
Kyle Bergen	SSDM	Notre Dame	2028	
Kenny Brower	Defense	Duke	2024	Philadelphia Waterdogs
Xander Dickson	Attack	Virginia	2023	New York Atlas
Will Donovan	Defense	Notre Dame	2026	Boston Cannons
Jackson Eicher	Attack	Army	2025	Carolina Chaos
Blake Eiland	SSDM	Ohio State	2026	Maryland Whipsnakes
Hugh Kelleher	Midfield	Cornell	2025	New York Atlas
Brian Kelly	Attack	St. John's	2025	Boston Cannons
Colin Kirst	Goalie	Rutgers	2022	Boston Cannons
AJ Larkin	Defense	Maryland	2026	
Eric Law	Attack	Denver	2013	
Shawn Lyght	Defense	Notre Dame	2027	
Aidan Maguire	SSDM	Duke	2026	Utah Archers
Andrew McMeekin	Faceoff	Princeton	2026	Boston Cannons
Anderson Moore	Goalie	Georgetown	2027	
Evan Plunkett	Midfield	Army	2026	Denver Outlaws
Jack Posey	Defense	Penn State	2025	Maryland Whipsnakes
Ben Ramsey	SSDM	Notre Dame	2025	Boston Cannons
Ryan Tierney	Attack	Hofstra	2021	
Mikey Weisshaar	Midfield	Towson	2026	Boston Cannons
Luke Wierman	Faceoff	Maryland	2024	Denver Outlaws
Josh Yago	Midfield	Air Force/Notre Dame	2025/2026	Philadelphia Waterdogs

== Four-time national team members ==
Player	Position	College	US rosters
John DeTommaso	Defense	Johns Hopkins	1986, 1990, 1994, 1998
Vinnie Sombrotto	Midfield	Hofstra	1982, 1986,

== Three-time national team members ==
Players are listed in alphabetical order by last name.

Player	Position	College	US rosters
Jesse Bernhardt	Defense	Maryland	2014, 2018, 2023
Ryan Boyle	Attack	Princeton	2002, 2006, 2010
Jim Burke	Defense	Cortland	1982, 1986, 1990
Kevin Cassese	Midfield	Duke	2002, 2006, 2010
Zack Colburn	Defense	Pennsylvania	1990, 1994, 1998
Ned Crotty	Attack	Duke	2010, 2014, 2018
Jim Darcangelo	Midfield	Towson	1978, 1982, 1986
Norm Engelke	Midfield	Cornell	1982, 1986, 1990
Sal LoCascio	Goalie	Massachusetts	1990, 1994, 1998
Rob Pannell	Attack	Cornell	2014, 2018, 2023
Larry Quinn	Goalie	Johns Hopkins	1986, 1990, 1994
Paul Rabil	Midfield	Johns Hopkins	2010, 2014, 2018
Matt Striebel	Midfield	Princeton	2002, 2006, 2010

== See also ==
- World Lacrosse Championship
- United States national indoor lacrosse team
- United States men's national lacrosse sixes team
