= 1990 World Lacrosse Championship =

Tournament details
- Host country: Australia
- Venue(s): WACA Ground, Perth
- Dates: July 7–15
- Teams: 5

Final positions
- Champions: United States (5th title)
- Runners-up: Canada
- Third place: Australia
- Fourth place: England

The 1990 World Lacrosse Championship was the sixth World Lacrosse Championship and was played at the WACA Ground in Perth, Western Australia, from July 7–15, 1990. The United States defeated Canada 19-15 in the final to win the tournament. The Iroquois Nationals became the fifth team to participate in the tournament.

== Results ==
Date	Team 1	Team 2	Score
July 7	United States	Australia	21-9
July 7	Canada	Iroquois Nationals	18-15
July 8	United States	Iroquois Nationals	26-10
July 8	Canada	England	30-14
July 9	United States	Canada	25-14
July 9	England	Australia	7-24
Jul 11	United States	England	21-8
Jul 11	Australia	Iroquois Nationals	23-7
Jul 12	Australia	Canada	17-26
Jul 12	England	Iroquois Nationals	15-12

== Standings ==
Pos	Team	Pld	W	D	L	Pts
1	United States	4	4	0	0	8
2	Canada	4	3	0	1	6
3	Australia	4	2	0	2	4
4	England	4	1	0	3	2
5	Haudenosaunee	4	0	0	4	0

== Third Place ==
Australia 16, England 6

== Final ==
United States 19, Canada 15

== Final standings ==
Rank	Team
1st place, gold medalist(s)	United States
2nd place, silver medalist(s)	Canada
3rd place, bronze medalist(s)	Australia
4	England
5	Haudenosaunee

== Awards ==
=== All World Team ===
The International Lacrosse Federation named an All World Team at the conclusion of the championship, along with four other individual awards.

Goalkeeper

(Australia) Murray Keen

Defence

(United States) Dave Pietramala
(Canada) Ben Hieltjes
(United States) Steve Mitchell

Midfield

(United States) Brad Kotz
(Canada) Gary Gait
(United States) John Tucker

Attack

(United States) Mac Ford
(United States) Roddy Marino
(Canada) Bill Marachek

=== Best Positional Players ===
(Australia) Murray Keen - Goalkeeper
(United States) Dave Pietramala - Defence
(United States) Brad Kotz - Midfield
(United States) Mac Ford - Attack

=== Tournament MVP ===
(United States) Dave Pietramala - Defence
