= Australia men's national lacrosse team =

Australia
- Nickname(s): Sharks
- Association: Lacrosse Australia
- Confederation: Asia Pacific Lacrosse Union
- Head coach: Glenn Morley
- Captain: Nigel Morton, Christopher Plumb and Alex Brown

World Championship
- Appearances: 14 (first in 1967)
- Best result: Runners-up (1967, 1974, 1982, 1994)
Medal record
World Lacrosse Championship
Silver medal – second place	1967 Toronto
Silver medal – second place	1974 Melbourne
Bronze medal – third place	1978 Stockport
Silver medal – second place	1982 Baltimore
Bronze medal – third place	1986 Toronto
Bronze medal – third place	1990 Perth
Silver medal – second place	1994 Manchester
Bronze medal – third place	1998 Baltimore
Bronze medal – third place	2002 Perth
Bronze medal – third place	2006 London
Bronze medal – third place	2010 Manchester

The Australia men's national lacrosse team, nicknamed the Sharks, is governed by Lacrosse Australia.

In the World Lacrosse Men's Championship, Australia won silver or bronze every tournament between 1967 and 2010. In 2014, the Sharks finished fourth for the first time. They went on to finish fourth in 2018 and 2023.

== Squad ==
2023 Australia men's lacrosse team
Name	Position	Club
Sean Aaron	Goalkeeper	Camberwell
Mitchell Baker	Attack	Malvern/Rutgers
Isaac Cahill	Attack	Subiaco
Ashby Dennis	Defence	Subiaco
Matthew Fuss	Midfield	Brighton
Callan Gibson	Attack	Williamstown/Coker
Thomas Graham	Midfield	Bayswater/Norway
Tim Graham	Faceoff	Malvern/Cornell
Joshua Harris	Defence	Burnside
Matthew Heuston	Midfield	Loyola
Donnie Howard	Midfield	Boston University
Campbell MacKinnon	Midfield	Altona
Connor McDonough	Attack	Towson
Jeff Melsop	Defence	Footscray
Chris Moffatt	Defence	Eltham
Brayden Panting	Midfield	Wembley
Lucas Parsons Quintiao	MIdfield	Footscray
Lachlan Russell	Defence	Williamstown
Cameron Semmler	Defence	Burnside
Ryan Spark	Goalkeeper	East Fremantle
Jackson Stock	Faceoff	Brighton
Lachlan Walker	Midfield	Wanneroo Joondalup
Matthew Wood	Midfield	Wembley
Jaesaya Bidwell-Barton	Alternate	Subiaco
Sean Clarke	Alternate	Williamstown
Patrick Palmer	Alternate	Glenelg
Jack Price	Alternate	Glenelg

Australia senior men's national lacrosse team 2018
Number	Name		Club	State
16	Sean	AARON	Camberwell	Vic
48	Brock	BEALL	East Fremantle	WA
9	Stuart	BENTLEY	Wembley	WA
11	Alexander	BROWN	Wembley	WA
8	Isaac	CAHILL	Subiaco	WA
7	Matthew	FUSS	Brighton	SA
6	Thomas	GRAHAM	Bayswater	WA
18	Timothy	GRAHAM	Malvern	Vic
21	Andrew	HAM	Surrey Park	Vic
5	Noah	JENNEY	Williamstown	Vic
4	Luke	KEESING	Glenelg	SA
1	Mitchell	KENNEDY	East Fremantle	WA
17	James	LAWERSON	Footscray	Vic
22	Jeffrey	MELSOPP	Footscray	Vic
3	Nigel	MORTON	Glenelg	SA
27	Benjamin	MUXLOW	Wembley	WA
12	Christopher	PLUMB	Footscray	Vic
45	Chris	ROBERTSON	Siena College	NY, USA
10	Callum	ROBINSON	Wembley	WA
2	Ryan	SPARK	East Fremantle	WA
24	Lachlan	WALKER	Wanneroo-Joondalup	WA
alternates
13	Daniel	EVANS	Glenelg	SA
26	Joshua	HARRIS	Burnside	SA
29	Peter	KWAS	Footscray	Vic
Coaches
head	Glenn	MEREDITH		
asst	Rodney	ANSELL		
asst	Glenn	MORLEY		

== World Championship results ==
=== Medal table ===
Gold	Silver	Bronze	Total
0	4	7	11

=== Performance by tournament ===
Team	Appearances	Highest Finish	1967 (Canada) (4)	1974 (Australia) (4)	1978 (England) (4)	1982 (United States) (4)	1986 (Canada) (4)	1990 (Australia) (5)	1994 (England) (6)	1998 (United States) (11)	2002 (Australia) (15)	2006 (Canada) (21)	2010 (England) (29)	2014 (United States) (38)	2018 (Israel) (46)	2023 (United States) (30)	2027 (Japan) TBD
Australia	14	2nd	2nd	2nd	3rd	2nd	3rd	3rd	2nd	3rd	3rd	3rd	3rd	4th	4th	4th	

Legend
1st	Champions
2nd	Runners-up
3rd	Third Place
•	Did not qualify
••	Withdrew
	Hosts
–	Did not enter

== See also ==
- Lacrosse in Australia
- Australia women's national lacrosse team
- Australia national indoor lacrosse team
