= Homewood Field =

Athletics stadium in Baltimore, Maryland

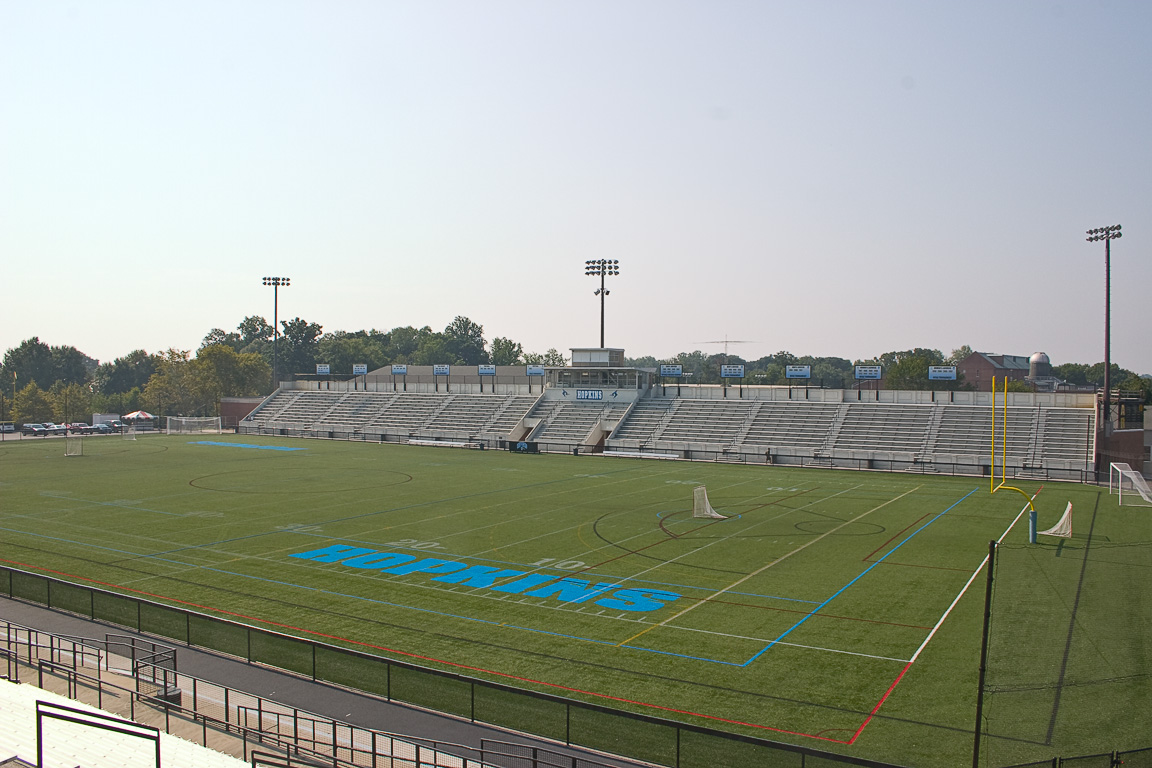
- Interactive map of Homewood Field
- Location: Baltimore, Maryland, U.S.
- Coordinates: 39°20′1″N 76°37′15″W
- Owner: Johns Hopkins University
- Capacity: 8,500
- Surface: Shaw Sports Momentum 51

Construction
- Opened: 1906

Tenants
- Johns Hopkins Blue Jays (NCAA) (1906–present); Baltimore Bayhawks (MLL) (2001 & 2003); Maryland Whipsnakes (PLL) (2024–future)

Homewood Field is the athletics stadium of the Johns Hopkins University in Baltimore, Maryland.

== History ==
It was built in 1906 and has an official capacity of 8,500 people. The name is taken, as is that of the entire campus, from the name of the estate of Charles Carroll of Carrollton. Homewood Field is located on the northern border of the campus. It serves as the home field for the university's football, soccer, field hockey, and lacrosse teams.

It was also the home field for the professional lacrosse team, the Baltimore Bayhawks, for the 2001 and 2003 Major League Lacrosse seasons. It hosted the Division I NCAA Men's Lacrosse Championship in 1975, and was the site for the 2016 Big Ten men's lacrosse tournament. The south grandstand is named for Conrad Gebelein (1884–1981), longtime music director at the university.

While known primarily for being the "Yankee Stadium of Lacrosse", its largest record crowd actually filled the stands for a football game. In 1915 on Thanksgiving Day, 13,000 spectators watched Hopkins grind out a 3–0 win over in-state rival Maryland. Fletcher Watts scored the game-winning field goal as the last moments ticked down. From then until 1934, the teams met on that day all but two years.
