= World Lacrosse Championship =

World Lacrosse Championship may refer to:

- World Lacrosse Men's Championship
- World Lacrosse Women's Championship
