= List of Australian Lacrosse best and fairest players =

Men's best and fairest:

- 1956-1960: Brady Award
- 1961-1962: ALC Trophy
- 1963–present: O C Isaachsen Trophy

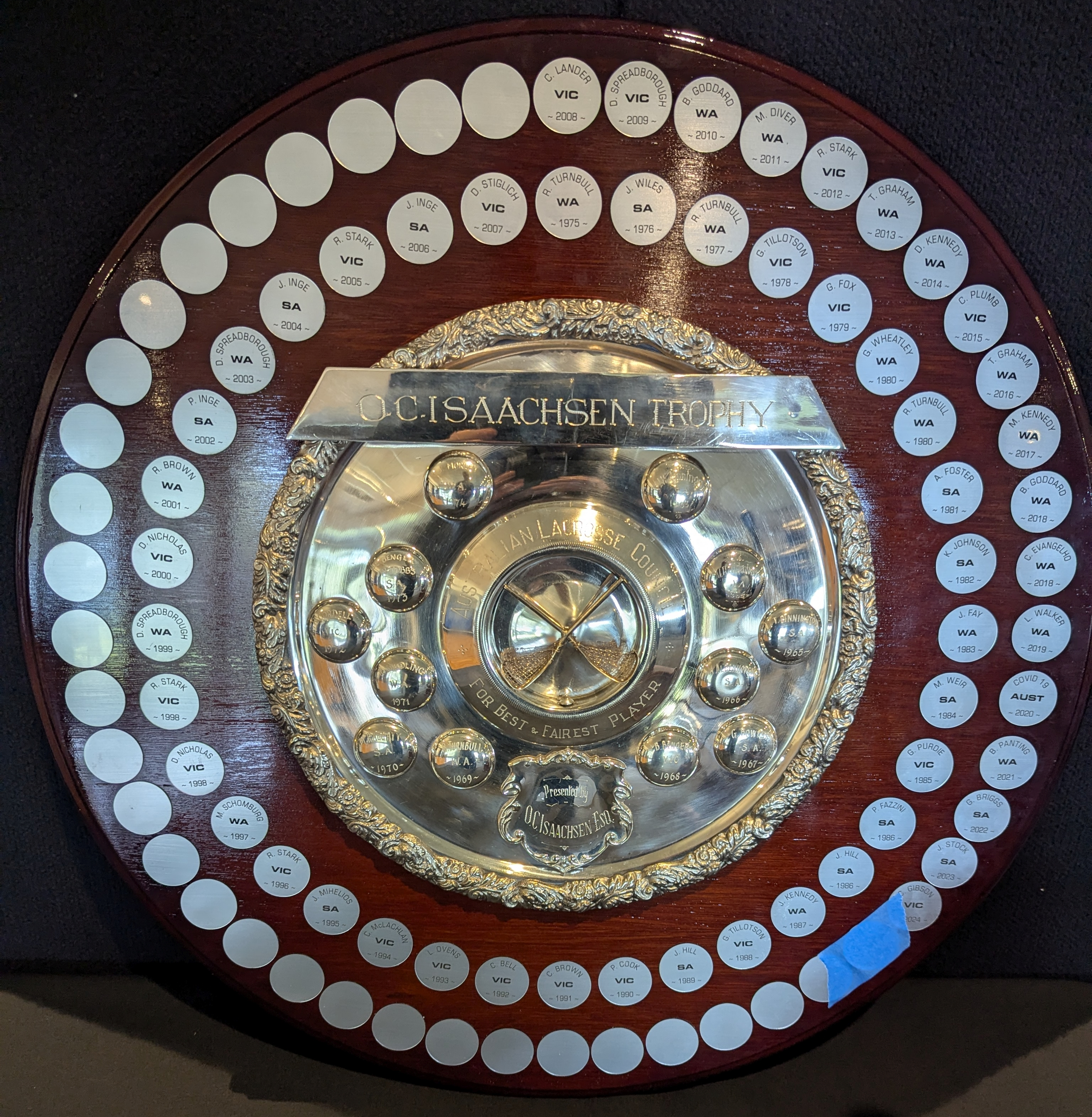
The O C Isaachsen Trophy

The Isaachsen Trophy is awarded to the best player in Australia competing in state domestic club competitions. The trophy was donated by Cedric Isaachsen to the Australian Lacrosse Council (ALC) in 1963. Isaachsen had a distinguished military career, rising to the rank of lieutenant colonel and earning the honour of Companion of the Distinguished Service Order (DSO), followed by a distinguished legal career. He was the president of ALC (1962-65), then vice-president for 14 years until 1979. He was elected as a fellow of the ALC in 1994. He lived in South Australia and died in 2009, aged 97 years.

Women's best and fairest (2012–present): Shelley Maher Trophy

The trophy is named in honour of Shelley Maher and was instituted in 2012 by the ALA. As the last President of Women’s Lacrosse Australia (2001-2009) In her home state of Victoria Shelley was President of Women’s Lacrosse Victoria (1998-2001), and was elected a Life Member in 2001, and in 2009 of Women’s Lacrosse Australia. She was active as a player with Williamstown Women’s Lacrosse Club and represented Victoria in senior competition (2002, 2005). Shelley was an ALA Director (2007-2010) and now resides in the USA where she remains active in lacrosse as the Women’s Director on the Federation of International Lacrosse.

Votes are cast by referees in the highest-level competition in each State and are 'evened out' to allow for a different number of games played in various States.

Year	Men		Women	
Year	Winner	Club (State)	Winner	Club (State)
1956	Allan H Gandy	North Adelaide (SA)	not awarded	
1957	Roy Dickson	Surrey Park (Vic)	not awarded	
1958	Robert E Wakelin	Sturt (SA)	not awarded	
1959	Ralph W Turner	Port Adelaide (SA)	not awarded	
1960	Graham S Reid	Coburg (Vic)	not awarded	
1961	H Donald Miller	Caulfield (Vic)	not awarded	
1962	Allan W Jennings	Sturt (SA)	not awarded	
1963	Allan W Jennings	Sturt (SA)	not awarded	
1964	Michael R Aldenhoven	Brighton (SA)	not awarded	
1965	Thomas Pinnington	Glenelg (SA)	not awarded	
1966	Brian J Griffin	Nedlands-Subiaco (WA)	not awarded	
1967	Glenn M Bowyer	Woodville (SA)	not awarded	
1968	Barry E Benger	Malvern (Vic)	not awarded	
1969	Ross S Turnbull	Nedlands-Subiaco (WA)	not awarded	
1970	Michael Raggatt	Brighton (SA)	not awarded	
1971	Rod Swadling	Bayswater (WA)	not awarded	
1972	Rod Cordell	Williamstown (Vic)	not awarded	
1973	Barry E Benger	Burnside (SA)	not awarded	
1973	Warren E Hobbs	University (SA)	not awarded	
1974	Lloyd Morley	Bayswater (WA)	not awarded	
1975	Ross S Turnbull	Nedlands-Subiaco (WA)	not awarded	
1976	Jim Wiles	Sturt (SA)	not awarded	
1977	Ross S Turnbull	Nedlands-Subiaco (WA)	not awarded	
1978	Gary Tillotson	Surrey Park (Vic)	not awarded	
1979	Graeme Fox	Surrey Park (Vic)	not awarded	
1980	Ross S Turnbull	Nedlands-Subiaco (WA)	not awarded	
1980	Greg Wheatley	South Perth (WA)	not awarded	
1981	Albert (Jay) Foster*	Burnside (SA)	not awarded	
1982	Klay Johnson*	Glenelg (SA)	not awarded	
1983	John Fay*	East Fremantle (WA)	not awarded	
1984	Maurice Weir	North Adelaide (SA)	not awarded	
1985	Gordon Purdie	Chadstone (Vic)	not awarded	
1986	Paul Fazzini*	Sturt (SA)	not awarded	
1986	John Hill	Sturt (SA)	not awarded	
1987	Jeff Kennedy	East Fremantle (WA)	not awarded	
1988	Gary Tillotson	Surrey Park (Vic)	not awarded	
1989	John Hill	Sturt (SA)	not awarded	
1990	Paul Cook	Malvern (Vic)	not awarded	
1991	Chris Brown	Caulfield (Vic)	not awarded	
1992	Craig Bell	Eltham (Vic)	not awarded	
1993	Lindsay Ovens	Footscray (Vic)	not awarded	
1994	Cameron McLachlan	Surrey Park (Vic)	not awarded	
1995	Jim Mihelios	West Torrens (SA)	not awarded	
1996	Rob Stark	Caulfield (Vic)	not awarded	
1997	Matt Schomburg	East Fremantle (WA)	not awarded	
1998	Darren Nicholas	Eltham (Vic)	not awarded	
1998	Rob Stark	Caulfield (Vic)	not awarded	
1999	David Spreadborough	Subiaco (WA)	not awarded	
2000	Darren Nicholas	Eltham (Vic)	not awarded	
2001	Russell Brown	Bayswater (WA)	not awarded	
2002	Peter Inge	Woodville (SA)	not awarded	
2003	David Spreadborough	Subiaco (WA)	not awarded	
2004	James Inge	Woodville (SA)	not awarded	
2005	Rob Stark	Caulfield (Vic)	not awarded	
2006	James Inge	Woodville (SA)	not awarded	
2007	Daniel Stiglich	Eltham (Vic)	not awarded	
2008	Clinton Lander	Camberwell (Vic)	not awarded	
2009	David Spreadborough	Surrey Park (Vic)	not awarded	
2010	Brad Goddard	East Fremantle (WA)	not awarded	
2011	Matthew Diver	Wembley (WA)	not awarded	
2012	Rob Stark	Caulfield (Vic)	Rachel Kirchheimer	Newport (Vic)
2012	Rob Stark	Caulfield (Vic)	Beth Varga	Brighton (SA)
2013	Thomas Graham	Bayswater (WA)	Jessica Kennedy	East Fremantle (WA)
2014	Daniel Kennedy	East Fremantle (WA)	Lyndsey Paton	Newport (Vic)
2015	Christopher Plumb	Footscray (Vic)	Karen Morton	Glenelg (SA)
2016	Thomas Graham	Bayswater (WA)	Marlee Paton	Newport (Vic)
2016	Thomas Graham	Bayswater (WA)	Beth Varga	Brighton (SA)
2017	Mitchell Kennedy	East Fremantle (WA)	Courtney Hobbs	Glenelg (SA)
2018	Cameron Evangelho*	East Fremantle (WA)	Rachel Kirchheimer	Newport (Vic)
2018	Brad Goddard	Wembley (WA)	Rachel Kirchheimer	Newport (Vic)
2019	Lachlan Walker	Wanneroo-Joondalup (WA)	Madison Copeland	East Fremantle (WA)
2020	not awarded – COVID-19 pandemic			
2021	Brayden Panting	Wembley (WA)	Olivia Parker	Blue Warriors (SA)
2022	Garrette Briggs*	North Eagles (SA)	Rebecca Lane	Footscray (Vic)
2023	Jackson Stock	Brighton (SA)	Stephanie Kelly	Footscray (Vic)
2024	Callan Gibson	Williamstown (Vic)	Stephanie Kelly	Footscray (Vic)
2025	Lachlan Walker	Wanneroo-Joondalup (WA)	Marlee Wood	Newport (Vic)

* Players from the United States

== See also ==
- Lacrosse in Australia
