= Woodville Lacrosse Club =

- Nicknames: Warriors
- Sport: Lacrosse
- Founded: 24 February 1899
- League: Lacrosse SA
- Based in: Adelaide
- Arena: Findon Oval
- Colours
- Championships: 1904, 1931, 1932, 1949, 1955, 1958, 1959, 1998, 1999, 2000, 2001, 2002, 2005, 2007, 2008
- Website: www.warriorslax.com

The Woodville Lacrosse Club was founded in 1899 and is located in the north western suburbs of Adelaide.

In 1903, the name of the club was changed to Port Adelaide, by which it was known until 1966, until becoming once again known as Woodville.

== Premierships ==
As Port Adelaide, the Club had early success in 1904, finishing the season ahead of Sturt, who were the dominant club in South Australia at the time. Port Adelaide had additional success in 1931 and 1932, before having a golden era in the 1950s, featuring in 10 of 12 grand finals and winning four of them. There was a 39-year drought before success returned to the Club, this time as Woodville, with 8 premierships in 11 years including five in a row from 1998 to 2002.

A Grade Premierships:

- 1904, 1931, 1932, 1949, 1955, 1958, 1959, 1998, 1999, 2000, 2001, 2002, 2005, 2007, 2008

== National Awards ==
Australian Lacrosse Hall of Fame

- 2025 – Peter Inge

Australian Lacrosse Council (now Lacrosse Australia) Fellows Award:

- 1995 – Kenneth Forrest

O C Isaachsen Trophy winners:

- 1967 – Glenn Bowyer
- 2002 – Peter Inge
- 2004, 2006 – James Inge

Shelley Maher Trophy winners:

- 2021 – Olivia Parker

National Carnival Best and Fairest:
Brady Award

- 1959 – Ralph Turner

Hobbs Trophy

- 1998 – Aaron Sargent
- 2005 – Peter Inge
- 2010 – Stefan Guerin

Lacrosse Australia Trophy

- 2022, 2023 – Olivia Parker

Australian Club Champions

- 2008

== Notable players ==
One of Woodville's finest players is Peter Inge, who represented Australia in World Championships in 1998, 2002 and 2006 as well as the national Under 19 team in 1996. At the 2002 World Lacrosse Championship, Inge was named in the All-Star Team. In 2003, Inge became the first Australian and first player without NCAA experience to be drafted to the professional Major League Lacrosse competition in the United States, where he was selected for the Boston Cannons. He played at Boston for three years before spending his fourth and final year in the MLL at the now-defunct San Francisco Dragons.

- Jack Fletcher - Port Adelaide Football Club premiership captain
- Lionel Williams - television personality

== See also ==
- Lacrosse in Australia
- List of South Australian Lacrosse Premiers
- List of the oldest lacrosse teams
