= List of Australian Club Lacrosse national champions =

The first Australian Club Lacrosse Championships were held in Adelaide, South Australia on 7 June 2008 and featured the premiers of the South Australian and Victorian men's and women's state league competitions from the previous year.

In 2009 the tournament was expanded to feature the premiers from the Western Australian league competitions, plus a wildcard entry for the fourth spot, given in the first instance to the previous year's national champion if they did not win their state league, or otherwise the non premiership team with the best home and away record for their league. With four teams in each of the men's and women's championships, semi finals are played to determine who plays in the championship final the following day.

The success of the event in its early years may lead to club national championships to become a permanent and regular fixture on the Australian Lacrosse calendar.

Year	Men		Women		Venue
Year	Champions	Championship Result	Champions	Championship Result	Venue
2008	Woodville	Woodville (SA) 13 – 11 Eltham (Vic)	Newport	Newport (Vic) 20 – 16 Glenelg (SA) (OT)	Adelaide
2009	Williamstown	Williamstown (Vic) 18 – 6 Eltham (Vic)	Brighton	Brighton (SA) 21 – 6 Newport (Vic)	Adelaide
2010	Brighton	Brighton (SA) 14 – 10 Williamstown (Vic)	Brighton	Brighton (SA) 17 – 9 Wembley (WA)	Adelaide
2011	Brighton	Brighton (SA) 10 – 9 Wembley (WA)	not contested		Adelaide
2012	Brighton	Brighton (SA) 12 – 11 Surrey Park (Vic)	Brighton	Brighton (SA) 14 – 11 Newport (Vic)	Adelaide
2012	Brighton	Brighton (SA) 15 – 8 Surrey Park (Vic)	Brighton	Brighton (SA) 12 – 8 Newport (Vic)	Adelaide
2013	Bayswater	Bayswater (WA) 11 – 9 Brighton (SA)	Brighton	Brighton (SA) 18 – 10 Newport (Vic)	Adelaide
2014	not contested				
2015	Bayswater	Bayswater (WA) 11 – 3 Brighton (SA)	not contested		Adelaide

== See also ==
- Lacrosse in Australia
- List of South Australian Lacrosse Premiers
- List of Victorian Lacrosse Premiers
- List of Western Australian Lacrosse Premiers
