= Adelaide University Sport =

- University: University of Adelaide
- Nickname: The Blacks
- Association: UniSport; EAEN; UBL
- President: David Penn
- Athletic director: Michelle Wilson
- Location: Adelaide, Australia
- Varsity teams: 37 sports teams
- Colours: Black White
- Mascot: Gus the Black Lion
- Website: adelaideunisport.com.au

Adelaide University Sport is the sports association of the University of Adelaide. Established in 1896, it had 37 sports clubs, including some that predate its establishment. Other bodies affiliated to the University of Adelaide providing sport include the various sports clubs forming part of the residential colleges and the Roseworthy Agricultural Campus Student Union Council.

== History ==
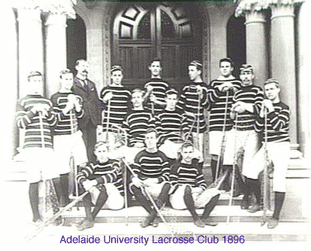
Adelaide University Lacrosse Club 1896 premiership team

The Adelaide University Sports Association was founded in 1896 by the Adelaide University Boat, Tennis and Lacrosse Clubs. Its historical motto in Latin is Mobilitate Vigemus translated "we thrive by mobility". Its sporting colours black and white are likely from the white-backed magpie, an Australian bird found on its crest and the state badge. Its mascot is Gus, a black lion, which replaced the piping shrike on its historical crest. The sports association was administered by the Adelaide University Union for over 100 years before becoming directly affiliated with the university in 2010. The sports association re-named to Adelaide University Sport that same year.

== Founding sporting clubs ==
=== Adelaide University Boat Club ===
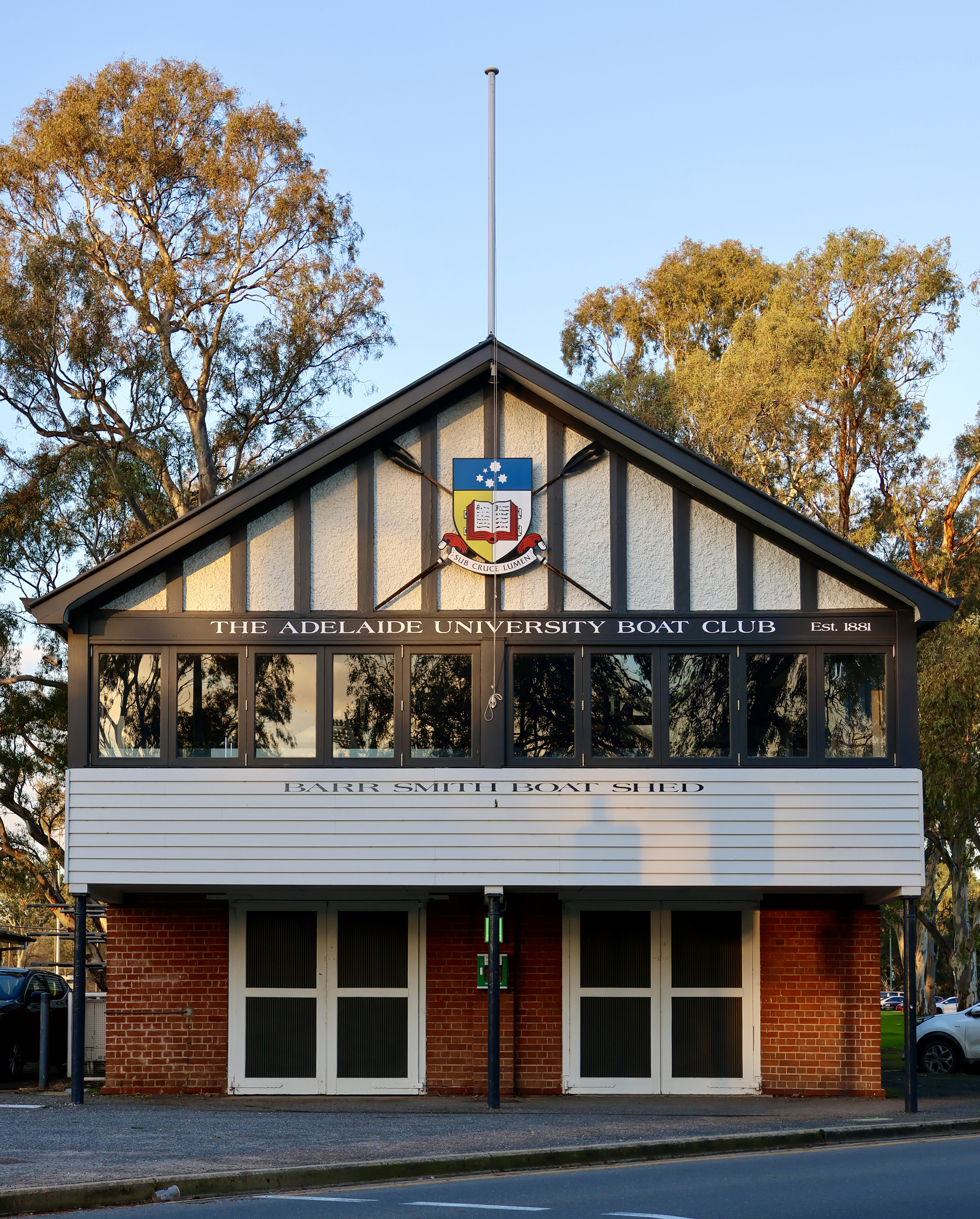
The boat shed of the Adelaide University Boat Club was donated by Robert Barr Smith

The Adelaide University Boat Club was founded in 1881 and is one of South Australia's premier rowing clubs. The club claims to be the second-oldest in Australia, though this claim is disputed with the Sydney University Boat Club who uses the founding date of the Sydney Rowing Club. It is a member club of Rowing SA (South Australian Rowing Association) and operates from the Torrens River in the Adelaide city centre, and from West Lakes in the suburb of West Lakes. The city boathouse was donated by Robert Barr Smith in 1909. The West Lakes Boathouse is shared with the other South Australian rowing clubs and is administered by Rowing SA.

The main focus of the club is to provide rowing for the students of the University of Adelaide. Each year the club competes in the Rowing Intervarsity and local and national regattas. The premier event is the Oxford and Cambridge Cup (a silver cup similar in style to the America's Cup) for Men's Eights. The cup was donated by Old Blues of the Universities of Oxford and Cambridge in the 1890s.

Olympians that were former members include Australia's first gold medalist in rowing Collier Cudmore, Kate Slatter (Women's Pair Gold and Silver medallist), Jaime Fernandez (Men's Eight Silver), Tim Willoughby (Men's Eight Bronze) and Amber Halliday (Lightweight).

=== Adelaide University Tennis Club ===
The Adelaide University Tennis Club was founded in 1885 and is a lawn tennis club. It was instrumental in the founding of the Adelaide University Sports Association. Dr Albert Curtis came to Adelaide in 1903 having been at the University of Sydney. He had won the 1896 Queensland Doubles Champion and the 1897 NSW Singles Championship. In 1905 he was runner-up in the singles final of the inaugural Australian Open and graduated in medicine.

=== Adelaide University Lacrosse Club ===
The Adelaide University Lacrosse Club was founded in 1889 by Nobel Prize winning Professor William Henry Bragg. It is one of the oldest lacrosse clubs in Australia and is a founding member of the AUSA. The AULC takes part in an annual competition against the Melbourne University Lacrosse Club that was first contested in 1905 and competes locally in the Lacrosse South Australia competition. Club membership is focused on University of Adelaide students and graduates. Other non students are also members. The club trains on the University of Adelaide's Park 10 sports fields in the parklands between the University campus and North Adelaide.

Seven Rhodes Scholars have been members:

- 1909 Henry Fry, anthropologist and medical practitioner.
- 1917 Sir Hugh William Bell Cairns, neurosurgeon.
- 1925 Myles Landseer Formby, World War II surgeon.
- 1939 Duncan Campbell Menzies, army officer. Died after being tortured by the Japanese in Burma whilst on patrol with the Chindits during World War II.
- 1955 Ian Wilson, politician and lawyer.
- 1976 Mark Rogers Mussared, medical practitioner.
- 1983 David Alexander C Robertson

==== University blues ====
A University sporting blue is awarded for excellence in a particular sport. The awarding of a Blue is usually for competing in a state or national team. The AULC has 134 full Blues awarded to members since 1908. Many more half blues and club letters have also been awarded.

==== A Grade Premierships ====
The club has won 11 men's and 1 women's A grade premierships since 1893.

== Other sporting clubs ==
Following the 1895 establishment of the Adelaide University Union, the student association, the three clubs co-founded the Adelaide University Sports Association in 1896. Additional sports clubs such as the Adelaide University Football Club were established throughout the 20th century

=== Adelaide University Gliding Club ===
Adelaide University Gliding Club was formed in 1976, and operates a fleet of gliders that includes a pair of two-seat training aircraft, a motor glider and several single-seat gliders. Launches are provided by a winch. The club shares an airfield at Stonefield in the Riverland with the Barossa Valley Gliding Club and Fly Down Under, a commercial gliding operation. It is heavily involved in flying training, which is carried out in the two-seat sailplanes under the guidance of club instructors and has trained many pilots from ab initio (complete novice) level through to cross-country, national and international (as members of the Australian Gliding Team) competition. Several AUGC pilots have gone on to a career in aviation, as RAAF pilots, commercial helicopter pilots and flying for Qantas. Three club members have received University Blues.

=== Adelaide University Football Club ===
The Adelaide University Football Club was officially formed on 26 March 1906 and became affiliated with the Sports Association two weeks later on 9 April 1906. Prior to this time, there was no University Football team competing in a regular competition; however games were arranged on an irregular basis.

The earliest reference to football at University was found in a PAC School Chronicle of 1885. The report stated that Adelaide University could not organise a full side for a Saturday game; however there were enough available for a mid-week game. This was arranged for Wednesday 19 June 1885 and several League players and old scholars from PAC comprised the side. University lost this encounter 4.11 to 1.1.

The Blacks were successful in winning the A Grade Premiership in the years 1911–12, 1920–22, 1926, 1929, 1932, 1951–52, 1954–55, 1960–62, 1965, 1968–69, 1974–75, 1986, 1996, and 1999. In 2006 the Blacks were runners-up to Goodwood Saints 10.12 72 – 18.11 119.

=== Adelaide University Touch Club ===
Touch Football is a game derived from rugby league, where tackling and kicking are outlawed. The Adelaide University Touch Club was formed in 1983 and joined the Sports Association in 1985. It is the largest touch football club in South Australia. The club has players ranging from complete beginners to players who have represented Australia and England at international tournaments. The club enters teams in the local park touch competition in both single sex grades and mixed grades in both summer and winter competitions. During summer the club runs a mixed competition at the Waite Campus of the University.

=== Adelaide University Athletics Club ===
Established in 1906, the Athletics Club has a participatory focus and competes in events such as the City-Bay Fun Run. Notable past members include Olympian and eight-time Australian champion David Fitzsimons (Blue recipient 1970), as well as scientist Henry Brose (secretary 1910–11, Blue recipient 1910), former Attorney-General of South Australia Trevor Griffin (Half Blue recipient 1962, Club Letter recipient 1959), former Justice of the Supreme Court of South Australia the Honourable Timothy Anderson (Blue recipient 1966), and current Judge of the District Court of South Australia, Peter Brebner (treasurer 1977–80). Since the Club's establishment, forty-seven club members have been awarded a University Blue.

Membership doubled from 27 registered athletes in 1982/83 to 53 in 1983/84, the Club hosted the National Intervarsity Championships in 1983, made the finals in both Men's A and D grades and won the D grade Interclub premiership, the club's first in six years.

=== Adelaide University Sailing Club ===
The oldest university sailing club in Australia, it was established in 1959 and hosted the first intervarsity competitions in 1960 and onward. Always a power of Australian university sailing, it maintains a fleet of boats at the Royal South Australian Yacht Squadron for novices and has many state, national, and international representatives.

=== Adelaide University Rugby Union Football Club ===
(Australia) Adelaide University Rugby Union Football Club
- Union: South Australia Rugby Union
- Founded: 1932
- Ground: Waite Oval
- President: Matt Mooney
Team Strip kit

First match
- AURUFC 15 – 15 Royal Australian Navy Reserve 16 July 1932

Official website
- www.theblacks.com.au/Clubs/Club.aspx?CID=28

The Adelaide University Rugby Union Football Club affectionately known as the ‘Uni Blacks’, is a rugby union club based in Adelaide, South Australia. Established on 14 July 1932, the AURUFC is the oldest rugby union club in South Australia and the only surviving foundation club in the South Australia Rugby Union competition.

The club's home ground is located in the eastern suburbs of Adelaide at Waite Oval and is presently home to three senior men's teams and junior teams from under 7s to under 16s. It is one of many clubs that represent The University of Adelaide and is open to public membership.

== Roseworthy campus ==
Roseworthy Agricultural Campus Student Union Council is an affiliate of the Adelaide University Union. It represents the interests of students at Roseworthy Campus and runs activities including orientation, sports and other social events. Up until the 1980s, sport at Roseworthy was organised by the Roseworthy Agricultural College Sports Union, founded in 1927. Sports included athletics, cricket, football, golf, judo, rifle shooting, rugby union, swimming, table tennis, tennis, and water polo.

== Intercollegiate Sport – High Table Cup ==
There have been two cups awarded for the Intercollegiate Sport championship between Adelaide University Colleges, both with the generic title of High Table Cup. The College Cup was donated by the High Table of St. Mark's College in the 1950s, and remained in use until 1995 when the Douglas Irving Cup was donated. Current participants are the College Clubs of Aquinas College, Flinders University Hall, Lincoln College, St. Ann's College and St Mark's College.

While the majority of participants are from the University of Adelaide, most residential colleges also accept students from other South Australian Universities and technical colleges, who are also able to participate in the competition. There are 11 sports in the championship. They are (in chronological order) tennis, swimming (mixed), basketball, debating (mixed), Australian Rules Football, netball, soccer, table tennis, field hockey, volleyball and athletics (mixed).
