= Brian Griffin (lacrosse) =

Australian lacrosse player (1941–2020)

Personal information
- Nationality: Australia
- Born: 16 April 1941
- Died: 17 June 2020 (aged 79)

Sport
- Position: Attack
Medal record
Men's field lacrosse
Representing Australia
World Championship
| Silver medal – second place | 1967 Canada |
| Silver medal – second place | 1974 Australia |

Brian Griffin (16 April 1941 – 17 June 2020) was an Australian lacrosse player and one of only two lacrosse players to be inducted into the Sport Australia Hall of Fame.

Griffin commenced playing in 1953 for the Nedlands-Subiaco Lacrosse Club in Western Australia, making his A Grade debut in 1957.

An attacker of the highest quality, Griffin first represented Australia in their 1962 overseas tour.

He took out Australia's highest individual honour in winning the OC Isaachsen Trophy as Australia's best and fairest men's lacrosse player in 1966.

Griffin captained the Australian side at the inaugural World Championship in Toronto, Canada, in 1967, and was selected as Australia's most valuable player for the tournament. Being able to throw and catch with both hands was unheard of until then, and he also developed a back-hand shot which made for greater depth in play.

In 1970 he was a member of the Australian team to play against the touring US team and in 1972, toured the US again. American experts described Griffin as the best player in the world, and he was recognised by the US Lacrosse Hall of Fame, Baltimore, following that 1972 tour.

In 1974, he competed in the World Championship in Melbourne and in 1984, was assistant Australian coach for the tournament that was played alongside the 1984 Summer Olympics.

In 1986 Brian was inducted into the Western Australian Hall of Champions and in 1999 was inducted into the Sport Australia Hall of Fame. In 2025 Brian was inducted as part of the inaugural class into the Australian Lacrosse Hall of Fame.
