= War crimes in Manchukuo =

War crimes in Manchukuo were committed during the rule of the Empire of Japan in northeast China, either directly, or through its puppet state of Manchukuo, from 1931 to 1945. Various war crimes took place, but have received comparatively little historical attention.

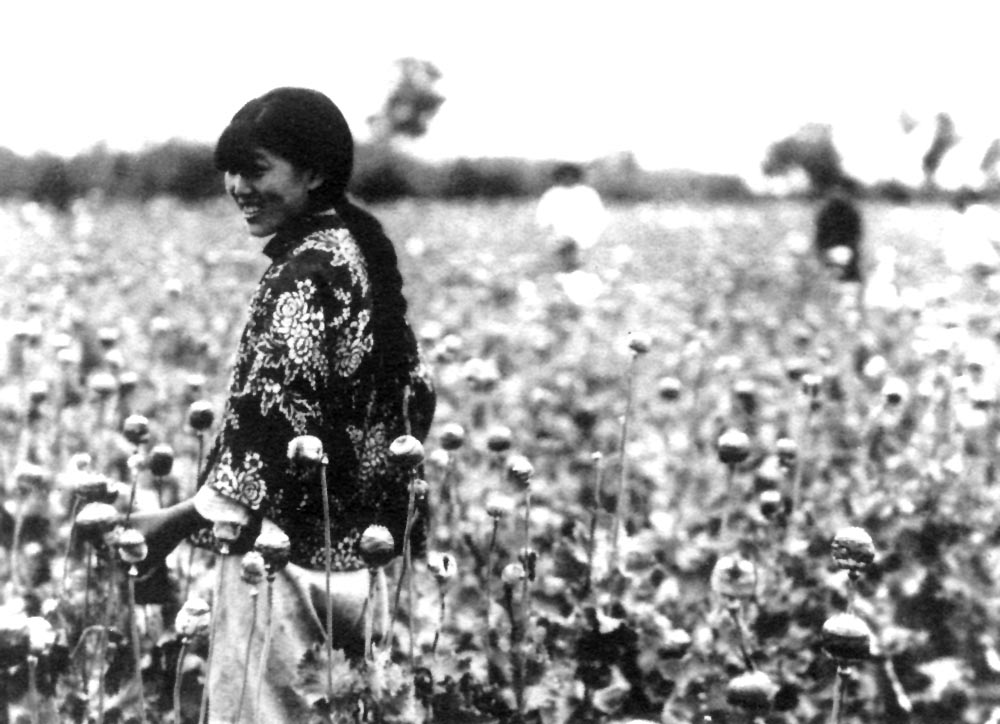
Opium poppy harvest in northern Manchukuo

== Legal basis ==
Although the Empire of Japan did not sign the Geneva Conventions, which have provided the standard definition of war crimes since 1864, the crimes committed fall under other aspects of international and Japanese law. For example, many of the alleged crimes committed by Japanese personnel broke Japanese military law, and were not subject to court martial, as required by that law. Japan also violated signed international agreements, including provisions of the Treaty of Versailles such as a ban on the use of chemical weapons, and the Hague Conventions (1899 and 1907), which protect prisoners of war (POWs). The Japanese government also signed the Kellogg–Briand Pact (1929), thereby rendering its actions in 1937-45 liable to charges of crimes against peace, a charge that was introduced at the Tokyo Trials to prosecute "Class A" war criminals. "Class B" war criminals were those found guilty of war crimes per se, and "Class C" war criminals were those guilty of crimes against humanity. The Japanese government also accepted the terms set by the Potsdam Declaration (1945) after the end of the war. The declaration alluded, in Article 10, to two kinds of war crime: one was the violation of international laws, such as the abuse of prisoners of war; the other was obstructing "democratic tendencies among the Japanese people" and civil liberties within Japan.

In Japan, the term "Japanese war crimes" generally only refers to cases tried by the International Military Tribunal for the Far East, also known as the Tokyo Trials, following the end of the Pacific War. However, the tribunal did not prosecute war crimes allegations involving mid-ranking officers or more junior personnel. Those were dealt with separately in trials held in China and in the Soviet Union after the surrender of Japan.

== War crimes ==
=== Abuse of ethnic minorities ===
The Oroqen suffered a significant population decline under Japanese rule. The Japanese distributed opium among them and subjected some members of the community to human experiments, and combined with incidents of epidemic diseases this caused their population to decline until only 1,000 remained. The Japanese banned Oroqen from communicating with other ethnicities, and forced them to hunt animals for them in exchange for rations and clothing which were sometimes insufficient for survival, which led to deaths from starvation and exposure. Opium was distributed to Oroqen adults older than 18 as a means of control. After 2 Japanese troops were killed in Alihe by an Oroqen hunter, the Japanese poisoned 40 Oroqen to death. The Japanese forced Oroqen to fight for them in the war which led to a population decrease of Oroqen people. Even those Oroqen who avoided direct control by the Japanese found themselves facing conflict from anti-Japanese forces of the Chinese Communists, which contributed to their population decline during this period.

Between 1931 and 1945, the Hezhen population declined by 80% or 90%, due to heavy opium use and deaths from Japanese cruelty, such as slave labor and relocation by the Japanese.

=== Human experimentation ===
Special Japanese military units conducted experiments on civilians and POWs in Manchukuo. One of the most infamous was Unit 731. Victims were subjected to vivisection without anesthesia, and were used to test biological weapons, among other experiments.

Between 3,000 and 12,000 men, women, and children died during human experimentation conducted by Unit 731.

=== Chemical and biological weapons ===
According to historians Yoshiaki Yoshimi and Seiya Matsuno, Emperor Hirohito authorized the use of chemical weapons in China. Furthermore, "tens of thousands, and perhaps as many 200,000, Chinese died of bubonic plague, cholera, anthrax and other diseases", resulting from the use of biological warfare. Although owing to systematic Japanese destruction of records, there is no record of chemical or biological weapons in Manchukuo itself, these weapons of mass destruction were partly researched, produced, and stockpiled in Manchukuo by the Kwantung Army.

=== Forced labor ===
The Japanese military's use of forced labor also caused many deaths. According to a joint study of historians Zhifen Ju, Mitsuyochi Himeta, Toru Kubo and Mark Peattie, more than 10 million Chinese civilians were mobilized for forced labor in Manchukuo under the supervision of the Kōa-in.

Forced laborers were often assigned work in dangerous conditions without adequate safety precautions. The world's deadliest mine disaster, at Benxihu Colliery, occurred in Manchukuo.

=== Human rights violations ===
- Arrest of civilians without due cause by the local Manchukuo police or Japanese authorities.
- Torture of prisoners in regular penal or military jails.
- Disappearances and extrajudicial execution of political opponents.
- Preferential civil rights for Japanese subjects over other nationalities.
- Forced land appropriations either with or without legal orders in favour of Japanese citizens or private and government companies.
- Use of criminal gangs for robbery and intimidation of political opposition

=== Drug trafficking ===
In 2007, an article by Reiji Yoshida in the Japan Times argued that the Japanese investments in Manchukuo were partly financed by selling drugs. According to the article, a document claimed to have been found by Yoshida directly implicated the Kōa-in in providing funds to drug dealers in China for the benefit of the puppet governments of Manchukuo, Nanjing and Mongolia. This document corroborates evidence analyzed earlier by the Tokyo tribunal which stated that

Japan's real purpose in engaging drug traffic was far more sinister than even the debauchery of Chinese people. Japan, having signed and ratified the opium conventions, was bound not to engage in drug traffic, but she found in the alleged but false independence of Manchukuo a convenient opportunity to carry on a worldwide drug traffic and cast the guilt upon that puppet state ... In 1937, it was pointed out in the League of Nations that 90% of all illicit white drugs in the world were of Japanese origin ...

== War crimes trials ==
=== Khabarovsk war crimes trials ===
In late 1949, numerous members of the former Kwantung Army who had been captured in the Soviet invasion of Manchuria were convicted in connection with the activities of Unit 731, and related units for their connections with crimes against humanity and the use of chemical and biological weapons.

=== Tokyo Trials ===
The International Military Tribunal for the Far East convicted a number of high Japanese officials in connection with the invasion of Manchuria, establishment of Manchukuo and with conspiracy to wage aggressive war against China. Those sentenced to death with strong connections to Manchukuo included senior officers in the Kwantung Army Hideki Tōjō, Akira Mutō, Seishirō Itagaki and Kenji Doihara.

== See also ==
- Japanese war crimes
- Definitions of Japanese war crimes
- Responses of Germany and Japan to World War II crimes
- Amleto Vespa
- Japanese settlers in Manchuria
