= Major League Sixes =

Annual lacrosse tournament

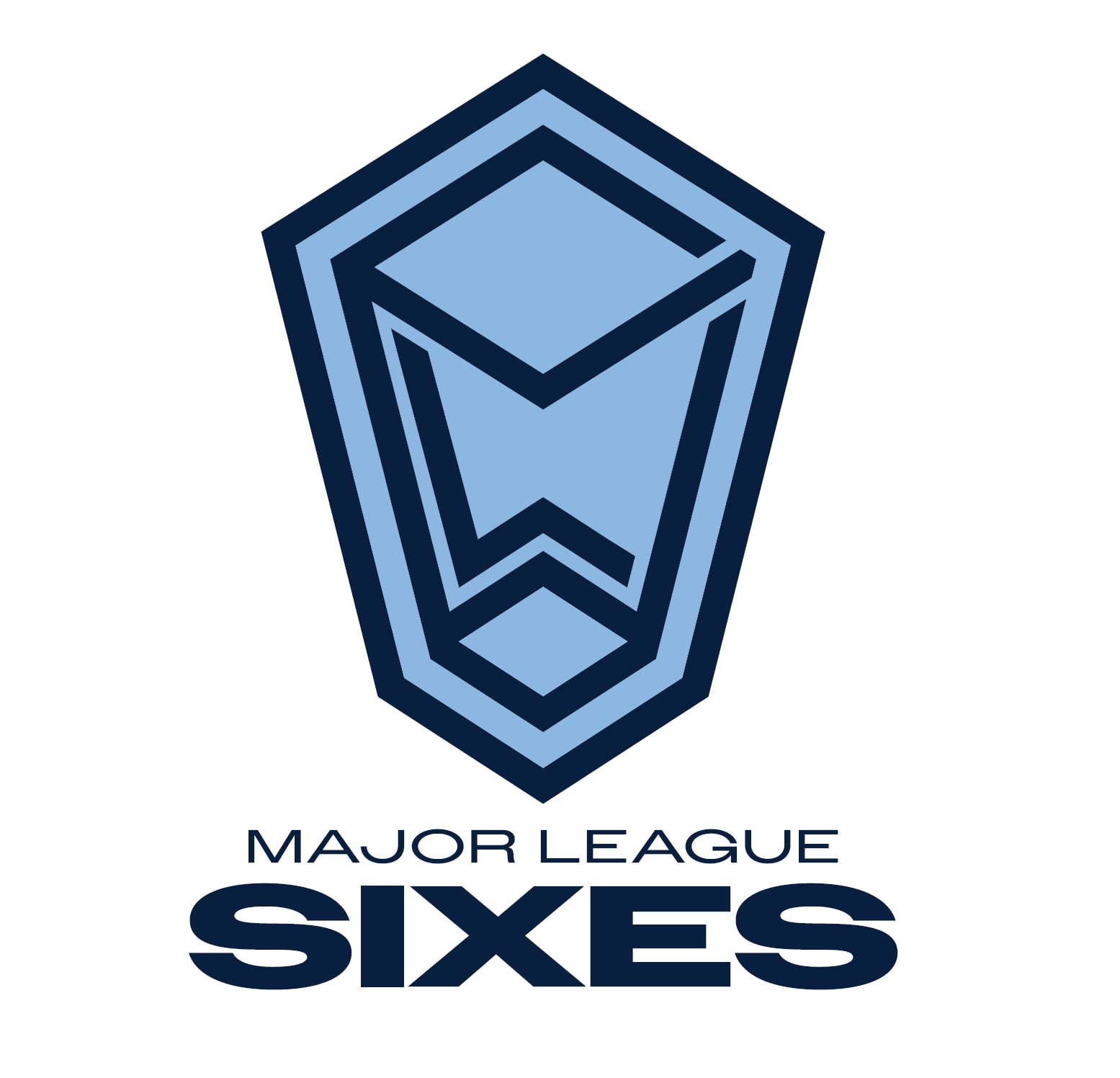
- Sport: Lacrosse Sixes
- First season: 2024
- Organising body: Lacrosse Australia
- Divisions: Women's and Men's
- No. of teams: 5 each
- Country: Australia
- Most recent champions: Brisbane Salties (women); Melbourne Makos (men)
- Website: majorleaguesixes.au

Major League Sixes is an annual elite lacrosse tournament held in Australia, played to lacrosse sixes rules — the format that will be played at the 2028 Summer Olympics — and bringing fast-paced, dynamic lacrosse to the Australian lacrosse community.

Launched in 2024, Major League Sixes marked a major shift for national lacrosse competition in Australia, with a new franchise-based draft format consisting of five even teams for both women's and men's divisions, representing major cities around the country. This was a departure from the traditional state-based representative team format used in national field and box lacrosse championships, which historically have been dominated by the traditional Australian lacrosse heartlands of Victoria, South Australia and Western Australia.

The third edition of the tournament will be played from 19-21 November 2026.

== Lacrosse Sixes and Rule Differences ==
The lacrosse sixes format is a version of lacrosse which aims to provide greater access to lacrosse by eliminating barriers of entry. This format is also designed to be more applicable for the modern Olympic framework..

The typical major changes for Lacrosse Sixes are as follows:

- 6 against 6 rather than 10 against 10
- 30 second shot-clock
- 4x 8-minute quarters
- Goalkeepers begin play when a goal is scored; face-offs only occur at the beginning of each quarter
- Field size is 70 by 36 meters
- Everyone plays on both sides of the field
- No long poles are permitted
- No shot back up — a missed shot results in a change of possession all of the time rather than possession being determined by who is closest to the ball when it goes out

== Franchises ==
Adelaide Redbellies	Brisbane Salties	Melbourne Makos	Perth Manta Rays	Sydney Seahawks
Adelaide Redbellies lacrosse team logo	Brisbane Salties lacrosse team logo	Melbourne Makos lacrosse team logo	Perth Manta Rays lacrosse team logo	Sydney Seahawks lacrosse team logo

== Major League Sixes Champions ==
Season	Women's	Men's
2024	Adelaide Redbellies	Perth Manta Rays
2025	Brisbane Salties	Melbourne Makos

== See also ==
- Lacrosse in Australia
- Lacrosse Australia
- Lacrosse sixes
