= Melbourne University Lacrosse Club =

The Melbourne University Lacrosse Club (MULC) was founded in 1883 and is the oldest extant lacrosse club in Australia and oldest continually existing lacrosse club in the world.

== Premierships ==
Melbourne University won their first men's A Grade premiership three years after formation in 1886 and won eight more until their last A Grade premiership in 1920.

A Grade Premierships:

- 1886, 1887, 1889, 1895, 1897, 1899, 1900, 1915, 1920

== See also ==
- Lacrosse in Australia
- List of Victorian Lacrosse Premiers
- Adelaide University Lacrosse Club
- List of the oldest lacrosse teams
