= North Adelaide Lacrosse Club =

Lacrosse club in South Australia

The North Adelaide Lacrosse Club was founded on 22 March 1887, and is the oldest continually existing lacrosse club in South Australia. Nobel Laureate Sir William Henry Bragg, previously a member of the Adelaide Lacrosse Club, was a founding member of North Adelaide as well as the Adelaide University Lacrosse Club later in 1889. NALC are currently located in the suburb of Gepps Cross.

== Premierships ==
North Adelaide had early success in the South Australian Lacrosse Association, but have not won an A Grade premiership since 1960.

A Grade Premierships:

- 1888, 1889, 1897, 1909, 1910, 1927, 1928, 1929, 1960

North Adelaide also unofficially won the premiership in 1887 before the South Australian Lacrosse Association was formally constituted.

== See also ==
- Lacrosse in Australia
- List of South Australian Lacrosse Premiers
- Adelaide University Lacrosse Club
- List of the oldest lacrosse teams
