= List of Queensland Lacrosse Premiers =

Men's Premiership Trophy: ?

Women's Premiership Trophy: ?

Year	Men			Women		
Year	Premiers		Runners-up	Premiers	Minor Premiers	Grand Final
1903	Iroquois		Indooroopilly	no competition		
1904	Iroquois A		Indooroopilly	no competition		
1905	Buffalo		Indooroopilly	no competition		
1906	Iroquois		Buffalo	no competition		
1915	Past Normal					
Year	Men			Women		
Year	Champions	League Winners	Championship Final	Champions	League Winners	Championship Final
1930	Kalinga	Kalinga	Kalinga 7 – 6 Toombul	no competition		
1931	Toombul	Kalinga	Toombul 13 – 6 Kalinga	no competition		
1932	Yeronga		Yeronga 9 – 3 Kalinga	no competition		
1940	Kalinga		Kalinga 13 – 4 Norman Park	no competition		
1941				no competition		
1942-5	no competition - Second World War			no competition		
1946	Kalinga		Kalinga 8 – 7 Chermside (ET)	no competition		
1947				no competition		
1948	Kalinga		Kalinga 12 – 10 Chermside	no competition		
1949	Kalinga		Kalinga 20 – 10 Chermside	no competition		
1950	Kalinga		Chermside 11 – 13 Kalinga	no competition		
2013	Brisbane	Brisbane	Brisbane 17 – 3 Gold Coast	no competition		
2014	Brisbane	Brisbane	Brisbane 11 – 8 Sunshine Coast			
2015	Brisbane	Brisbane	Brisbane 8 – 6 Sunshine Coast		Brisbane	
2016	Sunshine Coast	Brisbane	Brisbane 9 – 19 Sunshine Coast	University of Queensland	University of Queensland	University of Queensland d Sunshine Coast
2017	Sunshine Coast	Brisbane	Sunshine Coast 15 – 8 Brisbane	University of Queensland	Brisbane	University of Queensland 4 – 3 Brisbane
2018	Brisbane	Brisbane	Brisbane 18 – 9 University of Queensland	University of Queensland	Brisbane	University of Queensland 12 – 6 Brisbane

== State Championships by Club ==
Club	State Champions		League Premiers	
Club	Men's	Women's	Men's	Women's
Brisbane	4	0	6	3
Gold Coast	0	0	0	0
Sunshine Coast	2	0	0	0
University of Queensland	0	3	0	1

== See also ==
- Lacrosse in Australia
