= Australian Lacrosse Hall of Fame =

- Established: 2025
- Chairperson: Graham Hobbs
- Website: www.lacrosse.com.au/australian-lacrosse-hall-of-fame

The Australian Lacrosse Hall of Fame, inaugurated in 2025, has been established to recognise exceptional performances of athletes at World Championships, World Cups, and National carnivals, as well as those individuals who have made outstanding contributions to the growth and development of lacrosse in Australia.

The need for a Hall of Fame to recognise, acknowledge and celebrate the achievements of Australia's finest lacrosse players in its nearly 150-year history had been mooted for several years, with a formal announcement of its institution coming in late 2024.

The inaugural class of Australian Lacrosse Hall of Fame was formally inducted at a ceremony in Adelaide on 14 November 2025, with 14 male and 7 female athletes, including one who was elevated to Legend status.

== List of Hall of Fame inductees ==
Class	Individual	Role
2025	Jen Adams	Player - Modern Era
2025	John Butkiewicz	Player - Modern Era
2025	Peter Cann	Player - Modern Era
2025	Ray Duthy	Player - Modern Era
2025	Doug Fox	Player - Modern Era
2025	Sarah Forbes	Player - Modern Era
2025	Allan Gandy	Player - Hickory Era
2025	Brian Griffin	Player - Modern Era
2025	Don Gorman	Player - Hickory Era
2025	Dudley Hamilton	Player - Hickory Era
2025	Colleen Hunter	Player - Modern Era
2025	Peter Inge	Player - Modern Era
2025	Jeff Kennedy	Player - Modern Era
2025	Murray Keen	Player - Modern Era
2025	Sue McSolvin	Player - Modern Era
2025	Hannah Nielsen	Player - Modern Era
2025	Mary Pickett	Player - Modern Era
2025	Michael Raggatt	Player - Modern Era
2025	Roy Sloggett	Player - Hickory Era
2025	Sue Sofarnos	Player - Modern Era
2025	John Tokarua	Player - Modern Era

== Legends ==
Induction year	Athlete	Legend year
2025	Allan Gandy	2025

== See also ==
- National Lacrosse Hall of Fame (United States)
- Canadian Lacrosse Hall of Fame
- Sport Australia Hall of Fame
- Lacrosse in Australia
