= Lacrosse in Australia =

- Country: Australia
- Governing body: Lacrosse Australia
- National teams: Men's Field; Women's Field; Men's Indoor
- Nickname: Sharks (Men)

National competitions
- Australian Lacrosse National Championships; Major League Sixes

Club competitions
- Australian Club Lacrosse Championships

International competitions
- World Lacrosse Championship; Women's Lacrosse World Cup; World Indoor Lacrosse Championship; Under-19 World Lacrosse Championships

Lacrosse in Australia is a minor sport, with a long and proud history dating back to 1876, with a small but dedicated community of participants and volunteers. The established centres for lacrosse are in the greater metropolitan areas of Melbourne, Adelaide, and Perth. In these cities there are organised weekend field lacrosse competitions for men and women at senior and junior levels, played over the winter months (April until September). In the off-season, there are informal box lacrosse and sofcrosse competitions, though the majority of players in Australia are mostly of the field lacrosse type. Some lacrosse is also played in Sydney, South East Queensland, Canberra, Ballarat and Bendigo, it is very much at the developmental level.

Lacrosse in Australia is now governed by a single governing body, Lacrosse Australia (LA), known until 2021 as the Australian Lacrosse Association, following the merger of Lacrosse Australia and Women's Lacrosse Australia, who had until 2008 governed the men's and women's versions of the games independently. The move to a unified national body was precipitated by the withholding of funds by the Australian federal government.

== History ==
=== Men's lacrosse ===
==== Victoria ====
The pioneer of lacrosse in Victoria (and Australia as a whole) was a Canadian, Lambton L. Mount. He came to the Victorian goldfields as a fourteen-year-old with his family in 1853 but it was not until 1875 that he was moved to revive his early boyhood memories of lacrosse. After watching the football final between Carlton and Melbourne in that year it occurred to him that lacrosse was a superior game.

In April 1876 Mount wrote to the Australasian Newspaper to announce that he was arranging to import forty lacrosse sticks from Canada and intended to start lacrosse and establish the Melbourne Lacrosse Club. He succeeded and the first practice match of this club took place on 22 June 1876 between 15-20 players at Albert Park. The Melbourne club continued to promote the sport and arranged matches between the "Reds" and "Blues" in Albert Park during 1877-78. By 1879, four clubs had been formed with some 120 players. These four clubs Melbourne, Fitzroy, South Melbourne and Carlton formed the Victorian Lacrosse Association in July 1879 for the purpose of coordinating matches. The Governor of Victoria G. A. C. Phipps, was the inaugural Patron.

==== South Australia ====
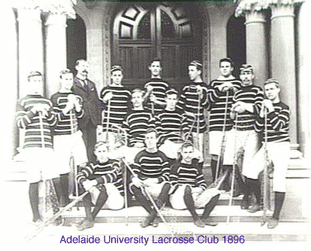
Adelaide University Lacrosse Club, 1896 premiership team

Lacrosse began in South Australia with the formation of the Adelaide Lacrosse Club on Friday, 6 April 1883 at the Prince Alfred Hotel. Practice was held by the club in the South Parklands. By 1887 North Adelaide (who still exist today), Noarlunga and Knightsbridge (located in what is now Leabrook) had joined Adelaide to play regular games in the city, and the South Australian Lacrosse Association (now Lacrosse SA) was formed in 1888. Nobel Prize winning Professor Bragg, a founding member of the North Adelaide club established University in 1889.

Lacrosse soon spread around the fledgling province, and the game grew in popularity in the small city of Adelaide and through the country towns, with large crowds recorded at the race course fixtures. Teams were formed at Port Pirie, Jamestown, Port Augusta, Port Germein, Gawler, Kapunda, Angaston, Riverton and Murray Bridge.

==== Western Australia ====
The introduction of lacrosse into Western Australia was the indirect consequence of gold discoveries in the Eastern Goldfields. Perth was a major gateway to the goldfields as well as Western Australia's commercial hub. The city's population tripled from just 8,447 in 1891 to 27,553 ten years later. C Atkins, the part owner of a sport store in Barrack Street, took the lead in establishing lacrosse in Perth. On 15 May 1896, The Inquirer and Commercial News reported that the sports store had lacrosse sticks for sale, and Atkins made contact with two recently arrived lacrosse players from the eastern states, Fred Parsons and Fred Wingrove. At the meeting held at the United Service Hotel and called at the instigation of Atkins, the lacrosse pioneers Parsons & Wingrove helped form two clubs, Perth and Fremantle, in 1896. Two further clubs, Mercantile (based on a merchandising warehouse) and Cottesloe (later Banks) were formed in 1897. A formal competition commenced in 1898 with Mercantile winning the first premiership in that year.

The first report of lacrosse being played in the Eastern Goldfields was in May 1898 when teams called Kalgoorlie and Mines (whose home was the town of Boulder) met. During 1899, a "Coastal" team visited the Goldfields where local devotee Arthur O'Connor was nurturing the sport – principally from Coolgardie. This exhibition game became a regular feature of the Western Australian sporting calendar until 1914, when a downturn in the gold industry and the outbreak of World War I signalled the end of the Eastern Goldfields Lacrosse Association. After the Great Depression of the early 1930s the Eastern Goldfields Lacrosse Association was re-established in 1935 and existed for another four years when World War II caused men to join up. Later attempts to revive the game after the war failed.

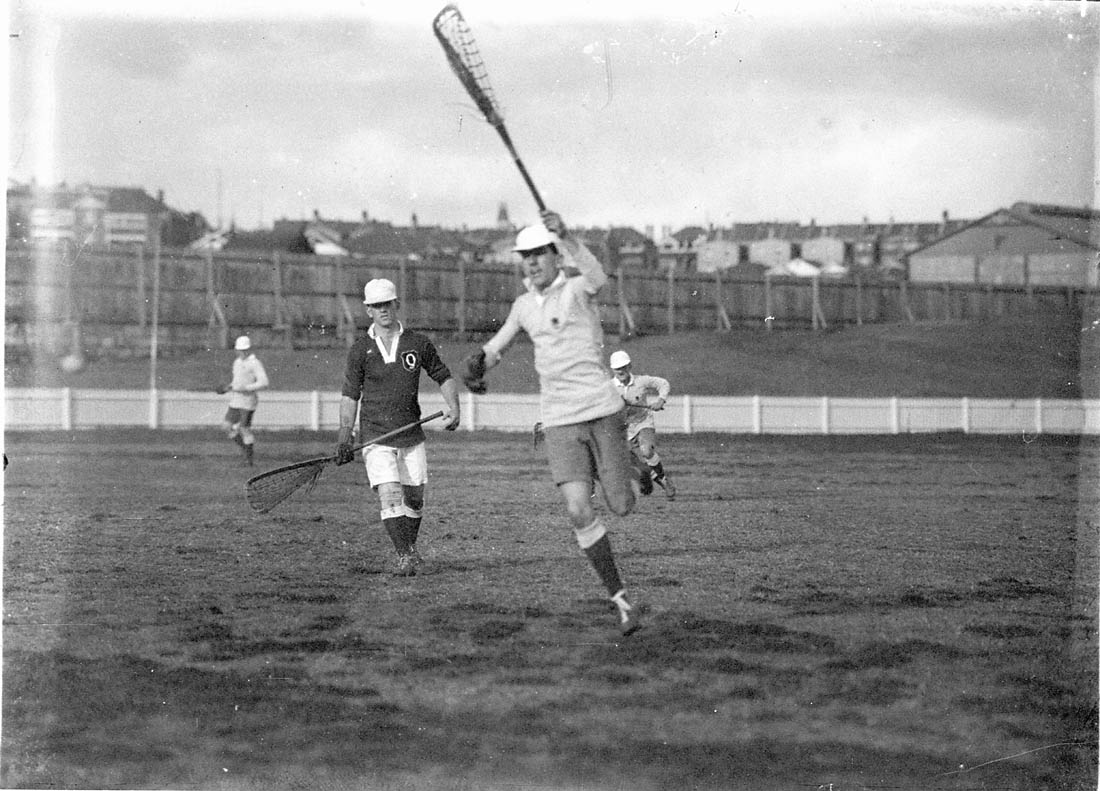
Queensland state team versus New South Wales; Sydney Cricket Ground, c. 1930

==== Queensland ====
The Brisbane Lacrosse Club was formed following a meeting at the YMCA on Monday 2 May 1887, and following the formation of a club at Ipswich and the imminent formation of one at South Brisbane, The Queensland Lacrosse Union was formed following a meeting at Lennon's Hotel on Tuesday 14 February 1888. In 1888 the Savage Lacrosse Club held a smoke social and annual meeting. Photographic records exist of interstate teams in 1889, 1904, 1905 and 1906. In July and August 1906 two interstate games were played against Victoria, the first game was won by Victoria 16–12. In the second game Queensland defeated Victoria 15–6.

A club had formed at Rockhampton in 1903. In 1907 there were various lacrosse clubs in the Brisbane metropolitan area. Photographs dated 1907 are labelled with the club names of Ottawa, Mohican, Delaware, Buffalo, Iroquois, Toombul and Wallaroo. In 1908 an association had been formed at Toowoomba, with a local competition running for several years.

The Kalinga Park sporting grounds were opened in 1910 with the support of local sporting clubs including the Kalinga Lacrosse Club. By the 1920s lacrosse was being played at Norman Park after being promoted by the Wilson family of Waratah Foundry fame.

The Nudgee Lacrosse Club also had a field at the Nudgee Boorah Ring in the 1920s and 1930s.

Despite this early success, lacrosse in Queensland was reduced to a small group of enthusiasts in the post World War II era. By the 1980s, all existing lacrosse clubs had disappeared. In the 1990s and 2000s (decade), lacrosse was played on an occasional basis in the Brisbane, Surfers Paradise and Townsville areas. A Queensland Lacrosse Association was in operation with the support of expatriate Victorians and local enthusiasts.

Recent efforts by the Queensland Lacrosse Association have resulted in new lacrosse clubs being formed in Brisbane (2009), the Gold Coast (2011), Toowoomba (2011) and the Sunshine Coast (2012). Additionally, student clubs have been formed at James Cook University campuses in Cairns (2013) and Townsville (2014), and the University of Queensland in Brisbane in 2016.

==== New South Wales ====
Lacrosse was introduced into New South Wales (NSW) on 19 July 1883 after a meeting of gentlemen at Ramford's Cambridge Club Hotel led to the formation of the Sydney Lacrosse Club. The Manly Daily records the local lacrosse club as having won their season in 1930. Other early lacrosse clubs included Burwood District, Balmain, Camden, Granville, Marrickville, Mohican, Mosman, Newtown, North Sydney, Petersham, Stanmore, St Stephen's Institute, University, Waverly and Wentworth. Lacrosse games were played on the Sydney Cricket ground in the 1930s; a NSW state team existed during this same period. The sport was sufficiently strong for a visiting Canadian team from Vancouver to tour Sydney in 1934. Lacrosse was also played at Glebe prior to World War II. Lacrosse in Sydney in the early period included an A and B division and competition was held for the Lassetter's Cup.

A Broken Hill Lacrosse Association existed in 1909, this included a YMCA Lacrosse Club.

Lacrosse was revived in NSW during the early 1990s by a small dedicated group of men and women. Initially this involved games of mixed lacrosse at Neutral Bay. A men's team competed successfully at the Paradise Lacrosse Tournament on the Gold Coast under the name "Basically Naked". Junior lacrosse began with a pilot at Gordon with the employment of two development officers, this saw up to 60 juniors playing modified lacrosse, some of whom went on to play the full version of the game. With the employment of a Development Officer by Lacrosse Australia, based in Sydney, it was hoped that the junior and senior games would take off. Teams/clubs were set up in Pennant Hills, Concord, Woollahra, Mosman and Sutherland. Games were more often than not held at Centennial Park in Sydney, although in the beginning the venue was Edgecliff, with some exhibition games held at Concord, Mosman and Sutherland.

==== Tasmania ====
It was reported in the Hobart Mercury that lacrosse was played in Tasmania in the mid-1880s, with the New Town Lacrosse Club calling for new members in 1884. In 1906 a number of lacrosse games were played by Victorian-based teams against Northern and Southern Tasmanian teams. In 1916 the Northern Tasmania Lacrosse Association abandoned the premiership competition due to the enlistment of men for the war effort. Lacrosse players were amongst those who were wounded or killed in the war. In 1932 a Tasmanian team played Victoria as a curtain raiser to the North versus South Football game. In the Hobart Mercury of 29 April 1940 it was lamented that although lacrosse had flourished prior to the Great War it had now died out.

=== Women's lacrosse ===
==== Pre-war ====
Women's lacrosse in Australia can trace its history as far back as 1904, when Miss Gwynneth Morris, a physical education teacher at Merton Hall, Melbourne Church of England Girl's Grammar School, introduced the sport as part of the school's commitment to team sports.

In 1907, ladies were practising lacrosse in the West Australian Goldfields under the tutelage of men from the Kalgoorlie Lacrosse Club.

The earliest recorded women's lacrosse club, the St George's Ladies' Lacrosse Club, was formed in 1913 in New South Wales, soon followed by a club at Manly. By 1914 there were four clubs, and a competition was in place. The NSW ladies' competition was suspended in July 1915, presumably in relation to the First World War, with no further reporting of competition after that date.

By 1930, girls' lacrosse was being instructed by Miss Louie Hardy at St Peter's Collegiate Girls' School and Girton House School in South Australia. In 1931, the South Australian Lacrosse Association discussed the introduction of women's lacrosse in the state.

In 1936, the Victorian Women's Amateur Lacrosse Association was formed. Games were centred around teams from the YWCA and Williamstown. By 1940, war time conditions saw the sport go into recession.

==== Re-establishment ====
It took until 1962 for women's lacrosse in Victoria to recommence. With support from Mal Taylor of the Williamstown Lacrosse Club 4 teams were formed (Williamstown 2, Footscray and Malvern). Mrs Joy Parker (former secretary of the Victorian Women's Amateur Lacrosse Association) became president of the newly reformed women's association. The South Australian Women's Lacrosse Association was also formed around the same time, with competition commencing in 1962. With lacrosse sticks in Australia in short supply, the South Australian Women's Lacrosse Association sold 12 women's sticks to the Victorian association for £4.

In 1962, Mal Taylor noted an advertisement in an Adelaide paper for women to play lacrosse. Mal used this as an avenue to create an interstate match. Under the guidance of Mrs Joy Parker, the Australian Women's Lacrosse Council (AWLC) was formed. Mrs Parker became the inaugural President following the first interstate match between Victoria and South Australia with Mrs Titter Secretary and Mrs L Rolley Treasurer.

In 1965, the Men's Lacrosse carnival was held in Perth, Western Australia and the AWLC were invited to play their annual interstate match between Victoria and South Australia during this carnival. The Western Australians were persuaded to form an Association and at the same time to join the AWLC. (Coincidentally they also entered into what became the first Women's Lacrosse Championship).

==== Growth ====
In 1975, the Tasmanian Women's Lacrosse Association was formed in Hobart. In 1978, Tasmania became a full member of the AWLC and entered their first official team in the Championships in Perth in 1978.

The Senior National Championships have been held on a yearly basis since 1978 with South Australia reigning supreme from 1985 through until 1996 when Victoria defeated them for the first time in the final for 12 years; a monumental win for Victoria and an end to a 12-year awesome victory stretch by South Australia.

In 1970, the first Under 16 National Championship was held and in 1982, the first U19 interstate match was played between South Australia and Victoria at the Senior Nationals in Adelaide.

== Lacrosse in Australia today ==
=== Local competitions ===
At present, the main centres for lacrosse are in Melbourne, Adelaide and Perth, with each city hosting multi-division club competitions in their respective metropolitan areas. Each of these cities have State League competitions for both men and women, which attract overseas players (the majority from the United States) who are hosted by local clubs to help strengthen their teams as well as develop junior lacrosse programs. The majority of teams, both senior and junior, in lacrosse competition throughout Australia are club teams, with a small few school and university teams that participate in club competition.

=== Interstate competition ===
Interstate competition, a legacy from the time when Australia consisted of its separate colonies, is a feature of many sports in Australia, lacrosse being no exception. Competitions are typically held as an annual week-long carnival, with the venue rotated between states. The "Nationals" are a highlight of the Australian lacrosse calendar, and feature the best lacrosse talent in the country with games played to a very high standard.

The first ever Interstate (then Intercolonial) match in Australia took place in Brisbane in 1887, with New South Wales defeating their hosts Queensland by 1 goal to nil. In 1888 Victoria defeated South Australia 5 – 1 at the Melbourne Cricket Ground in the first match between these two colonies. In 1910 the first Australian interstate lacrosse carnival was held at the MCG.

At the senior and under 18 age level, each state sends its select representative team. At under 15 level, a national tournament exists whereby member states send anywhere between one and three representative teams, in an effort to level out the competition between stronger and developing lacrosse regions. At present there are national carnivals at the senior, under 18 and under 15 levels for both men and women. Often a number of these events are held concurrently at the same venue.

The Australian Lacrosse League was introduced in 2004 to replace the senior men's national carnival by instead having state teams play each other twice, with double-headers (a Saturday and Sunday game) played over three weekends. Each state hosts one double-header and travels for the other. The two teams with the best win–loss record over the round-robin tournament progress to the final, played on the weekend following the last round-robin match. Currently, the strongest lacrosse-playing states of Victoria, South Australia and Western Australia compete in the ALL, but the long-term goal of the league is to include a team from every Australian state. After four years, however, a lack of support from South Australia and Victoria due to the increasing cost of participating the ALL-style competition saw the national championship revert to the traditional carnival format in 2008.

- List of Australian Lacrosse Senior National Champions

The first Australian Club Lacrosse Championships was contested in Adelaide on 7 June 2008. The women's championship was won by the Newport Ladies' Lacrosse Club of Victoria, while the men's championship was won by the Woodville Lacrosse Club of South Australia. The success of the inaugural event has led to the club national championships returning in 2009 with an expanded format, involving the premiers of the three major lacrosse playing states, plus a wildcard entry from one of those states to create a final four format. Due to the moving of the Nationals to the June long weekend, the 2013 Championships were held on 5 and 6 October 2013. Despite being held after the end of the 2013 season, it featured the respective state premiers of the 2012 season. Wembley declined the invitation to send its women's team, while Williamstown's men's team were a last minute withdrawal from the men's tournament. The women's event was a two-team affair with a single championship match, Brighton (SA) claiming its fourth successive Australian Club Championship with a victory over Newport (Vic). SA's Glenelg Lacrosse Club filled the vacancy left by Williamstown (Vic), competing with local rivals Brighton and WA's Bayswater and Wembley Lacrosse Clubs for the men's title. Bayswater became the first team from Western Australia to win the Australian Club Championship in defeating Brighton.

- List of Australian Club Lacrosse National Champions

With the return of lacrosse to the Olympic Games, Lacrosse Australia introduced a new national tournament known as Major League Sixes (MLS), based on the lacrosse sixes rules that will be used at the 2028 Summer Olympics in Los Angeles. With a new, franchise-based draft system with teams representing Australia's major cities, the MLS format departs from the traditional state-based representative model used in field and box lacrosse championships that favours the historically strong states of Victoria, South Australia and Western Australia and ensures an even and competitive tournament.

=== Australia in international competition ===
In 1907 Australia's first international lacrosse match against Canada was played at the MCG before a crowd of 14,000.

Australia has an important presence in the international scene, consistently finishing in the top three of the men's world championships, though have never won the trophy. At the 2014 World Lacrosse Championship, Australia finished outside the top three for the first time at the senior level, finishing in fourth spot (behind Canada, the United States and the Iroquois Nationals). They have also been the runner-up at the first three Under-19 Men's World Lacrosse Championship.

Australia's national women's teams have fared even better. Despite having only a small fraction of the playing pool of other countries, Australia have won two senior women's world championships (in 1986 and in 2005), as well as the inaugural Under 19 world championship in 1995. The main rival to Australia in international women's competition is the United States.

The World Men's Lacrosse Championships have been held in Australia three times – in 1974 (Melbourne), 1990 (Perth) and 2002 (Perth), while the Women's Lacrosse World Cup has been held once in Australia, hosted in Perth in 1989.

- Australia men's national lacrosse team
- Australia women's national lacrosse team
- Australia national indoor lacrosse team

== See also ==
- Lacrosse
- History of Lacrosse
- Federation of International Lacrosse
  - World Lacrosse Championship
  - Women's Lacrosse World Cup
- Australian Lacrosse League
- List of Victorian Lacrosse Premiers
- List of South Australian Lacrosse Premiers
- List of Western Australian Lacrosse Premiers
- List of Queensland Lacrosse Premiers
- List of Australian Lacrosse best and fairest players
- Australian Lacrosse Hall of Fame
- Category:Australian lacrosse players
