= Peter Inge =

Australian lacrosse player

Personal information
- Nicknames: PI, Magnum, Leroy Puma
- Nationality: Australian
- Born: 13 December 1977 (age 48) Adelaide, SA, Australia
- Height: 5 ft 10 in (178 cm)
- Weight: 180 lb (82 kg; 12 st 12 lb)

Sport
- Position: Midfield/Faceoff
- MLL teams: Boston Cannons (2003-2005); San Francisco Dragons (2006)
- Pro career: 2003–2006

Career highlights
- 2002 World Lacrosse Championship All World Team; OC Isaachsen Trophy winner 2002
Medal record
Men's field lacrosse
Representing Australia
World Championship
Bronze medal – third place	1998 United States
Bronze medal – third place	2002 Australia
Bronze medal – third place	2006 Canada
World U19 Championship
Silver medal – second place	1996 Japan

Peter Inge (born 13 December 1977) is a lacrosse player who was the first Australian to play in Major League Lacrosse, being drafted to the Boston Cannons in 2003.

Originally from the Woodville Lacrosse Club in South Australia, Inge first represented Australia at the 1996 ILF World Under 19 Championship, where they came runner-up to the United States. After competing in the senior Australian team alongside his brother James at the 1998 World Lacrosse Championship where Australia finished third, Inge stamped his mark on the world stage when in 2002 he was selected in the World All-Stars team following Australia's bronze medal at the championships in Perth. This performance was noticed by the Cannons and led him to become the first player drafted to the MLL with no NCAA lacrosse experience. Inge scored his first career goal in his debut on 31 May 2003. After being traded to the San Francisco Dragons after the 2005 season, Inge captained Australia to yet another third place in the 2006 World Lacrosse Championship.

Inge was Assistant coach to the Australia women's national lacrosse team in the 2009 Women's Lacrosse World Cup where Australia won the Silver Medal.

In 2025, Inge was elected to the inaugural class of the Australian Lacrosse Hall of Fame, in recognition of being one of Australia's most accomplished midfielders and face-off specialists.

== Statistics ==
=== MLL ===
Season	Team	GP	G	A	Pts	GB	FW	FO%
2003	Boston	12	2	4	6	52	182	47.9
2004	Boston	9	1	6	7	88	193	53.8
2005	Boston	7	0	0	0	29	58	51.3
2006	San Francisco	11	3	2	5	40	116	48.3
MLL totals		134	312	46	213	571	171	33.5
