= Best and fairest =

Award in Australian sport

In Australian sport, the best and fairest award recognises the player(s) adjudged to have had the best performance in a game or over a season for a given sporting club or competition. The awards are sometimes dependent on not receiving a suspension for misconduct or breaching the rules during that season. It is similar to most valuable player (MVP) awards in other team sports.

In the Australian Football League (AFL), the Brownlow Medal is awarded to the player who, provided he has not been suspended during the season, receives the most votes from the umpires for being the fairest and best player in games during the home-and-away season. In each game, the umpires award three votes to the player they judge to be the best afield in that game, two votes to the second-best player, and one vote to the third-best player. The votes are counted at a gala function on the Monday preceding the Grand Final. The eligibility of suspended or reprimanded players due to minor offences to win the award has frequently been questioned.

Another best and fairest honour, the Leigh Matthews Trophy, is voted on by the AFL's players and awarded by their trade union, the AFL Players Association. Unlike the Brownlow, players who have served disciplinary suspensions during the season are still eligible to win this award.

The oldest such award is the Magarey Medal, awarded to the "fairest and most brilliant" player in the South Australian National Football League (SANFL). The award was created by William Ashley Magarey—then chairman of the league—and was first awarded in 1898.

Best and fairest awards of major Australian football competitions
Medal	League	First awarded	Award criteria	Comments
Brownlow Medal	Australian Football League	1924	Fairest and best	Awarded by the league
AFL Women's best and fairest	AFL Women's	2017	Fairest and best	Awarded by the league
John Eales Medal	Wallabies	2002	Best	Awarded by the Australian Rugby Union and Rugby Union Players Association
Dally M Medal	National Rugby League	1980	Best and fairest	
Karyn Murphy Medal	NRL Women's	2018	Best and fairest	
Johnny Warren Medal	A-League	1989	Best and fairest	
Julie Dolan Medal	W-League	1996	Best and fairest	
Sandover Medal	West Australian Football League	1921	Fairest and best	Awarded by the league
Magarey Medal	South Australian National Football League	1898	Fairest and most brilliant	First awarded in 1898, it is the oldest league wide award in Australian rules football
J. J. Liston Trophy	Victorian Football League	1945	Best and fairest	Between 1923 and the 1941 the Recorder Cup was awarded, and between 1933 and 1940 the VFA Medal was also awarded
Grogan Medal	Queensland AFL	1946	Best and fairest	The De Little Medal was awarded earlier
William Leitch Medal	Tasmanian State League	1930	Best and fairest	A previous award also existed
Morrish Medal	TAC Cup	1947	Best and fairest	The Morrish Medal was also the best and fairest award in the VFL/AFL Under-19s competition which was superseded by the TAC Cup in 1992
Larke Medal	AFL Under 18 Championships, Division 1	1976	Best	
Hunter Harrison Medal	AFL Under 18 Championships, Division 2	1992	Best	
Phelan Medal	Sydney AFL		Best and fairest	
Baldock Medal	Northern Tasmanian Football League			
Nichols Medal	Northern Territory Football League	1946	Best and fairest	
Mulrooney Medal	AFL Canberra			

== See also ==
- List of Australian Lacrosse best and fairest players
- Man of the match
- Lady Byng Memorial Trophy, a similar National Hockey League award
