= East Fremantle Lacrosse Club =

The East Fremantle Lacrosse Club was founded in 1899 and is the oldest continually existing lacrosse club in Western Australia.

== History ==
Lacrosse first commenced in Western Australia in 1896 however in the first two years only social games were conducted. In 1898 four teams: Fremantle, Perth, Cottesloe and Mercantile were established and the first competition matches began. In April 1899 at the annual general meeting of the. Fremantle Lacrosse Club it was decided to form a second lacrosse club in Fremantle as the club was too strong for any of the other clubs. The original uniform was a long sleeved dark blue jersey with orange armbands and cuffs. In 1901 the uniform changed to a black jersey with a royal blue collar and cuffs.

The team won its first premiership in 1904. In 1909 East Fremantle amalgamated with Fremantle, with the club playing in the East Fremantle uniform and winning the premiership that year. In 1915 the competition ceased due to World War I and resumed in 1919. The club continued to play with Fremantle until 1926 when it resumed under its own name.

In 1934, the club again amalgamated with Fremantle retaining the club's colours but using the home ground of Fremantle. In 1940, the club won its next premiership, the club's success was repeated again the following year.

In 1957, the club was formally incorporated. In 1960 the club constructed permanent club rooms at Preston Point Reserve and in 1961 won the premiership. In 1966, the club established a women's side, which won its first premiership in 1967.

== See also ==
- List of Western Australian Lacrosse Premiers
