= List of Western Australian Lacrosse Premiers =

Men's Premiership Trophy: IJ Taylor Shield

Men's Minor Premiership Trophy: Lapsley Cup

Women's Premiership Trophy: Rae Reid Cup

| Year | Men | | | Women | | |
| Year | Premiers | | Runners-up | Premiers | Minor Premiers | Grand Final |
|---|---|---|---|---|---|---|
| 1898 | Mercantile | | Fremantle | no competition | | |
| 1899 | Banks | | Perth | no competition | | |
| 1900 | Fremantle | | Banks | no competition | | |
| 1901 | Banks | | Fremantle | no competition | | |
| 1902 | Fremantle | | East Fremantle | no competition | | |
| 1903 | Fremantle | | East Fremantle | no competition | | |
| 1904 | East Fremantle | | Swan | no competition | | |
| 1905 | Perth | | Swan | no competition | | |
| 1906 | Perth | | Swan | no competition | | |
| 1907 | Fremantle | | Perth | no competition | | |
| 1908 | Perth | | North Perth | no competition | | |
| 1909 | East Fremantle | | North Perth | no competition | | |
| 1910 | Fremantle | | Iroquois | no competition | | |
| | Premiers | Minor Premiers | Grand Final | no competition | | |
| 1911 | North Perth | North Perth | North Perth 7 – 4 Fremantle | no competition | | |
| 1912 | Iroquois | Iroquois | Perth 3 – 4 Iroquois | no competition | | |
| 1913 | Perth | Fremantle | Perth 11 – 2 Fremantle | no competition | | |
| 1914 | North Perth | Fremantle | North Perth 6 – 2 Fremantle | no competition | | |
| 1915 | no competition – World War I | | | no competition | | |
| 1916 | no competition – World War I | | | no competition | | |
| 1917 | no competition – World War I | | | no competition | | |
| 1918 | no competition – World War I | | | no competition | | |
| 1919 | no competition – World War I | | | no competition | | |
| | Premiers | | Runners-up | no competition | | |
| 1920 | North Perth | | Iroquois | no competition | | |
| 1921 | Perth | | North Perth | no competition | | |
| 1922 | Iroquois | | Perth | no competition | | |
| | Premiers | Minor Premiers | Grand Final | no competition | | |
| 1923 | Iroquois | Iroquois | Perth 8 – 11 Iroquois | no competition | | |
| 1924 | Iroquois | Iroquois | Iroquois 10 – 8 Fremantle | no competition | | |
| 1925 | Iroquois | Iroquois | Iroquois 14 – 3 Fremantle | no competition | | |
| 1926 | Fremantle | Iroquois | Iroquois 4 – 6 Fremantle (replay) | no competition | | |
| 1927 | Iroquois | Iroquois | Iroquois 7 – 5 Westrals | no competition | | |
| 1928 | Westrals | Westrals | Westrals 9 – 6 Fremantle | no competition | | |
| 1929 | Guildford | Guildford | Guildford 12 – 10 Fremantle | no competition | | |
| 1930 | Guildford | Guildford | Guildford 11 – 5 East Fremantle | no competition | | |
| 1931 | Mount Lawley | Mount Lawley | Mount Lawley 11 – 9 Guildford | no competition | | |
| 1932 | Mount Lawley | Mount Lawley | Mount Lawley 17 – 6 East Fremantle | no competition | | |
| 1933 | Mount Lawley | Mount Lawley | Mount Lawley 5 – 3 Guildford | no competition | | |
| 1934 | Mount Lawley | Mount Lawley | Mount Lawley 13 – 9 Midland Junction | no competition | | |
| 1935 | Mount Lawley | East Fremantle | Mount Lawley 13 – 8 Midland Junction | no competition | | |
| 1936 | Mount Lawley | East Fremantle | East Fremantle 7 – 11 Mount Lawley | no competition | | |
| 1937 | Midland Junction | Mount Lawley | Midland Junction 12 – 11 Mount Lawley | no competition | | |
| 1938 | Mount Lawley | Mount Lawley | Mount Lawley 9 – 7 Midland Junction | no competition | | |
| 1939 | Midland Junction | East Fremantle | Nedlands 6 – 16 Midland Junction | no competition | | |
| 1940 | East Fremantle | East Fremantle | East Fremantle 9 – 8 Perth | no competition | | |
| 1941 | East Fremantle | Midland Junction | Midland Junction 3 – 19 East Fremantle | no competition | | |
| 1942 | no competition – World War II | | | no competition | | |
| 1943 | no competition – World War II | | | no competition | | |
| 1944 | no competition – World War II | | | no competition | | |
| 1945 | no competition – World War II | | | no competition | | |
| 1946 | Midland Junction | Midland Junction | Perth 10 – 12 Midland Junction (ET) | no competition | | |
| 1947 | Midland Junction | Perth | Midland Junction 13 – 11 Perth | no competition | | |
| 1948 | Midland Junction | Wembley | Midland Junction 11 – 6 Perth | no competition | | |
| 1949 | Midland Junction | Perth | Midland Junction 10 – 4 Wembley | no competition | | |
| 1950 | Perth | Midland Junction | Midland Junction 10 – 12 Perth | no competition | | |
| 1951 | Midland Junction | Perth | Midland Junction 13 – 11 Perth | no competition | | |
| 1952 | Fremantle | Wembley | Fremantle 14 – 11 Midland Junction | no competition | | |
| 1953 | Wembley | Midland Junction | Wembley 6 – 4 Fremantle | no competition | | |
| 1954 | Wembley | Wembley | Wembley 13 – 6 Midland Junction | no competition | | |
| 1955 | Wembley | Wembley | Wembley 18 – 8 Midland Junction | no competition | | |
| 1956 | Wembley | Wembley | Wembley 17 – 6 Fremantle | no competition | | |
| 1957 | undecided | Wembley | Wembley 15 – 15 Fremantle | no competition | | |
| 1958 | Wembley | Wembley | Wembley 12 – 9 Fremantle | no competition | | |
| 1959 | Wembley | Wembley | Wembley 16 – 5 Fremantle | no competition | | |
| 1960 | Wembley | Wembley | Wembley 10 – 6 Nedlands-Subiaco | no competition | | |
| 1961 | East Fremantle | East Fremantle | East Fremantle 12 – 5 Nedlands-Subiaco | no competition | | |
| 1962 | South Perth | South Perth | South Perth 11 – 10 East Fremantle | no competition | | |
| 1963 | Nedlands-Subiaco | Nedlands-Subiaco | Nedlands-Subiaco 30 – 4 Wembley | no competition | | |
| 1964 | Nedlands-Subiaco | Nedlands-Subiaco | Nedlands-Subiaco 21 – 6 South Perth | no competition | | |
| 1965 | Nedlands-Subiaco | Nedlands-Subiaco | Nedlands-Subiaco 15 – 8 East Fremantle | no competition | | |
| 1966 | Nedlands-Subiaco | Nedlands-Subiaco | Nedlands-Subiaco 15 – 4 East Fremantle | East Fremantle | | |
| 1967 | Wembley | Nedlands-Subiaco | Nedlands-Subiaco 13 – 20 Wembley | Wembley | | |
| 1968 | Nedlands-Subiaco | Wembley | Wembley 15 – 22 Nedlands-Subiaco | Wembley | | |
| 1969 | Nedlands-Subiaco | Nedlands-Subiaco | Nedlands-Subiaco 18 – 13 Fremantle | Fremantle | | |
| 1970 | Fremantle | Nedlands-Subiaco | Nedlands-Subiaco 18 – 24 Fremantle | Wembley | | |
| 1971 | Bayswater | Nedlands-Subiaco | Nedlands-Subiaco 10 – 21 Bayswater | Fremantle | | |
| 1972 | Nedlands-Subiaco | Nedlands-Subiaco | Nedlands-Subiaco 24 – 18 Bayswater | Wembley | | |
| 1973 | South Perth | Bayswater | Bayswater 15 – 17 South Perth | Wembley | | |
| 1974 | Nedlands-Subiaco | Nedlands-Subiaco | Nedlands-Subiaco 20 – 16 Nollamara | Wembley | | |
| 1975 | East Fremantle | East Fremantle | East Fremantle 22 – 19 Nedlands-Subiaco | Wembley | | |
| 1976 | East Fremantle | East Fremantle | East Fremantle 27 – 15 Nollamara | Wembley | | |
| 1977 | Bayswater | East Fremantle | East Fremantle 16 – 26 Bayswater | Wembley | | |
| 1978 | East Fremantle | East Fremantle | East Fremantle 26 – 10 Nollamara | Wembley | | |
| 1979 | East Fremantle | East Fremantle | East Fremantle 18 – 13 Wembley | Wembley | | |
| 1980 | East Fremantle | East Fremantle | East Fremantle 14 – 13 Wembley | Wembley | | |
| 1981 | East Fremantle | East Fremantle | East Fremantle 18 – 9 Wembley | Wembley | | |
| 1982 | Wembley | East Fremantle | Wembley 18 – 6 Bayswater | Fremantle | | |
| 1983 | East Fremantle | East Fremantle | East Fremantle 18 – 14 Wembley | Fremantle | | |
| 1984 | East Fremantle | East Fremantle | East Fremantle 22 – 7 Wembley | Wembley | | |
| 1985 | East Fremantle | East Fremantle | East Fremantle 18 – 15 Nedlands-Subiaco | Wembley | | |
| 1986 | Wembley | East Fremantle | Wembley 14 – 9 Nedlands-Subiaco | Wembley | | |
| 1987 | Nedlands-Subiaco | East Fremantle | East Fremantle 10 – 13 Nedlands-Subiaco | Nedlands-Subiaco | | |
| 1988 | Nedlands-Subiaco | Nedlands-Subiaco | Nedlands-Subiaco 16 – 15 East Fremantle | Nedlands-Subiaco | | |
| 1989 | Nedlands-Subiaco | Nedlands-Subiaco | Nedlands-Subiaco 20 – 11 Wembley | East Fremantle | | |
| 1990 | East Fremantle | Subiaco | Subiaco 12 – 15 East Fremantle | Wembley | | |
| 1991 | East Fremantle | Subiaco | Subiaco 11 – 18 East Fremantle | Subiaco | | |
| 1992 | East Fremantle | East Fremantle | East Fremantle 16 – 11 Subiaco | Wembley | | |
| 1993 | Subiaco | Bayswater | Subiaco 14 – 13 East Fremantle | Nollamara | | |
| 1994 | East Fremantle | East Fremantle | East Fremantle 19 – 10 Subiaco | East Fremantle | | |
| 1995 | Subiaco | East Fremantle | East Fremantle 12 – 19 Subiaco | Subiaco | | |
| 1996 | Subiaco | East Fremantle | East Fremantle 11 – 13 Subiaco | East Fremantle | | |
| 1997 | Subiaco | East Fremantle | East Fremantle 12 – 13 Subiaco | East Fremantle | | |
| 1998 | Subiaco | East Fremantle | East Fremantle 15 – 17 Subiaco | Subiaco | | |
| 1999 | East Fremantle | Subiaco | Subiaco 12 – 14 East Fremantle | East Fremantle | | |
| 2000 | East Fremantle | Bayswater | Bayswater 12 – 14 East Fremantle | Wembley | | |
| 2001 | East Fremantle | East Fremantle | East Fremantle 18 – 15 Bayswater | East Fremantle | | |
| 2002 | Bayswater | Bayswater | Bayswater 14 – 6 East Fremantle | Wanneroo | | |
| 2003 | East Fremantle | East Fremantle | East Fremantle 21 – 7 Wembley | Wanneroo | | |
| 2004 | Wanneroo | East Fremantle | Wanneroo 8 – 5 Bayswater | Wembley | | |
| 2005 | East Fremantle | Bayswater | Bayswater 6 – 17 East Fremantle | Wembley | | |
| 2006 | Bayswater | East Fremantle | Bayswater 15 – 11 East Fremantle | Wembley | | Wembley d East Fremantle |
| 2007 | East Fremantle | East Fremantle | East Fremantle 14 – 8 Wanneroo | Wanneroo | Wembley | Wanneroo 12 – 10 Wembley |
| 2008 | Wembley | Wembley | Wembley 9 – 6 Bayswater | Wembley | Wembley | |
| 2009 | Wembley | Wembley | East Fremantle 9 – 16 Wembley | Wembley | Wembley | Wembley 13 – 7 East Fremantle |
| 2010 | Wembley | East Fremantle | Wembley 12 – 10 East Fremantle | East Fremantle | East Fremantle | Wembley 12 – 13 East Fremantle |
| 2011 | Wembley | Wembley | Wembley 12 – 3 Wanneroo | Wembley | Wembley | Wembley 22 – 10 East Fremantle |
| 2012 | Bayswater | Wembley | Bayswater 13 – 9 Wembley | Wembley | East Fremantle | Wembley 16 – 7 East Fremantle |
| 2013 | Bayswater | Bayswater | Bayswater 13 – 9 East Fremantle | Wembley | East Fremantle | Wembley 7 – 6 East Fremantle (OT) |
| 2014 | Bayswater | Wanneroo | Bayswater 7 – 5 East Fremantle | Wembley | East Fremantle | East Fremantle 12 – 16 Wembley |
| 2015 | Wanneroo | Wembley | Wanneroo 9 – 8 Wembley | East Fremantle | East Fremantle | East Fremantle 10 – 8 Wembley |
| 2016 | Wanneroo | Bayswater | Bayswater 7 – 9 Wanneroo (OT) | East Fremantle | Wembley | East Fremantle 10 – 3 Wanneroo |
| 2017 | East Fremantle | East Fremantle | East Fremantle 9 – 8 Bayswater (OT) | East Fremantle | Wembley | East Fremantle 11 – 7 Wembley |
| 2018 | Wembley | Wembley | Wembley 8 – 7 Bayswater | East Fremantle | East Fremantle | East Fremantle 15 – 8 Wembley |
| 2019 | Bayswater | Bayswater | East Fremantle 8 – 12 Bayswater | East Fremantle | East Fremantle | East Fremantle 12 – 8 Wembley |
| 2020 | Wembley | East Fremantle | East Fremantle 13 – 14 Wembley | Wembley | Subiaco | Subiaco 9 – 11 Wembley |
| 2021 | Wembley | Wembley | Wanneroo-Joondalup 6 – 13 Wembley | Wembley | Wembley Green | Wembley Green 12 – 7 East Fremantle |
| 2022 | Wembley | Wembley | Wembley 10 – 6 Wanneroo-Joondalup | Subiaco | Subiaco | Subiaco 10 – 9 East Fremantle |
| 2023 | Wembley | East Fremantle | Wembley 14 – 6 Wanneroo-Joondalup | Subiaco | East Fremantle | Subiaco 12 – 3 East Fremantle |
| 2024 | East Fremantle | East Fremantle | Wembley 7 – 8 East Fremantle (2OT) | East Fremantle | Subiaco | East Fremantle 14 – 10 Subiaco |
| 2025 | Wanneroo-Joondalup | Wanneroo-Joondalup | Wanneroo-Joondalup 14 – 13 East Fremantle (OT) | Subiaco | Phoenix | Subiaco 13 – 12 Phoenix |
| 2026 | Wanneroo-Joondalup | East Fremantle | East Fremantle 15 – 16 Wanneroo-Joondalup (OT) | Phoenix | Wanneroo-Joondalup | Subiaco 11 – 12 Phoenix (OT) |

== Premierships by Club ==
| Club | Men's | most recent | Women's | most recent |
|---|---|---|---|---|
| Wembley | 19 | 2023 | 30 | 2021 |
| East Fremantle | 26 | 2024 | 14 | 2024 |
| Subiaco | 16 | 1998 | 8 | 2025 |
| Fremantle/Phoenix | 8 | 1970 | 5 | 2026 |
| Bayswater | 8 | 2019 | 0 | n/a |
| Wanneroo-Joondalup | 5 | 2026 | 3 | 2007 |
| Midland Junction* | 7 | 1951 | 0 | n/a |
| Mount Lawley* | 7 | 1938 | 0 | n/a |
| Iroquois* | 6 | 1927 | 0 | n/a |
| Perth* | 6 | 1950 | 0 | n/a |
| North Perth* | 3 | 1920 | 0 | n/a |
| Banks* | 2 | 1901 | 0 | n/a |
| Guildford* | 2 | 1930 | 0 | n/a |
| South Perth* | 2 | 1973 | 0 | n/a |
| Mercantile* | 1 | 1898 | 0 | n/a |
| Westrals* | 1 | 1928 | 0 | n/a |
| Nollamara* | 0 | n/a | 1 | 1993 |

* defunct club

== See also ==
- Lacrosse in Australia
