= Lambton Mount =

Canadian-born Australian businessman

Lambton Le Breton Mount
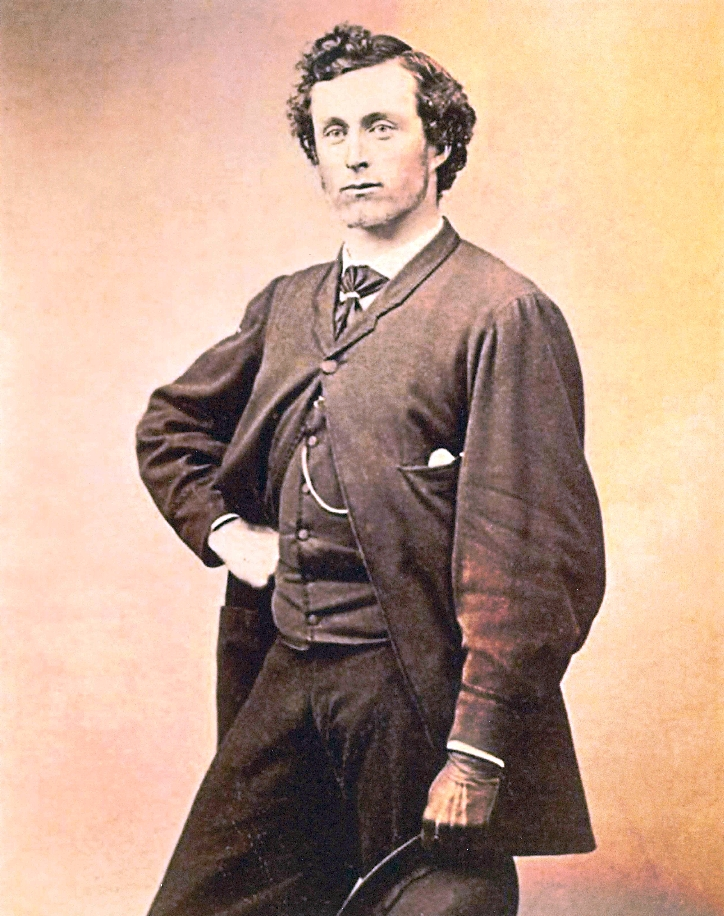
- A portrait of Mount taken about 1864
- Born: March 12, 1836 or June 10, 1837; Montreal, Lower Canada
- Died: June 12, 1931 (aged 95); London, England
- Occupations: Pastoralist, Glass Bottle Manufacturer
- Known for: Father of Australian lacrosse

Lambton Le Breton Mount (12 March 1836 – 12 June 1931) was a Canadian-born Australian businessman. He is credited with introducing the sport of lacrosse to Australia.

In 1853, Mount emigrated from the Province of Canada to the Colony of Victoria with other family members. During the early 1860s, he was a well-known athlete, running against Henry Colden Harrison in a series of foot races. In 1866, with his brother Frank and the poet Adam Lindsay Gordon, Mount migrated to Western Australia, where they were business partners in an unsuccessful sheep farm in Balingup. The Mounts were also early settlers in the north west Western Australia and held a pastoral lease on the De Grey River, between 1866 and 1868. They then returned to Victoria.

Mount imported forty lacrosse sticks in 1876, an initiative that led to the first match of lacrosse held in Australia, at Albert Park. The sport grew quickly and within two years, the Victorian Lacrosse Association had 120 members.

In his later years, Mount was prominent as a manufacturer of glass bottles in Melbourne. He became president of the Victorian Chamber of Manufacturers and was on the Commission for the Centennial International Exhibition in 1888.

== See also ==
- Lacrosse
- History of Lacrosse
- Lacrosse in Australia
- Category:Australian lacrosse players
