= List of Victorian Lacrosse Premiers =

Men's Premiership Trophy: Joel Fox Shield (1924–present)

Women's Premiership Trophy: Fearon Cup (1962–present)

Year	Men			Women		
Year	Premiers		Runners-up	Premiers	Minor Premiers	Grand Final
1878*	Reds		Blues	no competition		
1879	Carlton			no competition		
1880	Fitzroy		Melbourne	no competition		
1881	Melbourne			no competition		
1882	Fitzroy		Carlton	no competition		
1883	South Melbourne		Collingwood	no competition		
1884	South Melbourne		Melbourne	no competition		
1885	Collingwood		Fitzroy	no competition		
1886	Melbourne University		South Melbourne (defeated 2–0 in play-off)	no competition		
1887	Melbourne University			no competition		
1888	South Melbourne			no competition		
1889	Melbourne University			no competition		
1890	Essendon			no competition		
1891	Collingwood		Melbourne University	no competition		
1892	Caulfield		Collingwood	no competition		
1893	Caulfield		Collingwood	no competition		
1894	Caulfield		Essendon	no competition		
1895	Melbourne University		Essendon	no competition		
1896	Essendon		MCC	no competition		
1897	Melbourne University		MCC	no competition		
1898	MCC		Melbourne University	no competition		
1899	Melbourne University		MCC	no competition		
1900	Melbourne University		Essendon	no competition		
1901	MCC		Collegians	no competition		
1902	MCC		Melbourne University	no competition		
1903	Essendon		MCC	no competition		
1904	Essendon		MCC	no competition		
1905	St Kilda		MCC	no competition		
1906	Essendon		Hawksburn	no competition		
1907	Essendon		Hawksburn	no competition		
1908	Essendon		Malvern	no competition		
1909	Essendon		South Yarra	no competition		
1910	Essendon		Malvern	no competition		
1911	Essendon		South Yarra (defeated 11–8 in play-off)	no competition		
1912	South Yarra		Essendon	no competition		
1913	South Yarra		Melbourne University	no competition		
1914	South Yarra		Melbourne University	no competition		
1915	Melbourne University		Eastern Suburbs	no competition		
1916	Adult Deaf		Malvern	no competition		
1917	Malvern		Adult Deaf	no competition		
1918	Malvern		Hawthorn	no competition		
1919	Hawthorn		Brighton	no competition		
1920	Melbourne University		MCC	no competition		
1921	MCC		Hawthorn	no competition		
	Premiers	Minor Premiers	Grand Final	no competition		
1922	Brighton	Brighton	MCC 7 – 16 Brighton	no competition		
1923	Brighton	Malvern	Brighton 8 – 7 Malvern	no competition		
1924	Malvern	Malvern	Melbourne University 6 – 8 Malvern	no competition		
1925	Malvern	Malvern	Malvern 12 – 7 MCC	no competition		
1926	Malvern	Malvern	MCC 7 – 8 Malvern	no competition		
1927	MCC	Malvern	MCC 8 – 7 Malvern	no competition		
1928	Malvern	Malvern	Malvern 15 – 1 Williamstown	no competition		
1929	Malvern	Malvern	Williamstown 5 – 9 Malvern	no competition		
1930	Coburg	Coburg	Coburg 8 – 5 Malvern	no competition		
1931	Malvern	MCC	Malvern 9 – 4 MCC	no competition		
1932	Malvern	Malvern	Malvern 16 – 5 MCC	no competition		
1933	Malvern	Malvern	MCC 7 – 11 Malvern	no competition		
1934	Malvern	Malvern	Malvern 22 – 2 MCC	no competition		
1935	Malvern	Malvern	Malvern 13 – 6 Williamstown	no competition		
1936	Malvern	Malvern	Malvern 14 – 7 Williamstown			
1937	Malvern	Malvern	Williamstown 6 – 16 Malvern			
1938	Malvern	Malvern	Malvern 17 – 10 Williamstown			
1939	Malvern	Malvern	Malvern 16 – 5 Camberwell	Williamstown		Williamstown 9 – 0 YWCA
1940	Malvern	Malvern	Malvern 29 – 10 Glen Iris			
1941	Caulfield	Malvern	Malvern 16 – 19 Caulfield	competition in recess		
1942	no competition – World War II			competition in recess		
1943	Caulfield		Caulfield 17 – 15 Malvern (ET)	competition in recess		
1944	Malvern	Malvern	Malvern 25 – 17 Caulfield	competition in recess		
1945	Malvern	Malvern	Malvern 23 – 12 Caulfield	competition in recess		
1946	Malvern	Malvern	Malvern 9 – 7 Williamstown	competition in recess		
1947	Malvern	Malvern	Malvern 15 – 11 Old Trinity	competition in recess		
1948	Malvern		Malvern 17 – 13 Caulfield	competition in recess		
1949	Caulfield	Malvern	Malvern 6 – 9 Caulfield	competition in recess		
1950	Malvern	Malvern	Malvern 12 – 8 Old Trinity	competition in recess		
1951	Malvern	Malvern	Malvern 15 – 5 Caulfield	competition in recess		
1952	Malvern	Malvern Black	Malvern Black 21 – 7 Melbourne High School Old Boys	competition in recess		
1953	Malvern	Malvern Black	Malvern Black 6 – 1 Caulfield	competition in recess		
1954	Malvern	Malvern Black	Malvern Black 16 – 6 Melbourne High School Old Boys	competition in recess		
1955	Malvern	Malvern Black	Malvern Black 10 – 8 Caulfield	competition in recess		
1956	Malvern	Malvern Black	Malvern Black 9 – 6 Melbourne High School Old Boys	competition in recess		
1957	Malvern	Malvern	Malvern 8 – 4 Melbourne High School Old Boys	competition in recess		
1958	Malvern	Malvern	Malvern 13 – 7 Caulfield	competition in recess		
1959	Malvern	Malvern	Malvern 9 – 7 Caulfield	competition in recess		
1960	Caulfield	Caulfield	Caulfield 15 – 9 Malvern (replay)	competition in recess		
1961	Caulfield		Caulfield 11 – 10 Malvern	competition in recess		
1962	Caulfield		Caulfield 11 – 6 Malvern	Footscray		Footscray 12 – 1 Malvern
1963	Williamstown		Williamstown Fearon 22 – 14 Malvern	Footscray		Footscray 18 – 0 Malvern
1964	Malvern		Malvern 17 – 15 Williamstown Fearon	Footscray		Footscray 9 – 4 Williamstown
1965	Williamstown		Williamstown – Malvern	Williamstown		
1966	Caulfield		Caulfield – Malvern	Williamstown		
1967	Williamstown		Williamstown – Malvern	Williamstown		
1968	Williamstown		Williamstown – Malvern	Williamstown		
1969	Williamstown		Williamstown – Malvern	Williamstown		
1970	Williamstown		Williamstown – Malvern	Williamstown		
1971	Williamstown		Williamstown – Caulfield	Williamstown		
1972	Malvern		Malvern 25 – 24 Williamstown	Williamstown		
1973	Williamstown		Williamstown – Malvern	Williamstown		
1974	Malvern		Malvern 23 – 19 Williamstown	Williamstown		
1975	Williamstown		Williamstown – Malvern	Williamstown		
1976	Williamstown		Williamstown 20 – 13 Malvern	Williamstown		
1977	Williamstown		Williamstown 24 – 12 Chadstone	Newport		Newport 1 – 0 Williamstown
1978	Williamstown		Williamstown – Surrey Park	Newport		Newport – Caulfield
1979	Williamstown		Williamstown – Surrey Park	Newport		
1980	Williamstown		Williamstown – Malvern	Williamstown		
1981	Surrey Park		Surrey Park – Williamstown	Williamstown		
1982	Williamstown		Williamstown – Surrey Park	Newport		
1983	Williamstown		Williamstown – Surrey Park	Newport		
1984	Surrey Park		Surrey Park – Williamstown	Williamstown		
1985	Williamstown		Williamstown 18 – 15 Chadstone	Caulfield		Caulfield 2 – 0 Newport
1986	Williamstown		Williamstown – MCC	Newport		
1987	Malvern		Malvern 17 – 16 Chadstone	Newport		
1988	Surrey Park		Surrey Park 19 – 17 Malvern	Williamstown		
1989	Malvern		Malvern 18 – 16 Williamstown	Newport		
1990	Williamstown		Williamstown 27 – 13 Surrey Park	Newport		
1991	Williamstown		Williamstown 18 – 11 Surrey Park	Newport		
1992	Williamstown		Williamstown – Surrey Park	Williamstown		
1993	Surrey Park		Surrey Park – Williamstown	Newport		
1994	Malvern		Malvern 22 – 14 Williamstown	Newport		
1995	Surrey Park		Surrey Park – Malvern	Newport		
1996	Malvern		Malvern – Williamstown	Caulfield		
1997	Malvern		Williamstown 9 – 17 Malvern	Newport		
1998	Williamstown		Williamstown 13 – 8 Eltham	Williamstown		
1999	Williamstown	Williamstown	Williamstown 20 – 8 Eltham	Newport		
2000	Williamstown		Williamstown 16 – 14 Eltham	Caulfield		
2001	Williamstown		Williamstown 22 – 12 Eltham	Caulfield		
2002	Malvern		Malvern 9 – 8 Eltham	Caulfield		
2003	Williamstown	Williamstown	Williamstown 17 – 9 Caulfield	Caulfield		
2004	Eltham	Eltham	Eltham 16 – 11 Williamstown	Newport		
2005	Eltham	Williamstown	Eltham 14 – 8 Williamstown	Caulfield	Caulfield	Caulfield 10 – 5 Newport
2006	Eltham	Williamstown	Williamstown 12 – 13 Eltham	Newport	Newport	Newport 11 – 10 Footscray (2OT)
2007	Eltham	Eltham	Eltham 17 – 7 Surrey Park	Newport	Newport	Newport 7 – 6 Footscray
2008	Williamstown	Eltham	Eltham 7 – 12 Williamstown	Newport	Newport	Newport 10 – 4 Footscray
2009	Williamstown	Williamstown	Williamstown 15 – 9 Surrey Park	Footscray	Newport	Newport 4 – 7 Footscray
2010	Williamstown	Williamstown	Williamstown 11 – 6 Surrey Park	Newport	Footscray	Footscray 4 – 10 Newport
2011	Surrey Park	Surrey Park	Williamstown 11 – 17 Surrey Park	Newport	Footscray	Footscray 8 – 10 Newport
2012	Williamstown	Williamstown	Williamstown 18 – 10 Malvern	Newport	Newport	Newport 12 – 3 Footscray
2013	Footscray	Williamstown	Surrey Park 7 – 10 Footscray	Footscray	Footscray	Footscray 9 – 6 Newport
2014	Surrey Park	Williamstown	Footscray 10 – 12 Surrey Park (OT)	Newport	Footscray	Footscray 6 – 7 Newport
2015	Williamstown	Williamstown	Williamstown 7 – 6 Footscray	Newport	Newport	Newport 8 – 6 Footscray
2016	Williamstown	Footscray	Footscray 7 – 12 Williamstown	Newport	Newport	Footscray 7 – 9 Newport
2017	Williamstown	Footscray	Camberwell 6 – 8 Williamstown	Footscray	Footscray	Footscray 7 – 5 Newport
2018	Footscray	Williamstown	Footscray 9 – 8 Williamstown	Newport	Newport	Newport 7 – 5 Footscray
2019	Williamstown	Williamstown	Footscray 10 – 18 Williamstown	Footscray	Footscray	Footscray 14 – 7 Newport
2020	no competition – COVID-19 pandemic					
2021	competition not completed – COVID-19 pandemic					
2022	Footscray	Footscray	Footscray 15 – 13 Williamstown	Footscray	Footscray	Footscray 15 – 2 Newport
2023	Footscray	Footscray	Footscray 12 – 8 Malvern	Footscray	Footscray	Footscray 15 – 10 Williamstown
2024	Footscray	Williamstown	Williamstown 13 – Footscray 14 (OT)	Footscray	Williamstown	Williamstown 9 – 12 Footscray
2025	Williamstown	Williamstown	Williamstown 13 – Malvern 12	Footscray	Footscray	Footscray 11 – 10 Newport
2026	Malvern	Malvern	Malvern 15 – Williamstown 12	Footscray	Footscray	Footscray 14 – 7 Newport

* Unofficial competition – Victorian Lacrosse Association not formed until 1879

== Premierships by Club ==
Club	Men's	Most Recent	Women's	Most Recent
Malvern	42	2026	0	n/a
Williamstown	35	2025	0	n/a
Newport	0	n/a	26	2018
Williamstown Women's LC	0	n/a	18	1998
Footscray	5	2024	12	2026
Caulfield^{†}	7	1966	7	2005
Essendon*	10	1911	0	n/a
Melbourne University	9	1920	0	n/a
Surrey Park	7	2014	0	n/a
MCC	5	1927	0	n/a
Eltham	4	2007	0	n/a
South Melbourne*	3	1888	0	n/a
Caulfield* (19^{th Cen})^{†}	3	1894	0	n/a
South Yarra*	3	1914	0	n/a
Fitzroy*	2	1882	0	n/a
Collingwood*	2	1891	0	n/a
Brighton*	2	1923	0	n/a
Carlton*	1	1879	0	n/a
Melbourne*	1	1881	0	n/a
St Kilda*	1	1905	0	n/a
Adult Deaf*	1	1916	0	n/a
Hawthorn*	1	1919	0	n/a
Coburg*	1	1930	0	n/a

* defunct club

† The current Caulfield Lacrosse Club was formed in 1909. A previous Caulfield Lacrosse Club won three VLA premiership in 1892, 1893 and 1894

== See also ==
- Lacrosse in Australia
