= List of South Australian Lacrosse Premiers =

Men's Premiership Trophy: C L Abbott Shield (1924- )

Men's Minor Premiership Trophy: Chisholm Trophy (1963- )

Women's Premiership Trophy: Rowley Shield (1962- )

Year	Men			Women		
Year	Premiers		Runners-up	Premiers	Minor Premiers	Grand Final
1885*	Adelaide		Noarlunga	no competition		
1886*	Adelaide		Noarlunga	no competition		
1887*	North Adelaide		Adelaide	no competition		
1888	North Adelaide		Adelaide	no competition		
1889	North Adelaide		Adelaide	no competition		
1890	Adelaide University		Adelaide	no competition		
1891	Adelaide University		Iroquois	no competition		
1892	Iroquois		Adelaide University	no competition		
1893	Iroquois		Adelaide University; North Adelaide	no competition		
1894	Adelaide University		North Adelaide; Iroquois	no competition		
1895	Adelaide University		North Adelaide	no competition		
1896	Adelaide University		North Adelaide	no competition		
1897	North Adelaide		Adelaide University	no competition		
1898	Adelaide University		North Adelaide	no competition		
1899	Iroquois		Adelaide University	no competition		
1900	Iroquois		Adelaide University	no competition		
1901	Iroquois		Adelaide University	no competition		
1902	Adelaide University		Sturt; Holdfast Bay	no competition		
1903	Sturt		Adelaide University	no competition		
1904	Port Adelaide		Sturt	no competition		
1905	Sturt		East Torrens	no competition		
1906	Sturt		North Adelaide	no competition		
1907	Sturt		East Torrens; North Adelaide	no competition		
1908	Adelaide University		North Adelaide	no competition		
	Premiers	Minor Premiers	Grand Final	no competition		
1909	North Adelaide	East Torrens	North Adelaide 9 – 4 East Torrens	no competition		
1910	North Adelaide	North Adelaide	Sturt 3 – 10 North Adelaide	no competition		
1911	Sturt	Sturt	Sturt 9 – 2 Adelaide University	no competition		
1912	Sturt	Sturt	Sturt 12 – 7 Port Adelaide	no competition		
1913	Sturt	Adelaide University	Sturt 15 – 4 Adelaide University	no competition		
1914	Sturt	Sturt	Adelaide University 1 – 5 Sturt	no competition		
1915	Sturt	East Torrens	Sturt 4 – 0 East Torrens	no competition		
1916	no competition – First World War			no competition		
1917	no competition – First World War			no competition		
1918	no competition – First World War			no competition		
1919	Sturt	East Torrens	Sturt 7 – 3 East Torrens	no competition		
1920	Sturt	Sturt	Sturt 10 – 0 East Torrens	no competition		
1921	Sturt	Sturt	no finals played Adelaide University runners-up East Torrens win "Eliminating Round" post-season knockout competition defeating Sturt 6-2	no competition		
1922	East Torrens	East Torrens	East Torrens 6 – 3 Sturt	no competition		
1923	Adelaide University	Adelaide University	Adelaide University 4 – 0 North Adelaide	no competition		
1924	Adelaide University	Adelaide University	Adelaide University 5 – 2 North Adelaide	no competition		
1925	Sturt	Sturt	Sturt 11 – 3 East Torrens	no competition		
1926	Goodwood	Goodwood	Goodwood 4 – 3 Sturt (ET)	no competition		
1927	North Adelaide	North Adelaide	North Adelaide 9 – 4 Sturt	no competition		
1928	North Adelaide	North Adelaide	Goodwood 2 – 11 North Adelaide	no competition		
1929	North Adelaide	North Adelaide	Goodwood 10 – 13 North Adelaide	no competition		
1930	Sturt	Sturt	East Torrens 3 – 9 Sturt	no competition		
1931	Port Adelaide	Port Adelaide	Port Adelaide 9 – 7 Goodwood	no competition		
1932	Port Adelaide	Sturt	Port Adelaide 13 – 6 Sturt	no competition		
1933	East Torrens	East Torrens	Sturt 7 – 14 East Torrens	no competition		
1934	Sturt	Sturt	Sturt 11 – 4 East Torrens	no competition		
1935	Sturt	East Torrens	Sturt 7 – 6 East Torrens	no competition		
1936	East Torrens	East Torrens	Brighton 7 – 10 East Torrens	no competition		
1937	Brighton	East Torrens	Brighton 11 – 8 East Torrens	no competition		
1938	Brighton	Brighton	Brighton 13 – 10 St Peter's Glenelg	no competition		
1939	Brighton	Brighton	Brighton 9 – 7 East Torrens	no competition		
1940	Brighton	Brighton	East Torrens 3 – 13 Brighton	no competition		
1941	East Torrens	East Torrens	Brighton 11 – 12 East Torrens (ET)	no competition		
1942^{†}	Adelaide University	Adelaide University	Adelaide University 16 – 12 East Torrens	no competition		
1943^{†}	East Torrens	East Torrens	Adelaide University 12 – 14 East Torrens	no competition		
1944^{†}	Adelaide University	Adelaide University	Adelaide University 28 – 13 East Torrens	no competition		
1945^{†}	West Torrens	Brighton	West Torrens 11 – 6 Brighton	no competition		
1946	Brighton	Brighton	Brighton 9 – 8 East Torrens	no competition		
1947	East Torrens	East Torrens	East Torrens 8 – 4 Brighton	no competition		
1948	East Torrens	East Torrens	East Torrens 5 – 4 Brighton	no competition		
1949	Port Adelaide	East Torrens	Port Adelaide 11 – 8 East Torrens	no competition		
1950	East Torrens	Port Adelaide	East Torrens 14 – 7 Port Adelaide	no competition		
1951	East Torrens	East Torrens	East Torrens 10 – 5 Port Adelaide	no competition		
1952	East Torrens	East Torrens	Port Adelaide 9 – 13 East Torrens	no competition		
1953	East Torrens	East Torrens	East Torrens 15 – 8 North Adelaide	no competition		
1954	East Torrens	East Torrens	East Torrens 8 – 6 Sturt	no competition		
1955	Port Adelaide	Port Adelaide	Port Adelaide 13 – 8 Sturt	no competition		
1956	Sturt	Port Adelaide	Port Adelaide 8 – 13 Sturt	no competition		
1957	East Torrens	East Torrens	Port Adelaide 8 – 17 East Torrens	no competition		
1958	Port Adelaide	Port Adelaide	Port Adelaide 11 – 7 North Adelaide	no competition		
1959	Port Adelaide	Port Adelaide	Port Adelaide 20 – 14 Brighton (replay)	no competition		
1960	North Adelaide	North Adelaide	North Adelaide 20 – 10 Port Adelaide	no competition		
1961	Brighton	North Adelaide	North Adelaide 9 – 17 Brighton	no competition		
1962	Brighton	Sturt	Sturt 9 – 12 Brighton	Brighton High School	Wallabies	Brighton High School 13 – 12 Kinkajous
1963	Brighton	Brighton	Brighton 18 – 17 Sturt	Brighton High School	Brighton High School	Brighton High School Gold 6 – 3 Plympton High School
1964	Brighton	Brighton	Sturt 10 – 13 Brighton	Brighton Kinkajous	Plymptonians	Plymptonians 3 – 8 Brighton Kinkajous
1965	Sturt	Brighton	Brighton Yellow 15 – 18 Sturt	Plymptonians	Seacombe	Seacombe 4 – 10 Plymptonians
1966	Brighton	Brighton	Brighton Yellow 21 – 16 East Torrens	Seacombe	Plymptonians Blue	Plymptonians Blue 4 – 7 Seacombe
1967	East Torrens	East Torrens	Brighton 12 – 13 East Torrens	Seacombe	Brighton	Brighton 2 – 3 Seacombe
1968	Brighton	Brighton	Brighton 21 – 20 East Torrens (ET)	Brighton	Plymptonians (I)	Brighton 4 – 3 Seacombe
1969	Brighton	East Torrens	Brighton 18 – 17 East Torrens (ET)	Brighton	Brighton	Brighton 10 – 6 Plympton
1970	Brighton	Brighton	Brighton 36 – 12 East Torrens	Seacombe	Seacombe	Seacombe 5 – 4 Plympton
1971	Brighton	Brighton	Brighton 32 – 13 Adelaide University	Plympton	Plympton	Plympton 14 – 0 Brighton
1972	Brighton	Brighton	Brighton 27 – 15 East Torrens	Seacombe	Seacombe (I)	Seacombe (I) 11 – 5 Plympton
1973	Brighton	Brighton	Brighton 19 – 12 Adelaide University	Seacombe	Seacombe (I)	Seacombe (I) 11 – 6 Woodville
1974	Brighton	Adelaide University	Brighton 23 – 9 Adelaide University	Seacombe	Seacombe Green	Seacombe Green 12 – 4 Woodville
1975	Adelaide University	Glenelg	Brighton 12 – 18 Adelaide University	Seacombe	Seacombe Green	Seacombe Green 16 – 4 Woodville
1976	Glenelg	Glenelg	Glenelg 21 – 18 Adelaide University	Seacombe	Seacombe Green	Seacombe Green 14 – 3 Seacombe Black
1977	Brighton	Brighton	Adelaide University 13 – 16 Brighton	Seacombe	Seacombe White	Seacombe White 5 – 11 Seacombe Gold
1978	Brighton	East Torrens Payneham	Brighton 17 – 9 ETP	Seacombe	Seacombe Gold	Seacombe Gold 9 – 6 Seacombe White
1979	Glenelg	East Torrens Payneham	Glenelg 14 – 13 ETP	Seacombe	Seacombe Green	Seacombe Green 11 – 4 Seacombe White
1980	East Torrens Payneham	East Torrens Payneham	ETP 18 – 12 Glenelg	Seacombe	Seacombe Green	Seacombe Green 10 – 3 Brighton
1981	East Torrens Payneham	Burnside	ETP 20 – 6 Burnside	Adelaide CAE	Seacombe Green	Seacombe Green 1 – 4 Adelaide CAE
1982	East Torrens Payneham	East Torrens Payneham	Burnside 12 – 15 ETP	College	College	College 2 – 1 Adelaide University
1983	East Torrens Payneham	East Torrens Payneham	ETP 13 – 11 Glenelg	College	Seacombe	College 11 – 2 Seacombe
1984	Glenelg	East Torrens Payneham	ETP 10 – 15 Glenelg	Seacombe	Seacombe	College 6 – 10 Seacombe
1985	Sturt	Burnside	Sturt 17 – 14 Burnside	College	Seacombe	Seacombe 5 – 6 College
1986	Sturt	Sturt	Sturt 18 – 15 ETP	College	Seacombe	College 5 – 3 Sturt
1987	Brighton	Glenelg	Glenelg 14 – 15 Brighton (ET)	College	Seacombe	College 5 – 4 Seacombe
1988	Glenelg	Brighton	Brighton 14 – 16 Glenelg	Burnside	Burnside	walkover
1989	Glenelg	Sturt	Sturt 12 – 18 Glenelg	Adelaide University	Burnside	Burnside 3 – 8 Adelaide University
1990	Sturt	Sturt	Sturt 20 – 14 West Torrens	Glenelg	Glenelg	Glenelg 9 – 5 College
1991	West Torrens	West Torrens	West Torrens 20 – 9 Sturt	Glenelg	Glenelg	Glenelg 6 – 5 College
1992	West Torrens	West Torrens	West Torrens 25 – 11 Brighton	College	Glenelg	Glenelg 5 – 6 College
1993	West Torrens	West Torrens	West Torrens 22 – 7 Glenelg	College	Glenelg	Glenelg 2 – 5 College
1994	Sturt	West Torrens	Sturt 18 – 16 West Torrens	University of South Australia	University of South Australia	Glenelg 4 – 7 UniSA
1995	West Torrens	West Torrens	West Torrens 20 – 10 Glenelg	Glenelg	Glenelg	UniSA 6 – 8 Glenelg
1996	West Torrens	West Torrens	West Torrens 13 – 12 Glenelg (ET)	Glenelg	Glenelg	Glenelg 13 – 4 Stingrays
1997	West Torrens	Woodville	Woodville 8 – 19 West Torrens	Glenelg	Glenelg	Glenelg 10 – 2 Brighton
1998	Woodville	West Torrens	West Torrens 13 – 14 Woodville (ET)	Glenelg	Glenelg	Glenelg 9 – 7 Brighton
1999	Woodville	Woodville	Woodville 18 – 11 West Torrens	Brighton	Brighton	Glenelg 8 – 9 Brighton
2000	Woodville	Woodville	Woodville 16 – 8 Sturt	Glenelg	Glenelg	Glenelg 11 – 10 Brighton
2001	Woodville	Sturt	Sturt 11 – 20 Woodville	Glenelg	Glenelg	Glenelg 12 – 7 Brighton
2002	Woodville	Woodville	Sturt 8 – 15 Woodville	Glenelg	Glenelg	Glenelg 15 – 5 Brighton
2003	Sturt	Brighton	Brighton 15 – 20 Sturt	Glenelg	Glenelg	Glenelg 16 – 6 Brighton
2004	Glenelg	Glenelg	Glenelg 13 – 11 West Torrens	Brighton	Brighton	Brighton 14 – 7 Wilderness
2005	Woodville	Woodville	Woodville 12 – 7 Sturt	Glenelg	Brighton	Glenelg 19 – 16 Brighton
2006	Glenelg	Burnside	Glenelg 12 – 7 Burnside	Wilderness	Wilderness	Wilderness 13 – 12 Brighton
2007	Woodville	Woodville	Woodville 14 – 8 Glenelg	Glenelg	Brighton	Glenelg 18 – 15 Wilderness (ET)
2008	Woodville	Glenelg	Brighton 16 – 19 Woodville	Brighton	Brighton	Brighton 25 – 8 Wilderness
2009	Brighton	Brighton	Brighton 21 – 10 Woodville	Brighton	Brighton	Brighton 14 – 10 Burnside
2010	Glenelg	Brighton	Brighton 10 – 16 Glenelg	Brighton	Brighton	Brighton 23 – 8 Glenelg
2011	Brighton	Brighton	Brighton 24 – 9 Glenelg	Brighton	Brighton	Brighton 15 – 6 Glenelg
2012	Brighton	Brighton	Brighton 18 – 13 Glenelg	Brighton	Brighton	Brighton 13 – 10 Wilderness
2013	Brighton	Brighton	Brighton 12 – 10 Glenelg	Brighton	Brighton	Brighton 13 – 8 Glenelg
2014	Glenelg	Brighton	Brighton 11 – 13 Glenelg	Wilderness	Brighton	Brighton 11 – 17 Wilderness
2015	Brighton	Brighton	Brighton 15 – 10 Burnside	Glenelg	Glenelg	Glenelg 20 – 7 Brighton
2016	Brighton	Glenelg	Brighton 9 – 3 ETP	Brighton	Brighton	Brighton 13 – 8 Glenelg
2017	Glenelg	Glenelg	Glenelg 15 – 10 Brighton	Glenelg	Glenelg	Glenelg 17 – 6 Brighton
2018	Glenelg	Glenelg	Glenelg 12 – 4 Burnside	Brighton	Woodville	Brighton 10 – 9 Woodville
2019	Burnside	Brighton	Burnside 13 – 6 Brighton	Brighton	Brighton	Glenelg 6 – 8 Brighton
2020	Brighton	Glenelg	Glenelg 8 – 11 Brighton	Brighton	Brighton	Brighton 10 – 7 Glenelg
2021	Glenelg	Glenelg	Brighton 8 – 11 Glenelg	Brighton	Brighton	Brighton 11 – 5 Glenelg
2022	Brighton	Brighton	Brighton 10 – 8 Glenelg	Brighton	Brighton	Brighton 6 – 4 Glenelg
2023	North Eagles	Brighton	Brighton 8 – 17 North Eagles	Brighton	Brighton	Brighton 9 – 7 Glenelg
2024	Brighton	Glenelg	Brighton 9 – 6 Glenelg	Brighton	Brighton	Brighton 6 – 4 Woodville
2025	Glenelg	Glenelg	Glenelg 13 – 10 Brighton	Brighton	Brighton	Brighton 10 – 7 Woodville
2026	Glenelg	Glenelg	Glenelg 13 – 12 Brighton (OT)	Brighton	Brighton	Brighton 14 – 6 Woodville

* Unofficial competition – South Australian Lacrosse Association not formed until 1888

† Unofficial competition – South Australian Lacrosse Association in recess during height of Second World War

== Premierships by Club ==
Club	Men's	Most Recent	Women's	Most Recent
Brighton	29	2024	21	2026
Glenelg	14	2026	14	2017
Sturt	23	2003	0	n/a
East Torrens Payneham^{‡4}	17	1983	0	n/a
Woodville / Port Adelaide	15	2008	0	n/a
Seacombe*	0	n/a	13	1984
Adelaide University^{‡3}	11	1975	1	1989
North Adelaide^{‡2} ^{‡6}	10	2023	0	n/a
UniSA / College / CAE*	0	n/a	9	1994
Eagles / West Torrens^{‡5} ^{‡6}	7	2023	0	n/a
Iroquois*	5	1901	0	n/a
Brighton High School*	0	n/a	2	1963
Plympton / Plymptonians*	0	n/a	2	1971
Wilderness	0	n/a	2	2014
Burnside	1	2019	1	1988
Goodwood*	1	1926	0	n/a
Adelaide*^{‡1}	0	n/a	0	n/a

* defunct club

‡1 does not include 2 unofficial men's premierships before formation of SA Lacrosse Association

‡2 does not include 1 unofficial men's premiership before formation of SA Lacrosse Association

‡3 does not include 2 unofficial men's premierships during Second World War

‡4 does not include 1 unofficial men's premiership during Second World War

‡5 does not include 1 unofficial men's premiership during Second World War

‡6 includes men's premiership shared between North Adelaide LC and West Torrens Eagles LC played as 'North Eagles' in 2023

== See also ==
- Lacrosse in Australia
