= Adelaide University Lacrosse Club =

Australian lacrosse club founded in 1889

Adelaide University Lacrosse Club Inc.
Founded	1889
Home ground	Park 10 North Adelaide
Colours	Black
President	Bridget Coffey
Men's Coach	Oliver Lovat
Women's Coach	Peterson Jacob Coates
Affiliations	Lacrosse SA, Adelaide Uni Sports Assoc

The Adelaide University Lacrosse Club (AULC) is an Australian-based lacrosse club founded in 1889 by Nobel Prize winning Professor William Henry Bragg. It is one of the oldest lacrosse clubs in Australia and is a founding member of the Adelaide University Sports Association. The AULC takes part in an annual competition against the Melbourne University Lacrosse Club that was first contested in 1905 and competes locally in the Lacrosse South Australia competition. Club membership is focused on University of Adelaide students and graduates. Other non-students are also members. The AULC trains on the University of Adelaide's Park 10 sports fields in the park lands between the University campus and North Adelaide.

== Rhodes Scholars ==
Seven Rhodes Scholars have been members of AULC:

- 1909 Henry Fry, anthropologist and medical practitioner.
- 1917 Sir Hugh William Bell Cairns, neurosurgeon.
- 1925 Myles Landseer Formby, World War II surgeon.
- 1939 Duncan Campbell Menzies, army officer. Died after being tortured by the Japanese in Burma whilst on patrol with the Chindits during World War II.
- 1955 Ian Wilson, politician and lawyer.
- 1976 Mark Rogers Mussared, engineer.
- 1983 David Alexander C Robertson

== Other Players of Note ==
- Arthur Blackburn, recipient of the Victoria Cross awarded for Gallantry at the Battle of Pozières

== University Blues ==
An Adelaide University Blue is awarded for excellence in a particular sport. The awarding of a Blue is usually for competing in a state or national team. The AULC has 134 full Blues awarded to members since 1908. Many more half blues and club letters have also been awarded.

== A Grade Premierships ==
The AULC has won 11 men's and 1 women's A grade premierships since 1890.
