= List of Australian Lacrosse national champions =

This is a list of Australian Lacrosse national champions.

== Trophy ==
Men's National Champions: Garland McHarg Trophy

Women's National Champions: Joy Parker Cup

== Champions ==
| Year | Men | | Women | |
| Year | Champion | Venue | Champion | Venue |
|---|---|---|---|---|
| 1910 | Victoria | Adelaide | no competition | |
| 1912 | Victoria | Melbourne | no competition | |
| 1920 | South Australia | Sydney | no competition | |
| 1923 | South Australia | Brisbane | no competition | |
| 1926 | South Australia | Adelaide | no competition | |
| 1929 | Victoria | Perth | no competition | |
| 1932 | Victoria | Melbourne | no competition | |
| 1936 | Victoria | Adelaide | no competition | |
| 1939 | Victoria | Brisbane | no competition | |
| 1947 | Western Australia | Perth | no competition | |
| 1950 | Victoria | Melbourne | no competition | |
| 1953 | Victoria | Adelaide | no competition | |
| 1956 | Victoria | Perth | no competition | |
| 1959 | South Australia | Melbourne | no competition | |
| 1962 | South Australia | Adelaide | Victoria | |
| 1963 | no competition | | South Australia | |
| 1964 | no competition | | South Australia | |
| 1965 | Victoria | Perth | South Australia | Perth |
| 1966 | no competition | | Victoria | |
| 1967 | no competition | | South Australia | |
| 1968 | Victoria | Melbourne | Victoria | |
| 1969 | no competition | | Victoria | |
| 1970 | Victoria | Adelaide | South Australia | |
| 1971 | no competition | | South Australia | |
| 1972 | Western Australia | Perth | Victoria | |
| 1973 | no competition | | South Australia | |
| 1974 | Victoria | Melbourne | Victoria | |
| 1975 | no competition | | South Australia | |
| 1976 | South Australia | Adelaide | South Australia | |
| 1977 | South Australia | Perth | Victoria | |
| 1978 | no competition | | Western Australia | Perth |
| 1979 | Victoria | Melbourne | South Australia | Hobart |
| 1980 | no competition | | Western Australia | Melbourne |
| 1981 | Western Australia | Adelaide | Victoria | Perth |
| 1982 | Western Australia | Perth | South Australia | Adelaide |
| 1983 | South Australia | Melbourne | Victoria | Hobart |
| 1984 | Western Australia | Adelaide | Western Australia | Perth |
| 1985 | Western Australia | Perth | South Australia | Melbourne |
| 1986 | Victoria | Adelaide | South Australia | Adelaide |
| 1987 | Victoria | Melbourne | South Australia | Hobart |
| 1988 | Western Australia | Adelaide | South Australia | Perth |
| 1989 | Western Australia | Melbourne | South Australia | Melbourne |
| 1990 | Western Australia | Perth | South Australia | Adelaide |
| 1991 | Western Australia | Adelaide | South Australia | Melbourne |
| 1992 | Victoria | Melbourne | South Australia | Perth |
| 1993 | Western Australia | Perth | South Australia | Melbourne |
| 1994 | Victoria | Adelaide | South Australia | Adelaide |
| 1995 | Western Australia | Melbourne | South Australia | Melbourne |
| 1996 | Western Australia | Perth | Victoria | Perth |
| 1997 | Victoria | Adelaide | South Australia | Adelaide |
| 1998 | Victoria | Melbourne | Victoria | Melbourne |
| 1999 | Victoria | Adelaide | South Australia | Sydney |
| 2000 | Western Australia | Perth | South Australia | Hobart |
| 2001 | South Australia | Melbourne | South Australia | Perth |
| 2002 | South Australia | Perth | South Australia | Adelaide |
| 2003 | South Australia | Adelaide | South Australia | Melbourne |
| 2004 | Victoria | Melbourne* | South Australia | Sydney |
| 2005 | Victoria | Adelaide* | South Australia | Adelaide |
| 2006 | Western Australia | Perth* | no competition | |
| 2007 | Victoria | Melbourne* | South Australia | Sydney |
| 2008 | Victoria | Perth | Victoria | Perth |
| 2009 | Victoria | Adelaide | Victoria | Melbourne |
| 2010 | Victoria | Melbourne | South Australia | Melbourne |
| 2011 | Victoria | Adelaide | Western Australia | Adelaide |
| 2012 | South Australia | Perth | Western Australia | Perth |
| 2013 | Western Australia | Melbourne | Victoria | Melbourne |
| 2014 | South Australia | Adelaide | Victoria | Adelaide |
| 2015 | Western Australia | Perth | Victoria | Perth |
| 2016 | Victoria | Melbourne | Victoria | Melbourne |
| 2017 | Victoria | Adelaide | Victoria | Adelaide |
| 2018 | Victoria | Perth | Western Australia | Perth |
| 2019 | Victoria | Melbourne | Victoria | Melbourne |
| 2020 | no competition – COVID-19 pandemic | | | |
| 2021 | no competition – COVID-19 pandemic | | | |
| 2022 | Victoria | Melbourne | Victoria | Melbourne |
| 2023 | South Australia | Adelaide | South Australia | Adelaide |
| 2024 | Western Australia | Perth | Western Australia | Perth |
| 2025 | Victoria | Melbourne | South Australia | Melbourne |
| 2026 | South Australia | Adelaide | Victoria | Adelaide |

* For the Australian Lacrosse League that ran from 2004 to 2007, the venue refers to that of the championship game

Total Championships:

- Men's
  1. Victoria: 34
  2. Western Australia: 18
  3. South Australia: 15
- Women's
  1. South Australia: 34
  2. Victoria: 21
  3. Western Australia: 7

== See also ==
- Lacrosse in Australia
- Lacrosse Australia
