= Lacrosse Australia =

Governing body for the sport of Lacrosse in Australia

- Sport: Lacrosse
- Jurisdiction: Australia
- Abbreviation: LA
- Founded: 2008 (ALC 1931 and AWLC 1962)
- Affiliation: World Lacrosse
- Affiliation date: 1974
- Regional affiliation: Asia Pacific Lacrosse Union
- Headquarters: Melbourne, Victoria
- Chairperson: Abbie Burgess-Brice
- CEO: Anna Carroll

Official website
- www.lacrosse.com.au
- (Australia)

Lacrosse Australia (LA) is the governing body for the sport of Lacrosse in Australia.

== History ==
Lacrosse in Australia has a rich and celebrated history, and can trace its beginnings back to a letter to the editor that was sent from Lambton Mount to The Australasian newspaper and published on 8 April 1876. In his letter, Mount announced that he was calling a meeting the following week with respect to the formation of the "Melbourne La Crosse Club", and four days later, the club was formed.

Lacrosse soon spread around the continent, and by the time of federation in 1901, lacrosse was being played in every state in Australia.

Proposals for a national governing body for lacrosse were reported as early as 1903, with the Australasian Lacrosse Union formed after the national Lacrosse Conference in 1904, however disagreements between member associations led to its demise by 1908.

The need for a national body persisted, and while discussions of forming one were reported in 1923, it took eight more years before the Australian Lacrosse Council was finally formed.

The Australian Women's Lacrosse Council was formed in 1962 soon after women's lacrosse had been restarted in Victoria and South Australia.

Up until 2007, men's and women's lacrosse in Australia were administered by separate governing bodies: Lacrosse Australia (originally the Australian Lacrosse Council) and Women's Lacrosse Australia (Australian Women's Lacrosse Council). These organisations merged in 2008 to form the Australian Lacrosse Association (ALA). In 2021, the ALA rebranded as Lacrosse Australia and remains the single governing body for all formats of lacrosse in Australia.

== See also ==
- Lacrosse in Australia
- List of Australian Lacrosse national champions
- Australia men's national lacrosse team
- Australia women's national lacrosse team
- Australia national indoor lacrosse team
