= Definitions of Japanese war crimes =

Japanese war crimes

There are differences from one country to another regarding the definition of Japanese war crimes. War crimes have been broadly defined as violations of the laws or customs of war, which involves acts using prohibited weapons, violating battlefield norms while engaging in combat with the enemy combatants, or against protected persons, including enemy civilians and citizens and property of neutral states as in the case of the attack on Pearl Harbor. Military personnel from the Empire of Japan have been accused and/or convicted of committing many such acts during the period of Japanese imperialism from the late 19th to mid-20th centuries. They have been accused of conducting a series of human rights abuses against civilians and prisoners of war (POWs) throughout east Asia and the western Pacific region. These events reached their height during the Second Sino-Japanese War of 1937–45 and the Asian and Pacific campaigns of World War II (1941–45).

In Japan itself, the description of particular events as war crimes — and specific details of these events — are often disputed by Japanese nationalists, such as Tsukurukai (Society for History Textbook Reform). Such organisations and their activities are a subject of controversy and are alleged to be examples of historical revisionism.

== International law ==
Although the 1929 Geneva Convention on Prisoners of War provided the regulations how prisoners of war should be treated, the Empire of Japan never signed the agreement (except the 1929 Geneva Convention on the Sick and Wounded). However, many of the alleged crimes committed by imperial personnel were also violations of the Japanese code of military law, which Japanese authorities either ignored or failed to enforce. The empire also violated provisions of the Treaty of Versailles, such as article 171, which outlawed the use of poison gas (chemical weapons), and other international agreements signed by Japan, such as the Hague Conventions of 1899 and 1907, which protect prisoners of war (POWs). According to historian Akira Fujiwara, Hirohito personally ratified on 5 August 1937 a proposition by his Army chief of staff, Prince Kan'in Kotohito, to remove the constraint of those conventions on the treatment of Chinese prisoners.

=== Japan and international treaties ===
In Japan, the term "Japanese war crimes" generally refers to cases tried by the International Military Tribunal for the Far East, also known as the Tokyo Trials, following the end of the Pacific War. The tribunal did not prosecute war crimes allegations involving mid-ranking officers or more junior personnel. Those were dealt with separately in other cities throughout the Asia-Pacific region.

The Japanese government said that Japan was not a signatory to the 1929 Geneva Convention on Prisoners of War, although it was the signatory of the 1907 Hague Convention, which provided humane treatment of prisoners of war (POWs), and the 1929 Geneva Convention on the Sick and Wounded Armed Forces in the Field, which provided humane treatment for enemy combatants who were injured, sick, or otherwise disabled on the battlefield. It also signed the Kellogg-Briand Pact in 1929, thereby rendering its actions in 1937–45 liable to charges of crimes against peace, a charge which was introduced at the Tokyo Trials to prosecute Class-A War Criminals. (Class-B War Criminals are those found guilty of war crimes per se, and Class-C War Criminals are those guilty of crimes against humanity.) However, any convictions for such crimes are not required to be recognized by the Japanese government, as the Kellogg-Briand Pact did not have an enforcement clause stipulating penalties in the event of violation.

The Japanese government accepted the terms set by the Potsdam Declaration (1945) after the end of the war. The declaration alluded, in Article 10, to two kinds of war crime: one was the violation of international laws, such as the abuse of prisoners of war (POWs); the other was obstructing "democratic tendencies among the Japanese people" and civil liberties within Japan.

=== Japanese law ===
Japanese law does not recognize those convicted in the Tokyo Trials and other trials as criminals, because Japan's governments 'merely' accepted the judgments made in the trials and in the Treaty of San Francisco (1952) (in the Japanese text, the word used is judaku, for "accept", as opposed to the stronger shounin, "to approve"). This has been framed as a detriment to the legal validity of the Allied tribunals. Furthermore, those convicted have had no ability to appeal under Japanese law, as the Tokyo Tribunal and other war crimes courts have no standing in Japan. Because of these aspects, it has been argued that, at least under normal circumstances, this would possibly violate a number of fundamental legal principles (in particular not to punish someone whose crime and penalty were defined only after the fact).

Given these discrepancies, Japanese courts might have reversed the verdicts had Japan certified the legal validity of the war crimes tribunals in the San Francisco Treaty (thus possibly enabling the Japanese courts to have any jurisdiction in these cases). Any such outcomes would have created domestic and international political and diplomatic crises.

== International definitions ==
Outside Japan, different societies use widely different timeframes in defining Japanese war crimes. For example, the annexation of Korea by Japan in 1910 was followed by the abolition of the traditional class system by Joseon and modernization against the Korean people. Thus, some Koreans refer to "Japanese war crimes" as events occurring during the period shortly prior to 1910 to 1945. Events such as the March 1st movement where 7,000 people were killed and the murder of Empress Myeongseong are considered war crimes in Korea. By comparison, the United States did not come into military conflict with Japan until 1941, and thus Americans may consider "Japanese war crimes" as encompassing only those events that occurred from 1941 to 1945.

A complicating factor is that a minority of people in every Asian and Pacific country invaded by Japan collaborated with the Japanese military, or even served in it, for a wide variety of reasons, such as economic hardship, coercion, or antipathy to other imperialist powers. Many Koreans served in the Imperial armed forces. The Formosan Army, which was part of the Imperial Japanese Army, was recruited from ethnic Chinese men on Formosa. The Indian National Army, under Subhas Chandra Bose, is perhaps the best-known example of a movement opposed to European imperialism, which was formed during World War II to assist the Japanese military. Prominent individual nationalists in other countries, such as the later Indonesian president, Suharto, also served with Japanese imperial forces. The Burmese nationalist leader Aung San initially sided with the Japanese, forming the Burma National Army, but turned against them in early 1945. In some cases such non-Japanese personnel were also responsible for war crimes committed by the Empire of Japan. B. V. A. Roling, the Dutch justice at the Tokyo trials, noted how "many of the commanders and guards in POW camps were Koreans [as] the Japanese apparently did not trust them as soldiers." Korean guards, he added, were often said to be "far more cruel than the Japanese." One Korean described abject Allied POWs: "now I have seen how depraved and worthless the white man is." For political reasons, many non-Japanese personnel in the Imperial armed forces were never investigated or tried after 1945. In South Korea especially, it is alleged that such people were often able to acquire wealth by participating in exploitative activities with the Japanese military. It is further alleged in South Korea that some former collaborators have covered up "Japanese" war crimes in order to avoid their own prosecution and/or exposure.

It was widely agreed that acts committed by Japan against people subject to its sovereignty in the context of civil wars (such as the 1930 Musha Incident) and interstate conflicts between 1895 and 1945 were not war crimes, because international humanitarian law did not have any rules in place for the former during these years and only stipulates the protection of enemy and neutral nationals in the latter. The issue of Japan's de facto or de jure sovereignty over places such as Ryukyu (1879–1945) (Note: e.g., Ryukyuan civilians were massacred or massively forced to kill themselves or each other by the Japanese military during the Battle of Okinawa.), Taiwan (1895–1945), and Korea (1910–1945) prior to 1945, is a matter of controversy. Japanese control was accepted and recognized internationally and was justified by instruments such as the Treaty of Shimonoseki (1895, which included China's cession of Taiwan) and the Japan–Korea Annexation Treaty (1910). The legality of the Japan–Korea Annexation Treaty, in particular, is in question because it was not signed by the Korean head of state; it was signed by government ministers. The native populations were not consulted on the changes in sovereignty and there was ongoing resistance to Japanese rule; under current international law, the subjects can considered to be under belligerent military occupation in which the rules applicable to interstate conflicts apply (see Korea under Japanese rule and Taiwan under Japanese rule for further details).
