= National Jewish Sports Hall of Fame and Museum =

Sports hall of fame in New York, USA

Coordinates: 40°49′45.19″N 73°18′12.03″W

- Formation: March 21, 1993; 33 years ago
- Type: Hall of Fame
- Headquarters: Commack, New York
- Region served: United States
- Chairperson: Jason Bartow
- Website: nationaljewishsportshalloffame.org

The National Jewish Sports Hall of Fame and Museum, in Commack, New York, is dedicated to honoring American Jewish figures who have distinguished themselves in sports.

Its objective is to foster Jewish identity through athletics, and to commemorate sports heroes who have emerged from a people not commonly associated with sports.

The Hall has inductees in the sports of American football, auto-racing, baseball, basketball, bicycling, bowling, boxing, Canadian football, canoeing, cycling, discus, dressage, fencing, figure skating, golf, gymnastics, handball, horse showing, horse-racing, ice hockey, judo, karate, lacrosse, marathon running, pole vault, racquetball, rowing, rugby, shot put, skiing, soccer (European football), softball, squash, swimming, tennis, track, triathlete, volleyball, weightlifting, and wrestling. It has also inducted authors, broadcasters, columnists, and sportscasters.

The Hall of Fame and Museum is located at the Suffolk Jewish Community Center in Commack, New York.

== Inductees ==
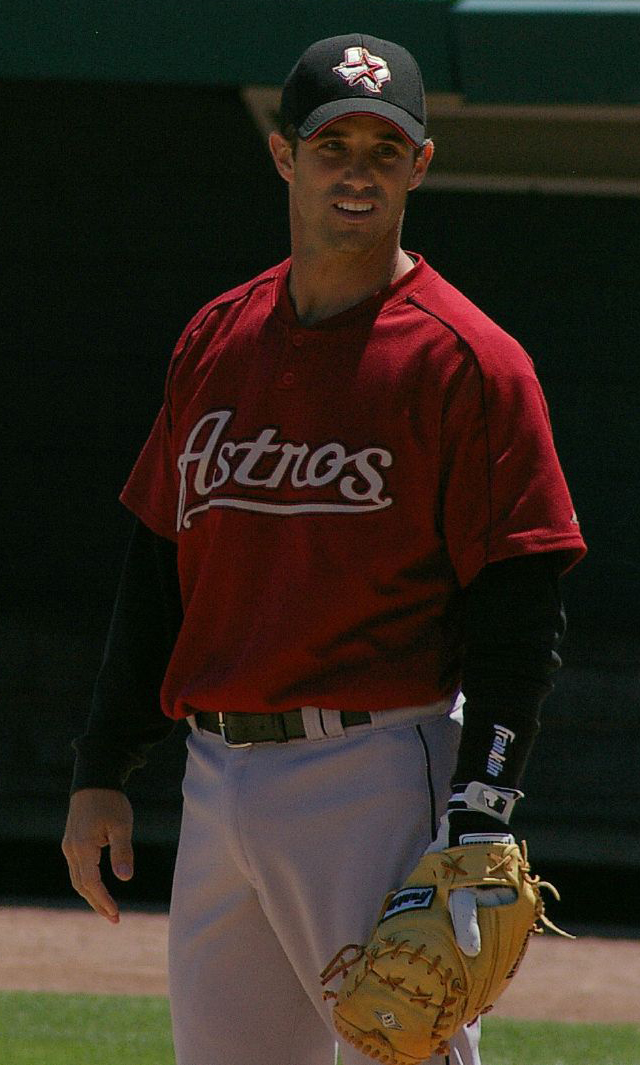
Brad Ausmus, All Star and Gold Glove catcher

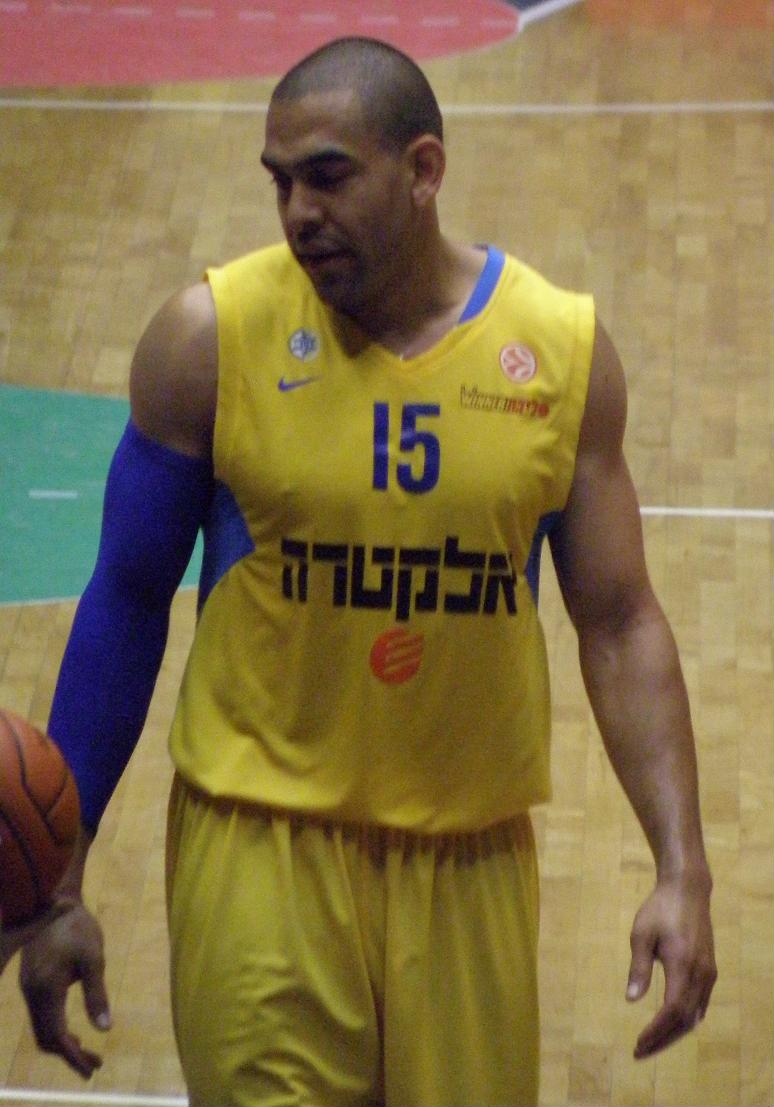
David Blu

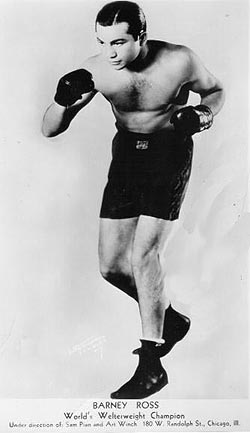
Barney Ross

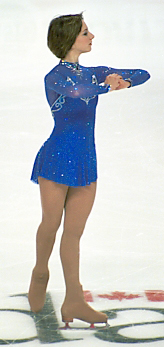
Sarah Hughes

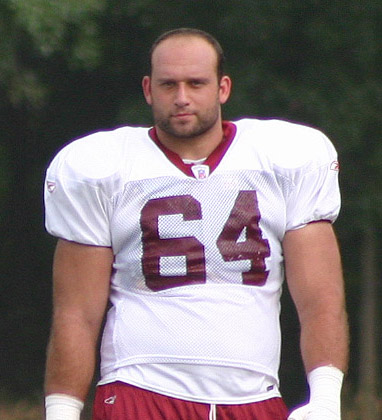
Lennie Friedman

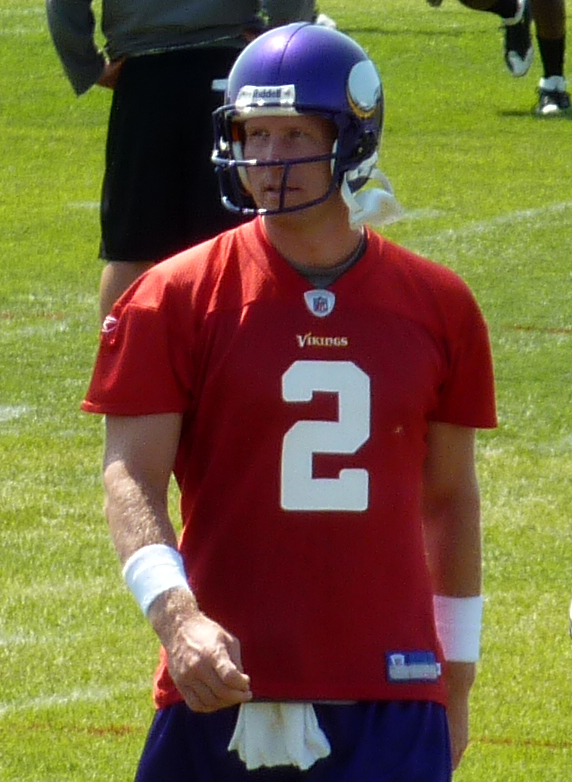
Sage Rosenfels

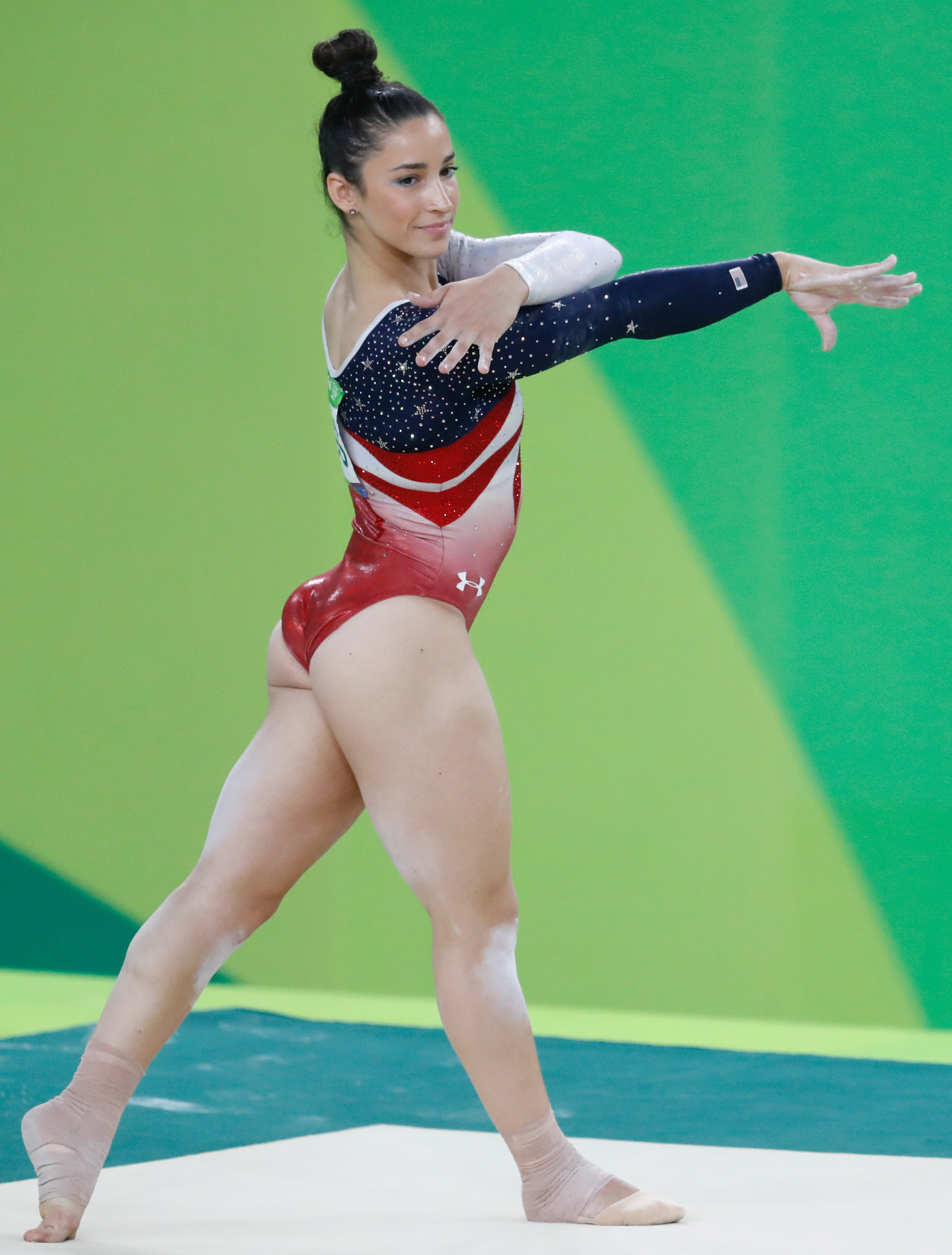
Aly Raisman

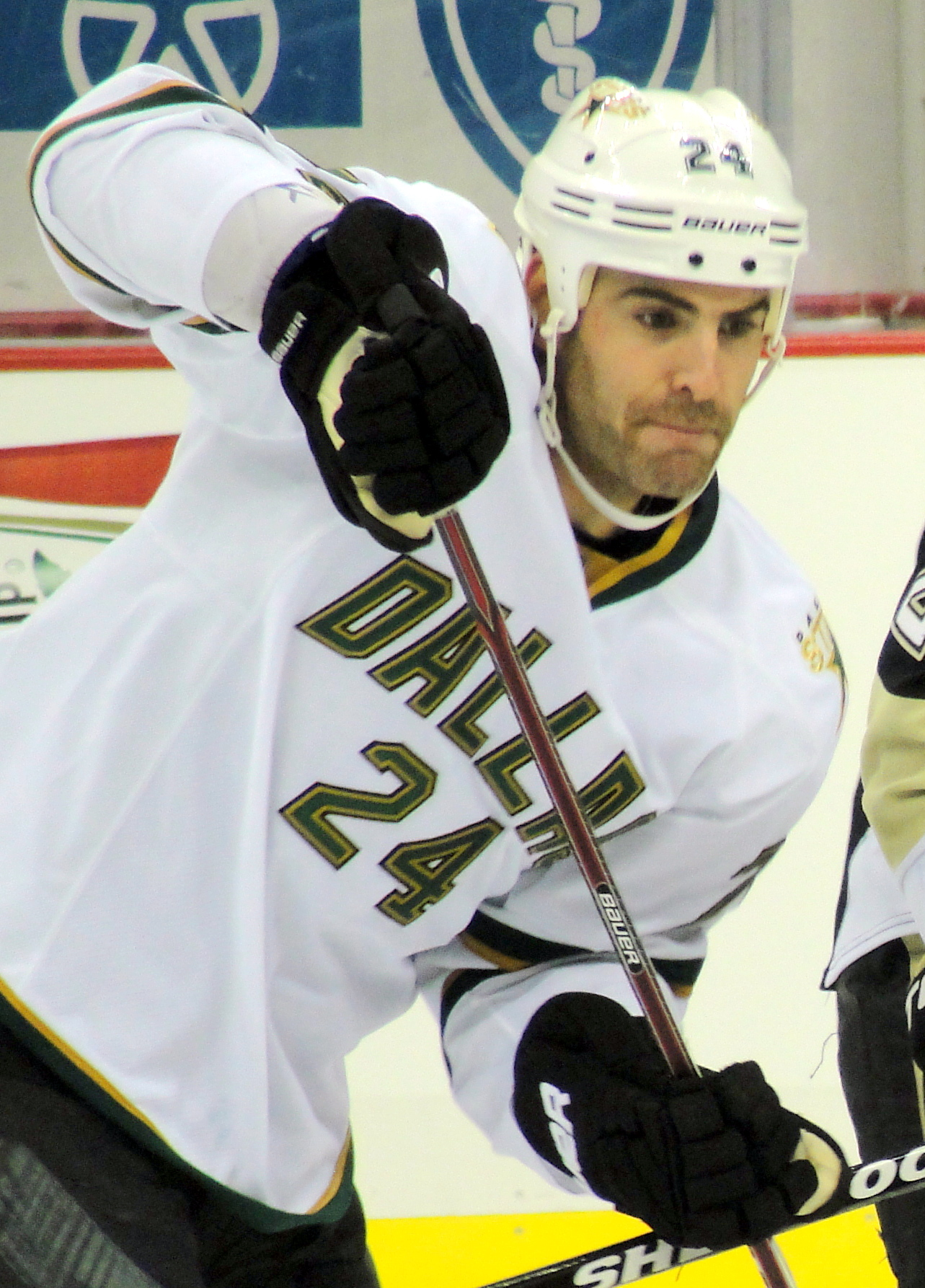
Eric Nystrom

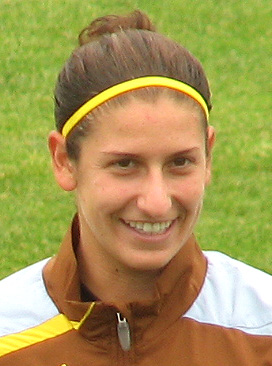
Yael Averbuch

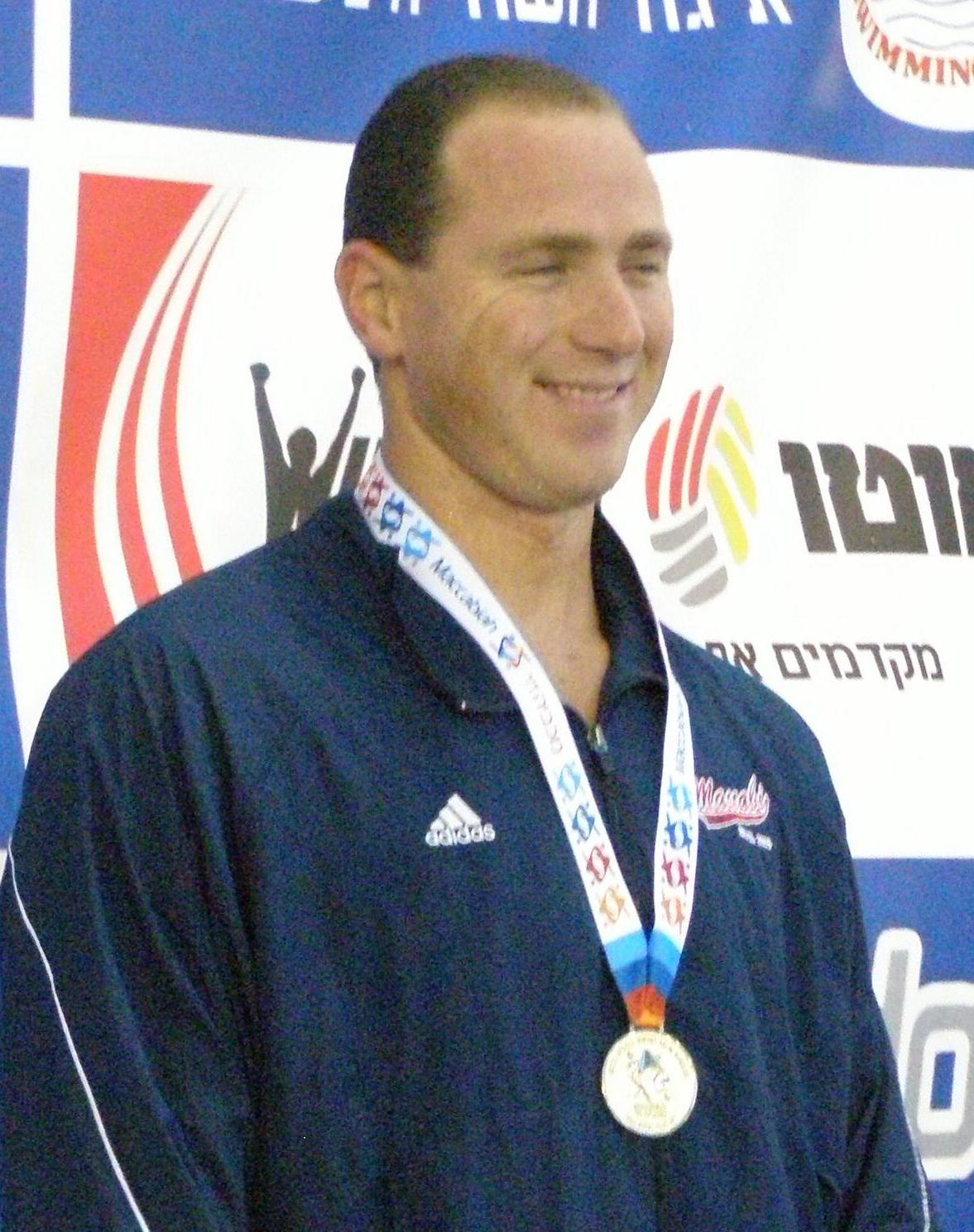
Jason Lezak

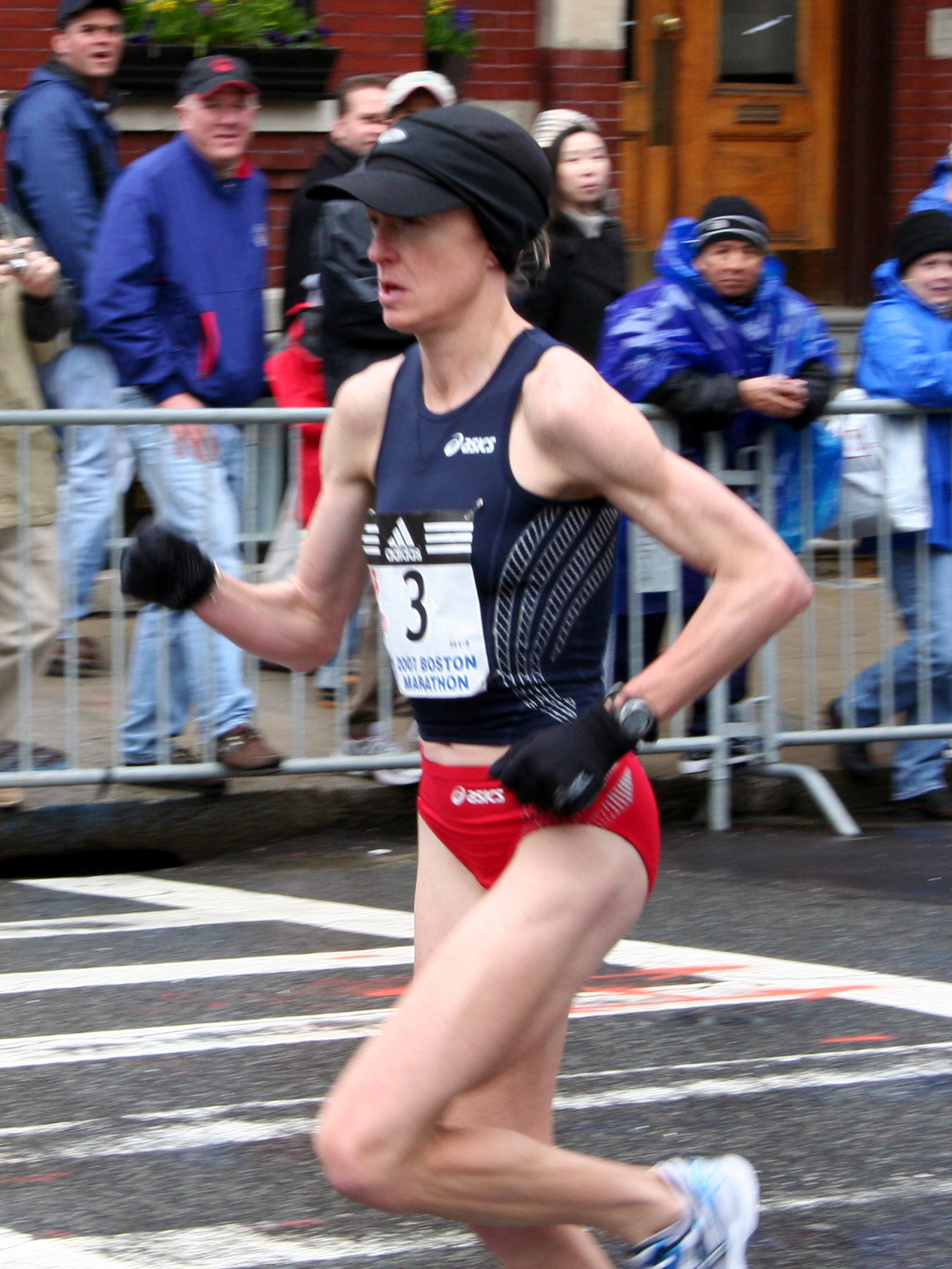
Deena Kastor

Name	Induction Year	Sport	Notes
Art Heyman	1993	Basketball	
Ernie Grunfeld	1993	Basketball	
Henry Wittenberg	1993	Wrestling	
Marv Albert	1993	Broadcasting	
Max Zaslofsky	1993	Basketball	
Red Holzman	1993	Basketball	Basketball coach
Sandy Koufax	1993	Baseball	
Shep Messing	1993	Soccer	
Art Shamsky	1994	Baseball	
Gary Bettman	1994	Ice Hockey	NHL commissioner
Larry Brown	1994	Basketball	Basketball coach
Marty Glickman	1994	Broadcasting	
Sid Tanenbaum	1994	Basketball	
Allie Sherman	1995	Football	
Dolph Schayes	1995	Basketball	
Fred Lebow	1995	Marathon Running	NYC marathon founder
Hank Greenberg	1995	Baseball	
Margaret Lambert	1995	Track and Field	
Mel Allen	1995	Broadcasting	
Nat Holman	1995	Basketball	
Sid Luckman	1995	Football	
William Beroza	1995	Lacrosse	
Benny Leonard	1996	Boxing	
Gary Wood	1996	Football	
Milton Richman	1996	Columnist	
Moe Berg	1996	Baseball	
Red Auerbach	1996	Basketball	Basketball coach
Barney Ross	1997	Boxing	
Bill Mazer	1997	Broadcasting	
Marilyn Fierro	1997	Karate	
Red Sarachek	1997	Basketball	Basketball coach
Al Rosen	1998	Baseball	
Danny Schayes	1998	Basketball	
Dick Savitt	1998	Tennis	
Irving Mondschein	1998	Track and Field	
Norm Drucker	1998	Basketball	Basketball official
Ossie Schectman	1998	Basketball	
Saul Rogovin	1998	Baseball	
Vic Hershkowitz	1998	Handball	
Doug Shapiro	1999	Cycling	
Ed Newman	1999	Football	
Harry Danning	1999	Baseball	
Ken Holtzman	1999	Baseball	
Ray Arcel	1999	Boxing	Boxing trainer
Warner Wolf	1999	Broadcasting	
Julie Heldman	2000	Tennis	
Gary Wichard	2001	Football	Football player & sports agent
Len Berman	2001	Broadcasting	
Andy Bloom	2001	Track and Field	
Anthony Ervin	2001	Swimming	
Cliff Bayer	2001	Fencing	
Deena Kastor	2001	Track and Field	
Jason Lezak	2001	Swimming	
Margie Goldstein-Engle	2001	Horse Showing	
Nicole Freedman	2001	Bicycling	
Robert Dover	2001	Dressage	
Sage Rosenfels	2001	Football	
Sara Whalen	2001	Soccer	
Scott Goldblatt	2001	Swimming	
Tamir Bloom	2001	Fencing	
Marv Levy	2002	Football	Football coach & executive
Sid Gillman	2002	Football	
Steve Nisenson	2002	Basketball	
Walter Blum	2002	Horseracing	
Jay Fiedler	2002	Football	
Debbie Rademacher	2003	Soccer	
Marilyn Ramenofsky	2003	Swimming	
Zhanna Pintusevich-Block	2003	Track and Field	
Amy Alcott	2003	Golf	
Helene Hines	2003	Marathon Running	
Sara Whalen	2003	Soccer	
Sarah Hughes	2003	Figure Skating	
Suzyn Waldman	2003	Sportscaster	
Aerial Gilbert	2004	Rowing	
Al Blau	2004	Lacrosse	Lacrosse official
Benny Friedman	2004	Football	
Brad Ausmus	2004	Baseball	
Elliott Maddox	2004	Baseball	
Jack Garfinkel	2004	Basketball	
Mike Epstein	2004	Baseball	
Ron Blomberg	2004	Baseball	
Shawn Lipman	2004	Rugby	
Sid Gordon	2004	Baseball	
Thelma Eisen	2004	Baseball	
Abe Saperstein	2005	Basketball	Basketball owner & coach
Bob Stein	2005	Football	
Gladys Heldman	2005	Tennis	Women's tennis magazine founder
Isaac Berger	2005	Weightlifting	
Jay Fiedler	2005	Football	
Joe Jacobi	2005	Canoeing	
Julie Heldman	2005	Tennis	
Marty Hogan	2005	Racquetball	
Mitch Gaylord	2005	Gymnastics	
Ryan Levinson	2005	Cycling	
Shawn Green	2005	Baseball	
Shirley Povich	2005	Columnist	
Bob Berland	2006	Judo	
Carrie Sheinberg	2006	Skiing	
Donna Orender	2006	Basketball	
Herb Brown	2006	Basketball	Basketball coach
Ilana Kloss	2006	Tennis	
Jeff Agoos	2006	Soccer	
John Frank	2006	Football	
Neal Walk	2006	Basketball	
Roger Kahn	2006		Sportswriter; author of The Boys of Summer
Bonnie Bernstein	2007	Broadcasting	
Craig Ludin	2007	Special Olympics	
Dan Lurie	2007	Body Building	
Deena Kastor	2007	Marathon Running	
Dwight Stones	2007	Track and Field	
George Kalinsky	2007	Photography	
Harry Haft	2007	Boxing	
Howard Cosell	2007	Broadcasting	
Jerry Markbreit	2007	Referee	Football referee
Lennie Rosenbluth	2007	Basketball	
Mark Spitz	2007	Swimming	
Mitchell Bobrow	2007	Karate / Taekwondo	
Senda Berenson Abbott	2007	Basketball	Women's basketball pioneer
Bruce Pearl	2008	Basketball	
Daniel Bukantz	2008	Fencing	
Hy Gotkin	2008	Basketball	
Kerri Strug	2008	Gymnastics	
Lenny Krayzelburg	2008	Swimming	
Ron Mix	2008	Football	
Sam Rosen	2008	Ice Hockey	
Tony Kornheiser	2008	Sportswriter	
Andre Tippett	2009	Football	
Dara Torres	2009	Swimming	
Dick Schaap	2009	Columnist	
Ed Block	2009	Football	
Gary Gubner	2009	Track and Field	
Linda Cohn	2009	Sportscaster	
Marvin Miller	2009	Executive	Baseball player association executive
Alan Veingrad	2010	Football	
Bill Goldberg	2010	Wrestling	
Dick Traum	2010	Track and Field	
Jason Lezak	2010	Swimming	
Russ Rose	2010	Volleyball	
Rena Kanokogi	2010	Judo	
Seth Greenberg	2010	Basketball	Basketball coach
Abe Pollin	2011	Executive	
Al Seiden	2011	Basketball	
Dick Steinberg	2011	Football	
Gabe Carimi	2011	Football	
Hal Richman	2011	Baseball	Creator of the Strat-O-Matic baseball simulation game
Harris Barton	2011	Football	
Jane Katz	2011	Professor	
Niv Sultan	2011	Football	
Steve Mesler	2011	Bobsled	
Tal Brody	2011	Basketball	
Al Davis	2012	Boxing	
Arthur Richman	2012	Media	
Debbie Rademacher	2012	Soccer	Soccer coach
Howie Rose	2012	Media	
Jerry Solomon	2012	Executive	
Joanna Zeiger	2012	Triathlete	
Jon Denning	2012	Auto Racing	
Mike Hartman	2012	Ice Hockey	
Sy Berger	2012	Executive	"Father of the modern baseball card" and Topps executive
Aly Raisman	2013	Gymnastics	
Andrew Bernstein	2013	Photography	
Ben Helfgott	2013	Weightlifting	
Boyd Melson	2013	Boxing	
Bruce Cohen	2013	Lacrosse	
Daniel Haber	2013	Soccer	
David Mark Berger	2013	Weightlifting	
David Mark Berger	2013	Photography	
Garrett Weber-Gale	2013	Swimming	
Jacqui Kalin	2013	Basketball	
James Metzger	2013	Executive	
Jennifer Horowitz	2013	Fencing	
Marilyn Ramenofsky	2013	Swimming	
Randy Grossman	2013	Football	
Richard Bernstein	2013	Disabled Runner	
Sammy Gross	2013	Wrestling	
Steve Bilsky	2013	Basketball	
Adam Greenberg	2014	Baseball	
Angela Buxton	2014	Tennis	
Don Goldstein	2014	Basketball	
Barry Kramer	2014	Basketball	
Jay Berger	2014	Tennis	
Joel Segal	2014	Football executive	NFL agent
Mark Roth	2014	Bowling	
Lenny Krayzelburg	2015	Swimming	
Wayne Goldstein	2015	Coaching	
Joel Cohen	2015	Sportswriter	
Lester Feuerstein	2015	Coaching	
Lenny Silberman	2015	Coaching	
No inductions were held between 2016 and 2022
Maxwell Jacob Friedman	2023	Professional Wrestling	
Munich Eleven: Ze'ev Friedman; Eliezer Halfin; Amitzur Shapira; Kehat Shorr; Mark Slavin; Andre Spitzer; Yakov Springer; David Berger; Yossef Romano; Yossef Gutfreund; Moshe Weinberg	2023	Olympics	Victims of the Munich Massacre
Mathieu Schneider	2024	Ice Hockey	
Jeff Bukantz	2024	Fencing	Coach of the US Olympic fencing team; two-time Olympic medalist
Lipman Pike	2024	Baseball	
Kenny Albert	2025	Broadcasting	
Aaron Krickstein	2025	Tennis	
Al Sloman	2025	Basketball	
Cletus Seldin	2026	Boxing	
Max Baer	2026	Boxing	
Kevin Pillar	2026	Baseball	
Max Rosenbloom	2026	Boxing	
Yuri Foreman	2026	Boxing	

== Awards ==
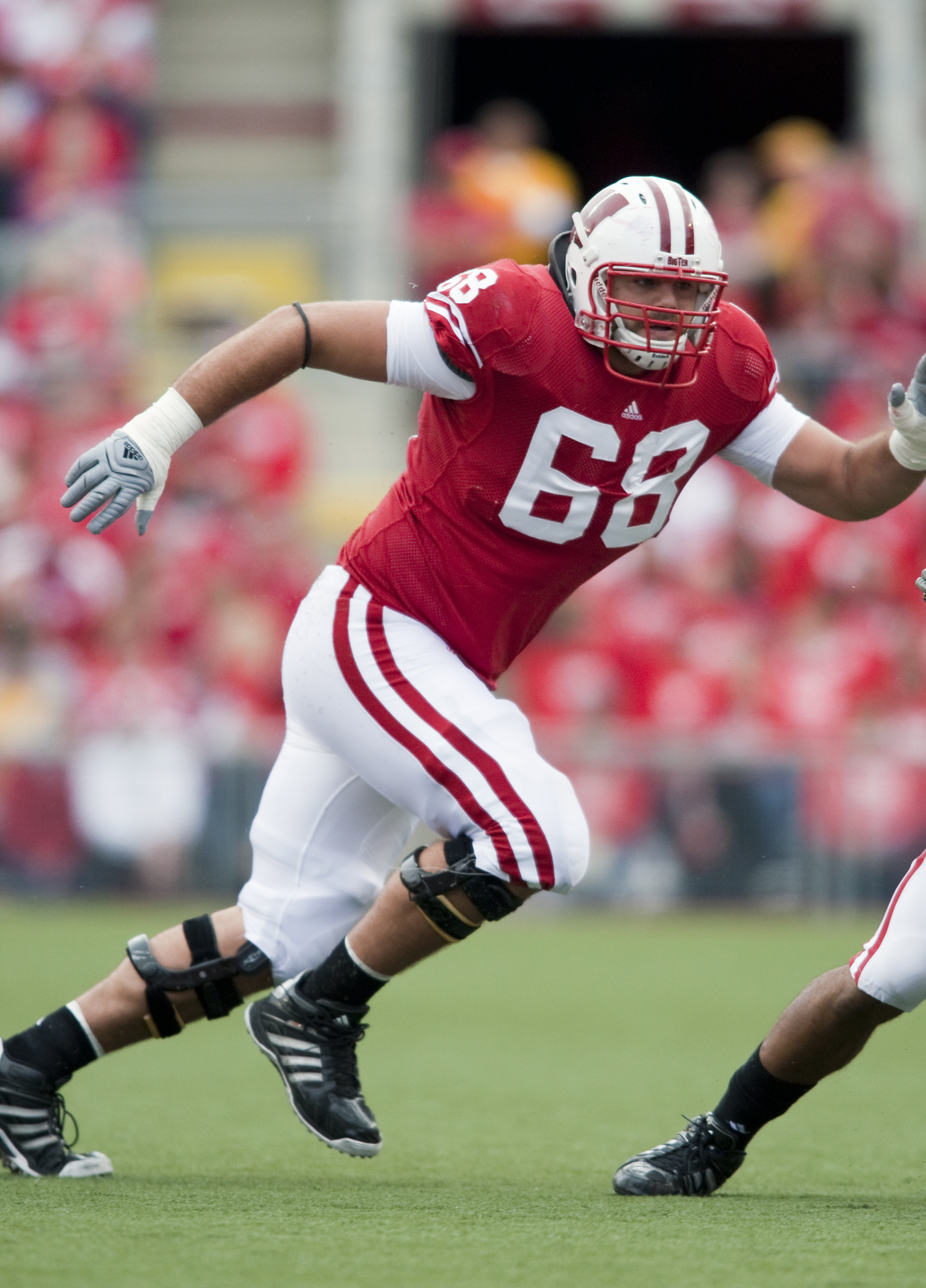
Gabe Carimi

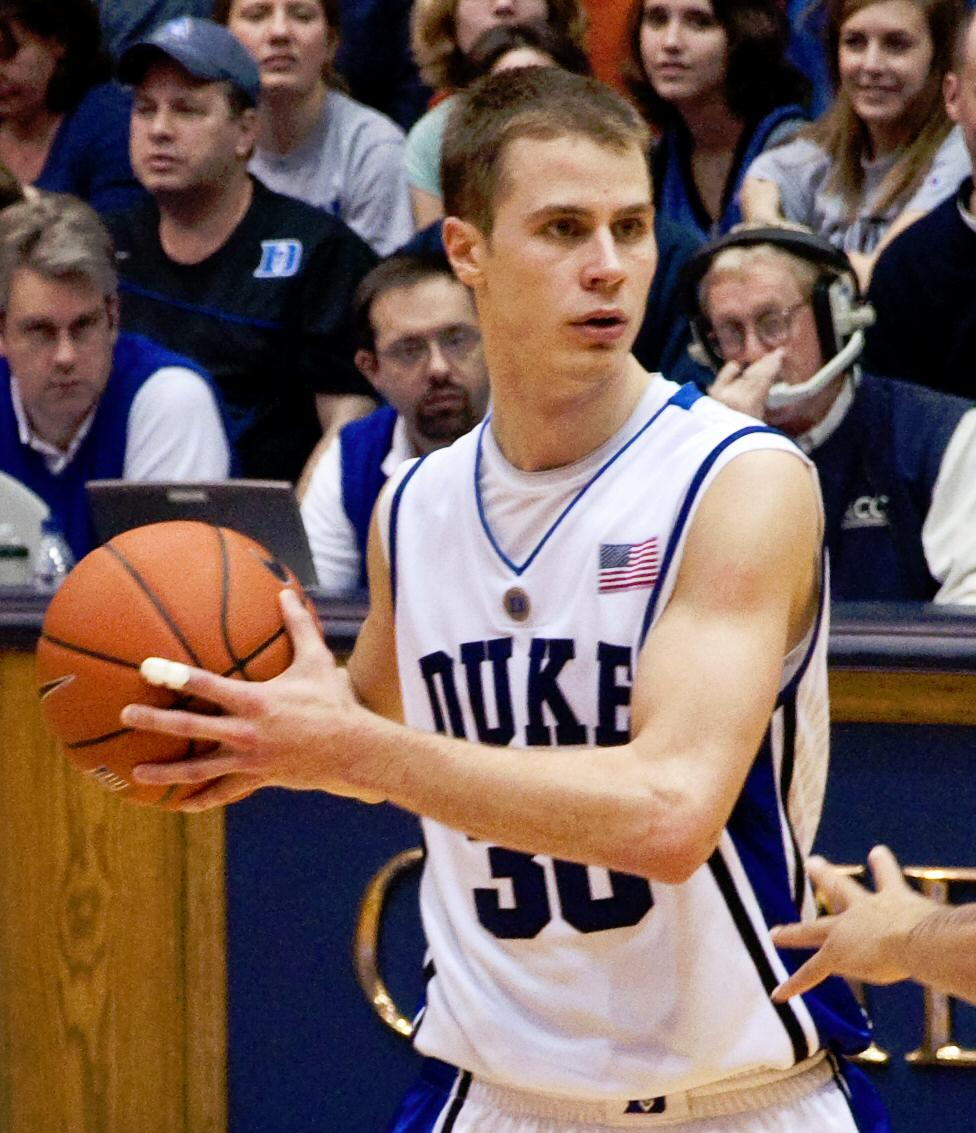
Jon Scheyer

In addition to inducted Hall of Fame members, it presents periodic awards as follows:

=== The Marty Glickman Outstanding Jewish (College) Scholastic Athlete of the Year ===
Awarded to Charles Altchek (soccer), Yael Averbuch (soccer), Cliff Bayer (fencing), Matt Bernstein (football), Shay Doron (basketball), Hayden Epstein (football), David Ettinger (football), Jay Fiedler (football), Loren Galler Rabinowitz (figure skating), Rebekah Green (shot put), Bess Greenberg (basketball), Elvis M. Sternberg (gymnastics), Dan Grunfeld (basketball), Damion Hahn (wrestling), Sada Jacobson (fencing), Dan Helmer (gymnastics), Anita Kaplan (basketball), Brie Katz (volleyball), Chad Levitt (football), Jessica Levy (volleyball), Samantha Marder (softball), Boyd Melson (boxer), Neil Ravitz (football), Amy Rosson (softball), Rebekah Rottenberg (lacrosse), Mike Saffer (football), Jon Scheyer (basketball), Laine Selwyn (basketball), Marc Siegel (ice hockey), and football player Gabe Carimi.

In 2025, Vassar College basketball player Tova Gelb won the award.

=== The Jules D. & Pearl D. Mazor Awards to the Outstanding Jewish High School Scholar Athletes of the Year ===
Awarded to Adam Balkan (baseball), Stephanie Barnet (squash), Ben Belmont (lacrosse), Rachel Blume (softball), Dannielle Diamant (basketball), Hillary Framson (soccer), Zachary Greenberg (basketball), Ben Herman (swimming), Emily Jacobson (fencing), David Kahn (swimming), Jesse Koller (soccer), Jarryd Levine (soccer), Max Levine (baseball), Jason Liberman (basketball), Sarah Lowenthal (gymnastics), Adam Mahfouda (lacrosse), Samantha Marder (softball), David Posner (lacrosse), Chad Prince (soccer), Jon Scheyer (basketball), Jodi Schlesinger (track), Justin Simon (basketball), Mark Wohlstadter (football), and Courtney Zale (basketball).

=== The Dick Steinberg Award ===
Awarded to Lenny Silberman (Executive), Andy Bloom (shot put), Ron Carner (executive), Dave Cohen (football coach), Gerald Eskenazi (columnist), Jay Fiedler (football), Ken Fiedler (basketball coach), Stan Fischler (broadcasting), Alan Freedman (executive), Nicole Freedman (bicycling), Margie Goldstein-Engle (horse showing), Stan Isaacs (columnist), James Jacobs (handball), Steve Jacobson (columnist), Barry Landers (broadcaster), Nancy Moloff (wheelchair discus), Arthur Richman (baseball writer & executive), Marty Riger (basketball coach), Dick Steinberg (football general manager), Herb Turetzky (basketball), Lisa Winston (columnist), and Boyd Melson (boxer and humanitarian).

=== The George Young Award ===
The George Young Award is given to the person, Jewish or non-Jewish, who "has best exemplified the high ideals that George Young displayed."

It has been awarded to Ernie Accorsi (football), Lou Carnesecca (basketball), Preston Robert Tisch (football), George Young (football) James Metzger (lacrosse), and Joe McMahon (hockey).

== Advisory committee ==
Among those serving on its advisory committee are Marty Appel, Len Berman, Howard David, Ernie Grunfeld and Paul Zimmerman.

== See also ==
- International Jewish Sports Hall of Fame
- Southern California Jewish Sports Hall of Fame
