= James Metzger =

American businessman and philanthropist

James C. Metzger
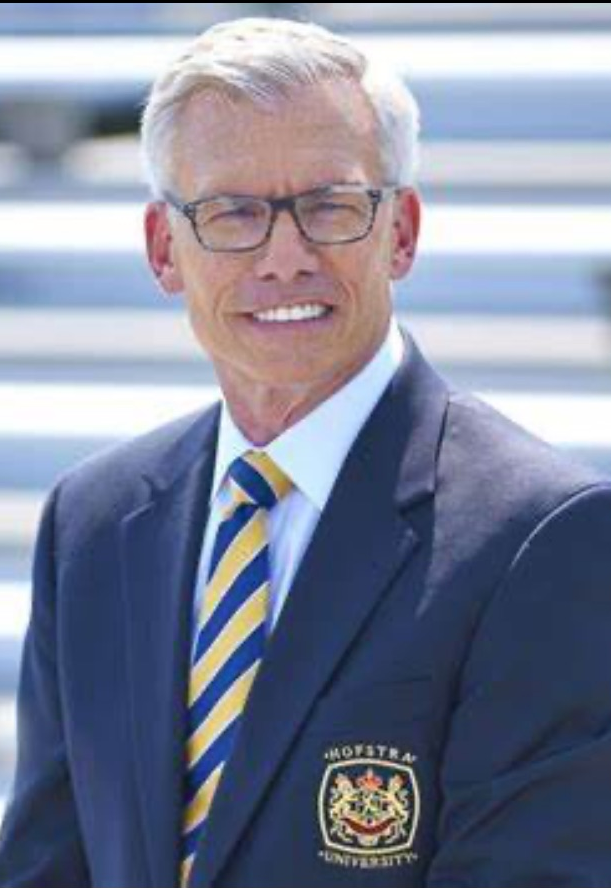
- Born: February 18, 1959 (age 67); New York, U.S.
- Education: Hofstra University
- Occupation: Acrisure Insurance Broker
- Known for: Founder, Chairman & CEO; The Whitmore Agency, LLC Businessman and Philanthropist

James C. Metzger (born February 18, 1959) is an American businessman. He is the founder, chairman and chief executive officer of The Whitmore Agency, LLC, and insurance and financial service firm founded in 1989 and sold in 2019 to Acrisure.

== Athletic career ==
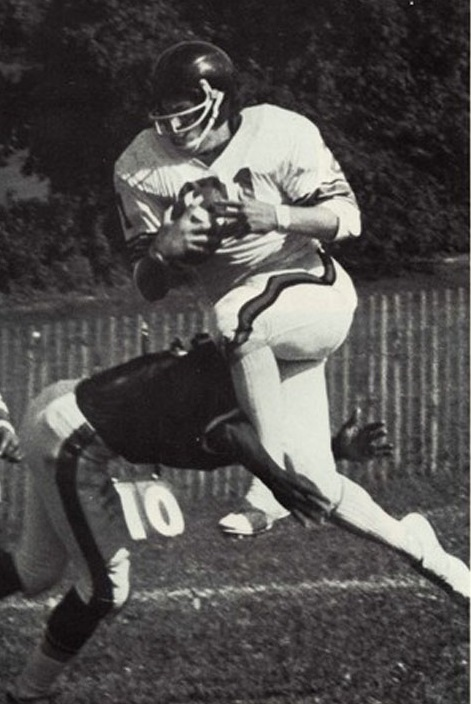
James Metzger No. 21 hurdles through the air to score in a 1975 Half Hollow Hills football game

=== Half Hollow Hills High School ===
Metzger is a 1977 graduate of Half Hollow Hills High School East, where he played field lacrosse, American football and basketball. He set records in football and lacrosse that lasted more than 40 years.

As a high school All-American lacrosse player, Metzger won the Lt. Ray Enners Award as Outstanding Lacrosse Player in Suffolk County, New York in his senior year for the 1977 season. His scoring average of 6.0 points per game was a school record and led Suffolk County public schools. During that same year, Metzger set school records for points in a season, and assists in a game, season and career. During his 1976 junior year he led the team in assists and points. Lt. Raymond Enners, a military hero, also played lacrosse for Hills East and later for the U.S. Military Academy at West Point. During 2019, the school officially retired the jerseys worn by alumni Lt. Enners (#26) and Metzger (#21).

A three-year letterman as a tailback and return specialist on the football team, Metzger graduated as the school's all-time leading scorer and rusher. He was a Suffolk County All-Star running back known for starting 25 consecutive games, accumulating 2,155 yards rushing and scoring 27 touchdowns and four two-point conversions, totaling 170 points. Metzger's all-purpose yardage, career total offense that included receptions and his contributions as a special teams player for yardage gained on punt and kickoff returns, was 2,777 yards. He led the team in scoring in 1974, 1975 and 1976, and rushing in 1975 and 1976. As a junior, Metzger led HHHE in Section 11 NYSPHSAA Conference AAA-1 to a three-way first place tie with Walt Whitman High School (New York) and Lindenhurst Senior High School. He led Conference AAA-1 in rushing and scoring and won the National Bank of North America Game Most Valuable Player Award (MVP) four times. Metzger was recruited to play college football by Syracuse University, Cornell University and Colgate University. He was recruited to play lacrosse by University of Virginia, Army, Navy, Cornell University (Cornell Big Red men's lacrosse), Penn State, Towson University, NC State and Hofstra University.

For 1977, Metzger was the only secondary school student athlete to be selected and participate in both the Police Athletic League (PAL) Suffolk County North – South All-Star Football Game and the Section 11 NYSPHSAA North – South All-Star Lacrosse Game. He started at wing back on the North Football Team and started at attack for the North Lacrosse Team. Metzger, in his sophomore year, also played point guard for his high school basketball 1974-1975 varsity team in the Suffolk County Playoffs.

During the 2021 season, Metzger's football jersey (#21) was retired by the school. His touchdown record was broken during the same season by senior Dakim Griffin. For the season and playoffs, Griffin scored 35 touchdowns and helped lead the team to the Division II Championship game.

=== Scholastic Statistics – Lacrosse ===
Season	Class	GP	G	A	Pts	PPG
1977	Senior	17	20	82	102	6.0

=== Naval Academy Preparatory School ===
Following high school, Metzger attended the Naval Academy Preparatory School in Newport, Rhode Island. A starter at halfback on the football team, he sustained a severe shoulder injury that ended his football career. However, he led the lacrosse team in goals, assists, points and points per game as an attackman. Metzger declined an appointment to the United States Naval Academy to accept an athletic scholarship from Hofstra University.

=== Prep School – Lacrosse ===
Season	Class	GP	G	A	Pts	PPG
1978	Post-Graduate	10	30	36	66	6.6

=== Hofstra University ===
Metzger was an NCAA Division 1 All-American lacrosse player at Hofstra University in Hempstead, New York. His sophomore year record-setting scoring average of 4.9 points per game still stands. Metzger's single season average ranks fifth in the history of the program and his single season assist average ranks eighth all time. Metzger is one of only three players in the history of Hofstra's Men's Lacrosse to score eight or more points three times in one season. He also is one of only four Hofstra Pride men's lacrosse players to be honored with a retired number. During his Hofstra lacrosse career, Metzger played as both attackman and midfielder on the men's field lacrosse team. During his 1979 freshman year, Metzger led the team in assists. During the 1980 season, he recorded eight points in games against Pennsylvania State University (Penn State Nittany Lions men's lacrosse), Towson University (Towson Tigers men's lacrosse) and North Carolina State University (NC State Wolfpack men's lacrosse).

Metzger left the Hofstra lacrosse program after the 1980 season for personal reasons and did not fulfill his final two years of eligibility. He graduated in 1983 with a bachelor of arts degree in history. During 2007, Metzger reconnected with the university to become the school's leading athletics donor. During 2012, Hofstra established The James C. Metzger Outstanding Sophomore Award given to the lacrosse team's best sophomore player.

=== NCAA Lacrosse statistics ===
Season	Class	GP	G	A	Pts	PPG
1980	Soph	10	21	28	49	4.90

== Whitmore Agency ==
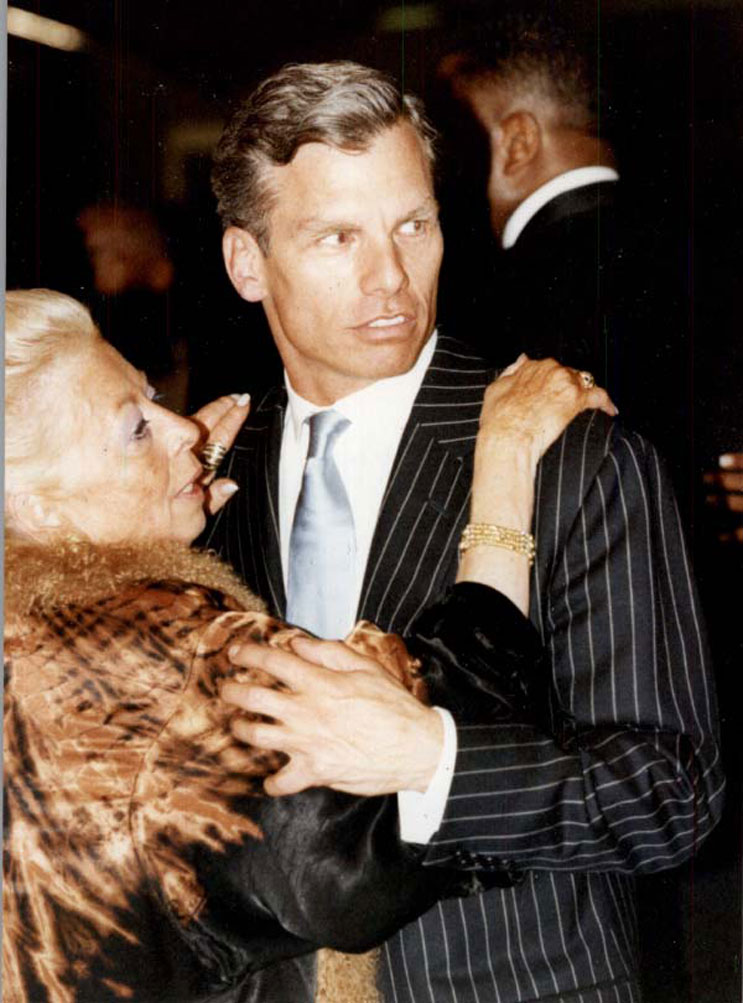
James C. Metzger in 1998.

Metzger entered the general insurance, risk management and health insurance business during 1983 and founded The Whitmore Group, Ltd. in Roslyn Heights, New York, during 1989. Various media, including Long Island Business News, reported during 2011 that The Whitmore Group was the seventh largest insurance brokerage business on Long Island. Metzger relocated the corporate office to Garden City, New York, and rebranded the business as The Whitmore Agency.

The company was founded on the strength of its commercial insurance market share in the New York Metropolitan Area funeral home industry. The company expand insurance underwriting into the vertical integration of the funeral industry to provide insurance policies for coffins (caskets), crematoriums, cemeteries and gravestones (monument companies). The Whitmore Group/Agency, through various state, regional and national funeral association endorsements, developed national commercial insurance market share in the death care industry in the United States. Metzger became a major donor and served as a board of director and trustee for the Funeral Service Foundation.

For three decades, Whitmore expanded its insurance brokerage business to provide commercial insurance, risk management services, life insurance and employee benefits for the construction, real estate, transportation, manufacturing and the hospitality industry business sectors. On March 1, 2019, Metzger sold his business to Acrisure, a financial, technology and insurance company in Grand Rapids, Michigan, that is listed as the sixth largest insurance broker in the world in the 2022 Business Insurance magazine published by Crain Communications.

=== Hofstra University ===
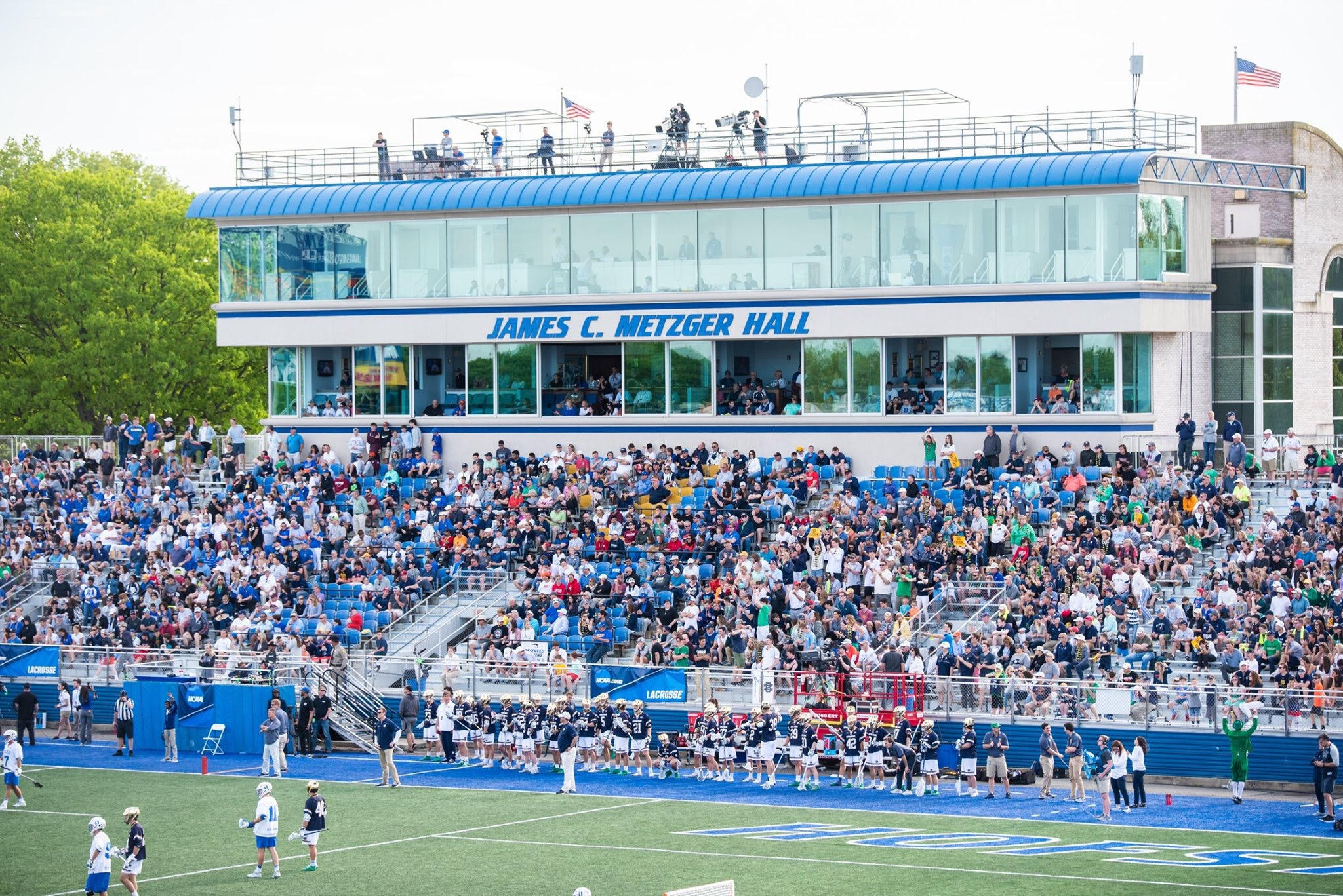
James C. Metzger Hall at Shuart Stadium on Hofstra University Campus in New York.

Metzger is a contributor to the educational and athletic programs at Hofstra University. During 2012, Metzger donated $1.5 million, the largest gift ever received by Hofstra Athletics. Hofstra named The James C. Metzger Fund for a capital improvement plan and endowments and The James C. Metzger Hofstra Lacrosse Endowment in his honor in appreciation of the gift.

Hofstra dedicated James C. Metzger Hall on April 7, 2015. Located on the west side of James M. Shuart Stadium on the Hofstra campus, Metzger Hall includes The Fried Center (second floor), stadium suites (third floor) and the stadium press box (fourth floor). The Fried Center is the home for academic and career development pursuits and it also houses the Student-Athlete Advisory Committee (SAAC) and the Athletic Department's community service program.

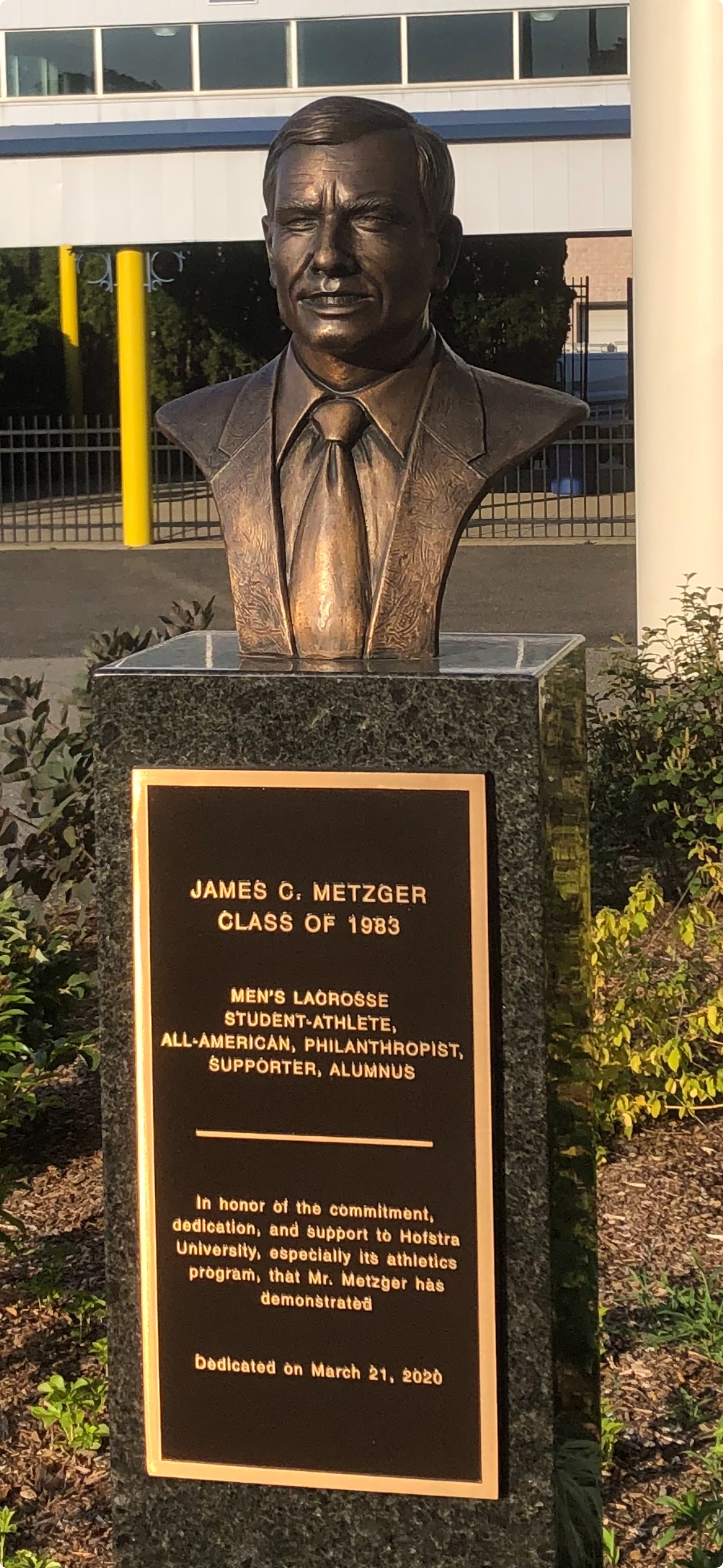
Hofstra University honored James C. Metzger by placing a bust outside its main athletic complex.

Metzger received the Hofstra Alumnus of the Year Award during 2016. When The Hofstra University Athletic Hall of Fame inducted Metzger during 2015, he joined two fellow members, United States Intercollegiate Lacrosse Association (USILA) All-Americans Doug Shanahan and Jerry Simandl, as the only Hofstra men's lacrosse athletes to be honored with a retired number.

During 2012, Metzger received Hofstra University's Alumni Achievement Award, a recognition presented to alumni who have distinguished themselves in their chosen fields of endeavor and/or demonstrated outstanding service to the university. A year earlier, he received Hofstra's Joseph M. Margiotta Distinguished Service Award. Named for a Hofstra student-athlete and supporter of the university, the award is presented in recognition of extraordinary dedication, generosity and service to the Hofstra Pride Club and Hofstra athletics.

During 2020, Metzger was honored, along with three other individuals, with a bronze bust on stadium grounds. Also honored with busts were Hofstra luminaries James M. Shuart, former president of Hofstra University; Joseph M. Margiotta, former Hofstra football player and Hofstra Pride Club president, who also served in the New York State Assembly; and Howdy Myers, former Hofstra Pride athletic director, football coach and lacrosse coach. Myers also coached football and lacrosse at Johns Hopkins University and is a member of the National Lacrosse Hall of Fame.

=== Hofstra University Athletics Projects at Margiotta Hall ===
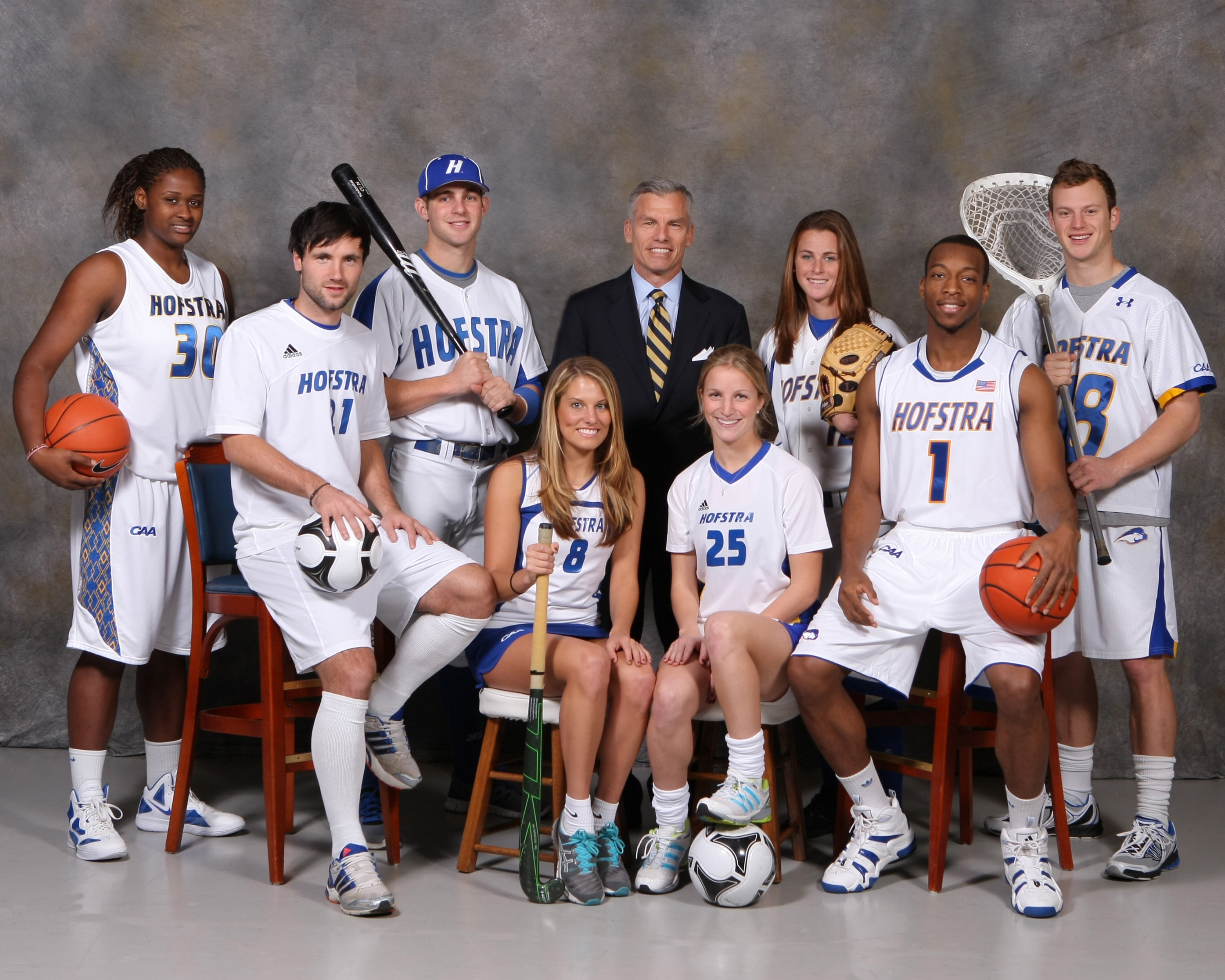
James Metzger in 2012 surrounded by team captains of Hofstra University sports after his donation was announced.

Metzger's philanthropic involvement with Hofstra University began during 2007 with several special projects that addressed improvements for Joseph M. Margiotta Hall, the three-story, 22,500 square-foot building that is the main field house for Hofstra athletics. The Royle – Sombrotto Men's Lacrosse Locker Room at Hofstra was built that same year. The locker room memorializes contributions to Hofstra lacrosse by two people who impacted Metzger's life and career: Harry Royle, who was Hofstra's Men's Lacrosse Head Coach from 1976 through 1985, and Vincent Sombrotto , a college teammate and former professional sports player with Major League Lacrosse and the National Lacrosse League. Sombrotto is a member of the National Lacrosse Hall of Fame. During 2019, Hofstra Athletics announced that Metzger provided an additional leadership gift to the university to support the renovation of the locker facilities. The project, completed and unveiled on January 13, 2020, features 48 new lockers and a complete remodel of the locker rooms.

The "Football and Lacrosse Traditions Project" at Margiotta Hall was created to showcase the history of the men's and women's lacrosse programs and the football program. The project, funded by Metzger during 2009, was named for Hofstra standout athletes Mike D’Amato ‘68 and Lou DiBlasi ‘61. D'Amato played defensive back for the New York Jets and was a member of its 1969 Super Bowl championship team. DiBlasi was Metzger's lacrosse coach and football coach at Half Hollow Hills High School.

The Lacrosse Reception Room renovations funded by Metzger was named after Gary Arnold '83 and the Unterstein family. Arnold was a four-year letterman in lacrosse and team leader in goals for 1981 and 1982. Following graduation, he served as an assistant coach under Harry Royle. The Unterstein family is the only family in Hofstra lacrosse history collectively to earn Coastal Athletic Association conference player of the year (Chris, 2006), defensive player of the year (Kevin, 2008) and rookie of the year (Mike, 2005). Chris earned 2005 First Team All-American honors while Kevin was an honorable mention All-American for 2007. Kevin also was a member of the 2018 United States men's national lacrosse team in the World Lacrosse Championship games. The three brothers participated in the USILA Senior All Star Game (Chris, 2006; Kevin and Mike; 2008).

The Metzger-Huff Lacrosse Offices at Hofstra University were dedicated during 2010 and named for Metzger and Kevin Huff (Hofstra '78). Huff, who was an assistant coach at the university. A Hofstra Pride football and men's field lacrosse standout, Huff was a National Collegiate Athletic Association two-time All-American in lacrosse. In football, he was an All-Eastern College Athletic Conference selection and Metropolitan Intercollegiate Conference Offensive Player of the Year. The women's lacrosse locker room also was named to honor James C. Metzger during 2010 in recognition of his support of the Hofstra Pride Women's Lacrosse program.

== Other notable charities and recognition ==
James C. Metzger Stadium, a 1,000-capacity stadium at St. Anthony's High School, in South Huntington, New York, was completed during 2016. Metzger is not a St. Anthony's alum, but he has become a benefactor to that school.
