= Lt. Ray Enners Award =

The Lt. Ray Enners Award is presented annually to the most outstanding high school lacrosse player on Long Island's Suffolk County, New York by the Suffolk County Boys Lacrosse Coaches Association, Section XI Athletics. The recipient best exemplifies courage, teamwork, skill and leadership. The award is named in memory of Raymond Enners.

Lt. Enners was raised in Farmingdale, New York and attended Half Hollow Hills High School, part of the Half Hollow Hills Central School District, located in Dix Hills, New York. He was voted to the 1963 All-Long Island lacrosse team. Lt. Enners later excelled at lacrosse at the United States Military Academy. During his 1967 senior year, Lt. Enners was an NCAA Honorable Mention All-American. He was inducted posthumously into the Suffolk Sports Hall of Fame during 2004.

While leading a platoon in Vietnam, Lt. Enners was killed in combat on September 18, 1968. Lt. Enners received the Distinguished Service Cross, the Bronze Star Medal and the Purple Heart for extraordinary heroism in combat in South Vietnam. During 2016, Richard W. Enners, Lt. Enners' younger brother who also is a graduate of the U.S. Military Academy at West Point, authored the book, Heart of Gray. The book details the story about his brother, Alpha Company, 1-20th Infantry, 11th Brigade, and Lt. Enners' courage and sacrifice in Vietnam.

Half Hollow Hills High School (now known as Half Hollow Hills East High School) retired Lt. Enners' number 26 lacrosse jersey. At the same 2019 ceremony, the school retired the number 21 lacrosse jersey worn by alumnus James Metzger, the 1977 recipient of the Lt. Ray Enners Award.

This award is one of three that have been named in memory of Lt. Enners. The others are the Lt. Raymond Enners Award presented to the NCAA National Player of the Year in men's lacrosse and The Lt. Enners–Chris Pettit Award presented each season to Army's offensive most valuable player.

Year	Winner	Position	HS All-American	School	Coach
1970	Mike McCormick	Attackman		Ward Melville	Joe Cuozzo
1971	Richard Meister	Defense	Yes	Deer Park	Warren Deutch
1972	Frank Urso	Middie	Yes	Brentwood	Bob Hoppey
1973	Bob McGuire	Attackman	Yes	Huntington	Aaron Littman
1974	Bill Carpluk	Middie	Yes	Central Islip	George O Leary
1975	Bill Brown	Attackman	Yes	Ward Melville	Joe Cuozzo
1976	Peter Predun	Middie	Yes	Harborfields	Mike Liese
1977	James Metzger	Attackman - Middie	Yes	Half Hollow Hills	Lou DiBlasi
1978	Albert Ray	Middie	Yes	Copiaque	Walter Reese
1979	Robert MacAneney	Attackman		Brentwood Ross	Peter Murray
1980	Glen Mohrman	Middie	Yes	Half Hollow Hills	Stan Kowalski
1981	James M. Smith	Middie	Yes	Comsewogue	Ken Reese
1982	Tom Gunderson	Middie	Yes	Smithtown East	Lou Antonetti Sr.
1983	Chris Walker	Defense	Yes	Ward Melville	Joe Cuozzo
1984	Chris Garvey	Middie	Yes	Half Hollow Hills	Doug Mayer
1985	Scott Reh	Middie	Yes	Rocky Point	Mike Bowler
1986	Jonathan Reese	Middie	Yes	West Babylon	Rich Burns
1987	Steven Randby	Goalie	Yes	Half Hollow Hills	Doug Mayer
1988	Joe Matassa	Middie	Yes	Ward Melville	Joe Cuozzo
1989	John Banks	Goalie	Yes	Ward Melville	Joe Cuozzo
1990	Joe Romeo	Goalie		Comsewogue	Bob Woods
1991	Chris Theofield	Attackman - Middie		Northport	Bob Macaluso
1992	Mike LaRocco	Goalie	Yes	Smithtown West	Ralph Pepe
1993	Greg Cattrano	Goalie	Yes	Ward Melville	Joe Cuozzo
1994	Al Hernandez	Defense	Yes	Whitman	Bob Howell
1995	Jay Negus	Attackman - Middie	Yes	Ward Melville	Joe Cuozzo
1996	Will Campbell	Attackman - Middie	Yes	Sachem	Rick Mercurio
1997	Justin O'Connell	Defense	Yes	Sachem	Rick Mercurio
1998	Nick Russo	Attackman - Middie	Yes	Comsewogue	Pete Mitchell
1999	Kevin Cassese	Middie/Faceoff specialist	Yes	Comsewogue	Pete Mitchell
2000	Peter Vlahakis	Middie		Shoreham-Wading River	Tim Rotanz
2001	Nick Miaritis	Attackman - Middie	Yes	Ward Melville	Joe Cuozzo
2002	Matt Miller	Middie	Yes	William Floyd	Victor Guadagnino
2003	Larry Cerasi	Attackman		Middle Country	Ken Budd
2004	Jeff Strittmatter	Attackman - Middie	Yes	Rocky Point	Mike Bowler
2005	Pat Perritt	Attackman	Yes	Sachem East	Rick Mercurio
2006	Chris Ritchie	Attackman	Yes	Mount Sinai	Jason Sanders
2007	Justin Turri	Attackman	Yes	West Islip	Scott Craig
2008	Dwayne Stewart	Attackman		Copiaque	Jim Konen
2009	Kevin Sabo	Attackman - Middie		Westhampton Beach	Ralph Pepe
2010	Nicky Galasso	Attackman	Yes	West Islip	Scott Craig
2011	Luke Miller	Middie		William Floyd	Desmond Magna
2012	Sam Llinares	Attackman - Middie	Yes	Hauppauge	Jim Konen
2013	Tim Rotanz	Attackman	Yes	Shoreham-Wading River	Tom Rotanz
2014	Kieran Mullins	Attackman - Middie	Yes	Islip High School	Keith Scheidel
2015	John Daniggelis	Attackman - Middie	Yes	Smithtown East	Jason Lambert
2016	Gerard Arceri	Middie/Faceoff specialist	Yes	Smithtown East	Jason Lambert
2017	Chris Gray	Attackman	Yes	Shoreham-Wading River	Mike Taylor
2018	Zach Hobbes	Middie	Yes	Ward Melville	Jay Negus
2019	Conor Calderone	Face-off Specialist/Middie	Yes	Smithtown West	Bobby Moltisanti Jr.
2020	No Award	Competition suspended due to pandemic			
2021	Ryan Bell	Attackman	Yes	Smithtown West	Bobby Moltisanti Jr.
2022	Joey Spallina	Attackman	Yes	Mount Sinai	Harold Drumm
2023	Andrew Miller	Long Stick Midfielder	Yes	Northport	Larry Cerasi
2024	Matt McIntee	Attackman	Yes	East Islip	Tom Zummo
2025	Anthony Raio	Middie	Yes	Half Hollow Hills West	Connor Hagans

For more information about Lt. Enners and the Suffolk County high school award named in his honor, see the June 15, 2016 Suffolk County Lacrosse Coach's Association Awards Program, page 19.
