= General agent =

Representative with a general mandate

A general agent is an agent, i.e., representative of another, who has a mandate of general nature.

== Colonial use ==
In the Niger Rivers District the only senior agent, who administered the region (rather like a factor) for the National African Company Limited (which was granted a charter and renamed Royal Niger Company Chartered & Limited in 1886), was promoted in 1882 to become the first of only two general agents until it was absorbed by Southern Nigeria:

- 1882 - 1888 David McIntosh (b. 1844 - d. 1888)
- 1888 - 1 January 1900 Joseph Flint (d. 1925)

== Sources ==
- WorldStatesmen- here Nigeria

== See also ==
- Agent-general
- Managing general agent
