= Jewish Sports Hall of Fame =

The Jewish Sports Hall of Fame may refer to:

- The International Jewish Sports Hall of Fame in Netanya, Israel
- The National Jewish Museum Sports Hall of Fame in Commack, New York
- The Orange County Jewish Sports Hall of Fame at the Merage Jewish Community Center in Irvine, California
- The Southern California Jewish Sports Hall of Fame in Beverley Hills, California
