= DeVos Place Convention Center =

Convention center in Michigan, United States

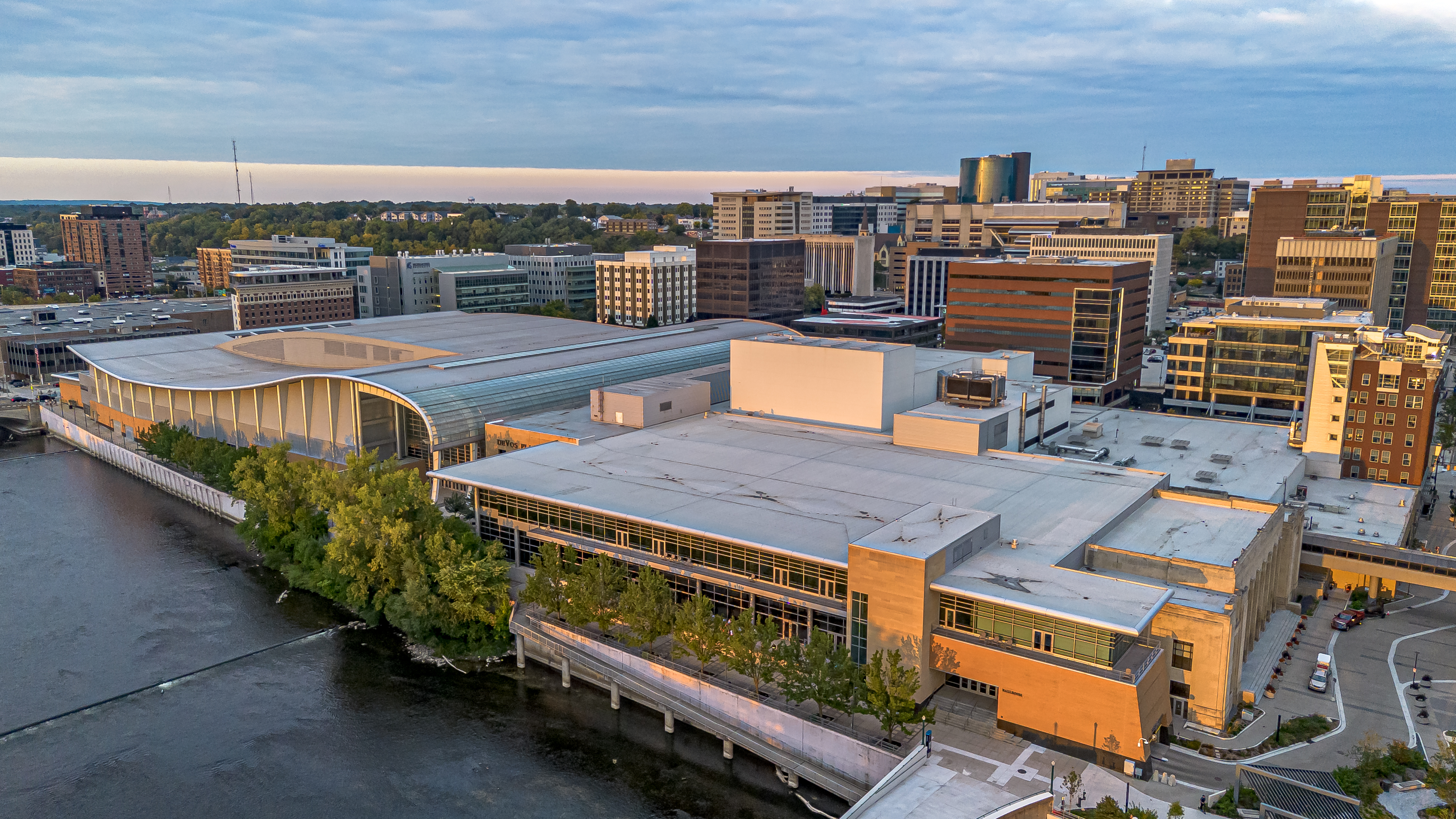
- DeVos Place in 2025
- Interactive map of DeVos Place Convention Center
- Address: 303 Monroe Ave NW
- Location: Grand Rapids, Michigan
- Coordinates: 42.96933°N 85.67345°W
- Owner: Grand Rapids-Kent County Convention/Arena Authority
- Operator: Legends Global

Construction
- Opened: 2004

Website
- devosplace.org

DeVos Place Convention Center, erected on the Grand River in downtown Grand Rapids, Michigan, is a multi-purpose convention center. It is named for Richard DeVos, who donated $20 million towards its construction.

The convention center contains a large, 162,000 square foot exhibit hall and an additional 40,000 square foot ballroom.

The convention center is owned by the Grand Rapids-Kent County Convention/Arena Authority and managed by Legends Global.

== DeVos Performance Hall ==
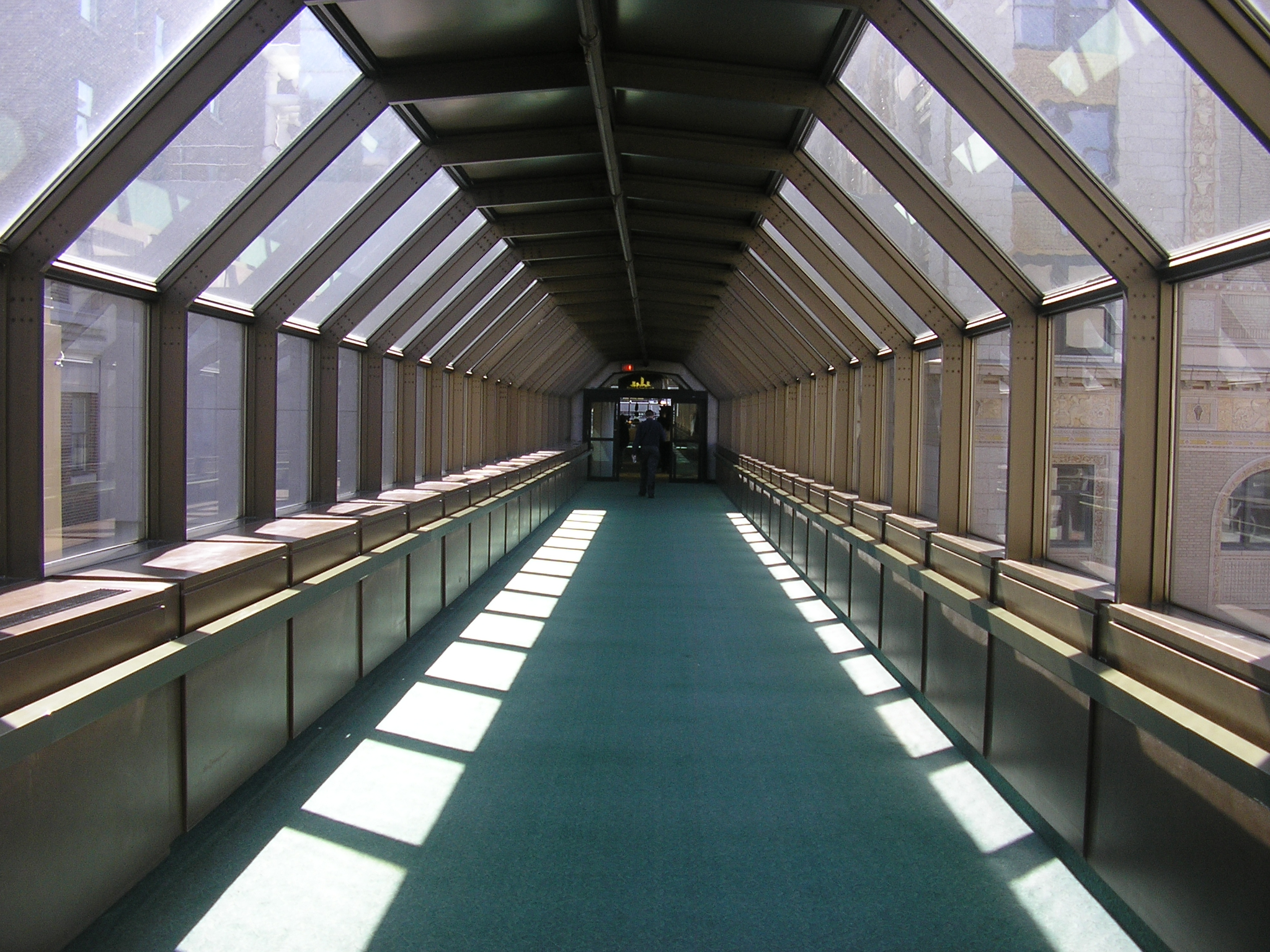
Skyway to Amway.

The DeVos Performance Hall is a 2,404-seat theater located on the south side of the building. It was built in 1980 and is home to the Grand Rapids Symphony and Broadway Grand Rapids.

DeVos Performance Hall has hosted concerts by artists such as Guns N' Roses, B. B. King, Barenaked Ladies, James Taylor, Tori Amos, Eddie Money, Sammy Hagar, Harry Connick Jr., and Ne-Yo. It has also featured comedians such as Jerry Seinfeld, Bill Cosby, Daniel Middleton and Ron White; and family shows including Dora The Explorer Live, Bear in The Big Blue House Live, Blue's Clues Live and Thomas & Friends Live. Eddie Money had traditionally kicked off DeVos Performance Hall's summer concert schedule every year.

The new lobby of DeVos Performance Hall was unveiled in June 2002 as part of the DeVos Place Expansion project. The renovated lobby includes a terrazzo floor, and a renewed box office with an outside window and a scrolling marquee. Another part of the renovations included revised restroom facilities, located on the north side of the theater on the second and third floors.

Internal renovations included refurbished theater seating, as well as new wall and ceiling finishes, new flooring and enhanced colored accent lighting. New balcony light fixtures were added along with redesigned balcony fronts.

The 2026 opening of Acrisure Amphitheater is expected to reduce the number of concerts being held at DeVos Performance Hall during the summer months.

== Welsh Auditorium ==
The Welsh Auditorium facade remains from the original structure, which faces the Amway Grand Plaza Hotel.

== Grand River Promenade ==
The Grand River Promenade, the official name for the skyway, goes between the DeVos Place Convention Center and the Van Andel Arena.
