= Acrisure =

American insurance broker

- Type: Financial technology
- Industry: Insurance
- Founded: 2005; 21 years ago
- Founders: Greg Williams, Ricky Norris
- Headquarters: Grand Rapids, Michigan, United States
- Services: Banking; Insurance; Investing
- Revenue: $2.82 billion ▲ (2021)
- Website: acrisure.com

Acrisure is an American financial technology and insurance company headquartered in Grand Rapids, Michigan. The company was initially created to acquire insurance companies in the Midwestern United States and has since expanded nationally. In 2022, Business Insurance recognized Acrisure as the 6th largest insurance broker in the world.

== History ==
Acrisure was founded in 2005 by Greg Williams and Ricky Norris. In 2013, Genstar Capital purchased Acrisure and much of the company's growth was accounted by acquisitions; in 2014 the company acquired 23 firms and in 2015, it took over 59 other agencies compared to 26 acquisitions between 2005 and 2013. The majority of Acrisure's trade – 60% of deals – come from existing entities it acquired, with the company's chief financial officer Dave Tuit stating "We find successful agencies, buy them and they become an agency partner." In October 2016, Acrisure's management purchased back ownership of the company from Genstar Capital.

Blackstone Inc provided funding to Acrisure in December 2018. In 2019, the company was 84% employee-owned. That same year, Acrisure and Pittsburgh-based Tulco Holdings launched Altway Insurance, a direct-to-consumer artificial intelligence-backed insurance platform. In 2020, Acrisure acquired Tulco's artificial intelligence insurance business, including the companies' Altway venture, as part of a stock-for-stock transaction. In 2021 alone, the company acquired 155 firms, generating $2.82 billion of revenue and experiencing 42.7% growth. Acrisure was granted naming rights for the newly-constructed Acrisure Arena in Thousand Palms, California in January 2022.

In June 2022, the Abu Dhabi Investment Authority (ADIA) funded $725 million in series B-2 stock funds to Acrisure, with the company being valued at $23 billion at the time. In July 2022, Acrisure was granted naming rights for Acrisure Stadium (previously known as Heinz Field) in Pittsburgh, Pennsylvania, home to the Pittsburgh Steelers.

In July 2022, Acrisure acquired two managed service providers, ITS Inc. and Catalyst Technology Group.

In September 2023, it was announced Acrisure had acquired the London-headquartered insurance company, Modus Underwriting Ltd. That month, the insurance company also earned naming rights for a new amphitheater in Grand Rapids, Acrisure Amphitheater.

Acrisure's mortgage subsidiary FBC Mortgage rebranded itself as Acrisure Mortgage in 2025, leading the sponsored name of the University of Central Florida's football stadium near Orlando to change from FBC Mortgage Stadium to Acrisure Bounce House.

In December 2025, it was announced Acrisure had acquired the algorithmic underwriting Managing General Agent (MGA) Vave from Canopius Group for an undisclosed amount.
