= Jon Denning =

American NASCAR driver

Jonathan Denning
- Born: March 14, 1987 (age 39); Springfield, New Jersey, U.S.
- Awards: 2012 National Jewish Sports Hall of Fame and Museum Inductee

Jonathan Alan Denning (born March 14, 1987) is an American NASCAR driver.

In 2009, Denning left his NASCAR career to continue his education. On April 29, 2012, Denning was inducted into the National Jewish Sports Hall of Fame and Museum and is the only person to have done so in the "Auto Racing" category.

== College career ==
Denning graduated from Stevens Institute of Technology in May 2012 with high honors with a Bachelor of Science in Business and Technology and a minor in Economics.
