= Stan Cockerton =

Canadian lacrosse player

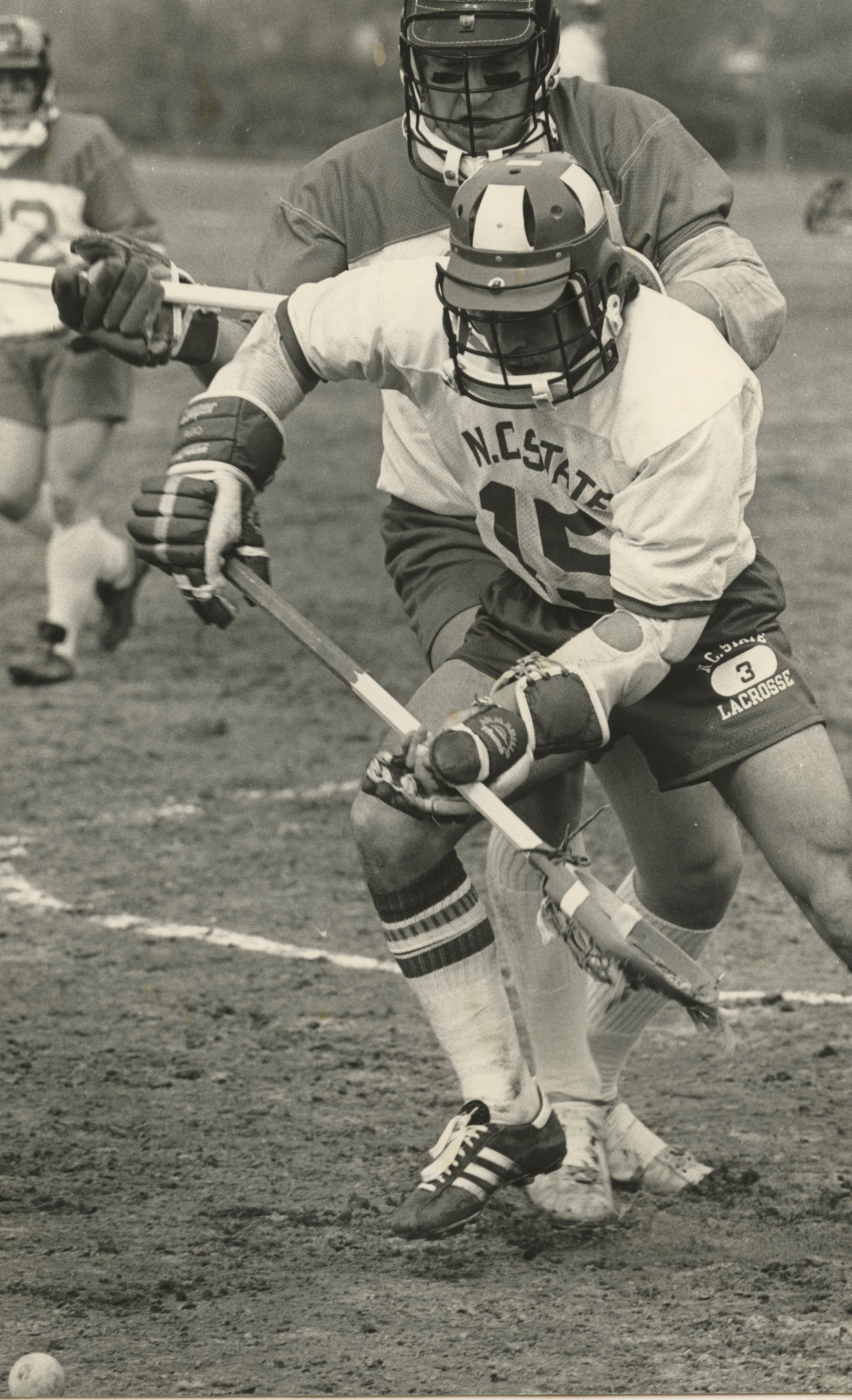
- Cockerton playing for the North Carolina State Wolfpack.

Personal information
- Nationality: Canadian
- Born: May 19, 1955 (age 71) Oshawa, Ontario

Sport
- Position: Attack
- Shoots: Left
- NCAA MSL OLA Jr A team: North Carolina State University; Brooklin Redmen; Oshawa Green Gaels

Career highlights
- NCAA D-I Career Records: 1st in goals per game; 3rd in points per game; 5th in goals; Other: 1978 World Lacrosse Championship Gold (Canada); 1979 Second Team Men’s All-American; 1978 Second Team Men’s All-American; 1977 Third Team Men’s All-American

Stan Cockerton (born May 19, 1955) is a former All-American lacrosse player for the NC State Wolfpack men's lacrosse team from 1977 to 1980, leading the Wolfpack to its only NCAA Men's Lacrosse Championship tournament appearance in 1979.

== Career ==
Cockerton is among the all-time career goal scorers with 193 and is second in points per game at 6.36. He led the Wolfpack to 30 wins from 1977 to 1980, with two second-place finishes in the Atlantic Coast Conference. North Carolina State cancelled the varsity lacrosse program in 1983. Stan once scored 11 goals in one game, against Salisbury State in 1979.

Cockerton, a three time first-team All American, learned the game in Ontario playing box lacrosse for the famed Oshawa Green Gaels junior team. He also teamed with Mike French for the 1978 Canadian National Team upset over a heavily favored U.S. team, scoring the overtime winning goal. Cockerton also played for the Brooklin Redmen in Major Series Lacrosse, while he was going to school at North Carolina State, scoring over 200 points for the Redmen.

Cockerton is currently the president of the Ontario Lacrosse Association and is the founder of the Heritage Cup. He was formerly the president of the Federation of International Lacrosse. Stan was inducted into the Canadian Lacrosse Hall of Fame in 2003 and the National Lacrosse Hall of Fame in 2014.

Stan is the father of Mark and Matt Cockerton, two highly touted players from the OLA Junior A Lacrosse League, who played college lacrosse at the University of Virginia.

== Statistics ==
=== North Carolina State University ===
Season	GP	G	A	Pts	PPG
1977	11	52	20	72	6.55
1978	11	45	27	72	6.36
1979	12	51	25	76	6.33
1980	11	45	15	60	5.55
Totals	44	193	87	280	6.32

- 1st in Division I career goals per game
- 3rd in Division I career points per game

=== OLA Jr A and MSL ===
			Regular Season					Playoffs
Season	Team	League	GP	G	A	Pts	PIM	GP	G	A	Pts	PIM
1970	Oshawa Green Gaels	OLA Jr A	1	--	--	--	--	2	0	2	2	0
1971	Oshawa Green Gaels	OLA Jr A	25	14	12	26	46	5	0	0	0	2
1972	Oshawa Green Gaels	OLA Jr A	28	43	33	76	86	17	23	26	49	28
1973	Oshawa Green Gaels	OLA Jr A	28	56	72	128	109	--	--	--	--	--
1973	Brooklin Redmen	MSL	1	1	1	2	0	--	--	--	--	--
1974	Oshawa Green Gaels	OLA Jr A	22	51	55	106	91	12	18	36	54	55
1975	Oshawa Green Gaels	OLA Jr A	28	68	62	130	102	2	9	5	14	16
1976	Oshawa Green Gaels	OLA Jr A	26	87	81	168	67	6	16	21	37	20
1977	Brooklin Redmen	MSL	16	56	36	92	36	4	7	12	19	14
1978	Brooklin Redmen	MSL	11	27	22	49	31	3	5	3	8	2
1979	Brooklin Redmen	MSL	12	25	44	69	10	4	13	9	22	6
1980	Brooklin Redmen	MSL	8	12	8	20	49	1	--	--	--	--
Junior A Totals			158	319	315	634	501	44	66	90	153	121
SENIOR TOTALS			48	121	111	232	126	12	25	23	49	22

== See also ==
- Canadian Lacrosse Hall of Fame
- NC State Athletic Hall of Fame
- NC State Wolfpack men's lacrosse
- Oshawa Green Gaels
