= Jane Katz =

American swimmer

- Born: 1943 (age 82–83); Sharon, Pennsylvania, U.S.
- Education: City College of New York (Bachelors in Physical Education, 1963); New York University (Master's in Education Administration, 1966); Columbia University (Master's in Therapeutic Recreation for Aging, 1972; Doctor of Education in Gerontology, 1978)
- Occupation: Professor
- Employer(s): City University of New York and John Jay College of Criminal Justice
- Known for: Swimmer; Olympian and 15 Maccabiah Games
- Awards: Federation Internationale de Natation Amateur Certificate of Merit (2000); National Jewish Sports Hall of Fame (2011); International Marathon Swimming Hall of Fame (2014); Lifetime Achievement Award from the US President's Council on Fitness, Sports, and Nutrition (2014)

Jane Katz (born 1943) is an educator, author, and world-class former Olympic competitive and long-distance swimmer. She has been awarded the Federation Internationale de Natation Amateur Certificate of Merit (2000) and the Lifetime Achievement Award from the US President's Council on Fitness, Sports, and Nutrition (2014), and inducted into the National Jewish Sports Hall of Fame (2011) and the International Marathon Swimming Hall of Fame (2014).

== Early life, personal life, and education ==
Katz was born in Sharon, Pennsylvania, and raised on the Lower East Side in Manhattan, New York, and is Jewish. Her parents were Leon and Dorothea Katz. Her father coached the Lower East Side Neighborhood Association swim and track team, was a professor of electrical engineering technology, and with her mother wrote the electrical engineering book Transients in Electric Circuits. Her father's parents were professional musicians Israel Katz and Ida Elkan Katz.

She went to Seward Park High School on the Lower East Side, and then attended City College of New York in Manhattan, studying physical education and receiving a bachelor's degree in 1963. Katz earned a master's degree in Education Administration from New York University in 1966, and a master's in Therapeutic Recreation for Aging in 1972 and a Doctor of Education degree in Gerontology in 1978 from Columbia University.

Since 1964, Katz has taught Aquatic Fitness and Safety at the City University of New York. While at the City University of New York, she worked at Bronx Community College and in 1989, she began at the John Jay College of Criminal Justice, in the Department of Physical Education and Athletics, teaching fitness and swimming to New York City police officers and firefighters. Katz resides in New York City.

In April 1996 she married Herbert L. Erlanger, an attending anesthesiologist at New York Hospital-Cornell Medical Center, whom Katz had dated since the 1960s, at Tavern on the Green in Manhattan. Erlanger died in 2007.

== Swimming career ==
Katz's father taught her how to swim at age two, and she competed in her first swim meet at age seven.

She competed in the 1957 Maccabiah Games at the age of 14, winning the 100m butterfly, winning a silver medal in the medley relay, and winning a bronze medal in the 400 m. She lamented the fact that she believed she had been a better swimmer two years earlier, at 12 years of age. At the 1961 Maccabiah Games, she won the gold medal in the 100 m butterfly, and a gold medal in the 400 m relay.

Katz was awarded the Ballinger Award as the outstanding senior woman swimmer in the Metropolitan Amateur Athletic Union in 1959, 1960, and 1961.

As a member of the 1964 Olympics United States Synchronized Swimming Performance Team in Tokyo, Katz helped pioneer the acceptance of synchronized swimming as an Olympic event. From 1974–87, she was the U.S. Masters Synchronized Swimming National Solo Champion.

In 1989, Katz won gold medals in the Second World Masters Games in Denmark in the 100, 200, 400, 800 and 1500-m freestyle. In 1994, she won the 400-m freestyle in the 50 to 54 age group at the Fifth World Masters Championship in Montreal.

By 2011, she had won 34 All-American U.S. Masters Swimming titles.

At the 2013 Maccabiah Games in the Masters category Katz won 11 individual medals and two relay medals in the Masters category. At the 2017 Maccabiah Games, at the age of 74 her 15th Maccabiah, she won gold medals in both the 200m free and 100m back, as well as silver medals in the 50m free and 200m breast, as in total she medaled in eight Masters individual and relay events. She is still swimming competitively with the US Masters as of July 2021.

== Honors and Halls of Fame ==
In 1976, Katz became the first woman to be admitted to the City College of New York Sports Hall of Fame. At the XXVII Olympiad in Sydney, Australia, in 2000, Katz was awarded the Federation Internationale de Natation Amateur Certificate of Merit to honor her lifetime of "dedication and contribution to the development" of the sport of swimming.

On March 27, 2011, Katz was inducted into the National Jewish Sports Hall of Fame in Commack, New York for her pioneering athletic contributions to the field of aquatics. She was also inducted into the International Marathon Swimming Hall of Fame in 2014. In September 2014, she received the Lifetime Achievement Award from the US President's Council on Fitness, Sports, and Nutrition.

== Books and DVDs ==
After being injured in a 1979 car accident when she was rammed by a drunk driver, Katz devised her own aquatic program to speed her rehabilitation. From this experience she began creating a series of instructional books and videos. Among them is the DVD, "Swim Basics – Aquatics for Lifetime Fitness" (2005), and the books, Your Water Workout: No-Impact Aerobics and Strength Training From Yoga, Pilates, Tai Chi and More (Broadway Books, 2003) and Swimming For Total Fitness, co-authored by Nancy P. Bruning (Broadway Books, 1993). She is the author of 14 books on swimming, fitness, and exercising in the water.
