= Melvin Fowler =

American football player (born 1979)

No. 67
- Position: Center

Personal information
- Born: March 31, 1979 (age 47); Brooklyn, New York, U.S.
- Listed height: 6 ft 3 in (1.91 m)
- Listed weight: 295 lb (134 kg)

Career information
- High school: Half Hollow Hills West (Dix Hills, New York)
- College: Maryland
- NFL draft: 2002: 3rd round, 76th overall pick

Career history
- Cleveland Browns (2002–2004); Minnesota Vikings (2005); Buffalo Bills (2006–2008); Arizona Cardinals (2009)*; Detroit Lions (2009); Florida Tuskers (2010)*
- * Offseason or practice squad member only

Awards and highlights
- Third-team All-American (2001); First-team All-ACC (2001)

Career NFL statistics
- Games played: 87
- Games started: 60
- Fumble recoveries: 3
- Stats at Pro Football Reference

Melvin Thaddeus Fowler Jr. (born March 31, 1979) is an American former professional football player who was a center in the National Football League (NFL). He was selected by the Cleveland Browns in the third round of the 2002 NFL draft. He played college football for the Maryland Terrapins.

Fowler has been a member of the Minnesota Vikings, Buffalo Bills, Arizona Cardinals, Detroit Lions and Florida Tuskers.

== Early life ==
Fowler was an All-county and All-Long Island selection as a defensive lineman at Half Hollow Hills High School West in Dix Hills, New York, where he was chosen Long Island’s top lineman in a poll of area coaches. He was also a finalist for the 1996 Bob Zellner Award. He was a three-sport standout who also excelled in basketball and lacrosse.

== College career ==
Fowler did not allow a quarterback sack in the four years as a starter at the University of Maryland. He took over center duties in his redshirt freshman year, despite having practiced at that position for only 10 days before earning the starting job. He was a model of consistency, as he started every game (44) he played in for Maryland.

== Professional career ==
=== Cleveland Browns ===
Fowler was selected in the 2002 NFL draft by the Cleveland Browns. In his rookie season with the Browns he was the backup center behind Dave Wohlabaugh and made his first career start at center against Tampa Bay, filling in for an injured Wohlabaugh. He dressed but did not play in three contests and was inactive for the remaining 12 regular season games and the AFC wild card game at Pittsburgh.

In 2003, his second season with the Browns, he provided depth at both the guard and center positions and ended up appearing in 14 games, including 10 starts. He started three games at left guard and started seven games at center. He began the season as the starting LG for the first three games.

Fowler played in 15 games for the Browns in 2004.

=== Minnesota Vikings ===
Fowler was traded to the Minnesota Vikings for the 2005 season where he played in 10 games.

=== Buffalo Bills ===
Fowler was signed by the Buffalo Bills on March 21, 2006. He started his first 32 games with the team as their center, replacing Trey Teague, before starting 5 of 16 games in 2008, sharing time with Duke Preston He became a free agent in the 2009 offseason.

=== Arizona Cardinals ===
Fowler was signed by the Arizona Cardinals on August 4, 2009, after the team waived center Donovan Raiola. He was waived on September 4, 2009.

=== Detroit Lions ===
Fowler was signed by the Detroit Lions on November 17, 2009. He was waived on December 23.

=== Current career ===
VIP at TAO - Las Vegas
