= Half Hollow Hills Central School District =

School district in the U.S. state of New York

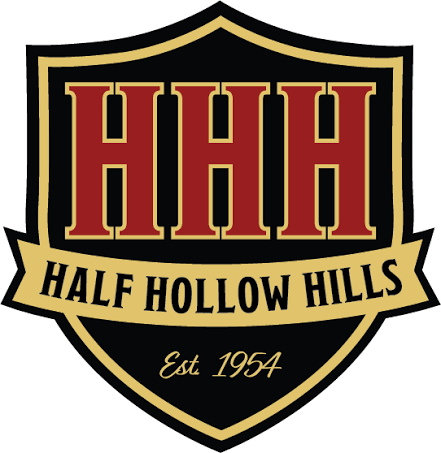

Address
- 525 Half Hollow Road Dix Hills, Suffolk County, New York, 11746; United States
- Coordinates: 40°47′46″N 73°21′25″W

District information
- Type: Public
- Motto: Perfectly blending academics, athletics, and the arts
- Grades: K–12
- Superintendent: John O’Farrell
- Asst. superintendent(s): Jeffery Woodberry, Diana Ketcham, Anne Marie Marrone Caliendo, John O'Farrell, Gwyneth Seelinger, Mia Barkan, Elizabeth Biyoukaghai
- Accreditation: New York State Education Department
- Schools: two high schools, two middle schools, five elementary schools
- Budget: $222 million (2012–13)

Students and staff
- Enrollment: 7,317 (as of 2022–23)
- Faculty: 647.3 FTEs
- Student–teacher ratio: 11.3:1

Other information
- Website: www.halfhollowhills.k12.ny.us

Half Hollow Hills Central School District (#5) is a school district in the towns of Huntington and Babylon in Suffolk County, New York on Long Island, and primarily serves the vast majority of the hamlets Dix Hills and Melville, while also serving all of Wheatley Heights and some parts of East Farmingdale, Deer Park, West Hills, and South Huntington. The district includes five elementary, two middle, and two high schools.

As of the 2022–23 school year, the district, consisting of nine schools, had an enrollment of 7,317 students and 647.3 classroom teachers (on an FTE basis), for a student–teacher ratio of 11.3:1.

== Schools ==
The district has two high schools (East and West), two middle schools (Candlewood and West Hollow), and five elementary schools (Otsego, Paumanok, Signal Hill, Sunquam and Vanderbilt).

=== Elementary schools ===
In the district's history, there were as many as 11 operating elementary schools. The first to close was Sweet Hollow in the 1970s. In the early 1980s, Taukomas, The Hills School, and Manasquan closed due to declining enrollment. Manasquan became the district's central office building (later renamed as Fran Greenspan Administration Center) and fed to Burr's Lane Junior High School (also closed, eventually becoming part of the Five Towns College campus in the early 1990s). Vanderbilt, Otsego, and Forest Park used to all feed to Candlewood, which feeds to High School West. Signal Hill, Chestnut Hill, Paumonok, and Sunquam used to all feed to West Hollow, which feeds to High School East. Sunquam re-opened in 1999 after being closed since 1991. It underwent extensive renovations and an expansion, and is located across the street from the Melville branch of Half Hollow Hills Community Library. Chestnut Hill and Forest Park closed in 2014, eliminating one school from each high school's tracks.

The retired school district logo used from 1954 to 2025

=== Middle schools ===
==== Candlewood Middle School ====
Candlewood Middle School is located in Dix Hills, and had 706 students enrolled for the 2024-2025 school year. Candlewood encourages equality amongst its students to promote diversity. The school is unique for having a circular shaped building, and a huge library. Candlewood has a giant running track that's used for gym and public use. Middle school students from grades 6 and 7 will most likely go here for summer school.

==== West Hollow Middle School ====
West Hollow Middle School, which opened in 1970, is located in Melville. It is the largest middle school in the district, with 968 students for the 2024-2025 school year. West Hollow has many options for free time like Library, Makerspace, and Cove. West Hollow has a giant running track that's used for gym and public use. Elementary school students from grades 3-5 will most likely go here for summer school.

=== High schools ===
==== Half Hollow Hills East High School ====
High School East is located at 50 Vanderbilt Parkway in Dix Hills, New York, Hills East is fed from West Hollow Middle School and is the larger of the district's two high schools. The class of 1978 was the last class where East was the exclusive high school in the district; commencing in 1979 there were graduating classes from both high schools.

High School East features a domed planetarium that houses a Evans & Sutherland digital projection system that is generally used to host class trips from the middle and elementary schools.

High School East is home to the Eugene Orloff Auditorium, a two-level theater boasting a seating capacity of 2200, making it the second largest not-for-profit auditorium on Long Island. The stage is a full Broadway-sized stage (88 feet wide, 49 feet deep, three stories tall for fly space (hanging scenery). The stage has an orchestra pit containing two pistons (although only one functions) that are capable of raising and lowering the pit.

==== Half Hollow Hills West High School ====
High School West, also known as Hills West, is located at 375 Wolf Hill Road in Dix Hills, New York. The school was built in 1975 and in its first year was 10th grade only, for class of '78. After its first year of classes, the district was split and the two high schools became typical 10, 11, 12 grade each. The school grounds of High School West are adjacent to those of Signal Hill Elementary School; however, students from Signal Hill Elementary School attend High School East rather than High School West. West students generally attend Candlewood Middle School from 6th to 8th grade. As of January 2026, Michael Catapano serves as the principal of Hills West.

Hills West has been successful in a variety of sports including Cross Country, Track, Football, Baseball, Basketball, Soccer, Swim, Dance, and Volleyball. In 2008, the Cross Country team won the Suffolk County A Championship. In 2009, they once again won the Suffolk County A Championship, however a disqualification of one of the runners led them to take second place. The winter track team won 7 straight county titles (2005, 2006, 2007, 2008, 2009, 2010, 2011) and in the spring of 2007, 2008 and 2009 the spring track team has won the league by going undefeated. In addition, the Colts have fielded strong baseball teams over the years, winning multiple league titles, two county championships, and a state championship in 2003 under the coaching Thomas Migliozzi who recently accomplished his 500th win as the head coach. The Varsity Boys Basketball team has won 4 Suffolk County AA championships (2008, 2010, 2011, and 2016) And won back to back Long Island Championships (2010 and 2011). The first time that has been accomplished in school history. In 2009, the Football team also won its first Long Island Championship in school history. The Boys Basketball team has made the class AA playoffs every year since 2006. Former Head Coach Bill Mitaritonna was named Newsday's HS Basketball Coach of the Year (2010). The Varsity Soccer team made the state semi-finals in 2007 and won the Long Island Championship in 2017. The Hills Swim team has gone undefeated and won league and county champs. The Varsity Football Team has made the playoffs the past 5 of 8 years and were the 2009 Long Island Champions and the 2018 Long Island Champions. In 2014, The Hills West Varsity Softball team won its first ever Suffolk County Championship with a 22–4 record. Hills West Dance team, the Wranglerettes, are the 2007 champions in the Long Island Kickline Association competition, winning in the jazz category for the 14th year, and in the newly created hip hop category. The official school mascot is the Colt. The school's colors are red and gold.

== Administration ==
The Fran Greenspan Administration Center (formerly known as the Manasquan building) houses the central offices of the Half Hollow Hills School District. It is located at 525 Half Hollow Road, directly adjacent to the southern end of the High School East campus. In addition to housing the offices of the Superintendent and other administrators, Central Office serves as the location for a small mock-astronautics program for children and certain community events, as well as child care services. Reach CYA is also housed in the Central Office Location.

== Notable alumni ==
- Sal Agostinelli, East, baseball player and International Scouting Director for the Philadelphia Phillies.
- Levent Alpöge, West '10, mathematician at Harvard University and Anthropic
- Gary Bettman, '70, commissioner of the National Hockey League
- Stephen Bowen, West '02, professional football player
- Raymond Enners, '63, U.S. Military Academy '67; killed in Vietnam War (1st Lt., platoon leader); awarded Distinguished Service Cross posthumously
- Joseph Filardi, West '25, college football and lacrosse player for the Syracuse Orange
- Melvin Fowler, West '97, professional football player
- Tobias Harris, West '10, professional basketball player
- Joe Jones, West '83, basketball head coach at Boston University
- Mark LoMonaco of The Dudley Boyz, East '90s, pro wrestler
- Ralph Macchio, West '79, actor, The Karate Kid
- Kyle Merber, West '08, professional runner
- James Metzger, East '77, businessman and philanthropist
- Greg Mottola, East '82, writer-director of Superbad and Adventureland
- Srihari S. Naidu, physician
- Cameron Ocasio, West '17, actor known for the leading role in Sam & Cat
- Todd Phillips, West, filmmaker & actor
- Michael Prywes, writer-director
- Jenna Rose, East '16, singer and musician
- Ryan Star, West '96, rock singer-songwriter
- Northern State, West '90s, hip hop trio
- Debbie Wasserman Schultz, East '84, politician
- Judd Winick, East '88, artist, writer, reality-TV personality and creator of The Life and Times of Juniper Lee
- Lester Mackey, West '03, mathematician
