= Milton Richman =

American journalist (1922–1986)

Milton Richman (January 29, 1922 – June 9, 1986) was an American sports columnist and sports editor for United Press International. He was named the 1981 winner of the J. G. Taylor Spink Award by the Baseball Writers' Association of America.

== Biography ==
During World War II, Richman played in the minor league organization of the St. Louis Browns.

=== United Press International ===
He spent 42 years with United Press International, one of only two jobs he had during his working career. He became a columnist in 1964, and continued to write his sports column after UPI named him as its sports editor from 1972 to 1985. In 1987, Richman was honored by the Press Club of Atlantic City with the National Headliner Award. In both 1957 and 1981, he received nominations for the Pulitzer Prize.

On December 9, 1986, six month after Richman's death, Tommy Lasorda and Sparky Anderson became the first recipients of the Milton Richman Memorial Award, established by the Association of Professional Baseball Players of America to honor "the person or persons doing the most to help former baseball people in need."

=== Personal ===
Richman died at age 64 on June 9, 1986, of a heart attack. He was survived by his brother, Arthur Richman, who also worked as a sportswriter, and later in the front offices of both the New York Mets and New York Yankees.
