= Raymond Enners =

US military officer and champion high-school lacrosse player 1945–1968

Raymond J. Enners
- Born: November 5, 1945; Rockville Centre, New York, U.S.
- Died: September 18, 1968 (aged 22); South Vietnam
- Military career
- Allegiance: United States of America
- Branch: United States Army
- Service years: 1967–1968
- Rank: First Lieutenant
- Units: 1st Battalion, 11th Infantry Brigade
- Conflicts: Vietnam War †
- Awards: Distinguished Service Cross; Bronze Star Medal; Purple Heart

Lt. Raymond J. Enners (November 5, 1945 – September 18, 1968) was an officer in the United States Army and a champion high-school lacrosse player. He attended and played for the United States Military Academy at West Point before serving in the army during the Vietnam War where he was killed in action. He received several posthumous awards for his service and several lacrosse awards are given out yearly in his honor.

== Biography ==
=== Early life ===
Ray Enners was born into an athletic family. His father, also named Raymond, played football for a semi-pro team in Farmingdale, New York. Ray Enners attended Half Hollows High School in Dix Hills, New York. During his time at Half Hollows, he served as captain of the football, basketball and lacrosse teams. He excelled in lacrosse, fondly nicknamed "The Machine" by his teammates. During his senior year, he was an All-County, All Long Island and Honorable Mention All-American. He played varsity lacrosse for five-years and played in the first five Suffolk County championships.

Enners continued to play lacrosse while he attended the United States Military Academy, from which he graduated in 1967. He was the 1967 NCAA/USILA Honorable Mention All-American.

Enners was inducted posthumously into the Suffolk Sports Hall of Fame on Long Island in the Lacrosse Category with the Class of 1991.

=== Vietnam War and death ===
On September 18, 1968, Lt. Enners was serving as platoon leader with Company A, 1st Battalion, 11th Infantry Brigade, Americal Division in a combat sweep near the village of Ha Thanh in South Vietnam. His platoon was outflanked and ambushed by a camouflaged People's Army of Vietnam (PAVN) squad amongst the hills while they crossed a small valley. A leader of Enners' squad was severely wounded and fell within twenty meters of the PAVN. The squad leader called for help, and Lt. Enners attempted to rescue him despite strong enemy fire.

Lt. Enners advanced his position from one hundred meters back to a dike that sheltered his forward squad twenty meters shy of the wounded squad leader. He dispersed his men to provide cover fire at the hostiles. He and another squad leader then made it to within ten meters of the wounded squad leader. The PAVN lobbed grenades at them and forced them back to the dike. Lt. Enners continued to maneuver his men closer to the enemy so they could provide better cover. He then ran into the crossfire to reach the wounded squad leader. After reaching him, Lt. Enners applied first aid and picked him up to bring him to the medics. When Lt. Enners was within fifteen meters of the enemy, a PAVN machine gun barrage killed him.

In 2016, Richard Enners authored the book "Heart of Gray", the story about his brother, Lt. Raymond J. Enners, Alpha Company, 1-20th Infantry, 11th Brigade and his courage and sacrifice in Vietnam.

== Military awards received ==
Enners received the Distinguished Service Cross, the Bronze Star Medal, and the Purple Heart posthumously for his service in South Vietnam. His name is listed on the Vietnam War Memorial and one of the athletic hallways at West Point is named in his memory.

== Lacrosse awards named after Lt. Enners ==
- The Lt. Raymond Enners Award is presented by the United States Intercollegiate Lacrosse Association to the NCAA National Player of the Year in men's lacrosse.
- The Lt. Ray Enners Award is given by the Suffolk County Coaches Association to the top boys' high school player in Suffolk County, Long Island, each year.
- The Lt. Enners–Chris Pettit Award is given to the Army Offensive MVP each season.
