= Arthur Richman =

- Born: 1925; United States
- Died: March 25, 2009 (aged 83–84); United States
- Occupation: Sports journalist
- Writing career
- Language: English
- Genre: Sports journalism

Arthur Richman (c. 1925 – March 25, 2009) was an American baseball sportswriter in New York City at a newspaper who become a sports executive, working in the front office of both the New York Mets and New York Yankees.

== Biography ==
He was hired by the New York Daily Mirror in 1942, starting as a copy boy. He worked his way up the ladder, becoming a baseball reporter, writing a popular column called "The Armchair Manager".

After the paper closed as a result of the 1962 New York City newspaper strike, Richman was hired by the nascent New York Mets, initially as director of promotions, and later publicity director. He became the team's traveling secretary in 1980 and served in that post until 1988 after making remarks critical of players regarding the share of postseason monies that he was allocated by players. In a 1994 interview, he stated that Nelson Doubleday, Jr., then an owner of the team, had made anti-Semitic statements in his presence.

He was hired by the New York Yankees as their vice president of media relations in May 1989, replacing Harvey Greene. Asked by George Steinbrenner to prepare a list of candidates to succeed Buck Showalter, Richman included Sparky Anderson, Davey Johnson, Tony La Russa and Joe Torre. Anderson was happily retired at the time, and Johnson and La Russa were about to sign contracts with the Baltimore Orioles and St. Louis Cardinals, respectively. Richman had known Torre from his time at the Mets when Torre was leading the team from the dugout. Newspapers were critical of the choice of Torre, who had won only one pennant in his prior 14 years as manager, and after Steinbrenner saw the printed comments, he asked Richman "Do you know what you're doing?"; he responded "If I don't, fire me".

In a statement released after Richman's death, Yankees owner George Steinbrenner described how "Arthur Richman made baseball and the New York Yankees an enormous part of his life, and I am grateful for his contributions both personally and professionally" noting that he was "someone the world of baseball will find impossible to replace".

=== Personal ===
His brother, Milton Richman, was also a sportswriter, and was inducted into the Writers' Wing of the National Baseball Hall of Fame and Museum in 1981. His brother died in 1986.

Richman died in his sleep at age 83 on March 25, 2009.
