= NC State Wolfpack men's lacrosse =

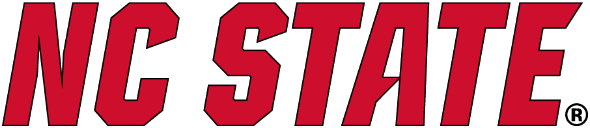
- Founded: 1973 (dissolved 1982; 43 years ago)
- University: NC State University
- Location: Raleigh, North Carolina
- Conference: Atlantic Coast Conference
- Nickname: Wolfpack
- Colors: Red and white

NCAA Tournament appearances
- 1979–1982

The NC State Wolfpack men's lacrosse team represented North Carolina State University in NCAA Division I men's lacrosse from 1973 to 1982 and currently represents the university in the Southeast Lacrosse Conference. The team was disbanded as a varsity sport after the 1982 season. The team currently competes in the Men's Collegiate Lacrosse Association Division I.

== History ==
The first Wolfpack team, initially granted club status, was introduced in 1972 by Colonel Robert E. Conroy, a military science instructor. Conroy played college lacrosse at the University of Massachusetts Amherst from 1954 to 1956. The next year NC State approved varsity status, and began playing against a mix of club and varsity programs, ending with a record of 3–9. That year Colonel Conroy was transferred leaving a vacancy in the coaching position. His successor, Dr. Charles E. Patch, had never coached or seen a full game but did graduate from SUNY Cortland, one of the nation's premier lacrosse programs.

With a new coach and only 4 of the 19 team members having lacrosse experience, the team went 1–13. After records of 7–7 and 8–8 in 1975 and 1976 respectively, the program began to gain some measure of success. In 1977 the team vaulted into the limelight of Division I college lacrosse with the recruitment of three time first-team All-American Stan Cockerton, who still ranks second in all-time NCAA career goals. That year the Wolfpack finished 10–4 with a No. 14 national ranking. Success continued the next year as NC State defeated perennial powerhouses North Carolina and Virginia to end up with a 9–4 record and a No. 9 national ranking. After that year, Dr. Patch resigned to continue the growth of the program, and ex-Virginia assistant coach Larry Gross was hired to take over. The Wolfpack would follow with an 8–4 record, a No. 6 national ranking, and its first and only NCAA tournament appearance.

The tournament culminated in an early first round exit to eventual National Champion Johns Hopkins. In the next three years the team would go 6–5 in 1980, 7–4 and a No. 11 national rank in 1981, and finally 5–6 in the 1982 season. The team lost varsity status following 1982. Future national champion Tim Nelson was on the Wolfpack squad that final season, transferring to Syracuse where he led the team to a National Title in 1983.

Lacrosse was removed as a varsity sport due to several reasons as stated by the Athletic Department, including Title IX considerations. At the time of dropping the sport, there were no high school teams playing lacrosse in North Carolina and the recruiting would have to be done out of state. The only D1 programs in the state were UNC and Duke and the travel budget was very small. But the biggest factor in eliminating the sport was the lack of scholarships, without which the team could not competitively compete in the ACC. However Title IX compliance stands in the way of reinstating the program and the sport remains as a club team today playing in the Atlantic Lacrosse Conference of the MCLA.

Due to the expansion of the game throughout the country, there has been much more attention placed into the eventual reestablishment of the program as a varsity-level sport. However, funds remain an issue. As stated by former NC State Athletic Director Debbie Yow, "I have a personal appreciation for the sport of lacrosse. That said, I can not foresee a time when we would voluntarily add any sport. The current 23 varsity sports need and deserve our attention and financial support."

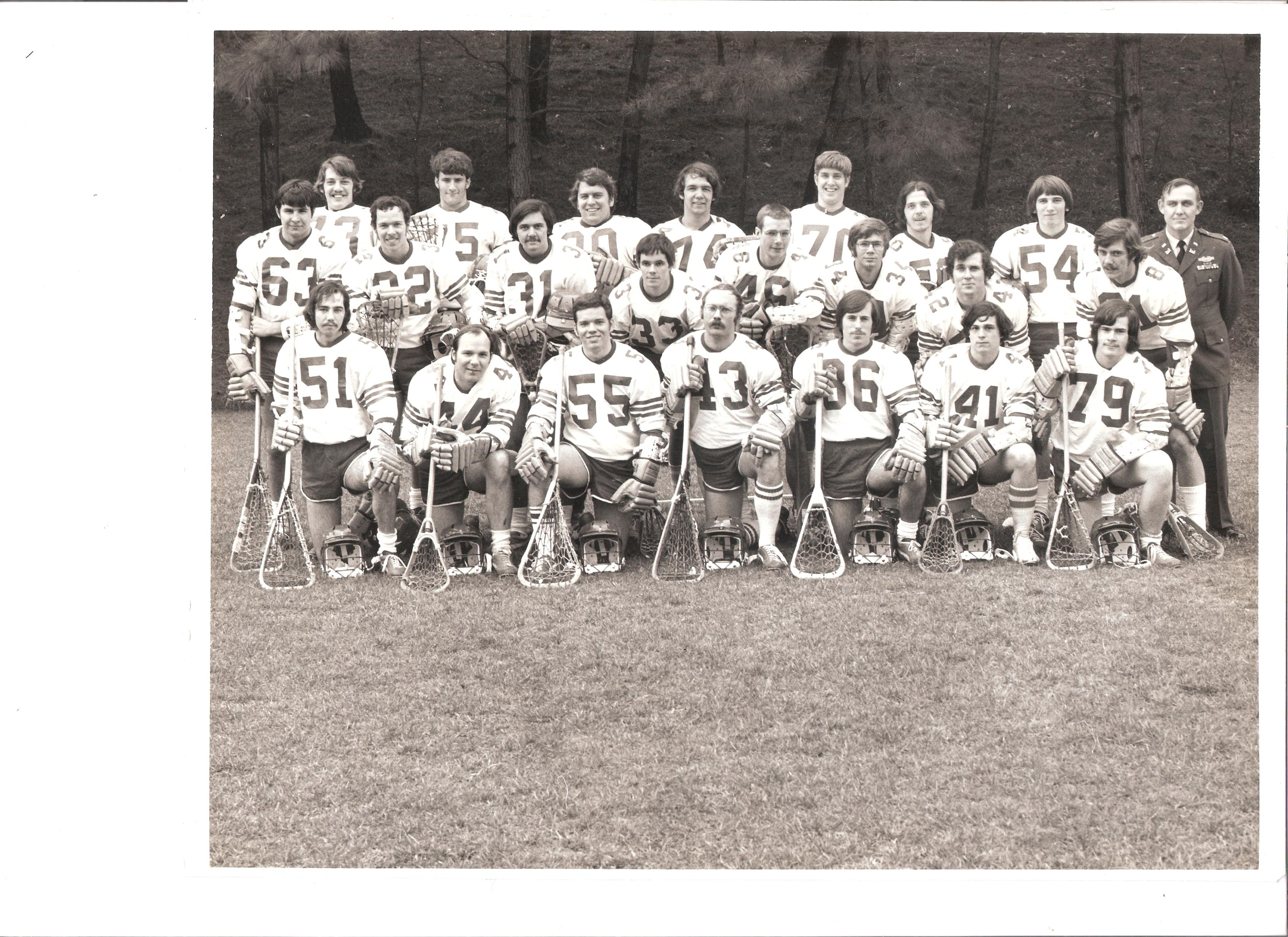
1972 NCSU Lacrosse Team

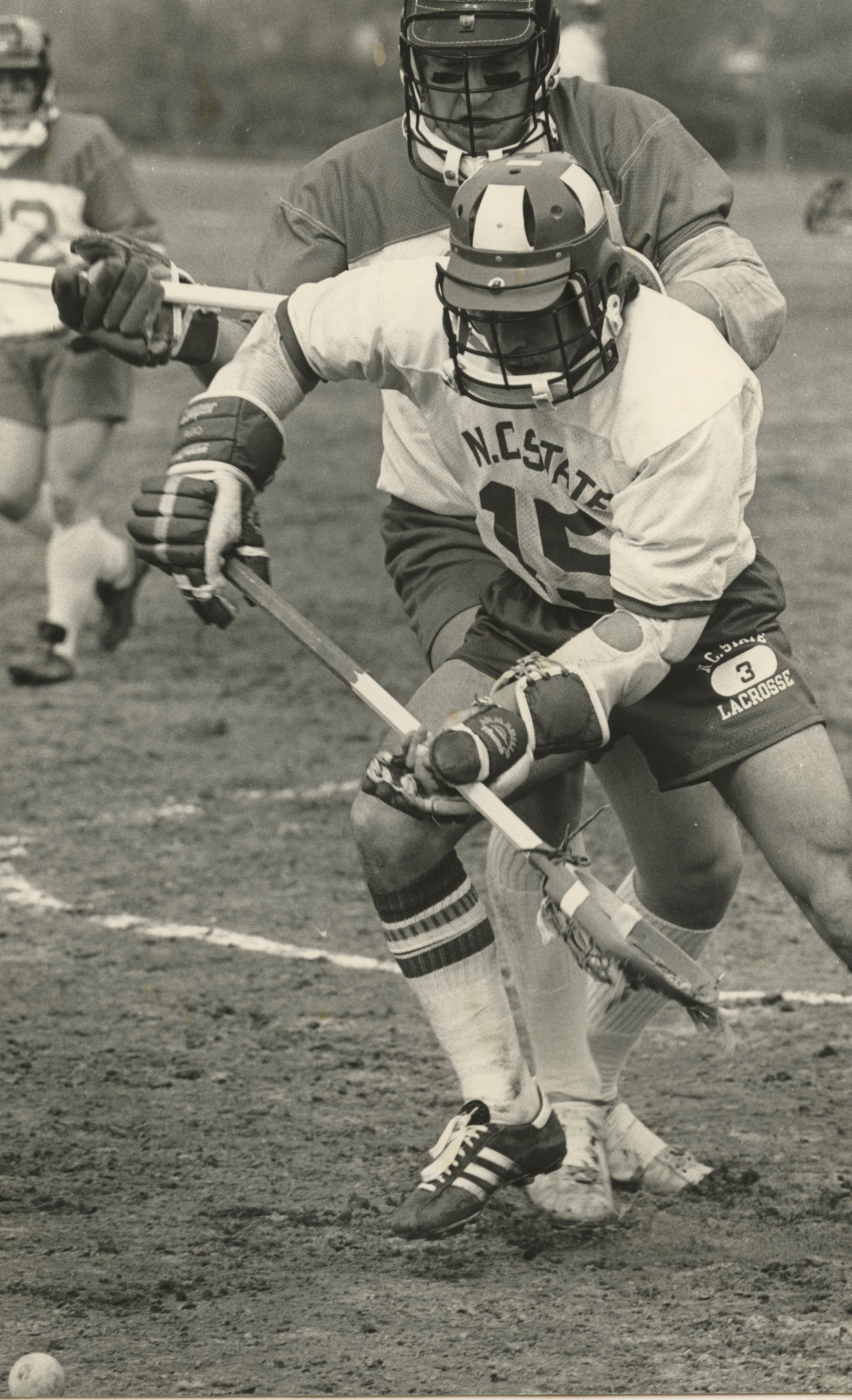
Stan Cockerton fights for a groundball.

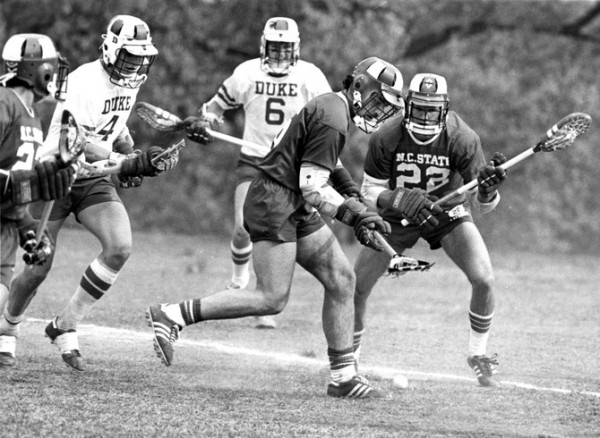
NC State playing against Duke Blue Devils men's lacrosse while still under varsity status.

== Season Results ==
The following is a list of NC State's results by season as an NCAA Division I program:

Season	Coach	Overall	Conference	Standing	Postseason
Robert Conroy (Atlantic Coast Conference) (1973–1974)
1973	Robert Conroy	3–8	0–2	5th	
Robert Conroy:		3–8 (.273)	0–2 (.000)		
Charles Patch (Atlantic Coast Conference) (1974–1978)
1974	Charles Patch	1–10	0–2	5th	
1975	Charles Patch	3–7	0–2	5th	
1976	Charles Patch	5–8	0–2	5th	
1977	Charles Patch	7–4	1–1	T–2nd	
1978	Charles Patch	7–4	3–1	2nd	
Charles Patch:		23–33 (.411)	4–8 (.333)		
Larry Gross (Atlantic Coast Conference) (1979–1982)
1979	Larry Gross	8–4	2–2	3rd	NCAA Division I Quarterfinals
1980	Larry Gross	6–5	2–2	T–3rd	
1981	Larry Gross	7–4	1–3	4th	
1982	Larry Gross	5–6	1–3	4th	
Larry Gross:		26–19 (.578)	6–10 (.375)		
Total:		52–60 (.464)			
National champion Postseason invitational champion Conference regular season champion Conference regular season and conference tournament champion Division regular season champion Division regular season and conference tournament champion Conference tournament champion

== See also ==
- 1979 NCAA Division I Men's Lacrosse Championship
- Stan Cockerton
- Tim Nelson
- J. R. Castle
