= Acrisure Amphitheater =

Outdoor amphitheater in Grand Rapids, Michigan, U.S.

Coordinates: 42.9595°N 85.6763°W

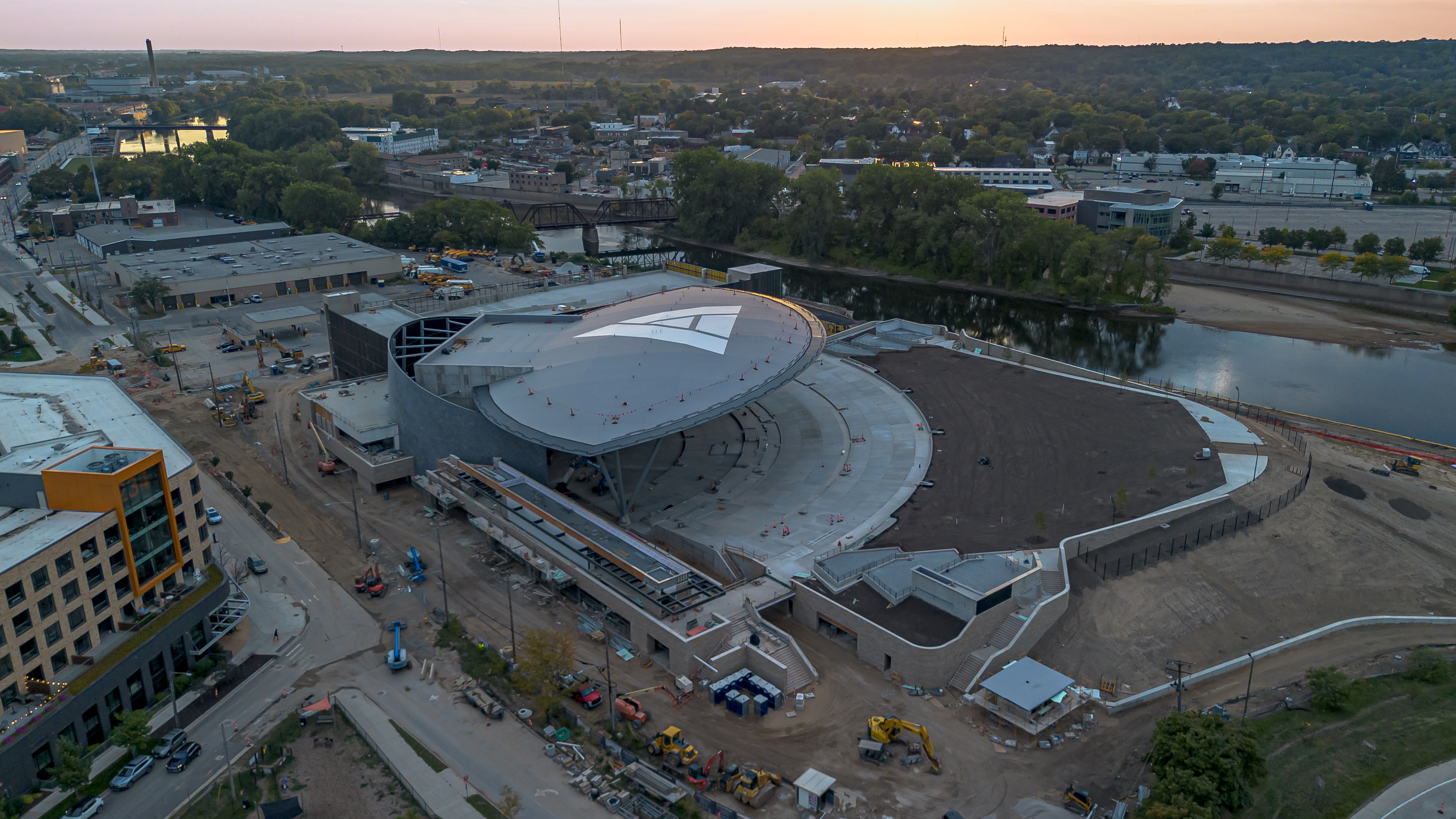
- Acrisure Amphitheater under construction in 2025
- Address: 201 Market Ave. SW; Grand Rapids, Michigan 49503
- Owner: Grand Rapids-Kent County Convention/Arena Authority
- Operator: Legends Global
- Capacity: 12,000

Construction
- Groundbreaking: May 2024
- Built: 2024–2026
- Opened: May 15, 2026
- Cost: $184 million (planned cost, 2023)

Website
- acrisureamphitheater.com

Acrisure Amphitheater is a 12,000 seat outdoor amphitheater in Grand Rapids, Michigan that opened in May 2026.

== History ==
After the City of Grand Rapids determined it would move its fleet of municipal vehicles from 201 Market Avenue in 2017, various proposals for the 15.6 acres (6.3 ha) of property were presented. Such proposals included a senior living community and a soccer stadium though city planners initially approved of a proposal from Flaherty & Collins that pitched apartment highrises for families of various incomes, a grocery store, a luxury hotel and a plaza. The plan was abandoned in 2020, however, after Flaherty & Collins did not receive tax incentives.

In February 2021, a proposal from the Grand Action 2.0 group, whose members include Carol Van Andel and Dick DeVos, included developing 30 acres (12 ha) alongside the Grand River in downtown and had a concept of an amphitheater being located on the 201 Market Avenue site. On September 22, 2023, it was unveiled that the amphitheater project was moving forward after insurance broker Acrisure was given naming rights following their gift of $30 million towards the $184 million budgeted construction costs; the venue was subsequently named Acrisure Amphitheater.

City leaders expressed confidence that the project would break ground in Spring 2024 and be completed for its first events in 2026.

== Overview ==
The open-air amphitheater, located at 201 Market Avenue and currently owned by the city, is the embodiment of a state-of-the-art performance space for professional artists. It showcases local talent and draws national artists to the City. The Grand Rapids-Kent County Convention Arena Authority has ownership and management authority. The venue includes a number of seating options to accommodate different budgets. These options include grass and fixed seats, upper and lower concourses, suites, a terrace, and a VIP pavilion. Customers have access to outdoor-seating dining and shopping options just next to the Market Avenue plaza. The almost 4-acre "Green Ribbon" along the river will smoothly include the amphitheater, which is surrounded by plenty of flora. Moreover, the facility includes an environment akin to a public park, enabling both official and casual events.

== Controversy ==
The amphitheater has also drawn controversy due to noise complaints from residents, with some residents saying they were hearing noise pollution from up to 5 miles away. The amphitheater has received an exemption from city noise ordinances with at least one resident reporting that he had been told by the Grand Rapids Police Department that "We don't take noise complaints on the amphitheater." In August 2026, a Judge ruled that the Acrisure Amphitheatre must comply with City noise ordinances. However, in October, the city commission voted unanimously to provide an exemption.
