= Managing general agent =

Business entity in the insurance industry

In insurance, a managing general agent is defined legally as "an individual or business entity appointed by an underwriting insurer to solicit applications from agents for insurance contracts or to negotiate insurance contracts on behalf of an insurer and, if authorized to do so by an insurer, to effectuate and countersign insurance contracts". (This particular wording is from Kentucky Revised Statutes. Similar wordings can be found in the statutes of Oklahoma, Idaho, Arizona, Nevada, Wyoming, Florida, and Alabama.)

In the U.S. and Canada, managing general agents act as a "fronting" system for insurers, allowing filings to be made and proofs of insurance to be given in each other's jurisdictions.

Depending on the appointment, a managing general agent may perform one of many tasks normally performed by an insurer. These include but are not limited to, sub-contracting with independent agents for placement of business, negotiating commissions, handling claims, issuing policies, processing endorsements, collecting policy premiums or being responsible for completion of regulatory reports for state or federal agencies.

== Canada ==
In Canada, managing general agencies (MGAs) play a central role in the distribution of life and health insurance. Individual life insurance agents generally cannot contract directly with insurers; instead, they must be sponsored and appointed through an MGA or a career agency before they are permitted to solicit or place insurance policies. MGAs act as intermediaries between insurers and independent advisors, providing contracting, compliance oversight, product access, training, and administrative support.Provincial regulators note that MGAs facilitate the appointment of agents and support the regulatory requirements for licensing and ongoing supervision. Because many Canadian advisors operate independently rather than as employees of insurers, MGAs function as the primary distribution channel for life and health insurance products across the country.

== History ==
Historically, managing general agents came about when insurance companies located in the eastern United States in the late 19th and early 20th centuries, primarily in New York City, wanted to expand their markets to the western United States, but didn't have the resources to open a regional or local office. Managing General Agents filled that need by providing local resources who were able to properly underwrite the risks, service the policies, and handle claims.

As technology has evolved and many of the obstacles associated with conducting business in a distant geographic location were overcome, many insurance carriers have stopped using Managing General Agents. However, as the insurance market has hardened, carriers are now using Managing General Agents as a means to limit cost and increase profitability.
