= List of the oldest lacrosse teams =

This is a chronological list of the oldest lacrosse teams.

== 19th century ==
Year	Team	Town/City	State/County/Province	Country	League	Notes
1842	Montreal Olympic Athletic Club	Montreal	Quebec	Canada	–	defunct
1852 or 1862	Ottawa Lacrosse Club	Ottawa	Ontario	Canada	Canadian Lacrosse Association	defunct, reformed in 1980s
1856	Montreal Lacrosse Club	Montreal	Quebec	Canada	Canadian Lacrosse Association	defunct, new club formed in 2006
1867	Upper Canada College	Toronto	Ontario	Canada	Canadian Lacrosse Association	oldest high school lacrosse program in North America
1868	Mohawk Lacrosse Club	Troy	New York	United States	United States National Amateur Lacrosse Association	oldest lacrosse team in the United States
1871	Prince Rupert Lacrosse Club	Winnipeg	Manitoba	Canada	–	defunct
1876	Melbourne Lacrosse Club	Melbourne	Victoria	Australia	Victorian Lacrosse Association	defunct
1876	Stockport Lacrosse Club	Stockport	Cheshire	England	North of England Men's Lacrosse Association	oldest lacrosse club in the United Kingdom
1877	New York University	New York City	New York	United States	National College Lacrosse League	oldest collegiate lacrosse team
1877	Manhattan University	New York City	New York	United States	NCAA Division I	
1877	Harvard University	Cambridge	Massachusetts	United States	NCAA Division I	known as Harvard Lacrosse Association at founding
1877	Frontier Lacrosse Club	Alexandra	Waikato	New Zealand	–	defunct
1878	Baltimore Athletic Club	Baltimore	Maryland	United States	United States National Amateur Lacrosse Association	
1879	Cheadle Lacrosse Club	Cheadle	Cheshire	England	North of England Men's Lacrosse Association	
1879	Heaton Mersey Lacrosse Club	Heaton Moor	Cheshire	England	North of England Men's Lacrosse Association	
1882	Cambridge University Lacrosse Club	Cambridge	Cambridgeshire	England	South of England Men's Lacrosse Association	Oldest college lacrosse team in the United Kingdom
1882	Hampstead Lacrosse Club	London		England	South of England Men's Lacrosse Association	oldest in the South of England
1882	Phillips Academy Andover	Andover	Massachusetts	United States	–	One of the three oldest high school lacrosse programs in the United States
1882	Phillips Exeter Academy	Exeter	New Hampshire	United States	–	One of the three oldest high school lacrosse programs in the United States
1882	Lawrenceville School	Lawrenceville	New Jersey	United States	–	One of the three oldest high school lacrosse programs in the United States
1882	Louisville Lacrosse Club	Louisville	Kentucky	United States	–	defunct
1882	New York Lacrosse Club	New York City	New York	United States	–	defunct, also referred to as New York Amateur Lacrosse Club, and New York City
1882	Princeton University	Princeton	New Jersey	United States	NCAA Division I	
1882	Yale University	New Haven	Connecticut	United States	NCAA Division I	
1882	Druids	Baltimore	Maryland	United States	–	defunct, final game in 1902
1883	Brampton Excelsiors	Brampton	Ontario	Canada	Canadian Lacrosse Association	Longest-running amateur community-owned sports franchise in Canada
1883	Johns Hopkins	Baltimore	Maryland	United States	NCAA Division I	
1883	Adelaide Lacrosse Club	Adelaide	South Australia	Australia	South Australian Lacrosse Association	defunct
1883	Edmonton Lacrosse Club	Edmonton	Alberta	Canada	–	defunct
1883	Melbourne University Lacrosse Club	Melbourne	Victoria	Australia	Lacrosse Victoria	oldest extant lacrosse club in Australia
1883	Oldham & Werneth Lacrosse Club	Oldham	Lancashire	England	North of England Men's Lacrosse Association	
1883	Sydney Lacrosse Club	Sydney	New South Wales	Australia	New South Wales Lacrosse Association	defunct
1884	Calgary Lacrosse Club	Calgary	Alberta	Canada	–	defunct
1884	New Town Lacrosse Club	Hobart	Tasmania	Australia	–	defunct
1885	Noarlunga Lacrosse Club	Noarlunga	South Australia	Australia	South Australian Lacrosse Association	defunct
1885	Lehigh University	Bethlehem	Pennsylvania	United States	NCAA Division I	
1885	Southland Lacrosse Club	Invercargill	Southland	New Zealand	–	defunct
1886	Dunedin Lacrosse Club	Dunedin	Otago	New Zealand	–	defunct
1887	Brisbane Lacrosse Club	Brisbane	Queensland	Australia	Queensland Lacrosse Union	defunct
1887	Rutgers University	New Brunswick	New Jersey	United States	NCAA Division I	
1887	Knightsbridge Lacrosse Club	Adelaide	South Australia	Australia	South Australian Lacrosse Association	defunct
1887	North Adelaide Lacrosse Club	Adelaide	South Australia	Australia	Lacrosse South Australia	
1888	Jamestown Lacrosse Club	Jamestown	South Australia	Australia	South Australian Lacrosse Association	defunct
1888	New Westminster Salmonbellies	New Westminster	British Columbia	Canada	Western Lacrosse Association	
1888	Rochdale Lacrosse Club	Rochdale	Lancashire	England	North of England Men's Lacrosse Association	
1888	Canterbury Lacrosse Club	Christchurch	Canterbury	New Zealand	–	defunct
1888	Wellington Lacrosse Club	Wellington	Wellington	New Zealand	–	defunct
1888	City College of New York	New York City	New York	United States	National College Lacrosse League	
1889	Adelaide University Lacrosse Club	Adelaide	South Australia	Australia	Lacrosse South Australia	
1889	Poynton Lacrosse Club	Poynton	Cheshire	England	North of England Men's Lacrosse Association	name changed from Offerton Lacrosse Club in 1972
1891	New York Athletic Club	New York City	New York	United States	American Lacrosse League	oldest active lacrosse team in the United States
1891	Caulfield Lacrosse Club	Melbourne	Victoria	Australia	Lacrosse Victoria	1891–1896 Re-formed 1909
1893	Cheadle Hulme Lacrosse Club	Cheadle Hulme	Cheshire	England	North of England Men's Lacrosse Association	
1894	Crescent Athletic Club	Brooklyn	New York	United States	United States National Amateur Lacrosse Association	defunct, reformed in 2006
1895	Hobart Lacrosse Club	Hobart	Tasmania	Australia	–	defunct
1895	Holdfast Bay Lacrosse Club	Adelaide	South Australia	Australia	South Australian Lacrosse Association	defunct
1896	Ashton Lacrosse Club	Ashton-under-Lyne	Lancashire	England	North of England Men's Lacrosse Association	
1896	Phoenix Lacrosse Club	Fremantle	Western Australia	Australia	Western Australian Lacrosse Association	founded as Fremantle Lacrosse Club, name changed in 1991 after relocating
1896	Melbourne Cricket Club Lacrosse Section	Melbourne	Victoria	Australia	Lacrosse Victoria	
1896	Perth Lacrosse Club	Perth	Western Australia	Australia	Western Australian Lacrosse Association	defunct
1897	Durban Lacrosse Club	Durban	KwaZulu-Natal	South Africa	Natal Lacrosse Association	defunct
1898	Williamstown Lacrosse Club	Melbourne	Victoria	Australia	Lacrosse Victoria	
1899	Brooklands Hulmeians Lacrosse Club	Sale	Cheshire	England	North of England Men's Lacrosse Association	founded as Old Hulmeians LC and continues nominally as Lancashire club
1899	East Fremantle Lacrosse Club	Fremantle	Western Australia	Australia	Lacrosse Western Australia	
1899	East Torrens Payneham Lacrosse Club	Adelaide	South Australia	Australia	Lacrosse South Australia	founded as East Torrens Lacrosse Club
1899	Sturt Lacrosse Club	Adelaide	South Australia	Australia	Lacrosse South Australia	
1899	Woodville Lacrosse Club	Adelaide	South Australia	Australia	Lacrosse South Australia	known as Port Adelaide Lacrosse Club between 1903 and 1966

== By country ==
Country	Year	Team	City	League	Ref
Canada	1842	Montreal Olympic Athletic Club	Montreal	None	
United States	1868	Mohawk Lacrosse Club	Troy, New York	United States National Amateur Lacrosse Association	
Australia	1876	Melbourne Lacrosse Club	Melbourne	Victorian Lacrosse Association	
England	1876	Stockport Lacrosse Club	Stockport	North of England Men's Lacrosse Association	
New Zealand	1877	Frontier Lacrosse Club	Alexandra	None	
South Africa	1897	Durban Lacrosse Club	Durban	Natal Lacrosse Association	
Hong Kong	1963	Hong Kong University Lacrosse Club	Hong Kong	Hong Kong Lacrosse Association	
Czech Republic	1980	Lacrosse Club Custodes Sokol Radotín	Prague	Czech Lacrosse Union	
Japan	1987	Keio University Lacrosse Club	Tokyo	Japan Lacrosse College League	
Germany	1993	Berliner Lacrosse Verein	Berlin	Deutscher Lacrosse Verband Bundesliga Ost	
Netherlands	2000	Maastricht Lacrosse	Maastricht	Dutch National Lacrosse League	
Italy	2005	Roma Leones	Rome	Federazione Italiana Giuco Lacrosse	
Poland	2007	Poznań Hussars	Poznań	Polish Lacrosse League	
Mexico	2010	Ibero Lacrosse	Mexico City	Liga Premier Universitaria	

== See also ==
- Lacrosse
- History of Lacrosse
- Federation of International Lacrosse
