= History of lacrosse =

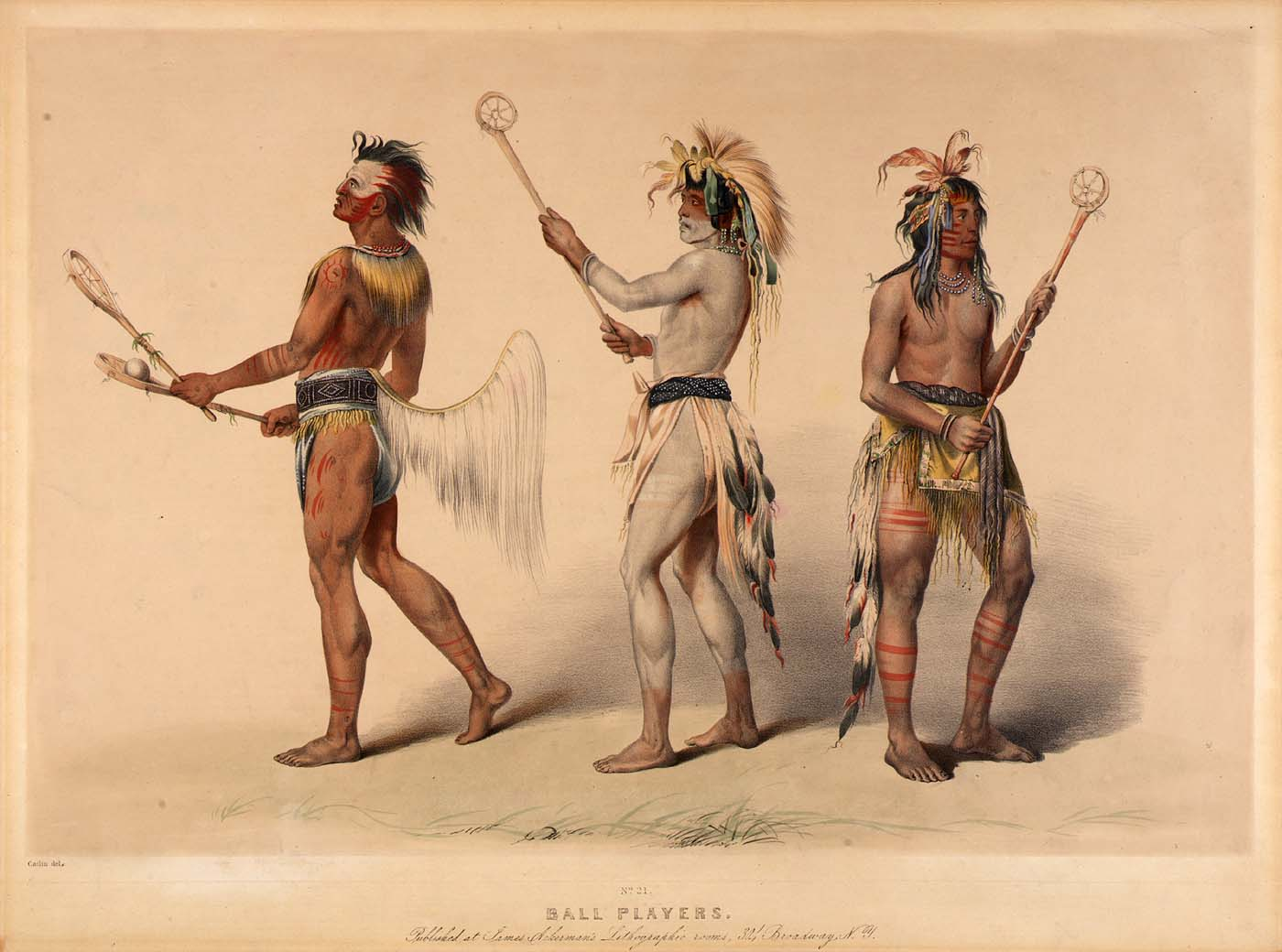
"Ball players", a hand-colored lithograph by George Catlin

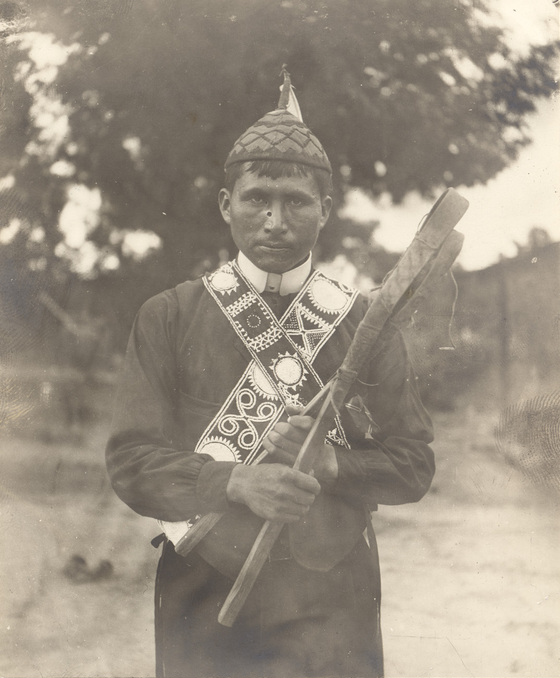
Jim Tubby, Mississippi Choctaw, preparing for a stickball game in 1908.

Lacrosse has its origins in a tribal game played primarily by Northeastern and Southeastern Indigenous nations. It was also played by some Plains Indians tribes in what is now the United States of America and Canada. The game was extensively modified by European settlers to create its current collegiate and professional form. For many Indigenous nations, lacrosse is a spiritual and cultural practice. Some nations refer to lacrosse as the “Creator’s Game,” because of how it connects tribe members and creates a sense of community.

The Indigenous game was played on a large scale sometimes involving hundreds of men. The game began with the ball being tossed into the air and the two sides rushing to catch it. Because of the large number of players involved, these games generally tended to involve a huge mob of players swarming the ball and slowly moving across the field. Passing the ball was thought of as a trick, and it was seen as cowardly to dodge an opponent. Years later lacrosse is still a popular sport played all over the world. The Indigenous people would wear their normal clothes while playing the game. Using a wooden stick, they would play the game with 100–1000 players on each team, on 1.5- to 2-kilometer fields.

== Indigenous North American game ==
Modern day lacrosse descends from and resembles games played by various Native American communities. - Different Indigenous nations and historical sources, especially those written by early European observers, tell different stories about traditional lacrosse.. There were differences in styles of lacrosse depending on the region and that is what these descriptions show. Different rules for different tribes etc. Unique forms of stickball were developed by indigenous communities which were shaped by geography, cultural traditions among other things. These include games called gajihgwaʼéʼ or dehoñtjihgwaʼéh in Onondaga ("they bump hips", pronounced "de-yoon-chee-gwa-eh"), tewa:aráton in Mohawk language ("it has a dual net", pronounced "de–wa–ah–lah–doon"), baaga`adowe in Ojibwe ("bump hips"), and Ishtaboli or kapucha toli ("little brother of war") in Choctaw.

Lacrosse is one of the oldest team sports in North America. There is evidence that a version of lacrosse originated in what is now Canada as early as the 17th century, however for Indigenous communities, the game is a tradition that has been around since time immemorial. Native American lacrosse was played throughout modern Canada, but was most popular around the Great Lakes, Mid-Atlantic seaboard, and American South.

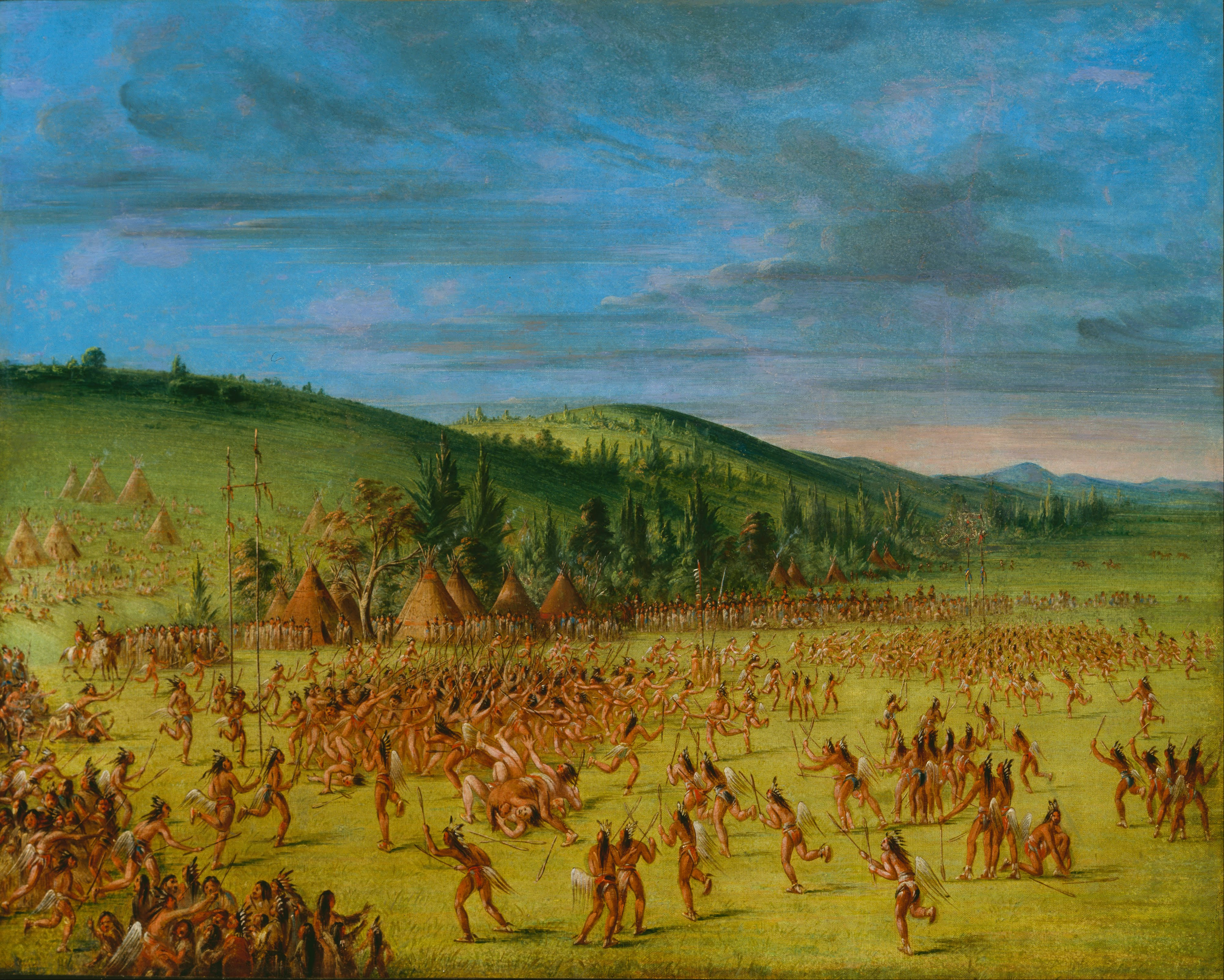
"An Indian Ball-Play" by George Catlin, circa 1846–1850, Choctaw Indians. Native American ball games often involved hundreds of players.

Traditional lacrosse games were sometimes major events that could last several days. As many as 100 to 1,000 men from opposing villages or tribes would participate. The games were played in open plains located between the two villages, and the goals could range from 500 yards (460 m) to 6 miles (9.7 km) apart.

Rules for these games were decided on the day before. Generally, there were no out-of-bounds, and the ball could not be touched with the hands. The goals would be selected as large rocks or trees; in later years wooden posts were used. Playing time was often from sunup until sundown.

Lacrosse played in the Northeast by nations such as the Haudenosaunee (Iroquois), was played with one stick, whereas Southeastern nations, such as the Cherokee played stickball (lacrosse) with two smaller sticks. This meant that Northeastern stickball relied more on passing the ball to teammates in order to score, which is similar to modern lacrosse. In contrast, Southeastern stickball relied less on passing the ball and more on throwing the ball toward the scoring pole with hopes that a teammate would reach it first to score. The larger pockets (net area) of the Northeastern stickball sticks made catching the ball easier, which was a nearly impossible task in the much smaller, shallower pockets of Southeastern stickball sticks. In the Southeastern two-stick version there were traditionally three areas of scoring on the stickball pole. There would be a mark, about chest high on the pole, which, when the ball hit above this mark, would award one point. Contact below that point was not scored. The top half of the pole, well above arms' reach, was usually worth two points when hit. The very top of the pole, usually embellished with a large figure of a fish or other sacred animal, was worth three points. In recreational games, scoring was loosely kept, most times by the audience or a few players. Games typically would reach around twenty points before concluding. The Iroquois and Great Lakes styles would use poles or goalposts. Play styles varied depending on the indigenous nation. Northeastern nations emphasized strategy like passing and working as a team using only one stick and a larger net.. In nations more south stickball was often played with two short sticks and there was a greater value placed on individual play and movement

The game began with the ball being tossed into the air and the two sides rushing to catch it. Because of the large number of players involved, these games generally tended to involve a huge mob of players swarming the ball and slowly moving across the field. Passing the ball was thought of as a trick, and it was seen as cowardly to dodge an opponent.

The medicine men acted as coaches, and the women of the tribe would usually tend to players and cheer them on as well as sang while the men played. There was also a women's version of lacrosse called amtahcha in some areas, which used much shorter sticks with larger heads. Another version that women played instead amongst the Iroquois and Eastern Woodland area was double ball. Women in some Native American nations also played traditional forms of stickball, but the rules and styles of play were very different from one community to the next.

Lacrosse traditionally had many different purposes. Some games were played to settle inter-tribal disputes. This function was essential to keeping the Six Nations of the Iroquois together. Lacrosse was also played to toughen young warriors for combat, for recreation, as part of festivals, and for the bets involved. Finally, lacrosse was played for religious reasons: "for the pleasure of the Creator," and to collectively pray for something.

=== Rituals ===
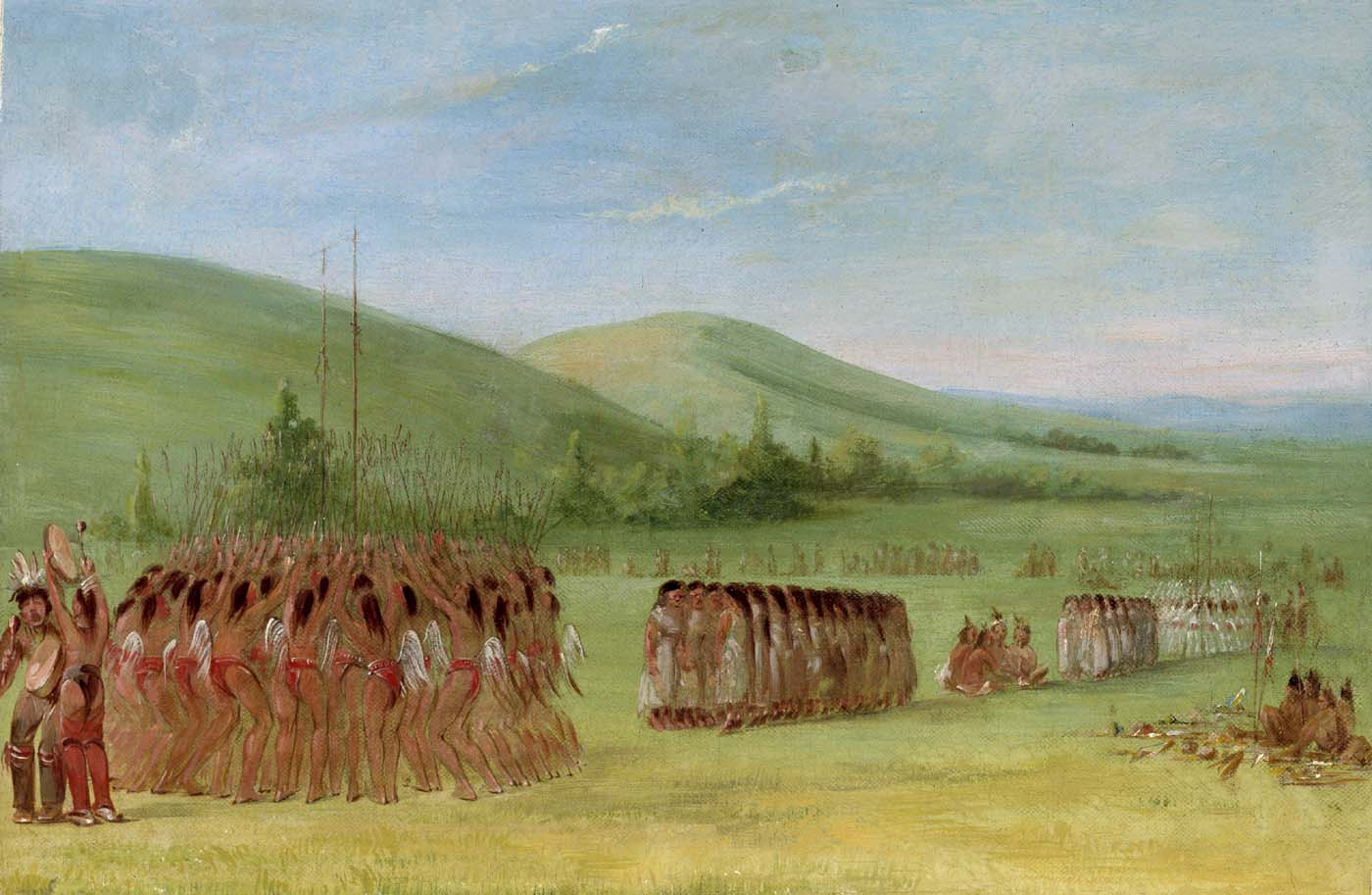
"Ball-play Dance" by George Catlin, 1834. Before the match, players and their supporters passed the night in singing, dancing, and soliciting divine support.

Pregame rituals were very similar to rituals associated with war. Players would decorate their bodies with paint and charcoal. Players also decorated their sticks or stick racks with objects representing qualities desired in the game. Strict taboos were held on what players could eat before a game, and the medicine man performed rituals to prepare players and their sticks. The night before a game, players wore ceremonial regalia and held a special dance. Sacrifices were held, and sacred expressions were yelled to intimidate opponents.

On the day of the game, teams walked to the field and were slowed by constant rituals. Sometimes players would receive ceremonial scratches on their arms or torso.

Before the game, every player was required to place a wager. Items such as handkerchiefs, knives, trinkets and horses were part of the wager. The bets would be displayed on a rack near the spectators, and items would be awarded proportionally to the winner of each quarter.

When the game was over ceremonial dance took place, along with a large feast for the hungry players.

=== Equipment ===
Some early lacrosse balls were fashioned out of wood. Others were made of deerskin stuffed with hair. They were typically three inches in diameter.

The first lacrosse sticks were essentially giant wooden spoons with no netting. - The first of the lacrosse sticks were very closely related and tied into the culture and knowledge of the craftsmen within the tribe. Sticks were made by hand from wood and were shaped and formed through a steaming process, while the netting was made from animal sinew.. More often than not designs showcased identity and could also carry spiritual or personal importance for that player. Great Lakes style sticks had one end bent into a 4-to-5-inch-diameter (100 to 130 mm) circle, which was filled with netting. This netting was made of wattup or deer sinew. The Iroquois and Eastern Woodland style sticks use a U-shape instead of a circle.

These sticks were bent into shape after being softened through steaming, and lengths typically ranged from 2 to 5 feet (1.5 m). Lacrosse sticks often had elaborate carvings on them intended to help players in the game. Lacrosse sticks were so treasured that many players requested to be buried with their stick beside them upon death.

Some versions of lacrosse used unusual stick designs. In the St. Lawrence Valley a version was played in which the head took up two thirds of the stick. In the Southwestern United States a double-stick version was played with sticks about two and a half feet long.

No protective equipment was worn in traditional lacrosse. When looking at modern day lacrosse it holds endless amounts of cultural significance for many indigenous nations. The Haudenosaunee Confederacy fields a national team that competed on the international stage, which helps to reflect the ongoing important of lacrosse. There are efforts to keep stickball active in a few nations, where lacrosse persists as a cultural practice and also a teaching vessel for younger members.

== European involvement ==
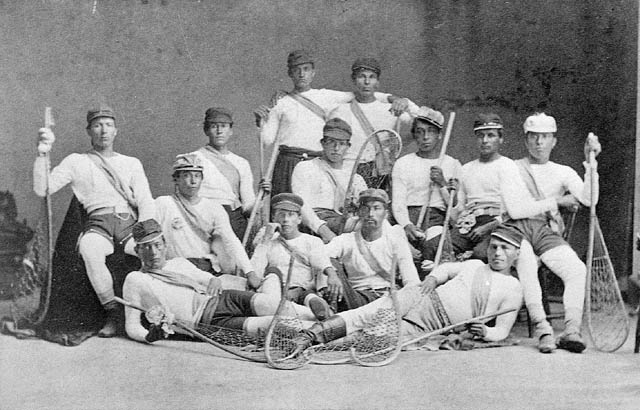
Men from the Mohawk Nation at Kahnawake (Caughnawaga) who were the Canadian lacrosse champions in 1869.

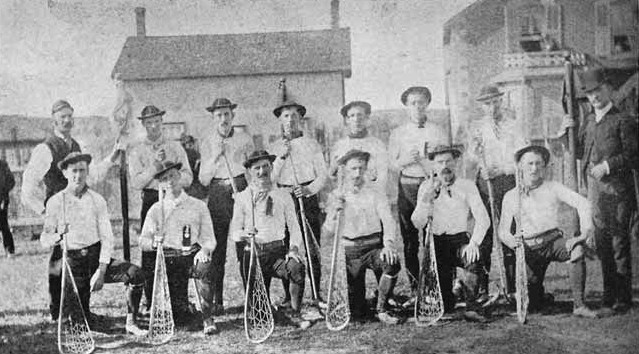
Richmond Hill "Young Canadians" lacrosse team, 1885.

The first westerners to encounter lacrosse were French Jesuit missionaries in the St. Lawrence Valley. During the 1630s, they witnessed the game and condemned it. They were opposed to lacrosse because it was violent, betting was involved, and it was part of the religion they sought to eradicate.

One missionary, Jean de Brébeuf, was the first to write about lacrosse and thus gave it its name. He described the Wendat (Huron) in present-day Ontario playing "crosse" in 1637. Some say the name originated from the French term for field hockey, le jeu de la crosse.

Despite Jesuit opposition, many other European colonists were intrigued by lacrosse. Betting on games became common, and by around 1740 many French colonists were taking up the game. However, they were unable to beat the Native Americans.

James Smith described in some detail a game being played in 1757 by his fellow tribe members "wherein they used a wooden ball, about three inches diameter, and the instrument they moved it with was a strong staff about five feet long, with a hoop net on the end of it, large enough to contain the ball."

In 1763, Ojibwas used a lacrosse game to capture Fort Michilimackinac (now Mackinaw City, Michigan). Natives invited the fort's British troops to watch a lacrosse game. The players gradually worked their way close to the gates, and then rushed into the fort and carried out a general massacre.

In 1805 during an expedition up the Mississippi River, U.S. army officer Lt. Zebulon Pike observed a group of young Ho-Chunk (also known as Winnebago) and Sioux men playing this game, or one resembling it, near the east bank of the river, in what is now west-central Wisconsin. He named the region "Prairie de la Crosse", which in turn inspired the name of both the Wisconsin county and its principal city. Today, two statues in the city of La Crosse commemorate the game observed by Pike.

In 1834 a team of Caughnawaga Indians demonstrated lacrosse in Montreal. Although response to the demonstrations was not overwhelming, interest in lacrosse steadily grew in Canada.

In 1856, William George Beers, a Canadian dentist, founded Montreal Lacrosse Club. He codified the game in 1867 to shorten the length of each game, reduce the number of players, use a redesigned stick, and use a rubber ball. The first game played under Beers' rules was at Upper Canada College in 1867. The first overseas exhibition games were played in 1867. In 1876, Queen Victoria witnessed an exhibition game and was impressed, saying "The game is very pretty to watch." Her endorsement was enough for many English girls' schools to adopt the sport in the 1890s. The Mohawk Lacrosse Club in Troy, New York, became the first organized club in the United States. With the standardization of lacrosse and its newly established clubs came the exclusion of Indigenous players. The white lacrosse clubs barred Native Americans from playing for them, which led to the establishment of all-Indigenous teams.

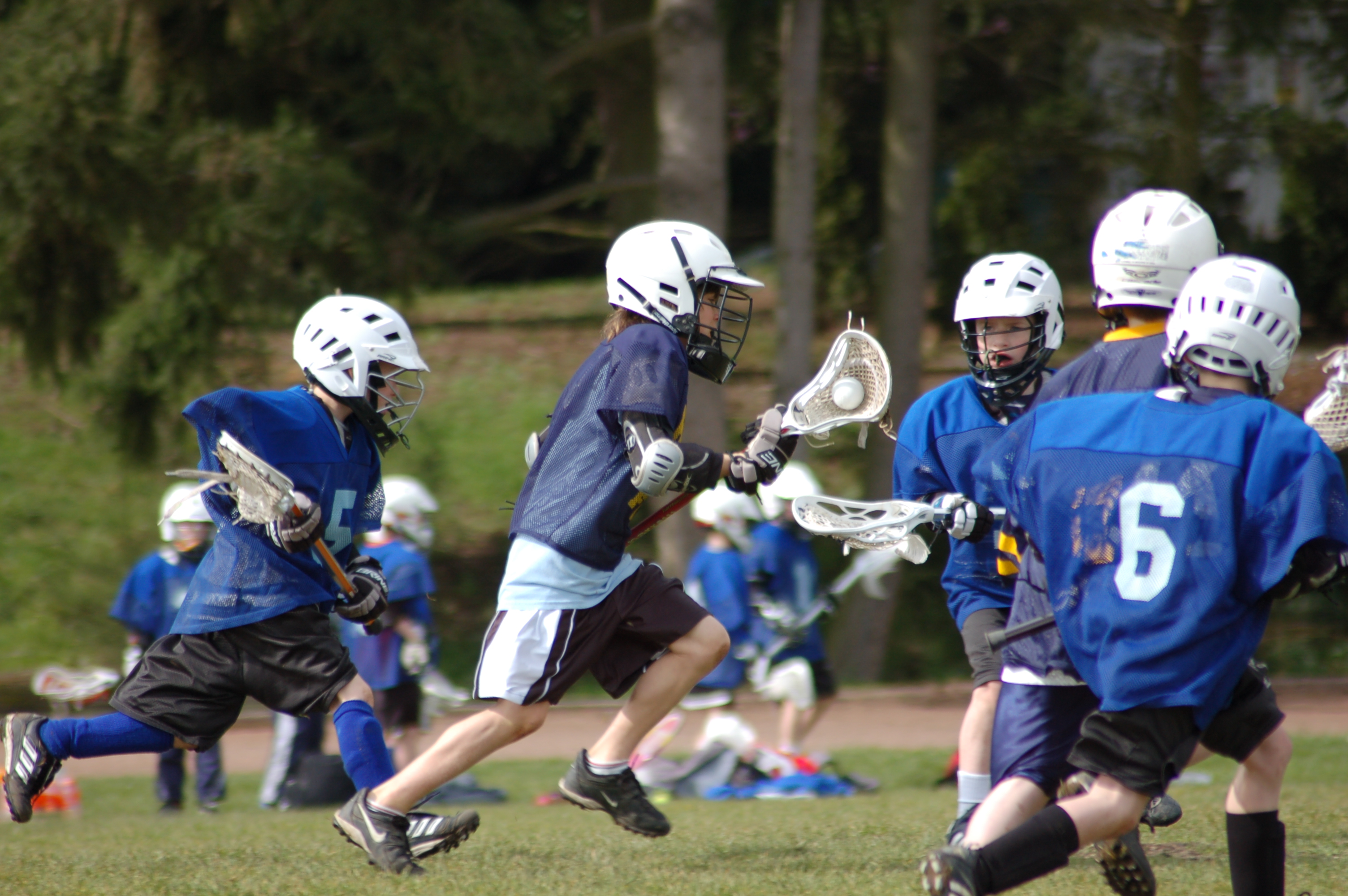
A "pee wee" game in progress

As lacrosse grew, opposition to its violent aspects was a major obstacle. The game was banned in some areas when, in 1900, Choctaw Indians attached lead weights to their sticks to use them as skull-crackers.

By the 20th century, many high schools, colleges and universities had adopted lacrosse as a league sport. Lacrosse became an Olympic sport for the 1904 and 1908 Summer Olympics, but was then dropped as an official sport. After 1908, lacrosse was a sport in the World Games.

As the institutionalization of lacrosse in the late 1800s turned it into a sport that became integral to the Canadian national identity, both Canada and the United States were doing their best to eradicate Indigenous peoples and culture through residential schools. Residential schools were created with the sole purpose of forcing cultural assimilation of Indigenous peoples by taking children and forcing them to stop practicing their traditions, speaking their language, and doing anything that the settlers viewed as 'uncivilized.' Indigenous communities are still trying to heal from the immense damage and high death toll of residential schools. At this time, lacrosse, a traditionally Indigenous practice, became a symbol of settler Canadian nationalism. In residential schools, whose purpose was to 'civilize' the Indigenous children, sports were introduced as a way to keep health up and reduce the amount of deaths. A few residential school survivors recall that sport was a break from their strenuous days, where they could just be children. The Canadian government wanted to promote Canadian nationalism through every aspect of the school, including in recreational activities such as sports, and therefore they introduced lacrosse into these schools which were trying to force disconnection from Native American culture. For many children however, lacrosse was actually a way to retain an aspect of their indigeneity and to hold onto a piece of their culture rather than it promoting a Canadian national identity.

In the 1930s, an indoor version of the game, box lacrosse, was introduced in Canada. It quickly became the dominant form of the sport in Canada, in part due to the severe winter weather that limited outdoor play.

Minor leagues developed for box lacrosse and college lacrosse. Two professional leagues also were created: In 1987 the Eagle Pro Box Lacrosse League was founded; it eventually became the Major Indoor Lacrosse League, and then the National Lacrosse League (NLL). In the summer of 2001, a professional field lacrosse league, known as Major League Lacrosse (MLL), was inaugurated. In 2019, the Premier Lacrosse League was created, which offered higher wages and better benefits for the players.

== Lacrosse today ==
Today, lacrosse is mostly popular in Canada and the United States, but also has participation in 95 other countries, Japan, the United Kingdom and Australia chief among them. Though Lacrosse is not as popular as many other sports, participation and interest is growing. US Lacrosse has reported that children in America are opting to try a different sport from what they usually have chosen; a survey shows that boys' and girls' lacrosse has grown by 47% and 43.1% respectively. In addition, the NCAA reported a 24% increase in the number of new men's lacrosse programs created in the last two decades and women's athletic department saw a 65% increase in the number of new programs created between 1998 and 2008. With the youth movement of lacrosse participation this will lead to more high school lacrosse players, then lead to more college lacrosse players, then more professional players and ultimately more interest in the sport.

Indigenous presence in lacrosse has not disappeared. Lacrosse is still an integral part of several Indigenous communities, both the traditional form of the game and modern lacrosse. Traditional two-stick stickball is still played in the Cherokee Nation and the medicine game is still played by the Haudenosaunee (Iroquois). The Haudenosaunee Nationals are an internationally ranked lacrosse team that competes at the global level as a sovereign nation separate to the United States or Canada. They travel on their nation's passports and are a global symbol for Indigenous sovereignty. In the 2010 World Lacrosse Championship, which was held in England, the issue of Indigenous sovereignty became an international conversation after the United States refused to allow the team to leave and the United Kingdom barred entry to the Haudenosaunee Nationals, saying that their Haudenosaunee passports were not valid. The U.K. stated that the players should all simply travel using their United States or Canadian passports. The team refused, asserting their nation's sovereignty, saying they would only travel on their Haudenosaunee passports, not those of a competitor. The U.S. issued a one-time waiver, allowing them to leave on their passports, however the U.K. still refused entry. The Haudenosaunee Nationals subsequently withdrew from the Lacrosse World Championship and refused to play that year.

Although lacrosse has seen a 35% surge in participation since 2012, attendance at MLL (Major League Lacrosse) games have decreased and television coverage still lags behind that of other US sports. Paul Rabil, arguably the greatest and most influential lacrosse player of all time, tried to purchase the MLL on several occasions after being tired of poor wages and low attendance at games, but was denied by the MLL. In 2018, Paul Rabil, alongside his brother Mike Rabil, created their own lacrosse league known as the PLL (Premier Lacrosse League). The brothers received financial support from the Chernin Group, which previously owned Barstool Sports, and Alibaba co-founder Joseph Tsai. The PLL also signed a contract with NBC and NBC Sports to broadcast the league games. With a $25,000 minimum salary, the PLL was able to offer players three times more than MLL salary, plus health-care benefits and equity in the league. The PLL has allowed many professional players to make lacrosse their full-time job, resulting in many MLL players migrating to the PLL. Furthermore, many college lacrosse players have chosen the PLL over the MLL and other professional leagues. Game attendance increased after the creation of the PLL. In 2019 – the PLL's first season – there were over 10,000 attendees at every weekend event, with hundreds of thousands more watching from home.

In 2021, the MLL merged with the PLL, making the latter the sole men's pro field lacrosse league in North America.

== See also ==
- Mesoamerican ballgame
- List of the oldest lacrosse teams
- Native American stickball
- College Lacrosse
- Ontario Lacrosse Association
- National Lacrosse League
