= 2015 Ken Galluccio Cup =

Tournament details
- City: (Belgium) Ghent
- Dates: 12–13 September 2015
- Teams: 12

Final positions
- Champions: (England) Stockport (3rd title)
- Runners-up: (Sweden) Farsta

The 2015 Ken Galluccio Cup was the seventh edition of the Ken Galluccio Cup, the European men's lacrosse club competition.

Stockport retained the title, achieving their third one ever.

== Competition format ==
The twelve teams were divided into four groups of three, where the two first qualified teams joined the quarterfinals.

== Group stage ==
=== Group A ===
Pos	Team	Pld	W	D	L	GF	GA	GD	Pts	Qualification	STO	BOC	VAL
1	(England) Stockport	2	2	0	0	34	1	+33	6	Qualification to quarterfinals	—	16–1	18–0
2	(Italy) Bocconi	2	1	0	1	9	20	−11	3	Qualification to quarterfinals	—	—	8–4
3	(France) Valenciennes	2	0	0	2	4	26	−22	0	Qualification to ninth position group	—	—	—

Source: Pointbench.com

=== Group B ===
Pos	Team	Pld	W	D	L	GF	GA	GD	Pts	Qualification	AMS	DUB	ZUR
1	(Netherlands) Amsterdam Lions	2	1	1	0	10	9	+1	4	Qualification to quarterfinals	—	—	—
2	(Republic of Ireland) Dublin	2	0	2	0	11	11	0	2	Qualification to quarterfinals	6–6	—	—
3	(Switzerland) Zürich Lions	2	0	1	1	8	9	−1	1	Qualification to ninth position group	3–4	5–5	—

Source: Pointbench.com

=== Group C ===
Pos	Team	Pld	W	D	L	GF	GA	GD	Pts	Qualification	FAR	VIE	BRU
1	(Sweden) Farsta	2	2	0	0	15	4	+11	6	Qualification to quarterfinals	—	6–3	9–1
2	(Austria) Vienna Monarchs	2	1	0	1	8	8	0	3	Qualification to quarterfinals	—	—	5–2
3	(Belgium) Brussels Beavers	2	0	0	2	3	14	−11	0	Qualification to ninth position group	—	—	—

Source: Pointbench.com

=== Group D ===
Pos	Team	Pld	W	D	L	GF	GA	GD	Pts	Qualification	OSL	STU	BEL
1	(Norway) Oslo	2	2	0	0	17	4	+13	6	Qualification to quarterfinals	—	5–4	12–0
2	(Germany) Stuttgart	2	1	0	1	15	7	+8	3	Qualification to quarterfinals	—	—	11–2
3	Belgium Mixed	2	0	0	2	2	23	−21	0	Qualification to ninth position group	—	—	—

Source: Pointbench.com

== Championship bracket ==
Quarter-finals
(England) Stockport	11
(Republic of Ireland) Dublin	1
(Norway) Oslo	6
(Austria) Vienna Monarchs	3
(Netherlands) Amsterdam Lions	8
(Italy) Bocconi	5
(Sweden) Farsta	9
(Germany) Stuttgart	4

Semi-finals
(England) Stockport	7
(Norway) Oslo	3
(Netherlands) Amsterdam Lions	4
(Sweden) Farsta	8

Final
(England) Stockport	9
(Sweden) Farsta	5
Third place
(Norway) Oslo	6
(Netherlands) Amsterdam	2

== Fifth-position bracket ==
Semi-finals
(Republic of Ireland) Dublin	2
(Austria) Vienna Monarchs	4
(Italy) Bocconi	6
(Germany) Stuttgart	9

Fifth position
(Austria) Vienna Monarchs	3
(Germany) Stuttgart	4
Seventh position
(Republic of Ireland) Dublin	4
(Italy) Bocconi	7

== Ninth-position group ==
Pos	Team	Pld	W	D	L	GF	GA	GD	Pts	ZUR	BRU	BEL	VAL
1	(Switzerland) Zürich Lions	3	3	0	0	26	6	+20	9	—	7–2	7–3	—
2	(Belgium) Brussels Beavers	3	2	0	1	14	8	+6	6	—	—	5–1	—
3	Belgium Mixed	3	1	0	2	13	12	+1	3	—	—	—	—
4	(France) Valenciennes	3	0	0	3	1	28	−27	0	1–12	0–7	0–9	—

Source: Pointbench.com
