= Ken Galluccio Cup =

European field lacrosse competition

- Sport: Lacrosse
- Founded: 2008
- No. of teams: 7 (in 2026)
- Continent: Europe
- Most recent champion: (England) Mellor
- Most titles: (England) Stockport (4 titles)
- 2026 Ken Galluccio Cup

The Ken Galluccio Cup is the European field lacrosse championship club competition. Organised by the European Lacrosse Federation, it is contested by the men's and women's champions from European lacrosse leagues.

== History ==
The idea of the competition was conceived by Kenneth Galluccio, one of the first ambassadors of lacrosse in Germany. The first edition, played in 2008 in Hamburg, Germany, was contested by five clubs. English team Wilmslow Lacrosse Club claimed the title.

After the death of Galluccio in February 2009 the tournament was suspended for a year. The tournament returned in 2010 renaming the championship in his honour. In this edition, Stockport defeated Wilmslow in the all-English final.

From 2013 to 2021, it was played in Ghent, Belgium. From 2022 to 2024, it was played in Barcelona, Spain. From 2025 to 2027 it will be played in Radotín, Czech Republic

== Men's Finals ==
Season	Host	Champion	Runner-up	Score
2008	(Germany) Hamburg	(England) Wilmslow	(Czech Republic) Jižní Město	
2010	(England) Manchester	(England) Stockport	(England) Wilmslow	7–4
2011	(Germany) Hamburg	(Sweden) Farsta	(England) Blues	7–3
2012	(Czech Republic) Prague	(Czech Republic) Malešice	(Netherlands) Delft Barons	9–8
2013	(Belgium) Ghent	(England) Spencer	(Sweden) Farsta	13–3
2014	(Belgium) Ghent	(England) Stockport	(Switzerland) Zürich Lions	9–4
2015	(Belgium) Ghent	(England) Stockport	(Sweden) Farsta	9–2
2016	(Belgium) Ghent	(England) Stockport	(Norway) Oslo Lacrosse	12–5
2017	(Belgium) Ghent	(Finland) Turku Titans	(Norway) Oslo Lacrosse	8–6
2018	(Belgium) Ghent	(England) Poynton	(Germany) Rot-Weiß München	15–5
2019	(Belgium) Ghent	(England) Hampstead	(Norway) Oslo Lacrosse	8–2
2020	(Belgium) Ghent	Cancelled due to the COVID-19 pandemic		
2021	(Belgium) Ghent	Cancelled due to the COVID-19 pandemic		
2022	(Spain) Barcelona	(England) Spencer	(Germany) Frankfurt	9–4
2023	(Spain) Barcelona	(Norway) Saints Lacrosse	(Germany) HTHC Hamburg	13–3
2024	(Spain) Barcelona	(England) Hampstead	(Germany) HTHC Hamburg	15–8
2025	(Czech Republic) Radotín	(England) Spencer	(Norway) Oslo Saints	7–3
2026	(Czech Republic) Radotín	(England) Mellor	(Czech Republic) LCC Wolves	7–4

== Men's Performances ==
=== By club ===
Team	Titles	Runners-up
(England) Stockport	4 (2010, 2014, 2015, 2016)	1 (2011)
(England) Spencer	3 (2013, 2022, 2025)	—
(England) Hampstead	2 (2019, 2024)	
(Sweden) Farsta	1 (2011)	2 (2013, 2015)
(England) Wilmslow	1 (2008)	1 (2010)
(Norway) Oslo Saints	1 (2023)	1 (2025)
(Czech Republic) Malešice	1 (2012)	—
(Finland) Turku Titans	1 (2017)	—
(England) Poynton	1 (2018)	—
(England) Mellor	1 (2026)	—
(Norway) Oslo Lacrosse	—	3 (2016, 2017, 2019)
(Germany) HTHC Hamburg	—	2 (2023, 2024)
(Czech Republic) Jižní Město	—	1 (2008)
(Netherlands) Delft Barons	—	1 (2012)
(Switzerland) Zürich Lions	—	1 (2013)
(Germany) Rot-Weiß München	—	1 (2018)
(Germany) Frankfurt	—	1 (2022)
(Czech Republic) LCC Wolves	—	1 (2026)

=== Men's results by country ===
Team	Titles	Runners-up
England	12	2
Norway	1	4
Czech Republic	1	2
Sweden	1	2
Finland	1	0
Germany	—	4
Netherlands	—	1

== Men's performance review ==
This table shows the comparison of the performances of all of the clubs that participated in the Ken Galluccio Cup.

=== Classification ===
C	Champion
RU	Runner-up
3rd	Third qualified
4th	Fourth qualified
	5th to 8th

=== Performance ===
Clubs (# of participations)	2015	2016	2017	2018	2019	2022	2023	2024	2025	2026
(Austria) AUSTRIA (4)
Vienna Monarchs (4)	6th		10th	8th		7th				
(Belgium) BELGIUM (8)
Belgium Mixed (1)	12th									
Braine Lions (3)			11th	9th	7th					
Brussels Beavers (2)	10th					9th				
Ghent Goblins (3)		11th					8th			
(Croatia) CROATIA (1)
LK Split Legion (1)						10th				
(Czech Republic) CZECH REPUBLIC (7)
Jižní Město (4)			5th	4th		4th			4th	
LCC Wolves (1)										RU
Radotín (2)		9th			4th					
(England) ENGLAND (11)
Cheadle (1)			3rd							
Hampstead (3)					C		3rd	C		
Mellor (1)										C
Poynton (1)				C						
Spencer (3)						C			C	
Stockport (2)	C	C								
(Finland) FINLAND (2)
Turku Titans (2)		4th	C							
(France) FRANCE (1)
Valenciennes (1)	11th									
(Germany) GERMANY (10)
HTHC Hamburg (5)		3rd			3rd		RU	RU	3rd	
Frankfurt (2)						RU				3rd
Rot-Weiß München (1)				RU						
Schwarz-Weiß Köln (1)			4th							
Stuttgart (1)	5th									
(Republic of Ireland) IRELAND (4)
Dublin (2)	8th	10th								
UCD (2)				10th	8th					
(Italy) ITALY (7)
Bocconi (4)	7th	7th	8th							6th
Bologna Sharks (2)							9th		10th	
Milano Painkillers (1)								6th		
(Netherlands) NETHERLANDS (10)
Amsterdam Lions (6)	4th	8th	9th		5th	11th		7th		
Domstad Devils (1)				7th						
Delft Barons (2)							5th		8th	
Rotterdam Jaguars (1)										5th
(Norway) NORWAY (10)
Oslo Lacrosse (5)	3rd	RU	RU	3rd	RU					
Oslo Saints (5)						3rd	C	4th	RU	4th
(Poland) POLAND (3)
Kosynierzy Wrocław (2)		12th	12th							
Panthers Wrocław (1)									6th	
(Spain) SPAIN (4)
Madrid Osos (3)						8th	6th	5th		
Barcelona Dracs (1)									7th	
(Sweden) SWEDEN (8)
Farsta (2)	RU			5th						
Nordia (2)		6th			6th					
Sundbyberg (4)			6th			6th	4th		9th	
(Switzerland) SWITZERLAND (9)
Zürich Lions (6)	9th	5th	7th	5th					5th	7th
Olten Saints (3)						5th	7th	3rd		
