= 2017 Ken Galluccio Cup =

Tournament details
- City: (Belgium) Ghent
- Dates: 16–17 September 2017
- Teams: 12

Final positions
- Champions: (Finland) Turku Titans (1st title)
- Runners-up: (Norway) Oslo

The 2017 Ken Galluccio Cup was the ninth edition of the Ken Galluccio Cup, the European men's lacrosse club competition.

Turku Titans was the first Finnish team ever to win the title.

== Competition format ==
The twelve teams were divided into four groups of three, where the two first qualified teams joined the quarterfinals.

== Group stage ==
=== Group A ===
Pos	Team	Pld	W	D	L	GF	GA	GD	Pts	Qualification	CHE	SUN	BRA
1	(England) Cheadle	2	2	0	0	23	6	+17	6	Qualification to quarterfinals	—	10–4	13–2
2	(Sweden) Sundbyberg	2	1	0	1	15	11	+4	3	Qualification to quarterfinals	—	—	11–1
3	(Belgium) Braine Lions	2	0	0	2	3	24	−21	0	Qualification to ninth position group	—	—	—

Source: Pointbench.com

=== Group B ===
Pos	Team	Pld	W	D	L	GF	GA	GD	Pts	Qualification	OSL	BOC	KOS
1	(Norway) Oslo	2	2	0	0	23	1	+22	6	Qualification to quarterfinals	—	9–1	14–0
2	(Italy) Bocconi	2	1	0	1	8	11	−3	3	Qualification to quarterfinals	—	—	7–2
3	(Poland) Kosynierzy Wrocław	2	0	0	2	2	21	−19	0	Qualification to ninth position group	—	—	—

Source: Pointbench.com

=== Group C ===
Pos	Team	Pld	W	D	L	GF	GA	GD	Pts	Qualification	KOL	JIZ	AMS
1	(Germany) Schwarz-Weiß Köln	2	2	0	0	9	6	+3	6	Qualification to quarterfinals	—	5–3	4–3
2	(Czech Republic) Jižní Město	2	1	0	1	11	8	+3	3	Qualification to quarterfinals	—	—	—
3	(Netherlands) Amsterdam Lions	2	0	0	2	6	12	−6	0	Qualification to ninth position group	—	3–8	—

Source: Pointbench.com

=== Group D ===
Pos	Team	Pld	W	D	L	GF	GA	GD	Pts	Qualification	TUR	ZUR	VIE
1	(Finland) Turku Titans	2	2	0	0	18	4	+14	6	Qualification to quarterfinals	—	9–1	9–3
2	(Switzerland) Zürich Lions	2	1	0	1	3	10	−7	3	Qualification to quarterfinals	—	—	2–1
3	(Austria) Vienna Monarchs	2	0	0	2	4	11	−7	0	Qualification to ninth position group	—	—	—

Source: Pointbench.com

== Championship bracket ==
Quarter-finals
(Finland) Turku Titans	12
(Italy) Bocconi	1
(England) Cheadle	9
(Czech Republic) Jižní Město	3
(Norway) Oslo	9
(Switzerland) Zürich	4
(Germany) Schwarz-Weiß Köln	5
(Sweden) Sundbyberg	4

Semi-finals
(Finland) Turku Titans	4
(England) Cheadle	3
(Norway) Oslo	5
(Germany) Schwarz-Weiß Köln	3

Final
(Finland) Turku Titans	8
(Norway) Oslo	6
Third place
(England) Cheadle (a.e.t.)	4
(Germany) Schwarz-Weiß Köln	3

== Fifth-position bracket ==
Semi-finals
(Italy) Bocconi	2
(Czech Republic) Jižní Město	10
(Switzerland) Zürich Lions	5
(Sweden) Sundbyberg	6

Fifth position
(Czech Republic) Jižní Město	6
(Sweden) Sundbyberg	4
Seventh position
(Italy) Bocconi	1
(Switzerland) Zürich Lions	6

== Ninth-position group ==
Pos	Team	Pld	W	D	L	GF	GA	GD	Pts	AMS	VIE	BRA	KOS
1	(Netherlands) Amsterdam Lions	3	3	0	0	20	3	+17	9	—	6–3	—	6–0
2	(Austria) Vienna Monarchs	3	2	0	1	21	12	+9	6	—	—	—	—
3	(Belgium) Braine Lions	3	1	0	2	9	18	−9	3	0–8	3–9	—	6–1
4	(Poland) Kosynierzy Wrocław	3	0	0	3	4	21	−17	0	—	3–9	—	—

Source: Pointbench.com
