= 2016 Ken Galluccio Cup =

Tournament details
- City: (Belgium) Ghent
- Dates: 10–11 September 2016
- Teams: 12

Final positions
- Champions: (England) Stockport (4th title)
- Runners-up: (Norway) Oslo

The 2016 Ken Galluccio Cup was the eighth edition of the Ken Galluccio Cup, the European men's lacrosse club competition.

Stockport won its fourth title, the third consecutive one.

== Competition format ==
The twelve teams were divided into four groups of three, where the two first qualified teams joined the quarterfinals.

== Group stage ==
=== Group A ===
Pos	Team	Pld	W	D	L	GF	GA	GD	Pts	Qualification	STO	ZUR	GHE
1	(England) Stockport	2	2	0	0	18	0	+18	6	Qualification to quarterfinals	—	3–0	15–0
2	(Switzerland) Zürich Lions	2	1	0	1	8	4	+4	3	Qualification to quarterfinals	—	—	8–1
3	(Belgium) Ghent Goblins	2	0	0	2	1	23	−22	0	Qualification to ninth position group	—	—	—

Source: Pointbench.com

=== Group B ===
Pos	Team	Pld	W	D	L	GF	GA	GD	Pts	Qualification	TUR	NOR	DUB
1	(Finland) Turku Titans	2	2	0	0	17	4	+13	6	Qualification to quarterfinals	—	—	—
2	(Sweden) Nordia	2	1	0	1	9	12	−3	3	Qualification to quarterfinals	1–8	—	8–4
3	(Republic of Ireland) Dublin	2	0	0	2	7	17	−10	0	Qualification to ninth position group	3–9	—	—

Source: Pointbench.com

=== Group C ===
Pos	Team	Pld	W	D	L	GF	GA	GD	Pts	Qualification	OSL	BOC	RAD
1	(Norway) Oslo	2	2	0	0	17	5	+12	6	Qualification to quarterfinals	—	8–0	9–5
2	(Italy) Bocconi	2	1	0	1	6	12	−6	3	Qualification to quarterfinals	—	—	—
3	(Czech Republic) Radotín	2	0	0	2	9	15	−6	0	Qualification to ninth position group	—	4–6	—

Source: Pointbench.com

=== Group D ===
Pos	Team	Pld	W	D	L	GF	GA	GD	Pts	Qualification	HAM	AMS	KOS
1	(Germany) Hamburg	2	2	0	0	23	3	+20	6	Qualification to quarterfinals	—	—	11–2
2	(Netherlands) Amsterdam Lions	2	1	0	1	9	13	−4	3	Qualification to quarterfinals	1–12	—	8–1
3	(Poland) Kosynierzy Wrocław	2	0	0	2	3	19	−16	0	Qualification to ninth position group	—	—	—

Source: Pointbench.com

== Championship bracket ==
Quarter-finals
(England) Stockport	13
(Italy) Bocconi	4
(Germany) Hamburg	11
(Sweden) Nordia	5
(Finland) Turku Titans	10
(Netherlands) Amsterdam Lions	1
(Norway) Oslo	8
(Switzerland) Zürich	2

Semi-finals
(England) Stockport	8
(Germany) Hamburg	5
(Finland) Turku Titans	3
(Norway) Oslo	5

Final
(England) Stockport	12
(Norway) Oslo	5
Third place
(Germany) Hamburg (a.e.t.)	7
(Finland) Turku Titans	6

== Fifth-position bracket ==
Semi-finals
(Italy) Bocconi	4
(Sweden) Nordia	6
(Netherlands) Amsterdam Lions	4
(Switzerland) Zürich Lions	6

Fifth position
(Sweden) Nordia	2
(Switzerland) Zürich Lions	4
Seventh position
(Italy) Bocconi	6
(Netherlands) Amsterdam Lions	4

== Ninth-position group ==
Pos	Team	Pld	W	D	L	GF	GA	GD	Pts	RAD	DUB	GHE	KOS
1	(Czech Republic) Radotín	3	3	0	0	36	6	+30	9	—	—	—	—
2	(Republic of Ireland) Dublin	3	2	0	1	14	19	−5	6	2–14	—	—	6–5
3	(Belgium) Ghent Goblins	3	1	0	2	7	21	−14	3	3–12	0–6	—	4–3
4	(Poland) Kosynierzy Wrocław	3	0	0	3	9	20	−11	0	1–10	—	—	—

Source: Pointbench.com
