= All England =

All England may refer to:

- An archaic term for the former Kingdom of England
  - Primate of All England derives from this, and remains an office in the Church of England
- All England Open Badminton Championships, one of the world's oldest badminton tournaments, started in the 1890s
- England Championship, a wrestling title
- All England Cup, a greyhound racing competition held at Brough Park
- All England Eleven, a term used for various non-international English cricket teams
- All England Jumping Course at Hickstead, an equestrian sport (especially showjumping) venue
- All England Law Reports, a long-running series of law reports covering cases from the court system in England and Wales
- All England Lawn Tennis and Croquet Club, best known for the Wimbledon tennis championship
- England Theatre Festival, a country-wide English theatre festival
- All England Women's Lacrosse Association, one of the (now-merged) governing bodies for lacrosse in England
