= Cheadle Lacrosse Club =

- Founded: 1879
- Location: Stockport Cheadle, Greater Manchester
- Colors

Cheadle Lacrosse Club is a lacrosse club based in Cheadle, Greater Manchester, a suburb of Stockport. The club was established in 1879. Cheadle currently field four men's lacrosse teams as well as running respective junior teams.

== See also ==
- Lacrosse in England
- English Lacrosse Association
- Senior Flags
- List of the oldest lacrosse teams
