= Ben McAllister =

English lacrosse player

- Born: Stockport, ENG
- Nationality: English
- Height: 5 ft 10 in (1.78 m)
- Weight: 220 pounds (100 kg)
- Shoots: Right
- Position: Goalie
- team: Stockport Lacrosse Club

Ben McAllister (born in Stockport, Greater Manchester) is an English lacrosse player. He was a goalie for both Stockport Lacrosse Club and for the England men's national lacrosse team.

== Awards ==
Preceded by Unknown	NEMLA Most Valuable Players; 2010	Succeeded by Unknown
