= Audrey Beeton =

English lacrosse player (1889–1981)

Edith Audrey Mayson Beeton (married name Levick, 1889–1981) was an English lacrosse player who proposed the establishment of the Ladies' Lacrosse Association.

== Early life ==
She was born 30 July 1890 to newspaper correspondent Mayson Moss Beeton, who became president of the Anglo-Newfoundland Development Company. Her paternal grandmother was Isabella Beeton, author of Mrs Beeton's Book of Household Management. She attended Roedean School, one of the first schools to have a lacrosse team. She played as a shooter.

In 1909, Beeton served as captain of the Southern Ladies' lacrosse team, which played against school teams as no other club teams existed yet.

== Ladies' Lacrosse Association ==
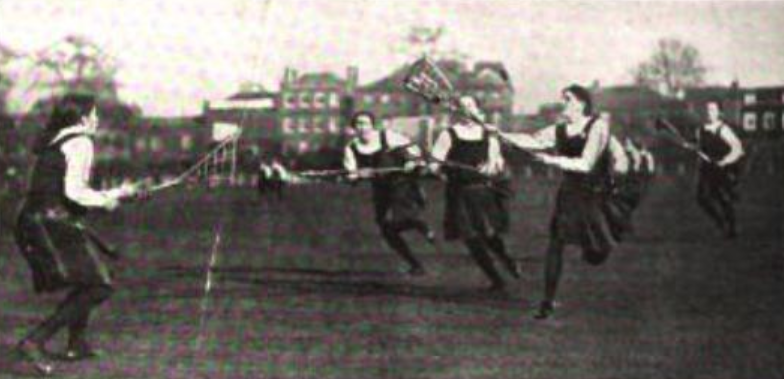
A match between the English International lacrosse team and Roedean School and Others in 1914

In January 1912, Beeton proposed that an association be formed to standardise rules across women's school and club teams. In April that year, the Ladies' Lacrosse Association was formed with her former headmistress Penelope Lawrence as president, Margaret Stansfeld as vice-president, Irene Cohen as Honorary Treasurer and Beeton as Honorary Secretary. The club issued rules and procedures for lacrosse matches in 1913 and staged the first international match—England vs Wales and Scotland—that year. The LLA had 100 member clubs by 1914. Its name changed to the All England Ladies' Association in 1925 and the All England Women's Lacrosse Association in 1965. In 1996, it merged with the English Lacrosse Union to form the English Lacrosse Association.

== War service and later life ==
During World War I, Beeton and her sister Marjorie served as Voluntary Aid Detachment nurses. In 1915, she worked at St George's Hill Military Hospital in Weybridge and took a course in massage therapy for disabled soldiers.

On 16 November 1918, she married Murray Levick, a naval surgeon who had belonged to the surviving Northern Party of Scott's expedition to the Arctic. After his death in 1979, she lived in Budleigh Salterton with their son, Rodney, and a collection of stuffed penguins.
