= 2018 Ken Galluccio Cup =

Tournament details
- City: (Belgium) Ghent
- Dates: 14–16 September 2018
- Teams: 10

Final positions
- Champions: (England) Poynton (1st title)
- Runners-up: (Germany) Rot-Weiß München

The 2018 Ken Galluccio Cup was the 10th edition of the Ken Galluccio Cup, the European men's lacrosse club competition.

Poynton achieved their first title ever.

== Competition format ==
The ten teams were divided into two groups of five, where the two first qualified teams joined the semifinals.

== Group stage ==
=== Group A ===
Pos	Team	Pld	W	D	L	GF	GA	GD	Pts	Qualification	OSL	JIZ	FAR	DOM	BRA
1	(Norway) Oslo	4	3	1	0	38	12	+26	10	Qualification to semifinals	—	5–5	8–2	8–4	17–1
2	(Czech Republic) Jižní Město	4	3	1	0	24	13	+11	10	Qualification to semifinals		—	6–4	5–4	8–0
3	(Sweden) Farsta	4	2	0	2	14	17	−3	6	Qualification to fifth position bracket			—	3–2	
4	(Netherlands) Domstad Devils	4	1	0	3	19	17	+2	3	Qualification to fifth position bracket				—	
5	(Belgium) Braine Lions	4	0	0	4	3	39	−36	0	Qualification to ninth position game			1–5	1–9	—

Source: Pointbench.com

=== Group B ===
Pos	Team	Pld	W	D	L	GF	GA	GD	Pts	Qualification	POY	MUN	ZUR	VIE	UCD
1	(England) Poynton	4	4	0	0	43	9	+34	12	Qualification to semifinals	—	10–1	8–3	10–3	15–2
2	(Germany) Rot-Weiß München	4	3	0	1	29	15	+14	9	Qualification to semifinals		—	8–2	6–1	14–2
3	(Switzerland) Zürich Lions	4	2	0	2	20	16	+4	6	Qualification to fifth position bracket			—		
4	(Austria) Vienna Monarchs	4	1	0	3	7	24	−17	3	Qualification to fifth position bracket			0–7	—	
5	(Republic of Ireland) UCD	4	0	0	4	5	40	−35	0	Qualification to ninth position game			0–8	1–3	—

Source: Pointbench.com

== Championship bracket ==
Semi-finals
(Norway) Oslo	3
(Germany) Rot-Weiß München	5
(England) Poynton	7
(Czech Republic) Jižní Město	1

Final
(Germany) Rot-Weiß München	5
(England) Poynton	15
Third place
(Norway) Oslo	3
(Czech Republic) Jižní Město	2

== Fifth-position bracket ==
Semi-finals
(Sweden) Farsta	4
(Austria) Vienna Monarchs	2
(Switzerland) Zürich Lions	4
(Netherlands) Domstad Devils	0

Fifth position
(Sweden) Farsta	2
(Switzerland) Zürich Lions	7
Seventh position
(Austria) Vienna Monarchs	2
(Netherlands) Domstad Devils	10

== Ninth-position game ==
Final
(Belgium) Braine Lions	4
(Republic of Ireland) UCD	3
