= La Spezia Black Eagles =

The La Spezia Black Eagles (Italian: La Spezia Aquile Nere) are a lacrosse team based in La Spezia, Italy. They are one of the first teams from Italy, along with the Rome Lions. The president and coach of the team is Roberto Pallotti.
