= 2019 Ken Galluccio Cup =

Tournament details
- City: (Belgium) Ghent
- Dates: 6–8 September 2019
- Teams: 8

Final positions
- Champions: (England) Hampstead (1st title)
- Runners-up: (Norway) Oslo
- Third place: (Germany) Hamburg
- Fourth place: (Czech Republic) Radotín

The 2019 Ken Galluccio Cup was the 11th edition of the Ken Galluccio Cup, the European men's lacrosse club competition.

== Competition format ==
The eight teams were divided into two groups of four, where the two first qualified teams joined the semifinals. Groups were drawn on 10 August 2019.

== Group stage ==
=== Group A ===
Pos	Team	Pld	W	D	L	GF	GA	GD	Pts	Qualification	HAM	OSL	AMS	BRA
1	(England) Hampstead	3	3	0	0	32	11	+21	9	Qualification to semifinals	—	6–5	11–2	15–4
2	(Norway) Oslo	3	2	0	1	22	8	+14	6	Qualification to semifinals	—	—	4–0	13–2
3	(Netherlands) Amsterdam Lions	3	1	0	2	11	18	−7	3	Qualification to fifth position bracket	—	—	—	9–3
4	(Belgium) Braine Lions	3	0	0	3	9	37	−28	0	Qualification to fifth position bracket	—	—	—	—

Source: Ken Galluccio Cup

=== Group B ===
Pos	Team	Pld	W	D	L	GF	GA	GD	Pts	Qualification	HAM	RAD	NOR	UCD
1	(Germany) Hamburg	3	3	0	0	40	10	+30	9	Qualification to semifinals	—	11–7	11–2	18–1
2	(Czech Republic) Radotín	3	2	0	1	36	15	+21	6	Qualification to semifinals	—	—	13–2	16–2
3	(Sweden) Nordia	3	1	0	2	14	26	−12	3	Qualification to fifth position bracket	—	—	—	10–2
4	(Republic of Ireland) UCD	3	0	0	3	5	44	−39	0	Qualification to fifth position bracket	—	—	—	—

Source: Ken Galluccio Cup

== Championship bracket ==
Semi-finals
(England) Hampstead	13
(Czech Republic) Radotín	0
(Germany) Hamburg	5
(Norway) Oslo	6

Final
(England) Hampstead	8
(Norway) Oslo	2
Third place
(Czech Republic) Radotín	5
(Germany) Hamburg	6

== Fifth-position bracket ==
Semi-finals
(Netherlands) Amsterdam Lions	14
(Republic of Ireland) UCD	2
(Sweden) Nordia	9
(Belgium) Braine	5

Fifth position
(Netherlands) Amsterdam Lions	6
(Sweden) Nordia	2
Seventh position
(Republic of Ireland) UCD	3
(Belgium) Braine	14
