= Senior Flags =

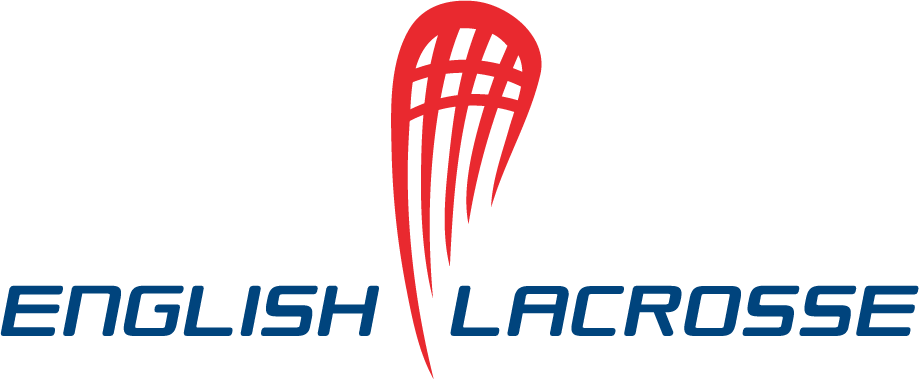
- Founded: 1883
- Region: North of England
- Current champions: Timperley Lacrosse Club (1st title)
- Most championships: Stockport Lacrosse Club (25 titles)

The North of England Men's Lacrosse Association Senior Flags, known as the Senior Flags, is an annual knockout club cup competition played for by teams in the North of England Men's Premiership. It is the oldest lacrosse club competition in the world. The Senior Flags is organised by the North of England Men's Lacrosse Association, a committee of the English Lacrosse Association.

== Past Winners 1883-1945 ==
Year	Winner	Runner-up	Score
1883–1884	South Manchester	Heaton Mersey	8–5
1884–1885	Liverpool	Heaton Mersey	9–3
1885–1886	South Manchester	Liverpool	5–3
1886–1887	Owens College	Liverpool	3–2
1887–1888	Owens College	South Manchester	6–5
1888–1889	South Manchester	Owens College	3–1
1889–1890	South Manchester	Heaton Mersey	15–5
1890–1891	South Manchester	Owens College	4–1
1891–1892	South Manchester	Owens College	6–2
1892–1893	Cheetham	South Manchester	6–2
1893–1894	Cheetham	Owens College	4–3
1894–1895	South Manchester	Owens College	10–3
1895–1896	Stockport	South Manchester	9–5
1896–1897	Stockport	Albert Park	2–1
1897–1898	Stockport	South Manchester	9–3
1898–1899	Stockport	Heaton Mersey	16–2
1899–1900	Stockport	Albert Park	12–0
1900–1901	Stockport	Heaton Mersey	11–3
1901–1902	Stockport	South Manchester	6–1
1902–1903	Stockport	South Manchester	12–5
1903–1904	South Manchester	Heaton Mersey	9–4
1904–1905	Stockport	Heaton Mersey	9–4
1905–1906	South Manchester	Stockport	3–2
1906–1907	Old Hulmeians	South Manchester	10–7
1907–1908	Old Hulmeians	South Manchester	10–7
1908–1909	South Manchester	Eccles	11–4
1909–1910	Old Hulmeians	South Manchester	10–4
1910–1911	Stockport	Old Hulmeians	6–1
1911–1912	Stockport	Albert Park	7–3
1912–1913	Stockport	Albert Park	11–2
1913–1914	Old Hulmeians	Heaton Mersey	10–6
1915–1918	No Contest	No Contest
1919–1920	South Manchester	Albert Park	6–5
1920–1921	Boardman	South Manchester	12–4
1921–1922	Boardman	Old Hulmeians	11–5
1922–1923	Old Hulmeians	Stockport	6–4
1923–1924	South Manchester	Stockport	7–4
1924–1925	Albert Park	Stockport	8–3
1925–1926	Stockport	Heaton Mersey Guild	15–5
1926–1927	Heaton Mersey	Old Mancunians	12–6
1927–1928	Stockport	Heaton Mersey Guild	16–1
1928–1929	Boardman	Eccles	9–1
1929–1930	Old Mancunians	Stockport	4–3
1930–1931	Stockport	Old Mancunians	5–4
1931–1932	Old Hulmeians	Heaton Mersey	7–3
1932–1933	South Manchester & Wythenshawe	Stockport	10–3
1933–1934	Stockport	Old Mancunians	7–6
1934–1935	Mellor	Old Mancunians	9–4
1935–1936	Mellor	Old Hulmeians	13–5
1936–1937	Mellor	Old Waconians	9–5
1937–1938	Old Waconians	Old Hulmeians	8–6
1938–1939	Old Waconians	Boardman & Eccles	7–2
1940–1945	No Contest	No Contest

== Past Winners 1946-Present ==
Year	Winner	Runner-up	Score
1946–1947	Old Waconians	Old Hulmeians	9–2
1947–1948	Mellor	Boardman & Eccles	5–4
1948–1949	Old Hulmeians	Ashton	10–7
1949–1950	Old Hulmeians	Mellor	9–7
1950–1951	Old Waconians	Old Mancunians	9–8
1951–1952	Old Waconians	Old Mancunians	7–4
1952–1953	Old Waconians	Old Hulmeians	8–4
1953–1954	Heaton Mersey	Old Hulmeians	8–7
1954–1955	Old Waconians	Old Hulmeians	10–5
1955–1956	Old Hulmeians	Old Mancunians	8–5
1956–1957	Old Mancunians	Heaton Mersey	9–7
1957–1958	Heaton Mersey	Old Mancunians	5–4
1958–1959	Heaton Mersey	Old Hulmeians	4–1
1959–1960	Heaton Mersey	Manchester University	8–6
1960–1961	Boardman & Eccles	Manchester University	8–6
1961–1962	Old Hulmeians	South Manchester & Wythenshawe	6–1
1962–1963	Mellor	Heaton Mersey	15–7
1963–1964	Old Hulmeians	Heaton Mersey	10–3
1964–1965	Mellor	Old Hulmeians	7–5
1965–1966	South Manchester & Wythenshawe	Old Hulmeians	11–5
1966–1967	Mellor	South Manchester & Wythenshawe	12–11
1967–1968	Old Hulmeians	Mellor	6–5
1968–1969	Mellor	Cheadle	19–4
1969–1970	South Manchester & Wythenshawe	Mellor	9–5
1970–1971	South Manchester & Wythenshawe	Urmston	18–5
1971–1972	South Manchester & Wythenshawe	Urmston	7–5
1972–1973	South Manchester & Wythenshawe	Mellor	11–2
1973–1974	Urmston	Sheffield University	12–5
1974–1975	Urmston	Sheffield University	14–7
1975–1976	Old Hulmeians	South Manchester & Wythenshawe	12–8
1976–1977	Sheffield University	Urmston	17–11
1977–1978	Cheadle	South Manchester & Wythenshawe	10–4
1978–1979	Cheadle	Mellor	15–11
1979–1980	South Manchester & Wythenshawe	Old Hulmeians	14–10
1980–1981	Cheadle	Mellor	13–7
1981–1982	Sheffield University	Cheadle	13–11
1982–1983	Sheffield University	Cheadle	15–10
1983–1984	Cheadle	South Manchester & Wythenshawe	15–8
1984–1985	Cheadle	Old Hulmeians	12–5
1985–1986	Heaton Mersey	Stockport	10–8
1986–1987	Stockport	Mellor	9–8
1987–1988	Mellor	Stockport	11–6
1988–1989	Stockport	Cheadle	9–8
1989–1990	Cheadle	Mellor	7–6
1990–1991	Cheadle	Stockport	10–9
1991–1992	Cheadle	Heaton Mersey	15–12
1992–1993	Heaton Mersey	Timperley	13–9
1993–1994	Cheadle	Mellor	11–8
1994–1995	Cheadle	Mellor	9–4
1995–1996	Stockport	Mellor	7–4
1996–1997	Mellor	Heaton Mersey	13–10
1997–1998	Cheadle	Heaton Mersey	8–7
1998–1999	Stockport	Heaton Mersey	13–6
1999–2000	Cheadle	Heaton Mersey	14–7
2000–2001	Cheadle	Old Waconians	9–7
2001–2002	Heaton Mersey	Stockport	14–13
2002–2003	Cheadle	Mellor	15–13
2003–2004	Stockport	Heaton Mersey	14–13
2004–2005	Stockport	Heaton Mersey	14–10
2005–2006	Heaton Mersey	Stockport	6–4
2006–2007	Manchester Waconians	Mellor	9–3
2007–2008	Wilmslow	Mellor	19–10
2008–2009	Cheadle	Stockport	9–8
2009–2010	Stockport	Rochdale	9–2
2010–2011	Cheadle	Heaton Mersey	9–8
2011–2012	Stockport	Cheadle	15–2
2012–2013	Stockport	Cheadle	8–6
2013–2014	Cheadle	Stockport	10–8
2014–2015	Cheadle	Heaton Mersey	14–8
2015–2016	Poynton	Cheadle	8–7
2016–2017	Poynton	Cheadle	14–8
2017–2018	Poynton	Cheadle	10–6
2018–2019	Poynton	Cheadle	13–11 (OT)
2019–2020	No Contest	No Contest
2020–2021	No Contest	No Contest
2021–2022	Heaton Mersey	Stockport	14–11
2022–2023	Cheadle	Brooklands	10–6
2023–2024	Stockport	Heaton Mersey	16–8
2024–2025	Poynton	Brooklands	16–13
2025–2026	Timperley	Poynton	13–11
