= Stockport Lacrosse Club =

Lacrosse club in the UK

- Founded: 1876; 150 years ago
- Location: Davenport, Stockport, England
- Colors

Stockport Lacrosse Club is a lacrosse club based in Davenport, Greater Manchester, a suburb of Stockport. The club was established in 1876 and is the oldest lacrosse club in England. Stockport currently field both men's and women's lacrosse teams as well as running respective junior programmes. The club have been based at Cale Green Pavilion in Davenport since 1883.

== History ==
=== The Beginning ===
Stockport Lacrosse Club was founded in 1876 as a result of an exhibition tour organised by the "founding father of the modern game', William George Beers. Stockport Lacrosse Club is widely regarded as one of (if not the) oldest existing lacrosse club in the world. Montreal Lacrosse Club and Mohawk Lacrosse Club were founded earlier but have folded and re-formed in that period.

=== The Great years ===
The Senior Flags victory of 1896 was the start of the first of two conquering periods. For eight consecutive seasons from 1896 to 1903, Stockport swept aside all opposition to win the Flags, a record that has not been equalled since. In the same period the Iroquois Cup and First division Championship were both won six times. The club has to thank in particular two families, the Masons and Johnsons whose family members made up between them nine out of the total of twenty who played on the team during that period. The Mason family alone accounting for six of the players. A major trophy of the period remains in the possession of the club. This is the Flags Final Challenge Flag, which was won outright in 1898. The flag is a large, finely detailed embroidered Trophy depicting two lacrosse players dressed in the kit of the period stood on each side of a shield, with the winning clubs of the previous seasons scrolled on each side. The Challenge Flag is permanently on display at the club's Headquarters.

=== Cale Green Pavilion ===
In 1883, the Mayor of Stockport, Henry Bell JP, donated the Cale Green ground to the town with financial support from the club. This ground was the home to Stockport Lacrosse Club but also to Stockport Cricket Club and Cheshire County Cricket Club. The layout of the ground has changed very little over the years, with the cricket pitch in front of the pavilion, two bowling greens and a separate pitch on a lower level which is the club's main pitch. The original pavilion is shown on the right, shows the original entrance in the middle at the front, and two windows above the door. The enclosure in front of the pavilion was for club members only, and a tiered grass banking led down to the pitch.

It was some fifty years before the next major change, which saw an extension being added to the western end of the building which in due course became the function room. There is a clear line along the roof tiles which shows the size of the extension. The extension also added a new area below ground and the changing rooms were moved below ground with the exit being next to the front door. The picture to the right shows the extension, and also the effects of some maintenance which has led to the removal of the two windows above the door and the central chimney from the roof.

=== L. R. Grainger ===
Throughout the decades, in particular since 1945 there has been a number of stalwarts of Junior Schemes who gave themselves the task of developing their own particular club's juniors and given the natural ageing process, the senior strength also.

Without the existence of this dedicated care during the 1950s and 60s many of the clubs which were able to continue after the War years could have faded through the lack of new players.

One such stalwart for the Stockport Club in 1950 was Les Grainger. Another such enthusiasts of that period was Ted Donnet for South Manchester and Wythenshawe. Les took on Stockport's juniors at the Annual General Meeting on Monday 12 September 1949 when he was appointed unanimously as Honorary Junior Secretary for the then forthcoming season 1949/50. The first junior games arranged by Les in his new role as Junior Secretary were... 22 October, Manchester Grammar School, 24 November, Ashton, 7 January, Cheadle.

There is no record of the results entered into the minute's books, however Leslie's memory provides a favourable record if not an actual result.

The position of Junior Scheme Secretary was retained by Les without a break through the '50s, '60s '70s and '80s until 1989, a total of forty continuous years. A remarkable record of achievement. Retirement was not on the agenda however, the all-encompassing position of recruitment, beginners and U12s team manager was undertaken until the early 2000s when he retired for health reasons.

Another major achievement by Leslie was the creation of the Stockport Metros, an umbrella organisation for combinations of Clubs to be able take juniors on tours with specifically the US in mind, and has succeeded in doing so on 13 occasions since 1976, the last twelve of these being part of an annual exchange with Anne Arundel County Youth Lacrosse, Maryland, USA, which still continues.

Mr. Grainger died in 2011.

== Senior Lacrosse ==
=== Men's Lacrosse ===
Stockport currently fields three senior men's teams. Its first team is among the most successful and decorated lacrosse teams in the country.

In the 2009/10 season they went undefeated and won a total of eight trophies including:

- European Club Championship
- Northern Senior Flags
- Northern Premier League
- Referees Trophy
- Iroquois Cup
- Wilkinson Sword
- Bath 8's Tournament
- Stockport Easter 8's Tournament

Stockport has produced a great number of England internationals who have represented their nation in both World & European Championships and even in the Olympics, when Lacrosse was an exhibition sport at the 1908, 1928 and 1948. Stockport have won the North of England Men's Lacrosse Association Senior Flags 25 times.

=== Women's Lacrosse ===
Stockport currently field a single senior women's team. The women's section was established in the early '90s and has grown into one of the biggest women's clubs in the north. They have players with junior and senior international honours for Wales, Scotland and England.

== Junior Lacrosse ==
The boys junior section currently run teams at U12's, U14's, U16's and U19's level. The girls junior section currently run teams at U11's, U13's, U15's, U18's level.

== International honours ==
The following Stockport players have senior representational honours in the following championships. * = Were not yet members of Stockport Lacrosse Club

- 2018 World Championships, Netanya, Israel
  - (England) Andrew Baxter
  - (England) Sam Patterson
  - (England) Joshua Sherry-Brennan
- 2016 European Championships, Budapest, Hungary
  - (England) Andrew Baxter
  - (England) Sam Patterson
  - (England) Joshua Sherry-Brennan
- 2014 World Championships, Denver, USA
  - (England) Andrew Baxter
  - (England) Ben McAllister
  - (England) Tom Gosnay
  - (England) Sam Patterson
  - (England) Tom Williamson
- 2012 European Championships, Amsterdam, NL
  - (England) Andrew Baxter
  - (England) Ben McAllister
  - (England) Tom Gosnay
  - (England) Sam Patterson
  - (England) Tom Williamson
  - (England) Joe Singleton
- 2010 World Championships, Manchester, ENG
  - (England) Andrew Baxter
  - (England) Ben McAllister
  - (England) Tom Gosnay
  - (England) Sam Patterson
  - (England) Tom Williamson
  - (England) David Cottam (Res)
- 2008 European Championships, Lahti, FIN
  - (England) Ben McAllister*
  - (England) David Cottam
  - (England) Tom Gosnay
  - (England) Sam Patterson
  - (England) Tom Williamson
  - (England) Simon McGuigan
- 2006 World Championships, London, CAN
  - (England) Ben McAllister*
  - (England) Nathan Singleton
  - (England) Tom Gosnay
  - (England) Sam Patterson
  - (England) Tom Williamson
  - (England) David Bryant
  - (England) David Cottam
- 2004 European Championships, Prague, CZ
  - (England) Ben McAllister*
  - (England) Nathan Singleton
  - (England) Chris Bland
  - (England) Paul Fullerton
  - (England) David Cottam
  - (England) David Bryant
- 2002 World Championships, Perth, AUS
  - (England) Ben McAllister*
  - (England) Nathan Singleton
  - (England) Chris Bland
  - (England) Paul Fullerton
  - (England) Steve Talbot
  - (England) David Bryant
  - (England) Neil Fildes
  - (England) Rick Wilson
- 2000 European Championships, Edinburgh, ENG
  - N/A
- 1999 European Championships, Manchester, ENG
  - (England) Rick Bone
  - (England) Matt Ashton
  - (England) Chris Bland*
  - (England) Paul Fullerton*
  - (England) Owen Jones
  - (England) Neil Fildes
  - (England) Stuart Cox
  - (England) Ben McAllister*
- 1998 World Championships, Baltimore, USA
  - (England) Chris Bland*
  - (England) Paul Fullerton*
  - (England) Steve Talbot
  - (England) Gareth Jones
  - (England) Anthony Murphy
- 1997 European Championships, Stockholm, SWE
  - N/A
- 1996 European Championships, Berlin, GER
  - N/A
- 1995 European Championships, Prague, CZE
  - N/A
- 1994 World Championships, Manchester, ENG
  - (England) Sean Ring
  - (England) Keith Gosnay
  - (England) Martin Gosnay
  - (England) Patrick Moore
- 1990 World Championships, Perth, AUS
  - (England) Patrick Moore
  - (England) Sean Ring
  - (England) Keith Gosnay
- 1986 World Championships, Toronto, CAN
  - (England) Sean Ring
  - (England) Keith Gosnay
  - (England) Malcolm Gosnay
  - (England) Andy Hiller
  - (England) Patrick Moore
- 1982 World Championships, Baltimore, USA
  - N/A
- 1978 World Championships, Stockport, ENG
  - (England) Patrick Rice
  - (England) Jeff Mounkley
  - (England) John Wolfendon
- 1974 World Championships, Melbourne, AUS
  - (England) John Wolfendon
  - (England) Frank Bedford
- 1967 World Championships, Toronto, CAN
  - (England) Mick Moore
- 1948 Olympic Games, London, GBR
  - (United Kingdom) J. Griffiths
- 1928 Olympic Games, Amsterdam, NL
  - (United Kingdom) F.E. Johnson
  - (United Kingdom) H.C. Johnson
- 1908 Olympic Games, London, GBR
  - (United Kingdom) Charles Scott
  - (United Kingdom) Gerald Mason
  - (United Kingdom) G.J. Mason
  - (United Kingdom) S.N. Haynes

=== Women's International Honours ===
- 2017 Women's World Cup, Guildford, England
  - (England) Chloe Chan
  - (Scotland) Jennifer Aiton
  - (Scotland) Chess Gray
  - (Hong Kong) Kat Barker
- 2015 Women's European Championships, Prague, Czech Republic
  - (England) Chloe Chan
  - (Scotland) Jennifer Aiton
  - (Scotland) Chess Gray

== See also ==
- Lacrosse in England
- England Lacrosse
- Senior Flags
- List of the oldest lacrosse teams
