= Rome Lions =

Italian Lacrosse team

The Rome Lions (Latin: Roma Leones) are a lacrosse team based in Rome, Italy. The Lions are the first lacrosse team in Italy, along with the La Spezia Black Eagles. They are a member of the Rome Lacrosse Club which is run by Fabio Antonelli, the former president of the Italian Lacrosse Federation.
