= Radotín (Přerov District) =

- Municipality
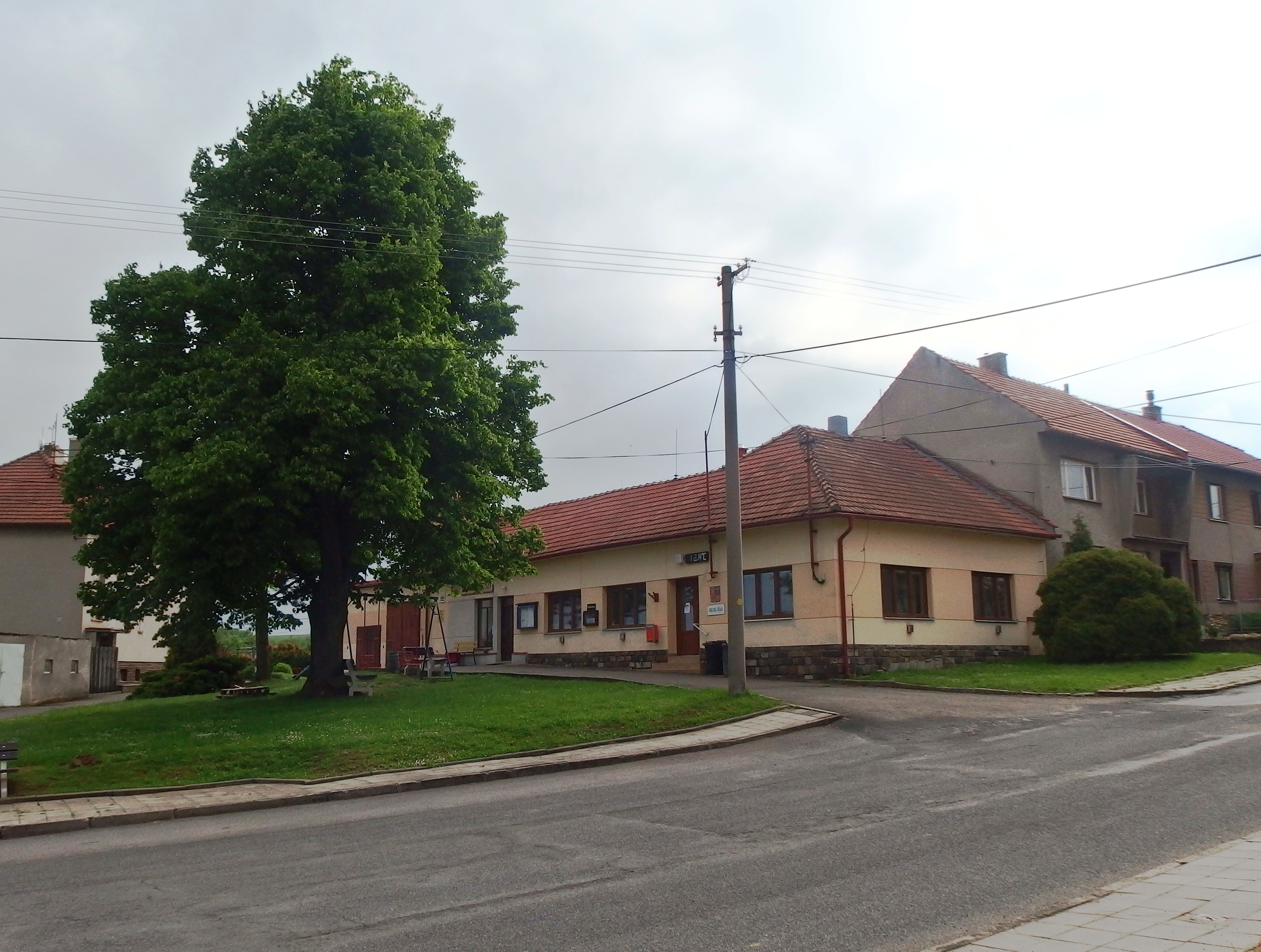
- Municipal office

- Flag Coat of arms

- Location in the Czech Republic
- Coordinates: 49°28′47″N 17°37′58″E
- Country: Czech Republic
- Region: Olomouc
- District: Přerov
- First mentioned: 1447

Area
  - Total: 2.64 km^{2} (1.02 sq mi)
- Elevation: 288 m (945 ft)

Population (2026-01-01)
  - Total: 176
  - Density: 66.7/km^{2} (173/sq mi)
- Time zone: UTC+1 (CET)
  - Summer (DST): UTC+2 (CEST)
- Postal code: 753 54
- Website: www.obecradotin.cz

Radotín is a municipality and village in Přerov District in the Olomouc Region of the Czech Republic. It has about 200 inhabitants.

Radotín lies approximately 14 kilometres (9 mi) east of Přerov, 30 km (19 mi) south-east of Olomouc, and 241 km (150 mi) east of Prague.

== Demographics ==
Historical population
Year	Pop.	±%
1869	203	—
1880	191	−5.9%
1890	221	+15.7%
1900	236	+6.8%
1910	246	+4.2%
1921	246	+0.0%
1930	242	−1.6%
1950	193	−20.2%
1961	204	+5.7%
1970	196	−3.9%
1980	176	−10.2%
1991	186	+5.7%
2001	195	+4.8%
2011	192	−1.5%
2021	171	−10.9%
Source: Censuses
