= Pellicani Bocconi Lacrosse =

- Founded: 2009
- League: Campionato Italiano Maschile FIGL
- Based in: Milan
- Stadium: CS "Forza e Corraggio"
- Head coach: David Abbott
- Manager: Roberto Antonioli
- Championships: 6
- Mascot: Gigi Pellicano
- Website: Pagina Ufficiale dei Pellicani Bocconi Lacrosse

Pellicani Bocconi Lacrosse (officially Bocconi Sport Team SSD - Sezione Lacrosse) is an Italian lacrosse team founded in Milan, Italy in 2009.

== History ==
Lacrosse was introduced in Bocconi University by a few students who had played lacrosse before in England and Hong Kong. In 2011, the team won second place at its first appearance in Coppa Italia. The arrival of American player/coach Scott Offerman helped transform the previously strictly amateur team into a more rigorous athletic organization.

== Season-by-Season ==
In 2011/12 Bocconi Lacrosse won the Italian National Championship and we arrived 2nd in Coppa Italia. Its coach won the "Coach of the Year" award and "Best Season Attackman" award.

In 2012/13, Bocconi Lacrosse won again the Italian National Championship beating Red Hawks Merate 17–3 in the final match. Bocconi Lacrosse completed the perfect season, winning all the matches. In September 2013 Bocconi Lacrosse won its first Italian National Cup beating Roma Leones 6–5 in the finale.

In 2013/14, Bocconi Lacrosse ended up first in the League without losing a single game and with goal difference +120. The team has also won the Coppa Italia 2014 in Prato.

In 2014/15, Bocconi Lacrosse ended up first in the League without losing a single game again. The team has also won the Coppa Italia 2015 in Torino. In April 2015, the team has won their only international title, the Zombies Cup in Belgrade, Serbia, having a perfect score (5-0) and beating the Poznan Hussars in the Finals.

In 2015/16, Bocconi Lacrosse ended up first in the League without losing a single game for four years straight. In September 2016, the team ended up 7th at the Ken Galluccio Cup, repeating the success of the previous year. In October 2016, the team won its fourth straight Coppa Italia, which was held in Milan, beating Red Hawks Merate in the finals 9–5.

In the 2016/17 season, for the 5th year in a row, Bocconi Lacrosse won the League without losing one single game thus qualifying again for the Ken Galluccio Cup. In September of that year the team finished 8th and finished the season winning its 5th straight Coppa Italia.

The two following seasons, after the historical core of the team retired, the Pelicans saw a massive restructuring of the team, and through the management of Matteo Scotti, Enrico Mazzullo and finally of Roberto Antonioli, managed to bring back a competitive team for the 2019/20 season.

During the 2019/20 season, the renewed ensemble started off the championship with a 4-0 stint that was only stopped by the annulment of the Championship itself due to the rise and spread of COVID-19. Also, the subsequent season was annulled by the Italian Federation.

After the 2-year break a trimmed-down team got into the 2021/22 season, and after a shaky start, managed to finish second with the mixed Roma/Merate/Torino team winning the Championship in the last match. The team bounced back in June, winning its 6th Coppa Italia.

In 2022/23, the Pelicans reached both the Championship and Coppa Italia finals, bringing home only two silver medals during what is known as the "cursed month".

== Roster 2022/2023 ==
No.		Position	Player
00	(Italy)	FOGO/LSM	Riccardo Gennari (C)
4	(Quebec)	AT	Jack Vincent (C)
5	(United States)	AT	Noah Harney
6	(Italy)	MF	Simone Ferrante
7	(Italy)	AT	Matteo Scotti
8	(Italy)	MF/FOGO	Michelangelo Brusamarello
9	(Brazil)	MF	Luca Rizzioli
10	(Italy)	DF	Fabio Del Coco
11	(Italy)	DF	Roberto Antonioli (C)
12	(Germany)	MF	Luca Keller (C)
13	(Quebec)	FOGO/MF	Alexis St-Jean
14	(Taiwan)	DF	Richard Dashiell Chang
15	(Italy)	AT	Pietro Garibbo
16	(United States)	MF	David Abbott (C)

No.		Position	Player
17	(Germany)	MF	Felix Klinkenberg
18	(Italy)	MF	Lorenzo Alessandra
19	(Italy)	DF	Giovanni Fossati
20	(United States)	DF	Carlos Panaiyotopoulos
21	(Germany)	G/MF	Marius Kraus
22	(Canada)	DF/LSM	Steven Pelliccione
23	(Slovakia)	MF	Vaclav Klein
32	(Quebec)	DF	Declan McCool
33	(Italy)	AT	Federico Galperti
42	(United Kingdom)	MF	Daniel Richards
44	(Canada)	G	David Pelliccione
45	(United States)	AT	Jonathon Gonzalez
69	(Italy)	MF	Richard Aldeghi
99	(Latvia)	MF	Georgs Lukass Rozins

== 2022/2023 In and Out ==
No.		Position	Player
	(Italy)	OUT	Enrico Mazzullo
	(Italy)	OUT	Pietro Carabellese
	(Italy)	OUT	Lorenzo Balzarini
	(Romania)	OUT	Marc Bodea
	(Italy)	OUT	Stefano Rovelli
	(Hungary)	OUT	Milan Alexy
	(Italy)	OUT	Giovanni Maria Meggiolaro
	(United States)	OUT	Filippo Bosco
	(United States)	OUT	Hunter Morris
	(United States)	OUT	Mackenzie Ballman
	(Italy)	OUT	Filippo Corso
	(Corsica)	OUT	Jean-Yves Santini
	(Switzerland)	OUT	Loris Cera
	(United States)	OUT	Rei Asami

No.		Position	Player
	(Italy)	IN	Michelangelo Brusamarello
	(Germany)	IN	Marius Kraus
	(Germany)	IN	Felix Klinkenberg
	(United States)	IN	Carlos Panaiyotopoulos
	(United States)	IN	Noah Harney
	(Slovakia)	IN	Vaclav Klein
	(Canada)	IN	Steven Pelliccione
	(Italy)	IN	Lorenzo Alessandra
	(Taiwan)	IN	Richard Dashiell Chang
	(Quebec)	IN	Declan McCool

== See also ==
- http://www.unibocconi.it/wps/wcm/connect/Bocconi/SitoPubblico_IT/Albero+di+navigazione/Home/Ateneo/Campus+Life/Attivit_/ASD+Bocconi+Sport+Team/Lacrosse/?lang=it
- Pagina Ufficiale dei Pellicani Bocconi Lacrosse
- Sito ufficiale della Federazione Italiana Giuoco Lacrosse
