= Lacrosse in England =

England Lacrosse Sport

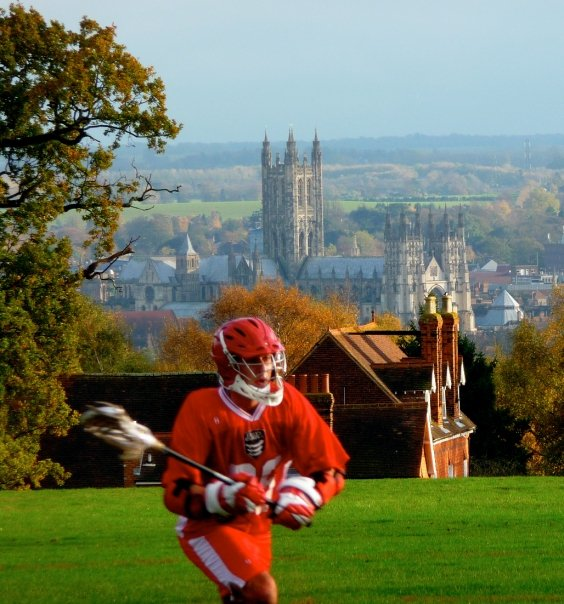
University of Essex Men's Lacrosse Player

Lacrosse in England is an amateur sport played mainly by community based clubs and university teams. Field lacrosse exhibitions were staged in England at least as early as August 1867 when a group of First Nations people played a series of games at the Crystal Palace Park Cricket Ground. William George Beers and other Canadians later toured the country playing exhibition matches in 1876. Another tour was arranged in 1883; by then England had 60 clubs playing regular fixtures in Cambridgeshire, Cheshire, Lancashire, Middlesex and Yorkshire.

The first national governing body for the men's game, the English Lacrosse Union, was formed in 1892. A Ladies' Lacrosse Association followed in 1912. The separate men's and women's organisations merged in 1996 to form the English Lacrosse Association, which was renamed England Lacrosse in 2019. England Lacrosse oversees both the men's and women's national teams.

== Men's lacrosse ==
Men's club lacrosse in England is divided into parallel northern and southern leagues generally running from late September to early April. Each league also organises its own knockout competition known as 'Flags', which culminate in their respective 'Flags Finals' at the close of each season. In addition to the regular season, English clubs host a number of internationally popular tournaments, including Bath 8s, Bluesfest, and the Nick Kehoe International.

Northern clubs are governed by the North of England Men's Lacrosse Association (NEMLA), which was formed in 1897 when 10 clubs began playing regular fixtures. NEMLA now comprises a Premiership and four further senior divisions.

The South of England Men's Lacrosse Association (SEMLA) formed on 15 March 1882 and governs clubs across southern England and Wales. As of the 2019/20 season the League consists of the Premier Division, two further senior divisions (Division 1 and Division 2), and three regional feeder divisions. For the 2018/19 season SEMLA created a new Local League to run alongside the main league to boost the number of competitive fixtures while reducing the travel commitment.

The winner of the play-off between northern and southern league champions goes forward to compete against other European league champions for the Ken Galluccio Cup in Ghent, Belgium each year. English clubs are the most successful in the tournament to date with eight out of eleven titles. Stockport are the most successful club in the tournament's history with four titles, while Hampstead, Poynton, Spencer, and Wilmslow have each won one title.

The main focus of men's lacrosse popularity in England is in Manchester and the North West. Greater Manchester has hosted the World Lacrosse Championship in 1978, 1994, and 2010. A second centre is in the South East, especially in and around London.

Men's lacrosse is a common minority sport in universities, which along with club-based youth programs, provide the majority of newcomers with their first experience of the sport. In 2008, a men's BUCS league was introduced, providing greater support and recognition to the men's university teams.

The University of Cambridge has the distinction of being the oldest university lacrosse club in the UK having formed in 1882 and have contested the Varsity Match with the University of Oxford every year since 1903, excluding during the world wars. Oxford lead the series 60-39-5.

== Women's lacrosse ==
McCrone credits lacrosse's limited popularity with Victorian men for its adoption by many girls' public schools in the 1890s. In 1905 former students from Wycombe Abbey, Roedean and Prior's Field schools formed the first women's lacrosse club in England, the Southern Ladies' Lacrosse Club. The club played against sides from public schools and was captained by Audrey Beeton, an Old Roedeanian. In 1912 Beaton led the establishment of the Ladies' Lacrosse Association, which included school teams; Beaton became honorary secretary and Penelope Lawrence, Roedean headmistress, was its first president.

The LLA expanded rapidly and established a national team in March 1913. A rivalry with field hockey developed when some girls' schools replaced hockey with lacrosse, but lacrosse remained a more minor sport.

A close relationship between the LLA and the men's English Lacrosse Union was consolidated with a merger in 1996 to form the English Lacrosse Association. Today, club women's lacrosse is governed by the South East Women's Lacrosse Association (SEWLA), South West Women's Lacrosse Association (SWWLA), and North Women's Lacrosse Association (NWLA).

== Youth ==
Lacrosse is often introduced to boys and girls with a soft stick and ball version of the game called pop lacrosse. Since 1982, the English Lacrosse Association has brought over one thousand coaches from outside the U.K. to teach young players the game.

== International ==
England, Scotland and Wales compete as separate teams in international competitions. In the men's 2006 World Lacrosse Championship England finished in 5th place and in the Women's Lacrosse World Cup in 2005, England finished 3rd. In the men's 2007 World Indoor Lacrosse Championship England finished in 4th place.

In the 2008, 2012 and 2016 European Lacrosse Championships England successfully defended their title in the Men's competition, and came second in the Women's competition.

The 2010 World Lacrosse Championships were held in Manchester, England from 16 to 24 July at the Manchester University Sports Ground, The Armitage Centre. The England team finished the tournament in 5th place.

== See also ==
- England Lacrosse
