= Mohawk Lacrosse Club =

First American lacrosse club

The Mohawk Lacrosse Club, sometimes called Mohawk Club of Troy is the first lacrosse club in the United States.

== History ==
In 1867, Indigenous Americans held an exhibition match in front of 10,000 people in Troy, New York. Following this, the Mohawk Lacrosse Club was formed in Troy in 1868 by several baseball players. As a game previously only played by Indigenous Americans, the Mohawk Lacrosse Club introduced lacrosse to people who had never seen it played through the formation of a club lacrosse program. This led to the formation of the modern game of lacrosse in the United States.

In its first season in the summer of 1868, the Mohawk Lacrosse club lost 4 games to Canadian teams, including Montreal Lacrosse Club, Crescent, Dominion and Aurora. Later, the team played a combination of college varsity and club games. In the 1974 season, the team had a 7 and 3 record, finishing 3rd in the Yankee Division of the United States Lacrosse Club Association. Over the years, the United States Lacrosse Club Association selected players from the team to participate in the annual North-South All-Star game.
