= William George Beers =

Canadian dentist and lacrosse player

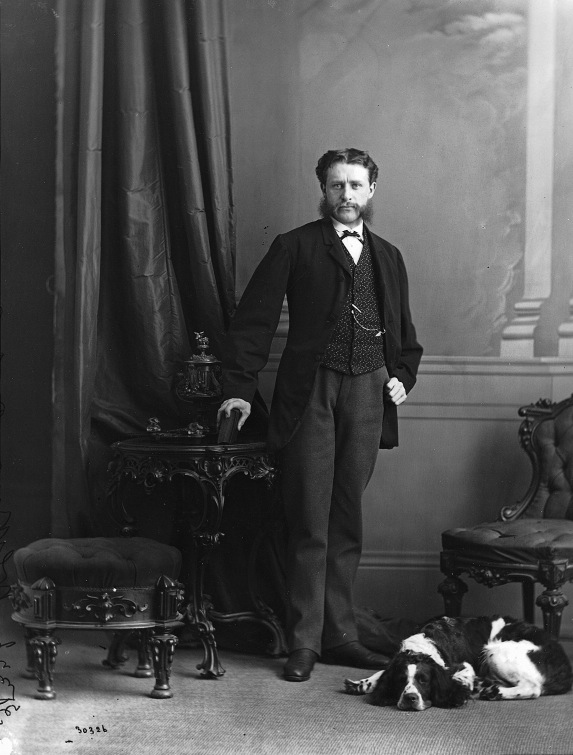
- Portrait by William Notman, 1868
- Born: May 5, 1841; Montreal, Canada East, Province of Canada
- Died: December 26, 1900 (aged 59); Montreal, Quebec, Canada
- Occupation: Dentist
- Known for: "Father of modern lacrosse"

William George Beers (May 5, 1841 – December 26, 1900) was a Canadian dentist who founded Canada's first dental journal and served as the founding dean of the Dental College of the Province of Quebec. In addition, he is referred to as the "father of modern lacrosse" for his work establishing the first set of playing rules for the game.

== Dentistry ==
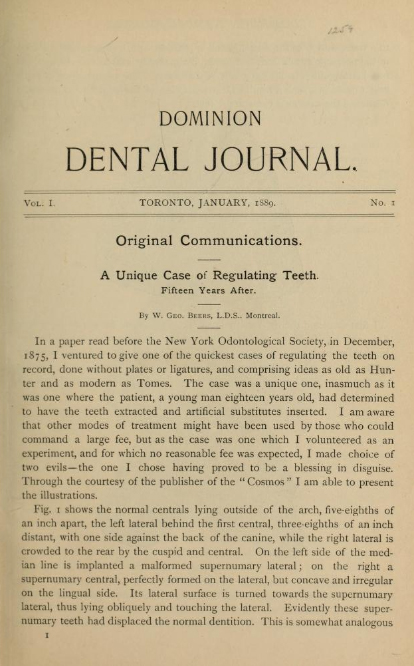
The first issue of the Dominion Dental Journal

Beers was a successful and notable dentist. After finishing his schooling in 1856, Beers completed a dental apprenticeship. By the early 1860s, Beers was a successful dentist and began publishing articles in journals. In 1868, he founded Canada's first dental journal, the Canada Journal of Dental Science. Although this publication failed, he went on to start the Dominion Dental Journal in 1889, which eventually became the modern day Journal of the Canadian Dental Association. He was instrumental in the founding of Quebec's first dental college – the Dental College of the Province of Quebec, founded in 1892 and served as its founding dean. In 1896, this College became affiliated with Bishop's University and later became the McGill University Faculty of Dentistry. He held the position of Dean at Bishop's for only a short time; differences in opinion regarding curriculum and concerns over the use of untrained dental assistants led Beers to resign from the position.

== Nationalism ==
Beers was a strong Canadian nationalist. Besides advocating for lacrosse to become the national sport of Canada believing it would serve as "unifying symbol for the emerging Canadian nationality," Beers also defended the country against the Fenian Raids in 1866 and 1870. During the raids, Beers helped establish the Victoria Rifles of Canada.

== Lacrosse ==
William Beers was involved with lacrosse from a young age. As a teenager in 1856 he was a member of the Montreal Lacrosse Club. He was selected at the age of 17 to be a goalkeeper for a Montreal exhibition team that played a match before the Prince of Wales.

In 1860, Beers began to codify the first written rules of the modern game. Prior to this, all rules of the game needed to be decided prior to each game. Some of the rules established by Beers were the size of, and the use of a rubber lacrosse ball, that the lacrosse stick could be any length, but the pocket needed to be flat in the absence of a ball, length of the field to 200 yards (180 m), size of the goal and goal crease, twelve members of a team on the field at a time, and the length of a match to first to reach five goals, or lead by three. In the process of standardizing the game, Beers removed the spiritual and ritual components present in its predecessor, the First Nations game of baggataway, and was unapologetic in its appropriation: "Just as we claim as Canadian the rivers and lakes and land once owned exclusively by Indians, so we now claim their field game as the national field game of our dominion".

In 1867, as lacrosse was growing significantly in popularity, Beers created the Canadian National Lacrosse Foundation. In 1869, Beers published a book on lacrosse entitled Lacrosse: The National Game of Canada. In 1876, Beers organized a team of Canadian players and Indians players to tour England, Scotland, and Ireland to showcase the sport. During this trip in 1876, Queen Victoria witnessed an exhibition game and was impressed, saying "The game is very pretty to watch." Her endorsement was enough for many English girls' schools to adopt the sport in the 1890s. Again in 1883, Beers returned to England to showcase lacrosse. This time Beers brought two teams to play exhibition games.

In 2023, students from the University of Leeds Men's Lacrosse Club founded The Beers Cup, created to commemorate William George Beers, which was contested by the men's lacrosse teams at the Christie Cup, an annual varsity competition between the Universities of Leeds, Manchester and Liverpool. The inaugural contest of the cup was won by the University of Leeds in 2023.

== Beers Cup ==
Beers Cup Results
Year	Leeds vs Manchester	Leeds vs Liverpool	Liverpool vs Manchester	Overall winner	City Hosted
2022/2023	N/A	N/A	N/A	Leeds	Liverpool
2023/24	2-12	2-3	1-10	Manchester	Manchester
2024/25	5-0	6-1	3-2	Leeds	Leeds
2025/26	3-3	8-1	1-4	Leeds	Liverpool

== Death ==
William George Beers died of heart disease on December 26, 1900. His estate donated his massive library of dentistry publications to the Royal College of Dental Surgeons of Ontario.

== Bibliography ==
Beers, William George (1869). Lacrosse: The National Game of Canada. Dawson Brothers (sanctioned by "National Lacrosse Association of Canada"). pp. 256. ISBN 9780665056826. "Lacrosse: The National Game of Canada."
