= Montreal Lacrosse Club =

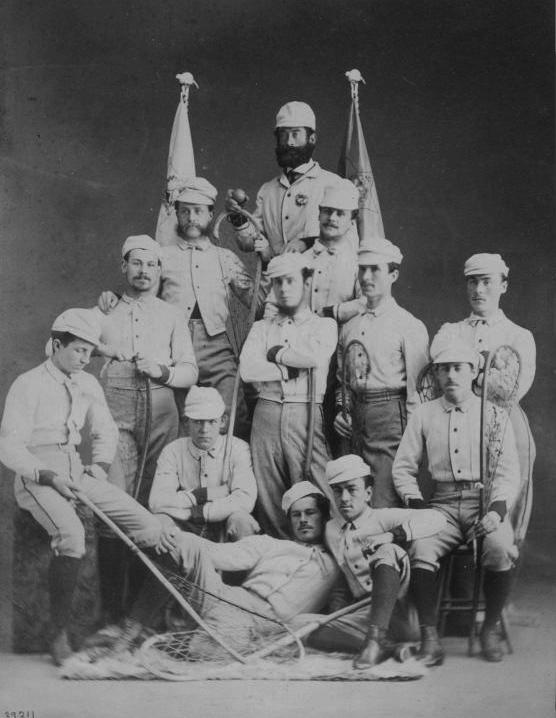
Montreal Lacrosse Club, 1867

The Montreal Lacrosse Club was a lacrosse club in Montreal, Quebec, Canada. The club is notable in the history of lacrosse as it was responsible for establishing the first set of written rules of the game.

The club was established in 1856 by the Montreal dentist, Dr. William George Beers. One of Dr. Beers' innovations, the replacement of a hair-stuffed deerskin ball with a hard rubber ball, continues to this day.

In 1860, Beers codified the game, shortening the length of each game and reducing the number of players to 12 per team. The first game played under Beers' rules was at Upper Canada College in 1867; they lost to the Toronto Cricket Club by a score of 3–1.

In 1881, the Montreal Lacrosse Club was a founding member of the Montreal Amateur Athletic Association.

A new Montreal Lacrosse Club was founded in 2006 and plays in the Quebec Senior Field Lacrosse League.
