= List of lacrosse teams in Canada =

The following is a list of notable lacrosse teams in Canada. It includes the league(s) they play for and championships won.

== National Lacrosse League ==
Current National Lacrosse League teams in Canada are:

Team	City	Established	Champion's Cup Titles (1998)	Notes
Calgary Roughnecks	Calgary, Alberta	2001	2	
Halifax Thunderbirds	Halifax, Nova Scotia	2019	4	Founded in 1995 as the Rochester Knighthawks. 5 Titles (4 in NLL) as Rochester. Relocated to Halifax in 2019
Oshawa FireWolves	Oshawa, Ontario	2025	0	
Ottawa Black Bears	Ottawa, Ontario			
Saskatchewan Rush	Saskatoon, Saskatchewan	2016	2	Founded in 1997 as the Syracuse Smash
Toronto Rock	Toronto, Ontario	1999	6	Founded in 1998 as the Ontario Raiders.
Vancouver Warriors	Vancouver, British Columbia	2013	1	Founded in 2000 as the Albany Attack. 2010 Champion's Cup winner as Washington Stealth.

Former teams

Team	City	Existed	Champion's Cup Titles (1998)	Notes
Montreal Express	Montreal, Quebec	2002	0	
Edmonton Rush	Edmonton, Alberta	2005-15	1	Became the Saskatchewan Rush in 2016.
Ontario Raiders	Hamilton, Ontario	1998	0	Became the Toronto Rock in 1999.
Ottawa Rebel	Ottawa, Ontario	2001-03	0	
Vancouver Ravens	Vancouver, British Columbia	2002-04	0	

== Major League Lacrosse ==
Former teams

Team	City	Established	Steinfeld Cup Titles	Notes
Toronto Nationals	Toronto, Ontario	2009	1	Moved to Hamilton after the 2010 season.
Hamilton Nationals	Hamilton, Ontario	2011	0	Moved to Florida after the 2013 season.

== Senior A ==
=== Current Teams ===
Team	City	Established	League Titles (1887)	Mann Cup Titles	Notes
Brampton Excelsiors	Brampton, Ontario	1912	22	8	Previously the Mimico-Brampton Combines, Brampton-Lakeshore Combines, Brampton Ramblers, Brampton Sealtests and the Bramalea Excelsiors
Brooklin Redmen	Whitby, Ontario	1966	10	7	
Kitchener-Waterloo Kodiaks	Kitchener-Waterloo, Ontario	2006	0	0	
Oakville Rock	Oakville, Ontario	2010	0	0	Previously of OLA Senior B league (2003–09).
Peterborough Lakers	Peterborough, Ontario	1968	13	8	
Six Nations Chiefs	Six Nations, Ontario	1993	4	4	

=== Former Teams ===
Team	City	Established	League Titles (1887)	Mann Cup Titles	Notes
Barrie Lakeshores	Barrie, Ontario	2004-10	0	0	
St. Regis Indians	Akwesasne	1998-2009	0	0	Previously the Akwesasne Thunder.

| Windsor Warlocks || Windsor, Ontario || 2004 || 0 || 0 ||

=== Western Lacrosse Association (BCLA) ===
Team	City	Established	League Titles (1932)	Mann Cup Titles	Notes
Burnaby Lakers	Burnaby, British Columbia	1986	0	0	Previously the Richmond Outlaws
Coquitlam Adanacs	Coquitlam, British Columbia	1965	5	1	Previously the Portland Adanacs
Langley Thunder	Langley, British Columbia	1994	0	0	Previously the North Shore Indians, Okanagan Thunder and North Shore Thunder
Maple Ridge Burrards	Maple Ridge, British Columbia	1937	14	5	Previously the Vancouver Burrard Olympics, Vancouver Burrards, Vancouver Burrard Westerns, Vancouver Combines, Vancouver Pilseners, Vancouver Carlings and Surrey Burrards
Nanaimo Timbermen	Nanaimo, British Columbia	2005	0	0	Unrelated to the old Nanaimo Timbermen franchise
New Westminster Salmonbellies	New Westminster, British Columbia	1888	28	25	Previously the New Westminster Commandos, New Westminster Salmonacs, New Westminster Royals and New Westminster O’Keefes
Victoria Shamrocks	Victoria, British Columbia	1950	17	8	Previously the Victoria Payless

== Senior B ==
=== Can-Am Senior B Lacrosse League (FNLA) ===
Team	City	Established	League Titles (1996)	Presidents Cup Titles	Notes
Allegany Arrows	Salamanca, New York		0	0	
Buffalo Creek Thunder	Buffalo, New York	2007	0	0	
Newtown Golden Eagles	Newtown, New York		8	1	2000 Presidents Cup winner.
Onondaga Redhawks	Onondaga, New York	2001	6	2	2010 & 2014 Presidents Cup winner.
Pinewoods Smoke	Irving, New York		0	0	
Six Nations Slash	Six Nations, Ontario		0	0	
Tonawanda Braves	Tonawanda, New York		0	0	
Tuscarora Tomahawks	Tuscarora, New York		0	0	

=== Ontario Senior B Lacrosse League (OLA) ===
Current Teams

Team	City	Established	League Titles (1999)	Presidents Cup Titles	Notes
Brooklin Merchants	Brooklin, Ontario	2000	1	0	
Ennismore James Gang	Ennismore, Ontario	2007	0	0	
Oakville Titans	Oakville, Ontario	2000	0	0	
Owen Sound NorthStars	Owen Sound, Ontario	2001	0	0	
Sarnia Beavers	Sarnia, Ontario	2012	0	0	
Six Nations Rivermen	Hagersville, Ontario	2013	1	0	
St. Catharines Saints	St. Catharines, Ontario	2011	3	1	2013 Presidents Cup winner.

Former teams

Team	City	Existed	League Titles (1999)	Presidents Cup Titles	Notes
Ajax-Pickering Rock	Ajax/Pickering, Ontario	2003-10	0	0	Moved To Major Series Lacrosse (Senior A) in 2010.
Barrie Lakeshores	Barrie, Ontario	2004-05	1	0	Moved to Major Series Lacrosse (Senior A) in 2005.
Burlington Chiefs	Burlington, Ontario	2001	0	0	
Huntsville Hawks	Huntsville, Ontario	2011	0	0	
Norwood Champs	Smith-Ennismore-Lakefield, Ontario	2002	0	0	Formerly known as the Smith Ennismore Lakefield Shamrocks and Norwood Nitro.
Ohsweken Warriors	Ohsweken, Ontario	2002	0	0	Formerly known as the Six Nations Crash and Mohawk Stars.
Owen Sound Woodsmen	Owen Sound, Ontario	2000	7	1	
Kitchener-Waterloo Kodiaks	Kitchener-Waterloo, Ontario	2003-06	1	2	Moved To Major Series Lacrosse (Senior A) in 2006.
St. Clair Storm	Sarnia, Ontario	2000-07	0	0	
Wellington-Dufferin Titans	Wellington County, Ontario	2000	1	1	Formerly known as the Arthur Aces and Wellington Aces.

=== Quebec Senior Lacrosse League (LCSQ) ===
Current teams

Team	City	Established	League Titles (2002)	Presidents Cup Titles	Notes
Capital Region Axemen	Ottawa, Ontario		0	0	
Kahnawake Mohawks	Kahnawake, Quebec	2008	0	0	Moved from Longueuil in 2008. Previously the Longueuil Patriotes. 2006 QSLL champions.
Kahnawake Tomahawks	Kahnawake, Quebec	2014	0	0	
Sherbrooke Extrême	Sherbrooke, Quebec	2007	0	0	Returned to QSLL in 2014.
Vermont Voyageurs	Burlington, Vermont	2009	0	0	

Former teams

Team	City	Existed	League Titles (1999)	Presidents Cup Titles	Notes
Caughnawaga Indians	Kahnawake, Quebec	2008	0	0	Previously the Lasalle Brasseurs. 2007 QSLL champions. Moved to TNSLL.
Vaudreuil Dinomytes	Vaudreuil, Quebec	2005	2	0	Previously the Valleyfield Warriors. 2005 QSLL champions.

=== Rocky Mountain Lacrosse League (ALA) ===
Current teams

Team	City	Established	League Titles (1995)	Presidents Cup Titles	Notes
Calgary Sr. Mountaineers	Calgary, Alberta	1998	1	1	
Calgary Sr. Raiders	Calgary, Alberta	2003	1	0	Previously the Calgary Sr. Raiders (2005) and the Okotoks Glacier (2003-2004) and the Okotoks Sr. Raiders (2006-2014)
Edmonton Outlaws	Edmonton, Alberta	1998	10	2	Previously the Sherwood Park Outlaws (2005-2009)
Edmonton Sr. Warriors	Edmonton, Alberta	2003	0	0	Previously the St. Albert Rams (2003-2005) and the Spruce Grove Slash (2006-2014)
Rockyview Knights	Airdrie, Alberta	2001	2	0	Previously the Calgary Knights (2001-2005,2010-2011) and the Airdrie Knights (2006-2009)
St. Albert Senior Miners	St. Albert, Alberta	2009	7	3	Previously the Edmonton Sr. Miners (2009-2010)

Former teams

Team	City	Existed	League Titles (1995)	Presidents Cup Titles	Notes
Red Deer Rage	Red Deer, Alberta	2001-2007	0	0	Folded in 2008

=== Three Nations Senior Lacrosse League (TNSLL) ===
Current Teams

Team	City	Established	League Titles (1993)	Presidents Cup Titles	Notes
Akwesasne Outlawz	Akwesasne, Ontario		1	0	
Caughnawaga Indians	Kahnawake, Quebec	2008	6	0	
Snake Island Muskies	Massena, New York		0	0	
Tyendinaga Wolfpack	Tyendinaga, Ontario	1995	0	0	

Former teams

Team	City	Existed	League Titles (1993)	Presidents Cup Titles	Notes
Akwesasne Thunder	Akwesasne, Ontario	19th century	4	2	Previously the St. Regis Indians. Moved to Major Series Lacrosse (Senior A) in 1998.
Cornwall Island Redmen					
Ganienkeh Gunners	Ganienkeh, New York	1998	0	0	
Kahnesatake Eagles	Kahnesatake, Quebec	1997	0	0	
Oneida Silverhawks	Oneida, Ontario	1998	0	0	
Onondaga Warriors	Onondaga, New York	1903	1	0	Previously known as "O.A.C."
St. Regis Braves			2	2	2011 & 2012 Presidents Cup winner
Snye Warriors	Snye, Quebec	1993	1	0	
Tuscarora Thunderhawks	Tuscarora, New York	1993	2	1	

=== West Coast Senior Lacrosse Association (BCLA) ===
Team	City	Established	League Titles	Presidents Cup Titles	Notes
Ladner Pioneers	Ladner, British Columbia	1981	6	2	
Langley Warriors	Langley, British Columbia	2009	0	0	
Nanaimo Timbermen	Nanaimo, British Columbia	1987	3	2	Previously Nanaimo Luckies.
North Shore Indians	North Vancouver, British Columbia	1968	6	3	
Port Moody Thunder	North Vancouver, British Columbia	2012	0	0	
Royal City Capitals	New Westminster, British Columbia	1989	2	0	Previously Langley Knights and New Westminster Knights
Tri-City Bandits	Port Coquitlam, British Columbia	1987	12	1	Previously Burnaby Cablevision, Burnaby Lakers, Burnaby Bandits, and Abbotsford Bandits.
Valley Rebels	Abbotsford, British Columbia	1984	3	0	Previously Surrey Rebels.
Burnaby Burrards (suspended operation 2011)	Burnaby, British Columbia	1968	2	0	Previously named Killarney, Vancouver Blue Angel Disco Sports, Vancouver Vipers (1993–1998), and Vancouver Burrards (1999–2007).
Chilliwack Mustangs (suspended operation 2012)	Chilliwack, British Columbia	2009	0	0	

== Senior C ==
=== West Central Lacrosse League (BCLA) ===
Current Teams

Team	City	Established	League Titles (1999)	Provincial Titles	Alcan Titles	Notes
Burnaby Lakers	Burnaby, British Columbia	2013	0	0	0	
Coquitlam Cobras	Coquitlam, British Columbia	2009	0	0	0	
Ladner Pioneers	Ladner, British Columbia	2009	0	0	0	
Port Coquitlam Hitmen	Port Coquitlam, British Columbia	2003	2	0	0	
Port Moody Express	Port Moody, British Columbia	2003	5	3	1	named PoCoMo Express in 2005
Richmond Roadrunners	Richmond, British Columbia	2013	0	0	0	
Ridge Attack	Maple Ridge, British Columbia	2003	0	0	0	Previously the Abbotsford Attack (2003–2008)
Vancouver Burrards	Vancouver, British Columbia	2003	0	0	1	named Vancouver Vipers in 2003-2005

Former Teams

Team	City	Established	League Titles (1999)	Provincial Titles	Alcan Titles	Notes
North Shore Indians	North Vancouver, British Columbia	2005	0	0	1	
West Van Outlaws	West Vancouver, British Columbia	2008	0	0	0	

=== Rocky Mountain Lacrosse League (ALA) ===
Team	City	Established	League Titles (2011)	Alcan Titles	Notes
Airdrie Mohawks	Airdrie, Alberta	2014	0	0	
Blackfalds Silverbacks	Blackfalds, Alberta	2011	4	0	Previously the Red Deer IFR Workwear Silverbacks (2011–2012)
Calgary Irish	Calgary, Alberta	2010	1	0	Previously the Calgary Bowmen (2011)
Edmonton Warriors	Edmonton, Alberta	2010	0	0	Previously the Tomahawks Senior Lacrosse Club (2011-2014)
Grande Prairie Thrashers	Grande Prairie, Alberta	2015	0	0	
Lethbridge Pioneers	Lethbridge, Alberta	2011	0	0	
Okotoks Erratic	Okotoks, Alberta	2010	0	0	Previously the Okotoks Rock (2011)
Vermilion Rage	Vermilion, Alberta	2012	0	0	

=== Circuit Québécois de Crosse Senior (FCQ) ===
Current teams

Team	City	Established	League Titles (2008)	Alcan Titles	Notes
East Angus Wolfs	East Angus, Quebec	2011	0	0	
Longueuil Patriotes	Longueuil, Quebec	2008	1	0	
Wendake Ahki’wahcha’	Wendake, Quebec	2014	0	0	
Windsor Aigles	Windsor, Quebec	2008	2	0	2014 and 2015 league champion.

Former teams

Team	City	Existed	League Titles (2008)	Alcan Titles	Notes
East Angus Ravens	East Angus, Quebec	2008	0	0	Folded
Magog Memphrés	Magog, Quebec	2009	0	0	
Shawinigan Éclairs	Shawinigan, Quebec	2008	0	0	
Sherbrooke Extrême	Sherbrooke, Quebec	2009	4	0	Moved back to QSLL Senior B in 2014.
Valleyfield Asterix	Valleyfield, Quebec	2009	0	0	

== Junior A ==
=== Ontario Junior Lacrosse League (OLA) ===
Team	City	Established	League Titles (1961)	Minto Cup Titles	Notes
Akwesasne Jr. Indians	Akwesasne	2007	0	0	Did not play in 2012
Brampton Excelsiors	Brampton, Ontario	1883	3	1	Previously the Brampton ABC's and Bramalea Excelsiors
Barrie Tornado	Barrie, Ontario	2000	0	0	Moved to OLA Jr A at start of 2009 season, won Founders Cup in 2003
Burlington Chiefs	Burlington, Ontario	1976	0	0	Previously the Hamilton Bengals and Bay Area Bengals
Kitchener-Waterloo Braves	Kitchener-Waterloo, Ontario	1976	0	0	Previously the Kitchener Braves; Previously played in OLA Junior B where they won one league title and two Founders Cups
Mississauga Tomahawks	Mississauga, Ontario	1973	0	0	Previously the Mississauga Athletics, Mississauga Sullivan Homes, Mississauga Merchants and Mississauga Arrowheads; Previously played in OLA Junior B where they won two league titles and one Founders Cups
Orangeville Northmen	Orangeville, Ontario	1975	4	3	Previously the Orangeville Stingers; Previously played in OLA Junior C where they won one league title; Previously played in OLA Junior B where they won two league titles and two Founders Cups
Orillia Rama Kings	Orillia, Ontario	1973	0	0	Previously the Orillia Lions, Orillia 501 Kings and Orillia Rogers Kings; Previously played in OLA Junior C; Previously played in OLA Junior B where they won three league titles and two Founders Cups
Ottawa Titans	Ottawa, Ontario	2005	0	0	
Peterborough Lakers	Peterborough, Ontario	????	13	12	Previously the Hastings Legionnaires, Peterborough Petes, Peterborough Tee-Pees, Peterborough Gray-Munros, Peterborough Century 21, Peterborough James Gang, Peterborough Maulers, Peterborough Traders and Peterborough Javelins " Peterborough P.C.O.s
St. Catharines Athletics	St. Catharines, Ontario	????	5	3	Previously the St. Catharines Supertests, St. Catharines Lakesides and St. Catharines Legionaires
Six Nations Arrows	Six Nations, Ontario	1974	6	2	Previously the Six Nations Braves Previously played in OLA Junior C and Junior B
Toronto Beaches	Toronto, Ontario	1976	0	0	Previously played in OLA Junior B
Whitby Warriors	Whitby, Ontario	????	7	5	Previously the Whitby Consolidated Builders

=== BC Junior A Lacrosse League (BCLA) ===
Team	City	Established	League Titles	Minto Cup Titles	Notes
Burnaby Lakers	Burnaby, British Columbia	????	??	8	Previously the Burnaby Cablevision
Coquitlam Adanacs	Coquitlam, British Columbia	????	??	0	
Delta Islanders	Delta, British Columbia	????	??	0	
New Westminster Salmonbellies	New Westminster, British Columbia	????	??	3	Previously the New Westminster Salmonacs
Port Coquitlam Saints	Port Coquitlam, British Columbia	1995	??	0	
Nanaimo Timbermen	Nanaimo, British Columbia	2004	??	0	
Langley Thunder	Langley, British Columbia	????	??	0	Previously the Surrey Stickmen
Victoria Shamrocks	Victoria, British Columbia	????	??	1	Previously the Victoria MacDonalds, Esquimalt Legion and Victoria Eagles

=== Rocky Mountain Lacrosse League (ALA) ===
Team	City	Established	League Titles (2003)	Minto Cup Titles	Notes
Calgary Mountaineers	Calgary, Alberta	2006	0	0	
Calgary Raiders	Calgary, Alberta	2003	1	0	
Edmonton Eclipse	Edmonton, Alberta	2006	0	0	
St. Albert Miners	St. Albert, Alberta	2003	4	0	Previous known as Edmonton Miners
Saskatchewan SWAT	Saskatoon, Saskatchewan	2016	0	0	

== Junior B ==
=== West Coast Junior Lacrosse League (BCLA) ===
Team	City	Established	League Titles	Founders Cup Titles	Notes
Burnaby Lakers	Burnaby, British Columbia				
Coquitlam Adanacs	Coquitlam, British Columbia				
Delta Islanders	Delta, British Columbia				
Langley Warriors	Langley, British Columbia				
New Westminster Salmonbellies	New Westminster, British Columbia				
North Shore Indians	North Vancouver, British Columbia				
Port Coquitlam Saints	Port Coquitlam, British Columbia				
Port Moody Thunder	Port Moody, British Columbia	2009			
Richmond Roadrunners	Richmond, British Columbia	2009			
Ridge Meadows Burrards	Maple Ridge, British Columbia	2006			
Surrey Rebels	Surrey, British Columbia	2006			

=== Ontario Junior B Lacrosse League (OLA) ===
Team	City	Established	League Titles	Founders Cup Titles	Notes
Akwesasne Lightning	Akwesasne, Ontario	1970	0	0	Previously the St. Regis Braves, St. Regis Mohawks, and St. Regis Indians
Barrie Tornado	Barrie, Ontario	2000	1	1	Moved to OLA Jr A at start of 2009 season
Brampton Excelsiors	Brampton, Ontario	2012	0	0	Previously played OLA Jr B from 1989 to 1994 when franchise moved to Milton. That franchise is currently the Mississauga Tomahawks. Returned to OLA Jr B at start of 2012 season as a new franchise.
Clarington Green Gaels	Clarington, Ontario	1963	2	4	Previously the Oshawa Green Gaels; Previously played in OLA Junior A where they won seven league titles and seven Minto Cups
Cornwall Celtics	Cornwall, Ontario	2006	0	0	
Elora Mohawks	Elora, Ontario	1967	2	5	Previously the Fergus Thistles and Guelph Mohawks; Previously played in OLA Junior A; Has won three Castrol Cups
Gloucester Griffins	Gloucester, Ontario	1978	2	0	
Guelph Regals	Guelph, Ontario	1992	0	0	
Halton Hills Bulldogs	Halton Hills, Ontario	1995	1	1	Previously the Georgetown Bulldogs
Hamilton Bengals	Hamilton, Ontario	2006	0	0	
Huntsville Hawks	Huntsville, Ontario	1965	1	1	Previously the Huntsville Legionaires and Huntsville Tornadoes; Previously played in OLA Junior C and OLA Junior A; Has won one Castrol Cup
Kahnawake Jr. Mohawks	Kahnawake, Quebec	1970	0	0	Previously the Caughnawaga Indians; Moved to I.L.A.
London Blue Devils	London, Ontario	2003	0	0	
Markham Ironheads	Markham, Ontario	2002	0	0	
Mimico Mountaineers	Toronto, Ontario	1993	0	0	Previously played in OLA Junior A
Mississauga Tomahawks	Mississauga, Ontario	1989	0	0	Previously the Brampton Excelsiors, Brampton-Milton Mavericks, Milton Mavericks, and Mississauga Tomahawks
Nepean Knights	Nepean, Ontario	1993	0	0	
Niagara Thunderhawks	Niagara-on-the-Lake, Ontario	2003	0	0	
Oakville Buzz	Oakville, Ontario	2001	1	1	
Orangeville Northmen	Orangeville, Ontario	2001	0	0	
Orillia Rama Kings	Orillia, Ontario	1980	3	2	Previously played Jr C from 1973 to 1979, Jr A from 1998 to 2008. Return to OLA Jr B at start of 2009
Owen Sound NorthStars	Owen Sound, Ontario	1973	3	2	Previously the Owen Sound Rams, Owen Sound Satellites, Owen Sound Forsythes, Owen Sound Signmen and Owen Sound Flying Dutchmen; Previously played in OLA Junior C where they won three league titles
Sarnia Pacers	Sarnia, Ontario	1973	4	4	Previously the Point Edward Easy Movers and Point Edward Pacers; Previously played in OLA Junior C
Newmarket Saints	Newmarket, Ontario	2008	2	2	Relocated from Scarborough in 2008
Six Nations Rebels	Six Nations 40, Ontario	1996	4	4	Known as the Six Nations Red Rebels from 1996 to 2001.
St. Catharines Spartans	St. Catharines, Ontario	1979	3	3	Previously known as Spartan Warriors, Niagara Warriors, Niagara-on-the-Lake Warriors and Niagara Spartan Warriors
Wallaceburg Red Devils	Wallaceburg, Ontario	1998	1	1	
Welland Warlords	Welland, Ontario	2001	0	0	
Windsor Clippers	Windsor, Ontario	2003	0	0	Previously known as the Windsor Warlocks and Windsor AKO Fratmen

=== Rocky Mountain Lacrosse League (ALA) ===
==== Current Teams ====
Team	City	Established	League Titles (1995)	Founders Cup Titles	Notes
Barracuda lacrosse club	Regina, Saskatchewan	2018	0	0	
Calgary Chill	Calgary, Alberta	2004	0	0	
Calgary Mountaineers	Calgary, Alberta	2002	9	1	Previously the Calgary Warthogs
Calgary Shamrocks	Calgary, Alberta	2002	2	1	
Edmonton Warriors	Edmonton, Alberta	2002	3	0	
Fort Saskatchewan Rebels	Fort Saskatchewan, Alberta	2010	0	0	
Lethbridge Cudas (Tier I)	Lethbridge, Alberta	2018	0	0	
Manitoba Gryphons	Winnipeg, Manitoba	2011	0	0	
Northern Alberta Crude	St. Albert, Alberta	2004	0	0	Previously the St. Albert Rams
Red Deer Rampage	Red Deer, Alberta	2006	0	0	
Rockyview Silvertips	Cochrane, Alberta	2006	0	0	
Saskatchewan SWAT	Saskatoon, Saskatchewan	2007	0	0	
Sherwood Park Titans	Sherwood Park, Alberta	2004	0	0	

==== Former Teams ====
Team	City	Existed	League Titles (1995)	Founders Cup Titles	Notes
Medicine Hat Sundevils	Medicine Hat, Alberta	2002-??	0	0	
South Saskatchewan Stealth	Regina, Saskatchewan	2008	0	0	

=== Quebec Junior Lacrosse League - Ligue de Crosse Junior du Québec (FCQ) ===
Current teams

Team	City	Established	League Titles (2003)	Founders Cup Titles	Notes
Longueuil Patriotes	Longueuil, Quebec	2007	1	0	
Montreal WILA Nationals	Pointe-Claire, Quebec	2005	1	0	Previously the West-Island Shamrocks (2005–07)
Sherbrooke Jr. Extrême	Sherbrooke, Quebec	2003	4	0	Previously Sherbrooke Express (2003)
Windsor Aigles	Windsor, Quebec	2003	1	0	

Former teams

Team	City	Existed	League Titles (2003)	Founders Cup Titles	Notes
Laval Rebels	Laval, Quebec	2007	0	0	
Montréal Éperviers	Montreal, Quebec	2003	0	0	
St-Hubert Bulldogs	Saint-Hubert, Quebec	2003-05	0	0	Previously the Longueuil Bulldogs (2003)
Kahnawake Jr. Mohawks	Kahnawake, Quebec	2005	1	0	Moved to the ILA
Akwesasne Eagles	Akwesasne	2005	0	0	Moved to the ILA
Shawinigan Éclairs	Grand-Mère, Quebec	2005-07	0	0	
Lasalle Brasseurs	LaSalle, Quebec	2006	0	0	
St-Laurent Braves	St-Laurent, Quebec	2006-07	0	0	Previously the St-Laurent Patriotes (2006)
Valleyfield Astérix	Valleyfield, Quebec	2007-08	0	0	Moved to Senior C

=== Prairie Gold Lacrosse League (SLA) ===
Team	City	Established	League Titles (2001)	Founders Cup Titles	Notes
Assiniboia Attack	Assiniboia, Saskatchewan	2001	0	0	
Big River Extreme	Big River, Saskatchewan	2001	0	0	Previously the Big River Bulldogs
Moose Jaw Mustangs	Moose Jaw, Saskatchewan	2002	6	0	
Prince Albert Predators	Prince Albert, Saskatchewan	2003	0	0	
Regina Heat	Regina, Saskatchewan	2003	0	0	
Regina Riot	Regina, Saskatchewan	2003	0	0	
Regina Rifles	Regina, Saskatchewan	2010	0	0	
Saskatoon Brewers	Saskatoon, Saskatchewan	2005	0	0	
Saskatoon Smash	Saskatoon, Saskatchewan	2001	1	0	
Saskatoon Steelers	Saskatoon, Saskatchewan	2004	0	0	
Swift Current Rampage	Swift Current, Saskatchewan	2003	0	0	
Standing Buffalo Fighting Sioux	Standing Buffalo Dakota Nation	2019	0	0	
Yorkton Bulldogs	Yorkton, Saskatchewan	2003	0	0	

=== East Coast Junior Lacrosse League ===
Team	Area	Established	League Titles (2004)	Founders Cup Titles	Notes
Halifax Hurricanes	Nova Scotia	2005	7	N/A	
Dartmouth Bandits	Nova Scotia	2005	7	N/A	
St. Margaret's Bay Rebels	Nova Scotia	2019	3	N/A	Formerly the Halifax Northwest Rebels & Halifax Northwest Marley Lions
Sackville Wolves	Nova Scotia	2005	0	N/A	
Mi'kmaq Warriors	Nova Scotia	2015	0		
Saint John Rebels	New Brunswick	2022	0		
~~Moncton Mavericks~~	~~New Brunswick~~		0	0	Folded in 2020

=== Iroquois Lacrosse Association (ILA) ===
Team	Area	Established	League Titles (2006)	Founders Cup Titles	Notes
Akwesasne Eagles	Akwesasne	2005	0	0	Previously of the Quebec Junior Lacrosse League
Kahnawake Jr. Mohawks	Kahnawake, Quebec	1970	2	0	Previously of the OLA Jr. B Council (1970–2001) Previously of the Quebec Junior Lacrosse League
Onondaga Redhawks	Onondaga, New York	1998	1	0	Previously Members of the OLA Jr. B Council (Onondaga Warriors)
Tyendinaga Wolfpack	Tyendinaga, Ontario	2006	0	0	

=== Red River Lacrosse Association (MLA) ===
Team	Area	Established	League Titles (Since 2007)	Founders Cup Titles	Notes
Sagkeeng Ojibway Jr.	Sagkeeng First Nation, Manitoba	????	1	0	
St. Andrews Wizards	St. Andrews, Manitoba	????	0	0	
Winnipeg Falcons	Winnipeg, Manitoba	????	1	0	
Winnipeg Gryphons	Winnipeg, Manitoba	????	2	0	Represents Manitoba at the Founders Cup
Winnipeg Shamrocks	Winnipeg, Manitoba	????	0	0	
Winnipeg Sidewinders	Winnipeg, Manitoba	????	0	0	

== Junior C ==
=== Ontario Junior C Lacrosse League (OLA) ===
Team	Area	Established	League Titles	Notes
Caledon Bandits	Caledon, Ontario	2008	1	Inaugural champions. Applied for entry into Ontario Junior B league. Won title in 2009 over Peterboro
Centre Wellington Warlords	Centre Wellington, Ontario	2008	0	Inaugural season finalists. Became Fergus Thistles
Innisfil Wolfpack	Innisfil, Ontario	2008	0	
Shelburne Vets	Shelburne, Ontario	2008-2017	0	
West Durham Patriots	Pickering, Ontario		0	moved to Whitby Warriors in 2009

== Intermediate A ==
=== BC Intermediate Lacrosse League (BCLA) ===
Team	City	Established	League Titles	Notes
Burnaby Lakers	Burnaby, British Columbia			
Coquitlam Adanacs	Coquitlam, British Columbia			British Columbia Provincial Champions 2009
Delta Islanders	Delta, British Columbia			
Langley Thunder	Langley, British Columbia			Previously the Surrey Stickmen
Maple Ridge Burrards	Maple Ridge, British Columbia	2012		
Nanaimo Timbermen	Nanaimo, British Columbia			
New Westminster Salmonbellies	New Westminster, British Columbia			British Columbia Provincial Champions 2007, 2008, 2011
Port Coquitlam Saints	Port Coquitlam, British Columbia			
Richmond Roadrunners	Richmond, British Columbia	2010		
Victoria Shamrocks	Victoria, British Columbia			British Columbia Provincial Champions 2010

== Intermediate B ==
=== BC Intermediate Lacrosse League (BCLA) ===
Team	City	Established	League Titles	Notes
Burnaby Lakers	Burnaby, British Columbia			
Coquitlam Adanacs	Coquitlam, British Columbia			British Columbia Provincial Champions 2005, 2006, 2007, and 2008
Delta Islanders	Ladner, British Columbia			
Langley Warriors	Langley, British Columbia			
New Westminster Salmonbellies	New Westminster, British Columbia			British Columbia Provincial Champions 2003 and 2004
North Delta Hawks	North Delta, British Columbia	2008		
North Shore Indians	North Vancouver, British Columbia			
Port Coquitlam Saints	Port Coquitlam, British Columbia			
Port Moody Thunder	Port Moody, British Columbia	2007		
Richmond Roadrunners	Richmond, British Columbia			
Ridge Meadows Burrards	Maple Ridge, British Columbia	2006		
Surrey Rebels	Surrey, British Columbia	2007		

=== Vancouver Island Intermediate Lacrosse League (BCLA) ===
Team	City	Established	League Titles	
Cowichan Thunder	Cowichan Valley, British Columbia			
Parksville Sharks	Parksville, British Columbia			
Nanaimo Timbermen	Nanaimo, British Columbia			
Westshore Whalers (JDF)	Langford, British Columbia		3	British Columbia Provincial Champions 2009, 2010, and 2011
Peninsula Warriors	North Saanich, British Columbia			
Saanich Tigers	Saanich, British Columbia			

== Championships by province ==
The national championship trophies contested for at various levels of professional and amateur lacrosse in Canada:

Level	Title	Established	B.C.	AB	SK	ON	QC	Iroquois
NLL	Champion's Cup	1987	5	1	1	1	0	N/A
MLL	Steinfeld Cup	2001	N/A	N/A	N/A	1	N/A	N/A
Senior A	Mann Cup	1901	50	1	0	42	5	8
Senior B	Presidents Cup	1964	20	3	0	13	0	5
Junior A	Minto Cup	1938 (Note: The Minto Cup was awarded as a senior title from 1901 to 1936.)	45	0	0	18	0	2
Junior B	Founders Cup	1964	39	2	0	2	5	2

== See also ==
- Canadian Lacrosse League
- Ontario Lacrosse Association
- Rocky Mountain Lacrosse League
- Western Lacrosse Association
