= Six Nations Rivermen =

- City: Ohsweken, Ontario
- League: OLA Senior B Lacrosse League
- Founded: 2001
- Home arena: Iroquois Lacrosse Arena
- Colours: Black, Red, and White

Franchise history
- 2001: Six Nations Crash
- 2002: Six Nations Stars
- 2003–2008: Mohawk Stars
- 2009–2011: Ohsweken Warriors
- 2013-Present: Six Nations Rivermen

Championships
- Ontario Series Lacrosse: (7) 2014, 2015, 2017, 2019, 2022, 2024, 2026
- Presidents Cup: (2) 2015, 2019

The Six Nations Rivermen are a Senior box lacrosse team. The team played in the City of Ohsweken, Ontario, Canada and participate in the OLA Senior B Lacrosse League. They most recently won the Presidents Cup in 2019, and the OLA Senior B League in 2024.

== History ==
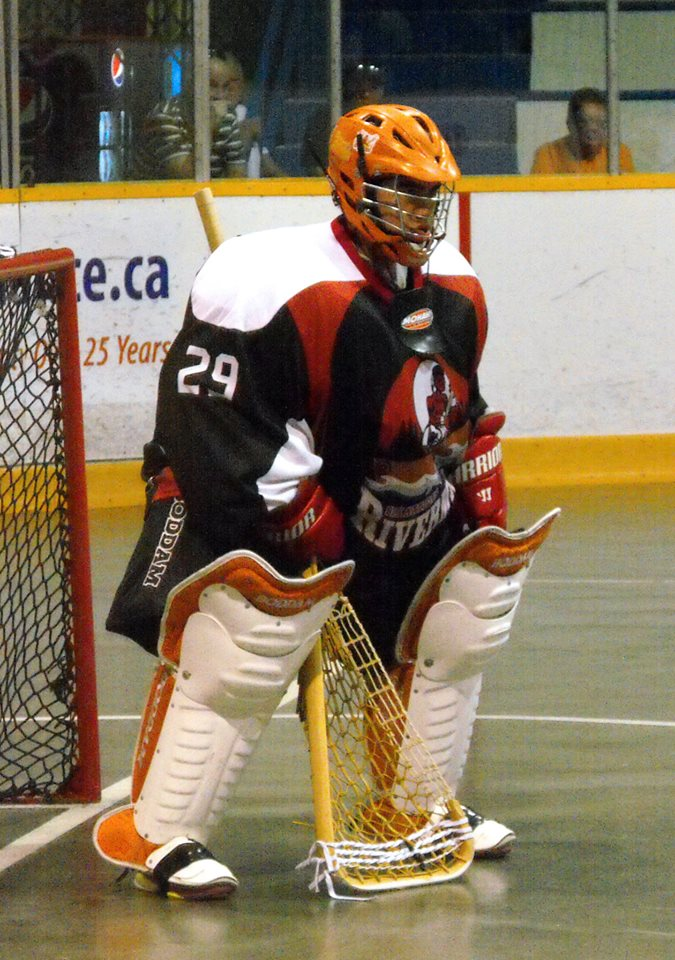
Rivermen's Brenner Jacobs during 2014 season.

The Rivermen were founded in 2001 as the Six Nations Crash, they were soon renamed the Mohawk Stars. The team sat out the 2012 season to reorganize and came back as the Rivermen.

Since returning as the Rivermen, the team has found its stride. In 2013, the Rivermen finished the season in second place with 11 wins and 5 losses. The Rivermen would beat the Norwood James Gang 3-straight in the semi-final, but were swept in 3 games by the eventual Presidents Cup champions, the St. Catharines Saints.

In 2014, Six Nations would finish the season in third place with 11 wins and 5 losses. In the league quarter-final they would defeat the Sarnia Beavers 2-games-to-none and in the semi-final they would upset the defending national champions with a 3-games-to-none sweep. In the league final, the Rivermen would play the Ennismore James Gang, the first place team in the league, and beat them 3-games-to-1 to clinch the OLA championship. With a berth into the Presidents Cup, the Rivermen would travel to Coquitlam, British Columbia to compete against the best of the country. They opened the tournament with a 14–12 loss to the Onondaga Redhawks and a 10–8 loss to the St. Albert Miners. The Rivermen came together in the next game and beat the Kahnawake Mohawks 9–8, then the Nanaimo Timbermen 8–5, Akwesasne Outlawz 14–9, and the Tri-City Bandits 9–7 to finish the round robin 4–2–0 and in fourth place. In the semi-final, the Rivermen would beat Kahnawake 8–4 to get to the finals. Despite leading most of the game, in the final the Onondaga Redhawks would come from behind to win the national title with a 9–7 win. Warren Hill and Wayne VanEvery would be named to the all-star teams.

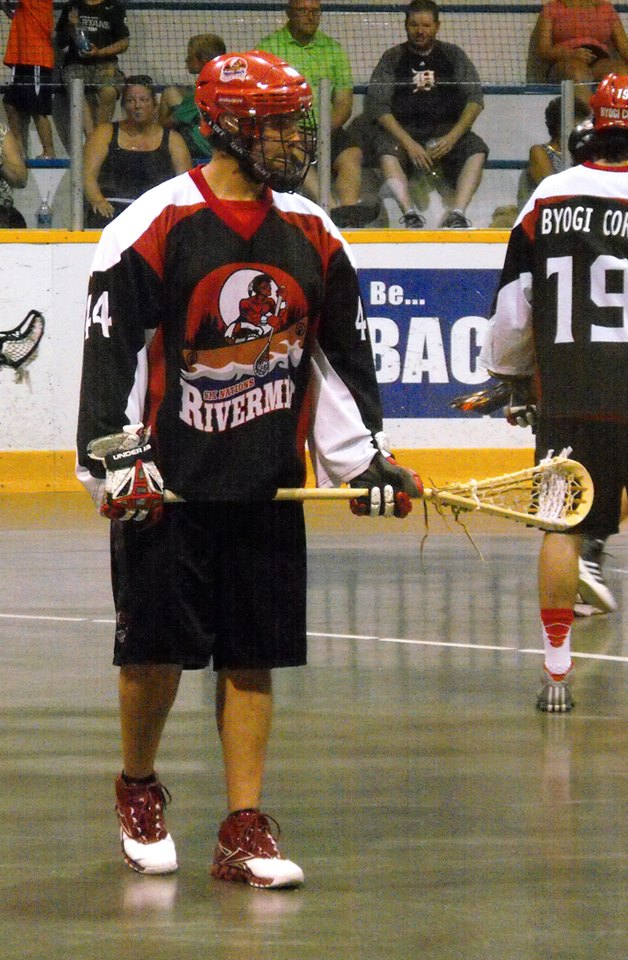
Isaiah Kicknosway of Six Nations Rivermen in 2014.

In 2015, the Rivermen would the regular season title, the OLA championship, and the Presidents Cup. After finishing in first place in the OSBLL with a record of 12 wins and 4 losses, the Rivermen would sweep both the Oakville Titans and the Brooklin Merchants with 3-game-sweeps. The Rivermen then travelled to St. Catharines, Ontario to compete for the Presidents Cup for the second straight year. Six Nations began with a 14–4 win over the Rockyview Knights, then a 14–11 loss to the Snake Island Muskies, but the Rivermen would turn around their fortunes with a 15–7 win over the Nanaimo Timbermen. In the semi-final, the Rivermen would avenge their 2014 title loss with a 12–10 win over the Onondaga Redhawks, before beating the Capital Region Axemen 14–11 to take the national championship.

== Season-by-season results ==
Season	GP	W	L	T	GF	GA	P	Results	Playoffs
2001	14	4	10	0	124	169	9	5th OSBLL	DNQ
2002	14	12	2	2	200	131	24	1st OSBLL	Lost final
2003	16	4	12	0	132	189	8	8th OSBLL	Lost quarter-final
2004	16	6	10	0	147	186	12	7th OSBLL	Lost quarter-final
2005	14	9	5	0	148	116	18	3rd OSBLL	Lost final
2006	14	5	8	1	131	131	11	5th OSBLL	Lost quarter-final
2007	14	7	7	0	107	114	14	3rd OSBLL	Lost semi-final
2008	14	2	11	1	96	146	5	6th OSBLL	Lost quarter-final
2009	16	2	14	0	157	249	4	5th OSBLL	DNQ
2010	16	7	9	0	205	187	14	5th OSBLL	DNQ
2011	16	3	13	0	126	210	6	7th OSBLL	DNQ
2012	Did not participate								
2013	16	11	5	0	182	148	22	2nd OSBLL	Lost final
2014	16	11	5	0	178	135	22	3rd OSBLL	Won League, lost Presidents Cup final
2015	16	12	4	0	158	104	24	1st OSBLL	Won League, won Presidents Cup

== Presidents Cup results ==
Season	Location	GP	W	L	T	GF	GA	Result
2014	Coquitlam, BC	8	5	3	0	75	66	Won Silver
2015	St. Catharines, ON	5	4	1	0	65	46	Won Gold
2019	Kahnawake, QC	8	6	1	1	91	64	Won Gold
2022	Edmonton, AB	8	5	3	0	92	63	Won Bronze
2023	Oakville, ON	6	2	4	0	35	45	Finished 6th
2024	Ladner, BC	6	2	3	1	60	60	Finished 5th

== See also ==
- OLA Senior B Lacrosse League
- Presidents Cup (box lacrosse)
