= Harry Lumley Bayshore Community Centre =

Multi-purpose arena in Owen Sound, Ontario

Coordinates: 44°34′48″N 80°56′3″W

- "The Bayshore"
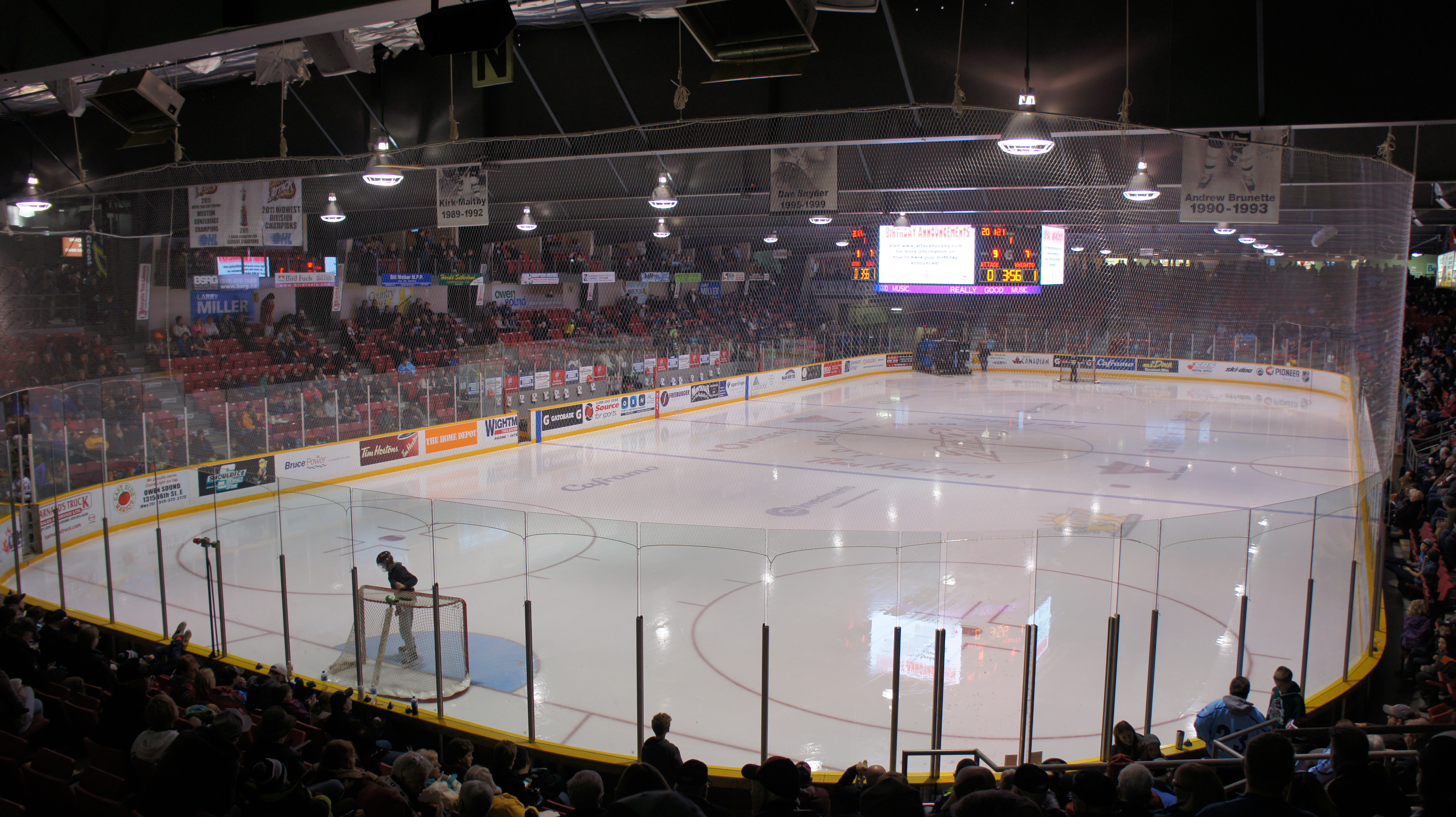

- Location within Ontario Location within Canada
- Location: 1900 3rd Avenue East; Owen Sound, Ontario, Canada
- Owner: City of Owen Sound
- Capacity: Hockey 3,500; Lacrosse 3,500

Construction
- Opened: 1983

Tenants
- Owen Sound Platers/Attack (OHL) (1989-present); Owen Sound Greys (GOJHL) (1983-2009); Owen Sound NorthStars (OSBLL) (2001-present); Owen Sound Jr. North Stars (OJBLL) (1983-present)

The Harry Lumley Bayshore Community Centre contains the J.D. McArthur Arena, a 4,300-seat multi-purpose arena in Owen Sound, Ontario, Canada. The facility was opened in 1983 on the east shore of Georgian Bay (hence its name) and replaced the city's old downtown arena.

Known locally as "Bayshore Arena," it is home to the Owen Sound Attack of the Ontario Hockey League, the Owen Sound Woodsmen of the OLA Senior B Lacrosse League and the Owen Sound Rams of the OLA Junior B Lacrosse League and was the home of the Owen Sound Greys formerly of the Greater Ontario Junior Hockey League. The arena is dedicated to the memory of local hockey hero and Hockey Hall of Famer Harry Lumley.

The community centre was substantially renovated from 2000 to 2002, adding private boxes, more seating and a new front entrance. The complex had also previously been renamed the "Harry Lumley Bayshore Community Centre" in honour of Hockey Hall of Fame goaltender Harry Lumley, who was born and raised in Owen Sound and began his hockey career there. He retired to his hometown and lived there until his death in 1998.

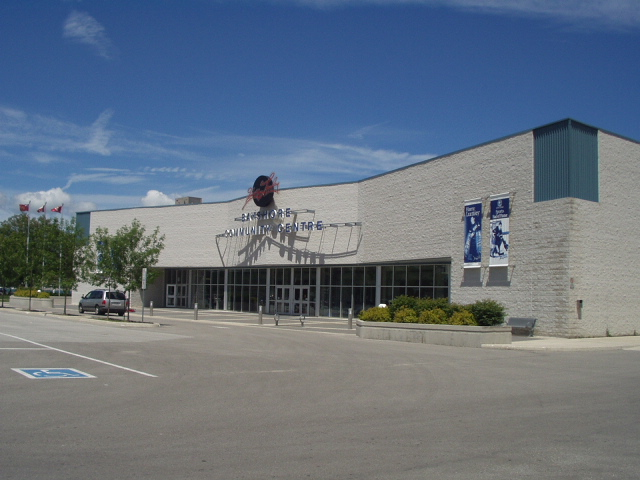
The exterior of the Bayshore Community Centre

Joseph Donald "J.D." McArthur was a longtime local sportsman and businessman who played for, coached and sponsored sports teams in Owen Sound for many years. A story published in the city's newspaper at the time of his death in 2002 said he also served as the city's arena commissioner for 26 years and was instrumental in the construction of the Bayshore.

The Owen Sound Sports Hall of Fame was established in 1981 and is also housed in the community centre. Harry Lumley and J.D. McArthur are among the many individuals and teams who have been enshrined there.
