= Jordan Younger =

American gridiron football player and coach (born 1978)

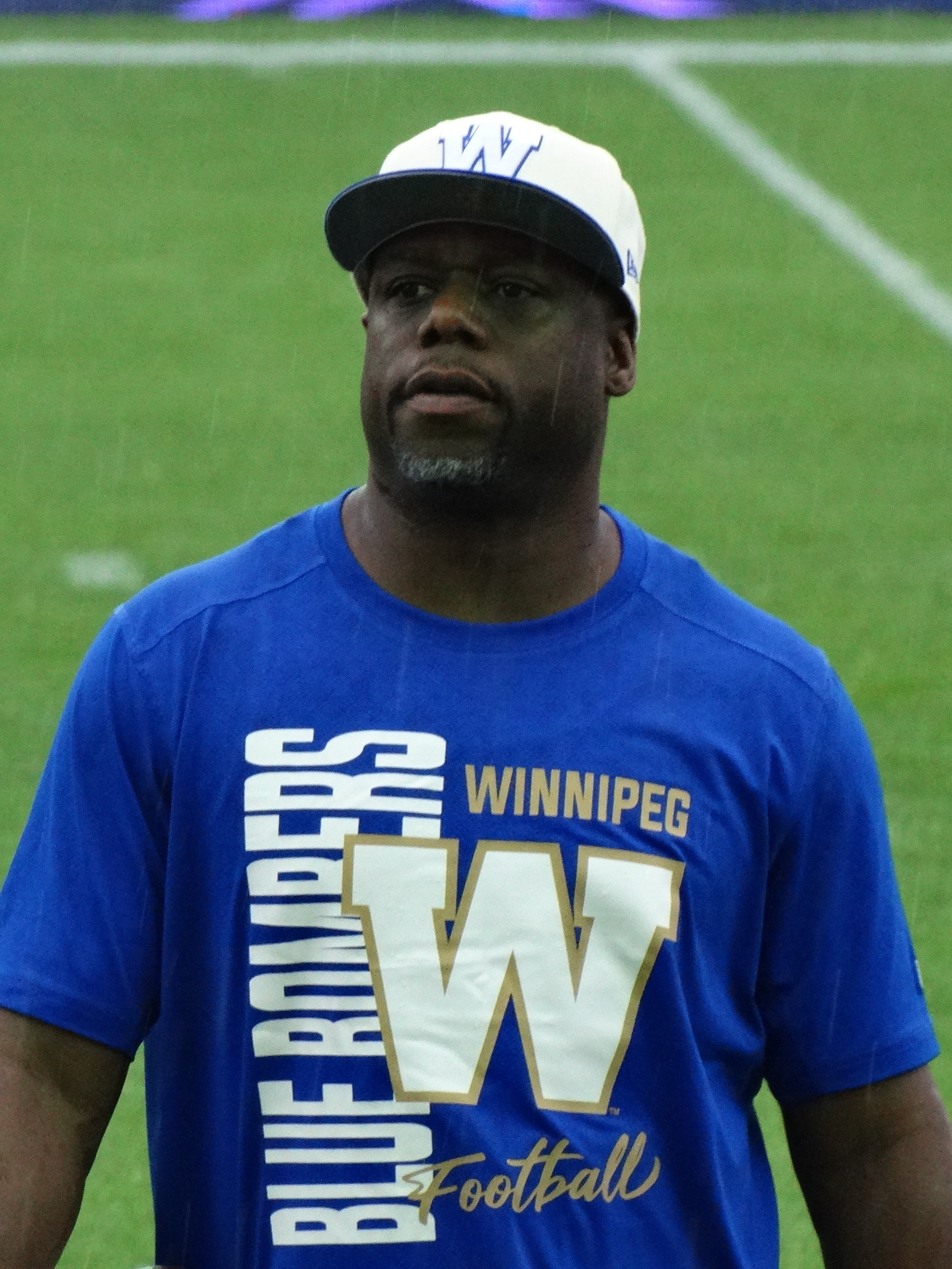
- Younger with the Winnipeg Blue Bombers in 2025

Winnipeg Blue Bombers
- Title: Defensive coordinator

Personal information
- Born: January 24, 1978 (age 48); Trenton, New Jersey, U.S.
- Listed height: 5 ft 10 in (1.78 m)
- Listed weight: 190 lb (86 kg)

Career information
- College: Connecticut
- NFL draft: 2000: undrafted

Career history

Playing
- Arizona Cardinals (2000); Rhein Fire (2001–2002); Amsterdam Admirals (2003); Washington Redskins (2003)*; Indiana Firebirds (2004); Toronto Argonauts (2004–2007); Edmonton Eskimos (2008); Toronto Argonauts (2009–2012)
- * Offseason or practice squad member only

Coaching
- Oakville Titans (2013) Defensive backs coach; Toronto Varsity Blues (2014) Defensive backs coach; Toronto Argonauts (2015–2016) Defensive backs coach; Winnipeg Blue Bombers (2018–2023) Defensive backs coach; Winnipeg Blue Bombers (2024–present) Defensive coordinator

Awards and highlights
- As player: 2× Grey Cup champion (2004, 2012); As coach: 2× Grey Cup champion (2019, 2021)
- Stats at CFL.ca (archive)
- Stats at ArenaFan.com

Jordan Younger (born January 24, 1978) is the defensive coordinator for the Winnipeg Blue Bombers of the Canadian Football League (CFL). He is also a former professional defensive back and played for nine years in the CFL where he won two Grey Cup championships with the Toronto Argonauts.

== College career ==
Younger majored in political science at the University of Connecticut where he also played college football and holds the school record for career kick return touchdowns with four.

== Professional playing career ==
=== NFL Europe ===
Younger played cornerback and returned kicks on special teams for the Rhein Fire from 2001 to 2002 and the Amsterdam Admirals in 2003. He was named to the All-NFL Europe team in 2002 and 2003.

=== Toronto Argonauts ===
Younger's CFL career began with the Toronto Argonauts in 2004 when he led the team with 11 pass knockdowns and won a Grey Cup championship. He was named a CFL All-Star in 2005 and 2007.

=== Edmonton Eskimos ===
On February 15, 2008, Younger was traded to the Edmonton Eskimos for running back Tyler Ebell and wide receiver T. J. Acree. He made 53 tackles and 1 interception while playing for Edmonton. He was released by the Eskimos on January 7, 2009.

=== Toronto Argonauts (II) ===
On January 13, 2009, Younger was signed to play again for the Argonauts. On February 10, 2010, Younger was released by the Argonauts, but was later re-signed by the team on March 4, 2010. On November 25, 2012, Younger won the 100th Grey Cup with the Argonauts, serving as their defensive captain. On November 27, 2012, Younger accompanied the Grey Cup during the Argonauts' championship parade. On June 2, 2013, Younger did not attend the mandatory training camp sessions as he was preparing for retirement.

== Football coaching career ==
=== Oakville Titans ===
In 2013, Younger served as defensive backs coach for the Oakville Titans.

=== Toronto Varsity Blues ===
In 2014, Younger served as the defensive backs coach for the University of Toronto Varsity Blues of CIS football.

=== Toronto Argonauts ===
On May 18, 2015, Younger was named the defensive backs coach for the Toronto Argonauts, marking his return to the organization since winning the 100th Grey Cup championship in 2012 as their defensive captain.

=== Winnipeg Blue Bombers ===
On January 5, 2018, it was announced that Younger was hired as the Defensive Backs Coach for the Winnipeg Blue Bombers. He won his third Grey Cup championship and first as a coach when the Blue Bombers defeated the Hamilton Tiger-Cats in the 107th Grey Cup game. He won his fourth championship in the next season when the Blue Bombers repeated as champions following their 108th Grey Cup victory.

On January 8, 2024, it was announced that Younger had been promoted to defensive coordinator.
