= Presidents Cup (box lacrosse) =

Lacrosse championship

- Sport: Box Lacrosse
- First season: 1964
- Most recent champion: Edmonton Miners (2026)
- Most titles: Fergus Thistles (6)
- Website: Presidents Cup website

The Presidents Cup is the national Senior-level box lacrosse championship for the Canadian Lacrosse Association. The annual Championship awards a "Gold", "Silver", and "Bronze" placing. The skill levels have been adjusted in recent years; Senior "B" teams from across Canada now compete for the Presidents Cup (as before it was all Senior teams). Senior "A" is now represented by Ontario's Major Series Lacrosse and the Western Lacrosse Association (British Columbia), who compete for the Mann Cup.

== History ==
There have been three trophies used for the Presidents Cup championships. The original trophy was known as the Castrol Oil Presidents Trophy and was awarded to teams from 1964 until 1971.

In 1972, a new trophy was donated as a replacement and the old Castrol Oil trophy retired. The second trophy was in use from 1972 until 1995 when it too was retired. While the original Castrol Oil trophy was donated to the Canadian Lacrosse Hall of Fame in 1979, the second trophy was put into storage and became forgotten. Its existence was completely unknown to the Canadian Lacrosse Hall of Fame until the Canadian Lacrosse Association contacted the hall in late 2016 when it was found in their storage, which was donated to the lacrosse hall in February 2016. The original trophy underwent restoration work in 2015-2016 however the second trophy is still in need of some repair.

The current trophy was donated for use starting in 1996 and has the following inscription: "Donated by the Iroquois Lacrosse Association and the '95 Presidents Cup winners, the Akwesasne Thunder, in honour and memory of the late Frank 'Tewisateni' Roundpoint, "Grandfather of Lacrosse", Akwesasne Mohawk Nation."

The first two years (1964-1965) of competition were essentially the result of provincial championship play in Ontario. The Hagerville Warriors won the Ontario Senior ‘B’ Championship in 1964 – however at some point they were later included in the list of Canadian national champions for Senior ‘B’ as the Ohsweken Warriors even though 1965 was reported in the newspaper press at that time as the first year of a National Senior ‘B’ Championship in Canada. The following year the Fergus Thistles won the Ontario Senior ‘B’ Championship. Port Alberni Labatts won the British Columbia Senior ‘B’ Championship and arrangements were made for a National Championship series to be played – however it never took place.

1965 saw the first true national competition between teams from different provinces when the Nanaimo Luckies and defending Fergus Thistles met in Nanaimo, British Columbia in a best of five series, which was swept 3-0 by Nanaimo and required a replay of the final 7 minutes and 15 seconds of the second game of the series after Fergus Thistles protested an officiating call.

== Competing Leagues ==
- Can-Am Senior B Lacrosse League (Can-Am)
- Ontario Series Lacrosse (OSL)
- Prairie Gold Lacrosse League (PGLL)
- Nova Scotia Senior Lacrosse League (NSSLL)
- Rocky Mountain Lacrosse League (RMLL)
- Three Nations Senior Lacrosse League (TNSLL)
- West Coast Senior Lacrosse Association (WCSLA)

== Medal history ==
| Year | | | | Location |
|---|---|---|---|---|
| 1989 | Owen Sound North Stars (Ont) | Nanaimo Timbermen (WCSLA) | Edmonton Miners (RMLL) | Nanaimo, BC |
| 1988 | Fergus Thistles (Ont) | Surrey Rebels (WCSLA) | Newtown Golden Eagles (Can-Am) | Halifax, NS |
| 1987 | Fergus Thistles (Ont) | Sarnia Lumley Wrecking (Ont) | Newtown Golden Eagles (Can-Am) | Sarnia, ON |
| 1986 | Fergus Thistles (Ont) | Newtown Golden Eagles (Can-Am) | Surrey Rebels (WCSLA) | Surrey, BC |
| 1985 | North Shore Indians (WCSLA) | Orangeville Northmen (Ont) | Newtown Golden Eagles (Can-Am) | Ladner, BC |
| 1984 | Orangeville Northmen (Ont) | Kitchener-Waterloo Kodiaks | Calgary Mountaineers | Kitchener-Waterloo, Ontario |
| 1983 | Calgary Mountaineers (Alberta) | Newtown Golden Eagles (Can-Am) | -- | Valleyfield, QC |
| 1982 | Orangeville Northmen (Ont) | Ohsweken Warriors | Nanaimo City | Sarnia, Ontario |
| 1981 | Orangeville Northmen (Ont) | Calgary | North Shore Indians | Cornwall, Ontario |
| 1980 | Owen Sound North Stars (Ont) | Orangeville Dufferin Northmen | North Shore Indians | Owen Sound, Ontario |
| 1979 | Owen Sound North Stars (Ont) | Kahnawake Mohawks (ILA) | -- | Cornwall, Ontario & Massena, New York |
| 1978 | Vernon Tigers (Okanagan) | Sherwood Park Capitals | - | Vernon, British Columbia |
| 1977 | Vernon Tigers (Okanagan) | Six Nations Braves | Akwesasne Warriors | Edmonton, Alberta |
| 1976 | Vernon Tigers (Okanagan) | Edmonton Fullers (Alberta) | Manitoba All-Stars | Winnipeg, Manitoba |
| 1975 | Edmonton Fullers (Alberta) | Nova Scotia Olands | Prince George Canada Hotel (NCLA) | Verdun/Magog, QC |
| 1974 | Prince George Oldstylers (NCLA) | Winnipeg All-Stars (Alberta) | New Westminster Rebels (NCLA) | New Westminster, BC |
| 1973 | Windsor Warlocks (Ont) | Prince George Oldstylers (NCLA) | Halifax PCO’s | Halifax, NS |
| 1972 | Brampton Excelsiors (Ont ) | New Westminster Labatt Blues (BC) | none | Brampton, ON |
| 1971 | Windsor Warlocks (Ont) | Burnaby Kokanees (BC) | none | Windsor, ON |
| 1970 | Windsor Clippers (Ont) | New Westminster Blues (BC) | none | Windsor, ON |
| 1969 | Nanaimo Luckies (BC) | Caughnawaga Indians | none | Montréal, QC |
| 1968 | Brantford Warriors (Ont) | Nanaimo Luckies | none | Brantford, ON |
| 1967 | Brantford Warriors (Ont) | Nanaimo Luckies | none | Brantford, ON |
| 1966 | Nanaimo Luckies (BC) | Fergus Thistles (Ont) | none | Nanaimo, BC |
| 1965 | Fergus Thistles (Ont) | Cornwall Wildcats | none | Cornwall, ON |
| 1964 | Ohsweken Warriors (Ont) | -- | -- | |

| Year | Gold Medal Game | | | Bronze Medal Game | | |
| Year | Champions | Score | Finalists | Third Place | Score | Fourth Place |
|---|---|---|---|---|---|---|
| 1990; Fergus, ON | Fergus Thistles; MSL - Host | 8-5 | Edmonton Miners; RMLL | Owen Sound North Stars; MSL | 11-5 | Ladner Pioneers; WCSLA |
| 1991 | Owen Sound North Stars; MSL | 9-3 | Edmonton Miners; RMLL | Ohsweken Warriors; Can-Am | 16-15 | Calgary Mountaineers; RMLL |
| 1992 | Fergus Thistles; MSL | | Nanaimo Timbermen; WCSLA | Edmonton Miners; RMLL | | |
| 1993 | North Shore Indians; WCSLA | | Edmonton Miners; RMLL | Burnaby Lakers; WCSLA | | |
| 1994; Hamilton, ON | Tuscarora Thunderhawks; ILA | | Burnaby Lakers; WCSLA | Akwesasne Thunder; ILA | | |
| 1995; Prince George, BC | Akwesasne Thunder; ILA | | Burnaby Lakers; WCSLA | Edmonton Miners; RMLL | | |
| 1996; Cornwall, ON | Ohsweken Wolves; Can-Am | | Akwesasne Thunder; ILA - Host | Kahnawake Mohawks; ILA | | |
| 1997; Ladner, BC | Akwesasne Thunder; ILA | | Ohsweken Wolves; Can-Am | Ladner Pioneers; WCSLA - Host | | |
| 1998; Tuscarora, NY | Ladner Pioneers; WCSLA | | Newtown Golden Eagles; Can-Am | Tuscarora Thunderhawks; Can-Am - Host | | |
| 1999; Burnaby, BC | Burnaby Bandits; WCSLA - Host | 9-5 | North Shore Indians; WCSLA | Edmonton Outlaws; RMLL | 15-14 | Newtown Golden Eagles; Can-Am |
| 2000; Kahnawake, QC | Newtown Golden Eagles; Can-Am | 13-6 | Brooklin Merchants; OSBLL | Kahnawake Mohawks; QSLL - Host | 11-7 | Langley Knights; WCSLA |
| 2001; New Westminster, BC | North Shore Indians; WCSLA - Host | 6-3 | Abbotsford Bandits; WCSLA | Owen Sound Woodsmen; OSBLL | 17-13 | Snye Warriors; TNSLL |
| 2002; Edmonton, AB | Edmonton Outlaws; RMLL - Host | 12-4 | Snye Warriors; TNSLL | Nanaimo Timbermen; WCSLA | 12-6 | Newtown Golden Eagles; Can-Am |
| 2003; Owen Sound, ON | Kitchener-Waterloo Kodiaks; OSBLL | 7-6 | Owen Sound Woodsmen; OSBLL - Host | Edmonton Outlaws; RMLL | 7-5 | Nanaimo Timbermen; WCSLA |
| 2004; Langley, BC | Ladner Pioneers; WCSLA | 6-3 | Kahnawake Mohawks; QSLL | Langley Knights; WCSLA - Host | 7-0 | Barrie Lakeshores; OSBLL |
| 2005; Waterloo, ON | Kitchener-Waterloo Kodiaks; OSBLL - Host | 5-3 | Tri-City Bandits; WCSLA | Sherwood Park Outlaws; RMLL | 7-4 | Kahnawake Mohawks; QSLL |
| 2006; Ladner, BC | Wellington Aces; OSBLL | 9-5 | Sherwood Park Outlaws; RMLL | Ladner Pioneers; WCSLA - Host | 12-6 | Tri-City Bandits; WCSLA |
| 2007; Owen Sound, ON | Sherwood Park Outlaws; RMLL | 8-6 | Ajax-Pickering Rock; OSBLL | Owen Sound Woodsmen; OSBLL - Host | 9-6 | Ladner Pioneers; WCSLA |
| 2008; Sherwood Park, AB | Owen Sound Woodsmen; OSBLL | 10-5 | Sherwood Park Outlaws; RMLL - Host | Kahnawake Mohawks; QSLL | 9-4 | Tri-City Bandits; WCSLA |
| 2009; Hagersville, ON | Owen Sound Woodsmen; OSBLL | 11-5 | Tri-City Bandits; WCSLA | Six Nations Sting; Can-Am - Host | 8-7 | Niagara Hawks; Can-Am |
| 2010; Burnaby, BC | Onondaga Redhawks; Can-Am | 14-7 | Owen Sound Woodsmen; OSBLL | Kahnawake Mohawks; QSLL | 13-8 | Burnaby Burrards; WCSLA - Host |
| 2011; Akwesasne | St. Regis Braves; TNSLL | 11-8 | Snake Island Muskies; TNSLL - Host | St. Catharines Saints; OSBLL | 13-8 | Kahnawake Mohawks; QSLL |
| 2012; Spruce Grove, AB | St. Regis Braves; TNSLL | 13-9 | St. Catharines Saints; OSBLL | Rocky View Knights; RMLL | 9-8 OT | Spruce Grove Slash; RMLL - Host |
| 2013; Kahnawake, QC | St. Catharines Saints; OSBLL | 8-5 | Kahnawake Mohawks; QSLL - Host | Caughnawaga Indians; TNSLL | 14-9 | Calgary Mountaineers; RMLL |
| 2014; Coquitlam, BC | Onondaga Redhawks; Can-Am | 9-7 | Six Nations Rivermen; OSBLL | St. Albert Miners; RMLL | 7-5 | Kahnawake Mohawks; QSLL |
| 2015; St. Catharines, ON | Six Nations Rivermen; OSBLL | 14-11 | Capital Region Axemen; QSLL | St. Catharines Saints; OSBLL - Host | 10-7 | Onondaga Redhawks; Can-Am |
| 2016; Leduc, AB | St. Albert Miners; RMLL | 12-7 | Kahnawake Mohawks; QSLL | Brooklin Merchants; OSBLL | 13-10 | Native Sons; Can-Am |
| 2017; Hagersville, ON | St. Albert Miners; RMLL | 7-6 | Six Nations Rivermen; OSBLL - Host | Native Sons; Can-Am | 10-5 | St. Regis Braves; TNSLL |
| 2018; Nanaimo, BC | St. Albert Miners; RMLL | 10-8 OT | Nanaimo Timbermen; WCSLA - Host | Caghnawaga Indians; TNSLL | 15-6 | Oakville Titans; OSBLL |
| 2019; Kahnawake, QC | Six Nations Rivermen; OSL | 9-5 | Akwesasne Bucks; Can-Am | Kahnawake Mohawks; QSLL - Host | 12-6 | St. Albert Miners; RMLL |
| 2022; Edmonton, AB | Ladner Pioneers; WCSLA | 8-6 | Akwesasne Bucks; Can-Am | Six Nations Rivermen; OSL | 12-8 | St. Albert Miners; RMLL - Host |
| 2023 Oakville, ON | Ladner Pioneers; WCSLA | 12-8 | Edmonton Miners; RMLL | Oakville Rock; OSL- Host | 18-9 | Snake Island Muskies; TNSLL |
| 2024 Ladner, BC | Ladner Pioneers; WCSLA - Host | 9-2 | Edmonton Miners; RMLL | Allegany Arrows; Can-Am | 11-8 | Snake Island Muskies; TNSLL |
| 2025 Whitby, ON | Snake Island Muskies; TNSLL | 11-5 | Brooklin Merchants; OSL - Host | Edmonton Miners; RMLL | 12-2 | Six Nations Rivermen; OSL |
| 2026 Edmonton, AB | Edmonton Miners; RMLL - Host | 12-4 | Snake Island Muskies; TNSLL | Ladner Pioneers; WCSLA | 17-6 | Newtown Golden Eagles; Can-Am |

== Most Valuable Player award ==
| 1990 | Emmett Printup | Fergus Thistles |
| 1986 | Dwayne Ferguson | Calgary Mountaineers |
1987
| 1988 | Jeff Gill | Newtown Golden Eagles |
| 1990 | Emmett Printup | Fergus Thistles |
| 1994 | Emmett Printup | Tuscarora Thunder |
| 1995 | Dean Cecconi | Akwesasne Thunder |
1996
| 1997 | Andy Holland | Burnaby Lakers |
| 1998 | | |
| 1999 | Andy Holland | Burnaby Lakers |
| 2000 | | |
| 2001 | Jamie Grimoldby | Owen Sound Woodsmen |
| 2002 | Grant McLeod | Edmonton Outlaws |
| 2003 | Pat McCready | Kitchener-Waterloo Kodiaks |
| 2004 | Rob Cook | Ladner Pioneers |
| 2005 | Kyle Arbuckle | Kitchener-Waterloo Kodiaks |
| 2006 | Jamie Rooney | Wellington Aces |
| 2007 | Jim Veltman | Ajax-Pickering Rock |
| 2008 | Callum Crawford | Kahnawake Mohawks |
| 2009 | Findlay Wilson | Niagara Hawks |
| 2010 | Jeremy Thompson | Onondaga Redhawks |
| 2011 | Josh Sanderson | Snake Island Muskies |
| 2012 | Jerome Thompson | St. Regis Braves |
| 2013 | Jake Henhawk | St. Catharines Saints |
| 2014 | Lyle Thompson | Onondaga Redhawks |
| 2015 | Roger Vyse | Six Nations Rivermen |
| 2016 | Keegan Bal | St. Albert Miners |
| 2017 | Keegan Bal | St. Albert Miners |
| 2018 | Aaron Bold | St. Albert Miners |
| 2019 | Warren Hill | Six Nations Rivermen |
| 2022 | Alex Buque | Ladner Pioneers |
| 2023 | Austin Shanks | Ladner Pioneers |
| 2024 | Christian Del Bianco | Ladner Pioneers |
| 2025 | Nick Damude | Snake Island Muskies |

== Leading scorer ==
| Year | Player | Team | G-A-P |
|---|---|---|---|
| 1988 | Bob Hamley | Fergus Thistles | 18-13-31 |
| 1997 | Kyle Goundrey | Ladner Pioneers | 10-9-19 |
| 1998 | Chris Stachniak | Edmonton Miners | 10-11-21 |
| 1999 | Jim Nishiyams | Burnaby Bandits | 6-12-18 |
| 2000 | Mike Stevens | Newton Golden Eagles | 9-12-21 |
| 2001 | Al Truant | North Shore Indians | 11-8-19 |
| 2002 | Jamie Bowen | Edmonton Outlaws | 6-8-14 |
| 2003 | Colin Sherbanuk | Edmonton Outlaws | 6-7-13 |
| 2004 | Mike Stevens | Newton Golden Eagles | 7-15-22 |
| 2005 | Kyle Arbuckle | Kitchener-Waterloo Kodiaks | 7-11-18 |
| 2006 | Jamie Rooney | Wellington Aces | 10-10-20 |
| 2007 | Jeff Pringle | Ladner Pioneers | 12-7-19 |
| 2008 | Chad Culp | Owen Sound Woodsmen | 10-8-18 |
| 2009 | Bryan Kazarian | Owen Sound Woodsmen | 12-24-36 |
| 2010 | Luke Wiles | Kahnawake Mohawks | 13-23-36 |
| 2011 | Josh Sanderson | Snake Island Muskies | 17-27-44 |
| 2012 | Jerome Thompson | St. Regis Braves | 15-24-39 |
| 2013 | Chris Attwood | St. Catharines Saints | 21-24-45 |
| 2014 | Lyle Thompson | Onondaga Redhawks | 17-23-40 |
| 2015 | Wayne VanEvery | Six Nations Rivermen | 15-16-31 |
| 2016 | Keegan Bal | St.Albert Miners | 12-24-36 |
| 2017 | Keegan Bal | St.Albert Miners | 30-32-62 |
| 2018 | Keegan Bal | St.Albert Miners | 16-27-43 |
| 2019 | Graedon Cornfield Seth Oakes | St.Albert Miners Akwesasne Bucks | 20-19-39 18-21-39 |
| 2022 | Keegan Bal | Miners Lacrosse Club | 18-37-55 |
| 2023 | Ryan Lanchbury | Oakville Rock | 11-30-41 |
| 2024 | Tyler Pace | Ladner Pioneers | 10-26-36 |
| 2025 | Ryan Lanchbury | Snake Island Muskies | 15-17-32 |
| 2026 | Brayden Mayea | Edmonton Miners | 17-21-38 |

== All-Star teams ==
=== First Team All-Stars ===
| Year | Goaltender | Runners | |
|---|---|---|---|
| 1986 | Jimmy Watkins (Fergus) | Dwayne Ferguson (Calgary), Barry Rooymans (Fergus), Jeff Gill (Newtown), Glen Lay (Newtown), Mark Tuura (Surrey) | |
| 1987 | Jimmy Watkins (Fergus) | Greg Hummel (Fergus), Bob McGinn (Fergus) | |
| Year | Goaltender | Defence | Forwards |
| 1988 | Rick Peters (Nova Scotia) | Steve Pinchin (Fergus), Tim Kelly (Surrey) | Bob Hamley (Fergus), Jeff Gill (Newtown), Jim Aitchison (Surrey) |
| Year | Goaltender | Runners | |
| 1995 | Jamie Scott (Burnaby) | Dean Cecconi (Akwesasne), Mike Benedict, Jnr. (Akwesasne), Greg Davidson (Burnaby), Don Johannson (Burnaby), Kelly Young (Hagersville) | |
| 1996 | | | |
| 1997 | Tom Valade (Burnaby) | Charlie Lockwood (Akwesasne), Darren Wilson (Ohsweken), Kyle Goundrey (Ladner), John Wilson (Burnaby), Scott Hill (Ohsweken) | |
| 1998 | | Chris Stachniak (Edmonton), Kyle Goundrey (Ladner), | |
| 1999 | Chris Levis (North Shore) | Andy Holland (Burnaby), Gewas Schindler (Kahnawake), Dan Bostrom (Edmonton), Jim Nishiyama (Burnaby), Frank Bolton (North Shore) | |
| 2000 | | | |
| 2001 | Joe Bell Jr.* (Abbostford)/ Rob Cook* (Abbotsford) | Jamie Grimoldby (Owen Sound), Mike Benedict Jr. (Snye), George Baker (North Shore), Al Truant (North Shore), Russ Heard (Abbotsford) | |
| 2002 | Mike Thompson (Snye) | Mike Benedict Jr. (Snye), Sean Hayes (Nanaimo), Jamie Bowen (Edmonton), Bill Brennan (Newton), Jamie Grimoldby (Owen Sound) | |
| 2003 | Rob Blasdell (Owen Sound) | Lindsay Plunkett (Owen Sound), Pat McCready (K-W), Colin Sherbanuk (Edmonton), Kevin Shires (Nanaimo), Kevin Biggs (Kahnawake) | |
| 2004 | Rob Blasdell (Barrie) | Chris Konopilliff (Kahnawake), Luke Wiles (Barrie), Ted Downling (Ladner), Greg Rennie (Ladner), Al Truant (Langley) | |
| 2005 | Steve Dietrich (K-W) | Jordan Hernandez (Tri-City), Louie Alfred (Kahnawake), David Brown (K-W), Kevin Howard (Sherwood Park), Wayne Burke (K-W) | |
| 2006 | Rob Cook (Ladner) | Jamie Rooney (Wellington), Shaun McRae (Tri-City), Ryan McNish (Sherwood Park), Scott Anderson (Ladner), Gewas Schindler (Onondaga) | |
| 2007 | Grant McLeod (Sherwood Park) | Brandon Sanderson (Owen Sound), Jeff Pringle (Ladner), Bryan Kazarian (Owen Sound), Jim Veltman (Ajax-Pickering), Chad Norton (LaSalle) | |
| Year | Goaltender | Defence | Forwards |
| 2008 | Ben VanEvery (Kahnawake) | Lance Mitchell (Kahnawake), Jarrett Dorman (Tri-City) | Ben Prepchuk (Sherwood Park), Peter Gut (Sherwood Park), Chris Driscoll (Owen Sound) |
| 2009 | Matt Soulliere (Tri-City) | Logan Kane (Kahnawake), Joe Hall (Massena) | Tyler Farmer (Okotoks), Kyle Smith (Six Nations), Charlie Girdler (Tri-City) |
| 2010 | Rob Cook (Burnaby) | J. R. Bucktooth (Onondaga), Adam Jackson (Owen Sound) | Luke Wiles (Kahnawake), Matt Quinton (Owen Sound), Jeremy Thompson (Onondaga) |
| 2011 | Jake Henhawk (St. Catharines) | Pat McCreedy (St. Catharines), Daryl Seymour (St. Regis) | Josh Sanderson (Snake Island), Brett Bucktooth (St. Regis), Geoff McNulty (St. Catharines) |
| 2012 | Alex Fortier (St. Regis) | Jerome Thompson (St. Regis), Jamie Shewchuk (St. Regis) | Andre Potter (St. Catharines), Dylan Llord (St. Catharines), Miles Thompson (St. Regis) |
| 2013 | Mike Thompson (Kahnawake) | Chris Attwood (St. Catharines), Caleb Wiles (Kahnawake) | Terry Melnyk (Calgary), Tim Bergin (Capital District), Miles Thompson (St. Regis) |
| 2014 | Warren Hill (Six Nations) | Jeremy Thompson (Onondaga), John Lintz (St. Albert) | Lyle Thompson (Onondaga), Nate Schmidt (St. Albert), Caleb Wiles (Kahnawake) |
| 2024 | Christian Del Bianco (Ladner) | Brett Craig (Edmonton), Matt Acchione (Snake Island) | Chris Cloutier (Allegany), Chris Boushy (Snake Island), Tyler Pace (Ladner) |
| 2025 | Nick Damude (Snake Island) | Alex Marinier (Brooklin) | David Anderson (Six Nations), Will MacLeod (Brooklin), Chase Fraser (Allegany), Joey Spallina (Snake Island) |

(*) denotes a tie in selection.

=== Second Team All-Stars ===
| Year | Goaltender | Runners | |
|---|---|---|---|
| 1986 | | Rick Sawicki (Fergus) | |
| 1987 | | Bob Hamley (Fergus) | |
| Year | Goaltender | Defence | Forwards |
| 1988 | Jimmy Watkins (Fergus) | Dan Armstrong (Fergus), Darwin John (Newtown) | Emmett Printup (Newtown), Wayne Finck (Nova Scotia), Shaun Springett (Surrey) |
| Year | Goaltender | Runners | |
| 1995 | Neil Bombury (Akwesasne) | Jason Kirby (Prince George), Todd Thomas (Hagersville), Jon Schneider (Edmonton), Marwan Jomha (Edmonton), Mark Burnham (Akwesasne) | |
| 1996 | | | |
| 1997 | Rob Cook (Ladner) | Marwan Jomha (Edmonton), Tom Sohier (Ladner), Travis Hill (Ohsweken), Mark Burnam (Akwesasne), Greg Phillips (Akwesasne) | |
| 1998 | | | |
| 1999 | John Frame (Edmonton) | Mike Kettles (Burnaby), Jamie Bowen (Edmonton), Brandon Seneca (Newton), Kono Douglas (Newton), Bobby Delarone (Kahnawake) | |
| 2000 | | | |
| 2001 | Tom Valade (North Shore) | Devan Wray (Edmonton), Jamie Bowen (Edmonton), Chris Gill (North Shore), Mike Stevens (Newton), Craig Ainsworth (Owen Sound) | |
| 2002 | Grant McLeod (Edmonton) | Vern Hill (Newton), Jon Tarbell (Snye), Tyler Heavenor (Nanaimo), Lindsay Plunkett (Owen Sound), Scott Thompson (Snye) | |
| 2003 | Devon Dalep (Nanaimo) | Louie Alfred (Kahnawake), Jamie Roy (Nanaimo), Andy Dudun (K-W), Mike Stevens (Newton), Bryan Kazarian* (Owen Sound), Kyle Arbuckle* (K-W) | |
| 2004 | Rob Cook (Ladner) | Jason Jankowski (Barrie), Lance Mitchell (Kahnawake), Sean Hayes (Langley), John Harding (Winnipeg), Louie Alfred (Kahnawake) | |
| 2005 | Derek Collins (Kahnawake) | Gewas Schindler (Onondaga), Kevin Hobday (Sherwood Park), Vern Hill (Mohawk), Russ Heard (Tri-City), Brett Bucktooth (Onondaga) | |
| 2006 | Jeff Powless (Onondaga) | Kasey Beirnes (Wellington), Kyle Goundry (Ladner), Bruce Codd (Wellington), Russ Heard (Tri-City), Dave McCrimmon (Sherwood Park) | |
| 2007 | Steve Dietrich (Ajax-Pickering) | Jimmy Quinlan (Sherwood Park), Mike Benedict Jr. (LaSalle), Shawn Summerfield (Ajax-Pickering), Ben Green (LaSalle), Darcy Powless (Six Nations) | |
| Year | Goaltender | Defence | Forwards |
| 2008 | Josh McNaughton (Owen Sound) | Dan Bostrom (Sherwood Park), Rob McGowean (Airdrie) | D. J. Serr (Kahnawake), Tony Walker (Six Nations), Chad Culp (Owen Sound) |
| 2009 | Jake Henhawk (Six Nations) | Callum Crawford (Kahnawake), Jim Barnes (Massena) | Chris Janese (Niagara), Brandon Sanderson (Owen Sound), Justin Thomas (Tri-City) |
| 2010 | Ross Bucktooth (Onondaga) | Andy Spack (Onondaga), Shane Lopatynicki (St. Albert) | Jamie Grimoldby (Owen Sound), Athan Iannucci (Tri-City), Jamie Rooney (Kahnawake) |
| 2011 | Alex Coutts (St. Albert) | Kasey Beirnes (Kahnawake), Ryan Oakes (Snake Island) | Callum Crawford (Kahnawake), Tom Seeman (Tri-City), Peter Jacobs (St. Regis) |
| 2012 | Jake Henhawk (St. Catharines) | Dean Hill (St. Regis), Mark Schermann (Rockyview) | Ryan McNish (Spruce Grove), Derek Tom (Rockyview), Murray Porter (St. Catharines) |
| 2013 | Jake Henhawk (St. Catharines) | Miles Thompson (Caughnawaga), Russell Thomas (Nanaimo) | Mike Klotz (Calgary), Callum Crawford (Kahnawake), Seth Oakes (Caughnawaga) |
| 2014 | David Marrese (St. Albert) | Richard Cambrey (Tri-City), Jordan Cornfield (St. Albert) | Steve Higgs (Nanaimo), Peter Jacobs (Kahnawake), Wayne VanEvery (Six Nations) |
| 2024 | Cam MacLeod (Edmonton) | John Lintz (Edmonton), Nathan Henare (Ladner) | Greg Elijah-Brown (Six Nations), Chris Attwood (Allegany), Spencer Bromley (Ladner) |
| 2025 | Deacan Knott (Brooklin) | Jarrett Toll (Edmonton) | Dean Fairall (Edmonton), Keegan Bell (Ladner), Ryan Lanchbury (Snake Island), Alexander De La Ronde (Winnipeg) |

(*) denotes a tie in selection.
