= Cornwall Celtics =

Canadian lacrosse team

Cornwall Celtics
City	Cornwall, Ontario
League	OLA Junior B Lacrosse League
Founded	2006
Home Arena	Si Miller Arena
Colours	Green, Black, and White
Coach	Shawn Lauzon
GM

The Cornwall Celtics are Junior "B" box lacrosse team from Cornwall, Ontario, Canada. The Celtics play in the OLA Junior B Lacrosse League.

== History ==
The Cornwall Celtics joined the OLA-B in 2006 with the Hamilton Bengals. These two teams are a part of the expansion of the OLA-B in recent years. Their first game was a 15–7 loss to the Gloucester Griffins on April 22, 2006. On May 6, 2006, the Celtics picked up their first win against the Milton Mavericks, 6–5. The Celtics did not make the playoffs in their first season.

Cornwall is better known as a hockey town, with the (now gone) Cornwall Royals and the Central Junior A Hockey League's Cornwall Colts, but the ownership group of the Celtics feel that they will be able to bring Lacrosse back to the forefront of Cornwall's sports community .

== Season-by-season results ==
Note: GP = Games played, W = Wins, L = Losses, T = Ties, Pts = Points, GF = Goals for, GA = Goals against

Season	GP	W	L	T	GF	GA	PTS	Placing	Playoffs
1969	18	13	4	1	280	192	27	1st OLA-B East	Lost Round 1
1970	24	19	5	0	427	279	38	1st OLA-B East	Won Ontario
1971	24	19	5	0	500	253	38	2nd OLA-B East	Lost Castrol Cup Playoffs
1972	20	19	1	0	509	180	38	1st OLA-B East	Lost Ontario Finals
2006	20	4	16	0	101	241	8	11th OLA-B East	DNQ
2007	20	7	13	0	129	189	14	8th OLA-B East	Lost Round 1
2008	20	7	13	0	134	207	14	9th OLA-B East	DNQ
2009	20	11	8	1	149	146	23	6th OLA-B East	Lost 1st Round
