= Owen Sound North Stars =

- City: Owen Sound, Ontario
- League: Major Series Lacrosse; OLA Senior B Lacrosse League
- Operated: 1967-1995
- Home arena: Owen Sound Centennial Arena
- Colours: Orange, Black, and White

The Owen Sound North Stars were a Canadian Senior box lacrosse team. The team played in Owen Sound, Ontario, Canada and participated in the Major Series Lacrosse and the OLA Senior B Lacrosse League. The North Stars were four-time Presidents Cup National Champions.

The team went out of business after the 1995 season.

== See also ==
- Major Series Lacrosse
- OLA Senior B Lacrosse League
- Presidents Cup (box lacrosse)
