= Justin Martin =

Justin Martin may refer to:

- Justin Martin (actor), played Donny Dion in High School Musical
- Justin Martin (animator), art director of 2024 film Big City Greens the Movie: Spacecation
- Justin Martin (director), Australian theatre director
- Justin Martin (DJ), American DJ and record producer
- Justin Martin (lacrosse), Canadian professional lacrosse player

== See also ==
- Justyn Martin, American football player
