= Nova Scotia Senior Lacrosse League =

- Sport: Box lacrosse
- Founded: 2001
- No. of teams: 4
- Most recent champion: Fighting Orangutans (2019)
- Most titles: Halifax Colby Pool Sharks (4)
- Website: http://nssll.ca

The Nova Scotia Senior Lacrosse League (NSSLL) is a Senior B box lacrosse league based in Nova Scotia. NSSLL is sanctioned by Lacrosse Nova Scotia.

League members or provincial all-star teams have on occasion advanced to compete in Presidents Cup, the national championship of Senior B box lacrosse in Canada.

== History ==
First formed in 2001 as the Maritime Senior Mens Lacrosse League, five teams competed in the inaugural season. Original members included Sackville Fighting Orangutans, Dartmouth Bandits, Fredericton Raging Saints, Sackville Wolves and Saint John Storm. Bedford Crossefire(Juniors) were added for the 2002 season giving the all-time high of six teams. After five seasons the league dissolved due to decreasing player numbers.

The league was revived for the 2011 season with four teams. In 2014 the league was renamed Nova Scotia Senior Lacrosse League.

Graduating junior players from the East Coast Junior Lacrosse League (ECJLL) are drafted into the NSSLL via a draft each spring.

=== Presidents' Cup history ===
Nova Scotia was first represented at the 1973 Presidents' Cup tournament, hosting the five-team championship. Team Nova Scotia went 2-2 in round robin play, just missing a spot in the gold medal game. The first medal for Nova Scotia came in the 1975 Presidents Cup, capturing the silver medal after losing to the Edmonton Fullers in the championship.

Halifax Olands made two appearances at the national championship in 1976 (0-4) and again in 1978. A 2-3 round robin record in '78 earned Halifax a spot in the bronze medal game, where they lost to the Akwesasne Warriors 14-13.

In 1985 Nova Scotia Schooners represented the province in Ladner, British Columbia, failing to medal.

1988 was the most recent season that Halifax hosted the four-team tournament. Team Nova Scotia last appeared in 1990.

After a 25-year absence at Presidents Cup, Team Nova Scotia returned to competition at the 2015 tournament in St. Catharines. The Nova Scotia Privateers All-Stars went on to capture 7th Place at the event, defeating Nanaimo Timbermen 15-12.

== Teams ==
Team	City/Area	Joined	Notes
Fighting Orangutans	Halifax, Nova Scotia	2001	Named Halifax Privateers from 2011-2014
Colby Pool Sharks	Halifax, Nova Scotia	2011	Originally named Jolly Rogers (2011), Pogue Fado Shamrocks (2012-2014)
Hustle Lacrosse Club	Halifax, Nova Scotia	2011	Originally named Maritimes LC (2011)
Twin City Arrows	Halifax, Nova Scotia	2011	

=== Former teams ===
- Dartmouth Bandits (2002-2004)
- Fredericton Raging Saints (1999-2004)
- Fredericton Highlanders (1996-2002)
- Bedford Crossefire (Jr) (2002)
- Privateers (2011-2014) - formed in 2008 as Adanac Warriors
- Sackville Wolves (2002-2004)
- Saint John Storm (2002-2005)

== League champions ==
Year	Winner	Finalist	Results
2001	Sackville Wolves	Fredericton Raging Saints	12-10 (OT)
2002	Fredericton Raging Saints	Bedford Fighting Orangutans	7-4
2003	Fredericton Raging Saints	Bedford Fighting Orangutans	10-5
2004	Fredericton Raging Saints	Dartmouth Bandits	12-11
2011	Twin City Arrows	Halifax Privateers	
2012	Halifax Privateers	Pogue Fado Shamrocks	17-6
2013	Pogue Fado Shamrocks	Halifax Privateers	
2014	Twin City Arrows	Pogue Fado Shamrocks	6-5 (OT)
2015	Hustle Lacrosse Club	Colby Pool Sharks	9-1; 7-5
2016	Colby Pool Sharks	Twin City Arrows	10-7; 12-8
2017	Colby Pool Sharks	Twin City Arrows	?, 7-5
2018	Colby Pool Sharks	Fighting Orangutans	11-8; 15-12
2019	Fighting Orangutans	Colby Pool Sharks	9-8; 10-11; 8-4
