= St. Catharines Saints (2011–2015) =

- Founded: 2011
- Disbanded: 2015
- League: OLA Senior B Lacrosse League
- Based in: St. Catharines, Ontario
- Arena: Jack Gatecliff Arena
- Colours: Green, Black, and White

The St. Catharines Saints were a Canadian Senior box lacrosse team. From 2011 to 2015, the team played in the City of St. Catharines, Ontario, Canada and participated in the OLA Senior B Lacrosse League. They were the 2013 Presidents Cup National Champions and three-time Ontario Lacrosse Association Senior B Champions.

== History ==
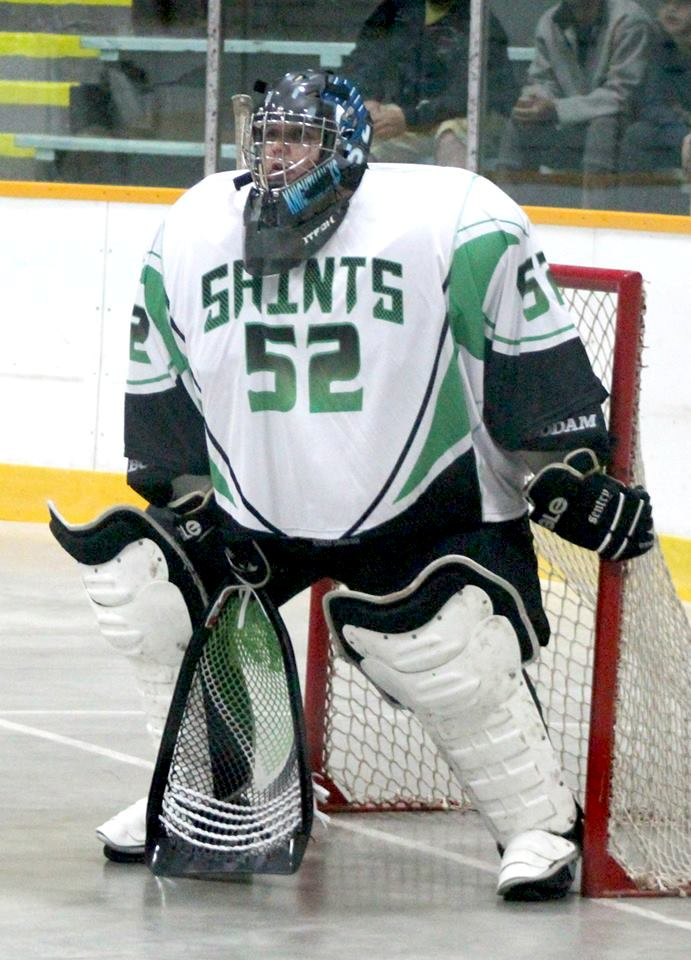
Saints goalie Grant Crawley in 2015.

In 2013, the Saints won their third consecutive league title in only their third season of existence. The Saints travelled to Kahnawake to compete for the national championship. They would finish first place in the round robin with 5 wins and one loss, beating Calgary, Onondaga, Capital Region, and Caughnawaga before losing to Kahnawake in the final round robin game. St. Kitts beat Calgary 10–8 in the semi-final and avenged their loss to Kahnawake with an 8–5 win to take the Presidents Cup as Canadian Senior B champions. National Lacrosse League goalie Jake Henhawk and Chris Attwood were named to the tournament's all-star teams, while Henhawk was named the tournament's most valuable player.

The Saints hosted the 2015 Presidents Cup.

== Season-by-season results ==
Season	GP	W	L	T	GF	GA	P	Results	Playoffs
2011	16	5	11	0	186	140	10	4th OSBLL	Won League
2012	16	11	5	0	205	152	22	1st OSBLL	Won League
2013	16	13	3	0	174	112	26	1st OSBLL	Won League, won Presidents Cup
2014	16	13	3	0	187	137	26	2nd OSBLL	Lost semi-final
2015	16	11	4	1	150	124	23	2nd OSBLL	Lost semi-final

== Presidents Cup results ==
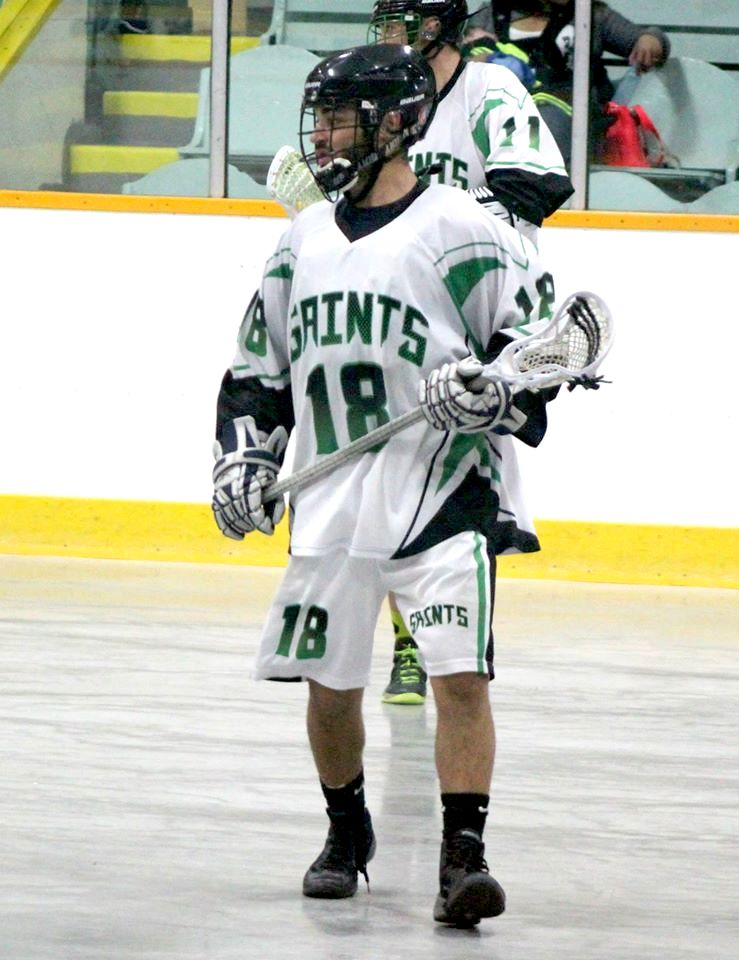
Saints player Dustin Gatt in 2015

Season	Location	GP	W	L	T	GF	GA	Result
2011	Akwesasne, ON	7	4	2	1	64	54	Won Bronze
2012	Spruce Grove, AB	7	5	2	0	72	52	Won Silver
2013	Kahnawake, QC	8	7	1	0	82	46	Won Gold
2015	St. Catharines, ON							Won Bronze

== See also ==
- OLA Senior B Lacrosse League
- Presidents Cup (box lacrosse)
