= Brooklin Merchants =

Lacrosse team

- Sport: Box lacrosse
- Founded: 2000; 26 years ago
- League: Ontario Series Lacrosse
- Division: Eastern
- Based in: Brooklin, Ontario
- Arena: Iroquois Park Sports Centre
- Colours: blue, white, orange
- Head coach: Ryan Degerdon
- General manager: Will Petschenig
- Captain: Parker Pipher
- Championships: 0 Presidents Cup (box lacrosse)
- Division titles: OSL Championships: (3) 2000, 2016, 2025
- Affiliated teams: Brooklin Lacrosse Club (Major SeriesLacrosse); Clarington Green Gaels (OLA Jr. B)Lakefeild Rage (senior Series Lacrosse)
- Website: www.brooklinmerchants.com

The Brooklin Merchants is a box lacrosse team from Brooklin, Ontario. The Merchants play in the Ontario Series Lacrosse (OSL) league (formerly known as Senior "B"). The OSL is the counterpart of the Quebec Senior Lacrosse League, Rocky Mountain Lacrosse League, West Coast Senior Lacrosse Association & Three Nations Senior Lacrosse League

== Championships ==
Presidents Cup Canadian Champions (0)

Ontario Series Lacrosse Champions (3)

- 2000
- 2015
- 2025

== Season-by-season results ==
Season	GP	W	L	T	PTS	GF	GA	Finish	Playoffs
2000	8	7	1	0	14	99	75	1st	Lost Presidents Cup (Silver)
2001	14	13	1	0	26	186	111	1st	Lost Sr. B Finals
2002	14	7	7	0	14	128	131	4th	Lost 1st Round
2003	16	11	5	0	22	178	134	3rd	Lost 1st Round
2004	16	5	11	1	11	127	149	8th	did not qualify
2005	14	7	7	0	14	120	117	5th	Lost 1st Round
2006	14	7	4	3	17	129	127	4th	Lost Round 2
2007	14	5	9	0	10	100	125	3rd east division	Lost 1st Round
2008	14	8	6	0	16	112	105	1st east division	Lost Sr. B Finals
2009	16	9	7	0	18	200	163	4th	Lost 1st Round
2010	16	9	6	1	19	198	172	2nd	Lost 1st Round
2011	16	12	4	0	24	204	157	3rd	Lost 2nd Round
2012	16	8	7	1	19	164	166	5th	Lost 2nd Round
2013	16	8	8	0	16	138	154	4th	Lost 2nd Round
2014	16	1	15	0	2	115	197	7th	did not qualify
2015	16	9	6	1	19	140	126	3rd	Lost Sr.B Finals
2016	16	14	2	0	28	202	121	1st	Lost Presidents Cup (Bronze)
2017	16	4	11	1	9	112	152	5th	Lost 1st Round
2018	16	9	6	1	19	176	146	4th	Lost 1st Round
2019	15	9	6	0	18	157	123	3rd	Lost 1st Round
2020	Did not play								
2021	Did not play								
2022	16	4	11	0	8	122	135	6th	did not qualify
2023	16	11	5	0	22	167	158	2nd	Lost 1st Round
2024	16	13	3	0	26			2nd	Lost OSL Finals
2025	16	14	2	0	28	196	111	1st	Lost Presidents cup (Silver)
2026	12	10	2	0	20	146	86	2nd	Lost OSL Finals

== Notable alumni ==
- Steve Taylor
- Mike Fryer
- Steve McCarthy
- Jaret Bilich
- Mike Bilich
- Paul St. John
- Frank Littlejohn
- Paul Stewart
- Jonas Derks
- Joel Johnson
- Brad Reed+
- John Chessborough
- Duke McNutt
- Ryan Degerdon
- Kutis Wager+
- Mark Debrone
- Matt Spanger+
- Connor Kearnan+
- Brady Kearnan+
- Dylan Goddard
- Jordan Haber
- Luke Piltcher+
- Cory Upshaw
- Gary Muzzin
- Coady Adamson
- Brandon Turner
- Jeff Fernandes
- Chris Attwood
- Jake Harrington+
- Zach Higgins+
- Reily Hutchcraft+
- Deacan Knott+

+ = played in the NLL

== Team records ==
Individual player records for a single game
Statistic	Player	Total	Season
Most goals	Will MacLeod	8	2025
Most assists	Jack Oldman	10	2026
Most points	Liam Osborne	11	2025

Individual player records for a single Regular season
Statistic	Player	Total	Season
Most goals	Will MacLeod	38	2025
Most assists	Parker Pipher	50	2025
Most points	Jonas Derks	72	2001
Most Penalty Minutes	Frank Littlejohn	130	2002
Most Wins	John Chesebrough	9	2016
Best G.A.A	Deacan Knott	6.30	2025

Individual player records for a single post season
Statistic	Player	Total	Season
Most goals	Chris Attwood	36	2016
Most assists	Chris Attwood	25	2016
Most points	Chris Attwood	61	2016
Most Penalty Minutes	Nick Loyst	61	2015
Most Wins	John Chesebrough	7	2016

Individual player records for a Presidents Cup
Statistic	Player	Total	Season
Most goals	Chris Attwood	21	2016
Most assists	Zac Carrigan	16	2025
Most points	Chris Attwood	29	2016
Most Penalty Minutes	Jordi Jones-smith	45	2016
Most Wins	Deacan Knott	5	2025
Best G.A.A	JohnChesebrough	6.19	2016

== League Awards ==
OSL MVP

- 2011 John Chesebrough
- 2024 Deacon Knott

OSL Most Valuable Defensive Player

- 2016 Matt Spanger

OSL Best 2 way player

- 2015 Ryan Degerdon
- 2017 Graham Bergsma
- 2024 Parker Pipher
- 2025 Parker Pipher

OSL Rookie of the year

- 2011 Brad Levick
- 2012 Reed Board
- 2016 Brandon Staal
- 2025 Will MacLeod

OSL Most Dedicated

- 2022 Josh Medeiros

OSL Most Sportsmanlike

- 2011 Tommy Hurley
- 2015 Dylan Goddard

OSL Leading Scorer

- 2018 Dylan Goddard
- 2019 Dylan Goddard
- 2024 Parker Pipher

Top Goaltender(s) Lowest G.A.A.

- 2025 - Deacan Knott & Lukas Coote
- 2026 - Thomas Kiazyk, Ryan Schuetkowski & Ethan Harwood

OSL Coaching Staff of the year

- 2015 - Joel Johnson & Brad Reed
- 2016 - Joel Johnson & Brad Reed
- 2019 - Jason Crosbie & Brad MacArthur
- 2024 - Ryan Degerdon & Mark Debrone
- 2026 - Ryan Degerdon & Mark Debrone

== Presidents Cup Awards ==
MVP

First All star team

- Will MacLeod 2025
- Alex Marinier 2025

Second All star team

- Deacan Knott 2025
