= Oakville Rock =

- Sport: Box lacrosse
- Founded: 2003; 23 years ago (promoted to MSL in 2010)
- League: Major Series Lacrosse
- Team history: Ajax-Pickering Rock (2003–10); Ajax Rock (2011–12); Oakville Rock (2013–present)
- Based in: Oakville, Ontario
- Arena: Toronto Rock Athletic Centre
- Colours: black, red, white
- Owner: Jamie Dawick
- President: Jamie Dawick
- Head coach: Phil Sanderson

The Oakville Rock are Senior "A" box lacrosse team from Oakville, Ontario. They play in the Major Series Lacrosse league where under the current format, they compete in 20 regular season games (10 at home) from May through July and playoffs beginning in August and ending with the Mann Cup in September. The Rock play their home games at the Toronto Rock Athletic Centre in Oakville.

== History ==
Formerly the Ajax-Pickering Rock¸ the team began competition in 2003 in the Senior "B" loop. Within 3 years of their founding, the Ajax Rock finished first in the OLA Senior "B" League and reached the finals against the Owen Sound Woodsmen. In 2009 the Rock were promoted to the Senior "A" loop and would compete in the 2010 season.

Ajax Rock logo from 2011 to 2012.

The Rock's first MSL game was at home against the Brooklin Redmen on Sunday May 30, 2010. They would end up losing their first game their first game 11-7 with Defenseman Brandon Turner scoring their first goal 44 seconds into the first period. Their first win would come on Monday June 21 in Brooklin, winning 10-7. They would finish the 2010 campaign with a 3-13-0 record and would be swept by the Six Nations Chiefs in the first round of the playoffs.

In 2013, owner Rob Roche sought approval for the team to relocate from Ajax to Oakville sighting tiny crowds and a lack of competitiveness as key reasons for being unable to secure bigger talent to the club. Moving to the newly constructed Toronto Rock Athletic Centre and adding Toronto Rock GM Terry Sanderson seemed to be a logical choice. MSL and the OLA approved the move and the team relocated West of Toronto.

== Season-by-Season results ==
Season	GP	W	L	T	GF	GA	P	Results	Playoffs
Ajax-Pickering Rock
2003	16	11	5	0	132	115	22	4th OSBLL	Lost Quarter-Final
2004	16	8	7	1	122	110	17	4th OSBLL	Lost Semi-Final
2005	14	7	6	1	126	124	15	4th OSBLL	Lost Semi-Final
2006	14	10	3	1	128	97	21	1st OSBLL	Lost Final
2007	14	5	9	0	94	109	10	6th OSBLL	Lost Final
2008	14	5	9	0	100	113	10	5th OSBLL	Lost Quarter-Final
2009	16	9	6	1	153	172	19	3rd OSBLL	Lost Semi-Final
2010	16	3	13	0	121	176	6	6th MSL	Lost Quarter-Final
Ajax Rock
2011	20	3	17	0	147	230	6	6th MSL	Lost Quarter-Final
2012	14	1	13	0	94	166	2	6th MSL	Lost Quarter-Final
Oakville Rock
2013	20	2	17	1	140	205	5	6th MSL	Did Not Qualify
2014	18	6	12	0	147	159	12	5th MSL	Did Not Qualify
2015	18	7	11	0	129	153	14	3rd MSL	Lost Semi-Final
2016	18	10	7	1	162	123	21	4th MSL	Lost Semi-Final
2017	18	7	10	1	169	161	15	4th MSL	Lost Semi-Final
2018	16	10	5	1	152	132	21	2nd MSL	Lost Final
2019	18	10	8	0	180	145	20	3rd MSL	Lost Semi-Final
2021	8	2	6	0	85	99	4	5th MSL Classic	No Playoffs Held
2024	11	4	7	0	110	122	8	5th MSL	Lost Quarter-Final
2025	17	5	12	0	117	159	10	6th MSL	Did Not Qualify
2026	18	12	6	0	161	55	24	2nd MSL	Lost Quarter-Final

Note that the Oakville Rock did not compete at the Senior A level in 2022 or 2023 and instead operated as a Senior B team.

== See also ==
- Major Series Lacrosse
- OLA Senior B Lacrosse League
