= Owen Sound NorthStars =

- City: Owen Sound, Ontario
- League: OLA Senior B Lacrosse League
- Founded: 2001
- Home arena: Harry Lumley Bayshore Community Centre
- Colours: Orange, Black, and White

Franchise history
- 2001-2011: Owen Sound Woodsmen
- 2012-present: Owen Sound NorthStars

The Owen Sound NorthStars are a Canadian Senior box lacrosse team. The team played in the City of Owen Sound, Ontario, Canada and participate in the OLA Senior B Lacrosse League. As the Woodsmen they were two-time Presidents Cup National Champions, two-time National Silver Medalists, two-time National Bronze Medalists, and seven-time Ontario Lacrosse Association Senior B Champions.

The team changed their name to the NorthStars, in honour of the Owen Sound North Stars, in the fall of 2011.

== See also ==
- OLA Senior B Lacrosse League
- Presidents Cup (box lacrosse)
