= Mississauga Tomahawks Jr. B =

Lacrosse team

Mississauga Tomahawks
- Sport: Box lacrosse
- Founded: 1989
- League: OLA Junior B Lacrosse League
- Based in: Mississauga, Ontario
- Arena: Port Credit Arena
- Colours: Blue, Orange and White
- President: Craig Ferchat
- Head coach: John Ferchat
- General manager: John Ferchat

The Mississauga Tomahawks are a Junior "B" box lacrosse team from Mississauga, Ontario, Canada. The Mississauga Tomahawks play in the OLA Junior B Lacrosse League.

== History ==
Brampton Excelsiors 1989 - 1994
Brampton-Milton Mavericks 1995
Milton Mavericks 1996 to 2006
Mississauga Tomahawks 2007 to Present

The franchise has a storied history of owners, players, sponsors and supporters. The current owners brought the team to Mississauga by way of Milton.

The team began as a feeder team for the OLA Junior A Lacrosse League's Brampton Excelsiors. In 1995, the team went separate ways from its parent club and moved to Milton. Under the Junior "A" club, the franchise never really did that well. The release from the Junior "A" Excelsiors seemed to be a good thing. After two slow seasons, business seemed to pick up from 1997 until 1999. In 1999 The Milton Mavericks led by notable players such as Jim Leworthy, Andrew Hartholt, and arguably the best Jr’B goalie at the time Andrew Dowdell, made a valiant run at the Founders Cup Championship. The Mavericks entered the Founders Cup Tournament as underdogs, but quickly showed the rest of the field that they were there to win. The 1999 Mavericks squad eventually fell short losing the gold medal game to the Edmonton Minors, 13–10. Many players from both squads went onto to play in both the MSL and the NLL.

The team went on hiatus in 2000 after their 15-6-0 run in the 1999 season. When the team returned in 2002, they were not the same. After three mediocre losing seasons, the team went on hiatus again in 2005. When the team returned in 2006 under the new management of Craig Ferchat and Jim Meagher it had little or no support from either the Milton Minor Lacrosse Association or the Village of Milton. Local sponsorship was near zero and the player pool was small and shrinking, approximately 250 players in the last year.

Milton Mavericks 1996-2006

In the Fall of 2006 the team was moved to Mississauga and changed its name to the Mississauga Tomahawks Jr. B Lacrosse Club. In Mississauga it now enjoys a growing player pool of approximately 750-900 players/year, cooperation with the Mississauga Tomahawks Lacrosse Association and the Mississauga Tomahawks Jr. A team. The reception from the City of Mississauga and local sponsors is a change for the team.

The name change creates yet another chapter in Mississauga junior lacrosse history, for more info, please see: Mississauga Tomahawks.

== Season-by-season results ==
Note: GP = Games played, W = Wins, L = Losses, T = Ties, Pts = Points, GF = Goals for, GA = Goals against

Season	GP	W	L	T	GF	GA	PTS	Placing	Playoffs
1989	20	4	16	0	111	320	8	10th OLA-B	DNQ
1990	20	1	18	1	164	285	3	11th OLA-B	DNQ
1991	18	6	12	0	157	176	12	8th OLA-B	Lost quarter-final
1992	20	10	10	0	203	183	20	6th OLA-B	Lost semi-final
1993	22	11	10	1	178	194	23	6th OLA-B	Lost quarter-final
1994	22	11	9	2	190	191	24	5th OLA-B	Lost quarter-final
1995	22	7	13	2	192	244	16	3rd OLA-B Central	DNQ
1996	22	7	15	0	192	267	14	6th OLA-B West	DNQ
1997	22	11	10	1	237	238	23	5th OLA-B West	DNQ
1998	24	19	5	0	275	205	38	2nd OLA-B West	Lost quarter-final
1999	21	15	6	0	230	178	30	3rd OLA-B West	Lost quarter-final
2000	0	-	-	-	-	-	-	Folded	
2001	0	-	-	-	-	-	-	Folded	
2002	21	8	12	1	209	240	17	8th OLA-B West	Lost 1st round
2003	20	7	12	1	179	209	15	9th OLA-B East	DNQ
2004	20	2	18	0	141	266	4	10th OLA-B East	DNQ
2005	0	-	-	-	-	-	-	Folded	
2006	20	1	19	0	98	243	2	13th OLA-B East	DNQ
2007	20	8	11	1	177	186	17	8th OLA-B East	Lost 1st round
2008	20	1	18	1	120	217	3	12th OLA-B East	DNQ
2009	20	2	18	0	112	214	4	12th OLA-B East	DNQ
2010	20	8	11	1	123	160	17	8th OLA-B East	Lost 1st round
2011	20	8	12	0	178	218	16	8th OLA-B East	Lost 1st round
2012	20	4	16	0	151	296	8	10th OLA-B East	DNQ
2013	20	5	15	0	127	246	10	10th OLA-B East	DNQ
2014	20	3	16	1	137	272	7	11th OLA-B East	DNQ

== Notable alumni ==
- John Tavares
- Andrew Dowdell
- Chris Powless
- Jim Leworthy Jr
- Corey Leigh
