= West Coast Senior Lacrosse Association =

- Sport: Box Lacrosse
- Founded: 1968
- Commissioner: Ernie Truant
- No. of teams: 6 (1 inactive)
- Country: Canada
- Most recent champion: Ladner Pioneers (2026)
- Most titles: Ladner Pioneers (13)
- Website: WCLSA.ca

The West Coast Senior Lacrosse Association is a Senior B Canadian box lacrosse league. The teams are located in southwest British Columbia. Champions of the league move on to compete for the Presidents Cup, the Canadian National Senior B championship. Teams from the WSCLA have won the Presidents Cup 9 times, most recently the Ladner Pioneer's three peat in 2022, 2023 and 2024.

The league consists of 6 teams, 4 of which are located in the Lower Mainland, and two on Vancouver Island. In recent years, it has been dominated by two teams, the Ladner Pioneers and the Coquitlam (formerly Tri-City) Bandits, who between them have won 17 out of the 23 titles since 2000.

== History ==
The origins of the WCSLA date back to 1934, when the Inter-City Lacrosse League was founded. Box lacrosse had been adopted by Canada two years prior. This was the league that would go onto to spawn the Western Lacrosse Association, but for the first thirty years, the future Senior A and Senior B teams played in the same competition. That would change in 1968, when 4 of the more prominent clubs, the Salmonbellies, Burrards, Shamrocks and Adanacs, split to join the new professional National Lacrosse Association. When the NLA collapsed after two years, the four western teams returned to amateur status, creating the WLA. The teams who didn't go pro retained the Inter-City Lacrosse League name.

In 1968, the league consisted of 6 teams: the Surrey Riders, New West Blues, Vancouver Killarney, Chilliwack, North Shore Indians and Burnaby. 1970 saw the league officially change status to Senior B. In 1972 Harry George Woolley took over as commissioner, helping the Senior B league take giant strides toward respectability after years of having a reputation for being a men's recreational league. Woolley took drastic measures in changing the structure of the organization by implementing a league agreement, producing league perpetual trophies and crafting a new overall image. Attendance grew from only a half dozen people to several hundred fans during the playoffs. Out of the changes came the newly formed West Coast Senior Lacrosse Association (WCSLA) in 1973.

The President's Cup was held in BC for the first time in 1974. Hosted at Queen's Park Arena, the New West Blues and Prince George represented BC. Prince George would go on to win the Cup.

In 1978, the league's tenth anniversary season saw the following clubs compete: New West Whalers, North Shore Indians, Burnaby Klippers, Vancouver Blue Angels, Abbotsford Braves and White Rock Titans.

In 1991, the Langley Knights traveled to Czechoslovakia to represent BC and Canada in an international tournament.

In 2001, the league had grown to 8 teams. The Abbotsford Bandits, Ladner Pioneers, Langley Knights, North Shore Indians, Nanaimo Timbermen, Port Coquitlam Eagles, Surrey Rebels and Vancouver Burrards.

Over its history, the league has been very volatile, with a plethora of defunct teams. Only three of the current teams have remained in the same location their entire existence. The North Shore Indians were founded in 1968, and have gone through a few name changes, as well as multiple seasons where they had to suspend the teams operations. The Indians have won 3 Presidents Cups, in 1985, 1993 and 2001. The Ladner Pioneers and Nanaimo Timbermen have existed in their original locations since the 1980s. Ladner is the most successful team in the league, having won the tied most league titles, and 5 Presidents Cups, in 1998, 2004 and three from 2022-2024. Nanaimo has won 0 national championships.

Coquitlam originated as the Burnaby Lakers in 1987, playing there until 1999, when they moved to Abbotsford and changed their mascot to the Bandits. Their stay in the Fraser Valley was short, moving back to Burnaby in 2002 for one year before heading to Port Coquitlam and being renamed the Tri-City Bandits. As Tri-City, they experienced a golden age, winning 9 league titles in 10 years, although they did not have the same level of success on the national stage. The team moved once again in 2015, to Coquitlam, and changed their name again to the Adanacs, to match the cities Senior A team. The Senior B Adanacs played for 4 years, until Covid-19 forced the league to cancel the 2020 and 2021 seasons. When the league restarted, the team played as the Port Coquitlam Saints, adopting the name of that cities Junior A team. The Saints only lasted one year, before the franchise had to suspend operations. After a hiatus, they rejoined in 2025 as the Coquitlam Bandits. The Bandits won 1 Presidents Cup, in 1999 in their last year in Burnaby.

Victoria entered the league in 2016 as the Wolves. After the covid break, they were renamed to the Shamrocks, the same as the Senior A team. Unlike the Senior A Salmonbellies, New Westminster's Senior B team has had a history of moving and renaming. Beginning their history as the Langley Knights in 1989, they won the league title in their first year. The Knights would remain in Langley until 2006, winning a second league title in 2000. 2007 saw them move to New West, keeping the Knights moniker for one year before becoming the Royal City Capitals. Like most other teams, Covid-19 saw the Capitals undergo a change in name, to the recognizable Salmonbellies. Unfortunately the name change has not heralded a era of success, with the Bellies having only won 4 games total since the 2022 season.

On April 26th, 2026, the league announced that the Victoria Shamrocks would be unable to compete in the upcoming season due to unforeseen circumstances, reducing the number of teams to 5. The Pioneers won their 6th straight provincial title after defeating North Shore in 3 games. The Salmonbellies finished the season winless, extending their winless streak to 44 games.

== Teams ==
Team	City	Founded	Presidents Cups
Ladner Pioneers	Delta, British Columbia	1981	5
New Westminster Salmonbellies	New Westminster, British Columbia	1989 (as Langley Knights)	0
North Shore Indians	North Vancouver, British Columbia	1968	3
Victoria Shamrocks*	Victoria, British Columbia	2016 (as Victoria Wolves)	0
Nanaimo Timbermen	Nanaimo, British Columbia	1987	0
Coquitlam Bandits	Coquitlam, British Columbia	1987 (as Burnaby Lakers)	1

*On hiatus for the 2026-27 season

=== Past teams ===
- Abbotsford Extra Old Stockers (1980-81), formerly Abbotsford Braves (1978-79)
- Abbotsford Totems (1974), formerly Abbotsford MSA (1972-73)
- Burnaby Burrards (2008-10), formerly Vancouver Burrards (1992, 1999-2007), Vancouver Vipers (1994-98), Vancouver-Killarney Vipers (1993), Vancouver Sr. B (1989-91)
- Burnaby Kirby's Klippers (1976-81), formerly Burnaby Firefighters (1975), Burnaby Columbians (1973-74), Burnaby Kokanees (1971-72), Burnaby Lougheeds (1969-70), Burnaby Villa Motor Inn (1968)
- Chilliwack Mustangs (2009-11)
- East Vancouver Bluebirds (1984-86), formerly Vancouver Disco Sports Blue Angels (1978-83)
- Langley Warriors (2009-19)
- Nanaimo Labatts (1972-74)
- New Westminster Whalers (1979-80), formerly New Westminster Mr. Sport Hotel (1975-78), New Westminster Rebels (1974), New Westminster Blues (1970-73), New Westminster Labatt Blues (1969), Coquitlam Molsons (1968)
- Port Coquitlam A's (1971)
- Port Coquitlam Saints (1st Ed. 1990-2001), formerly Port Coquitlam Eagles (1988-89), Port Coquitlam Kirby's Klippers (1986-87), Port Coquitlam Whalers (1983-85)
- Port Coquitlam Saints (2nd Ed. 2022), formerly Coquitlam Adanacs (2016-20), Tri-City Bandits (2003-15), Burnaby Bandits (2002), Abbotsford Bandits (2000-01), Burnaby Bandits (1999), Burnaby Lakers (1992-98), Burnaby Cablevision (1989-91), Burnaby Lakers (1987-88)
- Port Moody Thunder (2012-15)
- Surrey Turf Hotel Ryders (1969), formerly Surrey Dells (1968)
- Valley Rebels (2005-19), formerly Surrey Rebels (1983-2004)
- Vancouver Totems (1973), formerly Vancouver Killarney Sr. B (1969-72)
- White Rock Hawks (1979), formerly White Rock Titans (1978)

== Champions ==
Season	Winner	Runner-up	Presidents Cup result
1968	Coquitlam Molsons		Nanaimo O'Keefes - Silver
1969	New Westminster Labatt Blues		Nanaimo Luckies - Gold
1970	New Westminster Blues		Silver
1971	Burnaby Kokanees		Silver
1972	New Westminster Blues		Silver
1973	New Westminster Labatt Blues		
1974	New Westminster Rebels		Bronze
1975	Port Coquitlam Chiefs		
1976	Burnaby Kirby’s Klippers	New Westminster Mr. Sport Hotel	
1977	Burnaby Kirby's Klippers		
1978	Burnaby Kirby's Klippers		
1979	North Shore Indians	Burnaby Kirby's Klippers	
1980	North Shore Indians		
1981	North Shore Indians		Bronze
1982	Vancouver Disco Sports Angels		Nanaimo City - Bronze
1983	Vancouver Disco Sports Angels		
1984	Port Coquitlam Whalers		
1985	North Shore Indians		Gold
1986	Surrey Rebels	Port Coquitlam Kirby's Klippers	Bronze
1987	Surrey Rebels	Ladner Pioneers	
1988	Surrey Rebels	Ladner Pioneers	Silver
1989	Langley Knights		Nanaimo Timbermen (host) - Silver
1990	Ladner Pioneers		
1991	Ladner Pioneers	Nanaimo Timbermen	
1992	Nanaimo Timberman	Burnaby Lakers	Silver
1993	North Shore Indians	Burnaby Lakers	Gold
1994	Burnaby Lakers	Ladner Pioneers	Silver
1995	Burnaby Lakers	Ladner Pioneers	Silver
1996	Burnaby Lakers	Ladner Pioneers	
1997	Ladner Pioneers	Burnaby Lakers	Bronze
1998	Ladner Pioneers	Nanaimo Timbermen	Gold
1999	North Shore Indians	Ladner Pioneers	Burnaby Bandits (host) - Gold, North Shore - Silver
2000	Langley Knights	Abbotsford Bandits	
2001	North Shore Indians	Abbotsford Bandits	North Shore - Gold, Abbotsford - Silver
2002	Nanaimo Timbermen	North Shore Indians	Bronze
2003	Nanaimo Timbermen	Tri-City Bandits	
2004	Ladner Pioneers	Tri-City Bandits	Ladner - Gold; Langley Knights (host) - Bronze
2005	Tri-City Bandits	Valley Rebels	Silver
2006	Tri-City Bandits	Ladner Pioneers	Ladner (host) - Bronze
2007	Ladner Pioneers	Tri-City Bandits	
2008	Tri-City Bandits	Ladner Pioneers	
2009	Tri-City Bandits	Ladner Pioneers	Silver
2010	Tri-City Bandits	Nanaimo Timbermen	
2011	Tri-City Bandits	Ladner Pioneers	
2012	Tri-City Bandits	Valley Rebels	
2013	Tri-City Bandits	Ladner Pioneers	
2014	Tri-City Bandits	Nanaimo Timbermen	
2015	Nanaimo Timbermen	Ladner Pioneers	
2016	Langley Warriors	Nanaimo Timbermen	
2017	Ladner Pioneers	Royal City Capitals	
2018	Nanaimo Timbermen	Ladner Pioneers	Silver
2019	Ladner Pioneers	Nanaimo Timbermen	
2022	Ladner Pioneers	North Shore Indians	Gold
2023	Ladner Pioneers	Victoria Shamrocks	Gold
2024	Ladner Pioneers	Victoria Shamrocks	Gold
2025	Ladner Pioneers	Victoria Shamrocks	
2026	Ladner Pioneers	North Shore Indians	TBD
