= Oakville Rock (Senior B) =

- City: Oakville, Ontario
- League: Ontario Series Lacrosse
- Founded: 2006
- Home arena: Toronto Rock Athletic Centre

Franchise history
- 2006-09: Wellington Aces
- 2010-11: Wellington Dufferins
- 2011: Wellington Dufferin Titans
- 2012-21: Oakville Titans
- 2022-2023: Oakville Rock Sr. B
- 2024-present: Hamilton Bengals

Championships
- League champions: OSL Championships: (2) 2018, 2023

The Oakville Rock Senior B are a Canadian Senior box lacrosse team. The team plays in the City of Oakville, Ontario, Canada and participate in Ontario Series Lacrosse.

== History ==
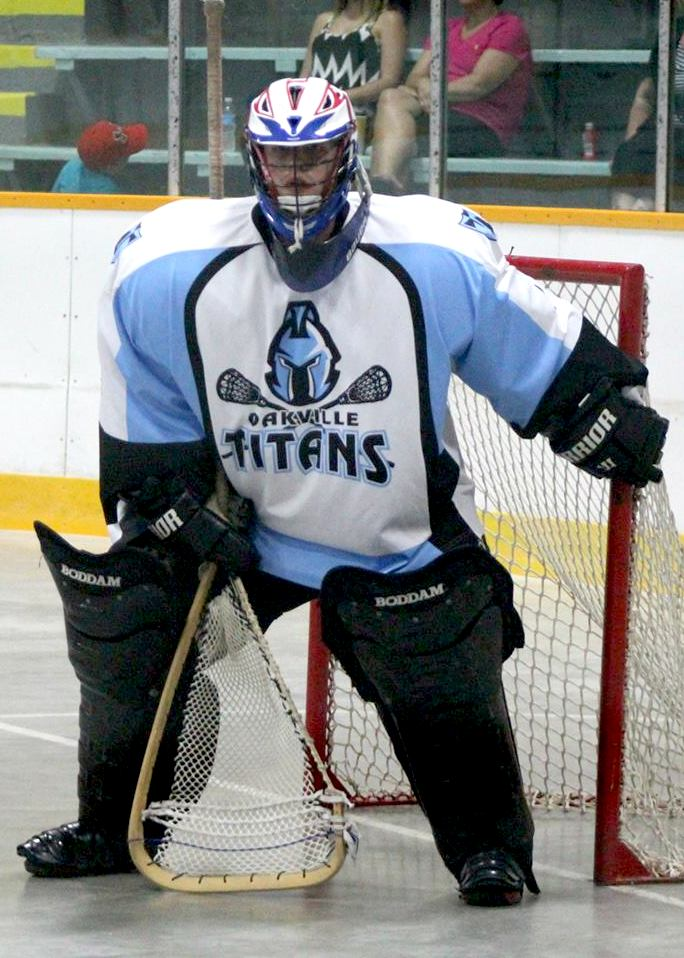
Titans goalie Craig Wende in 2015.

Established in 2006 as the Wellington Aces, the team was rebranded as Wellington Dufferins for the 2009 season. After two seasons the team was again renamed - now as Wellington Dufferin Titans.

In 2012, the club relocated to Oakville and became the Oakville Titans. In that season, the Titans finished second in the regular season, but lost in the semi-finals to an experienced Owen Sound Woodsmen squad.

The 2013 season was a challenging one for the program and marked the only time the team has missed the playoffs.

The team had back to back semi-final finishes in 2014 and 2015.

In 2015, the Titans relocated to the Toronto Rock Athletic Centre for their home games and became the only team in the league to play on turf.

After finishing third in the league in 2017 and a disappointing semi-final loss, the Titans made some key off season pickups and won their first Ontario championship in 2018. The Titans advanced to the Presidents' Cup where they would finish 5–3 in the round robin before losing the bronze medal game to Caughnawaga Indians 15–6.

Ownership and management changes prior to the 2022 season had the team rebranded as the Oakville Rock Senior B.

== Season-by-season results ==
Season	GP	W	L	T	Pts	GF	GA	Result	Playoffs
Oakville Titans
2012	16	11	5	0	22	176	166	2nd of 7	Lost semifinals vs Owen Sound, 0–3
2013	16	4	12	0	8	140	185	7th of 7	DNQ
2014	16	7	9	0	14	155	175	4th of 7	Won quarterfinals vs Owen Sound, 2–0 Lost semifinals vs Ennismore, 0–3
2015	16	7	9	0	14	135	137	5th of 7	Won quarterfinals vs Owen Sound, 2–0 Lost semifinals vs Six Nations, 0–3
2016	16	7	9	0	14	155	175	5th of 6	DNQ
2017	16	10	5	1	21	171	126	3rd of 6	Won quarterfinals vs Kitchener-Waterloo, 2–0 Lost semifinals vs Owen Sound, 0–3
2018	16	12	4	0	24	189	116	1st of 6	Won semifinals vs Brooklin, 3–2 Won finals vs Six Nations, 3–1
2019	16	12	4	0	24	163	105	2nd of 6	Won semifinals vs Brooklin, 3–2 Lost finals vs Six Nations, 1–3
Oakville Rock
2022	16	8	8	0	16	163	146	3rd of 6	Won semifinals vs Owen Sound, 3–1 Lost finals vs Six Nations, 0–3
2023	16	15	1	0	30	248	107	1st of 6	Won semifinals vs Owen Sound, 3–0 Won finals vs Six Nations, 2–1
Hamilton Bengals
2024	16	8	7	1	17	157	131	3rd of 6	Lost semifinals vs Brooklin, 0–3

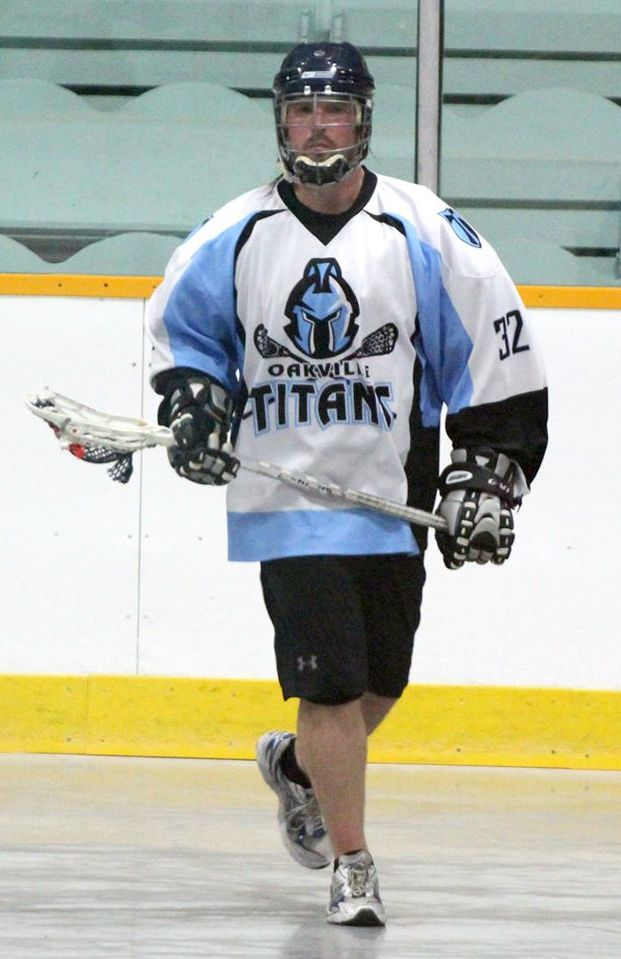
Titans player Todd Bloxam in 2015.

== Presidents Cup results ==
Season	GP	W	L	T	GF	GA	Result	Location
2018	9	5	4	0	75	74	4th	Nanaimo, BC
2023	8	6	2	0	94	56	3rd	Oakville, ON

== See also ==
- OLA Senior B Lacrosse League
- Presidents Cup (box lacrosse)
