= Ontario Series Lacrosse =

- Ontario Series Lacrosse
- Sport: Box lacrosse
- Founded: 1999
- No. of teams: 6
- Country: Canada
- Most recent champion: Six Nations Rivermen (2026)
- Most titles: 7 (Six Nations Rivermen, Owen Sound Woodsmen)
- Website: Ontario Senior Lacrosse

Ontario Series Lacrosse, known as the OLA Senior B Lacrosse League from 1999-2019, is a Senior box lacrosse league based out of Ontario, Canada sanctioned by the Ontario Lacrosse Association. Many of the players in the league play or have played in the National Lacrosse League. OSL winners earn a chance at the national championship—the Presidents Cup.

== History ==
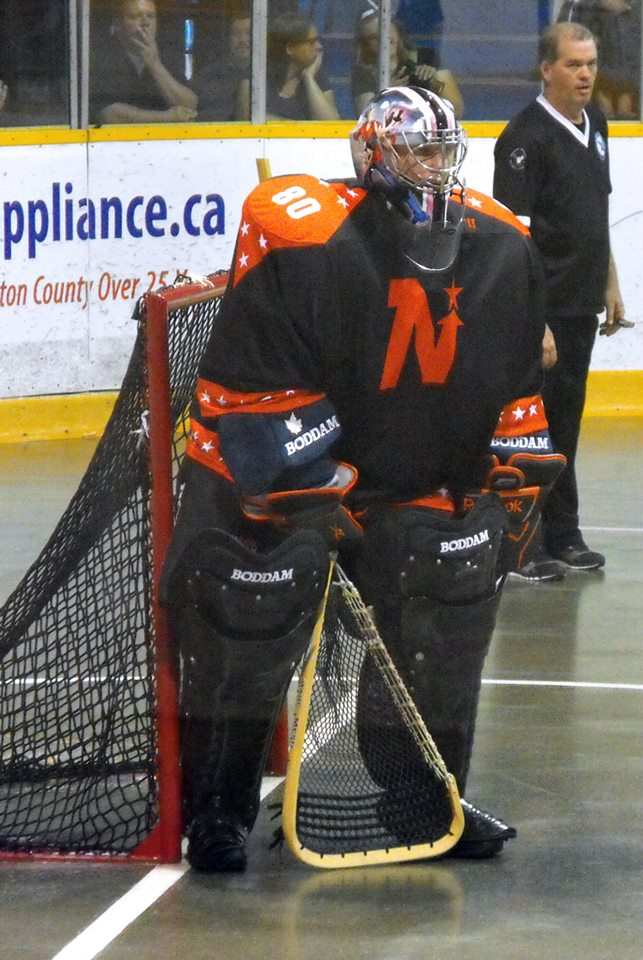
Owen Sound NorthStars' Scott Komer in 2014.

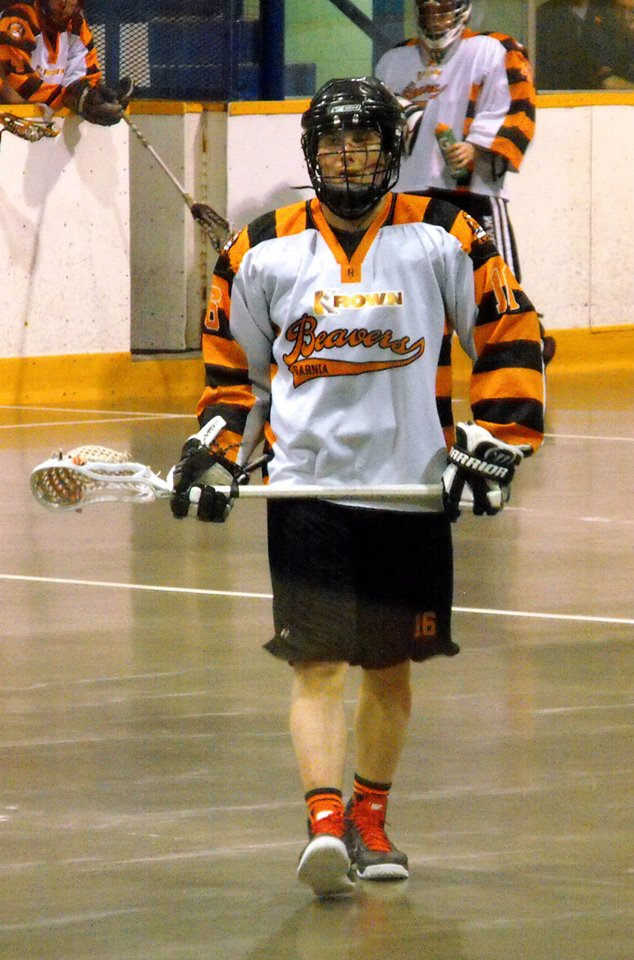
Sarnia Beavers' Colin McDowall in 2014.

The league was formed in late 1999 with play beginning in 2000. Founding members of the league were the Arthur Aces, Brooklin Merchants and St. Clair Storm. Burlington Chiefs, Owen Sound Woodsmen and Six Nations Crash and were accepted for the 2001 season.

The Ennismore Shamrocks were added for the 2002 season while the Six Nations Crash changed their named to the Six Nations Mohawk Stars.

The league expanded again for 2003 with the Ajax-Pickering Rock and Kitchener-Waterloo Kodiaks. The loss of the Burlington franchise for the 2004 season was offset by the addition of the Barrie Sr. Lakeshores.

Barrie won the league championship in their inaugural season and immediately moved to Major Series Lacrosse in 2005.

At the beginning of the 2006 season, the Kitchener-Waterloo Kodiaks purchased the St. Catharines Athletics MSL team, leaving the Senior B league at seven teams. Also in 2006, the Arthur Aces were renamed the Wellington Aces.

Prior to the start of the 2007 season, the St. Clair Storm announced that they were folding. The Ennismore Shamrocks changed ownership and became the Norwood Nitro, the first of three name changes to come.

In 2009, the Owen Sound Woodsmen became the first team in league history to win back-to-back Presidents Cups championships. In 2010, the Woodsmen would win their fourth-consecutive and seventh overall league title, both league records.

At the beginning of the 2010 season the Nitro changed their name to Norwood Champs, then Ennismore James Gang in 2013. Huntsville Hawks were added as a new franchise for the 2010 season.

St. Catharines Saints joined the league for the 2011 season and won the 2013 Presidents Cup in just their third season.

Sarnia Beavers joined in 2012 and the Six Nations Rivermen in 2013. Sarnia relocated as the Wallaceburg Thrashers for 2015.

After hosting the Presidents Cup in 2015, the St. Catharines Saints ceased operations.

In March 2016 the OSBLL announced expansion into Waterloo, Ontario, as the MSL's Kitchener-Waterloo Kodiaks had relocated to Cobourg, Ontario.

In 2019, the league rebranded as Ontario Series Lacrosse.

== Teams ==
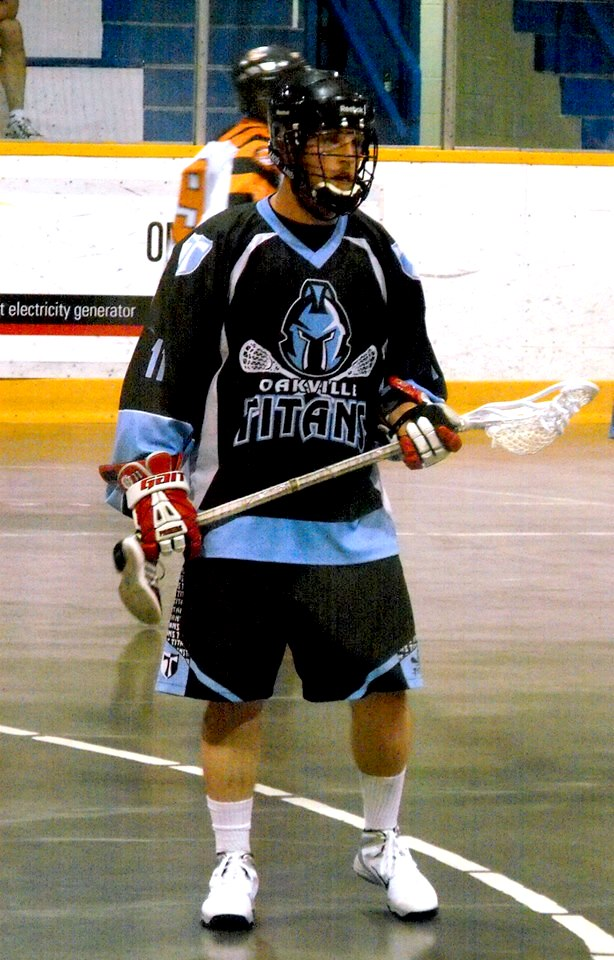
Oakville Titans' Mark Runciman in 2014.

| Team | Centre | Joined |
|---|---|---|
| Brooklin Merchants | Brooklin, Ontario | 2000 |
| Collingwood Cruise | Collingwood, Ontario | 2022 |
| Ennismore James Gang | Ennismore, Ontario | 2002 |
| Hamilton Bengals | Hamilton, Ontario | 2024 |
| Owen Sound NorthStars | Owen Sound, Ontario | 2001 |
| Six Nations Rivermen | Six Nations, Ontario | 2013 |
| Bellville Kodiaks | Bellville, Ontario | 2026 |

=== Former teams ===
- Oakville Rock Sr. B (2022–2023)
- Ajax-Pickering Rock (2003-2010)
- Oakville Titans (2006 - 2021)
- Arthur/Wellington Aces/Wellington-Dufferin Titans (became Oakville Titans in 2013)
- Barrie Sr. Lakeshores (2004)
- Burlington Sr. Chiefs (2001–2003)
- Ennismore Shamrocks/Norwood Nitro/Norwood Champs (became Ennnismore James Gang in 2013)
- Huntsville Hawks (2010-2012)
- Kitchener-Waterloo Kodiaks (2003-2006)
- Kitchener-Waterloo Velocity (2017-2019)
- Sarnia Beavers/Wallaceburg Thrashers (2012-2015)
- Six Nations Crash/Mohawk Stars/Ohsweken Warriors (2001-2011)
- St. Catharines Saints (2011–2015)
- St. Clair Storm (2001–2006)

== Clare Levack Memorial Trophy Champions ==
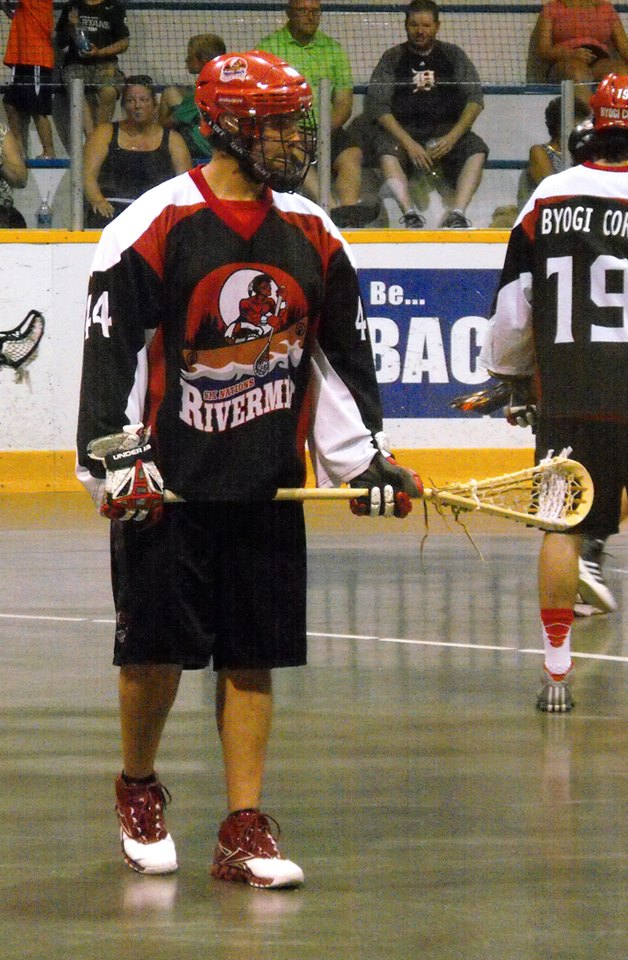
Isaiah Kicknosway of Six Nations Rivermen in 2014.

Champion moves on to the Presidents Cup national championship.

| Year | Champion | Finalist | Series |
|---|---|---|---|
| 2000 | Brooklin Merchants | St. Clair Storm | 3-2 |
| 2001 | Owen Sound Woodsmen | Brooklin Merchants | 3-0 |
| 2002 | Owen Sound Woodsmen | Mohawk Stars | 3-1 |
| 2003 | Owen Sound Woodsmen | Kitchener-Waterloo Kodiaks | 3-2 |
| 2004 | Barrie Lakeshores | Owen Sound Woodsmen | 3-2 |
| 2005 | Kitchener-Waterloo Kodiaks | Mohawk Stars | 3-0 |
| 2006 | Wellington Aces | Ajax-Pickering Rock | 3-1 |
| 2007 | Owen Sound Woodsmen | Ajax-Pickering Rock | 3-0 |
| 2008 | Owen Sound Woodsmen | Brooklin Merchants | 3-0 |
| 2009 | Owen Sound Woodsmen | Norwood Nitros | 3-0 |
| 2010 | Owen Sound Woodsmen | Norwood Nitros | 3-2 |
| 2011 | St. Catharines Saints | Owen Sound Woodsmen | 4-2 |
| 2012 | St. Catharines Saints | Owen Sound NorthStars | 4-0 |
| 2013 | St. Catharines Saints | Six Nations Rivermen | 3-0 |
| 2014 | Six Nations Rivermen | Ennismore James Gang | 3-1 |
| 2015 | Six Nations Rivermen | Brooklin Merchants | 3-0 |
| 2016 | Brooklin Merchants | Six Nations Rivermen | 3-0 |
| 2017 | Six Nations Rivermen | Owen Sound NorthStars | 3-0 |
| 2018 | Oakville Titans | Six Nations Rivermen | 3-1 |
| 2019 | Six Nations Rivermen | Oakville Titans | 3-1 |
| 2020 | No Season |
| 2021 | No Season |
| 2022 | Six Nations Rivermen | Oakville Rock | 3-0 |
| 2023 | Oakville Rock | Six Nations Rivermen | 3-0 |
| 2024 | Six Nations Rivermen | Brooklin Merchants | 3-1 |
| 2025 | Brooklin Merchants | Six Nations Rivermen | 2-0 |
| 2026 | Six Nations Rivermen | Brooklin Merchants | 3-2 |

== Championship results by team ==
| Team | Wins | Years won |
|---|---|---|
| Six Nations Rivermen | 7 | 2014, 2015, 2017, 2019, 2022, 2024, 2026 |
| Owen Sound Woodsmen | 7 | 2001, 2002, 2003, 2007, 2008, 2009, 2010 |
| Brooklin Merchants | 3 | 2000, 2016, 2025 |
| St. Catherines Saints | 3 | 2011, 2012, 2013 |
| Oakville Rock/Titans | 2 | 2018, 2023 |
| Wellington Aces | 1 | 2006 |
| Kitchener-Waterloo Kodiaks | 1 | 2005 |
| Barrie Lakeshores | 1 | 2004 |

== Presidents Cup winners ==
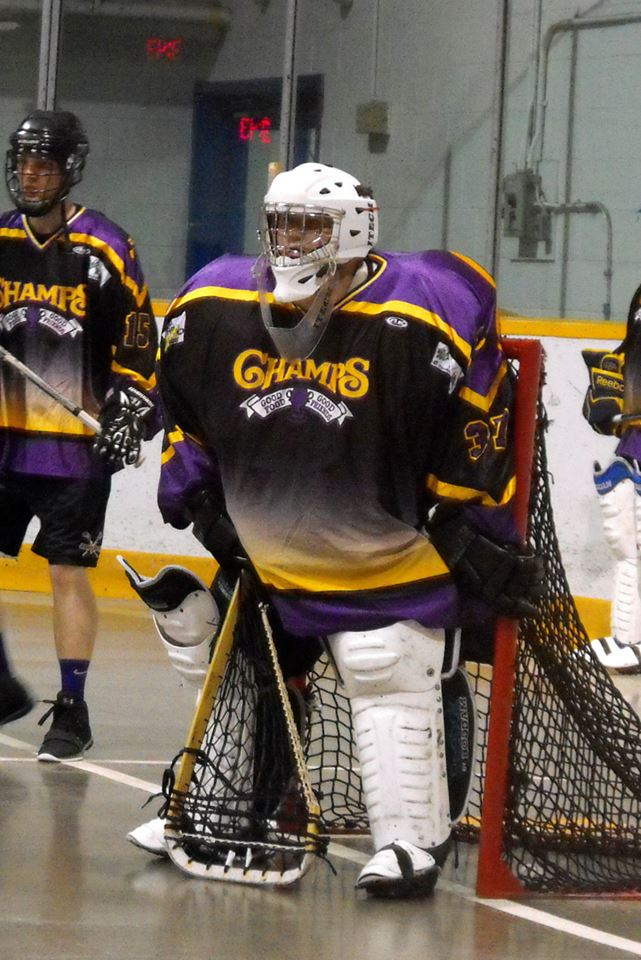
Ennismore James Gang goalie Cole Murray in 2014.

| Year | Winner | Tournament Host Location |
|---|---|---|
| 2003 | Kitchener-Waterloo Kodiaks | Owen Sound, ON |
| 2005 | Kitchener-Waterloo Kodiaks | Waterloo, ON |
| 2006 | Wellington Aces | Ladner, BC |
| 2008 | Owen Sound Woodsmen | Sherwood Park, AB |
| 2009 | Owen Sound Woodsmen | Hagersville, ON |
| 2013 | St. Catharines Saints | Kahnawake, QC |
| 2015 | Six Nations Rivermen | St. Catharines, ON |
| 2019 | Six Nations Rivermen | Kahnawake, QC |
