= Seneca WarChiefs =

- Sport: Box lacrosse
- Founded: 2013
- League: First Nations Junior B Lacrosse League
- Based in: Irving, New York
- Arena: Cattaraugus Community Center
- Head coach: Darris Kilgour
- General manager: Adrian Stevens
- Championships: 8 (2014, 2015, 2016, 2017, 2018, 2019, 2025, 2026)

The Seneca WarChiefs are a Junior "B" box lacrosse team from Irving, New York. The WarChiefs play in the First Nations Junior B Lacrosse League (FNJBLL), sanctioned by the First Nations Lacrosse Association (FNLA).

== History ==
Co-founded in August 2013 by long-time friends Charles Scanlan and Michael Snyder, Seneca WarChiefs were one of four founding member teams in the Iroquois Nations Junior B Lacrosse League. The WarChiefs are coached by long-time NLL player and coach Darris Kilgour. Kilgour is the winningest coach in NLL history.

Seneca played the first game in INJBLL history on May 24, 2014, defeating Tonawanda Jr. Braves 27-4 at Cattaraugus Community Center.

The WarChiefs finished their first regular season a perfect 12-0. Facing the second-place Onondaga Jr. Redhawks in the league championship, Seneca won the best-of five series 3-1 (20-7, 10-12, 18-5, 17-5). The INJBLL champions earned their spot in the 2014 Founders' Cup.

In round robin play Seneca defeated Team Quebec (22-10), Manitoba Blizzard (14-7), Team Nova Scotia (16-8) and Saskatchewan SWAT (18-8) while earning a tie against Red Deer Rampage (8-8). Their only loss in the round robin was a 12-6 defeat at the hands of the OJBLL champion Six Nations Rebels. Their 4-1-1 record was second best and earned their place in the gold medal game.

In the rematch against Six Nations, Seneca again came up second-best falling 14-7 to take the Silver Medal.

Seneca captured their third Founders' Cup medal in three years winning the Bronze in 2016.

== Season-by-season results ==
Note: GP = Games played, W = Wins, L = Losses, T = Ties, Pts = Points, GF = Goals for, GA = Goals against

Season	GP	W	L	T	Pts	GF	GA	Result	Playoffs	Founders' Cup
2014	12	12	0	0	24	x	x	1st, INJBLL	Won finals 3-1 vs Redhawks	4-1-1 round robin; Silver medalist (lost to Six Nations Rebels)
2015	10	10	0	0	20	227	46	1st, FNJBLL	Won final, 21-15 vs Redhawks	4-2-0 round robin; Silver medalist (lost to Akwesasne Indians)
2016	10	10	0	0	20	210	59	1st, FNJBLL	Won finals 2-0 vs Redhawks	2-1 round robin; Bronze medalist (defeated Calgary Chill)
2017	10	9	1	0	18			1st, FNJBLL	Won finals 3-0 vs Medicine Men	4-2 round robin; Bronze medalist (defeated Manitoba Blizzard)
2018	12	12	0	0	24	167	47	1st, FNJBLL	Won finals 2-1 vs Thunder	2-0-1 round robin, Silver medalist (lost to Elora Mohawks)
2019	12	12	0	0	24	164	67	1st, FNJBLL	Won finals 3-2 vs Redhawks	1-5-0 round robin; 5th Place (defeated Saskatchewan SWAT)
2022	12	10	1	1	21	140	63	1st, FNJBLL	Lost finals 2-1 vs Redhawks	DNQ
2023	12	10	2	0	20	132	90	2nd, FNJBLL	Lost finals 3-1 vs Redhawks	DNQ
2024	10	9	1	0	18	163	71	1st, FNJBLL	Lost finals 3-0 vs Redhawks	DNQ
2025	9	9	0	0	18	133	37	1st, FNJBLL	Won finals 3-0 vs Tomahawks	1-2 round robin, 5th place (defeated Queen City Kings)
2026	12	10	2	0	20	140	82	1st, FNJBLL	Won finals 3-0 vs Redhawks	4-1 round robin, Silver medalist (lost to Akwesasne Thunder)
TOTALS	121	113	7	1		1,476	553		8 Championships	4 Silver, 2 Bronze

== Founders' Cup ==
Year	Round Robin	Record W-L-T	Standing	Consolation Semifinal	Semifinal	5th Place Game	Bronze Medal Game	Gold Medal Game
2014; Halifax, NS	W, Team Quebec 22-10; L, Six Nations Rebels 6-12; T, Red Deer Rampage 8-8; W, Manitoba Blizzard 14-7; W, Team Nova Scotia 16-8; W, Saskatchewan SWAT 18-8	4-1-1	2nd of 7					L, Six Nations Rebels 7-14
2015; Calgary, AB	OTW, Saskatchewan SWAT 9-8; W, Manitoba Blizzard 19-6; W, Calgary Chill 11-9; W, Coquitlam Adanacs 9-6; OTL, Calgary Mountaineers 8-9; L, Akwesasne Indians 8-17	4-2-0	2nd of 7					OTL, Akwesasne Indians 6-9
2016; Orangeville, ON	W, Manitoba Blizzard 12-8; OTW, Coquitlam Adanacs 11-10; L, Orangeville Northmen 7-8; W, Team Nova Scotia 16-10	3-1-0	2nd of 4 Pool B		L, Clarington Green Gaels 7-14		W, Calgary Chill 17-8	
2017; Saskatoon, SK	W, Red Deer Rampage 11-9; W, Coquitlam Adanacs 7-3; L, Orangeville Northmen 1-9; L, Red Deer Rampage 5-10; W, Saskatchewan SWAT 13-11	3-2-0	3rd of 6				W, Manitoba Blizzard 15-8	
2018; Akwesasne	W, Coquitlam Adanacs 12-5; OTL, Calgary Shamrocks 8-9; W, North Shore Kodiaks 18-2	2-0-1	1st of 3 Pool B		OTW, Manitoba Blizzard 9-8			L, Elora Mohawks 5-9
2019; Winnipeg, MB	L, Coquitlam Adanacs 3-12; L, Calgary Shamrocks 5-16; L, Manitoba Blizzard 10-11; L, Six Nations Rebels 7-12; W, North Shore Kodiaks 19-14; L, Saskatchewan SWAT 9-12	1-5-0	6th of 7			W, Saskatchewan SWAT 16-5		
2025 Calgary, AB	W, Nova Scotia Privateers 18-3; L, Mountainview Mavericks 10-9; L, Kahnawake Hunters 10-5	1-2-0	3rd of 4 Pool B	W, Saint John Rapids 14-3		W, Queen City Kings 9-8 OT		
2026 Saint John, NB	W, Maverick Elite 9-6 W, Sackville Wolves 17-9 L, Akwesasne Thunder 11-5 W, Saint John Rapids 19-6 W, Port Coquitlam Saints 11-10	4-1-0	2nd of 6		W, Port Coquitlam Saints 17-11			L, Akwesasne Thunder 11-4
