= Elora Hawks =

Canadian box lacrosse team

- Sport: Box lacrosse
- League: OLA
- Based in: Elora, Ontario
- Arena: Jefferson Elora Community Centre
- Colours: Black, Gold, and White
- President: Brian Welsh
- Coaches: Kyle Goss; Asst. Coaches: Scott Cook; Blair Goss; Brady Landoni; Hyatt Welsh; Mason Noble
- General manager: John Clayton / Kyle Goss

The Elora Hawks are Junior "A" box lacrosse team from Elora, Ontario, Canada. The Hawks play in the OLA Junior A Lacrosse League.

== History ==
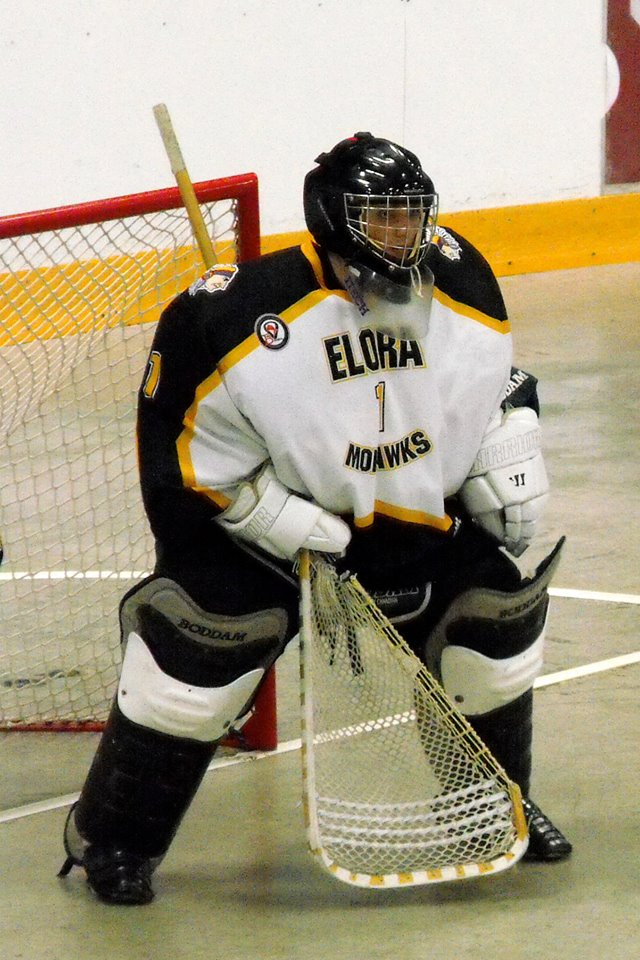
Elora Mohawks goalie 2014.

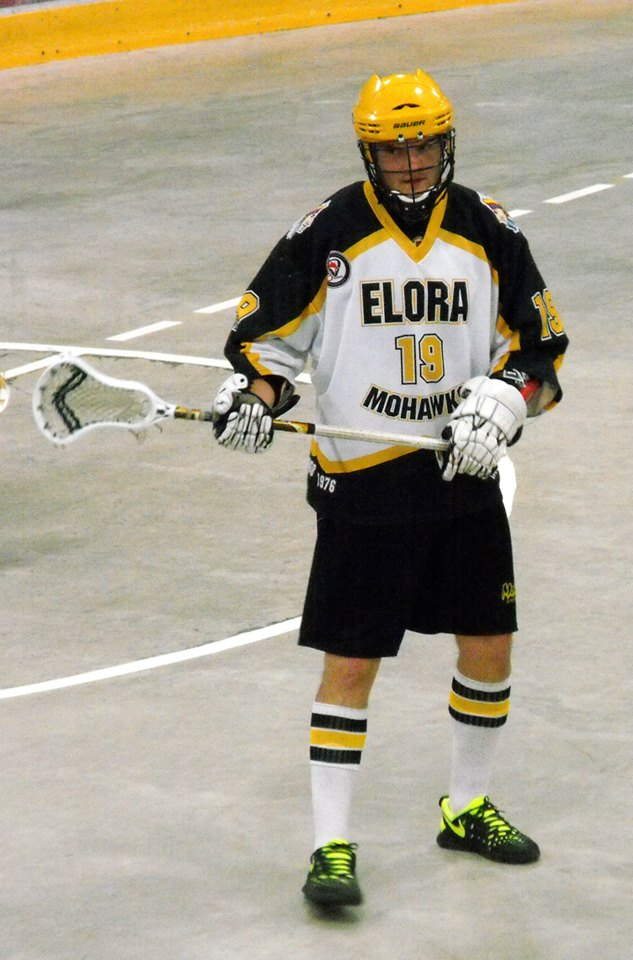
Elora Mohawks player 2014.

Probably founded in the 1960s, the Mohawks started out as the Fergus Thistles. In 1963, the team moved to become the Guelph Mohawks. In 1967 the team moved to Elora, Ontario and won the Canadian Castrol Cup in that year. They have bounced between the OLA Junior A Lacrosse League and the OLA Junior B Lacrosse League.

Fergus Thistles 19xx – 1962
Guelph Mohawks 1963 – 1966
Elora Mohawks 1967 to 2025
Elora Hawks 2025 to Present

On April 3, 2025, the team announced that the team will be renamed from the "Mohawks" to the "Hawks".

=== 2004 Playoff Run ===
The 2004 Season ended with the Mohawks tied for first place in the West with the Spartan Warriors with a 17–3–0 record. Prior to the season, it was announced that the Mohawks were to also host the 2004 National Championship—the Founders Cup. The Mohawks opened up the Playoffs against the 8th seed Windsor Fratmen. The upstart Fratmen had barely squeezed past the Wallaceburg Red Devils into the last playoff spot and had stolen a big 8–7 victory from the Division leading Sarnia Pacers to even make the playoffs. The series was a mismatch from the start—the Mohawks swept the Fratmen in three games. The second round put them up against the Orangeville Northmen, which also resulted in a three-game sweep. The Conference Final was against the Spartan Warriors, another easy three games. This set up a League Final between the Mohawks and the Clarington Green Gaels. In what had looked like a fourth straight possible sweep ended up going the distance. Despite crushing the Gaels in 2 of the first three games by scores of 16–4 and 12–1, the Gaels came back to win 3 of the last four games and upset the Mohawks for the league title.

As host of the 2004 Founders Cup, the Elora Mohawks received an automatic berth into the tourney and received a chance at redemption for the Provincial Title loss. The tourney started on August 21 with the Mohawks facing off against the Sherbrooke Jr. Extrême of Quebec. What occurred was nothing short of a massacre—30–1 Mohawks. Later that night, the Saskatoon Smash had received a similar demoralizing thrashing from the Mohawks, losing 27–5. The next night the Mohawks defeated the Delta Islanders of British Columbia 16–2. The night after, the Mohawks also beat the Calgary Mountaineers 11–4. The Mohawks appeared to back to their normal selves.

The Semi-final was against the Edmonton Warriors, and the Mohawks enthused the home crowd with a 16–5 win. The finals were to be played against the OLA Champion Clarington Green Gaels who were having an excellent tournament as well. The Mohawks had their chance at redemption, to avenge the team that took away their chance at their fifth OLA Jr B league title. The Finals did not go as planned for the again-favoured Mohawks. The Gaels won 11–8.

=== 2005 Playoff Run ===
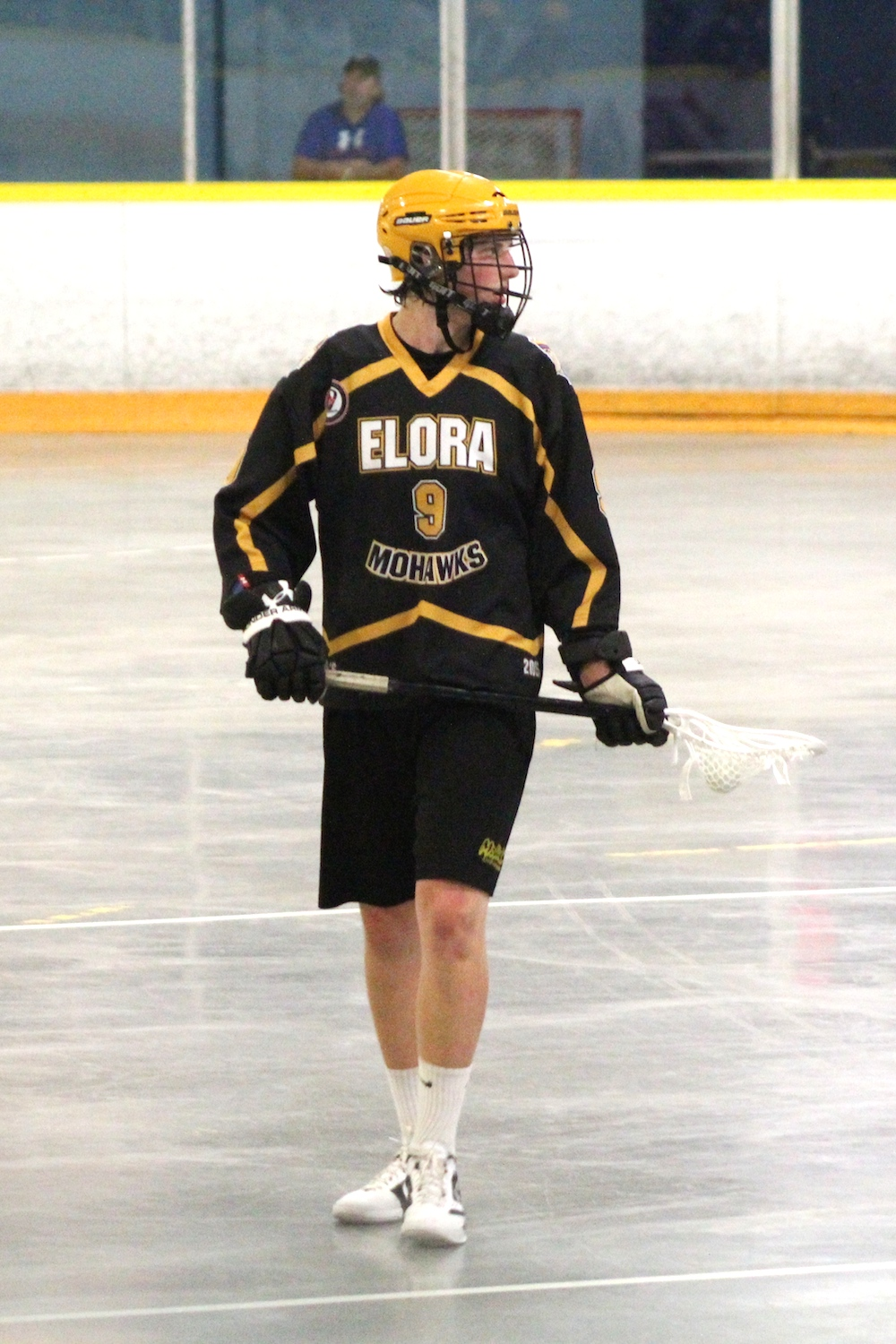
Elora's Kurtis Woodland during 2015 season.

After the disappointing 2004 Season, the Mohawks prepared for a rebuilding year. With 13 rookies, the Mohawks finished the 2005 season with an 11–9–0 record. The sixth-place finish pitted them against the Guelph Regals in the first round. Despite the Regals seemingly having the better club, the Mohawks swept the series with three straight victories. This upset prompted an immediate match up between the Mohawks and the first seed Spartan Warriors. Despite an 18–2–0 record, the series went the distance and in game five the Mohawks pulled the ultimate upset defeating the heavily favoured Warriors 9–6. In the Conference Final, the Mohawks then fought off the second seed Orangeville Northmen in 4 games to push into the league finals. The Finals pitted the Mohawks against the 2005 Cinderella Story Oakville Buzz. The Buzz were most lacrosse enthusiast's favourite to not only win the league, but to win the National title. What no one counted on was the playoff suave that would be exhibited by the Elora Mohawks. Elora went up 2 games to none quickly—9–7, 14–5. With the threat of elimination, the Buzz came on strong in Game 3, winning 9–4. But the Buzz could not stop the Mohawks, as the Elora squeaked out a 9–8 victory in Game 4 to win the OLA title and earn a berth into the Founders Cup tournament in Saskatoon, Saskatchewan.

On August 24, the Mohawks played their first game of their second straight Founders Cup tourney. In the first game against the Coquitlam Adanacs of British Columbia, the Mohawks got the ball rolling with a 12–6 win. The next night, the Mohawks beat the Sherwood Park Titans of Alberta 12–3. The Playdown Round then began. On August 26, the Mohawks defeated the Winnipeg Warhawks 13–2. Later that night, they also defeated the Calgary Mountaineers 7–2. The final Playdown game was against the Iroquois Lacrosse Association All-Stars, in which they defeated the ILA 14–3.

The victory against the ILA pushed the Mohawks through to the finals against the Edmonton Warriors. The Warriors could not match the Mohawks determination as the Mohawks won their second Founders Cup Championship as the best Junior "B" Lacrosse team in Canada—one year after everyone figured it would have happened.

== Season-by-season results ==
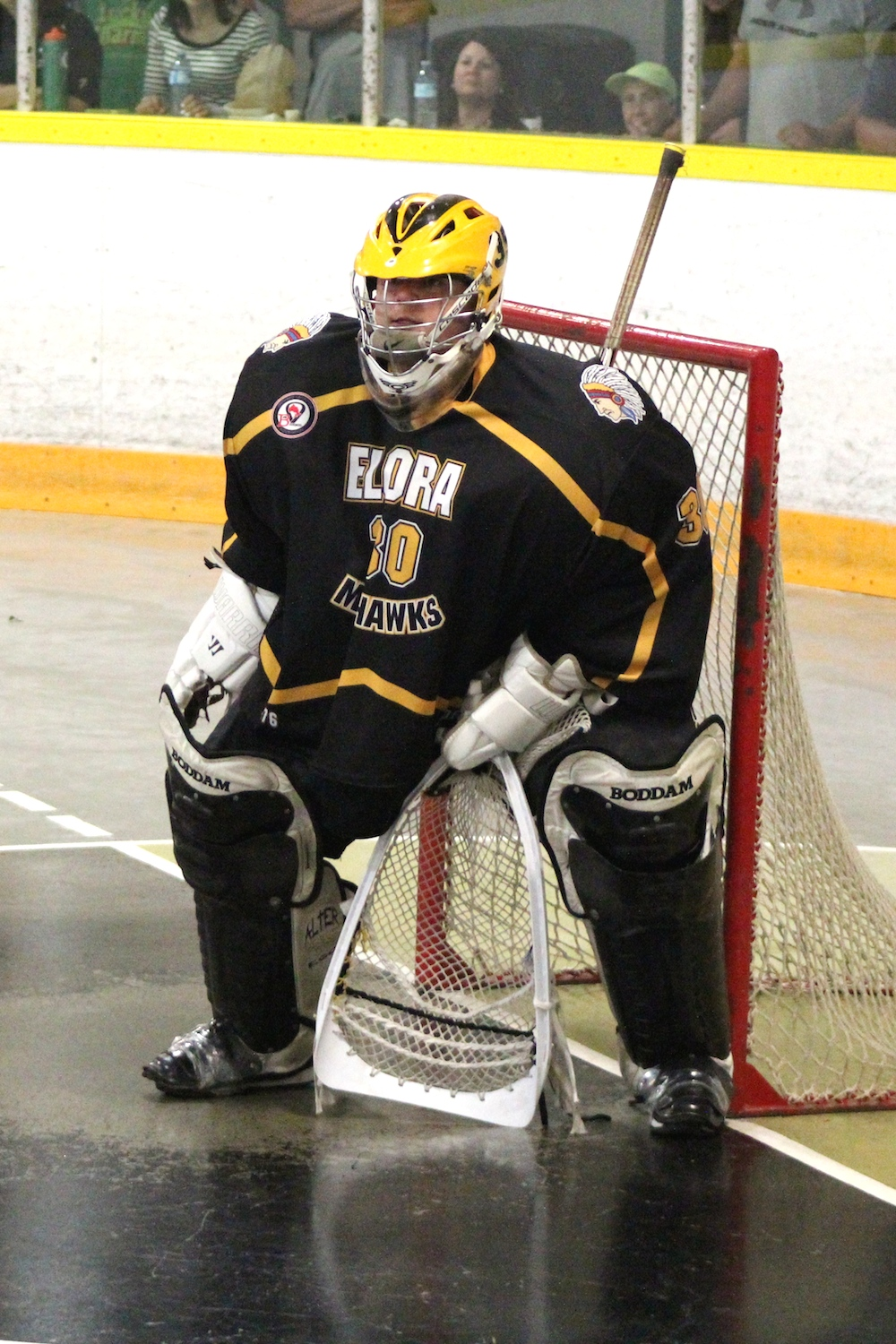
Mohawks goalie Brett Farrelly during the 2015 season.

Note: GP = Games played, W = Wins, L = Losses, T = Ties, Pts = Points, GF = Goals for, GA = Goals against

Season	GP	W	L	T	GF	GA	PTS	Placing	Playoffs
1961	22	15	7	0	325	211	32	3rd OLA-A	Lost semi-final
1962	20	3	17	0	138	302	6	6th OLA-A	DNQ
1963	24	10	14	0	227	259	20	5th OLA-A	Lost quarter-final
1964	24	7	17	0	236	295	14	8th OLA-A	DNQ
1965	20	1	19	0	182	394	2	9th OLA-A	DNQ
1966	Did not compete								
1967	14	14	0	0	299	107	28	1st OLA-B	Won final, won Castrol Cup
1968	18	16	1	1	0	0	33	1st OLA-B	Won final, won Castrol Cup
1969	24	5	19	0	278	452	10	8th OLA-A	Lost quarter-final
1970	24	13	11	0	342	321	26	3rd OLA-B West	Lost division semi-final
1971	24	13	11	0	350	320	26	4th OLA-B West	Lost division semi-final
1972	30	21	9	0	462	373	42	1st OLA-B West	Lost semi-final
1973	30	6	22	2	280	514	14	6th OLA-B West	DNQ
1974	25	7	18	0	241	344	14	5th OLA-B West	DNQ
1975	24	12	12	0	331	352	24	4th OLA-B West	Lost quarter-final
1976	24	20	4	0	429	294	40	2nd OLA-B West	Won final, won Founders Cup
1977	22	10	12	0	271	259	20	7th OLA-A	Lost semi-final
1978	24	19	4	1	347	222	39	1st OLA-A West	Lost final
1979	24	12	11	1	313	298	25	2nd OLA-A West	Lost semi-final
1980	20	8	12	0	224	286	16	7th OLA-A	Lost quarter-final
1981	20	5	15	0	206	374	10	8th OLA-A	Lost quarter-final
1982	20	3	17	0	161	322	6	9th OLA-A	DNQ
1983	24	1	23	0	186	398	2	9th OLA-A	DNQ
1984	24	2	22	0	221	447	4	7th OLA-A	Lost quarter-final, won Tier II Title
1985	24	7	17	0	253	366	14	5th OLA-A	Lost Tier II Final
1986	Did not compete								
1987	24	9	15	0	294	300	18	5th OLA-B West	DNQ
1988	20	13	7	0	306	230	26	2nd OLA-B West	Lost semi-final
1989	20	15	5	0	229	150	30	3rd OLA-B	Lost semi-final
1990	20	12	7	1	248	202	25	4th OLA-B	Lost semi-final
1991	18	14	4	0	251	185	28	2nd OLA-B	Lost League Final
1992	20	13	7	0	276	215	26	3rd OLA-B	Lost quarter-final
1993	22	13	9	0	259	222	26	4th OLA-B	Lost semi-final
1994	22	14	7	1	307	264	29	4th OLA-B	Lost semi-final
1995	22	9	12	1	237	254	19	4th OLA-B West	DNQ
1996	22	15	7	0	341	249	30	2nd OLA-B West	Lost semi-final
1997	22	9	13	0	265	256	18	6th OLA-B West	Won Tier II Title
1998	24	13	9	2	271	247	28	4th OLA-B West	Lost quarter-final
1999	21	21	0	0	296	169	42	1st OLA-B West	Won League, lost Founders Cup Bronze
2000	21	18	3	0	255	178	36	1st OLA-B West	Lost final, won Founders Cup Bronze
2001	20	19	0	1	344	91	39	1st OLA-B West	Lost Conference Final
2002	22	18	4	0	303	176	36	2nd OLA-B West	Lost Conference Final
2003	20	17	3	0	225	119	34	3rd OLA-B West	Lost quarter-final
2004	20	17	3	0	214	116	34	1st OLA-B West	Lost final, lost Founders Cup Final
2005	20	11	9	0	179	145	22	6th OLA-B West	Won League, won Founders Cup
2006	20	9	11	0	161	138	18	10th OLA-B West	DNQ
2007	20	14	6	0	187	132	28	3rd OLA-B West	Lost semi-final
2008	20	13	6	1	197	129	27	2nd OLA-B West	Lost Conference Final
2009	20	12	5	3	170	116	27	2nd OLA-B West	Lost final
2010	20	16	3	1	175	118	33	2nd OLA-B West	Lost final
2011	20	16	3	1	235	178	33	2nd OLA-B West	Lost Conference Final
2012	20	11	9	0	226	236	22	7th OLA-B West	Lost Conference Quarter-Final
2013	20	13	7	0	193	175	26	5th OLA-B West	Lost Conference Quarter-Final
2014	20	16	4	0	233	130	32	5th OLA-B West	Lost Conference Quarter-Final
2015	20	12	7	1	198	177	25	5th OLA-B West	
2016	20	11	9	0	200	178	22	T-2nd of 4 Mid West; T-5th of 13 Western; T-9th of 25 OJBLL	Lost Conf. QF, 1–3 (Clippers)
2017	20	14	6	0	193	109	28	2nd of 4 Mid West; 3rd of 13 Western; T-5th of 25 OJBLL	Lost Conf. QF, 2–3 (Bengals)
2018	20	17	3	0	218	98	34	1st of 4 Mid West; 2nd of 13 Western; T-3rd of 25 OJBLL	Won Conf. QF, 3–0 (Thunderhawks); Won Conf. SF, 3–1 (Red Devils); Won Conf. Final, 3–2 (Rebels); Won final, 3–1 (Green Gaels); Won Founders Cup (5–0)

== Founders Cup ==
CANADIAN NATIONAL CHAMPIONSHIPS

Year	Round Robin	Record W-L-T	Standing	Playdowns	Semifinal	Gold Medal Game
2004; HOST	W, Sherbrooke Xtreme 30–1; W, Saskatoon Smash 27–5; W, Delta Islanders 16–2; W, Calgary Mountaineers 11–4	4–0–0	1st of 5 Black Division	N/A	W, Edmonton Warriors 16–5	L, Clarington Green Gaels 8–11
2005; Saskatoon, SK	W, Coquitlam Adanacs 12–6; W, Sherwood Park Titans 12–3	2–0–0	1st of 4 A Division	W, Winnipeg Warhawks 13–2; W, Calgary Mountaineers 7–2	W, Iroquois Nationals 14–3	W, Edmonton Warriors 11–2; CHAMPIONS
2018; Akwesasne	W, Mohawk Medicine Men 16–8; W, Manitoba Blizzard 17–8; W, Saskatchewan SWAT 9–5	3–0–0	1st of 4 Group A	N/A	W, Coquitlam Adanacs 15–5	W, Seneca WarChiefs 9–5; CHAMPIONS
