= Calgary Shamrocks =

Canadian junior box lacrosse team

- Sport: Box lacrosse
- Founded: 2002
- League: Rocky Mountain Lacrosse League Junior B
- Based in: Calgary, Alberta
- Arena: Stu Peppard Arena
- Colours: Black, Green, Tan, and White
- Head coach: Jason Crook
- General manager: Jason Crook
- Championships: Founders Cup wins: 2019; RMLL Titles: 2018, 2019

The Calgary Shamrocks are a Canadian Junior box lacrosse team from Calgary, Alberta. The Shamrocks play in the Rocky Mountain Lacrosse League's Junior B Tier I league. On August 18, 2019, the Shamrocks became the fourth team in Alberta's history to win the Founders Cup national lacrosse championship.

== History ==
The Shamrocks appeared at the 2006 Founders Cup in Windsor, Ontario and the 2007 event in Kamloops, British Columbia, winning bronze at both events.

In 2018, the Shamrocks returned to the national championship, this time in Akwesasne. Despite winning four of their five games, they had to settle for fifth place, defeating Quebec's North Shore Kodiaks in their final game.

In 2019, they won their second consecutive Larry Bishop Memorial Cup as RMLL champions by sweeping the Fort Saskatchewan Rebels in two games. Then the Shamrocks travelled to Winnipeg, Manitoba for their fourth national competition. The Shamrocks finished the round robin in second with a 5-1 record, only losing to Ontario's Six Nations Rebels. In the gold medal game, the Shamrocks built up a five-goal lead on the Rebels going into the third and rode it to a 16-15 win. Calgary's Cordell Hastings was named most valuable player.

After the Enoch Tomahawks, Edmonton Miners, and Calgary Mountaineers, the Shamrocks are the fourth Albertan team to ever win the national Junior B title.

== Season-by-season results ==
Note: GP = Games played, W = Wins, L = Losses, T = Ties, Pts = Points, GF = Goals for, GA = Goals against

Season	GP	W	L	T	GF	GA	PTS	Season Placing	Playoffs
2002	20	8	12	0	177	210	16	3rd of 4 RMLL	Lost Semifinal, 0-2 (Warriors)
2003	20	2	18	0	126	281	4	4th of 4 RMLL	
2004	18	6	11	1	138	179	13	5th of 7 RMLL	
2005	20	4	16	0	118	190	8	5th of 6 RMLL	
2006	20	13	5	2	177	140	28	2nd of 8 RMLL	3rd of 9 Founders Cup (4-2)
2007	20	15	5	0	204	125	30	2nd of 4 South ? of 8 RMLL	Won South SF, 2-1 (Chill); Lost South Final, 0-2 (Mountaineers); 3rd of 11 Founders Cup (4-3)
2008									
2009	20	12	7	1	120	106	25	2nd of 4 South; 4th of 9 RMLL	3rd of 3 Round Robin (0-2)
2010	20	6	11	1	109	115	13	4th of 5 South; 7th of 10 RMLL	Won Qualifier Game, 7-1 (Silvertips); Lost South SF, 0-2 (Mountaineers)
2011	22	9	13	0	191	190	18	4th of 6 South; 7th of 11 RMLL	Won Qualifier Game, 15-3 (Silvertips); Lost South SF, 0-2 (Mountaineers)
2012	19	13	6	0	171	130	26	3rd of 6 South; 4th of 11 RMLL	Won South SF, 2-1 (Gryphons); Lost South Final, 0-2 (Mountaineers)
2013	20	11	9	1	200	157	23	4th of 6 South; 6th of 11 RMLL	Lost South SF, 0-2 (Mountaineers)
2014	20	7	13	0	150	211	14	4th of 6 South; 8th of 11 RMLL	Lost South SF, 2-3 (Chill)
2015	20	11	7	2	231	182	24	3rd of 6 South; 6th of 11 RMLL	Lost South SF, 1-2 (SWAT)
2016	20	19	1	0	276	165	38	1st of 6 South; 1st of 12 RMLL	Won South SF, 2-0 (Silvertips); Won South Final, 2-0 (Chill); 3rd of 4 SF Round Robin (1-2)
2017	20	14	6	0	249	184	28	2nd of 6 South; 4th of 12 RMLL	Lost South SF, 1-2 (Marauders)
2018	20	18	2	0	270	147	36	1st of 4 South; 1st of 15 RMLL	Won South Final, 2-1 (Mountaineers); 2nd of 5 Larry Bishop Round Robin (3-1); Won RMLL Final, 8-3 (Rampage); 5th of 8 Founders Cup (4-1)
2019	20	19	1	0	294	117	38	1st of 4 South; 1st of 15 RMLL	Won South Final, 2-0 (Mountaineers); 1st of 5 Larry Bishop Round Robin (4-0); Won RMLL Final, 2-0 (Rebels); Won Founders Cup (5-1)
2020								No Season - Covid	No Season - Covid
2021								No Season - Covid	No Season - Covid
2022	20	18	2	0	309	132	36	1st of 4 South; 1st of 15 RMLL	Won South Final, 2-0 (Mountaineers); 2nd of 5 Larry Bishop Round Robin (3-1); Lost RMLL Final, 14-7 (Warriors)
2023	20	14	6	0	220	162	28	1st of 4 South; 4th of 15 RMLL	Won South Final, 2-0 (Marauders); 3rd of 5 Larry Bishop Round Robin (2-2)
2024	20	19	1	0	283	116	38	1st of 4 South; 1st of 15 RMLL	Won South Final, 2-0 (Mountaineers); 4th of 5 Larry Bishop Round Robin (1-3)
2025	20	16	4	0	216	125	32	1st of 3 South; 2nd of 14 RMLL	Won South Final, 2-0 (Mountaineers); 2nd of 5 Larry Bishop Round Robin (3-1); Lost RMLL Final, 14-12 (Mavericks); Won Bronze Medal Founders Cup (Mavericks)
2026	18	14	3	1	189	120	29	1 of 6 South; 1 of 13 RMLL	Won South SF, 2-0 (Silvertips); Won South Final, 3-0 (Marauders); 1 of 4 Larry Bishop Round Robin (3-0); Lost RMLL Final, 11-8 (Mavericks)

== Championship Seasons ==
CHAMPIONSHIPS

South Division Champion	Larry Bishop Champion	Founders Cup Champion
2012; 2016; 2018; 2019; 2022; 2023; 2024; 2025; 2026	2018; 2019	2019

== Founders Cup Appearances ==
CANADIAN NATIONAL CHAMPIONSHIPS

Year	Round Robin	Record W-L-T	Standing	Quarter-final	Semifinal	5th Place Game	Bronze Medal Game	Gold Medal Game
2006; Windsor, ON	W, Saskatoon Smash 18-3; W, Sherbrooke Extreme 19-9; L, Oakville Buzz 3-12	2-1-0	2nd of 4 Gold Division	W, Edmonton Warriors 16-13	L, Oakville Buzz 9-21		W, Iroquois Nationals 14-4; Bronze Medal	
2007; Kamloops, BC	W, Saskatoon Swat 9-6; L, Calgary Mountaineers 5-6; W, Iroquois Lacross 11-2; L, Coquitlam Adanacs 5-11	2-2-0	2nd of 5 Pool B	W, Sherwood Park Titans 9-7	L, Six Nations 1-12		W, Calgary Mountaineers 6-5; Bronze Medal	
2018; Akwesasne	W, North Shore Kodiaks 13-6; OTW, Seneca WarChiefs 9-8; L, Coquitlam Adanacs 7-14	2-1-0	3rd of 4 Pool B		W, Saskatchewan SWAT 10-9	W, North Shore Kodiaks 11-7		
2019; Winnipeg, MB	W, Saskatchewan SWAT 23-9; W, Seneca WarChiefs 16-5; W, North Shore Kodiaks 12-5; W, Manitoba Blizzard 17-6; W, Coquitlam Adanacs 16-6; L, Six Nations Rebels 3-19	5-1-0	2nd of 7					W, Six Nations Rebels 16-15; CHAMPIONS
2025; Calgary, AB Host	L, Queen City Kings 9-10; L, Coquitlam Adanacs Jr. B 4-5; W, Saint John Rapids 11-8	1-2-0	2nd of 4 Pool A		L, Kahnakwake Hunters 6-12		W, Mountainview Mavericks 9-7; Bronze Medal	
