= AKO Fratmen =

AKO Fratmen were a series of sports teams in Windsor, Ontario, Canada, sponsored by the AKO Fraternity. Teams included:

- Windsor AKO Fratmen Lacrosse Team of the Ontario Lacrosse Association, now Windsor Clippers
- Windsor AKO Fratmen Football Team of the Canadian Junior Football League, now St. Clair Fratmen
- Windsor AKO Fratmen Baseball Team
