= Winnipeg Blizzard =

Major lacrosse Organization

- Nickname: Blizz
- Sport: Lacrosse
- Founded: 2014
- League: RMJALL and PGLL
- Division: Major
- Team history: Winnipeg Blizzard (2014 -Present)
- Based in: Winnipeg, Manitoba
- Arena: Notre Dame Arena
- Colours: Blue and White
- Championships: 3 Tier 1
- League titles: 3 Tier 1

The Winnipeg Blizzard are a Major Lacrosse Organization owned and operated by Terry Williams in Winnipeg Manitoba. The Organization consists of a Jr A team in the RMJALL, a Jr B team in the PGLL and a Senior B team in the PGLL.

== History ==
The team was originally formed in 2010 as the Manitoba Gryphons. This team was the first Manitoba-based team to join the Tier 1 Division in Rocky Mountain Lacrosse League. After a two-year probationary period the Gryphons were granted full league membership for the 2012 season in which they finished 10–9–0, sixth best in the 10-team league. They Gryphons were eliminated in the first round of the playoffs.

The Gryphons hosted the Founders Cup in 2013 in Winnipeg, finishing in fifth place. The team would see ownership changes in the off-season and were renamed the Blizzard. The club also relocated from their original home in Oakbank to Notre Dame Arena and further to Maples Community Centre, and as of 2025, back to the Notre Dame Arena, AKA, "The Icebox".

As the lone Junior B Tier 1 team in the province, the Blizzard annually represented Manitoba at the Founders Cup. The team has played for the Bronze medal on four occasions falling short each time.

It hosted the Founders Cup 2019 in Winnipeg.

In 2023, the team was renamed the Winnipeg Blizzard to drop the "Manitoba" name at the provinces request.

The team went on to win the 2024 Larry Bishop Memorial Trophy in Airdrie, Alberta. Over those 10 seasons, the Blizzard have been in five championship games, won the East Division 7x and with that win, claimed their third league Championship, making them the most winningest team in Jr B Tier 1 Division in over a decade. Looking to continue to grow, during the 2025 offseason, an application to move into the Jr A division was submitted. After a unanimous vote, the Blizzard has now moved into the RMJALL for the start of the 2026 season.

This elevation represents the next step for this program at the Tier 1 Junior B level. Over the past 10 years, the Winnipeg Blizzard, has established itself as the winningest franchise in the league.

Team success:

When asked, Williams credits the teams success to its past coaching staff and all the players that have transitioned through this program.

Impact to the Province:

When asked what the biggest impact this move will have on the Province, Williams said "This move up, now allows all the high performance athletes to compete at the highest level possible, without having to leave the Province"

Senior Program:

Continuing with the success of the Blizzard Organization, in 2025 saw the very first Blizzard Senior team, which attended the Presidents Cup in Whitby Ontario. This is the first time in close to 20 years, a Manitoba Senior team competed in this event. Williams was quoted saying "The ability to now provide a Senior program locally for all the graduating players, allows them to continue playing this sport within our Province."

For all Blizzard news, see them at www.winnipegblizzard.com

== Jr B T1 season-by-season ==
Manitoba Gryphons/Blizzard Jr B T1
Season	W	L	T	Pts	GF	GA	Finish	Playoffs	Founders Cup finish
2011	7	7	0	14	127	130	5th of 6 South	Not eligible	4th - Lost vs Saskatchewan SWAT
2012	10	9	0	20	170	201	4th of 6 South	Lost vs Calgary Shamrocks (2–1)	7th
2013	12	7	1	25	189	174	3rd of 6 South	Won vs Calgary Chill (2–0); Lost vs Calgary Mountaineers (2–0)	5th
2014	13	7	0	26	207	180	3rd of 6 South	DNQ	4th - Lost vs Nova Scotia
2015	14	6	0	28	209	145	2nd of 5 North	Won vs Edmonton Warriors (2–1); Round robin (2–1); Won vs Calgary Chill; Lost vs Saskatchewan SWAT League Finalists	5th
2016	15	5	0	30	235	151	3rd of 6 South	Won vs SWAT (2–0); Round robin (2–1); Won vs Red Deer Rampage; Won vs Chill - Champion	8th
2017	18	2	0	36	247	170	1st of 6 North	Round robin (2–1); Won vs Chill; Won vs Rampage - Champion	4th - Lost vs Seneca WarChiefs
2018	18	2	0	36	246	116	1st of 3 East	Won vs SWAT (2–0); Round robin (1–3)	4th - Lost vs Coquitlam Adanacs
2019	13	7	0	26	203	189	1st of 3 East	Won vs SWAT (2–0); Round robin (2-2)	4th - Lost vs Coquitlam Adanacs
2022	11	9	0	22	213	211	1st of 3 East	Won vs Kings (2–1); Round robin (0–4)	Did not attend
2023	13	7	0	26	239	179	2nd of 3 East	Won vs Kings (2–0); Round robin (3–1); Lost vs Warriors in Championship final League Finalists	Did not attend
2024	13	6	1	27	211	153	2nd of 3 East	Won vs Kings (2–0); Round robin (3–1); Won vs Mavericks - Champion	6th - Lost vs Mountainview Mavericks
2025	11	8	1	23	164	158	2nd of 3 East	Lost vs Kings (0-2)	Did not attend

== Founders Cup ==
Year	Round Robin	Record W-L-T	Standing	Semifinal	5th Place Game	Bronze Medal Game	Gold Medal Game
2015; Calgary, AB	L, Akwesasne Indians 8–15; L, Seneca WarChiefs 6–19; OTW, Calgary Mountaineers 7–6; L, Coquitlam Adanacs 7–10; L, Saskatchewan SWAT 3–15; OTW, Calgary Chill 11-10	2-4-0	5th of 7		W, Saskatchewan SWAT 9-6		
2016; Orangeville, ON	L, Seneca WarChiefs 8–12; L, Orangeville Northmen 3–9; OTL, Coquitlam Adanacs 9–10; L, Clarington Green Gaels 1-15	0-3-1	4th of 4 Pool B	L, Team Nova Scotia 13-6	L, Coquitlam Adanacs 9-12		
2017; Saskatoon, SK	L, Red Deer Rampage 9–11; L, Orangeville Northmen 8–12; W, Saskatchewan SWAT 16–15; W, Coquitlam Adanacs 14–11; L, Red Deer Rampage 7-10	2-3-0	4th of 6			L, Seneca WarChiefs 8-15	
2018; Akwesasne	W, Saskatchewan SWAT 10–6; L, Elora Mohawks 8–17; W, Mohawks Medicine Men 13-7	2-1-0	2nd of 3 Pool A	OTL, Calgary Shamrocks 8-9		L, Coquitlam Adanacs 8-9	
2019; Winnipeg, MB	W, North Shore Kodiaks 16–13; W, Seneca WarChiefs 11–10; L, Calgary Shamrocks 5–13; W, Saskatchewan SWAT 11–8; L, Six Nations Rebels 3–16; L, Coquitlam Adanacs 5-11	3-3-0	4th of 7			L, Coquitlam Adanacs 4-7	
2024 Hamilton, Ontario		2-2	3rd of 4 Pool A	W, Nova Scotia Privateers 7–6	L, Mountainview Mavericks 5–11		

== Presidents Cup ==
Year	Round Robin	Record W-L-T	Standing	Consolation Semi-Final	Consolation Final
2025 Whitby, Ontario	L, Ladner Pioneers 5-11 L, Allegany Arrows 6-24 L, Brooklin Merchants 9-14 L, Snake Island Muskies 3-20	0-4-0	4th of 4	L, Ladner Pioneers 6-9	
