= London Blue Devils =

- Sport: Box lacrosse
- Founded: 2003
- League: OLA Junior B Lacrosse League
- Based in: London, Ontario
- Arena: Nichols Arena
- Colours: Blue, Black, and White
- Head coach: Unnamed
- General manager: Kelli Prince

The London Blue Devils are Junior "B" box lacrosse team from London, Ontario, Canada. The Blue Devils play in the OLA Junior B Lacrosse League. The Devils home games are played at Nichols Arena.

== History ==
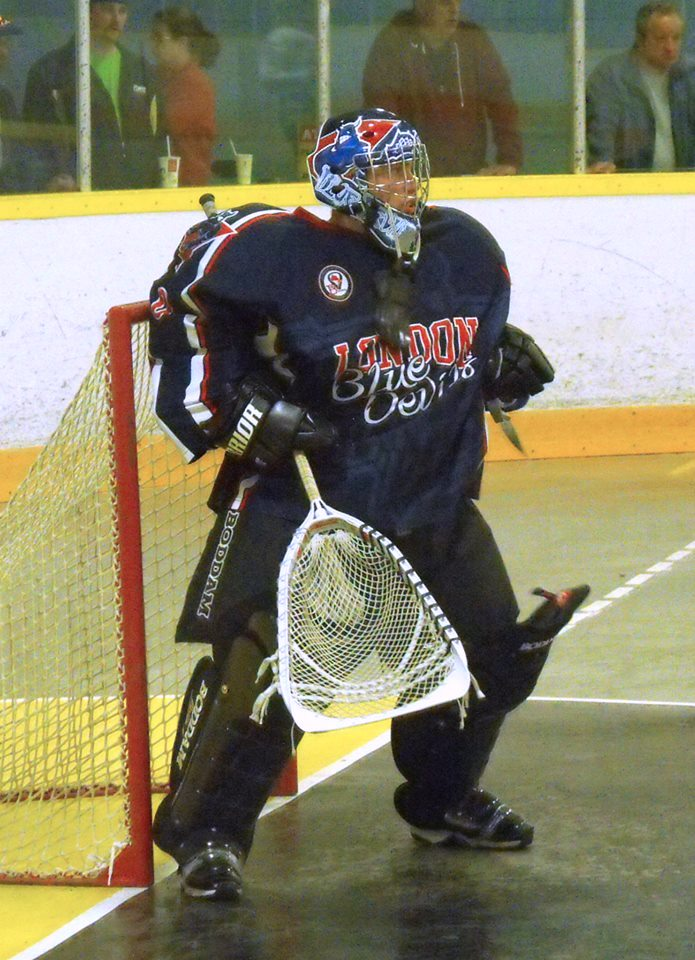
Blue Devils goalie in 2014.

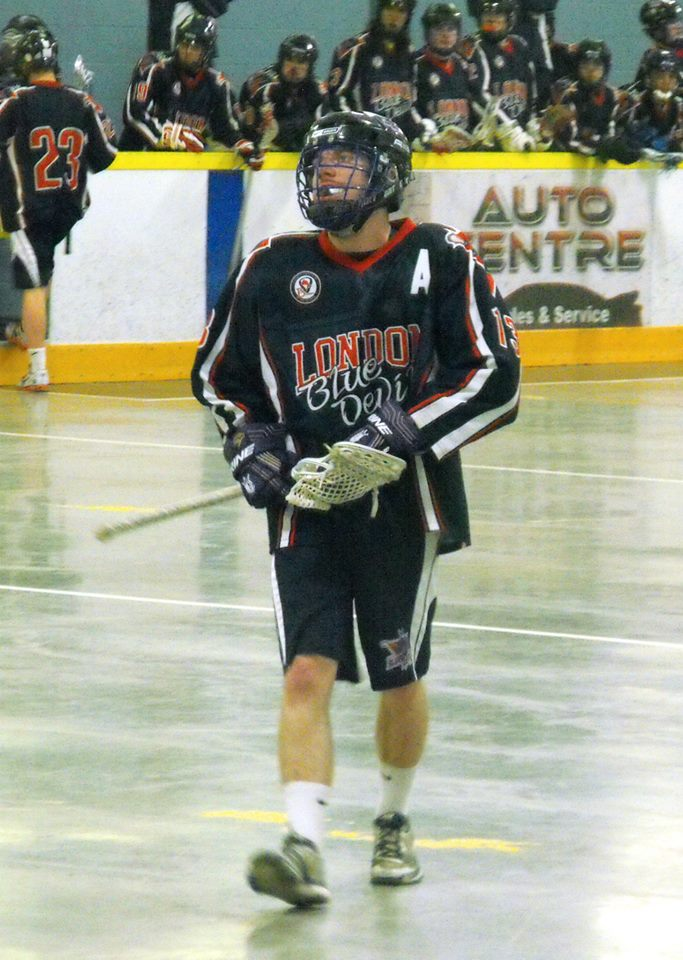
Blue Devils player in 2014.

The Blue Devils have been a charter member of the OLA since 2003. Success has not come easy for London in Junior "B", but every season has shown some improvement. The Blue Devils made the playoffs for the first time in 2011. The London Blue Devils entered the 2012 season with a very competitive team and finished with franchise best 14 wins and 6 losses. The Blue Devils were awarded 4 of the 6 Western Conference 2012 awards:

2012 Top Goaltender - Tyler Glebe

2012 Top Defender - Eric Guiltinan

2012 Most Sportsmanlike - Ian King

2012 Coaching Staff of Year - Jeff Williamson, Ian Gordon, William Byers, Darryl Van Slyke

2013 Most Sportsmanlike Player Western Conference Mike Rybka

2014 Most Sportsmanlike Player Western Conference Mike Rybka

== Season-by-season results ==
Note: GP = Games played, W = Wins, L = Losses, T = Ties, Pts = Points, GF = Goals for, GA = Goals against

Season	GP	W	L	T	GF	GA	PTS	Placing	Playoffs
2003	20	3	17	0	143	276	6	11th OLA-B West	DNQ
2004	20	4	16	0	145	225	8	11th OLA-B West	DNQ
2005	20	5	15	0	141	217	10	11th OLA-B West	DNQ
2006	20	5	14	1	151	169	11	11th OLA-B West	DNQ
2007	20	7	13	0	167	173	14	10th OLA-B West	DNQ
2008	20	2	17	1	115	206	5	13th OLA-B West	DNQ
2009	20	7	13	0	114	165	14	10th OLA-B West	DNQ
2010	20	8	12	0	139	153	16	9th OLA-B West	DNQ
2011	20	9	11	0	173	189	18	7th OLA-B West	Lost 1st Round
2012	20	14	6	0	190	143	28	2nd OLA-B West	Lost Conference Semi-Finals
2013	20	11	9	0	206	170	22	6th OLA-B West	Lost Conference Quarter-Finals
2014	20	4	16	0	157	252	8	11th OLA-B West	DNQ
2015	20	3	17	0	118	302	6	13th OLA-B West	DNQ
2016	20	0	20	0	99	316	0	13th OLA-B West	DNQ

== Playoff results ==
Season	Opponent	Series	GF–GA	Result	Round
2011	Elora Mohawks	0-3	18-30	Loss	Conference QF
2012	Elora Mohawks	3-1	36-30	Win	Conference QF
--	Wallaceburg Red Devils	0-3	33-38	Loss	Conference SF
2013	Windsor Clippers	1-2	27-39	Loss	Conference QF
