= Darris Kilgour =

Lacrosse coach

Darris Kilgour is a former professional lacrosse player and coach. Kilgour currently is the head coach of the Seneca WarChiefs (FNJBLL). He is from the Tuscarora Indian Reservation near Lewiston, New York.

== Player ==
Kilgour played for the Buffalo Bandits of the National Lacrosse League for eight seasons, before finishing his playing career with the Rochester Knighthawks and Albany Attack. As a player, he won three championships with the Bandits, and is the all-time team leader in penalty minutes and faceoffs. Kilgour's number '43' was retired by the Bandits in March 2001, making him the first player to have his number retired by an NLL team. He was inducted into the National Lacrosse League Hall of Fame in 2007.

In 1994, as a member of the Six Nations Chiefs, Kilgour was awarded the Mike Kelly Memorial Trophy as most valuable player in the Mann Cup competition.

== Coach ==
In 1998 Kilgour was assistant head coach under head coach, and former captain of the Rochester Knighthawks, Randy Mearns, at Canisius University. Kilgour became head coach of the Washington Power for the 2001 season. He led the Power to the playoffs in each of his two seasons as coach before returning to Buffalo as their head coach after the 2002 season. The Bandits posted a 12-4 record in 2003, and Kilgour was awarded the NLL Coach of the Year Award (later renamed to the Les Bartley Award). The next year, after a mediocre 8-8 regular season, the Bandits caught fire in the postseason, making it to the Championship game for the first time since 1997, but lost the championship game to the Calgary Roughnecks losing 14-11. In 2005 the Bandits would again make it to the Champion's Cup final, this time falling short against Colorado Mammoth 16-9.

Following the 2012 season, Kilgour was fired from his post as general manager of the Bandits, but continued to hold the position of head coach. A season later on June 10, 2013, the Bandits Director of Lacrosse Operations, Scott Loffler, informed Kilgour that he would not be retained as coach for the 2014 season.

Kilgour has more wins than any other coach in NLL history, surpassing Les Bartley's 93 wins on March 12, 2010 with the Buffalo Bandits defeating the Toronto Rock 11-10 in overtime at Toronto's Air Canada Centre.

Shortly after leaving the Buffalo Bandits, Kilgour was hired as head coach of the Seneca WarChiefs, a Junior B box lacrosse team who compete in the First Nations Junior B Lacrosse League.

=== NLL head coaching statistics ===
Team	Season	Regular Season				Playoffs				Playoff result
Team	Season	GC	W	L	W%	GC	W	L	W%	Playoff result
Washington Power	2001	14	9	5	.643	1	0	1	.000	Lost Semifinals (TOR)
Washington Power	2002	16	9	7	.562	2	1	1	.500	Lost Semifinals (TOR)
Buffalo Bandits	2003	16	12	4	.750	2	1	1	.500	Lost Semifinals (ROC)
Buffalo Bandits	2004	16	8	8	.500	3	2	1	.667	Lost Champions' Cup (CGY)
Buffalo Bandits	2005	16	11	5	.688	1	0	1	.000	Lost Division Semifinals (ROC)
Buffalo Bandits	2006	16	11	5	.688	3	2	1	.667	Lost Champions' Cup (COL)
Buffalo Bandits	2007	16	10	6	.625	2	1	1	.500	Lost Divisional Final (ROC)
Buffalo Bandits	2008	16	10	6	.625	3	3	0	1.000	Won Champions' Cup (POR)
Buffalo Bandits	2009	16	10	6	.625	2	1	1	.500	Lost Divisional Final (NY)
Buffalo Bandits	2010	16	8	8	.500	1	0	1	.000	Lost Division Semifinal (TOR)
Buffalo Bandits	2011	16	10	6	.625	2	1	1	.500	Lost Division Final (TOR)
Buffalo Bandits	2012	16	7	9	.438	1	0	1	.000	Lost Division Semifinal (TOR)
Buffalo Bandits	2013	16	6	10	.375	–	–	–	–	Did not qualify
Totals:	13	206	121	85	.587	23	12	11	.522	

== Player statistics ==
		Regular Season						Playoffs
Season	Team	GP	G	A	Pts	LB	PIM	GP	G	A	Pts	LB	PIM
1992	Buffalo	8	23	16	39	53	49	3	5	9	14	18	11
1993	Buffalo	8	11	17	28	69	31	2	2	3	5	21	12
1994	Buffalo	6	7	10	17	38	21	2	4	7	11	10	6
1995	Buffalo	6	8	12	20	17	25	1	1	4	5	5	12
1996	Buffalo	6	8	5	13	26	34	2	4	3	7	5	14
1997	Buffalo	8	21	21	42	56	34	2	3	4	7	20	2
1998	Buffalo	12	37	30	67	69	39	1	4	2	6	2	6
1999	Buffalo	8	13	16	29	40	24	--	--	--	--	--	--
1999	Rochester	2	3	3	6	3	0	2	3	3	6	5	4
2000	Albany	12	13	38	51	47	28	--	--	--	--	--	--
NLL totals		76	144	168	312	418	285	15	26	35	61	86	67

== Arrests ==
Kilgour was arrested on May 9, 2011 for drunk driving after the police found his car in a ditch in the Town of Lewiston. There were additional charges of unsafe backing, unlicensed operation of a motor vehicle, and refusal to take a breath test. In 2013, Kilgour got his second DWI arrest in Lewiston after being pulled over at 3:00 AM. He was also charged with speeding and operating a vehicle without insurance or a registration. Then, in 2014 he was arrested for second degree harassment, menacing and endangering a child after dropping his son of at his estranged wife’s house drunk. Once he reached the house, he reportedly approached the house with a hammer and shoved his estranged wife to the ground and harassed her boyfriend.

== Car accident ==
On September 2, 2018, Kilgour was the victim of a hit and run where he broke both tibias, his femur and dislocated a knee. He had to have a metal rod inserted into his femur. The man who ran him over, Clark Ivan Abrams, accepted a plea deal for first-degree reckless endangerment and had a blood alcohol content of 0.18 at the time of the accident.

== Awards ==
Preceded by Bob McMahon	NLL Coach of the Year Award; 2003	Succeeded by Paul Day
