= Oakville Buzz =

Canadian box lacrosse team

- Sport: Box lacrosse
- Founded: 2001
- League: OLA Junior A Lacrosse League
- Based in: Oakville, Ontario
- Arena: TRAC - Toronto Rock Athletic Facility
- Colours: Gold, Black, and White
- Head coach: Troy Cordingley
- General manager: Troy Cordingley
- National championships: 2006 - Founders Cup

The Oakville Buzz are Canadian box lacrosse team from Oakville, Ontario, Canada that play in the Ontario Junior A Lacrosse League. The Buzz played in the OLA Junior B Lacrosse League from 2001-2018. The Buzz won the 2006 Founders Cup Canadian Junior B National Champions.

== History ==
The Oakville Buzz were founded in 2001. In 2005, they were often thought to be next in line to win the National Title. These dreams were squashed by the surging Elora Mohawks squad in the League Finals.

=== 2006 playoff run ===
Finishing the 2006 season 19-1-0, their only loss came at the hands of the Mimico Mountaineers late in the season. The first round pitted them against the Halton Hills Bulldogs, whom they swept in three games. The Quarter-final was against Scarborough Saints, another three game sweep. The Conference Final was against Mimico Mountaineers, a third straight sweep. The Final was against the Orangeville Northmen. Oakville took Games 1 and 2 10-5 and 8-6. Orangeville gasped for breath in Game 3, handing the Buzz their second loss of the campaign 8-7. The Buzz shut the Northmen down in Game 4, but it was a close 5-1 game. The Buzz won their first ever league title and a trip to their first Founders Cup, to take place in Windsor, Ontario.

On August 23, the Buzz squared off against the Sherbrooke Jr. Extrême in their first ever national level game. The Buzz did not disappoint, winning 16-2. Their second game was a 19-5 win against the Saskatoon Smash the next night. Their third game was a 12-3 victory against the Calgary Shamrocks to clinch the pool's first seed. Their semi-final game was against the Calgary Shamrocks again, crushing them 21-9. This set up an All-Ontario Founders Cup Final between the Buzz and the Windsor Fratmen. The Fratmen finished the OLA regular season with a 13-6-1 record, winning their division. Despite the early tournament prowess of the Fratmen, the Buzz eased their way into a 10-4 victory to win their first ever Founders Cup National Title.

== Season-by-season results ==
Note: GP = Games played, W = Wins, L = Losses, T = Ties, Pts = Points, GF = Goals for, GA = Goals against

Season	GP	W	L	T	GF	GA	PTS	Placing	Playoffs
2001	20	5	15	0	150	202	10	10th OJBLL East	Did not qualify
2002	22	7	15	0	161	196	14	8th OJBLL East	Lost 1st round
2003	20	11	9	0	184	162	22	8th OJBLL East	Lost 1st round
2004	20	11	9	0	189	164	22	8th OJBLL East	Lost 1st round
2005	20	17	2	1	249	138	35	1st OJBLL East	Ontario Jr B Finalist
2006	20	19	1	0	251	109	38	1st OJBLL East	Won League, won Founders Cup
2007	20	14	4	2	207	140	30	4th OJBLL East	Lost 1st round
2008	20	17	3	0	195	122	34	1st OJBLL East	Eastern Conference Semi-Finalist
2009	20	12	8	0	139	116	24	6th OJBLL West	Lost Conference Quarter-Final
2010	20	11	9	0	168	158	22	7th OJBLL West	Lost Conference Quarter-Final
2011	20	13	7	0	209	138	26	5th OJBLL East	Lost Conference Quarter-Final
2012	20	13	6	1	231	146	27	4th OJBLL East	Lost Conference Semi-Final
2013	20	12	8	0	203	171	24	4th OJBLL East	Lost Conference Semi-Final
2014	20	16	4	0	228	147	32	2nd OJBLL East	Lost Conference Semi-Final
2015	20	12	8	0	206	171	24	5th OJBLL East	Lost Conference Final
2016	20	15	5	0	223	138	30	3rd OJBLL East	Lost Conference Final
2017	20	11	8	1	241	202	23	5th OJBLL East	Lost Conference Semi-Final
2018	20	17	3	0	242	134	34	2nd OJBLL East	Lost Conference Semi-Final
2019	20	9	11	0	142	162	18	7th OLA-A	Lost quarter-final
2020	Season cancelled due to COVID-19 pandemic								
2021	8	3	5	0	79	62	6	5th of 6 West; 8th of 11 OJLL	Did not qualify
2022	20	13	7	0	168	152	26	4th OJLL	Lost quarter-final, 3-2 (Northmen)
2023	20	13	7	0	171	180	26	4th OJLL	Lost quarter-final, 3-1 (Beaches)
2024	20	5	15	0	137	190	10	11th OJLL	Did not qualify
2025	20	4	16	0	161	200	8	10th OJLL	Did not qualify

== Founders Cup ==
CANADIAN NATIONAL CHAMPIONSHIPS

Year	Round Robin	Record W-L-T	Standing	Semifinal	Gold Medal Game
2006; Windsor, ON	W, Sherbrooke Jr. Extreme 16-2; W, Saskatoon Smash 19-5; L, Calgary Shamrocks 12-3	3-0-0	1st of 4 Pool A	W, Calgary Shamrocks 21-9	W, Windsor AKO Fratmen 10-4; CHAMPIONS

== Top 10 All Time Buzz Scoring ^{(to end 2018)} ==
Player	GP	G	A	Pts
Eddie Renaud	125	192	238	430
Josh Smyth	135	155	239	394
Brendan Thenhaus	97	169	208	377
Keyan McQueen	112	142	225	367
Adam Wolf	84	109	169	278
Foster Cuomo	71	122	132	254
Braden Gallant	96	107	129	236
Jaden Walcot	91	74	141	215
Matt Anderson	56	87	125	212
Spencer Gallant	105	72	140	212
