= Sherwood Park Titans =

The Sherwood Park Titans have a major box lacrosse club and a minor box lacrosse club. The major box lacrosse team which plays in the Rocky Mountain Lacrosse League. The Titans majors were granted an expansion franchise in the winter of 2003 for the 2004 season.

The Sherwood Park Titans minor box lacrosse club is one of the oldest clubs in the Greater Edmonton Lacrosse Council. Minor Box Lacrosse League for male and female players age 5-16 yrs living in Sherwood Park and rural Strathcona County. They were established in 1986 as an association and have been running a yearly season ever since. They host the Titans classic tournament every year in early June. One of the longest standing minor box lacrosse tournaments in western Canada.

The Titans Majors have experienced success from the start in 2004. The previous two seasons, the Titans were dominant in the Tier 2 league as they compiled a total of 32 wins, 2 losses and 1 tie. They also captured the Tier 2 Provincial championship in 2002 as well as 2003. The Titans hired Paul Rai as their first ever head coach.

== 2004 season ==
The Titans' first season of play in the RMLL Junior B circuit was successful as the team compiled an 11-7-3 record, good enough for third place. The Titans were eliminated from the playoffs first round by the Calgary Mountaineers, who in turn eventually claimed the RMLL Junior B Championship. The inaugural season was not without controversy as the Titans' home opener was marred by criminal charges that were laid against Titans player Jeff Benuik. These were in regards to a fight that occurred between him and Edmonton Warriors rookie Cam Ritchie. The charges against him were eventually dismissed. Also, the Titans were shorted a home game by the Calgary Mountaineers due to the Calgary Flames' playoff run in 2004. The Mountaineers were fined and forfeited the two points to the Titans.

== 2005 season ==
The Titans were poised to be the team to beat in 2005. With a long list of veterans returning to the team as well as a good group of rookies, the Titans were the team to beat in 2005.

The Titans were led by Jesse Draper and Jordan Houstra on offense and Jeff Benuik commanding the defense. The Titans acquired Russ Decker off waivers from the Edmonton Warriors and he was slotted into the mix between current goaltenders Darcy Niedzielski and Eric Mitskopolous.

The Titans started out of the gate extremely well staying on top of the RMLL standing for most of the season. The Titans ended up tied with the Edmonton Warriors for the league lead but the Titans claimed the regular-season title as they had a better "season series" with the Warriors. This was the Titans' first Regular season championship.

The Titans went into the playoffs with home floor advantage starting off with the Calgary Mountaineers. The Titans claimed the series 2–0.

The Titans for the first time in team history reached the RMLL Provincial Finals against their arch rivals the Edmonton Warriors. The Titans claimed the first game of the series winning 11–7. The second game went to the Warriors by a score of 11–2. Game three, in Edmonton, went to the Warriors by a score of 6–4. The Titans were on the verge of elimination as the Warriors led the best of 5 series 2–1. The Titans however fought back and tied the series at two games apiece. The last game of the provincials was played out of the Bill Hunter Arena, the Edmonton Warriors home arena, as the Titans' home rink was unavailable for the play. The game was very close as both teams jockeyed for position. However the climax was a line-clearing brawl that involved both teams' goaltenders. Eric Mitskopoulous, who was in net for the Titans, was ejected from the game, leaving the Warriors' goalie Tyler Suchan in net. Titans backup Darcy Niedzielski came in cold. The Warriors capitalized on the ensuing Power Plays that came from the line brawl and went up 7–4. Phil McIntyre scored to make the score 7-5 but it was little too late. The Warriors locked up the victory and claimed the Provincial Title.

== 2006 season ==
Many changes came about for the Junior Titans. Paul Rai resigned as head coach. Also with the new expansion in Junior A, the Titans' roster was sacked as many players were picked up through the Entry draft. In total twelve players from the Titans 2005 were gone. As well many players were over aged. All three factors did not bode well for the Titans.

The Titans hired former assistant coach Wayne Niedzielski to take on the head coaching duties. The 2006 was one that lacked much needed experience as they had only a total of four returning players to balance the leadership roles. The team started out decent with two wins and a loss but quickly they were decimated by that lack of leadership and overall skill. The team did not see much success through the rest of the season as they were inconsistent. However the game results were much closer than expected as the Titans were only losing games by a couple goals, something that is rare for a team that lacked the playing experience that the 2006 team experienced.

The Titans went into the playoffs as a long shot as they were facing off against the league leading Edmonton Warriors. The Titans however came to life in game 1, as Richard Cote forced a loose ball in the offensive end, changing the momentum and the Titans scoring to make it a 12–12 tie in Game One. The Game went to overtime and with the Titans shorthanded, the Titans lose 13–12 on the ensuing powerplay. Game two was at the Sherwood Park Arena and the Titans on the verge of elimination. The Titans fought back to win this game. An outstanding 3rd person performance by goalie Kyle Kowalchuck and with another loose ball from Cote, who fed it in front to an open D.J. Giaccobo. This was probably one of the most recent displays of determination. The Titans won the second game by a score of 7–6. The Titans were now slated to upset the Warriors and the Titans dominated the game play of both games. Game three at the Bill Hunter Arena again had its fair share of controversy. Between warmups and the start of the game, the Warriors requested the Titans changed benches. With the teams already throbbing with emotion and the game tied 1–1 in the second period, the Titans goaltender Kowalchuk was called on illegal equipment. The call was granted and Kyle was ejected from the game. The Titans then had to rally behind defenseman Brendan Sanche, who had to go in net as the Titans backup Austin Souliere was not able to attend the game. The Titans were decimated as they were down to three men as the Warriors had a powerplay before the call. The Warriors quickly made it a 5–1 game. Austin Souliere however did end up making it but was not able to stop the Warriors scoring. The game ended with a score of 7-2 and thus ending the Titans season.
