= First Nations Junior B Lacrosse League =

- FNJBLL
- Sport: Box lacrosse
- Founded: 2014
- First season: 2014
- Commissioner: Mark Brant
- No. of teams: 5
- Country: United States; Canada
- Most recent champion: Seneca WarChiefs (2026)
- Most titles: Seneca WarChiefs (8)
- Domestic cup: Founders Cup

The First Nations Junior B Lacrosse League (formerly Iroquois Nations Junior B Lacrosse League) is a box lacrosse league sanctioned by the First Nations Lacrosse Association. The league was formed in 2014 with the restructuring of the Canadian Lacrosse Association. Four teams competed in the inaugural season.

The league winner earns a spot in the Founders' Cup, the national championship of Junior B lacrosse in North America.

== History ==
The first game in INJBLL history was contested between Tonawanda and Seneca on May 24, 2014 at Cattaraugus Community Center. Seneca won the game 27–4. Brandon Brooks (7 goals, 6 assists) was named Player of the Game.

The WarChiefs finished a perfect 12–0 regular season and went on to win the playoff title over Onondaga 3–1 (best-of-5 series). Seneca finished as Silver medalist at the 2014 Founders Cup, falling 14-7 to the Ontario Junior B Lacrosse League champion Six Nations Rebels.

In 2015 the league joined forces with the Montreal Junior Lacrosse League to for a 7-team league, renamed First Nations Junior B Lacrosse League. Teams play each other twice in the regular season for a 12-game schedule.

Fédération de crosse du Québec (FCQ) member teams Montreal Jr. Shamrocks and Vermont Jr. Voyageurs are not eligible to represent the FNLA at Founders Cup.

On May 16, 2015, the Montreal Jr. Shamrocks won the first-ever FNJBLL game, 6–5 over Kanehsatake Warriors. The game was played at Aréna Kevin-Lowe in Lachute, Québec.

After playing eight games in the 2015 season the Jr. Voyageurs withdrew from the league, citing player commitments.

Seneca repeated as league champion in 2015 winning the two-day playoff tournament on July 24–25 at Cattaraugus Community Center. The WarChiefs defeated Tonawanda Jr. Braves 29–3 in a semifinal before downing Onondaga Jr. Redhawks in the championship game.

Kanehsatake Jr. Warriors went on hiatus for the 2016 season leaving the league with four teams. Seneca WarChiefs dominated the competition finishing a perfect 10–0 regular season, outscoring opponents 210–59. The WarChiefs went on to sweep Onondaga in a two games (best-of 3 playoff) to win their third-consecutive league championship.

== Teams ==
Team	City/Area	Arena	First Year
Allegany Jr. Arrows	Salamanca, NY	Allegany Community Center	2024
Onondaga Jr Redhawks	Onondaga, NY	Tsha'Hon'nonyen'dakhwa'	2014
Seneca WarChiefs	Seneca Nation of New York	Cattaraugus Community Center	2014
Tonawanda Jr. Braves	Basom, NY	Logan Field	2024
Tuscarora Jr. Tomahawks	Lockport, NY	Cornerstone CFCU Arena	2022

=== Former teams ===
Kanehsatake Jr. Warriors (2015)

Mohawk Medicine Men (2017–19)

Montreal Jr. Shamrocks (2015)

Onesquethaw Smoke (2023)

Onondaga Jr Redhawks (2025)**

Rochester J-Hawks (2014–16)

Six Nations Fire (2024-2025)

Tonawanda Jr. Braves (2014–17; 2022)

Tyendinaga Thunder (2018–19)

Tyendinaga Spearmen (2025)*

Vermont Jr. Voyageurs (2015)

*Tyendinaga did not compete in the 2025 season, however they remain in good standing with the league.

**Onondaga was on hiatus for the 2025 season but they have now returned to play for the 2026 season.

== Champions ==
Season	Winner	Runner-up	Finals result
2014	Seneca WarChiefs	Onondaga Jr. Redhawks	3-1 (best-of 5)
2015	Seneca WarChiefs	Onondaga Jr. Redhawks	21-15
2016	Seneca WarChiefs	Onondaga Jr. Redhawks	2-0 (best-of 3)
2017	Seneca WarChiefs	Mohawk Medicine Men	3-0 (best-of 5)
2018	Seneca WarChiefs	Tyendinaga Thunder	2-1 (best-of 3)
2019	Seneca WarChiefs	Onondaga Jr. Redhawks	3-2 (best-of 5)
2022	Onondaga Jr. Redhawks	Seneca WarChiefs	2-1 (best-of 3)
2023	Onondaga Jr. Redhawks	Seneca WarChiefs	3-1 (best-of 5)
2024	Onondaga Jr. Redhawks	Seneca WarChiefs	3-0 (best-of 5)
2025	Seneca WarChiefs	Tuscarora Jr. Tomahawks	3-0 (best-of 5)
2026	Seneca WarChiefs	Onondaga Jr. Redhawks	3-0 (best-of 5)

=== Founders' Cup ===
Season	Team	Results
2014	Seneca WarChiefs	Silver medal (lost to Six Nations Rebels)
2015	Seneca WarChiefs	Silver medal (lost to Akwesasne Indians)
2016	Seneca WarChiefs	Bronze medal (defeated Calgary Chill)
2017	Seneca WarChiefs	Bronze medal (defeated Manitoba Blizzard)
2018	Mohawk Medicine Men (host) Seneca WarChiefs	7th Place Silver medal (lost to Elora Mohawks)
2019	Seneca WarChiefs	5th Place (defeated Saskatchewan SWAT)
2022	Onondaga Jr. Redhawks	5th Place (defeated Saskatchewan SWAT)
2023	Onondaga Jr. Redhawks	4th place (defeated by Port Coquitlam Saints)
2024	Onondaga Jr. Redhawks	Bronze medal (defeated Victoria Shamrocks)
2025	Seneca WarChiefs	5th Place (defeated Queen City Kings)
2026	Seneca WarChiefs	Silver Medal (lost to Akwesasne Thunder)
