= Rocky Mountain Lacrosse League =

Box lacrosse league in Alberta, Canada

- Sport: Box lacrosse
- Country: Canada
- Website: rockymountainlax.com

The Rocky Mountain Lacrosse League (RMLL) is a box lacrosse league based in Alberta with three teams in Saskatchewan and, as of 2018, one in Manitoba. It is sanctioned by the Alberta Lacrosse Association. RMLL organizes all senior and junior play in the province. The league is broken into several divisions: Senior B, Senior C, Junior A, Junior B, Tier II and Tier III. Junior Ladies and Senior Ladies divisions were added in 2004 and 2011, respectively.

The RMLL is experiencing rapid growth as the popularity of box lacrosse increases, spurred on by the expansion of the National Lacrosse League to Calgary in 2001 and Edmonton in 2005. In 2002, 18 teams played in the RMLL at all levels. That number grew to 37 in 2005, then 59 in 2006. An all-time high 64 teams competed in 2016. As of 2026 there is 63 teams competing across nine divisions

== National championships ==
The RMLL is guaranteed at least one berth in each of the following national championship tournaments. Championship teams from Alberta are listed:

=== Presidents Cup ===
1975 - Edmonton Fullers
1983 - Calgary Mountaineers
2002 - Edmonton Outlaws
2007 - Sherwood Park Outlaws
2016 - St. Albert Miners
2017 - St. Albert Miners
2018 - St. Albert Miners
2026 - Edmonton Miners

=== Minto Cup ===
2026 - Raiders Lacrosse Club

=== Founders Cup ===
1980 - Enoch Tomahawks
1999 - Edmonton Miners
2009 - Calgary Mountaineers
2019 - Calgary Shamrocks
2023 - Edmonton Warriors

The RMLL currently is not eligible for the Mann Cup Senior A championship. However, the Calgary Chinooks won the Mann Cup in 1914.

== Champions ==
Year	Senior B	Senior C	Junior A	Junior B Tier I	Junior B Tier II	Junior B Tier III	Senior Ladies	Junior Ladies
1995	Edmonton Miners		Edmonton Miners					
1996	Edmonton Miners		Edmonton Miners					
1997	Edmonton Miners		Edmonton Miners					
1998	Edmonton Miners		Edmonton Miners					
1999	Edmonton Miners		Edmonton Miners					
2000	none		Calgary Mountaineers	Edmonton Warriors				
2001	Edmonton Outlaws		Edmonton Miners	Edmonton Warriors				
2002	Edmonton Outlaws		Edmonton Miners	Sherwood Park Titans				
2003	Edmonton Outlaws		Edmonton Miners	Edmonton Warriors	Sherwood Park Titans			
2004	Edmonton Outlaws		Edmonton Miners	Calgary Mountaineers	Edmonton Warriors			
2005	Sherwood Park Outlaws		Calgary Raiders	Edmonton Warriors	Red Deer Rampage			Sherwood Park Titans
2006	Sherwood Park Outlaws		Edmonton Miners	Edmonton Warriors	Medicine Hat Sun Devils	Calgary Mavericks		Sherwood Park Titans
2007	Sherwood Park Outlaws		Edmonton Miners	Calgary Mountaineers	Fort Saskatchewan Rebels	Vermilion Roar		Sherwood Park Titans
2008	Sherwood Park Outlaws		Edmonton Miners	Calgary Mountaineers	Fort Saskatchewan Rebels	Okotoks Icemen		Sherwood Park Titans
2009	Okotoks Raiders		Edmonton Eclipse	Calgary Mountaineers	Fort Saskatchewan Rebels	Medicine Hat Sun Devils		Sherwood Park Titans
2010	St. Albert Miners		Calgary Raiders	Calgary Mountaineers	Medicine Hat Sun Devils	Strathmore Venom		Sherwood Park Titans
2011	St. Albert Miners	Red Deer IFR Workwear Silverbacks	Calgary Raiders	Calgary Mountaineers	Edmonton Wizards	High River Heat	Calgary Cougars	Sherwood Park Titans
2012	Rockyview Knights	Calgary Irish	Calgary Mountaineers	Calgary Mountaineers	Vermilion Roar	High River Heat	Calgary Cougars	Sherwood Park Titans
2013	Calgary Mountaineers	Blackfalds Silverbacks	Calgary Raiders	Calgary Mountaineers	Medicine Hat Sun Devils	Medicine Hat Sun Devils	Calgary Cougars	Calgary Cardinals
2014	St. Albert Miners	Blackfalds Silverbacks	Calgary Mountaineers	Red Deer Rampage	Lethbridge Barracuds	Crowsness Pass Ravens	Edmonton Bandits	Sherwood Park Titans (A) St. Albert Drillers (B)
2015	Rockyview Knights	Blackfalds Silverbacks	Okotoks Raiders	Saskatchewan SWAT	Fort Saskatchewan Rebels	Olds Mavericks	Edmonton Bandits	Sherwood Park Titans
2016	St. Albert Miners	Airdrie Mohawks	Calgary Mountaineers	Manitoba Blizzard	Olds Mavericks	High River Heat	Edmonton Bandits	Sherwood Park Titans
2017	St. Albert Miners	Airdrie Mohawks	Okotoks Raiders	Manitoba Blizzard	Lethbridge Barracudas	Olds Stingers	Calgary Cougars	Sherwood Park Titans
2018	St. Albert Miners	Airdrie Mohawks	Okotoks Raiders	Calgary Shamrocks	Lloydminster Xtreme	West Kootenay Timberwolves	Calgary Cougars	Capital Region Saints
2019	St. Albert Miners	Airdrie Mowhawks	Okotoks Raiders	Calgary Shamrocks	Sylvan Lake Yetti	Cranbrook Outlaws	Sherwood Park Titans	Calgary Cardinals
2022	St. Albert Miners	Airdrie Mowhawks	Edmonton Miners	Edmonton Warriors	Cranbrook Outlaws			Sherwood Park Titans
2023	Edmonton Miners	Airdrie Mowhawks	Edmonton Miners	Edmonton Warriors	Cranbrook Blackwolves			Sherwood Park Titans
2024	Edmonton Miners	Airdrie Mowhawks	Raiders L.C.	Winnipeg Blizzard	Lakeland Heat			Calgary Cardinals
2025	Edmonton Miners	Airdrie Mowhawks	Raiders L.C.	Mountainview Mavericks	Lloydminster Xtreme			Rockyview Silvertips
2026	Edmonton Miners	Sylvan Lake Sasquatch	Raiders L.C.	Mountainview Mavericks	Lloydminster Xtreme			Capital Region Saints

== Teams ==
Senior B
Team	Centre	Home Arena
Beaumont Outlaws	Beaumont	Ken Nichol Reg. Rec. Arena 1
Calgary Mountaineers	Calgary	Stu Peppard
Fort Saskatchewan Rebels	Fort Saskatchewan	Jubiliee Rec Center - Ft Sask
Rockyview Knights	Airdrie	Plainsman
Edmonton Miners	Edmonton	Bill Hunter Arena formerly Jasper Place

Senior C
Team	Centre	Home Arena
North Division
Blackfalds Silverbacks	Blackfalds	Blackfalds Multiplex
Border Rage Lacrosse Club	Lloydminster	Russ Robertson Arena
Edmonton Warriors	Edmonton	Bill Hunter Arena formerly Jasper Place
Edmonton Miners	St. Albert	Bill Hunter Arena formerly Jasper Place
Lakeland Heat	Bonnyville	Bonnyville RJ Lalonde Arena
Parkland Posse	Spruce Grove	Grant Fuhr West Arena
Sylvan Lake Sasquatch	Sylvan Lake	Nexsource Centre- Rink 2
South Division
Airdrie Mohawks	Airdrie	Plainsman
Calgary Irish	Calgary	Stu Peppard
Calgary Bears	Calgary	Stu Peppard
Olds Stingers	Olds	Olds Sports Complex Main
Okotoks Erratic	Okotoks	Okotoks Recreation Centre - Murray Arena
Lethbridge Pioneers	Lethbridge	Coaldale Sportsplex

Junior A
Team	Centre	Home Arena
Calgary Mountaineers	Calgary	Stu Peppard
Calgary Raiders	Calgary	Max Bell Centre - Ken Bracko Arena
Saskatchewan SWAT	Saskatoon	Gordie Howe Kinsmen Arena
Edmonton Miners	Edmonton	Bill Hunter Arena
Winnipeg Blizzard	Winnipeg	Notre Dame Arena

Junior B Tier 1
Team	Centre	Home Arena
North Division
Edmonton Warriors	Edmonton	Bill Hunter Arena formerly Jasper Place
Fort Saskatchewan Rebels	Fort Saskatchewan	Jubiliee Rec Centre - Ft Sask
Beaumont Outlaws	Beaumont	Ken Nichol Reg. Rec. Arena 1
St. Albert Crude	St. Albert	Jarome Iginla Arena
Red Deer Rampage	Red Deer	Blackfalds Multiplex
Saskatchewan SWAT	Saskatoon	Gordie Howe Kinsmen Arena
South Division
Calgary Mountaineers	Calgary	Acadia Rec Centre
Calgary Shamrocks	Calgary	Stu Peppard
Calgary Chill	Calgary	Brentwood
Okotoks Marauders	Okotoks	Okotoks Murray Arena
Rockyview Silvertips	Cochrane	Spray Lakes - Totem 1
Mountainview Mavericks	Innisfail	Innisfail Blue Arena
Queen City Kings	Regina	Al Ritchie Arena

Junior B Tier 2
Team	Centre	Home Arena
North Division - Jim Andrews
Edmonton Warriors	Edmonton	Bill Hunter Arena formerly Jasper Place
Parkland Posse	Stony Plain	Grant Fuhr West Arena
Sherwood Park Titans	Sherwood Park	Ardrossan Recreation Complex East
St. Albert Crude	St. Albert	Servus Credit Union Place - Performance Rink
Sylvan Lake Yettis	Sylvan Lake	Nexsource Centre- Rink 2
Peace Country Honey Badgers	Grande Prairie	Dave Barr Comm Rink
Lakeland Heat	Cold Lake	Cold Lake Energy Center - Imperial Oil Place
Lloydminster Xtreme	Lloydminster	Hillmond Redden Arena
Red Deer Renegades	Red Deer	GH Dawe
South Division - Cindy Garant
Calgary Axemen	Calgary	Stu Peppard
Calgary Bandits	Calgary	Stu Peppard
Foothills Spurs	High River	Cargill Field House - High River
Southern Alberta Chaos	Taber	Taber Arena
Strathmore Venom	Strathmore	Strathmore - Gold
Calgary Wranglers	Calgary	Brentwood
Badland Lacrosse Club	Medicine Hat	Kinplex 1
MountainView Stingers	Didsbury	Didsbury Arena
Rockyview Rage	Rockyview	Spray Lakes Totem 1

Senior Ladies
Team	Centre	Home Arena
Calgary Cougars	Calgary	Stu Peppard
St. Albert Sr. Drillers	St. Albert	Jarome Iginla Arena

Junior Ladies
Team	Centre	Home Arena
Calgary Cardinals	Calgary	Brentwood
Capital Region Saints	Edmonton	Bill Hunter Arena formerly Jasper Place
Valkyries Lacrosse	Calgary	Okotoks Recreation Centre - Murray Arena
Red Deer Riot	Red Deer	GH Dawe
Rockyview Lady Silvertips	Calgary	Max Bell Centre - Ken Bracko Arena
Sherwood Park Lady Titans	Sherwood Park	Sherwood Park Arena
St. Albert Drillers	St. Albert	Jarome Iginla Arena
