= Windsor Clippers =

Canadian Junior Lacrosse Team

- Sport: Box lacrosse
- Founded: 2003
- League: Ontario Junior B Lacrosse League
- Conference: Western
- Division: Far-West
- Based in: Windsor, Ontario
- Arena: Forest Glade Arena
- Colours: Black, Gold and White
- Head coach: Jerry Kavanaugh
- General manager: Mike Soulliere
- History: 2003–2009: Windsor AKO Fratmen; 2010–present: Windsor Clippers

The Windsor Clippers is a Canadian junior box lacrosse team and members of the Ontario Junior B Lacrosse League of the Ontario Lacrosse Association. The team, from Windsor, Ontario, Canada, was known as the Windsor AKO Fratmen from 2003 until 2009 as they were sponsored by the AKO Fraternity.

== History ==
Original AKO Fratmen Logo.

The team made its expansion debut in the OLA Jr. "B" league in 2003. The team's first win was on April 30, 2003, against Wallaceburg, 21–12. In four completed seasons, the team has never failed to make the playoffs. The Fratmen hosted the 2005 Junior "B" All-Star Game, and in the team's fourth season Windsor hosted the 2006 Founders Cup. The Fratmen's first ever playoff victory came against the Six Nations Red Rebels in the 2005 Conference Semi-final. On July 2, 2005, the Fratmen defeated Six Nations in the first game of the series 6–4. Their first playoff round victory came in the 2006 Conference Semi-final against the Owen Sound Rams, 3-games-to-1.

At the 2005 All-Star Game in Windsor, Ontario, it was announced that the AKO Fratmen would host the 2006 Founders Cup Tournament.

At the 2006 Founders Cup on August 23, the Fratmen opened up the tournament with a 20–9 dismantling of the Nova Scotia Knights. Later that night, the Fratmen also beat the Langley Thunder 11–4. On August 24, the Fratmen topped the Edmonton Warriors by a score of 11–7. On August 25, AKO beat the Iroquois Lacrosse Association (a team composed mostly of players from Kahnawake, Quebec) by a score of 12–8. The victory clinched first place and a bye to the semi-final for the Fratmen, as both teams were undefeated (3–0) going into the game. Jamie Pillon led all round robin scoring with 22 points (9 goals, 13 assists), he was closely followed by the Andrew Ryckman (6 goals, 15 assists) and 2005 OLA Most Valuable Player David Hodgins (9 goals, 12 assists).

In the Semi-final on August 26, the Fratmen took on their most competitive opponent of the tournament to date, the Iroquois Lacrosse Association, for the second time. They came out on top again with a tight 6–3 victory. The Fratmen faced the OLA Champion Oakville Buzz in the Founders Cup Final. The Fratmen (5–0) and Buzz (4–0) were the only two undefeated teams left in the tournament at the time, and had not played against each other in the season.

On August 27, the AKO Fratmen played in the National Championship Game against the Oakville Buzz. The Fratmen and Buzz were tied 1–1 after the first period. The second saw the Buzz come alive, at the end leading by a score of 5–2. In the third, the Buzz blew the game wide open. The final score was 10–4, but the Fratmen held tough until the end. Cam Brown was named the Fratmen's Game MVP, while both Jamie Pillon and Matt Soulliere were named to the Founders Cup All-Star Team.

=== Clippers ===
In Fall 2013, the Canadian Lacrosse Association honoured long-time general manager and co-founder of the team Mike Soulliere with an award for his dedication to the development of the sport.

== Season-by-season results ==
Note: GP = Games played, W = Wins, L = Losses, T = Ties, Pts = Points, GF = Goals for, GA = Goals against

Season	GP	W	L	T	GF	GA	PTS	Finish	Playoffs	Coach	Captain
Windsor AKO Fratmen
2003	20	5	14	1	209	232	11	2nd of 4 Far West; 10th of 14 Western; 17th of 25 OJBLL	Lost Conf. QF, 0-3 (Spartans)	Bob Laforet	Blaic Naysmith
2004	20	8	12	0	151	174	16	2nd of 4 Far West; 8th of 14 Western; 17th of 24 OJBLL	Lost Conf. QF, 0-3 (Mohawks)	Greg Ducharme	Blaic Naysmith
2005	20	11	9	0	173	179	22	1st of 4 Far West; 5th of 14 Western; 11th of 23 OJBLL	Lost Conf. QF, 1-3 (Rebels)	Greg Ducharme	Trevor Veres
2006	20	13	6	1	146	118	27	1st of 4 Far West; 3rd of 14 Western; 8th of 26 OJBLL	Won Conf. QF, 3-1 (Rams); Lost Conf. SF, 2-3 (Thunderhawks)	Greg Ducharme	Trevor Veres
2007	20	13	7	0	202	162	26	1st of 4 Far West; 5th of 14 Western; 9th of 27 OJBLL	Won Conf. QF, 3-1 (Thunderhawks); Won Conf. SF, 3-2 (Mohawks); Lost Conf. Final, 0-3 (Rebels)	Greg Ducharme	Trevor Veres
2008	20	11	8	1	162	144	23	1st of 4 Far West; 4th of 14 Western; 10th of 26 OJBLL	Won Conf. QF, 3-2 (Spartans); Lost Conf. SF, 1-3 (Rebels)	Greg Ducharme	Garrison Matte
2009	20	15	4	1	208	125	31	1st of 4 Far West; 1st of 14 Western; 4th of 26 OJBLL	Lost Conf. QF, 1-3 (North Stars)	Greg Ducharme	Garrison Matte
7 Seasons	140	76	60	4	1251	1134	156	Best: 1st West (2009)	17 wins, 27 losses 305 GF, 398 GA		
Windsor Clippers
2010	20	13	7	0	169	128	26	1st of 4 Far West; 3rd of 14 Western; T-6th of 27 OJBLL	Won Conf. QF, 3-2 (North Stars); Lost Conf. SF, 0-3 (Mohawks)	Greg Ducharme	Garrison Matte
2011	20	11	9	0	259	195	22	1st of 4 Far West; 6th of 13 Western; 12th of 25 OJBLL	Won Conf. QF, 3-1 (Regals); Lost Conf. SF, 0-3 (Rebels)	Greg Ducharme	Jeff Rivait
2012	20	10	10	0	216	207	18	3rd of 4 Far West; 9th of 14 Western; T-14th of 26 OJBLL	DNQ	Greg Ducharme	Jeff Rivait
2013	20	16	4	0	235	173	32	1st of 4 Far West; 3rd of 14 Western; 6th of 26 OJBLL	Won Conf. QF, 2-1 (Blue Devils); Lost Conf. SF, 1-3 (Northmen)	Greg Ducharme	Jeff Rivait
2014	20	17	3	0	267	165	34	1st of 4 Far West; 3rd of 14 Western; T-3rd of 26 OJBLL	Won Conf. QF, 3-2 (Red Devils); Lost Conf. SF, 2-3 (Northmen)	Jerry Kavanaugh	Jarred Riley
2015	20	14	6	0	250	168	28	1st of 4 Far West; 4th of 13 Western; 7th of 25 OJBLL	Won Conf. QF, 3-1 (Mohawks); Lost Conf. SF, 0-3 (Rebels)	Jerry Kavanaugh	Logan Holmes
2016	20	16	4	0	295	138	32	1st of 4 Far West; 2nd of 13 Western; T-3rd of 25 OJBLL	Won Conf. QF, 3-1 (Mohawks); Won Conf. SF, 3-2 (Thunderhawks); Lost Conf. Final, 2-3 (Northmen)	Jerry Kavanaugh	Logan Holmes
2017	20	13	6	1	289	179	27	1st of 4 Far West; 4th of 13 Western; 7th of 25 OJBLL	Won Conf. QF, 3-1 (Red Devils); Lost Conf. SF, 0-3 (Northmen)	Jerry Kavanaugh	Andrew Garant
2018	20	16	4	0	295	138	32	1st of 4 Far West; 3rd of 13 Western; T-4th of 25 OJBLL	Lost Conf. QF, 2-3 (Northmen)	Jerry Kavanaugh	James Morgan
2019	20	13	5	2	207	150	28	1st of 4 Far West; 4th of 13 Western; 6th of 24 OJBLL	Won Conf. QF, 3-0 (Thunderhawks); Lost Conf. SF, 0-3 (Rebels)	Jerry Kavanaugh	Chad Marentette
2020-21	Cancelled due to COVID-19 pandemic										
2022	20	16	4	0	248	135	32	2nd of 11 Western; T-4th of 23 OJBLL	Won Conf. QF, 3-0 (North Stars); Won Conf. SF, 3-2 (Bengals); Won Western Conference, 3-2 (Mohawks); WON MARLENE SOULLIERE TROPHY; Lost OJBLL Final, 0-3 (Knights)	Jerry Kavanaugh	Kaden Brennan
11 Seasons	220	156	61	3	2730	1776	315	Best: 2nd West (2016, 2022)	39 wins, 42 losses 608 GF, 760 GA		
Total; 18 Seasons	360	232	121	7	3981	2910	471	Best: 1st West (2009)	56 wins, 69 losses 1013 GF, 1158 GA		

== Founders Cup ==
CANADIAN NATIONAL CHAMPIONSHIPS

Year	Round Robin	Record W-L-T	Standing	Semifinal	Gold Medal Game
2006; HOST	W, Nova Scotia Knights 20-9; W, Langley Thunder 11-4; W, Edmonton Warriors 11-7; W, ILA All-Stars 12-8	4-0-0	1st of 5 Pool B	W, ILA All-Stars 6-3	L, Oakville Buzz 4-10

== Team awards ==
- Far-West Division Champions: 2005, 2006, 2007, 2008, 2009, 2010, 2011, 2013, 2014, 2015, 2016, 2017, 2018, 2019
- Western Conference Regular Season Champions: 2009
- Marlene Soulliere Trophy Western Conference Playoffs Champions: 2022
- Founders Cup Silver Medallists: 2006

== Individual awards ==
- 2003 OLA Western Rookie of the Year - David Hodgins
- 2004 OLA Western Most Sportsmanlike Player - David Rivait
- 2005 OLA Western Most Valuable Player - David Hodgins
- 2005 OLA Western Scoring Champion - David Hodgins (93 pts)
- 2006 WESPY Male Athlete of the Year Award - David Hodgins
- 2006 CLA Founders Cup All-star team - Jamie Pillon & Matt Soulliere
- 2007 OLA Western Most Sportsmanlike Player - Andrew Ryckman
- 2009 OLA Western Scoring Champion - Brett Hickey (72 pts)
- 2009 OLA Western Coaching Staff of the Year - Greg Ducharme, Ron Martinello, Les Boomer, Eddie McGaffey and company
- 2012 OLA Western Rookie of the Year - Lucas Ducharme
- 2013 CLA Achievement Award - Mike Soulliere (GM & President)
- 2014 OLA Western & League Scoring Champion - Brendon Anger (111 pts)
- 2015 OLA Western Scoring Champion - Logan Holmes (113 pts)
- 2015 OLA Western Most Sportsmanlike Player - Dylan Riley
- 2016 OLA Western & League Scoring Champion - Logan Holmes (145 pts)
- 2017 WESPY Mickey Renaud Captain's Award - Logan Holmes
- 2017 OLA Western & League Scoring Champion - Andrew Garant (146 pts)
- 2018 WESPY Male Athlete of the Year Award - Andrew Garant
- 2018 WESPY Knobby Knudsen Volunteer of the Year Award - Jim Morgan
- 2018 OLA Western & League Scoring Champion - Chase Kavanaugh (122 pts)
- 2018 OLA Western Most Valuable Player - Chase Kavanaugh
- 2018 OLA Western Rookie of the Year - Brayden Mayea
- 2019 OLA Western Rookie of the Year - Zane Dalpe
- 2022 OLA Western Most Valuable Player - Zane Dalpe
- 2022 OLA Best Goaltenders Award - Chase Cosgrove/Griffin Salaris
- 2022 OLA Creator's Game Award - Mike Soulliere (GM & President)

== Professional alumni ==
- Brett Hickey (San Diego Seals)
- Josh Jubenville (Toronto Rock)
- Patrick Kaschalk (Albany FireWolves)
- Kellen LeClair (Calgary Roughnecks)
- Liam LeClair (Calgary Roughnecks)
- Brayden Mayea (Calgary Roughnecks/Carolina Chaos)
- Dylan Riley (Rochester Knighthawks)

== NLL Entry Draft picks ==
- 2011 Brett Hickey 5th Rd - 43rd Overall to Washington Stealth
- 2015 Kellen Leclair 3rd Rd - 25th Overall to Calgary Roughnecks (by way of Six Nations Arrows)
- 2016 Logan Holmes 6th Rd - 52nd Overall to Buffalo Bandits
- 2017 Josh Jubenville 4th Rd - 40th Overall to Toronto Rock (by way of Six Nations Arrows)
- 2017 Andrew Garant 6th Rd - 56th Overall to Vancouver Stealth
- 2018 Dylan Riley - 5th Rd - 62nd Overall to Rochester Knighthawks (by way of Davenport Panthers)
- 2019 Liam Leclair - 1st Rd - 7th Overall to Calgary Roughnecks (by way of Six Nations Arrows)
- 2021 Patrick Kaschalk - 1st Rd - 16th Overall to Albany FireWolves (by way of Burlington Chiefs)
- 2021 Will Cecile - 2nd Rd - 32nd Overall to Georgia Swarm (by way of Burlington Chiefs)
- 2022 Chase Cosgrove - 3rd Rd - 52nd Overall to Vancouver Warriors
- 2024 Brayden Mayea - 1st Rd - 5th Overall to Calgary Roughnecks (by way of High Point Panthers)
- 2025 Seth Martineau - 3rd Rd - 43th Overall to Rochester Knighthawks (by way of Toronto Beaches)
- 2025 Kaden Brennan - 4th Rd - 50th Overall to Philadelphia Wings (by way of St. Bonaventure Bonnies)
- 2025 Zane Dalpe - 5th Rd - 64th Overall to Philadelphia Wings (by way of Lander Bearcats)
- 2026 Calum Brennan - 5th Rd - 59th Overall to Saskatchewan Rush (by way of Robert Morris Colonials)
