= Orangeville Northmen Jr. B =

Canadian box lacrosse team

Orangeville Northmen
- Sport: Box lacrosse
- Founded: 2001
- League: OLA Junior B Lacrosse League
- Based in: Orangeville, Ontario
- Arena: Alder Street Recreation Centre
- Colours: Silver, Black, and White
- Head coach: Brendan Sanderson
- General manager: Ryan Dowdall

The Orangeville Northmen are Junior "B" box lacrosse team from Orangeville, Ontario, Canada. The Northmen play in the OLA Junior B Lacrosse League.

== History ==
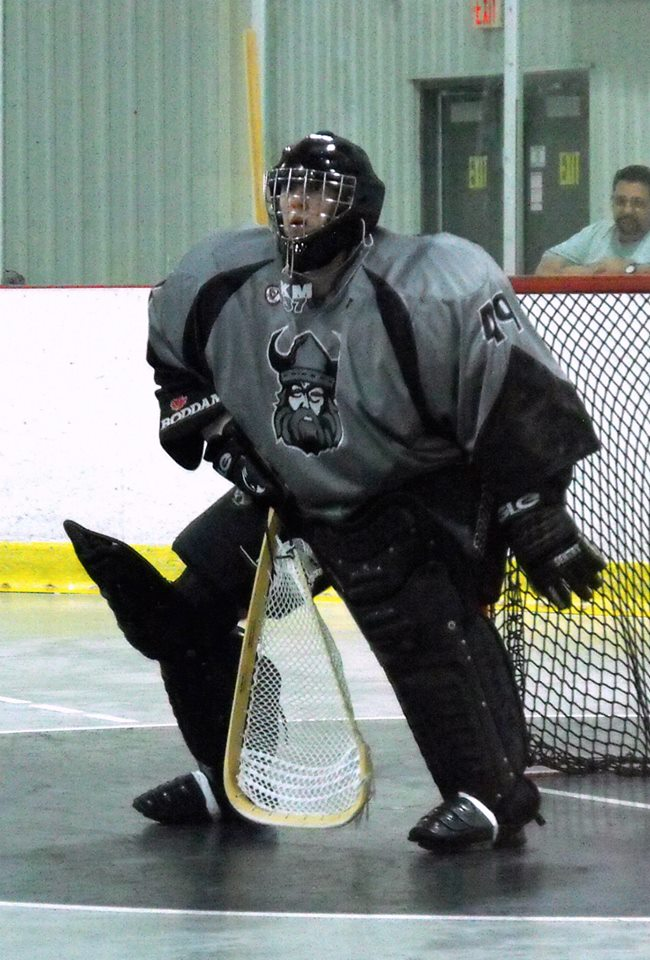
Orangeville Northmen goalie 2014.

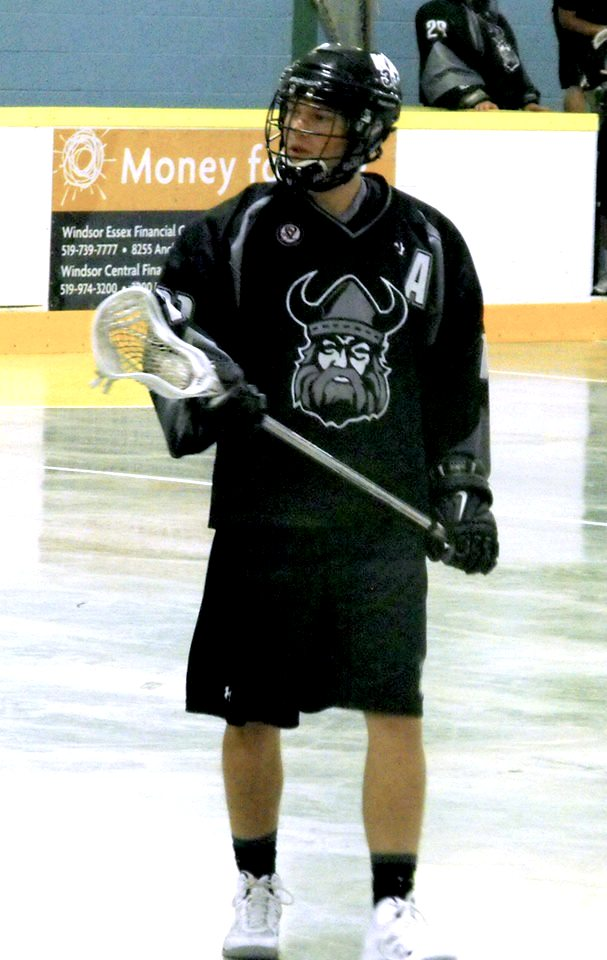
Orangeville Northmen player on the road in 2014.

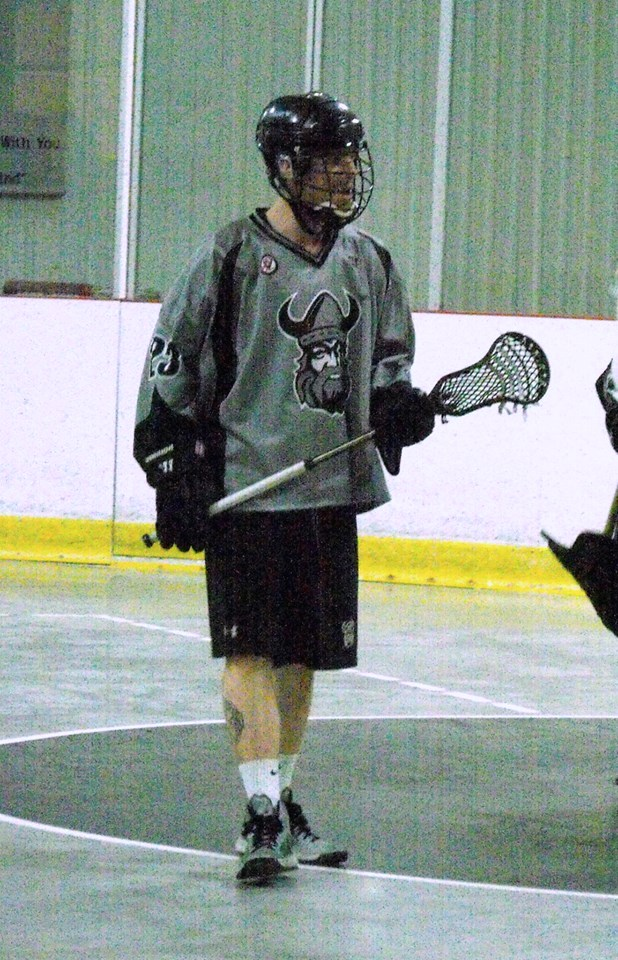
Orangeville Northmen player 2014.

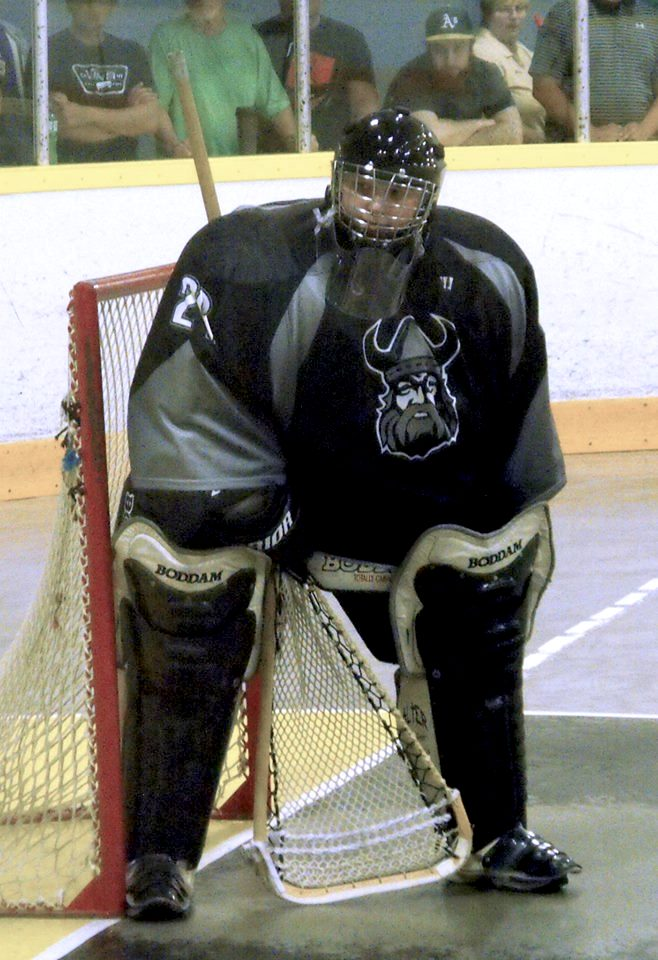
Orangeville Northmen goalie on the road in 2014.

The Junior "B" Northmen were formed in 2001; they are the farm team for the Junior "A" Orangeville Northmen.

2001 - 2015: Since their first season, the Northmen have done quite well, failing to reach the playoffs only once. In the 2006 Playoffs they made the finals. Both the Northmen and their finals opponent, the Oakville Buzz, were founded in 2001. To make the finals, Orangeville beat the Wallaceburg Red Devils 3 games to 0, the St. Catharines Spartans 3 games to 1, and the Niagara Thunderhawks 3 games to 2. The Buzz dispatched the Northmen 3 games to 1 and ended up defeating the Windsor AKO Fratmen in the one-game final for the Founders Cup, 10-4 to win the National Junior "B" title.

2016: The Jr. B Northmen win the J. A. MacDonald Trophy, beating the Clarington Green Gaels 3 games to 0 in the Finals. The Northmen topped Owen Sound, Six Nations and Windsor respectively in the first 3 rounds of the playoffs. Orangeville played host to the 2016 Founders' Cup; both Orangeville and Clarington represented Ontario in the tournament which ran from August 16, 2016 through August 21, 2016. Orangeville would go on to win the Founders' Cup, defeating Clarington 11-6 in the Championship Game. This is Orangeville's first Founders' Cup since the team's return to Jr. B back in 2001.

2017: Back to back League Championships for the Jr. B Northmen, beating the Clarington Green Gaels 3 games to 2 in what could be considered an 'epic series' in Jr. B Finals history. The first three games of the series went to Overtime, seeing the home team win each overtime contest on their home floor. However, in games four and five the Northmen would find their scoring touch, notching 13 goals in each game and outscoring the Gaels 26-13 (in total) en route to their second straight Championship. The Northmen went on to defend their Founders' Cup Championship, winning Gold in Saskatoon, SK.

== Season-by-season results ==
Note: GP = Games played, W = Wins, L = Losses, T = Ties, Pts = Points, GF = Goals for, GA = Goals against

Season	GP	W	L	T	PTS	GF	GA	Placing	Playoffs
2001	20	5	14	1	11	129	198	8th OLA-B West	Lost 1st round
2002	22	16	5	1	33	192	139	4th OLA-B West	Lost 1st round
2003	20	13	6	1	27	171	126	5th OLA-B West	Lost 1st round
2004	20	10	9	1	21	161	151	6th OLA-B West	Lost quarter-final
2005	20	15	4	1	31	170	115	2nd OLA-B West	Lost semi-final
2006	20	16	4	0	32	175	101	1st OLA-B West	Lost final
2007	20	15	5	0	30	160	110	2nd OLA-B West	Lost 1st round
2008	20	13	6	1	27	162	137	4th OLA-B West	Lost Conference Semi-Final
2009	20	9	10	1	19	144	129	9th OLA-B West	DNQ
2010	20	12	7	1	25	159	119	5th OLA-B West	Lost Conference Semi-Final
2011	20	15	5	0	30	236	172	4th OLA-B West	Lost Conference Semi-Final
2012	20	13	7	0	26	260	173	3rd OLA-B West	Lost Conference Semi-Final
2013	20	16	4	0	32	274	179	2nd OLA-B West	Lost Conference Final
2014	20	17	3	0	34	220	122	2nd OLA-B West	Lost Conference Final
2015	20	16	3	1	33	194	121	3rd OLA-B West	Lost semi-final
2016	20	18	2	0	36	199	79	1st OLA-B West	Won League; Won Founders' Cup
2017	20	17	3	0	34	204	106	2nd OLA-B West	Won League; Won Founders' Cup

== Founders Cup ==
CANADIAN NATIONAL CHAMPIONSHIPS

Year	Round Robin	Record W-L-T	Standing	Semifinal	Gold Medal Game
2016; HOST	W, Coquitlam Adanacs 11-4; W, Manitoba Blizzard 9-3; W, Seneca WarChiefs 8-7; W, Saskatchewan SWAT 16-2	4-0-0	1st of 4 Pool B	W, Calgary Chill 9-2	W, Clarington Green Gaels 11-6; CHAMPIONS
2017; Saskatoon, SK	W, Red Deer Rampage 12-6; W, Manitoba Blizzard 12-8; W, Seneca WarChiefs 9-1; W, Saskatchewan SWAT 13-3; W, Coquitlam Adanacs 13-7	5-0-0	1st of 6		W, Red Deer Rampage 18-7; CHAMPIONS
