= Akwesasne Indians =

- Sport: Box lacrosse
- Founded: 1996
- League: OLA Junior B Lacrosse League
- Based in: Akwesasne
- Arena: A'nowara'ko:wa Arena
- Colours: Maroon, Black, and White
- Owner: Carey Terance
- Head coach: Brandon Francic
- General manager: Roy Ledoux
- Championships: Founders Cup (2015)
- Division titles: 4 (2004, 2012, 2015, 2016)

The Akwesasne Indians are Junior "B" box lacrosse team from Akwesasne, a Mohawk community located on the borderlands between Ontario, Quebec, and New York). The Indians compete in the OLA Junior B Lacrosse League.

== History ==
The Akwesasne Lightning joined the OJBLL in 1996. They joined around the same time that the other major Haudenosaunee teams, the Onondaga Warriors and Kahnawake Mohawks, joined the OLA. Onondaga and Kahnawake walked away after a few years in the league to join the Iroquois Nations Junior B Lacrosse League, but Akwesasne decided to stay and have become a top team in the OJBLL.

The team is from the Akwesasne Reserve. The reserve sits on the border between Canada and the United States where Ontario, Quebec, and New York meet. This location is unique as the rest of the teams in the league are based out of Canadian cities and towns.

After a dismal 5-17-0 first season, the Lightning never slipped below a .500 record until 2007. In 2004, the Lightning won their first division title in the Eastern Conference with a 17-1-2 record.

After the 2008 season, the Lightning went on a 1-year hiatus due to a tough economic drop, and not enough money to finance the team. The team returned in 2010.

In 2014, the team changed their name to the Akwesasne Indians.

== Season-by-season results ==
Note: GP = Games played, W = Wins, L = Losses, T = Ties, Pts = Points, GF = Goals for, GA = Goals against

Season	GP	W	L	T	GF	GA	PTS	Placing	Playoffs
1996	22	5	17	0	201	285	10	7th East	DNQ
1997	22	11	11	0	262	259	22	5th East	DNQ
1998	20	15	5	0	303	188	30	2nd East	Lost Quarterfinals
1999	20	10	10	0	232	212	20	4th East	Lost Quarterfinals
2000	20	10	10	0	235	241	20	5th East	DNQ
2001	20	14	6	0	252	171	28	2nd East	Lost 1st Round
2002	22	15	6	1	254	190	31	3rd East	Lost Quarterfinals
2003	20	15	4	1	234	155	31	3rd East	Lost Quarterfinals
2004	20	17	1	2	243	125	36	1st East	Lost Semifinals
2005	20	17	3	0	242	118	34	2nd East	Lost Semifinals
2006	19	14	5	0	195	128	28	3rd East	Lost 1st Round
2007	20	7	13	0	129	189	14	9th East	DNQ
2008	20	9	11	0	148	168	18	8th East	Lost 1st Round
2009	Did Not Participate								
2010	20	6	14	0	105	153	12	9th East	DNQ
2011	20	13	6	1	246	162	27	4th East	Lost Conference Semifinals
2012	20	19	1	0	363	121	39	1st East	Lost Finals, Founders Cup Silver medalist
2013	20	17	3	0	233	137	34	3rd East	Lost Conference Finals
2014	20	16	4	0	230	153	32	3rd East	Lost Conference Finals
2015	20	16	4	0	281	156	32	1st East	Won League, Founders Cup Gold medalist
2016	20	16	4	0	261	169	32	2nd East	TBD

== Founders Cup ==
CANADIAN NATIONAL CHAMPIONSHIPS

Year	Round Robin	Record W-L-T	Standing	Semifinal	Gold Medal Game
2012; Six Nations, ON	W, Onondaga Jr. Redhawks 23-9; W, Saskatchewan SWAT 15-7; W, Team Quebec 23-6; W, Team Quebec 22-4	4-0-0	1st of 4 Pool A	W, Calgary Mountaineers 11-8	L, Six Nations Rebels 7-8
2015; Calgary, AB	W, Manitoba Blizzard 15-5; W, Saskatchewan SWAT 11-10; W, Calgary Chill 23-6; W, Coquitlam Adanacs 18-5; W, Seneca WarChiefs 17-8; W, Calgary Mountaineers 12-7	6-0-0	1st of 7	N/A	W, Seneca WarChiefs 9-6 OT; CHAMPIONS
