= Montreal Junior Lacrosse League =

- Sport: Box Lacrosse
- Founded: 2014
- Folded: 2015
- CEO: Christian Lamothe
- No. of teams: 4
- Country: Canada; United States
- Last champion: Vermont Jr. Voyageurs (2014)

The Montreal Junior Lacrosse League (MJLL) is a Junior B box lacrosse league. The teams are located in Quebec and one in Vermont. The league was formed in 2014 to help fill a void of junior lacrosse in the area.

== History ==
Four teams competed in the inaugural 2014 season, which began in late May. The Vermont Jr. Voyageurs (6-0) finished undefeated in the regular season to earn a playoff bye into the championship series. Second-seed Montreal Shamrocks (4-2) defeated Kanehsatake (2-4) in two-straight games (12-1, 13–3) to advance. In the best-of 3 final, Vermont won Game 1 at home 11–7. Game 2 was played in Montreal, with the Jr. Voyageurs clinching the first-ever MJLL title with an 11–6 victory.

In Winter of 2015 it was announced that three of the four MJLL teams would merge with the Iroquois Nations Junior B Lacrosse League to form a new seven-team league (renamed First Nations Junior B Lacrosse League). On May 16, 2015, the Montreal Shamrocks won the first-ever FNJBLL game, 6–5 over Kanehsatake Warriors. The game was played at Aréna Kevin-Lowe in Lachute, Québec.

== Teams ==
Team	City	Arena
Montreal Jr. Phoenix	Montreal, Quebec	Aréna Bill-Durnan
Montreal Jr. Shamrocks	Montreal, Quebec	Aréna Bill-Durnan
Kanehsatake Jr. Warriors	Deux-Montagnes, Quebec	Olympia Arena
Vermont Jr. Voyageurs	Essex Junction, Vermont	Essex Skating Facility

== Champions ==
- 2014: Vermont Jr. Voyageurs
