= Calgary Mountaineers =

Canadian box lacrosse organization

- Founded: 1970s
- League: Rocky Mountain Lacrosse League
- Based in: Calgary, Alberta
- Arena: Max Bell Centre
- Colours: Black, Silver, Maroon/Blue and White
- Championships: Presidents Cup (1983); Founders Cup (2009)
- Website: Jr. A Mountaineers

The Calgary Mountaineers are a box lacrosse organization based in Calgary, Alberta, Canada. The organization has teams at three levels of the Rocky Mountain Lacrosse League: a Senior B squad, along with a Junior A and Junior B teams.

== Sr. B Mountaineers ==
The Senior Mountaineers have existed for over 30 years, and in 1983, captured the Canadian Senior B championship, the Presidents Cup.

== Jr. A Mountaineers ==
Established in 2006, the Calgary Jr. A Mountaineers are one of four teams in the province at the Junior A level. They were the host team for the 2008 Minto Cup, Canada's national Junior A championship. The tournament was held at the Max Bell Centre in August 2008, won by Orangeville Northmen.

== Jr. B Mountaineers ==
See Calgary Jr. B Mountaineers.
