= Clarington Green Gaels =

Canadian lacrosse team

Green Gaels Junior Lacrosse Club
- Sport: Box lacrosse
- Founded: 1995
- League: OLA Junior B Lacrosse League
- Based in: Bowmanville, Ontario
- Arena: Garnet B. Rickard Recreational Complex
- Colours: Green, Black, and White
- Head coach: Ryan Preston; Brady Kearnan; Ryan Douglas
- General manager: Bryce Dennis

The Green Gaels are a Junior "B" box lacrosse team based in Clarington, Ontario, Canada, that plays out of the Garnet B. Rickard Recreation Complex in Bowmanville, Ontario, Canada. The Gaels play in the OLA Junior B Lacrosse League.

== History ==
=== The early years ===
Founded in 1946 by Jim Bishop, the Green Gaels were a lacrosse team from day one in the OLA Junior A Lacrosse League, playing out of Toronto, Mimico, Huntsville, Oshawa, and currently Bowmanville. In the Gaels first seven seasons in Oshawa, they won the Minto Cup as National Junior "A" Champions. Since the Minto Cup's inception in 1937, no team has ever won more than 4 championship in a row—other than the Gaels. The record setting team were National Champions from 1963 until 1969, a record that has never even been approached since it was set.

In the 1963 Minto Cup, the Gaels won the National title by defeating the Victoria Shamrocks 4 games to 2. In 1964, to win the Minto they defeated the New Westminster Salmonbellies 4 games to 1. In 1965, they beat New Westminster again, 4 games to 2, to win the Minto Cup. In 1966, they beat New Westminster, yet again, 4 games to 2 to win the National title. They beat New Westminster a third and fourth straight time for the title in 1967 and 1968. In 1969, the Gaels finally got to beat someone else for the Minto Cup again, facing the South Vancouver Legion and sweeping them 4 games to none. The streak was stopped dead in the 1970 season. The Lakeshore Maple Leafs defeated the Gaels 4 games to 1 in the Ontario semi-final.

The 1963-1969 teams were collectively inducted into the Canadian Lacrosse Hall of Fame in 2000. During this stretch, they won 220 games and seven straight Minto Cups. The Green Gaels played OLA Junior A Lacrosse until 1983 when they folded operations after 21 years in the league. They did not win another Minto Cup since winning their seventh straight title.

=== Rebirth ===
The Gaels applied for re-entry into the OLA in 1995 and were placed in Junior "B". Since this time, the team moved to Clarington in 1997, and have yet to have a losing season. In 1999, the Gaels even had a perfect season. However, in the end they lost in the Canadian Semi final. Remarkably though, between 1998 and 2004 the Gaels won 2 Provincial titles (2000, 2004) and 4 Founders Cups (1998, 2000, 2002, 2004) as National Champions.

The 1998 Founders Cup championship team was inducted into the Clarington sports hall of fame on October 20, 2012.

== 2000 Founders cup team ==
The beginning of the year 2000 was a tough one to read for any outsider. Many believed that this was a rebuilding year for the Gaels having had 12 rookies join the team. After falling short in the Founders cup tournament the year before (winning bronze over Elora) and having 2 of the top 3 point getters leaving due to being overage, many had the Gaels finishing in the bottom half of the Eastern conference. The Gaels finished the season with a 19-1 record losing their 3rd game of the year with 3 seconds left in o.t. to a formidable Nepean Knights team. From that point on the Gaels never looked back finishing undefeated heading into the playoffs. 1st round vs Scarborough The Gaels won 3 straight games by scores of 9-5, 13-4 and an unbelievable 12-0 leading them to play the only team to hand them a loss in the regular season the Nepean Knights. 2nd round vs Nepean Nepean was favored by many as the team to beat after stunning Onondaga in the first round leading them to play the Gaels. But the Gaels proved to be too skilled for the Knights as Clarington beat them 3 games straight by scores of 14-6, 8-5, and 9-5. Setting up a rematch from the year before with the defending Ontario cup champion Elora Mohawks. 3rd round vs Elora The rematch was set. Elora vs the Green Gaels in a matchup of 2 powerhouse teams that dominated the Jr. B loop for the past 2 seasons. Although both teams were secured to play in the Founders Cup tournament, (Clarington being the host team and Elora being the Ontario representative) they did not hold anything back playing what some have said as the best lacrosse games in years.

Game 1 was a tight affair with the Gaels pulling out a 9-8 double overtime win at home.

Game 2 was held in Elora and the Mohawks took advantage of home floor winning 9-7.

Game 3 was back in Clarington and the Gaels continued their home floor dominance winning 10-7.

Game 4 was a heated affair in Elora with both teams losing 5 players each during a brawl in which the refs threw all players on the floor off for the night in the 2nd period. The gaels were leading at that point but Elora dug deep and pulled out the 7-6 win evening up the series @ 2-2.

Game 5 was again in Clarington and the Gaels again won @ home by a score of 8-7.

Game 6 was a chance for Gaels to close out the series in Elora and that is exactly what they did winning 11-10 in overtime on Josh Colley's goal with limited time remaining, giving the Green Gaels the Ontario Cup (their first Ontario cup since reforming in 1995).

Founders Cup final game The Gaels continued their home floor dominance winning every game of the Founders tournament and setting up a date with the I.L.A. in the final game. This game was one for the ages as the ILA dominated the first period by a score of 5-0. The fans in the building in Clarington were silent and things looked bleak, but the Gaels scored 5 goals in the second narrowing the gap to 6-5. The third period was a different story than the first as the Green Gaels held the ILA scoreless and scored 3 goals winning the game and the Founders Cup by a final score of 8-6. Giving the Green Gaels 2 Canadian championships in 3 years.

On October 25, 2015 the 2000 Green Gael team was inducted into the Clarington Sports Hall of Fame.

== 2002 Playoff run ==
In 2002, even though the Gaels finished first in their division, they were in for a rough ride as both the Barrie Tornado and the scrappy Mimico Mountaineers waited, not to mention the 18-3 Onondaga Redhawks in the Far East Division.

Round One had the Gaels face off against the Mimico Mounties. The series was end to end, both physically and mentally exhausting. Neither team scored in double digits in the series. It took a game 5 to decide this series and the Gaels moved on.

The Barrie Tornado were the opponents in Round two. The Tornado who had upset the Gaels in 2001 were out to prove a point, while the Gaels had a measure of revenge on their mind. In the first game, the Gaels offense completely disappeared while the Barrie defence was strong in a 4-2 Tornado victory. The Gaels would win the next two games with offensive domination outscoring Barrie 28-12. The Tornado wouldn't give up though winning game 4, 6-4 to force a 5th and deciding game. In another back and forth affair, the Gaels prevailed, 10–8.

This put the Gaels in the unenviable task of facing the highly touted Onondaga Redhawks. Onondaga, for financial reasons, and the hopes they could win in three straight games, decided to take the first two games at home. That meant, even though the Gaels had finished second in the conference, that they would retain home floor advantage if the series went five games.

Onondaga defeated the Gaels in the first two games by scores of 13-5, and 12-3. Many, many people thought the series would be over, including Brad Kelly of the Oshawa This Week.

With five days off between games, the Gaels practiced hard, knowing full well, one win might get them back into the series.

Game 3 went to the Gaels in a defensive battle holding high scorers Pete Benedict, AJ, Brett, and Drew Bucktooth to only three goals, defeating the Redhawks 11-7. In game 4 of the series, it was more of the same with the Gaels holding the Redhawks down winning 8-6.

Was it mentioned that the Redhawks neglected to book lodging anywhere and had to travel to Mississauga Friday evening, and to the Dynasty Inn, in Oshawa the second night? Talk about being overconfident.

Game 5 was for all the marbles. With the Redhawks leading 5-2 late in the third, the Gaels mounted a surge. The Gaels scored 4 powerplay markers to go up 6-5. After Onondaga tied the game 6-6, it all came down to the final two possessions. With 18 seconds left, veteran Green Gael James Hinkson took a pass in front of the redhawks tender and found twine to go up 7-6. A battle for the face-off ensued with the Redhawks finally gaining possession with two seconds left. Game over, Gaels win and move onto the Ontario Finals, and more importantly, the Founders Cup.

=== 2002 Ontario Finals ===
The Gaels faced league best Spartan with the Warriors defeating the Gaels 3-0. Although the Gaels generated some quality chances, it was insufficient; resting some players, and getting ready for the big dance seemed more important.

=== 2002 Founders Cup ===
In game one, the Gaels faced the New Westminster Salmonbellies. Simply put, the Gaels were dominant, to the tune of a 16-2 beating. Game 2 featured the Gaels against the Edmonton Miners. The Gaels beat the Miners 8-5. Game three was against the Winnipeg Warhawks with the Gaels prevailing yet again 16-2.

The semis pitted the Gaels against the host Halton Hills Bulldogs. The Gaels won 7-5 in overtime against a determined Dogs team. This launched the Gaels into the final against the Spartan Warriors.

In the end of a tightly fought game, Doug Trudeau came through for the green, scoring the winner with 50 seconds remaining in the third period. The Gaels, by virtue of their 7-6 victory, were crowned Canadian Champs.

=== 2004 Playoff run ===
After finishing the 2004 season second in the Eastern Conference with a 14–5–1 record, the Gaels were poised to do well in the playoffs. In the first round of the playoffs, the Gaels took out the Markham Ironheads in three straight games. In the quarter-finals, the Gaels faced the Mimico Mountaineers. The Gaels walked through them, beating them 3 games to 1. The Gaels then took on the first seed Akwesasne Lightning in the Conference final. The Lightning finished the season 17-1-2 and were thought to have the best chance for a Founders Cup run. In the next three games, the Gaels beat the Lightning 10-7, 7-6, and 13-9 to sweep them and earn a berth into the League Final to face the Elora Mohawks.

The Western Champion Mohawks had finished the season 17-3-0 and were the hosts for the 2004 Founder Cup. The Mohawks came into the Final flying, blowing out the Gaels 16-4. In game two, the Gaels evened the score winning a 9–8 contest. Elora came out hungry in game three, looking to crush the Gaels. That they did, beating Clarington by a score of 12-1. It looked over for the Gaels, down 2 games to 1 in a best-of-five series and having suffered two demoralizing losses. Game four stayed close like game two, and the Gaels forced overtime. The Gaels pulled it together and scored to win and force a final game five. In the winner-take-all game, the Gaels came out flying and beat Elora 10-7 to win the Ontario Junior "B" title and earn a berth to the Founders Cup in Elora, Ontario.

The Founders Cup tournament started on August 21, 2004, and the first game for the Gaels put them up against the Moose Jaw Mustangs. The Gaels beat them 13-5. The next morning the Gaels beat the Manitoba Buffalo by a score of 12-2. That evening, the Edmonton Warriors challenged the Gaels, but came up short as the Gaels won 11-9. The next night, to close out the round robin, the Gaels beat the all-stars from the Iroquois Lacrosse Association 11-7 to finish in first place in their pool.

On August 24, the Gaels faced the Delta Islanders from British Columbia for the crossover semi-final. The Gaels crushed them 18-3. On the other side, the Elora Mohawks beat the ILA All-Stars 14-8 for the winner-take-all All-Ontario Final.

Despite the abilities of Mohawks, the Gaels beat the host Mohawks, 11-8, to win their fourth Founders Cup in seven years.

== Season-by-season results ==
Note: GP = Games played, W = Wins, L = Losses, T = Ties, Pts = Points, GF = Goals for, GA = Goals against

Season	GP	W	L	T	GF	GA	PTS	Placing	Playoffs
1995	22	15	7	0	288	206	30	1st OJBLL East	Lost semi-final
1996	22	16	6	0	267	202	32	3rd OJBLL East	Lost semi-final
1997	22	16	6	0	267	174	32	3rd OJBLL East	Lost semi-final
1998	20	15	5	0	237	132	30	3rd OJBLL East	Lost OJBLL Final, won Founders Cup
1999	20	20	0	0	300	98	40	1st OJBLL East	Lost OJBLL Final, 3rd at Founders Cup
2000	20	19	1	0	273	125	38	1st OJBLL East	Won OJBLL Final, won Founders Cup
2001	20	14	6	0	192	135	28	3rd OJBLL East	Lost 1st round
2002	22	16	5	1	245	132	33	2nd OJBLL East	Lost OJBLL Final, won Founders Cup
2003	20	11	8	1	179	157	23	6th OJBLL East	Lost 1st round
2004	20	14	5	1	240	146	29	2nd OJBLL East	Won OJBLL Final, won Founders Cup
2005	20	16	4	0	225	95	32	3rd OJBLL East	Lost Eastern Conference QF
2006	20	14	6	0	179	149	28	5th OJBLL East	Lost Eastern Conference QF
2007	20	20	0	0	237	110	40	1st OJBLL East	Lost OJBLL Final
2008	20	17	3	0	232	134	34	2nd OJBLL East	Lost Eastern Conference SF
2009	20	19	1	0	260	71	38	1st OJBLL East	Won OJBLL, lost Founders Cup Final
2010	20	20	0	0	243	77	40	1st OJBLL East	Lost Eastern Conference Final
2011	20	19	1	0	314	110	38	1st OJBLL East	Lost Eastern Conference Final
2012	20	17	1	2	296	118	36	2nd OJBLL East	Lost Eastern Conference Final
2013	20	18	1	1	285	127	37	1st OJBLL East	Lost OJBLL final
2014	20	17	3	0	249	131	34	1st OJBLL East	Lost Eastern Conference SF
2015	20	18	2	0	249	128	36	1st OJBLL East	Lost Eastern Conference SF
2016	20	19	1	0	253	139	38	1st OJBLL East	Lost OJBLL Final; Lost Founders Final
2017	20	17	3	0	260	118	34	1st OJBLL East	Lost OJBLL final
2018	20	18	2	0	256	122	36	1st OJBLL East	Lost OJBLL final
2019	20	19	1	0	273	118	38	2nd OJBLL East	Lost Eastern Conference QF
2020	No season due to COVID-19 Pandemic								
2021	No season due to COVID-19 Pandemic								
2022	20	13	5	2	175	144	28	4th OJBLL East	Lost Eastern Conference SF
2023	20	11	8	1	193	162	23	4th OJBLL East	Lost Eastern Conference QF
2024	20	14	6	0	212	150	28	4th OJBLL East	Lost Eastern Conference QF

=== Junior A Franchise ===
Season	GP	W	L	T	GF	GA	PTS	Placing	Playoffs
1963	24	17	7	0	300	229	34	3rd OLA-A	Won League, won Minto Cup
1964	24	20	4	0	367	225	40	1st OLA-A	Won League, won Minto Cup
1965	20	18	1	1	401	161	37	1st OLA-A	Won League, won Minto Cup
1966	24	23	1	0	438	165	46	1st OLA-A	Won League, won Minto Cup
1967	24	23	1	0	467	173	46	1st OLA-A	Won League, won Minto Cup
1968	24	24	0	0	483	189	48	1st OLA-A	Won League, won Minto Cup
1969	24	22	2	0	571	239	44	1st OLA-A	Won League, won Minto Cup
1970	28	16	12	0	464	359	32	3rd OLA-A	Lost semi-final
1971	30	22	8	0	467	368	44	1st OLA-A	Lost semi-final
1972	28	11	17	0	349	364	22	5th OLA-A	Lost League Final
1973	28	6	22	0	314	413	12	8th OLA-A	DNQ
1974	28	12	16	0	383	389	24	4th OLA-A	Lost semi-final
1975	28	11	16	1	331	390	23	6th OLA-A	Lost quarter-final
1976	26	9	17	0	338	393	18	4th OLA-A East	Lost quarter-final
1977	22	14	7	1	304	256	29	5th OLA-A	Lost quarter-final
1978	30	20	10	0	508	402	40	3rd OLA-A East	Lost quarter-final
1979	28	23	5	0	597	373	46	1st OLA-A East	Lost League Final
1980	20	15	5	0	431	228	30	2nd OLA-A	Lost semi-final
1981	20	9	11	0	323	275	18	5th OLA-A	Lost League Final
1982	20	15	5	0	302	209	30	3rd OLA-A	Lost League Final
1983	22	11	11	0	244	217	22	4th OLA-A	Lost semi-final

== Founders Cup ==
CANADIAN NATIONAL CHAMPIONSHIPS

Year	Round Robin	Record W-L-T	Standing	Semifinal	Gold Medal Game
2009; Edmonton, AB	W, Edmonton Warriors 12-5; W, Port Moody Thunder 16-6; W, Calgary Mountaineers 10-6; W, Onondaga Jr. Redhawks 12-2	4-0-0	1st of 4 Pool B	W, Edmonton Warriors 9-5	L, Calgary Mountaineers 4-8
