= Calgary Jr. A Mountaineers =

Jr.A Mountaineers
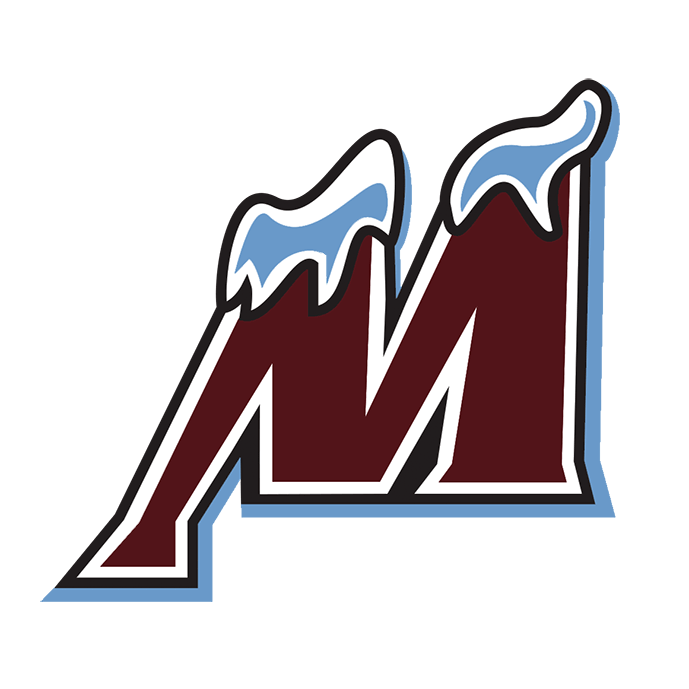
- Founded: 2006
- League: Rocky Mountain Lacrosse League
- Based in: Calgary, Alberta
- Arena: Stu Peppard
- Colours: Maroon, Blue and White
- Head coach: Cody Hawkins
- General manager: Shawn Wasson
- Championships: 2012 Alberta Champs
- Website: jramounties.com

The Junior A Mountaineers Lacrosse Club was established in 2006 as an expansion team to the Rocky Mountain Lacrosse League (RMLL) Junior A program bringing the total number of Junior A lacrosse teams in Alberta to four. Playing out of Calgary, the Mounties home rink is Stu Peppard. The Mounties have played in 2 Minto Cup Championships, once being hosted in 2008 at Max Bell Arena

The Jr.A Mountaineers were the 2012 Alberta Champions and were one of the only Alberta based teams to reach the Semi-Finals in the Minto Cup. They did so in 2008 and lost to the Victoria Jr.A Shamrocks with the Orangeville Northmen eventually winning the Championship.

The Mountaineers have also built their NCAA and college player recruits since their inception in 2006. Below is a list of all former Alumni and current players who have played collegiate level lacrosse.

Player	School	League
Dan Taylor	Lehigh	NCAA Div 1
Tyler Melnyk	Marquette	NCAA Div 1
Cam Gardner	Bellarmine	NCAA Div 1
Matt Melnyk	Marquette	NCAA Div 1
Andrew Smistad	Marquette	NCAA Div 1
Kyle McFadyen	Carleton University	CUFLA
James Raveret	Marquette	NCAA Div 1
Jordan Prysko	North Carolina	NCAA Div 1
Derek Lloyd	Stony Brook University	NCAA Div 1
Cody Graden	Merrimack	NCAA Div 2
Dan Farmer	Mars Hill	NCAA Div 2
Tyler Farmer	Mars Hill	NCAA Div 2
Brandon Miller	Notre Dame Du Namur	NCAA Div 2
Lucas Claude	Florida Southern College	NCAA Div 2
Curtis Pridham	Concordia Wisconsin	NCAA Div 3
Cody Chassels	Concordia Wisconsin	NCAA Div 3
Shawn Teixeira	La Roche	NCAA Div 3
Tom Acton	Carleton University	CUFLA
Cameron McIntosh	Simon Fraser	MCLA
Sheldon Locking	Mcgill	CUFLA
Ian McShane	St. Francis Xavier University	MUFLL
Wes Gardner	Dalhousie	MUFLL
