= Calgary Jr. B Mountaineers =

Canadian box lacrosse organization

- Founded: 1990s
- League: Rocky Mountain Lacrosse League
- Based in: Calgary, Alberta
- Colours: Black, Silver, Maroon/Blue and White
- Head coach: Sean Tyrell
- Championships: 2000, 2004, 2007, 2008, 2009, 2010, 2011, 2012, 2013 RMLL & 2009 Founders Cup
- Website: Jr B Mountaineers

The Calgary Mountaineers are a box lacrosse organization based out of Calgary, Alberta, Canada. The organization represents teams at three levels of the Rocky Mountain Lacrosse League: a Senior B squad, along with a Junior A team and a Junior B team.

== History ==
The Junior B Mountaineers were created in the late 1990s, and have won the Alberta Provincial Championship in 2000, 2004, 2007, 2008, 2009, 2010, 2011, 2012 and 2013.

In the 2009 season, the Mounties finished the regular season first overall in Alberta with a nearly unfettered record of 19–1. On August 22, 2009, the Junior B Mountaineers doing what only two non-Ontarian teams have done before upset the OLA Junior B Lacrosse League's Clarington Green Gaels 8–4 to win Alberta's first Founders Cup since 1999, finishing the season with an overall record of 29–3.

== Founders Cup ==
CANADIAN NATIONAL CHAMPIONSHIPS

Year	Round Robin	Record W-L-T	Standing	Quarter-final	Semifinal	Bronze Medal Game	Gold Medal Game
2000; Bowmanville, ON	L, Iroquois Nation 4-19	3-2-0	?		L, Clarington Green Gaels ?-?	L, Elora Mohawks ?-?	
2004; Elora, ON	L, Delta Islanders 6-7; W, Saskatoon Smash 22-4; W, Sherbrooke Extreme 18-1; L, Elora Mohawks 4-11	2-2-0	3rd of 5 Black Division	N/A	W, Iroquois Nation 14-8 (Tier II Semifinal)	W, Manitoba Buffalo 7-4 (Tier II Final)	N/A
2007; Kamloops, BC	L, Iroquois Nation 9-12; OTW, Calgary Shamrocks 6-5; W, Saskatoon SWAT 8-2; L, Coquitlam Adanacs 4-6	2-2-0	3rd of 5 Pool B	W, Kamloops Venom 11-4	L, Coquitlam Adanacs 3-7	L, Calgary Shamrocks 5-6	N/A
2008; Guelph, ON	W, Calgary Chill 16-3; W, Port Coquitlam Saints 9-4; W, Longueuil Patriotes 10-5; L, Six Nations Rebels 3-9; W, Saskatoon SWAT 8-4	4-1-0	2nd of 6 Pool B	L, Iroquois Nation 4-9	N/A	N/A	N/A
2009; Edmonton, AB	W, Red Deer Rampage 14-4; W, Winnipeg Gryphons 21-6; L, Clarington Green Gaels 6-10; W, Saskatchewan SWAT 10-2	3-1-0	1st of 4 Pool A	N/A	W, Red Deer Rampage 8-5	N/A	W, Clarington Green Gaels 8-4; CHAMPIONS
2010; Etobicoke, ON	W, Moncton Mavericks 22-1; W, Saskatchewan SWAT 13-4; L, Halton Hills Bulldogs 3-7; W, Winnipeg Gryphons 16-4; W, Onondaga Jr. Redhawks 16-9	4-1-0	2nd of 6 Barb Cormier Division	W, Edmonton Warriors 7-3	L, Mimico Mountaineers 5-8	L, Kamloops Venom 3-8	N/A
2011; Saskatoon, SK	L, Six Nations Rebels 11-14; W, Saskatchewan Selects 21-4; W, Saskatchewan SWAT 11-10; W, Winnipeg Gryphons 12-7; W, Montreal Phoenix 14-0	4-1-0	2nd of 6	N/A	N/A	N/A	L, Six Nations Rebels 11-14
2012; Hagersville, ON	W, Team Nova Scotia 10-8; W, Kamloops Venom 14-4; W, Manitoba Gryphons 16-8; T, Six Nations Rebels 6-6	3-0-1	Tied-1st of 5 Group B	N/A	L, Akwesasne Indians 8-11	W, Onondaga Jr. Redhawks 17-11	N/A
2013; Winnipeg, MB	L, Six Nations Rebels 7-16; W, Manitoba Selects 19-11; W, Team Nova Scotia 12-7	2-1-0	2nd of 4 Pool B	W, Saskatoon SWAT 20-2	W, Team Nova Scotia 15-10	N/A	L, Six Nations Rebels 12-17
