= First Nations Lacrosse Association =

Sports governing body

- Sport: Lacrosse
- Jurisdiction: Regional
- Abbreviation: FNLA
- Founded: 1983
- Affiliation: Lacrosse Canada
- Affiliation date: 1988
- Headquarters: Akwesasne, New York
- President: James Rickard

Official website
- firstnationslacrosse.com
- (Haudenosaunee)

First Nations Lacrosse Association (FNLA; formerly Iroquois Lacrosse Association) is a member of Lacrosse Canada with associations in both Canada and the United States centred in Native American Communities.

In addition to youth associations, the FNLA also sanctions three men's box lacrosse leagues: Can-Am Senior B Lacrosse League, Three Nations Senior Lacrosse League, and First Nations Junior B Lacrosse League.

The FNLA does not oversee the five Haudenosaunee Nationals international teams, the Haudenosaunee men's national lacrosse team, the Haudenosaunee men's national under-19 lacrosse team, the Haudenosaunee women's national lacrosse team, the Haudenosaunee women's national under-19 lacrosse team, and the Haudenosaunee national indoor lacrosse team. These teams are recognized by World Lacrosse for international competition, making them the only indigenous peoples' national teams sanctioned in any sport.

== Leagues ==
- Can-Am Senior B Lacrosse League, founded in 1969 as North American Lacrosse Association, was organized beginning in 1978. League winners compete for the Presidents Cup, the Senior B championship of North America. Can-Am teams have won the championship five times (1994, 1996, 2000, 2010, 2014).
- Formed in 1994, the Three Nations Senior Lacrosse League is a Senior B box lacrosse league. TNSLL teams compete for the Presidents Cup, winning the championship on five occasions (1994, 1995, 1997, 2011, 2012).
- First Nations Junior B Lacrosse League is a box lacrosse league formed in 2014 with the restructuring of the Canadian Lacrosse Association. Four teams competed in the inaugural season. In 2015 the league merged with the Montreal Junior Lacrosse League to form a seven-team league. The FNLA league winner earns a spot in the Founders Cup, the national championship of Junior B lacrosse in Canada.

== Haudenosaunee Nationals ==
The Iroquois Nationals men's lacrosse team was formed and sanctioned by the Grand Council of the Haudenosaunee in 1983 in preparation of friendlies at the NCAA championship in Baltimore, Maryland. The Nationals lost to Syracuse Orange 28-5 and Hobart College 22–14. Prior to the 1984 Summer Olympics, the Nationals held the Jim Thorpe Memorial Games and Pow-Wow, a 6-team event with local and international teams in Los Angeles. The Nationals achieved their first victory over the national team of England. The following year, using their Haudenosaunee passports, the Nationals traveled and toured England losing only once.

After being denied membership by the ILF to compete in the 1986 World Games in Canada, the Iroquois hosted the teams for preliminary games at the University of Buffalo. In 1988, the IFL accepted the Iroquois as a full member nation.

The Iroquois Nationals took part in their first international competition at the 1990 World Lacrosse Championships, finishing fifth. The first FIL sanctioned U17 box lacrosse friendly took place between the Iroquois Nationals and Team Canada during the 2015 World Indoor Lacrosse Championship.

=== Nike deal ===
In 2006, the Iroquois Nationals Lacrosse Program signed a partnership with Nike, Inc. in which Nike will provide the Nationals with their brand uniforms, clothing, footwear, and other equipment. The company is to develop programs to "promote wellness-and-fitness activities in Native American communities throughout the region", and team members may go to speak to local groups. Team members will also assist in testing of sustainable produced sportswear for Nike's research and development of processes to use non-toxic dyes and biodegradable organic cotton.

Nike is the only Fortune 500 company to have such a relationship with a Native American organization, and the Iroquois Nationals are the only such group.

=== Passport issues ===
The Nationals were unable to attend and compete in the 2010 World Lacrosse Championship in England as the United Kingdom does not accept their Iroquois passports. The Nationals were forced to forfeit their three preliminary games. In 2015, the Haudenosaunee Nationals women's under 19 team was forced to withdraw from the 2015 U19 World Lacrosse Championship in Scotland for the same reason.

=== Name change ===
In 2022, the team formally changed their name from the Iroquois Nationals to the Haudenosaunee Nationals, citing their desire to use the endonym for their people rather than an exonym used historically by enemy tribes and European colonists.

=== Field lacrosse ===
The Haudenosaunee Nationals are the national team representing the Haudenosaunee Confederacy. First recognized by the Federation of International Lacrosse as a full member nation in 1987, the Nationals competed in their first tournament at the 1990 World Lacrosse Championship, finishing fifth.

Awards
Event	Member	Award
2002 World Championships	Neal Powless	All World Team
2006 World Championships	Brent Bucktooth	All World Team
2008 U19 World Championships	Emmett Printup	All World Team - Attack
2008 U19 World Championships	Jason Johns	All World Team - Defense
2012 U19 World Championships	Seth Oakes	All World Team - Attack
2012 U19 World Championships	Lyle Thompson	All World Team - Midfield
2012 U19 World Championships	Warren Hill	All World Team - Goalie
2014 World Championships	Lyle Thompson	All World Team - Attack
2014 World Championships	Jeremy Thompson	All World Team - Midfield
2016 U19 World Championships	Tehoka Nanticoke	Attack MVP
2016 U19 World Championships	Tehoka Nanticoke	All World Team - Attack
2016 U19 World Championships	Austin Staats	All World Team - Attack

==== Results ====
Year	Competition	Result	Notes
1990	World Lacrosse Championship	5th	
1994	World Lacrosse Championship	5th	
1998	World Lacrosse Championship	4th	
2002	World Lacrosse Championship	4th	
2006	World Lacrosse Championship	4th	
2010	World Lacrosse Championship	DNP	Passport controversy
2014	World Lacrosse Championship	Bronze	
2018	World Lacrosse Championship	Bronze	Passport delay

=== Box lacrosse ===
World Indoor Lacrosse Championship
Year	GP	W	L	GF	GA	Final	Finish
2003 Canada	7	5	2	126	81	Lost to Canada 21-4	2nd place, silver medalist(s)
2007 Canada	5	4	1	98	35	Lost to Canada 15-14 (OT)	2nd place, silver medalist(s)
2011 Czech Republic	5	4	1	84	37	Lost to Canada 13-6	2nd place, silver medalist(s)
2015 Onondaga Nation	6	4	2	84	48	Lost to Canada 12-8	2nd place, silver medalist(s)
Totals	23	17	6	392	201	4 Silver Medals	

==== 2015 WILC ====
The Iroquois Nationals played host to the 2015 FIL World Indoor Lacrosse Championships for the first time in the tournament's history. The event took place on Haudenosaunee Territories at Tsha’Hon’nonyen’dakhwa’ Onondaga Nation Arena and the Carrier Dome near Syracuse, as well as the First Niagara Center in Buffalo September 18–27, 2015.

== See also ==
- Mike Kanentakeron Mitchell, Iroquois Lacrosse Association founder
