= 2014 Presidents Cup (box lacrosse) =

The 2014 Presidents Cup is the National Senior "B" Championship of Canada. This year's tournament is being hosted by the Tri-City Bandits and the West Coast Senior Lacrosse Association. The Senior B national championship will be played at the Poirier Sport & Leisure Complex in Coquitlam, British Columbia.

One team enters the tournament after an undefeated season; St. Albert Miners. After a perfect 16–0 regular season, the Miners swept their way to a Rocky Mountain Lacrosse League championship.

== Event ==
On opening day, the second game of the tournament involving the St. Albert Miners and Akwesasne Outlawz was cancelled due to a lack of eligible players. St. Albert was declared winner by forfeit, 1–0. All players attending the event were required by the Canadian Lacrosse Association to complete an online course designed by the Canadian Centre for Ethics in Sport in order to compete.

== Teams ==
Rank	Team	League	W-L-T-OTL	GF–GA	Pts
1	x-Kahnawake Mohawks	QSLL	5-1-0	64-50	10
2	x-Onondaga Redhawks	Can-Am	5-1-0	71-45	10
3	x-St. Albert Miners	RMLL	4-2-0	51-36	8
4	x-Six Nations Rivermen	OSBLL	4-2-0	60-52	8
5	Nanaimo Timbermen	WCSLA	2-4-0	39-63	4
6	Tri-City Bandits	Host (WCSLA)	1-5-0	51-48	2
7	Akwesasne Outlawz	TNSLL	0-6-0	31-73	0

(x) denotes a berth into the semifinals.

=== Schedule/Results ===
August 25

Kahnawake 8 - Tri-City 7
St. Albert 1 - Akwesasne 0 (forfeit)
Onondaga 14 - Six Nations 12
Nanaimo 8 - Tri-City 5

August 26

Six Nations 8 - St. Albert 10
Kahnawake 14 - Nanaimo 10
Akwesasne 7 - Onondaga 16
Tri-City 6 - St. Albert 8

August 27

Onondaga 10 - Kahnawake 11
Nanaimo 6 - St. Albert 20
Six Nations 9 - Kahnawake 8
Onondaga 11 - Tri-City 6
Nanaimo 8 - Akwesasne 3

August 28

Kahnawake 14 - Akwesasne 8
Six Nations 8 - Nanaimo 4
Onondaga 7 - St. Albert 6
Akwesasne 4 - Tri-City 20

August 29

Nanaimo 3 - Onondaga 13
Six Nations 14 - Akwesasne 9
St. Albert 6 - Kahnawake 9
Tri-City 7 - Six Nations 9

August 30

Semifinal: Kahnawake Mohawks 4, Six Nations Rivermen 8
Semifinal: Onondaga Redhawks 10, St. Albert Miners 8

August 31

Bronze Medal Game: Kahnawake Mohawks 5 - St. Albert Miners 7
Gold Medal Game: Onondaga Redhawks 9 - Six Nations Rivermen 7

== Awards ==
- Most Valuable Player: Lyle Thompson (Onondaga Redhawks)
- First Team All-Stars

- Goalie: Warren Hill, Six Nations
- Defence: John Lintz, St. Albert; Jeremy Thompson, Onondaga
- Offence: Nate Schmidt, St. Albert; Lyle Thompson, Onondaga; Caleb Wiles, Kahnawake

- Second Team All-Stars

- Goalie: Dave Marrese, St. Albert
- Defence: Richard Cambrey, Tri-City; Jordan Cornfield, St. Albert
- Offence: Steve Higgs, Nanaimo; Peter Jacobs, Kahnawake; Wayne VanEvery, Six Nations
