= Six Nations Rebels =

Canadian junior lacrosse team

- Sport: Box lacrosse
- Founded: 1996
- League: OLA Junior B Lacrosse League
- Team history: 1996-2001: Six Nations Red Rebels; 2002-Present: Six Nations Rebels
- Based in: Hagersville, Ontario on the Six Nations of the Grand River Reserve
- Arena: Iroquois Lacrosse Arena
- Colours: Orange, Black, and White
- Head coach: Jason Johnson
- General manager: Wray Maracle
- Championships: Founders Cup wins: 1997, 2007, 2008, 2011, 2012, 2013, 2014; Ontario Titles: 1998, 2007, 2008, 2011, 2012, 2013, 2014, 2019

The Six Nations Rebels are a Canadian Junior "B" box lacrosse team from Hagersville, Ontario on the Six Nations of the Grand River Reserve. The Rebels play in the OLA Junior B Lacrosse League. The Rebels hold the record for most Junior B national championships in Founders Cup history with seven.

== History ==
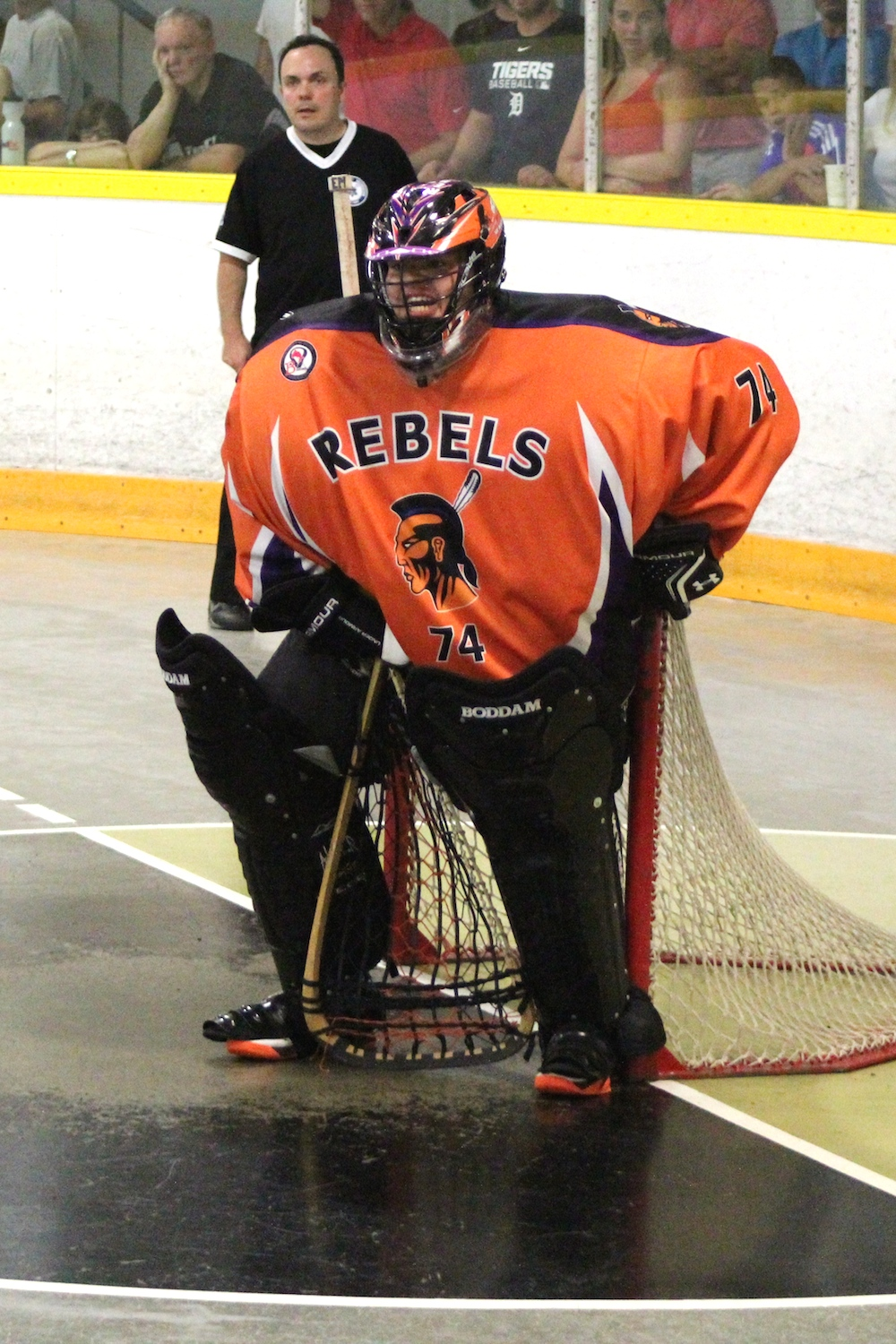
Rebels goalie Briley Miller in 2015 in road orange jersey.

Initially named the Six Nations Red Rebels. The Red Rebels follow in the tradition of the Six Nations Arrows. After years of success on the Six Nations 40 Reserve, in 1996 it became clear that it was time to add a second tier of Junior lacrosse to the region.

=== Founders Cup - 1997 ===
This theory was proven when the Red Rebels won the National title, the Founders Cup in only their second year of existence by defeating the favoured Orillia Rama Kings 9-7 in a thrilling Overtime Gold Medal match at the Mimico Arena in 1997. The Red Rebels finished the Round-Robin portion of the Founders Cup tournament with a 4-and-1 record. The Red Rebels met the host, Mimico Mountaineers and were pushed to overtime where they prevailed with a 7-6 win over a young netminder, Anthony Cosmo.

=== Founders Cup - 1998 ===
The Red Rebels won their 1st J. A. MacDonald Trophy as the Ontario Jr B Champions in 1998. The Red Rebels forced to play for the Bronze Medal as a result of a tie-breaking formula after the Clarington Green Gaels and the Iroquois Lacrosse Association finished in a 3-way tie for first-place at the Founders Cup championship held in Akwasasne. The Red Rebels defeated the Edmonton Miners 12-10 to win the Bronze Medal that season.

=== Ontario Finals- 2003 ===
The Rebels dropped the term Red from their name prior to the 2002 OLA Jr B Regular season. The Rebels made a run during the 2003 season, however, the upstart Barrie Tornado won the hard fought five game Ontario Jr B championship series. Barrie went on to win the Founders Cup that year.

=== Founders Cup - 2007 ===
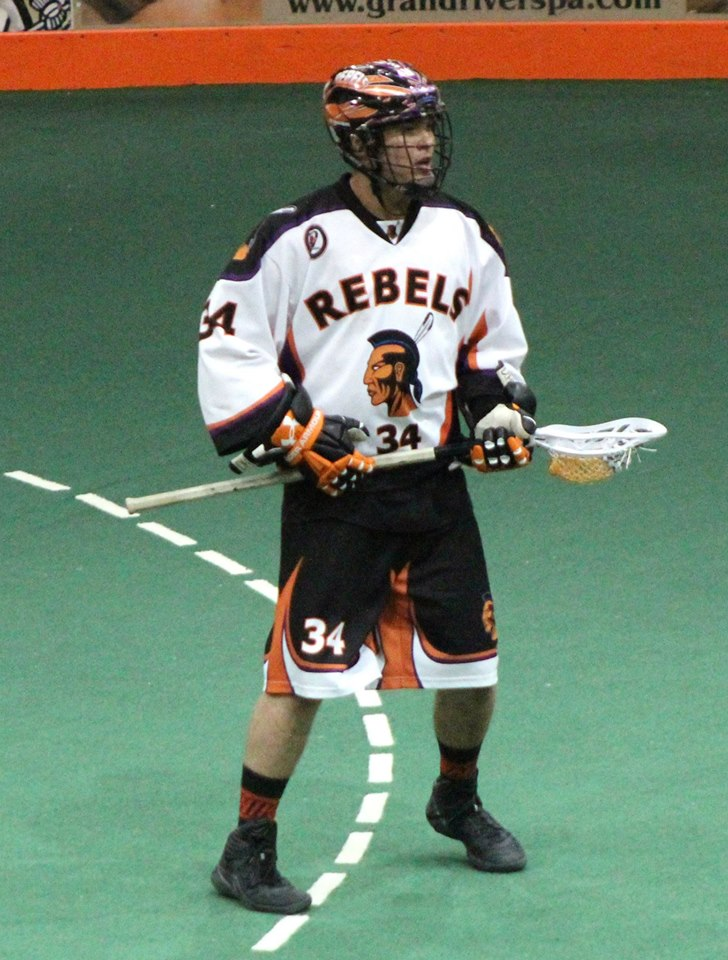
Rebels transition player Ashton Jacobs at home during 2015 season.

The Rebels did not made a serious run again until the memorable 2007 season. After start the regular season by dropping two of their first three games, the Rebels proceeded to go unbeaten in regulation time the rest of the season to finish with a 17-and-3 record for 1st-place in Western Conference. After sweeping the 8th-seed, Hamilton Bengals in the opening round, Six Nations found a tough veteran-laden Owen Sound Rams squad in their path. The Rebels took the opening game relatively easy, but in game two Owen Sound upset Six Nations with a 9-7 overtime victory. The series returned to the Gaylord Powless Arena where the Rebels proceeded to take game two 10-6 and game three 14-7 to advance to the Western Conference Final against the Windsor AKO Fratmen. Six Nations would sweep the series but it was not an easy task winning 6-4, 9-3 and 6-5 over the tough Fratmen to advance to the Ontario Final against the undefeated Clarington Green Gaels. The Green Gaels were perfect through the regular season (20-and-0) and reached the Ontario Final in the minimum nine games. The Rebels shocked the favoured Green Gaels by winning 8-6 at the Bowmanville complex of game one. Six Nations returned to the Gaylord Powless Arena and won game two 10-7 before being pushed to overtime in game three on the Green Gaels home floor. However, the Rebels prevailed to win 9-6 to claim their 2nd J. A. MacDonald Trophy as Ontario Jr B Champions and the right to represent Ontario at the Founders Cup in Kamloops, B.C. The Rebels were dominating throughout the tournament by outscoring the seven teams they faced by a combined 86-25 at the Canadian Lacrosse Association Jr B Championships. Six Nations Rebels were crowned the best Jr B team in Canada following their 8-2 romp over the Coquitlam Adanacs to win the 2007 Founders Cup championship held at the MacArthur Sports Center. This is the second time the Rebels have won the Founders Cup in franchise history.

=== Ontario Jr B 2008 ===
The 2008 season had high expectation of the Rebels this season and the team did not disappoint their fans as they completed their 1st perfect Regular season in franchise history by winning all 20 games to be seeded 1st throughout the Ontario Jr B playoffs. Six Nations set a team record by allowing only 89 goals in the 20 regular season games which challenged the 1989 record of 84 goals allowed by the goalie tandem of Stephen Dietrich and Bob Watson of the Kitchener-Waterloo Braves. The Rebels road to their 2nd consecutive J. A. MacDonald Trophy was not as smooth as the regular season. Six Nations began with a 3-game sweep of Wallaceburg Red Devils. The Rebels won the 1st game of the next series against the Windsor AKO Fratmen. However, the Rebels calendar year of being perfect would come to an end on same August 15 that they had last felt the sting of a defeat as Windsor won game two 7-6 to tie the series at one game apiece. Six Nations would win the next two games 10-7 and 10-4 to advance to the Western Conference Finals against the red hot, Elora Mohawks. The Mohawks were riding a 13-game winning coming into the series. Elora upset the Rebels 11-10 in the series opener at the Gaylord Powless Arena and followed up with a 9-6 win at the Elora Community Centre to lead the series 2-0. With their backs to the wall, Six Nations played a more desperate game in Game 3 to come away with a 10-4 victory. Back in Elora the Rebels kept rolling with a 12-7 triumph to force a Game 5. Six Nations completed their comeback with a 7-6 thriller as Cody Johnson would net the series winner with 45 seconds left on the clock to advance to the Ontario Jr B Final against the Halton Hills Bulldogs. The Rebels won the Ontario Jr B Final in four games over the Bulldogs to advance to the Founders Cup being held in Guelph.

=== Founders Cup 2008 ===
The Rebels breezed through the round-robin portion of the Founders Cup tournament which was being hosted by the Guelph Regals. Six Nations defeated Longueuil Patriotes 14-2, Port Coquitlam Saints 9-3, Saskatchewan SWAT 19-2, Calgary Mountaineers 9-3 and Calgary Chill 17-4. The Rebels met up with the PoCo Saints in the semi-final and came away with a 10-3 triumph which would set up an All-Ontario final against the host Regals. The Rebels jumped out to a 4-1 over the Regals during the first period of the Founders Cup championship game. However, the improved Guelph Regals battled back to tie the game midway through the third period a 6-6. Just when talk of overtime became part of the conversation, Rebels Torrey VanEvery put the Rebels up 7-6 and Gold medal game MVP, Jeremy Johns would add the eventual game-winning-goal for an 8-6 with less than two minutes remaining. The Regals would add a goal at the buzzer for an 8-7 final. The Rebels became the 1st team since the 1994-1995 Orillia Kings to win back-to-back J. A. MacDonald Trophy and Founders Cup titles.

=== Founders Cup 2011 ===
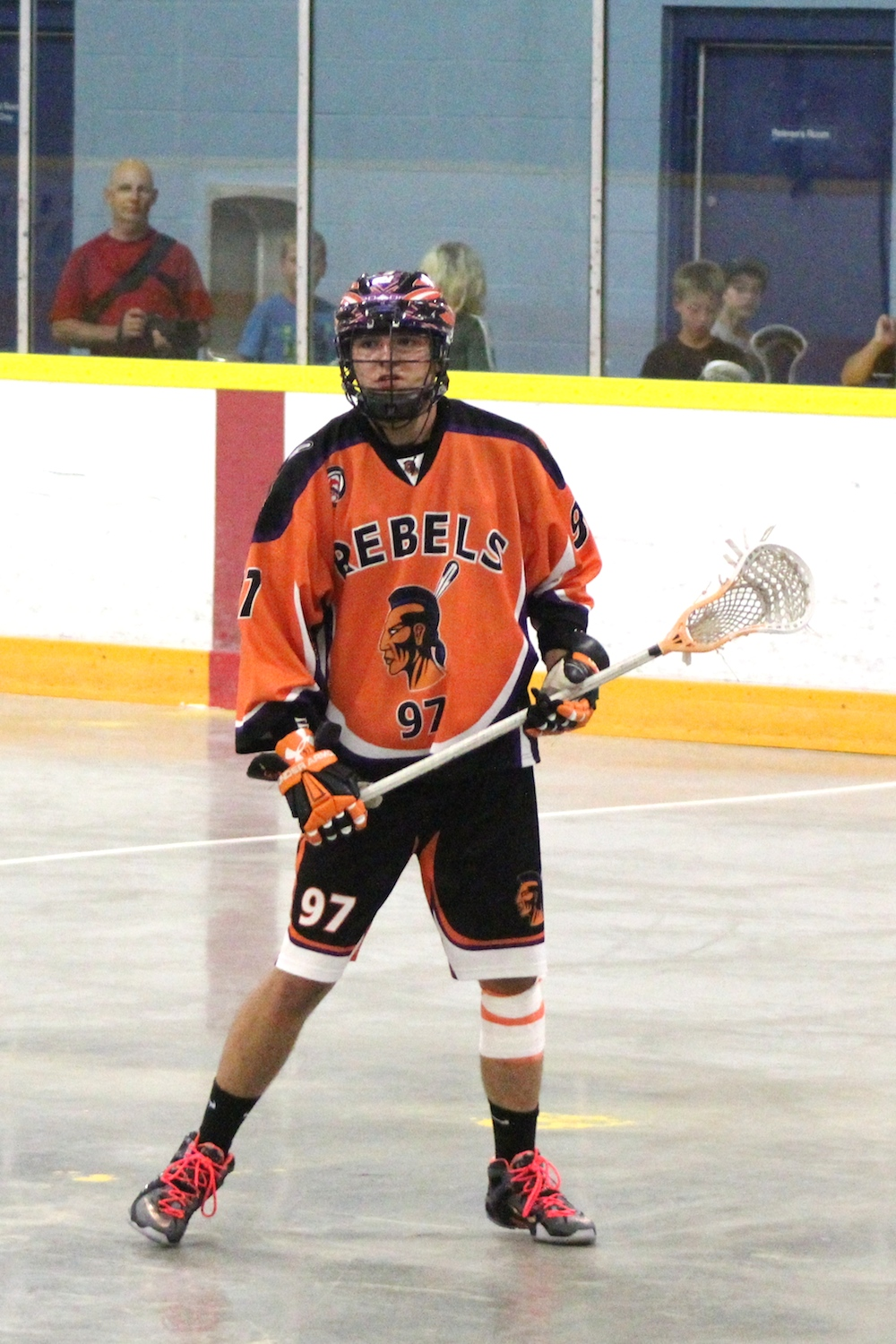
Rebels Danton Miller on the road in 2015.

They finished the 2011 season with a regular season record of 19-1-0 and secured the # 1-seed in the Western Conference. The team set a franchise record of 326 goals scored, surpassing the previous record set in 1997 by the Rebels first Founders Cup championship team. The postseason began with a 3-game sweeps of the Wallaceburg Red Devils and Windsor Clippers in the Western Conference Quarter and Semi-Finals. Next was the Rebels nemesis the previous 2 years, the Elora Mohawks. This year was different as the Rebels needed 4 games to eliminate the Mohawks to advance to the OLA Jr B Finals against the Halton Hills Bulldogs for the J. A. MacDonald Trophy. The Rebels took the finals opener 14-11, however the Bulldogs would win the next two contest 9-6 and 8-5. The Rebels rebounded to win game four 13-9 to force the fifth and final game at the Iroquois Lacrosse Arena. With more than 1,600 lacrosse fans watching the final game, the Rebels would claim a 10-7 victory to advance to the Founders Cup tournament in Saskatoon, Saskatchewan. The Rebels breezed through the round robin earning a perfect 5-0 record with victories over the Calgary Mountaineers (14-11), Montreal Phoenix (20-2), Manitoba Gryphons (17-3), Saskatchewan Selects (27-4) and Saskatchewan SWAT (16-8) giving them a bye into the finals. The finals saw the Rebels faced their 1st round opponents, Calgary Mountaineers. The Rebels completed their quest by winning the championship game 14-11 to win their 3rd Founders Cup in 5 years and 4th in franchise history.

=== Founders Cup 2012 ===
Six Nations Rebels hosted the 2012 Founders Cup Tournament at the Iroquois Lacrosse Arena from August 14 to August 19 with 8 teams from across Canada in attendance. The representatives from across Canada were as follows: BC Jr B Lacrosse - Kamloops Venom, Alberta Jr B Lacrosse - Calgary Mountaineers, Saskatchewan Jr B Lacrosse - Saskatchewan SWAT, Manitoba Jr B Lacrosse - Manitoba Gryphons, Ontario Jr B Lacrosse - Akwesasne Indians, Quebec Jr B Lacrosse - Team Quebec, Nova Scotia Jr B Lacrosse - Team Nova Scotia, Iroquois Lacrosse Association - Onondaga Redhawks and the host team Six Nations Rebels. Teams were split into two Pools. Pool A had Akwesasne Indians, Onondaga Redhawks, Team Quebec and Saskatchewan SWAT. Pool B had Calgary Mountaineers, Kamloops Venom, Manitoba Gryphons, Team Nova Scotia and Six Nations Rebels. There were 25 games were played, 18 in the preliminary rounds and 7 playoff games. Akwesasne Indians won Pool A with a 4-0-0 record, Onondaga Redhawks 3-1-0, Saskatchewan SWAT 1-3-0 and Team Quebec 0-4-0. While Pool B finished Six Nations Rebels 3-0-1, Calgary Mountaineers 3-0-1, Team Nova Scotia 2-2-0, Manitoba Gryphons 1-3-0 and Kamloops Venom 0-4-0. Six Nations was awarded # 1-seed in Pool A due to better Goal Differential against common opponents. Semi-finals pitted Six Nations Rebels vs Onondaga Redhawks in one Semi-final and Akwesasne Indians vs Calgary Mountaineers in the other semi-final. Six Nations Rebels defeated Onondaga Redhawks 19-8 while Akwesasne Indians defeated Calgary Mountaineers 11-8 to advance to the Founders Cup Championship game. In the Tier II semi-finals - Team Nova Scotia defeated Team Quebec 10-8 and Saskatchewan SWAT edged Manitoba Gryphons 12-11. Tier II final saw Team Nova Scotia win the Six Nations Elected Council Trophy as they beat the SWAT 11-6. Calgary Mountaineers defeated Onondaga Redhawks 17-11 to win the Bronze Medal Game. Founders Cup Final saw Six Nations Rebels jump out to a 4-2 first period and 6-2 second period lead, then hang on for a thrilling 8-7 victory over Akwesanse Indians before 2,700 lacrosse fans to become the first team to win 5 Founders Cup Championships. It is the 4th Founders Cup win in the last 6 years for Six Nations. The Rebels won in 1997, 2007, 2008, 2011 and 2012.

== Season-by-season results ==
Note: GP = Games played, W = Wins, L = Losses, T = Ties, Pts = Points, GF = Goals for, GA = Goals against

| Season | GP | W | L | T | GF | GA | PTS | Placing | Playoffs |
|---|---|---|---|---|---|---|---|---|---|
| 1996 | 22 | 5 | 17 | 0 | 240 | 330 | 10 | 7th OJBLL West | DNQ |
| 1997 | 22 | 18 | 4 | 0 | 305 | 198 | 36 | 1st OJBLL West | Won Division SF, 4-2 (Regals); Won Division Final, 4-3 (Spartans); Lost League Final, 0-3 (Kings); Won Founders Cup |
| 1998 | 24 | 18 | 6 | 0 | 279 | 200 | 36 | 3rd OJBLL West | Won Division SF, 4-3 (Mavericks); Won Division Final, 4-2 (Flying Dutchmen); Won League Final, 4-2 (Green Gaels); 3rd at Founders Cup |
| 1999 | 21 | 10 | 11 | 0 | 232 | 214 | 20 | 6th OJBLL West | Lost 1st round |
| 2000 | 21 | 11 | 9 | 0 | 222 | 179 | 22 | 4th OJBLL West | Lost quarter-final |
| 2001 | 20 | 14 | 5 | 1 | 227 | 182 | 29 | 4th OJBLL West | Lost quarter-final |
| 2002 | 22 | 13 | 9 | 0 | 246 | 199 | 26 | 6th OJBLL West | Lost 1st round |
| 2003 | 20 | 16 | 2 | 2 | 271 | 157 | 34 | 2nd OJBLL West | Lost final |
| 2004 | 20 | 15 | 5 | 0 | 236 | 164 | 30 | 4th OJBLL West | Lost 1st round |
| 2005 | 20 | 11 | 8 | 1 | 180 | 174 | 23 | 4th OJBLL West | Lost quarter-final |
| 2006 | 20 | 10 | 10 | 0 | 193 | 175 | 20 | 9th OJBLL West | DNQ |
| 2007 | 20 | 17 | 3 | 0 | 203 | 117 | 34 | 1st OJBLL West | Won League, won Founders Cup |
| 2008 | 20 | 20 | 0 | 0 | 215 | 89 | 40 | 1st OJBLL West | Won League, won Founders Cup |
| 2009 | 20 | 13 | 6 | 1 | 171 | 102 | 27 | 3rd OJBLL West | Lost Conference Final |
| 2010 | 20 | 20 | 0 | 0 | 247 | 108 | 40 | 1st OJBLL West | Lost Conference Final |
| 2011 | 20 | 19 | 1 | 0 | 326 | 135 | 38 | 1st of 5 South West; 1st of 13 Western; T-1st of 25 OJBLL | Won Conf. QF, 3-0 (Red Devils); Won Conf. SF, 3-0 (Northmen); Won Conf. Final, 3-1 (Mohawks); Won OJBLL Final, 3-2 (Bulldogs); Won Founders Cup (5-0) |
| 2012 | 20 | 18 | 2 | 0 | 309 | 167 | 36 | 1st of 5 South West; 1st of 14 Western; T-2nd of 26 OJBLL | Won Conf. QF, 3-0 (Thunderhawks); Won Conf. SF, 3-0 (Northmen); Won Conf. Final, 3-2 (Red Devils); Won OJBLL Final, 3-0 (Lightning); Won Founders Cup (5-0-1) |
| 2013 | 20 | 20 | 0 | 0 | 327 | 107 | 40 | 1st of 5 South West; 1st of 14 Western; 1st of 26 OJBLL | Won Conf. QF, 2-0 (Excelsiors); Won Conf. SF, 3-0 (Thunderhawks); Won Conf. Final, 3-0 (Northmen); Won OJBLL Final, 3-1 (Green Gaels); Won Founders Cup (6-0) |
| 2014 | 20 | 20 | 0 | 0 | 351 | 100 | 40 | 1st of 5 South West; 1st of 14 Western; 1st of 26 OJBLL | Won Conf. QF, 3-0 (Generals); Won Conf. SF, 3-0 (Thunderhawks); Won Conf. Final, 3-1 (Northmen); Won OJBLL Final, 3-0 (Bulldogs); Won Founders Cup (7-0) |
| 2015 | 20 | 19 | 1 | 0 | 269 | 114 | 38 | 1st of 5 South West; 1st of 13 Western; 1st of 25 OJBLL | Won Conf. QF, 3-0 (Red Devils); Won Conf. SF, 3-0 (Clippers); Won Conf. Final, 3-2 (Northmen); Lost OJBLL Final, 1-3 (Indians) |
| 2016 | 20 | 12 | 6 | 2 | 224 | 148 | 26 | 2nd of 5 South West; 4th of 13 Western; 8th of 25 OJBLL | Won Conf. QF, 3-0 (Spartans); Lost Conf. SF, 1-3 (Northmen) |
| 2017 | 20 | 19 | 1 | 0 | 338 | 130 | 38 | 1st of 5 South West; 1st of 13 Western; 1st of 25 OJBLL | Won Conf. QF, 3-0 (Pacers); Won Conf. SF, 3-0 (Bengals); Lost Conf. Final, 1-3 (Northmen) |
| 2018 | 20 | 18 | 1 | 1 | 260 | 144 | 37 | 1st of 5 South West; 1st of 13 Western; 1st of 25 OJBLL | Won Conf. QF, 3-0 (Spartans); Won Conf. SF, 3-0 (Northmen); Lost Conf. Final, 2-3 (Mohawks) |
| 2019 | 20 | 19 | 1 | 0 | 308 | 115 | 38 | 1st of 4 South West; 1st of 12 Western; T-2nd of 24 OJBLL | Won Conf. QF, 3-1 (Regals); Won Conf. SF, 3-0 (Clippers); Won Conf. Final, 3-0 (Bengals); Won OJBLL Final, 3-2 (Indians); 2nd of 7 Founders Cup |

=== Playoff results ===
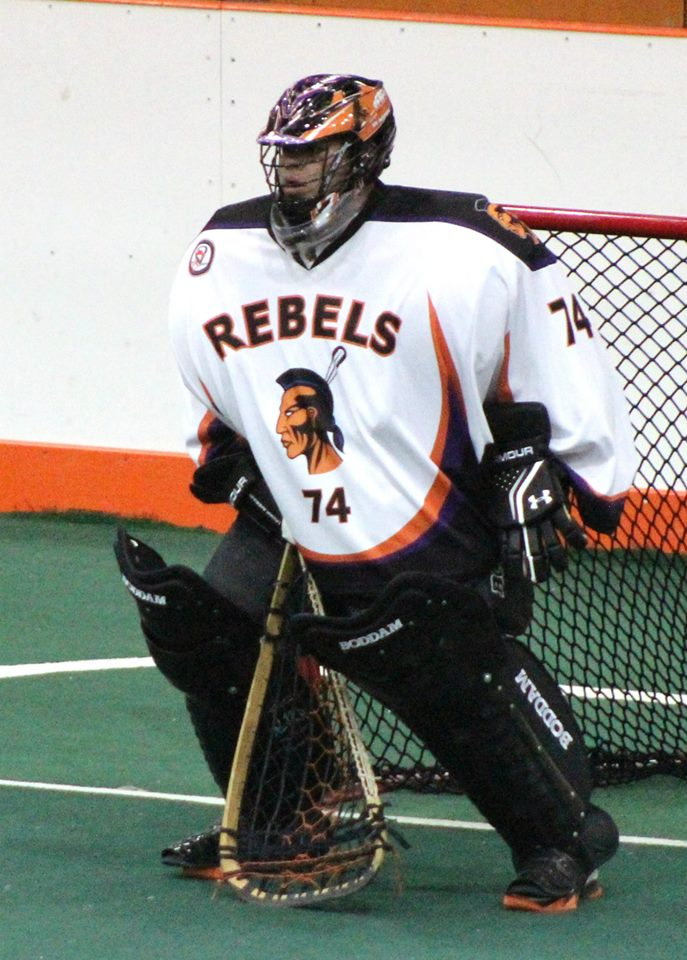
Goalie Briley Miller at home in 2015.

| Season | Opponent | Series | GF–GA | Result | Round |
|---|---|---|---|---|---|
| 1999 | Elora Mohawks | 0-3 | 28-37 | Loss | Conference QF |
| 2000 | Elora Mohawks | 1-4 | 54-56 | Loss | Division SF |
| 2001 | St. Catharines Spartans | 3-0 | 27-20 | Win | Conference QF |
| -- | Wallaceburg Red Devils | 1-4 | 57-67 | Loss | Conference SF |
| 2002 | Sarnia Pacers | 0-3 | 25-31 | Loss | Conference QF |
| 2003 | Orangeville Northmen | 3-0 | 40-22 | Win | Conference QF |
| -- | Elora Mohawks | 3-1 | 30-27 | Win | Conference SF |
| -- | St. Catharines Spartans | 3-1 | 35-37 | Win | Conference Final |
| -- | Barrie Tornado | 2-3 | 51-47 | Loss | OLA Final |
| 2004 | Owen Sound Flying Dutchmen | 1-3 | 30-34 | Loss | Conference QF |
| 2005 | Windsor AKO Fratmen | 3-1 | 35-30 | Win | Conference QF |
| -- | Orangeville Northmen | 0-3 | 15-29 | Loss | Conference SF |
| 2007 | Hamilton Bengals | 3-0 | 30-18 | Win | Conference QF |
| -- | Owen Sound Rams | 3-1 | 45-26 | Win | Conference SF |
| -- | Windsor AKO Fratmen | 3-0 | 21-12 | Win | Conference Final |
| -- | Clarington Green Gaels | 3-0 | 27-19 | Win | OLA Final |
| -- | Founders Cup | 7-0 | 86-25 | 1st | Tournament Champions |
| 2008 | Wallaceburg Red Devils | 3-0 | 42-7 | Win | Conference QF |
| -- | Windsor AKO Fratmen | 3-1 | 35-22 | Win | Conference SF |
| -- | Elora Mohawks | 3-2 | 45-37 | Win | Conference Final |
| -- | Halton Hills Bulldogs | 3-1 | 34-19 | Win | OLA Final |
| -- | Founders Cup | 7-0 | 86-24 | 1st | Tournament Champions |
| 2009 | Oakville Buzz | 3-2 | 25-23 | Win | Conference QF |
| -- | Welland Warlords | 3-2 | 30-28 | Win | Conference SF |
| -- | Elora Mohawks | 2-3 | 41-43 | Loss | Conference Final |
| 2010 | St. Catharines Spartans | 3-0 | 32-18 | Win | Conference QF |
| -- | Orangeville Northmen | 3-0 | 28-10 | Win | Conference SF |
| -- | Elora Mohawks | 2-3 | 35-36 | Loss | Conference Final |

== Founders Cup ==
CANADIAN NATIONAL CHAMPIONSHIPS

| Year | Round Robin | Record W-L-T | Standing | Quarter-final | Semifinal | Bronze Medal Game | Gold Medal Game |
|---|---|---|---|---|---|---|---|
| 1997; Etobicoke, ON | W, Edmonton Miners 12-11; W, Iroquois Nationals 14-11; L, Orillia Kings 7-10; W, Team Nova Scotia 22-1; W, Mimico Mountaineers 13-4 | 4-1-0 | | N/A | W, Mimico Mountaineers 7-6 OT | N/A | W, Orillia Kings 11-9 OT; CHAMPIONS |
| 1998; Akwesasne | L, Iroquois Nationals 5-11; W, Clarington Green Gaels 11-6; W, Edmonton Miners 18-9 | 2-1-0 | 3rd of 4 | N/A | N/A | W, Edmonton Miners 12-10 | N/A |
| 2007; Kamloops, BC | W, Sherwood Park Titans 13-8; W, Kamloops Rattlers 10-2; W, Moose Jaw Mustangs 19-7; W, Port Coquitlam Saints 12-2; W, Longueuil Patriotes 12-3 | 5-0-0 | 1st of 6 Pool A | N/A | W, Calgary Shamrocks 12-1 | N/A | W, Coquitlam Adanacs 8-2; CHAMPIONS |
| 2008; Guelph, ON | W, Longueuil Patriotes 14-2; W, Port Coquitlam Saints 9-3; W, Saskatchewan SWAT 19-2; W, Calgary Mountaineers 9-3; W, Calgary Chill 17-4 | 5-0-0 | 1st of 6 Pool B | N/A | W, Port Coquitlam Saints 10-3 | N/A | W, Guelph Regals 8-7; CHAMPIONS |
| 2011; Saskatoon, SK | W, Calgary Mountaineers 14-11; W, Montreal Phoenix 20-2; W, Manitoba Gryphons 17-3; W, Saskatchewan Selects 27-4; W, Saskatchewan SWAT 16-8 | 5-0-0 | 1st of 6 | N/A | N/A | N/A | W, Calgary Mountaineers 14-11; CHAMPIONS |
| 2012; HOST | W, Kamloops Venom 18-6; W, Manitoba Gryphons 13-4; W, Team Nova Scotia 19-7; T, Calgary Mountaineers 6-6 | 3-0-1 | 1st of 5 Pool B | N/A | W, Onondaga Jr. Redhawks 19-8 | N/A | W, Akwesasne Indians 8-7; CHAMPIONS |
| 2013; Winnipeg, MB | W, Calgary Mountaineers 16-7; W, Team Nova Scotia 23-4; W, Manitoba Selects 18-4 | 3-0-0 | 1st of 4 Pool B | W, Team Quebec 21-0 | W, Onondaga Jr. Redhawks 22-8 | N/A | W, Calgary Mountaineers 16-12; CHAMPIONS |
| 2014; Halifax, NS | W, Saskatchewan SWAT 23-6; W, Seneca WarChiefs 12-6; W, Red Deer Rampage 15-5; W, Team Quebec 29-0; W, Manitoba Blizzard 16-2; W, Team Nova Scotia 23-1 | 6-0-0 | 1st of 7 | N/A | N/A | N/A | W, Seneca WarChiefs 14-7; CHAMPIONS |
| 2019; Winnipeg, MB | W, North Shore Kodiaks 14-5; W, Coquitlam Adanacs 11-5; W, Seneca WarChiefs 12-7; W, Saskatchewan SWAT 19-4; W, Manitoba Blizzard 16-3; W, Calgary Shamrocks 19-3 | 6-0-0 | 1st of 7 | | | | L, Calgary Shamrocks 15-16 |
