= Patrick Crosby =

American lacrosse and ice hockey player

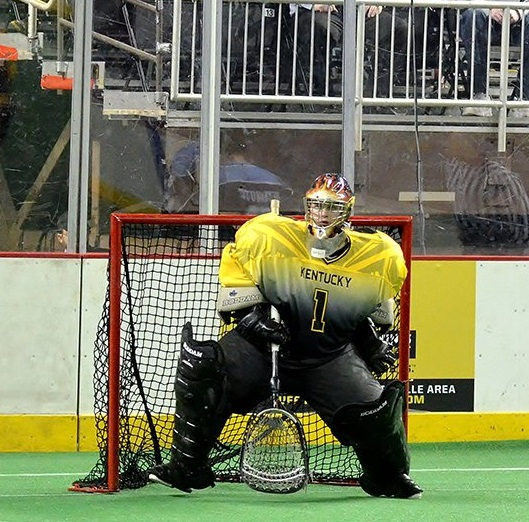

Personal information
- Born: 17 July 1988 (age 37) Sayreville, New Jersey, U.S.
- Education: Temple University
- Height: 5 ft 10 in (178 cm)
- Weight: 160 lb (73 kg; 11 st 6 lb)

Sport
- Position: Goaltender
- Catches: Left
- NLL team Former teams: Philadelphia Wings; Kentucky Stickhorses, Vermont Voyageurs, Rochester Greywolves, Rochester River Monsters, Oshawa Outlaws
- Pro career: 2011–

Patrick Crosby (born July 17, 1988) is an American professional indoor lacrosse goaltender from Philadelphia, PA. Crosby played collegiate ice hockey for Temple University of the American Collegiate Hockey Association. Crosby has played in the Three Nations Senior Lacrosse League (Akwesasne Mad Mohawks), Quebec Senior Lacrosse League (Vermont Voyageurs), Can-Am Senior B Lacrosse League (Rochester Greywolves | Rochester River Monsters) as well as with the U.S. Indoor Lacrosse National Developmental Team (2009–2011). Crosby was selected to represent Slovakia at the 2011 FIL World Indoor Lacrosse Championship in Prague, CZ. He has played professionally for the Kentucky Stickhorses of the NALL (North American Lacrosse League) where he was selected as the 3rd overall pick in the 2011 Entry Draft. In 2021, he was signed to the Philadelphia Wings practice squad. Crosby is originally from Sayreville, NJ.

== Amateur career ==
Crosby has played in the Baltimore Indoor Lacrosse League, Philadelphia Box Lacrosse Association and Philadelphia Indoor Lacrosse League. He also played for the United States Developmental Team in the Freedom Cup in Richmond, Virginia in 2010. He also played for the USIL Developmental team for three seasons in net.

== Canadian Lacrosse ==
In 2008 Crosby played for the Akwesasne Mad Mohawks of the Three Nations Senior Lacrosse League. He would spend the next two seasons with the Vermont Voyageurs of the Quebec Senior Lacrosse League. Crosby also played for the United States Developmental team in 2010 and 2011, and in 2012 played with the Rochester Greywolves of the Can-Am Senior B Lacrosse League. He helped lead the Greywolves to the playoffs that season.

Since 2018, Crosby has been with the Rochester River Monsters of the Can-Am Senior B Lacrosse League.

In 2019/2020, Crosby signed and appeared with the Oshawa Outlaws of the Arena Lacrosse League.

== International ==
Crosby represented team Slovakia in the 2011 FIL World Indoor Lacrosse Championship in Prague, Czech Republic in 2011.

In 2013 Crosby was drafted by LC Custodes Radotín (CZ) in the European Lacrosse League and competed in the 2013 ELL season.

== Kentucky Stickhorses ==
Crosby was the third overall pick in the 2011 North American Lacrosse League Draft.

Kentucky went 5-1 in their inaugural season, in which he played in every game.

In 2013 he returned to Kentucky where he started in the championship game.

Crosby was the only American goaltender to be selected in the original NALL draft and not signed as a free agent.

== National Lacrosse League ==
In December 2021, Crosby signed with the Philadelphia Wings to their practice squad.

== Hockey ==
Crosby played collegiate ice hockey with the Temple Owls.
