= Lacrosse Canada =

National governing body of lacrosse

- Sport: Lacrosse
- Jurisdiction: National
- Founded: 1867
- Affiliation: World Lacrosse
- Regional affiliation: Pan-American Lacrosse Association
- Headquarters: Ottawa, Ontario
- President: Shawn Williams

Official website
- www.lacrosse.ca
- (Canada)

Lacrosse Canada (French: Crosse Canada), formerly the Canadian Lacrosse Association, founded in 1867, is the governing body of lacrosse in Canada. It conducts national junior and senior championship tournaments for men and women in both field and box lacrosse. There are five national teams that compete in World Lacrosse championships on a four-year cycle.

== Championships ==
Box

- Mann Cup Senior "A"
- Presidents Cup Senior "B"
- Minto Cup Junior "A"
- Founders Cup Junior "B"
- 16U Girls Box Nationals
- 16U Boys Box Nationals
- 14U Girls Box Nationals
- 14U Boys Box Nationals
- 12U Boys Box Nationals
- 21U Junior Women's Nationals

Field

- Ross Cup Senior Division I
- Victory Trophy Senior Division II
- First Nations Trophy U18 Boys
- Alumni Cup U15 Boys
- U19 Women's Field Nationals

== Bodies ==
- Alberta Lacrosse Association
- British Columbia Lacrosse Association
- Fédération de crosse du Québec
- First Nations Lacrosse Association
- Lacrosse New Brunswick
- Lacrosse Nova Scotia
- Lacrosse PEI
- Manitoba Lacrosse Association
- Newfoundland Lacrosse Association
- Ontario Lacrosse Association
- Saskatchewan Lacrosse Association

== Leagues ==
=== Senior A ===
- Major Series Lacrosse
- Western Lacrosse Association

=== Senior B ===
- Can-Am Lacrosse League
- Nova Scotia Senior Lacrosse League
- OLA Senior B Lacrosse League
- Quebec Senior Lacrosse League
- Rocky Mountain Lacrosse League
- Three Nations Senior Lacrosse League
- West Coast Senior Lacrosse Association
- Prairie Gold Lacrosse League

=== Junior A ===
- British Columbia Junior A Lacrosse League
- Ontario Junior A Lacrosse League
- Rocky Mountain Lacrosse League
