= Wallaceburg Red Devils =

- Sport: Box lacrosse
- Founded: 1998
- League: Ontario Junior B Lacrosse League
- Based in: Wallaceburg, Ontario
- Arena: Wallaceburg Memorial Arena
- Colours: Red, Black, and White
- Head coach: Gord Lily; Assist. Coaches: Cecile Jacobs
- General manager: Chris Dawson

The Wallaceburg Red Devils are Junior "B" box lacrosse team from Wallaceburg, Ontario, Canada. The Red Devils play in the OLA Junior B Lacrosse League and were 2001 Founders Cup National Champions.

== History ==
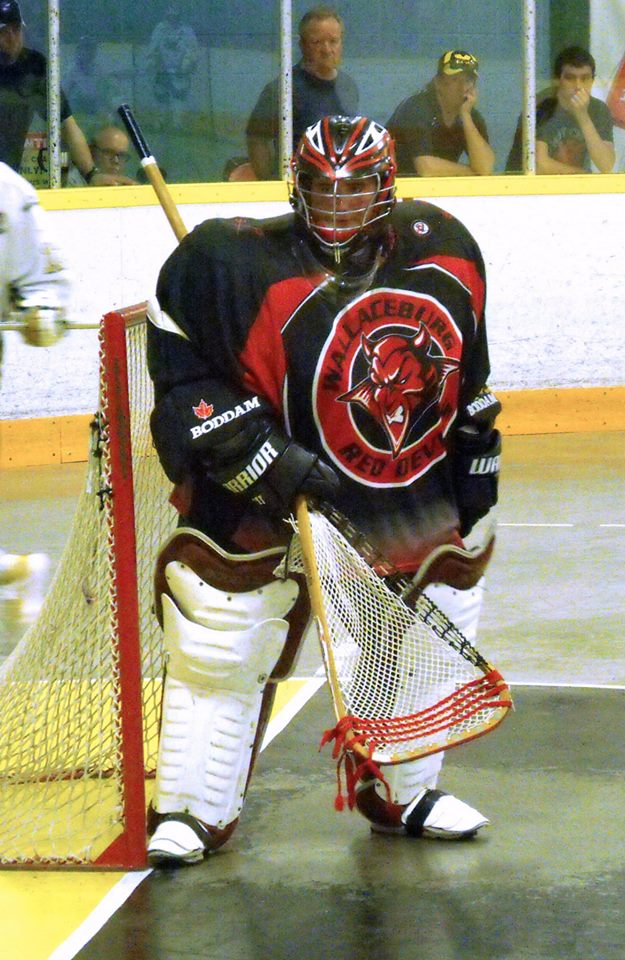
Red Devils goalie in away jersey 2014.

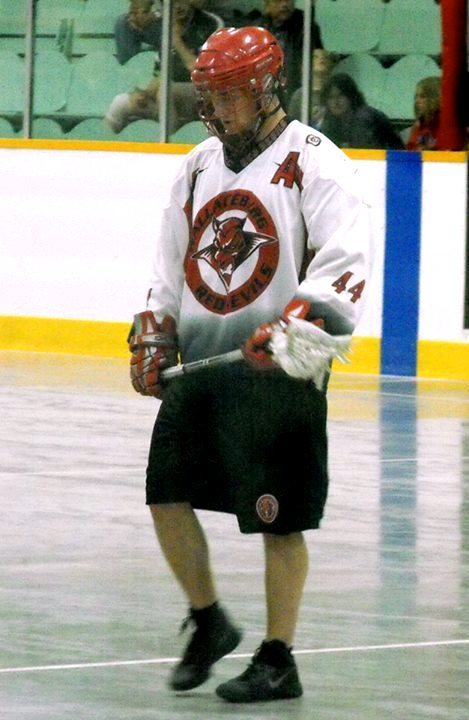
Red Devils player 2014.

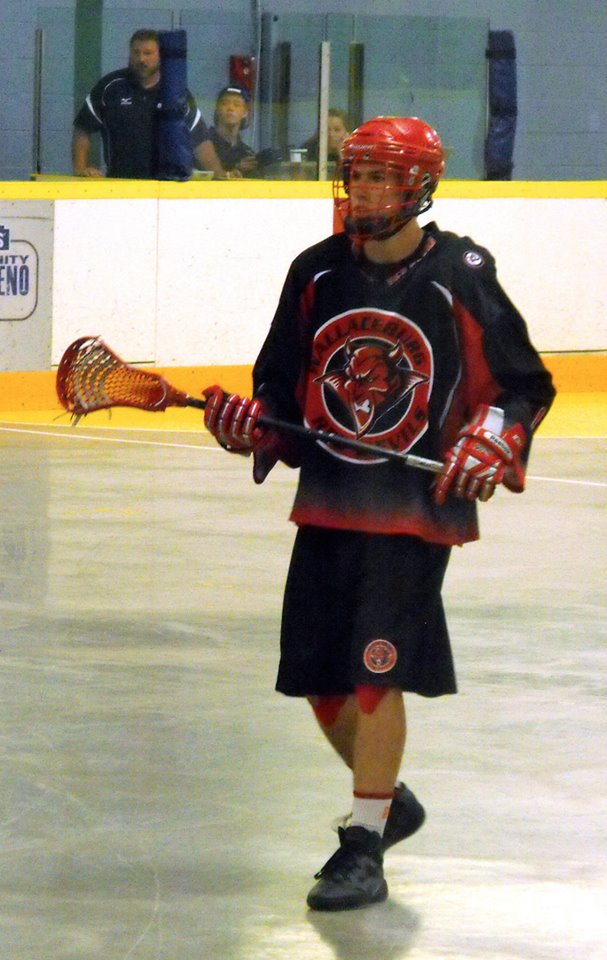
Red Devils player in away jersey 2014.

The Wallaceburg Red Devils played their first season in the Summer of 1998. At times, the Red Devils played some of their home games in the nearby Town of Walpole Island, Ontario. Eventually they moved full time into the town of Wallaceburg.

=== 2001 season ===
The Red Devils are best known for coming out of nowhere in 2001 to win the Founders Cup National title. In 2001, the Red Devils were a true sleeper. After their first three season, Wallaceburg was developing quite well as a lacrosse team but showed no real threat towards winning any championships. They finished the regular season quite well with a 16-4-0 record, placing 2nd in the West. In the first round of the playoffs, they defeated the Welland Warlords 3 games to none. In the second round, they beat the Six Nations Red Rebels 4 games to 1. In the Conference Final, they beat the powerhouse Elora Mohawks, who did not lose a regular season game, 3 games to 2. In the series, the Mohawks actually beat the Devils 25-6 in Game 3, but when Elora forced a fifth and deciding game, both teams went the distance with the Red Devils coming out on top 12-11 in double overtime. Both the Red Devils and Scarborough Saints (East Champions) moved on to the Founders Cup, the highest placing of the two would be presented the J.A. MacDonald Trophy as OLA Champions.

At the Founders Cup, in the round robin the Red Devils would beat the Poco Saints 17-6, Calgary Bandits 17-4, the Manitoba Falcons 19-10, and the Edmonton Miners 10-8 to finish first in Pool A. In the crossover semi-final, the Red Devils defeated the Delta Islanders 11-5 to earn a berth into the national final. With the win, as Scarborough lost their semi-final, the Red Devils were declared OLA MacDonald Trophy Champions. In the final, the Red Devils again met Edmonton, this time beating them 10-5 to win the Founders Cup.

Goalie Josh McNaughton was named to the tournament all-star team, while Kevin Dostie was declared the most valuable player.

=== Since 2001 ===
The Red Devils have a territorial rivalry with the nearby and much older Point Edward Pacers franchise. In 2003, the Windsor Fratmen (now Windsor Clippers) and London Blue Devils joined the fray and the four teams formed the Far West Division in the Ontario Junior B Lacrosse League. The four teams maintain an often heated and competitive rivalry. Since 2003, the Clippers have led the way with 9 division titles, but neither London, Windsor, or Point Edward have won a Founders Cup since Wallaceburg's win in 2001. The Red Devils also have a healthy rivalry with the Six Nations Rebels of Hagersville, Ontario as both teams are based in Native Reserve communities.

== Season-by-season results ==
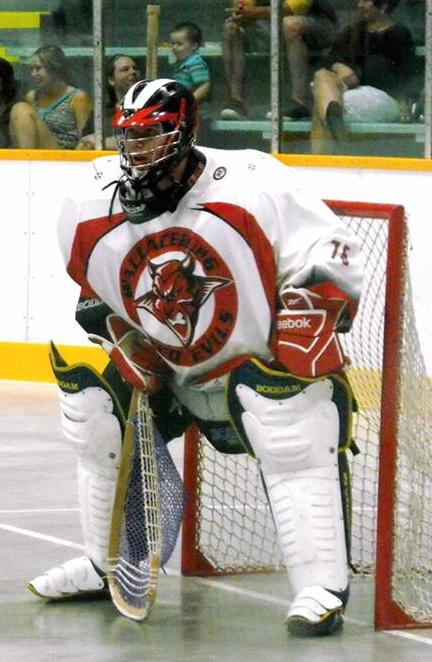
Red Devils goalie 2014.

Note: GP = Games played, W = Wins, L = Losses, T = Ties, Pts = Points, GF = Goals for, GA = Goals against

Season	GP	W	L	T	GF	GA	PTS	Placing	Playoffs
1998	24	10	14	0	210	259	20	6th OJBLL West	DNQ
1999	21	11	10	0	232	219	22	5th OJBLL West	Lost Conf. QF, 0-3 (Mavericks)
2000	21	9	12	0	225	242	18	5th OJBLL West	DNQ
2001	20	16	4	0	220	141	32	2nd OJBLL West	Won Conf. QF, 3-0 (Warlords); Won Conf. SF, 4-1 (Red Rebels); Won Conf. Final, 3-2 (Mohawks); Declared League Champions (Saints); Due to superior record at Founders Cup
2002	22	4	18	0	117	276	8	11th OJBLL West	DNQ
2003	20	3	17	0	158	307	6	12th OJBLL West	DNQ
2004	20	7	13	0	168	212	14	9th OJBLL West	DNQ
2005	20	5	15	0	146	201	10	10th OJBLL West	DNQ
2006	20	10	9	1	200	173	21	8th OJBLL West	Lost Conf. QF, 0-3 (Northmen)
2007	20	13	7	0	204	164	26	5th OJBLL West	Lost Conf. QF, 1-3 (Mohawks)
2008	20	10	10	0	173	155	20	8th OJBLL West	Lost Conf. QF, 0-3 (Rebels)
2009	20	6	13	1	125	171	13	11th OJBLL West	DNQ
2010	20	7	13	0	141	198	14	3rd of 4 Far West; 10th Western	DNQ
2011	20	9	11	0	194	246	18	3rd of 4 Far West; 8th of 13 Western; Tied-14th of 25 OJBLL	Lost Conf. QF, 0-3 (Rebels)
2012	20	13	7	0	211	194	26	2nd of 4 Far West; 5th of 14 Western; 9th of 26 OJBLL	Won Conf. QF, 3-2 (Spartans); Won Conf. SF, 3-0 (Blue Devils); Lost Conf. Final, 2-3 (Rebels)
2013	20	9	11	0	226	234	18	3rd of 4 Far West; 9th of 14 Western; Tied-16th of 26 OJBLL	DNQ
2014	20	14	6	0	219	148	28	2nd of 4 Far West; 6th of 14 Western; 10th of 26 OJBLL	Lost Conf. QF, 2-3 (Clippers)
2015	20	9	10	1	215	185	19	2nd of 4 Far West; 8th of 13 Western; 13th of 25 OJBLL	Lost Conf. QF, 0-3 (Rebels)
2016	20	8	12	0	189	195	16	2nd of 4 Far West; 9th of 13 Western; Tied-16th of 25 OJBLL	DNQ
2017	20	12	7	1	235	166	25	2nd of 4 Far West; 5th of 13 Western; Tied-8th of 25 OJBLL	Lost Conf. QF, 1-3 (Clippers)
2018	20	16	4	0	284	162	32	2nd of 4 Far West; 4th of 13 Western; 7th of 25 OJBLL	Won Conf. QF, 3-2 (Bengals); Lost Conf. SF, 1-3 (Mohawks)
2019	20	3	16	1	135	217	25	4th of 4 Far West; 11th of 12 Western; TBD of 24 OJBLL	DNQ

== Founders Cup ==
CANADIAN NATIONAL CHAMPIONSHIPS

Year	Round Robin	Record W-L-T	Standing	Semifinal	Gold Medal Game
2001; Edmonton, AB	W, Poco Saints 17-6; W, Calgary Bandits 17-4; W, Manitoba Falcons 19-10; W, Edmonton Miners 10-8	4-0-0	1st of 5 Pool A	W, Delta Islanders 11-5	W, Edmonton Miners 10-5; NATIONAL CHAMPIONS
