= Ross Cup =

The Ross Cup is the Canadian Senior Division I Field Lacrosse championship. The annual tournament is hosted by the Canadian Lacrosse Association and features men's teams from across Canada. Senior Division II compete for the Victory Trophy.

== Champions ==
Year	Winner	Runner-up
1984	Victoria	
1985	Peterborough	
1986	Victoria	
1987	Victoria	
1988	Victoria	
1989	Victoria	
1990	Victoria	
1991	Victoria	
1992	Coquitlam	
1993	Oshawa	
1994	Coquitlam	
1995	Victoria	
1996	Victoria	
1997	Victoria	
1998	Victoria	
1999	Victoria	
2000	Victoria	
2001	Victoria	
2002	Victoria	
2003	Tri-City	Nanaimo
2004	Tri-City	Calgary
2005	Tri-City	
2006	Tri-City	Calgary
2007	Tri-City	Six Nations
2008	Ladner Pioneers	Coquitlam Beerhunters
2009	Six Nations	Ladner Pioneers
2010	Calgary Boykiws	Ladner Pioneers
2011	Whalley Ballers	Ladner Pioneers
2012	Whalley Ballers	Calgary
2013	New Westminster Warlocks	Whalley Ballers
2014	Not Awarded	
2015	Centre Wellington Wolves	Hamilton Bengals
2016	Not Awarded	
2017	Wolfpack	Whalley Ballers
2018	Not Awarded	
2019	Hunters (Coquitlam)	Whalley Ballers
