= Native Sons (lacrosse) =

- Founded: 2015
- Disbanded: 2018
- League: Can-Am Senior B Lacrosse League
- Based in: Irving, New York
- Arena: Cattaraugus Community Center
- Colours: Gold & black
- President: JC Seneca
- Head coach: Donnie Brooks
- General manager: Shawn John
- League titles: (2) (2016, 2017)
- Website: twitter.com/NativeSonsLax

The Native Sons Lacrosse Club were an American and Iroquois Senior "B" box lacrosse team from Irving, New York. The team played their home games at Cattaraugus Community Center and were affiliated with the Senaca Nation of Indians. Native Sons competed in the Can-Am League, sanctioned by First Nations Lacrosse Association.

Native Sons Junior affiliate were the Seneca WarChiefs of First Nations Junior B Lacrosse League. The Warchiefs continue play despite Native Sons no longer being active.

== History ==
Formed in 2015, Native Sons were welcomed to the league by losing four of their first five games. The remaining portion of their Can-Am season was another story as the Sons finished 11–5 (third place) in their first season. Native Sons swept the opening round series against Pinewoods Smoke then eliminating Newtown Golden Eagles in three-straight. Their season would come to an end in the finals losing to Onondaga Redhawks in five games.

Year two saw the Native Sons finish just one point of the regular season championship with a record of 11–1–1. They would cruise through the opening two rounds eliminating Tonawanda Braves in two straight before eliminating Pinewoods Smoke in four games. The Can-Am finals would be a rematch against Onondaga, which Native Sons would avenge their loss of the previous season defeating the Redhawks in a four-game sweep. That earned the Native Sons a berth to the President's Cup.

Native Sons would go 2–1 in Pool play and earn a spot in the President's Cup quarterfinals where they would defeat Calgary Mountaineers. A semi-final loss to St. Albert Miners would send the Sons to the bronze medal game where they were defeated by Brooklin Merchants.

== Season-by-season ==
Season	W	L	T	Pts	Result	Playoff Result	W	L
2015	11	5	0	22	3rd of 9	Lost Finals vs Onondaga Redhawks	6	4
2016	11	1	1	23	2nd of 9	Won League	9	1
