= Gloucester Griffins =

- Sport: Box lacrosse
- Founded: 1978
- League: OLA Junior B Lacrosse League
- Based in: Gloucester, Ontario
- Arena: Earl Armstrong Arena
- Colours: Red, Green, and White
- Head coach: Jeremy Kearns
- General manager: Dave Smith

The Gloucester Griffins are a Junior "B" box lacrosse team from Gloucester, Ontario, Canada. The Griffins play in the OLA Junior B Lacrosse League.

== History ==
The Griffins were founded in 1978 as a Junior "B" lacrosse team and became and incorporated non-for-profit business in 1992. A couple times, due to the team nearness to the Quebec border, the Griffins have jumped leagues. The Griffs played in Quebec in 1979 and 1980, and then again in 1988 and 1989. The Griffins have been a constant fixture in the OLA-B since 1990. In 1989, the Griffins hosted the Founders Cup, the National Championships, on behalf of the Ligue de Crosse Junior du Québec and again they hosted it in 1991 for the OLA-B. As Quebec Provincial Champions in 1988 and 1989, they also earned their way to the tournament twice, for a total of three National Championship appearances.

Since re-entering the OLA-B, the Griffins had 5 strong seasons, but only got past the quarter-finals in the playoffs once. Since 1994, the sky has come crashing down for the Griffins. Once a powerhouse in Eastern Ontario lacrosse, the Griffins have suffered 12 straight losing seasons. The bottom fell out in 2005, with the Griffins completing an entirely winless season. The 0-20-0 Griffins averaged a 17.50 goals against average.

The team has since rebuilt and won the Far East title in 2009 with a 12-8-0 record thanks to a Grant Schubert overtime winner in the final game of the year against Kahnawake.

== Season-by-season results ==
Note: GP = Games played, W = Wins, L = Losses, T = Ties, Pts = Points, GF = Goals for, GA = Goals against

Season	GP	W	L	T	GF	GA	PTS	Placing	Playoffs
1978	18	0	18	0	146	429	0	4th OLA-B (Div)	Lost semi-final
1979	16	8	8	0	-	-	16	Quebec	
1980	-	-	-	-	-	-	-	Quebec	Lost OLA-B Semi-final
1981	18	7	11	0	215	238	14	5th OLA-B East	DNQ
1982	20	13	6	1	268	215	27	3rd OLA-B East	Lost quarter-final
1983	22	12	9	1	276	272	25	5th OLA-B East	Lost 1st round
1984	20	6	14	0	243	325	12	4th OLA-B Div III	Lost Tier II Quarter-final
1985	24	12	12	0	369	331	24	4th OLA-B East	Lost quarter-final
1986	18	10	7	1	234	215	21	2nd OLA-B East	Lost quarter-final
1987	19	14	5	0	260	183	30	2nd OLA-B East	Lost semi-final
1988	20	17	3	0	-	-	34	1st Quebec	Won League, lost Founders Cup Final
1989	16	13	3	0	-	-	26	1st Quebec	Won League, lost Founders Cup Final
1990	20	12	8	0	233	238	24	5th OLA-B	Lost quarter-final
1991	18	10	7	1	212	191	21	5th OLA-B	Lost quarter-final
1992	20	11	8	1	243	211	23	4th OLA-B	Lost quarter-final
1993	22	17	5	0	274	188	34	2nd OLA-B	Lost semi-final
1994	22	14	6	2	264	212	30	3rd OLA-B	Lost quarter-final
1995	22	9	13	0	249	243	18	4th OLA-B East	DNQ
1996	22	2	20	0	136	383	4	8th OLA-B East	DNQ
1997	22	1	21	0	145	384	2	8th OLA-B East	DNQ
1998	20	7	13	0	182	228	14	5th OLA-B East	DNQ
1999	20	9	10	1	187	195	18	6th OLA-B East	Lost 1st round
2000	20	7	13	0	170	186	14	6th OLA-B East	DNQ
2001	20	6	14	0	139	190	12	9th OLA-B East	DNQ
2002	22	5	17	0	168	253	10	9th OLA-B East	DNQ
2003	20	2	18	0	128	252	4	13th OLA-B East	DNQ
2004	20	1	19	0	96	307	2	11th OLA-B East	DNQ
2005	20	0	20	0	101	350	0	11th OLA-B East	DNQ
2006	20	2	18	0	133	253	4	12th OLA-B East	DNQ
2007	20	4	16	0	124	225	8	13th OLA-B East	DNQ
2008	20	6	14	0	141	222	12	10th OLA-B East	DNQ
2009	20	12	8	0	137	157	24	3rd OLA-B East	Lost Conference Quarter-final
2010	20	10	9	1	136	145	21	6th OLA-B East	Lost Conference Quarter-final
2011	20	6	13	1	166	255	13	9th OLA-B East	DNQ
2012	20	6	14	0	158	249	12	9th OLA-B East	DNQ
2013	20	2	17	1	147	231	5	11th OLA-B East	DNQ
2014	20	11	9	0	222	203	22	5th OLA-B East	Lost Conference Quarter-final
