= Welland JrB Raiders =

Welland Raiders JrB
- Sport: Box lacrosse
- Founded: 2001
- League: OLA Junior B Lacrosse League
- Based in: Welland, Ontario
- Arena: Welland Main Arena
- Colours: Green, Gold, and White
- President: Bob Wright
- Head coach: Roman Hill,Jamie Brophy,Matt Skinner
- General manager: Roman Hill
- Captain: Joey Young
- Affiliation: St Catherines Jr A

The Welland Raiders JrB are Junior "B" box lacrosse team from Welland, Ontario, Canada. The Generals play in the OLA Junior B Lacrosse League. They were originally called the Welland Warlords.

== History ==
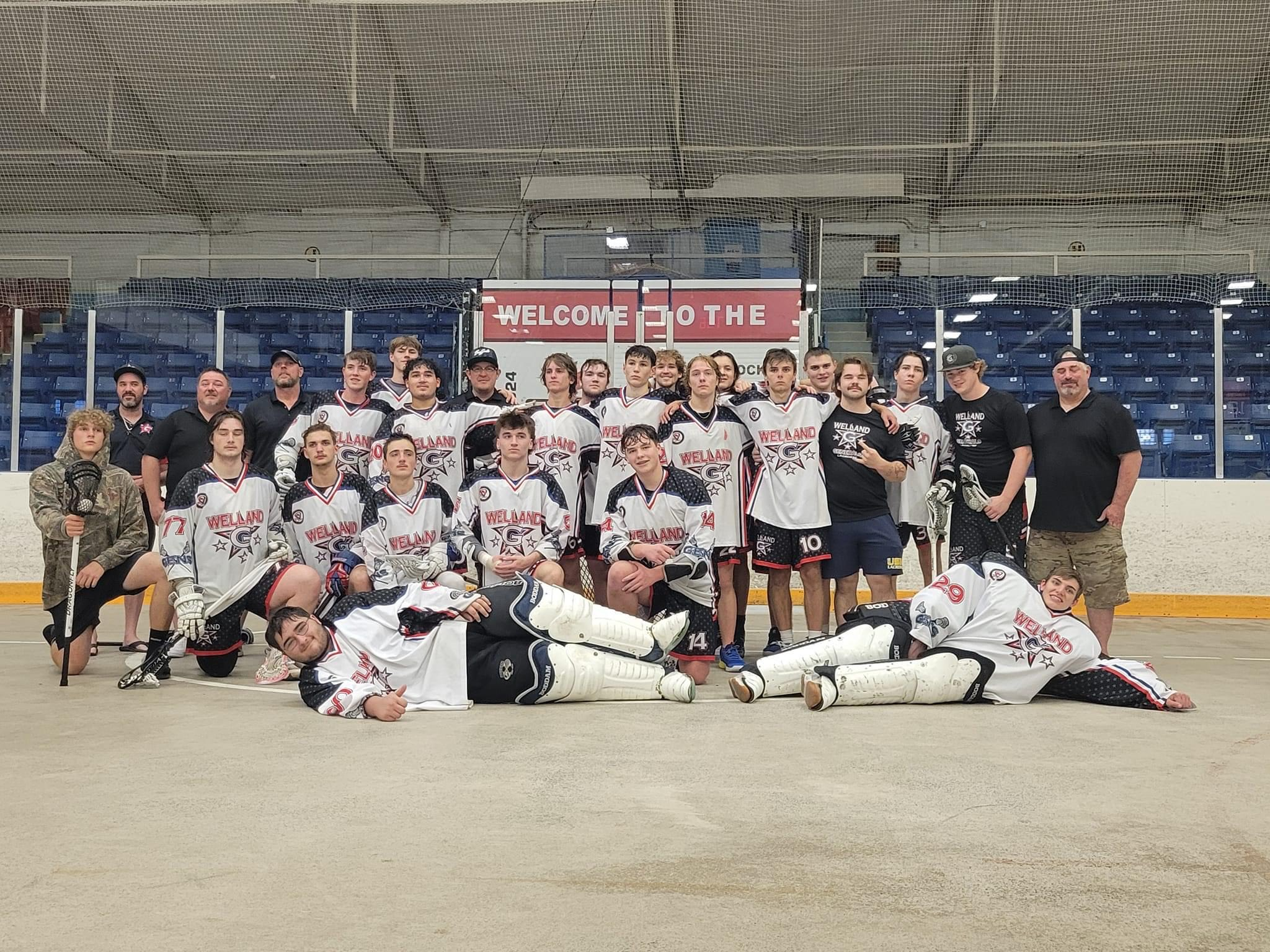
Welland Generals 2024

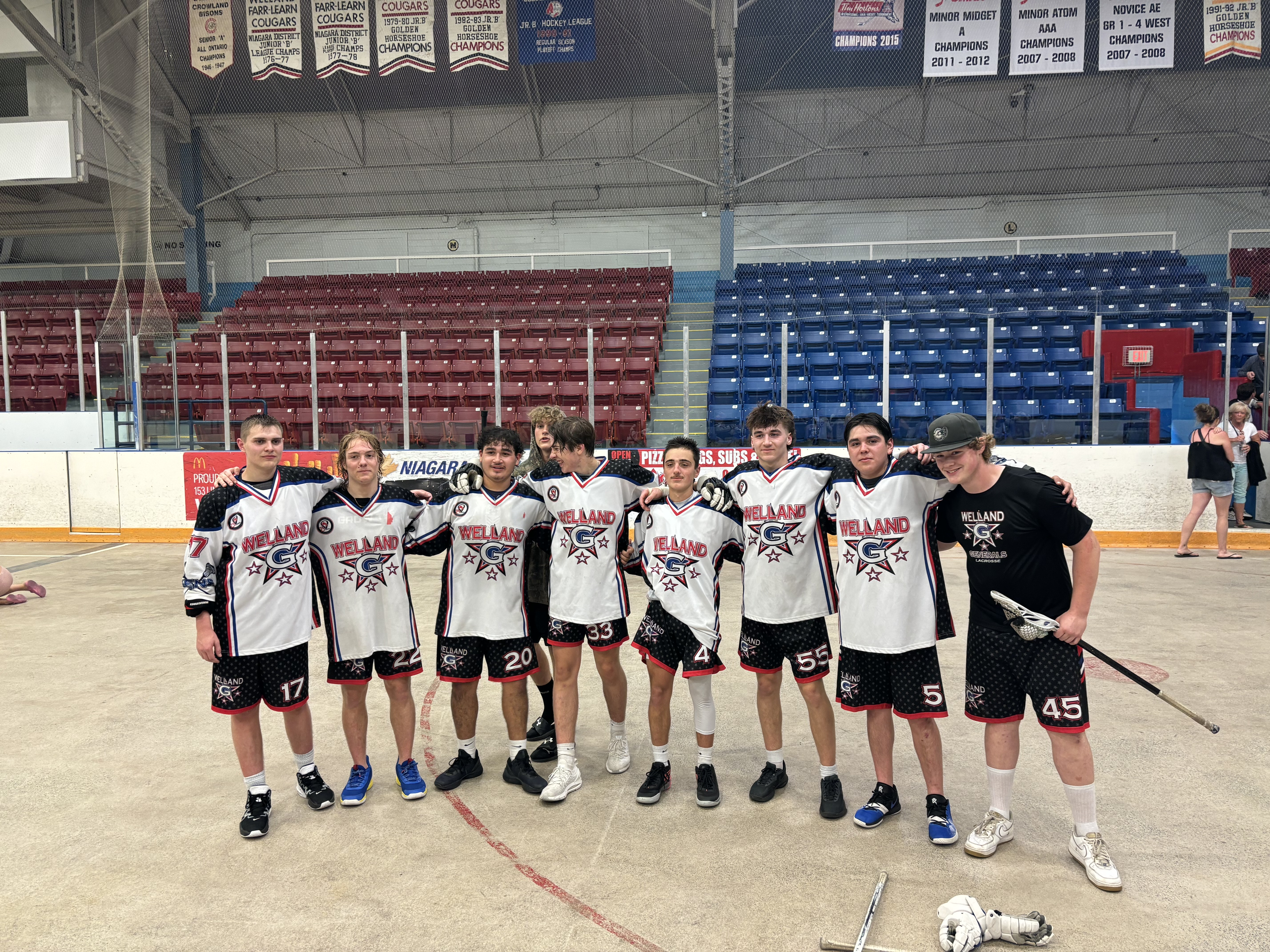
Generals 2024

Founded in 2001 by William (Billy) John House and Louis Savona, the Warlords had two strong seasons from the start. They even made the playoffs those first two seasons. From 2003 until 2006 have been positively dreadful though, capping it off in 2006 with a 0–20–0 record. In a lacrosse hotbed like the Golden Horseshoe it is unfortunate to see Welland suffer through recent seasons. In 2007 they debut new jerseys, sporting the warlord overtop of the background of the Welland river/canal. Also debuting new colours of blue and red. 2008 was a turn-around season for the Warlords as they finished the regular season with a 10–10–0 record and made their first playoff appearance in six years. At the end of the 2008 season Warlords goalie Connor Danko was named Western Conference Rookie of the Year and the Warlords coaching staff was named Western Conference Coaching Staff of the Year.

2009 was the most successful season in franchise history. The Warlords finished the regular season with a 13–6–1 record which was good for fourth in the Western Conference. In the 1st round of the playoffs the Warlords defeated the Guelph Regals 3 games to 1 in a best-of-five series. With this series the team won its first playoff game and series in franchise history. In the second round the Warlords faced the Six Nations Rebels, a team in which they finished tied with in the regular season standings. The Warlords pushed the back-to-back Founder's Cup champions to the brink only to lose in 8–7 in the 5th game to lose the series 3 games to 2. The game was surrounded by controversy as the Warlords launched a protest with the Ontario Lacrosse Association over the use of an illegal player. The decision was that the player was eligible only due to mistakes made by minor lacrosse Zone 9 and the OLA. Following this season the Warlords captain, Kevin Floris, was named the Western Conference Most Valuable Player.

In recent years, the team changed its moniker to the "Generals".

In November of 2024, the Welland JrB Lacrosse Club changed their name from the "Welland Generals" to the "Welland JrB Raiders".

== Season-by-season results ==
Note: GP = Games played, W = Wins, L = Losses, T = Ties, Pts = Points, GF = Goals for, GA = Goals against

Season	GP	W	L	T	GF	GA	PTS	Placing	Playoffs
2001	20	8	10	2	164	173	18	6th OJBLL West	Lost 1st Round
2002	22	10	12	0	197	215	20	7th OJBLL West	Lost 1st Round
2003	20	6	14	0	190	271	12	8th OJBLL West	DNQ
2004	20	1	19	0	120	308	2	12th OJBLL West	DNQ
2005	20	3	17	0	131	274	6	12th OJBLL West	DNQ
2006	20	0	20	0	97	292	0	13th OJBLL West	DNQ
2007	20	0	20	0	101	248	0	13th OJBLL West	DNQ
2008	20	10	10	0	113	128	20	7th OJBLL West	Lost Conference QF
2009	20	13	6	1	133	117	27	4th OJBLL West	Lost Conference SF
2010	20	13	7	0	143	128	26	4th OJBLL West	Lost Conference QF
2011	20	4	15	1	160	221	9	12th OJBLL West	DNQ
2012	20	5	15	0	173	252	10	12th OJBLL West	DNQ
2013	20	7	12	1	195	229	15	10th OJBLL West	DNQ
2014	20	7	12	1	195	226	15	8th OJBLL West	Lost Conference QF
2015	20	4	16	0	145	240	8	12th OJBLL West	DNQ
2016	20	2	17	1	137	278	5	12th OJBLL West	DNQ
2017	20	3	17	0	150	307	6	12th OJBLL West	DNQ
2018	20	1	19	0	140	275	2	13th OJBLL West	DNQ
2019	20	1	19	0	147	278	2	12th OJBLL West	DNQ
