= Three Nations Senior Lacrosse League =

- Sport: Box lacrosse
- Founded: 2009
- No. of teams: 4
- Confederation: First Nations Lacrosse Association
- Most recent champion: Snake Island Muskies (2026)
- Most titles: Snake Island Muskies (9)
- Website: gamesheetstats.com/seasons/14925/standings

The Three Nations Senior Lacrosse League (TNSLL) is a Senior B box lacrosse league based out of Ontario, sanctioned by the First Nations Lacrosse Association (FNLA). The league champion earns a spot in the Presidents Cup, the national championship of Senior B lacrosse in Canada.

== History ==
=== 2009 ===
Akwesasne Thunderbirds, Cornwall Island Redmen and Massena Muskies played an inter-league schedule with the Quebec Senior Lacrosse League (QSLL). Cornwall swept Akwesasne in three-straight games (7-5; 16-6; 11-10) in the opening round before being swept in the finals (9-7; 14-4; 9-5) by Massena.

=== 2010 ===
Snake Island Muskies (formerly Massena) swept their opening round playoff series (20-2; 22-6; 17-13) to meet the Redmen in the finals. Cornwall Island won in three-straight games (9-5; 6-5; 10-3).

=== 2011 ===
The league grew to four teams with the addition of Caughnawaga Indians (previously competed in Circuit Québécois de Crosse) and St. Regis Braves.

The Muskies got some revenge from the previous seasons by knocking out the Redmen four-games-to-two (5-13; 9-8; 13-7; 8-4; 9-10; 13-7). In the finals Snake Island upset top seed St. Regis in five games (9-5; 11-13; 8-7; 8-12; 8-7). Both teams would advance to the Presidents Cup with the Braves playing host in Akwesasne.

In the round robin St. Regis Braves went a perfect 6-0 while the Muskies 4-2-1 record was second-best. The Braves defeated Snake Island 11-8 in the gold medal game.

=== 2012 ===
St. Regis swept the Redmen in four games (16-11; 15-8; 20-7; forfeit) in the league finals. The Braves would go on to win their second-straight Presidents Cup.

=== 2013 ===
Three teams made up the TNSLL (St. Regis Braves went on hiatus). Snake Island Muskies were the top seed in the Wally Roundpoint Memorial Cup playoffs. They would face the Caughnawaga Indians, who they narrowly topped for the top spot, in a best-of seven finals as the Indians eliminated the Redmen (17-8; 12-10; 9-8). A four games-to-one series (6-11; 12-10; 15-11; 11-10; 8-6) win earned Caughnawaga Indians a spot in the Presidents Cup.

Notable players from the champion Caughnawaga Indians included the Thompson brothers (Jeremy, Jerome, Miles and Lyle) cousin Ty Thompson. Miles and Lyle went on to be named co-winners of the 2014 Tewaraaton Award after their season with the University at Albany.

=== 2014 ===
The regular season included an 18-game schedule, each team playing the other six times. Snake Island Muskies (14-4) won the regular season, finishing just ahead of second place Akwesasne Outlawz (13-5). Caughnawaga Indians (7-11) and Tyendinaga Wolfpack (2-16) finished well behind the top two.

Snake Island easily got past the Wolpack (23-12; 20-7; forfeit) while the Muskies eliminated Caughnawaga (29-4; 20-5; forfeit). The best-of five championship series was won by Akwesasne after a thrilling four-games (8-9, 9-8, 13-9, 10-7) with Snake Island.

=== 2015 ===
With the Akwesasne and Caughnawaga both on hiatus, Snake Island Muskies (9-7) and Tyendinaga Wolfpack (0-6) played an inter-league schedule against QSLL teams. The TNSLL championship was contested in a one-game playoff on August 8 at Deseronto Community Recreation Centre, won by the Muskies 21-9.

=== 2016 ===
Two teams (Caughnawaga Indians, St. Regis Braves) returned while three-time champion Snake Island Muskies went on hiatus. Tyendinaga changed their name from Wolfpack to Thunderbirds.

Tyendinaga eliminated Caughnawaga in three straight to earn a spot in the finals. The Thunderbirds went on to upset St. Regis in the finals to earn their first-ever berth to Presidents Cup.

=== 2023 ===
TNSLL saw growth for the 2023 season with the Akwesasne Bucks (formerly of Can-Am Lacrosse) and Capital Region Axemen (Quebec Senior Lacrosse League) switching leagues. Cornwall Island Redmen also returned after a 10-year hiatus.

== Teams ==
Team	City	Arena	First Year
Akwesasne Bucks	Akwesasne	Aʼnowaraʼko꞉wa Arena	2023
Capital Region Axemen	Ottawa, Ontario	Bell Centennial Arena	2023
Kahnawake Mohawks	Kahnawake, Quebec	Kahnawake Sports Complex	2024
Snake Island Muskies	Akwesasne	Aʼnowaraʼko꞉wa Arena	2009

=== Former member teams ===
- Akwesasne Outlawz (2014)
- Akwesasne Thunderbirds (2009-10)
- Caughnawaga Indians (2011-14; 2016-18)
- Cornwall Island Redmen (2009-13; 2023-2024)
- St. Regis Braves (2009-12;2016-18)
- Tyendinaga Wolfpack/Thunderbirds (2014-17)

== Champions ==
Season	Playoffs winner	Finalist	Result
2009	Massena Muskies	Cornwall Island Redmen	3-0 (best-of 5)
2010	Cornwall Island Redmen	Snake Island Muskies	3-0 (best-of 5)
2011	Snake Island Muskies	St. Regis Braves	3-2 (best-of 5)
2012	St. Regis Braves	Cornwall Island Redmen	4-0 (best-of 7)
2013	Caughnawaga Indians	Snake Island Muskies	4-1 (best-of 7)
2014	Akwesasne Outlawz	Snake Island Muskies	3-1 (best-of 5)
2015	Snake Island Muskies	Tyendinaga Wolfpack	21-9
2016	Tyendinaga Thunderbirds	St. Regis Braves	3-1 (best-of 5)
2017	St. Regis Braves	Tyendinaga Thunderbirds	4-2 (best-of 7)
2018	Caughnawaga Indians	St. Regis Braves	Braves forfeit
2019	Snake Island Muskies	not contested	---
2022	Snake Island Muskies	not contested	---
2023	Snake Island Muskies	Akwesasne Bucks	4-3 (best-of 7)
2024	Snake Island Muskies	Capital Region Axemen	2-0 (best-of-3)
2025	Snake Island Muskies	Kahnawake Mohawks	4-0 (best-of 7)
2026	Snake Island Muskies	Akwesasne Bucks	3-1 (best-of 5)

== Presidents Cup medal history ==
Year	Team (medal)	Team (medal)
2011	St. Regis Braves (GOLD)	Snake Island Muskies (SILVER)
2012	St. Regis Braves (GOLD)	
2013	Caughnawaga Indians (SILVER)	
2018	Caughnawaga Indians (BRONZE)	
2025	Snake Island Muskies (GOLD)	
2026	Snake Island Muskies (SILVER)	

== Championship results by team ==
Teams	Wins	Years won
Snake Island/Massena Muskies	9	2009, 2011, 2015, 2019, 2022, 2023, 2024, 2025, 2026
Caughnawaga Indians	2	2013, 2018
St. Regis Braves	2	2012, 2017
Akwesasne Outlawz	1	2014
Cornwall Island Redmen	1	2010
Tyendinaga Thunderbirds	1	2016
