= Akwesasne Warriors =

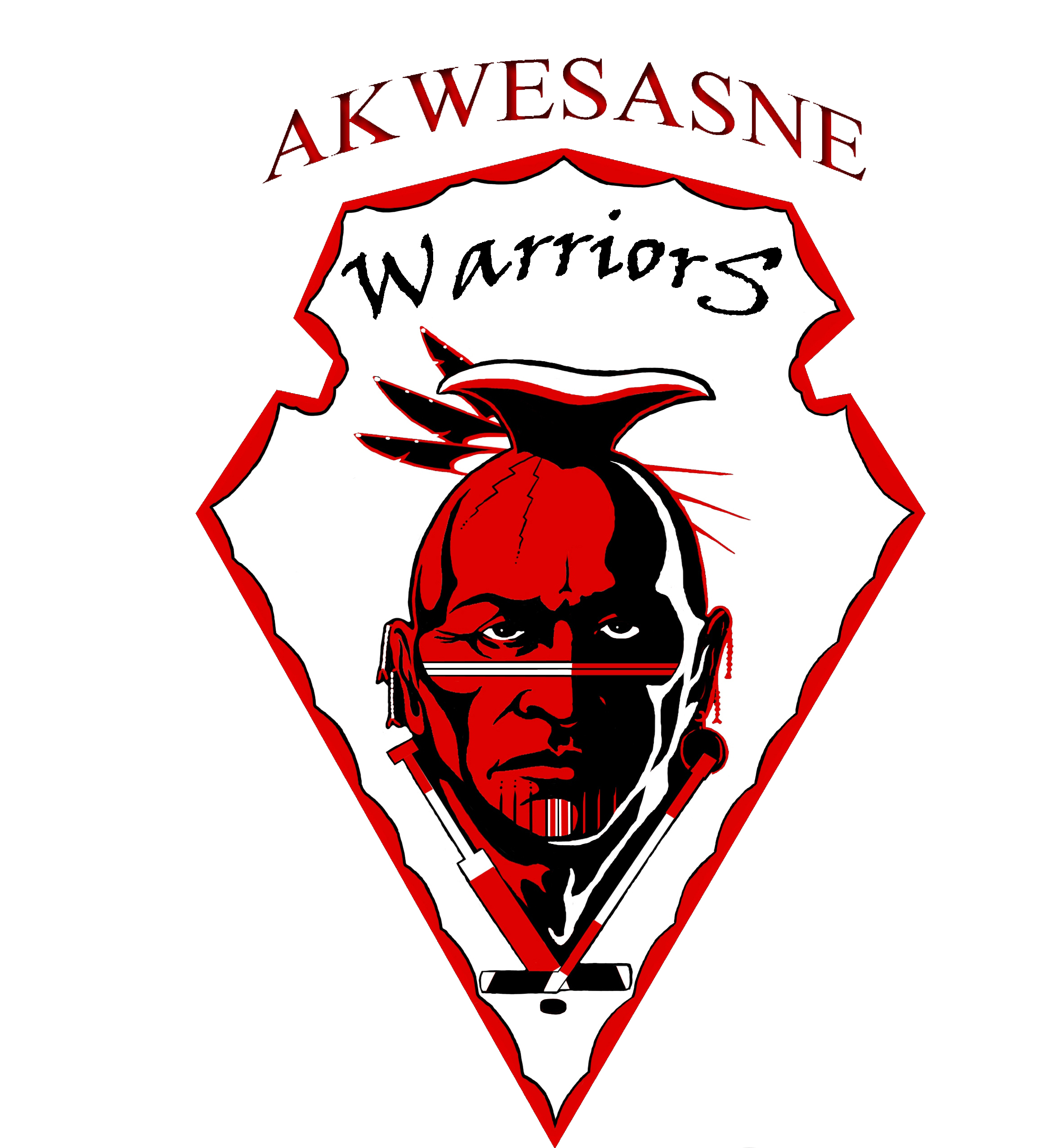
- City: Akwesasne, Ontario
- League: Federal Hockey League
- Founded: 2010
- Folded: 2012
- Home arena: Aʼnowaraʼko꞉wa Arena
- Colours: red, black, white
- Owner: Basem Awwad
- General manager: Basem Awwad
- Media: Cornwall Standard Freeholder; CKON

Franchise history
- 2010–2012: Akwesasne Warriors

Championships
- Playoff championships: 1 (2011)

The Akwesasne Warriors were a minor league professional ice hockey team in the Federal Hockey League from 2010 to 2012. Based at Akwesasne in the Mohawk Nation (Kanien'kehá:ka) Territory (near Cornwall, Ontario), the Warriors played at the Aʼnowaraʼko꞉wa Arena.

== NHL Alumni players ==
- Pierre Dagenais
