= Earl Armstrong Arena =

Indoor arena in Ottawa, Ontario, Canada

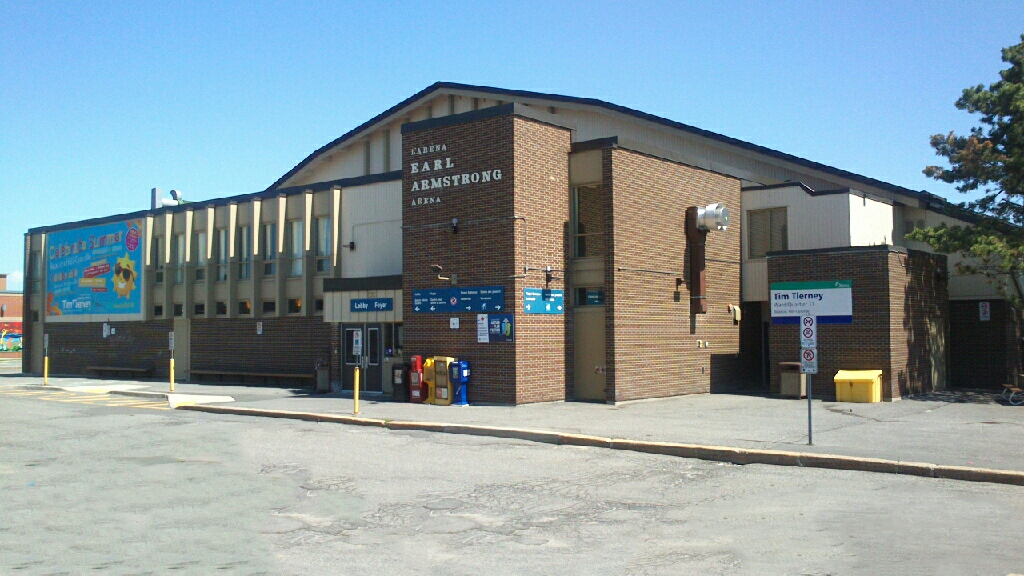
- Interactive map of Earl Armstrong Arena
- Address: 2020 Ogilvie Road; Ottawa, Ontario; K1J 7N8
- Coordinates: 45.437619°N 75.601328°W
- Owner: City of Ottawa
- Operator: City of Ottawa
- Capacity: 2300 + 1200 standing room
- Surface: Multi-surface

Construction
- Opened: November 1971
- Renovated: 1984, 2014
- Expanded: 1988

Tenants
- Gloucester Rangers; Gloucester Griffins; Gloucester Gators

The Earl Armstrong Arena is an indoor arena in Ottawa, Ontario, Canada. It is used as an ice hockey arena in the winter to house the Ottawa Canadians Jr. team and in the summer uses its slab for lacrosse where the Gloucester Griffins Jr "B" team call home. It is located in the former city of Gloucester, at 2020 Ogilvy Road, adjacent to Gloucester High School. It is named after Reeve Earl Armstrong of Gloucester township.

The area was host to the first, inaugural World Ringette Championships at the 1990 World Ringette Championships. A Canadian team, Team Alberta, took home the gold medal and the Sam Jacks Trophy whose design was changed in 1996.

== History ==
During the month of May 1971, the Earl Armstrong Arena opens including the Ogilvie Road branch of the Public Library.

Immediately following its opening the Ottawa M&W Rangers moved from the then named Leitrim Arena and finished their regular season and playoff run there. The newly completed arena proves lucky as the Rangers draw record crowds and finish their season in 1st place. They continue to not only win the league championship but the National championship as well which was then known as the Centennial Cup (RBC Cup today).

In 1975, the Gloucester Fair opens for the first time at the Earl Armstrong Arena. It relocated to Rideau-Carleton Raceway in 1997.

On June 18, North Gloucester Branch of Public Library opens at 2036 Ogilvie Road. The former location in the Earl Armstrong Arena closed on May 15, 1984.

On January 15, 1988, the Gloucester "Splash" Wave Pool, the first indoor wave pool in Eastern Canada opens. This was formerly Centennial Pool. The pool is located behind the Earl Armstrong Arena.

In January 1988, the Gloucester Senior Adults Centre opens at Earl Armstrong Arena.

== Facilities ==
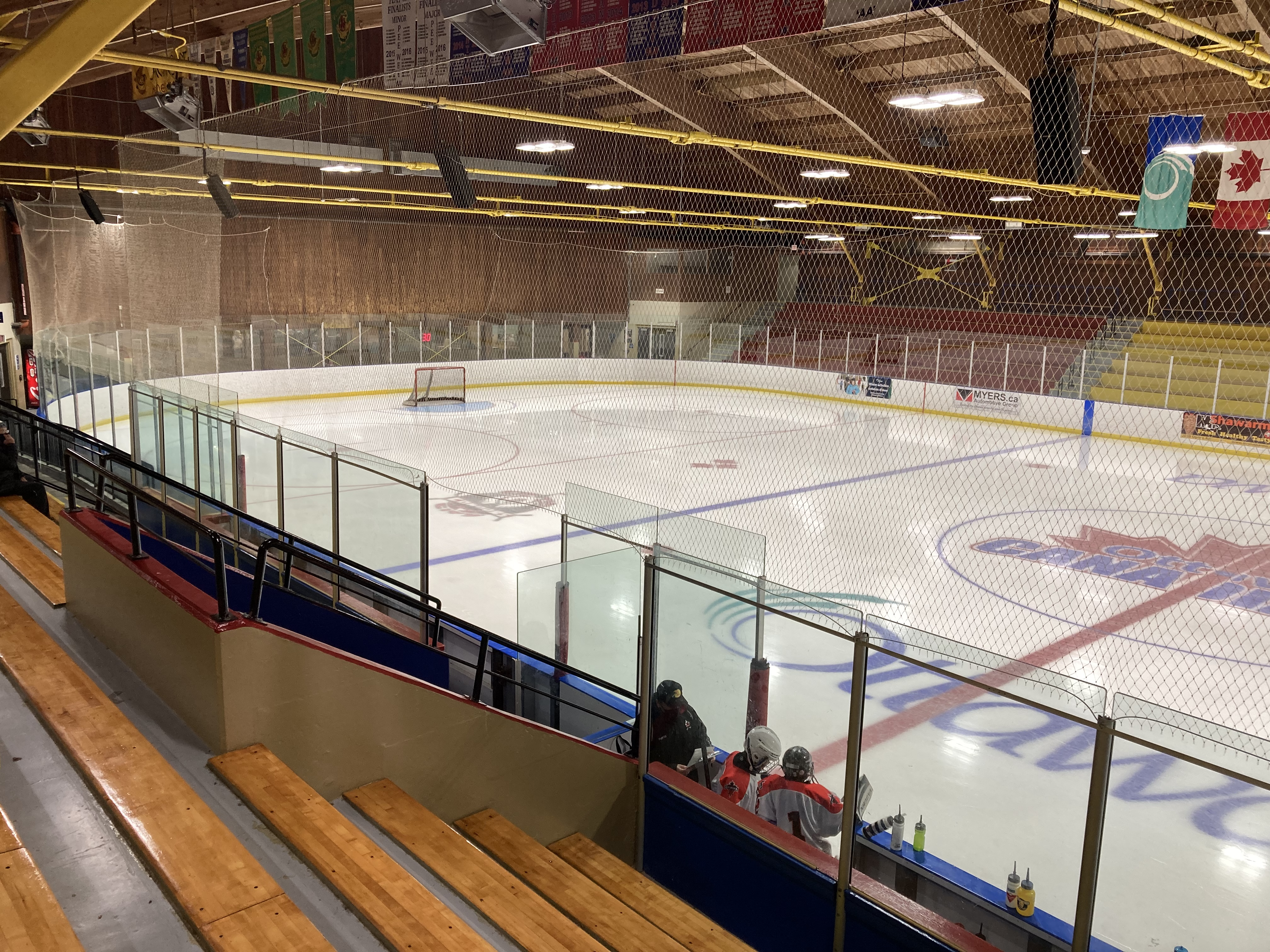
Indoor ice hockey rink in 2021

Today the Earl Armstrong Arena host the Gloucester Rangers Jr "A" hockey team as well as the Rangers minor hockey program. Several other teams from the Gloucester Hockey Association play here between September 1 and April 10 of each year.

In April the ice surface is removed to make way for the lacrosse season ant the Gloucester Griffins Minor Lacrosse Association as well as the Gloucester Griffins Jr "B" program.

== Notable events ==
The first World Ringette Championships took place here, the 1990 World Ringette Championships. The winning team was Canadian.

The Central Canada Hockey League has held its annual draft there for five straight seasons, from 2011 to 2016.

The arena played host to the 1987 Purolator Cup, National Midget Hockey Championships. It was also the home arena for the two most successful Gloucester Rangers minor hockey clubs. In 1989 (1973 births) and 1991 (1975 births) the clubs won the Ottawa District Championships and then went on to capture the All-Ontario Provincial Championships at the Major Bantam AA level (no AAA in Ottawa at that time). That 1989 provincial championship was hosted by the Rangers at the Earl Armstrong Arena.

Great North Wrestling came to the venue on August 8, 2008 in with an event featuring former WWE stars Bushwacker Luke, The Honky Tonk Man and Hannibal. Great North Wrestling returned to the Earl Armstrong Arena on August 8, 2009 in an event once again featuring Hannibal.

Great North Wrestling will be returning to the arena on May 30, 2015 with a card featuring Brutus The Barber Beefcake, Hannibal and Canadian Senator Patrick Brazeau as reported in The National Post.
