= Pierre Dagenais =

Canadian ice hockey player (born 1978)

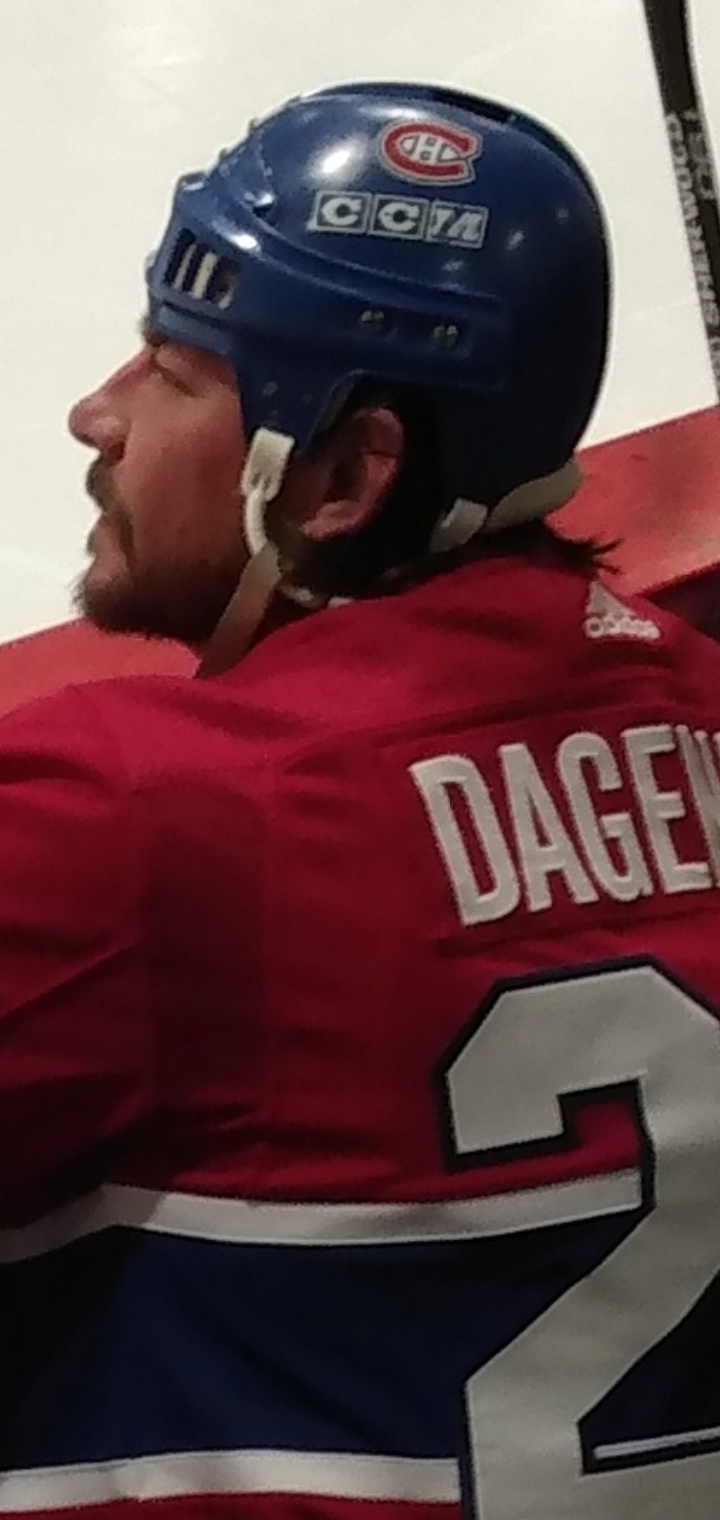
- Born: March 4, 1978 (age 48) Blainville, Quebec, Canada
- Height: 6 ft 3 in (191 cm)
- Weight: 218 lb (99 kg; 15 st 8 lb)
- Position: Left wing
- Shot: Left
- Played for: New Jersey Devils; Florida Panthers; Montreal Canadiens; Ajoie; Jokerit; HC Innsbruck; Traktor Chelyabinsk; Vålerenga
- NHL draft: 47th overall, 1996; New Jersey Devils; 105th overall, 1998; New Jersey Devils
- Playing career: 1998–2012

Pierre Brüno Dagenais (born March 4, 1978) is a Canadian former professional ice hockey player who most notably played in the National Hockey League (NHL). He last played for the Akwesasne Warriors of the Federal Hockey League.

== Playing career ==
=== Amateur ===
As a youth, Dagenais played in the 1991 Quebec International Pee-Wee Hockey Tournament with a minor ice hockey team from Mille-Îles in Laval, Quebec.

Dagenais began his junior career after being drafted by the Moncton Alpines of the Quebec Major Junior Hockey League (QMJHL) when he was 17 years old. He quickly became a young star on his team, leading the team in points and goals in his rookie campaign in the 1995-96 season. Dagenais was drafted 47th overall in the 1996 NHL Entry Draft by the New Jersey Devils, but remained in the QMJHL.

Six games into the following season, Dagenais was traded to the Laval Titan for Mathieu Letourneau. At mid-season he was traded to the Rouyn-Noranda Huskies for Yanick Hubert and Jean-Philippe Soucy.

In the 1997–98 season, Dagenais led the QMJHL in goals and was second in points. That year Dagenais met Mike Ribeiro, who finished second in points after Pierre. Ribeiro and Dagenais developed a great friendship while playing on the same line throughout the entire season.

In the summer of 1998, Dagenais was once again draft eligible as he had not signed a contract with the Devils, he was then re-drafted by New Jersey with the 105th overall pick in the 1998 NHL entry draft.

=== Professional ===
The 1998–99 season was Dagenais' professional hockey debut. He played with the New Jersey Devils' AHL affiliate, the Albany River Rats. The 1999–00 season was better than his first professional season. He finished among the top scorers in the league with 35 goals.

In 2000–01 season Dagenais was selected to the AHL's second all-star team. He also was called up by the New Jersey Devils and played his first NHL games. In the 2001–02 season he played 16 games with the Devils. He was placed on waivers by New Jersey and claimed by the Florida Panthers. He spent the majority of the remaining season playing for the Panthers. After next year's training camp, he was sent to the Panthers' AHL team, the San Antonio Rampage.

During the summer 2003, the Montreal Canadiens' general manager Bob Gainey surprised some by signing Dagenais to a one-year contract. Dagenais started the 2003–04 season with the Canadiens' AHL affiliate, the Hamilton Bulldogs. He played 50 games on the Habs' second line with Mike Ribeiro and Michael Ryder. The line was the most productive of the team and Dagenais scored 27 points.

During the 2004–05 NHL lockout, Dagenais played 7 games with HC Ajoie in Switzerland. He was also involved in a controversy during the lockout. In an interview, Dagenais stated he wouldn't mind playing under a salary cap, which was in opposition to the NHLPA's stance. In his return to the NHL in 2005–06, Dagenais scored the first game-winning shootout goal in Montreal for the Canadiens on November 22, 2005. With dwindling offensive numbers he was sent back to the Hamilton Bulldogs in January. He became a restricted free agent during the summer of 2006, and signed a tryout contract with Jokerit in the Finnish SM-liiga in October 2006. His tryout lasted until the SM-liiga Christmas break, and the contract was not renewed. He signed a new contract with Austrian team, HC TWK Innsbruck of the Erste Bank Eishockey Liga and had an excellent 2006–07 season, scoring 37 goals in only 27 games. He almost led the league in goals, despite playing only half the year. He re-signed with Innsbruck for 2007–08 season.

In 2008, Dagenais signed with Kontinental Hockey League club, Traktor Chelyabinsk. After potting 14 goals in 40 games in 2008–09, he was re-signed to a one-year contract extension on August 5, 2009.

In 2010, he signed with the Akwesasne Warriors of the Federal Hockey League. Being one of a few Federal League players with NHL experience, Dagenais was able to score on a regular basis. At the time of his departure, he had played 23 games and scored 26 goals and 54 points and still had a share of the scoring lead a month after his departure from the team.

On December 5, Dagenais was listed on the Federal League's site as being recalled to Oslo Elite, a third division team in Austria. The news was reported the following day on ATSE Graz's website. Despite signing a contract, Dagenais said he would not be reporting to ATSE Graz.

On 5 January 2011, Dagenais signed a contract with Norwegian team Vålerenga of the GET-ligaen.

Dagenais now works in real estate in the Montreal area.

== Career statistics ==
			Regular season					Playoffs
Season	Team	League	GP	G	A	Pts	PIM	GP	G	A	Pts	PIM
1995–96	Moncton Alpines	QMJHL	67	43	25	68	59	—	—	—	—	—
1996–97	Moncton Wildcats	QMJHL	6	4	2	6	0	—	—	—	—	—
1996–97	Laval Titan Collège Français	QMJHL	37	16	14	30	22	—	—	—	—	—
1996–97	Rouyn-Noranda Huskies	QMJHL	27	21	8	29	22	—	—	—	—	—
1997–98	Rouyn-Noranda Huskies	QMJHL	60	66	67	133	50	6	6	2	8	2
1998–99	Albany River Rats	AHL	69	17	13	30	37	4	0	0	0	0
1999–00	Albany River Rats	AHL	80	35	30	65	47	5	1	0	1	14
2000–01	Albany River Rats	AHL	69	34	28	62	52	—	—	—	—	—
2000–01	New Jersey Devils	NHL	9	3	2	5	6	—	—	—	—	—
2001–02	Albany River Rats	AHL	6	0	2	2	2	—	—	—	—	—
2001–02	New Jersey Devils	NHL	16	3	3	6	4	—	—	—	—	—
2001–02	Utah Grizzlies	AHL	4	1	1	2	2	—	—	—	—	—
2001–02	Florida Panthers	NHL	26	7	1	8	4	—	—	—	—	—
2002–03	San Antonio Rampage	AHL	49	21	14	35	28	3	2	0	2	2
2002–03	Florida Panthers	NHL	9	0	0	0	4	—	—	—	—	—
2003–04	Hamilton Bulldogs	AHL	20	12	9	21	19	—	—	—	—	—
2003–04	Montreal Canadiens	NHL	50	17	10	27	24	8	0	1	1	6
2004–05	Ajoie	NLB	7	5	5	10	12	—	—	—	—	—
2005–06	Montreal Canadiens	NHL	32	5	7	12	16	—	—	—	—	—
2005–06	Hamilton Bulldogs	AHL	38	12	13	25	23	—	—	—	—	—
2006–07	Jokerit	SM-l	16	2	7	9	12	—	—	—	—	—
2006–07	HC TWK Innsbruck	EBEL	27	37	20	57	12	—	—	—	—	—
2007–08	HC TWK Innsbruck	EBEL	44	23	17	40	18	3	1	0	1	0
2008–09	Traktor Chelyabinsk	KHL	40	14	5	19	28	3	1	0	1	10
2009–10	Traktor Chelyabinsk	KHL	54	9	11	20	44	4	2	0	2	6
2010–11	Vålerenga	GET	12	11	1	12	8	5	0	0	0	14
2010–11	Akwesasne Warriors	FHL	23	26	28	54	6	4	7	2	9	6
2011–12	Akwesasne Warriors	FHL	45	81	62	143	89	2	0	3	3	15
NHL totals			142	35	23	58	58	8	0	1	1	6
