= Victory Trophy =

The Victory Trophy is the Canadian Senior Division II Field Lacrosse Championship of Canada. The championship is held by the Canadian Lacrosse Association and features men's teams from across Canada.

== Champions ==
- 1985 Manitoba
- 1986 Manitoba
- 1987 Edmonton
- 1988 South Fraser
- 1989 Calgary
- 1990 No Champion
- 1991 Oshawa
- 1992 Vancouver
- 1993 Edmonton
- 1994 Vancouver
- 1995 Manitoba
- 1996 Alberta
- 1997 Victoria
- 1998 Saskatchewan
- 1999 Wakefield
- 2000 Saskatchewan
- 2001 Saskatchewan
- 2002 Saskatchewan
- 2003 Saskatchewan
- 2004 Saskatchewan
- 2005 Molly Bloom
- 2006 Tri-City
- 2007 Ladner Pioneers
- 2008 Black Sheep
- 2009 Burlington Lakers
- 2010 Toronto Maple Leafs
- 2011 Calgary Raiders
- 2012 Edmonton
- 2013 Centre Wellington
