= Niagara Thunderhawks =

- Sport: Box lacrosse
- Founded: 2003
- Folded: 2021
- League: OLA Junior B Lacrosse League
- Based in: Niagara, Ontario
- Arena: Meridian Credit Union Arena
- Colours: Blue, Black, and White
- Head coach: Randy Chrysler
- General manager: Al Janzen

The Niagara Thunderhawks were a Junior "B" box lacrosse team from Niagara, Ontario, Canada. The Thunderhawks played in the OLA Junior B Lacrosse League. The franchise folded after 18 years in 2021.

== History ==
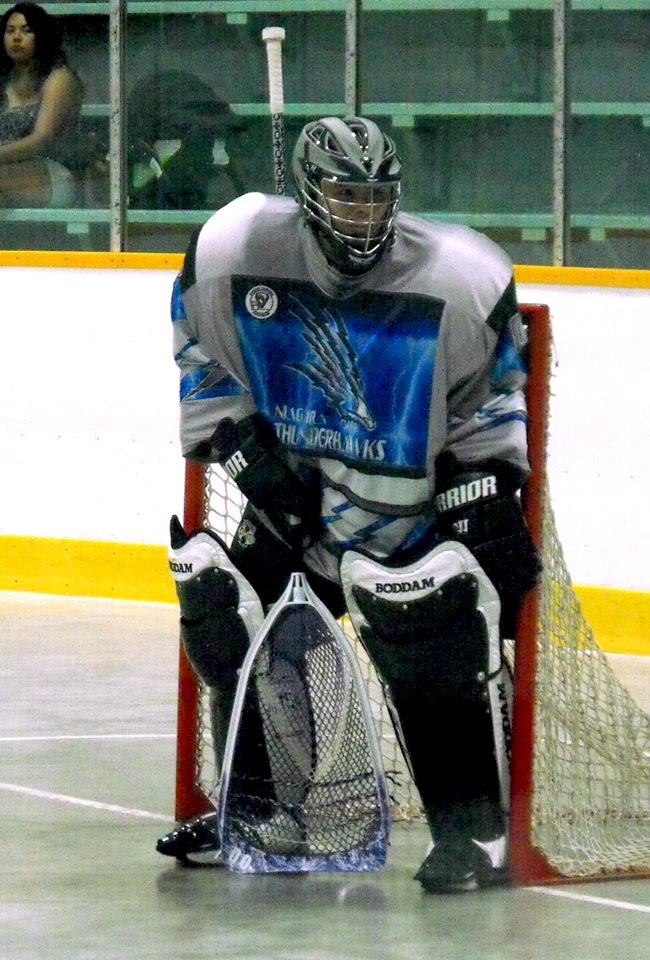
Thunderhawks goalie in 2014.

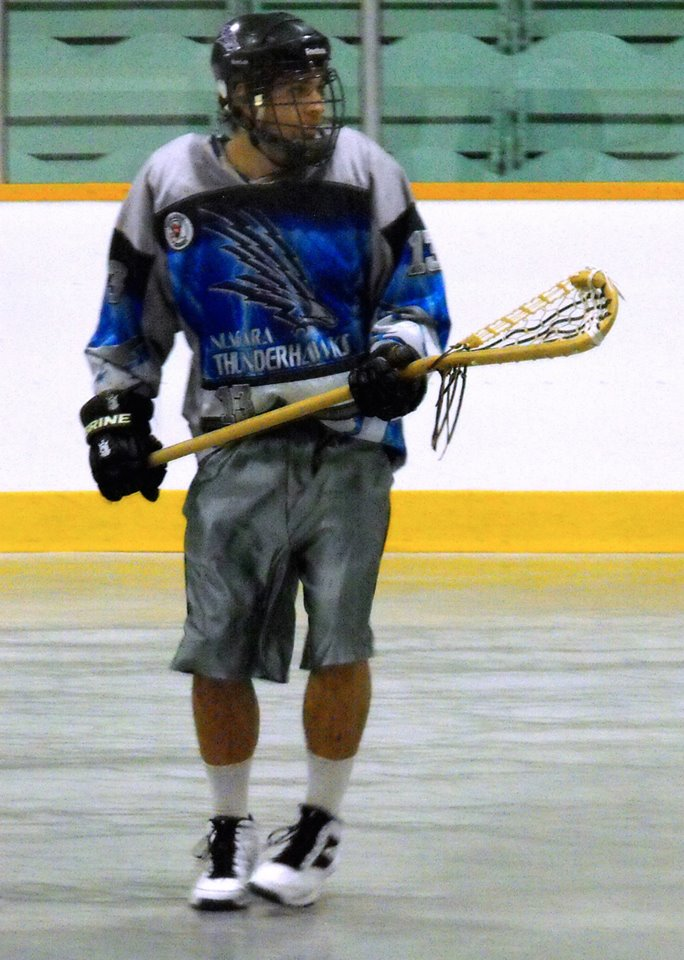
Thunderhawks player in 2014.

The Thunderhawks entered the OLA in 2003. After a slow but modest start, Niagara broke out with a .500 record in 2005 and earned their first birth into the playoffs. Success really came in 2006 as the Thunderhawks finished 15-5-0 and finished in second place overall in the West Conference. They beat out the upstart Hamilton Bengals in the first round 3 games straight. In the second round they faced the more challenging Windsor Fratmen where they went the distance, winning 3 games to 2. The Semi-final went the distance as well, as they faced the Orangeville Northmen, but this time they were eliminated in five games.

In 2021 the Thunderhawks announced they would be ceasing operations. The announcement cited a lack of available players as a reason for the teams folding. However the teams legacy lives on through Niagara-on-the-Lake's minor lacrosse teams which still use the name "Niagara Thunderhawks" as well as their logo and colours.

Season-by-season results== Note: GP = Games played, W = Wins, L = Losses, T = Ties, Pts = Points, GF = Goals for, GA = Goals against

Season	GP	W	L	T	GF	GA	PTS	Placing	Playoffs
2003	20	6	14	0	151	195	12	9th OJBLL West	DNQ
2004	20	6	14	0	142	185	12	10th OJBLL West	DNQ
2005	20	10	9	1	166	165	21	7th OJBLL West	Lost 1st round
2006	20	15	5	0	194	118	30	2nd OJBLL West	Lost semi-final
2007	20	13	7	0	176	147	26	6th OJBLL West	Lost 1st round
2008	20	6	14	0	157	206	12	12th OJBLL West	DNQ
2009	20	2	17	1	95	180	5	14th OJBLL West	DNQ
2010	20	5	15	0	99	155	10	12th OJBLL West	DNQ
2011	20	6	14	0	173	225	10	10th OJBLL West	DNQ
2012	20	11	9	0	219	197	22	8th OJBLL West	Lost Conference QF
2013	20	13	7	0	223	179	26	4th OJBLL West	Lost Conference SF
2014	20	16	4	0	204	174	32	4th OJBLL West	Lost Conference SF
2015	20	17	3	0	218	132	34	2nd OJBLL West	Lost Conference SF
2016	20	15	4	1	214	146	31	3rd OJBLL West	Lost Conference SF
2017	20	8	12	0	187	218	16	9th OJBLL West	DNQ
2018	20	10	10	0	183	188	20	7th OJBLL West	Lost Conference QF
