= Aʼnowaraʼko꞉wa Arena =

Multi-purpose arena in Cornwall Island, Ontario

Coordinates: 45.0063°N 74.7305°W

- Interactive map of Aʼnowaraʼko꞉wa Arena
- Location: 36 Arena Road, Akwesasne, Ontario, Canada
- Capacity: 3,000

Construction
- Opened: 1995

Tenants
- Akwesasne Chiefs (CPJHL) 2016–2017; Akwesasne Lightning/Indians (OJBLL) 1996–present Akwesasne Wolves (EOJHL) 1998–2015; Akwesasne Warriors (FHL) 2010–2012

Aʼnowaraʼko꞉wa Arena is a 3,000-seat multi-purpose arena in Cornwall Island, Ontario on the Akwesasne Mohawk reservation.

== History ==
Built in 1995, it is home to hockey and lacrosse games. Current tenants include the Akwesasne Indians of the Ontario Junior B Lacrosse League.

The Akwesasne Warriors of the Federal Hockey League played at the arena until the team dissolved in 2012.

The National Lacrosse League hosted three preseason games at the arena in November 2022.
