= Guelph Regals =

- Sport: Box lacrosse
- Founded: 1992
- League: Ontario Junior B Lacrosse League
- Based in: Guelph, Ontario
- Arena: Victoria Road Recreation Centre, 151 Victoria Road North, Guelph, Ontario
- Colours: Red, Blue, and White
- Head coach: Al Burton
- General manager: Matt Pelkey

The Guelph Regals are a box lacrosse team from Guelph, Ontario, Canada. The Regals play in the Ontario Junior B Lacrosse League.

== History ==
The team was founded in 1992.

== Season-by-season results ==
Note: GP = Games played, W = Wins, L = Losses, T = Ties, Pts = Points, GF = Goals for, GA = Goals against

Season	GP	W	L	T	GF	GA	PTS	Placing	Playoffs
1992	20	9	11	0	198	251	18	7th OLA-B	Lost quarter-final
1993	22	12	9	1	201	236	25	5th OLA-B	Lost quarter-final
1994	22	8	13	1	219	261	17	8th OLA-B	Lost quarter-final
1995	22	14	8	0	259	250	28	2nd OLA-B West	Lost quarter-final
1996	22	5	17	0	178	293	10	8th OLA-B West	DNQ
1997	22	12	10	0	270	235	24	4th OLA-B West	Lost quarter-final
1998	24	13	10	1	278	255	27	5th OLA-B West	Won Tier II Title
1999	21	7	14	0	175	225	14	8th OLA-B West	Lost 1st round
2000	21	2	19	0	153	248	4	8th OLA-B West	DNQ
2001	20	5	15	0	165	245	10	9th OLA-B West	DNQ
2002	22	6	16	0	216	255	12	10th OLA-B West	DNQ
2003	20	6	13	1	189	225	13	7th OLA-B West	Lost 1st round
2004	20	9	10	1	207	201	19	7th OLA-B West	Lost 1st round
2005	20	14	6	0	212	147	28	3rd OLA-B West	Lost 1st round
2006	20	12	8	0	162	162	24	5th OLA-B West	Lost 1st round
2007	20	3	16	1	123	215	7	11th OLA-B West	DNQ
2008	20	7	13	0	128	183	14	10th OLA-B West	DNQ - Founders Cup Silver Medalist
2009	20	12	6	2	155	119	26	5th OLA-B West	Lost 1st round
2010	20	4	14	2	117	185	10	13th OLA-B West	DNQ
2011	20	11	8	1	210	201	23	6th OLA-B West	Lost 1st round
2012	20	13	7	0	228	201	26	6th OLA-B West	Lost Conference Quarter-Finals
2013	20	6	14	0	202	275	12	11th OLA-B West	DNQ
2014	20	1	17	2	133	304	4	14th OLA-B West	DNQ
2015	20	10	9	1	184	167	21	6th OLA-B West	Lost 1st round
2016	20	11	9	0	175	161	22	6th OLA-B West	Lost 1st round
2017	20	4	16	0	129	254	8	11th OLA-B West	DNQ
2018	20	4	15	1	145	258	9	10th OLA-B West	DNQ
2019	20	6	12	2	154	163	14	8th OLA-B West	Lost 1st round

                                    2018 Roster 

Number	Name	Position	Height	Weight	Birth Date	Hometown
1	Cole Martin	G	5-10	170	2001	Guelph
2	David Pavlinich	D	6-2	205	2000	Kitchener
4	Joel Hoogaars	D	E	E	2000	Guelph
6	Gavin Lag	O	6-4	195	2001	Kitchener
7	Carter TenEycke	T	5-10	170	2000	Cambridge
8	Cole Elford	D	5-10	175	2000	Guelph
9	Liam Holwell	O	6-1	175	2000	Cambridge
10	Carter McGrath	O	5-7	155	2001	Guelph
12	Luke Kivell	D	6-4	215	1999	Cambridge
14	Jayden Bushey	O	5-10	190	2001	Elora
15	Cohen Campbell	O	5-10	145	1999	Cambridge
16	Trenten Hitchcock	T	6-2	195	2001	Guelph
17	Tyler Dunk	D	5-10	170	2000	Guelph
18	Shane Halliwell	O	6-3	180	2001	Cambridge
19	Zach Sanders	D	6-3	230	1997	Tilsonburg
20	Callyn Martin	T	6-3	185	2001	Guelph
22	Reed Kurtz	T	5-10	190	2001	Guelph
23	Jean-Luc Vereecke	O	5-11	175	2001	Flamborough
24	Mitchell Zulian	O	5-10	155	2000	Burlington
26	Curtis Webb	D	6	200	1997	Guelph
27	Jack Burke	D	5-11	175	1999	Guelph
30	Chris Wood	G	5-8	150	1999	St Thomas

== Founders Cup ==
CANADIAN NATIONAL CHAMPIONSHIPS

Year	Round Robin	Record W-L-T	Standing	Semifinal	Bronze Medal Game	Gold Medal Game
2008; HOST	W, Montreal Shamrocks 13-0; W, Calgary Shamrocks 12-3; W, Nova Scotia Gryphons 12-3; W, Iroquois Nation 9-5; W, South Edmonton Warriors 8-4	5-0-0	1st of 6 Pool A	W, Iroquois Nation 8-1	N/A	L, Six Nations Rebels 7-8
