= Quebec Senior Lacrosse League =

- Sport: box lacrosse
- Founded: 2002
- Folded: 2023
- No. of teams: 0
- Last champion: Capital Region Axemen (2022)
- Most titles: Kahnawake Mohawks (9)
- Website: http://qslltnsll.lacrosseshift.com

The Quebec Senior Lacrosse League (QSLL) was a senior B box lacrosse league based in Quebec. The league also includes a team based in Ottawa. QSLL is sanctioned by the Fédération de crosse du Québec.

Winners of the league advance to compete in the Presidents Cup tournament, the national championship of Senior B box lacrosse in Canada.

The Kahnawake Mohawks have since moved to the Three Nations Senior Lacrosse League.

Those still looking for lacrosse in Quebe, can check out Circuit Provincial de Crosse Sénior. It is a Senior C level lacrosse leauge.

== Presidents' Cup history ==
Kahnawake Mohawks have a long history, representing the Iroquois Lacrosse Association (now FNLA) at the Presidents' Cup tournament six times before the formation of the QSLL. The Mohawks were silver medallists in 1968, 1979 and 2016 as well as bronze medallists in 1987, 1996 and 2000. In total, the Mohawks have been Presidents' Cup medallists ten times.

Caughnawaga Indians (present member of Three Nations Senior Lacrosse League), were QSLL champions in 2007 and were medallists in 1969 (silver) as well as winning bronze in 1976 and 2013.

== Teams ==
Team	City	Arena	Joined
Kahnawake Mohawks	Kahnawake, Quebec	Kahnawake Sports Complex	2008
Windsor Aigles*	Windsor, Quebec	Centre J.A. Lemay	2018

* = team on hiatus

=== Former teams ===
- Capital Region Axemen (2013-2022)
- Caughnawaga Indians (2007-2010)
- Kahnawake Tomahawks (2014-2015)
- Lasalle Brasseurs (2003-2007)
- Longueuil Bulldogs/Patriotes/St-Hubert Patriotes (2002-2007)
- Montréal Éperviers (2002-2003)
- Montréal Phoenix (2011-2012)
- Sherbrooke Extrême (2007-2008, 2014)
- Shawinigan Éclairs (2002-2006)
- St-Eustache Diablo (2004-2005)
- West End Warlocks (2010)
- Windsor Aigles (2002-2006) - returned to QSLL in 2018
- Valleyfield Warriors/Dinomytes (2005-2010)
- Vermont Voyaguers (2010-2016)

== League champions ==
Year	Winner	Finalist	Presidents Cup finish
2002	Windsor Aigles	Shawinigan Éclairs	
2003	Windsor Aigles	Lasalle Brasseurs	
2004	Windsor Aigles	Lasalle Brasseurs	Silver medallist
2005	Valleyfield Warriors	Windsor Aigles	
2006	Longueuil Patriotes	Valleyfield Warriors	
2007	Lasalle Brasseurs	Longueuil Patriotes	
2008	Kahnawake Mohawks	Caughnawaga Indians	Bronze medallist
2009	Kahnawake Mohawks	Caughnawaga Indians	
2010	Kahnawake Mohawks	Valleyfield Dinomytes	Bronze medallist
2011	Kahnawake Mohawks	Vermont Voyageurs	
2012	Kahnawake Mohawks	Vermont Voyageurs	
2013	Kahnawake Mohawks	Capital Region Axemen	Silver medallist
2014	Kahnawake Mohawks	Capital Region Axemen	
2015	Capital Region Axemen	Kahnawake Mohawks	Silver medallist
2016	Kahnawake Mohawks	Capital Region Axemen	Silver medallist
2017	Kahnawake Mohawks	Capital Region Axemen	6th of 8
2018	Capital Region Axemen	Kahnawake Mohawks	8th of 8
2019	Capital Region Axemen	Kahnawake Mohawks	Axemen - 5th of 8 Mohawks (host) - Bronze medalist
2022	Capital Region Axemen	Kahnawake Mohawks	7th of 7
