= Ligue de Crosse Junior du Québec =

Lacrosse league

- LCJQ
- Sport: Box lacrosse
- Founded: 2015
- Commissioner: Denis Doyon
- No. of teams: 4
- Country: Canada
- Most recent champion: Windsor Eagles (2016)
- Most titles: two teams (1 each)

The Ligue de Crosse Junior du Québec (LCJQ) is a Junior C box lacrosse league sanctioned by the Fédération de crosse du Québec in Canada. Formed in 2015, the LCJQ has four member clubs.

== Teams ==
Team	Arena	Joined LCJQ
Longueuil Patriotes	Rosanne Laflamme	2015
Sherbrooke Extreme	Centre Julien Ducharme	2015
West Island Lacrosse Association	Centre Civique Dollard-des-Ormeaux	2016
Windsor Eagles	Centre J.A. Lemay	2015

=== Former teams ===
Montreal Shamrocks (2015) - played a partial schedule while also competing in FNJBLL

== Champions ==
Season	Champion	Runner-up	Result
2015	Sherbrooke Extreme	Longueuil Patriotes	3-2 (best-of 5)
2016	Windsor Eagles	Sherbrooke Extreme	3-1 (best-of 5)
