= Hamilton Bengals =

- Sport: Box lacrosse
- Founded: 2006
- League: OLA Junior B Lacrosse League
- Based in: Hamilton, Ontario
- Arena: Dave Andreychuk Arena
- Colours: Black, Yellow, and Grey
- Head coach: Jeff Dowling

The Hamilton Bengals are a Junior "B" box lacrosse team from Hamilton, Ontario, Canada. The Bengals play in the OLA Junior B Lacrosse League.

== History ==
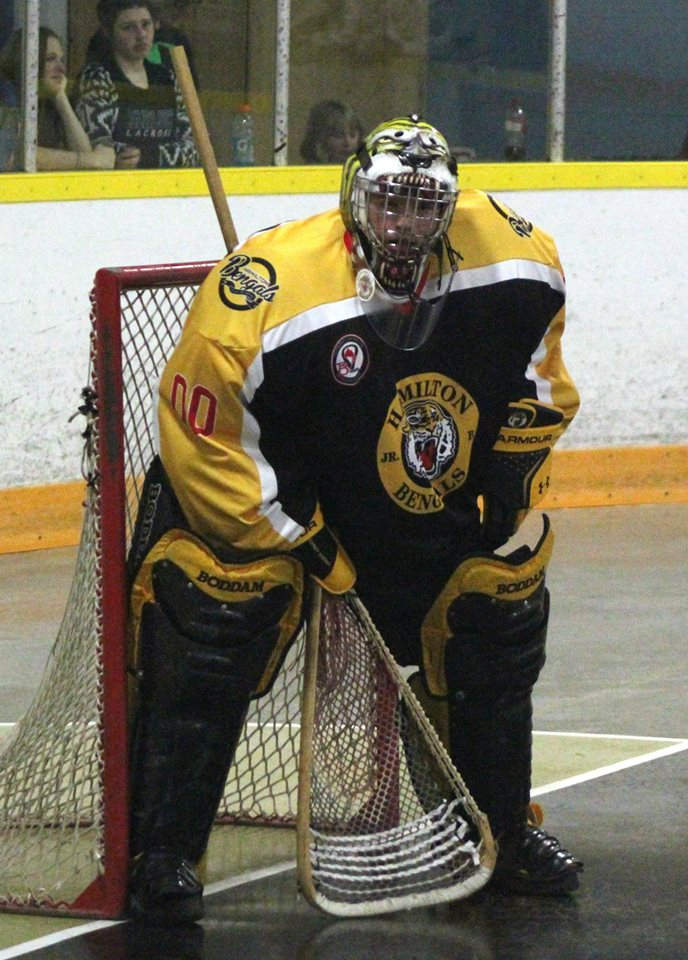
Bengals' goalie Keaton Dale during 2015 season.

Although not the same franchise, the Hamilton Bengals name does have some previous history. From 1976 until 1983, the original Hamilton Bengals existed in the OLA Junior A Lacrosse League. They moved in 1983 and are now currently known as the Burlington Chiefs.

The Bengals had an excellent first season in the OLA. With a winning record, they finished in seventh place in the regular season to clinch a playoff spot in their first season. Their first playoff opponent was the Niagara Thunderhawks who gave them the rookie treatment, vanquishing the Bengals in three straight games. The Bengals returned to the playoffs in 2007 but were eliminated in the first round once again.

After a 10 year wait, the Bengals returned to the playoffs in 2017 and won their first ever playoff game over the Elora Mohawks. They would go on and win their first ever playoff series as well before falling in the second round to the Six Nations Rebels. In 2018 the Bengals completed their best regular season ever, but fell in the first round of the playoffs to the Wallaceburg Red Devils, losing 3 games - 2. 2018 also marked team bests for goals against (149) and goals scored (211). The Bengals Coaching Staff were selected by their peers as Jr B West Coaching Staff of the year in both 2017 and 2018

== Season-by-season results ==
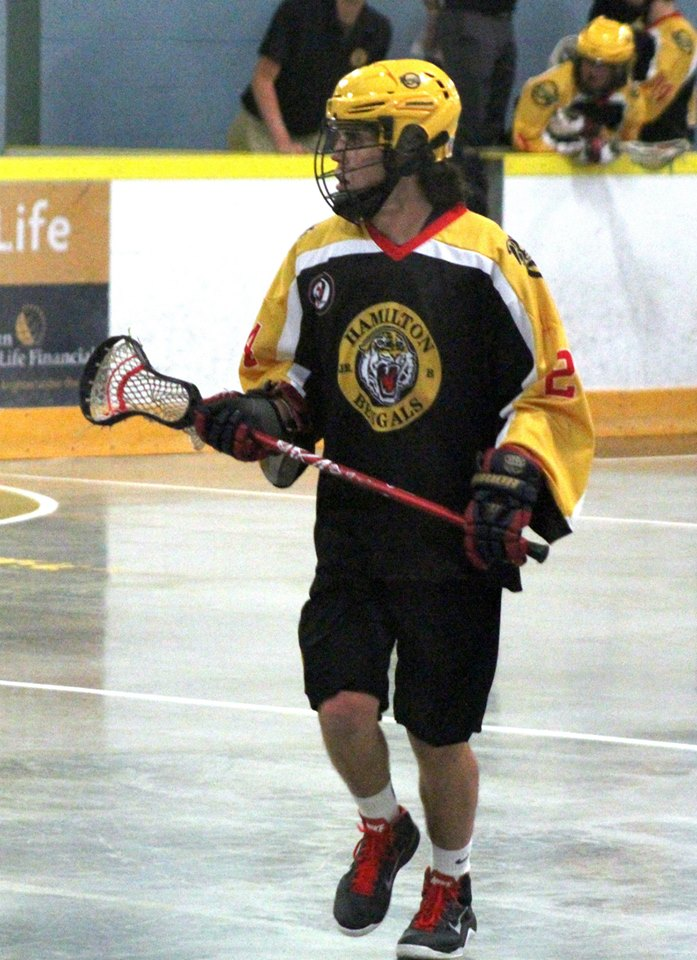
Bengals' player Josh Bryers during 2015 season.

Note: GP = Games played, W = Wins, L = Losses, T = Ties, Pts = Points, GF = Goals for, GA = Goals against

Season	GP	W	L	T	GF	GA	PTS	Placing	Playoffs
2006	20	11	9	0	182	142	22	7th OLA-B West	Lost 1st Round
2007	20	11	9	0	170	150	22	8th OLA-B West	Lost 1st Round
2008	20	8	12	0	138	172	16	9th OLA-B West	DNQ
2009	20	6	14	0	124	169	12	12th OLA-B West	DNQ
2010	20	2	18	0	122	195	4	14th OLA-B West	DNQ
2011	20	5	15	0	175	258	10	11th OLA-B West	DNQ
2012	20	4	16	0	184	249	8	14th OLA-B West	DNQ
2013	20	1	19	0	134	305	2	14th OLA-B West	DNQ
2014	20	1	17	2	88	237	4	13th OLA-B West	DNQ
2015	20	5	15	0	167	226	10	9th OLA-B West	DNQ
2016	20	7	13	0	161	205	14	11th OLA-B West	DNQ
2017	20	12	8	0	203	186	24	6th OLA-B West	lost in second round
2018	20	15	5	0	211	149	30	5th OLA-B West	lost in first round
