= Onondaga Redhawks =

- Founded: 2001
- League: Can-Am Senior B Lacrosse League
- Based in: Nedrow, New York
- Arena: Onondaga Nation Arena
- Colours: Red & Black
- President: Sherwin Hill
- Head coach: Ed Shenandoah
- General manager: Shirley Hill
- National championships: 2 (2010, 2014)
- League titles: 8 (2005, 2006, 2010, 2012, 2013, 2014, 2015, 2018)
- Website: http://www.redhawkslax.com

The Onondaga Redhawks are a Haudenosaunee Senior "B" box lacrosse team from Nedrow, New York at Onondaga Nation. The team play their home games at Tsha’ Hoñ'noñyeñ’dakhwa’, the Onondaga Nation Arena.

The Redhawks are eight-time Can-Am Senior B Lacrosse League (2005, 2006, 2010, 2012, 2013, 2014, 2015, 2018) champions and the 2010 and 2014 Presidents Cup Senior B National Champions.

== Junior Redhawks ==
The club also fields a Junior B side, the Jr. Redhawks, who compete in the First Nations Junior B Lacrosse League.

== Season-by-season results ==
Season	GP	W	L	T	GF	GA	P	Results	Playoffs
2001	24	19	5	0	325	184	38	2nd, Can-Am	Lost Finals
2002	16	12	4	0	206	115	24	2nd, Can-Am	Lost Finals
2003	12	10	2	0	167	114	20	1st, Can-Am	Lost Finals
2004	14	9	5	0	209	131	18	3rd, Can-Am	Lost Finals
2005	14	12	2	0	190	75	24	1st, Can-Am	Won League
2006	14	13	1	0	186	106	21	1st, Can-Am	Won League
2007	16	12	4	0	240	110	24	3rd, Can-Am	Lost Semifinals
2008	18	14	4	0	223	115	28	2nd, Can-Am	Lost Finals
2009	16	15	1	0	218	106	30	1st, Can-Am	Lost Finals
2010	14	13	1	0	214	92	26	1st, Can-Am	Won League
2011	14	6	8	0	180	155	12	4th, Can-Am	Lost Semifinals
2012	18	15	2	1	272	173	31	2nd, Can-Am	Won League
2013	16	13	3	0	238	108	26	2nd, Can-Am	Won League
2014	14	12	2	0	240	113	24	2nd, Can-Am	Won League
2015	16	13	3	0	247	139	26	1st, Can-Am	Won League
2016	13	12	1	0	209	97	24	1st, Can-Am	Lost Finals

== Presidents' Cup results ==
Season	Location	GP	W	L	GF	GA	Result
2005	Waterloo, Ontario	3	1	2	34	31	3rd, Dietrich Div.
2006	Ladner, British Columbia	5	2	3	43	45	5th Place
2010	Burnaby, British Columbia	7	6	1	85	58	Won Gold
2012	Spruce Grove, Alberta	6	2	4	61	89	6th Place
2013	Kahnawake, Quebec	6	1	5	52	76	7th Place
2014	Coquitlam, British Columbia	7	6	1	73	57	Won Gold
2015	St. Catharines, Ontario	3	1	2	30	32	4th Place
2018	Nanaimo, BC	9	3	6	75	93	6th Place

== Lacrosse All Stars North American Invitational results ==
Season	Location	GP	W	L	GF	GA	Result
2016	Onondaga Reservation	5	3	2	50	31	4th
