= Fédération de crosse du Québec =

Lacrosse governing body in Quebec, Canada

- Sport: Lacrosse
- Jurisdiction: Provincial
- Abbreviation: FCQ
- Founded: 1948
- Affiliation: Federation of International Lacrosse
- Headquarters: Montreal, Quebec
- President: Robert Daoust
- Chairman: Stephan Brière
- CEO: Stephan Brière

Official website
- www.crossequebec.com
- (Canada)
- (Quebec)

The Fédération de crosse du Québec (FCQ) is the governing body of lacrosse in Quebec, Canada. Its purpose is to encourage the development of lacrosse in Québec and to contribute to the sport's growth internationally. The FCQ governs all box, field, and women's field lacrosse in Québec.

The Fédération has approximately 2,000 members including players, coaches, referees and others.

The Fédération has two teams registered in the Ontario Lacrosse Association JrC league. The Fédération de crosse du Québec also has a SrB league that is considered semi-pro as some players are paid. It is not uncommon for National Lacrosse League professionals to be signed to a Quebec SrB team, or teams they encounter in league crossover games.

Field Lacrosse is generally played in high schools, colleges, and universities, either at spring or at fall. There are also a few club leagues for field lacrosse in the Fédération de crosse du Québec . Many lacrosse programs in the FCQ only start in high school. Approximately 20 high schools, 5 colleges, and 10 universities register field lacrosse teams with the Fédération.

== Competitions ==
=== Box lacrosse ===
- Ligue de Crosse Senior du Québec/Quebec Senior Lacrosse League (Senior B)
- Circuit québécois de crosse senior (Senior C)
- Ligue de Crosse Junior du Québec/Junior Lacrosse League Quebec (Junior C)
- Ligue de Crosse Junior du Québec/Greater Montreal Lacrosse League (Minor)
- First Nations Junior B Lacrosse League (Junior B) - members: Montreal Jr. Shamrocks and Vermont Jr. Voyageurs

=== Field Lacrosse ===
- Ligue senior de crosse au champ du Québec
- Canadian University Field Lacrosse League
- Ligue universitaire de crosse au champ du Québec
