= Kahnawake Sports Complex =

Coordinates: 45.3922°N 73.6956°W

The Kahnawake Sports Complexe is a 4,000-seat multipurpose arena in Kahnawake 14, Quebec, home to les Condors de Kahnawake, a Tier II Junior A hockey team of the Quebec Junior Hockey League.
