= Can-Am Senior B Lacrosse League =

Canadian-American lacrosse league

Can-Am Lacrosse League
- Sport: Box lacrosse
- Founded: 1978
- No. of teams: 6
- Country: United States
- Most recent champion: Newtown Golden Eagles (2026)
- Most titles: Newtown Golden Eagles (12)
- Website: CanAmLacrosse.org

The Can-Am Senior B Lacrosse League is a box lacrosse league comprised of six teams from the tribal reservations of the Haudenosaunee, located in current day New York State and Southern Ontario. The league is sanctioned by the First Nations Lacrosse Association.

== History ==
Originally formed in 1969 as the North American Lacrosse Association, the league was renamed to Can-Am in 1978.

The Newtown Golden Eagles have won 12 Can-Am titles, the most all time. The Golden Eagles have medaled at Presidents' Cup three times, including gold in 2000.

Can-Am teams have won the Presidents' Cup five times.

== Teams ==
Team	City	Reservation	First Year
Allegany Arrows	Jimerson Town, New York	Allegany	2006
Grand River Warriors	Six Nations, Ontario	Six Nations of the Grand River	2024
Newtown Golden Eagles	Irving, New York	Cattaraugus	1990
Oil Spring Senecas	Jimerson Town, New York	Oil Springs	2026
Onondaga Redhawks	Nedrow, New York	Onondaga	2001
Tonawanda Braves	Basom, New York	Tonawanda	2000

=== Former member teams ===
- Akwesasne Bucks (2019–2022)
- Buffalo Creek Thunder (2007–2022)
- Buffalo-Ft. Erie Braves
- Fort Erie Hawks (2001)
- Hagersville Tigers
- Hagersville Warriors
- Mohawk Storm (2003–05)
- Native Sons (2015–18)
- Niagara Hawks (2002–12)
- Ohsweken Wolves
- Oneida Silverhawks (2001)
- Oswego Hawks (2000–01)
- Pinewoods Smoke (2000–17)
- Rochester Greywolves (2008–13)
- Rochester River Monsters (2017–2022)
- Six Nations Braves (2003)
- Six Nations Mohawk Stars (2001)
- Six Nations Slash (2011–17)
- Six Nations Sting (2006–09)
- Steamburg/Coldspring Hellbenders (2007–08)
- Tuscarora Tomahawks (2012-2024)

== Champions ==
Season	Playoff Champion	Runner-up	Series	Presidents Cup result
1990	Newtown Golden Eagles			
1991	Newtown Golden Eagles			
1992	Newtown Golden Eagles			
1993	Tuscarora Hawks			
1994	Tuscarora Hawks			Gold
1995	Hagersville Tigers			
1996	Ohsweken Wolves			Gold
1997	Ohsweken Wolves			Silver
1998	Newtown Golden Eagles			Eagles: Silver; Hawks (host): Bronze
1999	Newtown Golden Eagles			Bronze
2000	Newtown Golden Eagles			Gold
2001	Newtown Golden Eagles			
2002	Newtown Golden Eagles			
2003	Newtown Golden Eagles			
2004	Newtown Golden Eagles			
2005	Onondaga Redhawks			
2006	Onondaga Redhawks			
2007	Six Nations Sting			
2008	Six Nations Sting			
2009	Niagara Hawks			
2010	Onondaga Redhawks	Niagara Hawks	2-0	Gold
2011	Newtown Golden Eagles	Six Nations Slash	4-1	
2012	Onondaga Redhawks	Newtown Golden Eagles	4-0	
2013	Onondaga Redhawks	Newtown Golden Eagles	4-1	Elimintated in round robin
2014	Onondaga Redhawks	Newton Golden Eagles	4-0	Gold
2015	Onondaga Redhawks	Native Sons	4-1	4th
2016	Native Sons	Onondaga Redhawks	4-0	4th
2017	Native Sons	Pinewoods Smoke	4-2	Bronze
2018	Onondaga Redhawks	Tuscarora Tomahawks	4-2	6th
2019	Akwesasne Bucks	Tuscarora Tomahawks	4-0	Silver
2022	Akwesasne Bucks	Newtown Golden Eagles	3-1	Silver
2023	Tuscarora Tomahawks	Allegany Arrows	3-2	7th
2024	Allegany Arrows	Tonawanda Braves	3-0	Bronze
2025	Allegany Arrows	Tonawanda Braves	4-1	5th
2026	Newtown Golden Eagles	Tonawanda Braves	4-2	4th

== Championship results by team ==
Team	Wins	Years won
Newtown Golden Eagles	12	1990, 1991, 1992, 1998, 1999, **2000**, 2001, 2002, 2003, 2004, 2011, 2026
Onondaga Redhawks	8	2005, 2006, **2010**, 2012, 2013, **2014**, 2015, 2018
Tuscarora/Niagara Hawks or Tuscarora Tomahawks	4	1993, **1994**, 2009, 2023
Allegany Arrows	2	2024, 2025
Akwesasne Bucks	2	2019, 2022
Native Sons	2	2016, 2017
Six Nations Sting	2	2007, 2008
Ohsweken Wolves	2	**1996**, 1997
Hagersville Tigers	1	1995

Bold indicates a Presidents Cup win in that season.
