= British Columbia Junior Tier 1 Lacrosse League =

Junior B box lacrosse league

- Sport: Box lacrosse
- First season: 1986
- Commissioner: Frazer MacDonald
- No. of teams: 10
- Country: Canada
- Most recent champion: Coquitlam Adanacs (2025)
- Website: BCJT1LL

The British Columbia Junior Tier 1 Lacrosse League, or BCJT1LL is a Junior B box lacrosse league based in the Lower Mainland of British Columbia, Canada, sanctioned by the British Columbia Lacrosse Association. The league champion competes for the British Columbia Junior B Provincial Championship. Teams have competed for the Founders Cup, a national tournament which determines the Canadian Junior B lacrosse champion.

== History ==
The league was known as the BC Intermediate A League until the end of 2017. At the beginning of the 2018 season, 17 & 18 year old lacrosse was merged with Junior B, expanding the bracket to the age brackets used by the rest of the Canadian Lacrosse Association.

Since 2018, the BCJT1LL champions have played a provincial championship series against the TOJLL winners. The T1 champion has won every series.

== Teams ==
Team	Established
Burnaby Lakers	1990
Coquitlam Adanacs	1990
Delta Islanders	1986
Langley Thunder	2004
Nanaimo Timbermen	2018
New Westminster Salmonbellies	1990
Port Coquitlam Saints	1986
Richmond Roadrunners	2018
Ridge Meadows Burrards	1994
Victoria Shamrocks	2018

=== Former teams ===
- Abbotsford Timberwolves (2003–04)
- Burnaby Cablevision (1986)
- Delta Spuddiggers (1994; never played a game)
- Edmonton Goldbar (1986)
- Esquimalt Legion
- Juan de Fuca Whalers (1988)
- Langley Knights
- Nanaimo Timbermen
- North Shore Eagles
- North Shore Indians
- Port Moody Thunder (1988-2017)
- Richmond Roadrunners (2009–16)
- Saanich Tigers (1990)
- Squamish Nation (1993)
- Surrey Rebels (1989-2014)
- Vancouver-Killarney (1986–89)

== Champions ==
Year	Regular season	Playoffs	BC Tier 1 Provincials	Founders Cup result
1986	Edmonton Goldbar		South Vancouver Killarney	
1987	South Vancouver-Killarney	South Vancouver Killarney	South Vancouver Killarney	
1988	Langley Knights			
1989	Esquimalt Legion			
1990	New Westminster Salmonbellies	Port Coquitlam Saints		Port Coquitlam Saints - Silver
1991	Delta Islanders	Port Coquitlam Saints		
1992				
1993	Langley Knights			
1994	Langley Knights			
1995	Richmond Roadrunners	Richmond Roadrunners		
1996	Vancouver Burrards			
1997				
1998				
1999	Delta Islanders			
2000	New Westminster Salmonbellies			
2001	Delta Islanders			
2002	Coquitlam Adanacs			
2003	Delta Islanders	Coquitlam Adanacs		Coquitlam Adanacs - Silver
2004	Coquitlam Adanacs	Coquitlam Adanacs		
2005	Coquitlam Adanacs			
2006	Coquitlam Adanacs			
2007	Coquitlam Adanacs	Coquitlam Adanacs		Coquitlam Adanacs - Silver
2008	Port Coquitlam Saints			
2009	Coquitlam Adanacs	Port Moody Thunder		
2010	New Westminster Salmonbellies	New Westminster Salmonbellies		
2011	Port Moody Thunder	Port Moody Thunder		
2012	Delta Islanders	Delta Islanders		
2013	Coquitlam Adanacs	Delta Islanders		
2014	Delta Islanders	Delta Islanders		
2015	Coquitlam Adanacs	New Westminster Salmonbellies		Coquitlam Adanacs - 4th Place
2016	New Westminster Salmonbellies	Coquitlam Adanacs		Coquitlam Adanacs - Gold
2017	Coquitlam Adanacs	Coquitlam Adanacs	BCJT1LL vs TOJLL	Coquitlam Adanacs - Gold
2018	Victoria Shamrocks	Victoria Shamrocks	Victoria Shamrocks - Vernon Tigers declined Provincials berth	Coquitlam Adanacs - Bronze
2019	Coquitlam Adanacs	Delta Islanders	Victoria Shamrocks def. South Okanagan Flames 27-10 (2-game aggregate)	Coquitlam Adanacs - TBD
2021	Coquitlam Adanacs	Coquitlam Adanacs		
2022	Victoria Shamrocks	Coquitlam Adanacs	Coquitlam Adanacs def. Kamloops Venom 28-11 (2-game aggregate)	
2023	Coquitlam Adanacs	Victoria Shamrocks	Victoria Shamrocks def. Kamloops Venom 31-14 (2-game aggregate)	
2024	Coquitlam Adanacs	Victoria Shamrocks	Victoria Shamrocks def. Kamloops Venom 2 games to 0 (36-19 aggregate)	
2025	Victoria Shamrocks	Coquitlam Adanacs	Coquitlam Adanacs def. Kelowna Kodiaks 2 games to 0 (33-14 aggregate)	

== See also ==
- Thompson Okanagan Junior Lacrosse League
- Pacific Northwest Junior Lacrosse League
- West Coast Junior Lacrosse League
