= Harry George Woolley =

Canadian player, coach, referee, manager, scout and advocate for the game of lacrosse

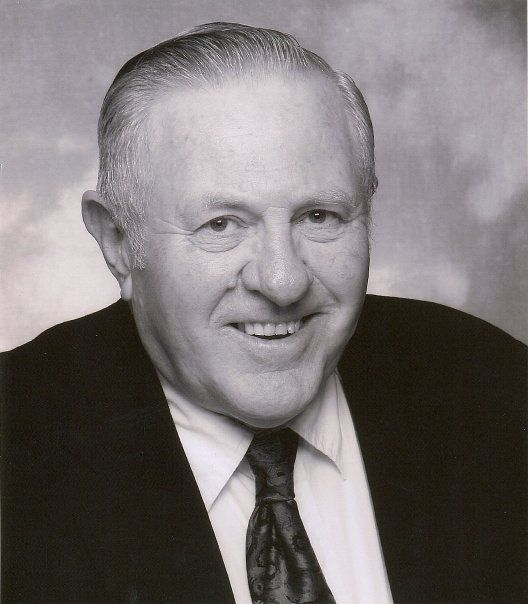

Personal information
- Nickname: Woolley Jumper
- Born: January 4, 1942
- Died: May 23, 2009 (aged 67)

Sport
- Country: Canada
- Sport: Lacrosse

Harry George Woolley (4 January 1942 – 23 May 2009) was a Canadian player, coach, referee, manager, scout and advocate for the game of lacrosse. He spent 46 years as a builder volunteering in a total of 72 appointments. His career extended to coaching, refereeing and managing lacrosse teams in Francophone & First Nations communities.

== Occupation ==
Woolley was a Correctional Officer by day and sports enthusiast by night. Woolley worked at Oakalla Prison Farm in Burnaby, BC from 1976 until its closing in 1992. Harry was then transferred to work at the new Fraser Regional Correctional Centre in Maple Ridge, British Columbia where he worked until his official retirement in 2002.

== Amateur lacrosse ==
Woolley's introduction to box lacrosse came by chance when he was invited to play by a group of boys. After he picked up a lacrosse stick and played the game, he fell in love with the sport immediately.

He played high school lacrosse at Burnaby North Secondary school. Woolley also played amateur lacrosse for Renfrew Minor, Burnaby Minor, Burnaby Junior and the Chilliwack Junior A league.

== Sorel Titans ==
Woolley played semi-professional lacrosse with the Sorel Titans in Quebec from 1965 to 1968. Woolley at 23 years of age played under the mentorship of Hockey Hall of Fame legend and Montreal Canadiens hockey player John Ferguson, Sr. Woolley wanted to emulate Ferguson's style as an enforcer and gain notoriety for his cavalier treatment of the opposition. John Ferguson, Sr. was coach for the Sorel Titans, one of six Quebec Lacrosse League (QLL) clubs that played in the 1960s.

Woolley and other QLL players drew crowds of over 3,000 people. Harry became a solid centre forward and was eventually made captain of his team. He was in the top 12 consistently for overall points in the league.

One fanatical fan took his vendetta against Woolley to the extreme. After playing a hard-fought game for the Titans, Woolley was followed by an opposing fan who pulled a knife on him. Quebec coach Rene Cournoyer intervened by tackling the man to the ground and was later credited with saving Woolley's life.

In 1968, Woolley coached the Sorel Titans Jr. club to the Quebec Junior crown. He also found time to referee minor lacrosse in Sorel-Tracy.

== Coquitlam Adanacs ==
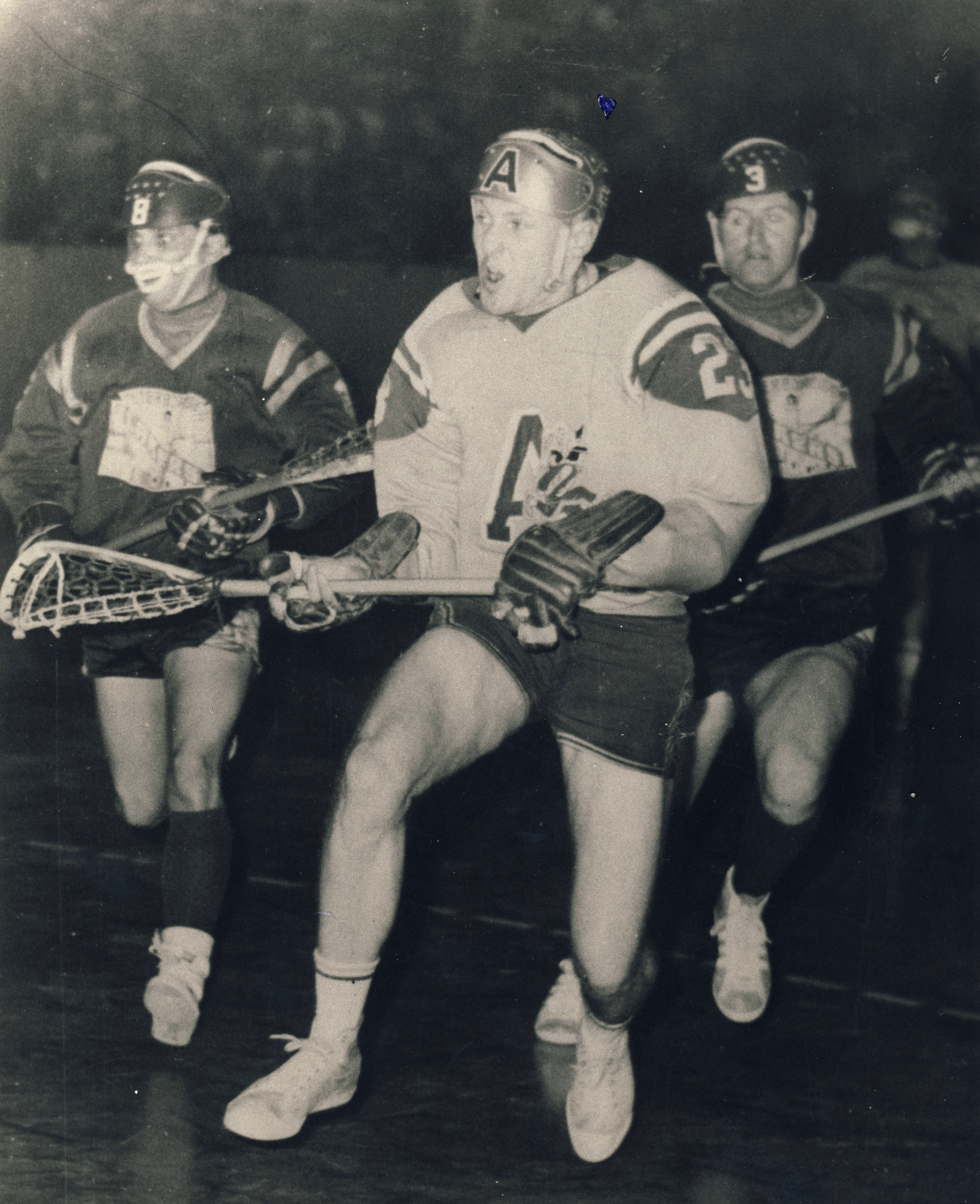
Harry the "Woolley Jumper" playing lacrosse for the Coquitlam Adanacs

Woolley signed with the Senior A Coquitlam Adanacs for the 1969 and 1970 seasons.

Taking after his mentor John Ferguson, Sr., Woolley became known for his on floor antics as a scrapper and drew audiences to watch his anticipated fights. His nickname was "The Woolley Jumper".

Local media in the Vancouver area helped build momentum and interest for Coquitlam Adanacs games by publicizing many of his scraps. Interest in BC lacrosse was high during this period with sell-outs being the norm.

His on-floor rivalry with local lacrosse hero Al Lewthwaite of the New Westminster Salmonbellies is well documented. Woolley had a pre-game note published in the local paper that warned Lewthwaite: "Al be nimble, Al be quick. Don’t get caught by the Jumper’s stick". A legendary brawl ensued between the two of them during the fourth game of the Adanacs vs. Salmonbellies 1969 playoffs.

His red hair and matching temper helped fuel many game misconducts. Woolley went so far making an offer to take on the entire Victoria Shamrocks team including the goalkeeper.

At the end of 1970, Woolley retired from semi-professional lacrosse and focused his efforts on building the game.

Woolley continues to hold the Coquitlam Adanacs' single season team record for most penalty minutes with 174.

== Media ==
Woolley's passion for lacrosse extended to providing a voice to the local media. Before the time of hiring media relations personnel, Harry had the ability to market lacrosse through self-promotion. Sports columnist Glyn Lewis of The Columbian newspaper in New Westminster, BC published an article saying: "Pushing deadline the other day, The Woolley Jumper attracted some mild attention by standing in the line of my typewriter’s return carriage. He wasn’t about to move until he’d been heard".

In 1989, Woolley was a colour commentator for the Burnaby Cablevision Junior A lacrosse team. Woolley worked alongside play-by-play announcer Ernie Blanchard to provide knowledgeable lacrosse analysis. Home games were broadcast on the local Burnaby Cable Television network.

Despite challenges the game had faced, Woolley never gave up believing that lacrosse would one day establish a larger following. He was a vocal advocate to keep lacrosse as Canada's national sport after the House of Commons of Canada debated the issue in 1994.

Woolley is considered to be one of the most controversial people in the history of British Columbia lacrosse. He was notorious for his outspoken manner and contentious remarks to the press.

== Coaching ==
Woolley was a coach for 17 years. Woolley coached three teams that went on to become BC Provincial champions under the Burnaby Norburn colors: 1962 Pee-Wee, 1963 Under-10 & 1963 Pee-Wee.

Woolley coached the 1975 Senior B Port Coquitlam Chiefs to BC Provincial silver. The club won the West Coast Senior Lacrosse Association Senior B league and playoffs. He was the coach for the Bantam North Delta Hawks in 1988 who won silver at the BC Provincials and gold at the BC Summer Games.

Woolley chaired the British Columbia Lacrosse Association (BCLA) Coaches Association in 1988 and 1990. He helped produce manuals and teaching aids for the development of coaches. In 1988, Woolley created the well-known British Columbia publication, Coaches Corner.

== First Nations ==
Woolley volunteered for First Nations lacrosse teams and worked with many First Nations people. Woolley was voted the West Coast Senior Lacrosse Association Manager of the Year in 2000 after working for the North Shore Indians Senior B club. He also earned the Hugh Gifford merit award for his efforts after the team became WCSLA champs. While holding the general manager and governor position, Woolley helped raise $1,500 for the Simon Baker Bursary Fund.

Woolley helped launch a tribute section for North Shore Indian lacrosse player Justin Baker in the first edition of the WCSLA website. In 2005, Woolley worked as a consultant for the Six Nations Arrows Junior A lacrosse club. The team became national Minto Cup silver medalists.

In his commitment to retaining box lacrosse heritage, in 2005, Harry and his daughter Erica Woolley donated a Lally Extra Special Box Lacrosse Stick to the Ontario Lacrosse Hall of Fame. All of the sticks manufactured at Lally's in Cornwall, Ontario were handmade by First Nations people. The stick was acquired in an eBay auction after a documentary dedicated to aboriginal Canadian Lacrosse Hall of Fame inductee Ross Powless finished filming.

== Scouting ==
Late in his career, Woolley became a scout officially and unofficially for several lacrosse teams. He had natural ability to spot and recruit talent for teams he was volunteering for.

Woolley worked as Director of Player Personnel/Scout for the New Westminster Salmonbellies Senior A club in 1999, 2004, 2005 and 2006. Before his death in April 2009, Woolley helped the Burnaby Lakers Jr. A team with their draft selections but did not hold an official title.

Woolley was hired as a consultant by a number of National Lacrosse League (NLL) teams to recruit lacrosse players from the Western Lacrosse Association (WLA).

== Refereeing ==
He refereed the game of lacrosse between 1960 and 1997, including the Mann Cup, Minto Cup and Presidents Cup (box lacrosse). He wore a refereeing badge for 17 years. Woolley refereed games in Minor, Junior A, Senior A and Senior B leagues.

In 1978, Woolley was punched in the face by a player refereeing a Senior B game. He donned a black jersey for the 1980 Nation's World Cup Championships held in North Vancouver, BC. A second assault on Harry occurred during the officiating for this event. Woolley was deliberately slashed across the face by a player at the end of the game. Woolley required several stitches to close a cut over his eye.

His final blow of the whistle came in 1997 when he refereed the gold medal Masters game in Vernon, British Columbia.

== Managing ==
Woolley co-managed the 1971 Senior B Burnaby Kokanee club with Dick Wills that went on to become West Coast Senior Lacrosse Association (WCSLA) champions, Provincial champions and Presidents Cup (box lacrosse) finalists. Woolley laced up his boots for the Burnaby Kokanee's when they were short players.

In 2001, Woolley was the assistant general manager for the New Westminster Salmonbellies, Senior A club.

== West Coast Senior Lacrosse Association ==
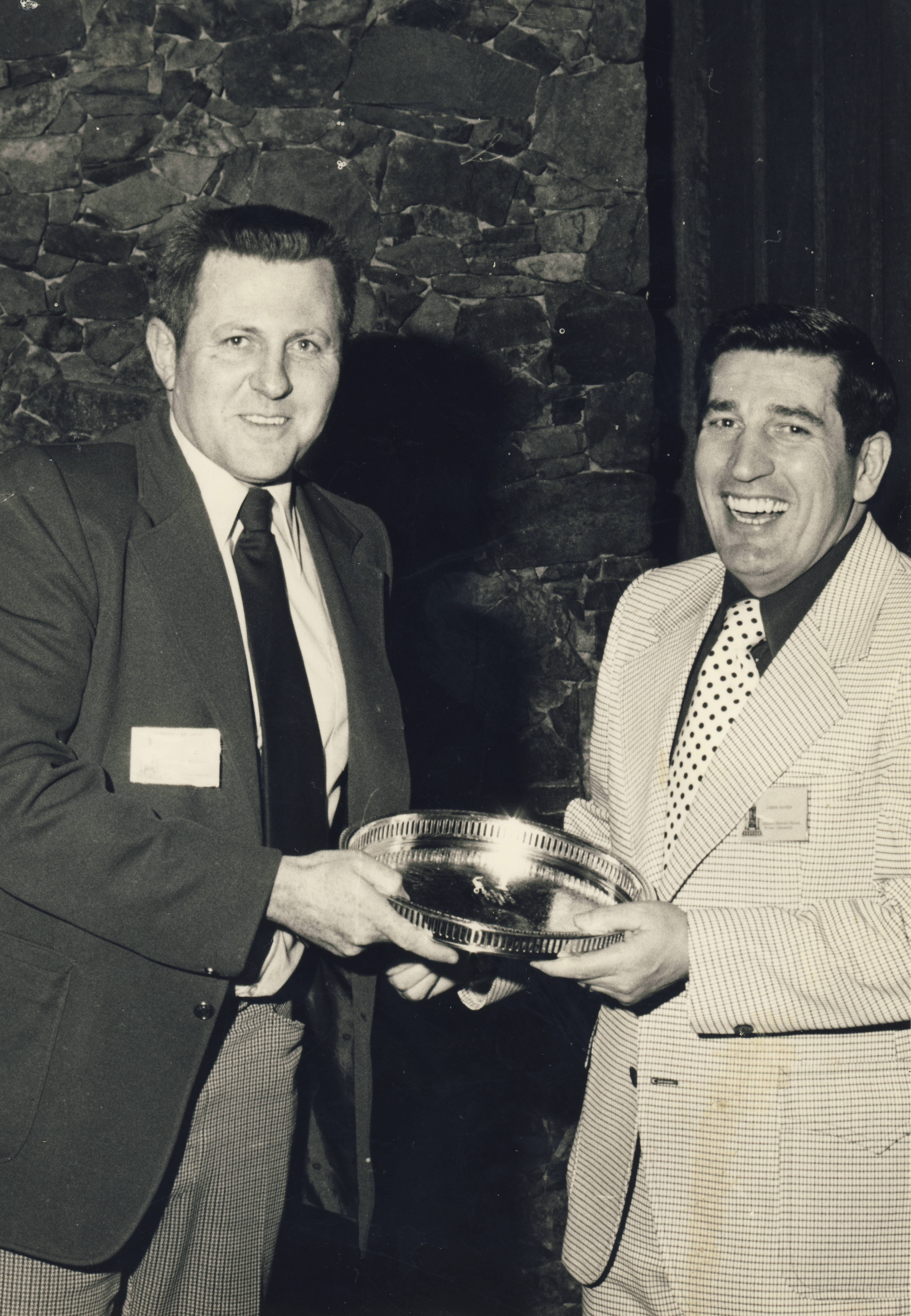
Harry Woolley receiving the Mr. Sport Award from SFU Sports Director Lorne Davies

In 1972, Woolley took over as commissioner of the floundering Inter-City Senior B Lacrosse League. He took drastic measures in changing the structure of the organization by implementing a league agreement, producing league perpetual trophies and crafting a new overall image. Out of the changes came the newly formed West Coast Senior Lacrosse Association (WCSLA) in 1973. Woolley helped the Senior B league take giant strides toward respectability after years of having a reputation for being just a beer league.

While he was league commissioner, he ruled against the home Nanaimo Senior B team. Consequently, he was chased out of the arena by an angry mob of fans who hurled beer bottles at him.

Attendance grew from only a half-dozen people to several hundred fans during the playoffs. Woolley believed in the potential to have a respectable and competitive secondary division. He envisioned a league composed of players that did not want to play in the Western Lacrosse Association (Senior A) or that just lacked experience.

In 1974, Woolley helped bring the Presidents Cup finals to the Lower Mainland for the first time. To make this happen Harry single-handedly spent months pounding on doors of local businesses to raise $5,000 and acquired a number of sponsorships.

His hard work reforming the league translated into becoming the first nominee and recipient of the Mr. Sport Award given out by The Columbian newspaper in New Westminster, BC for work toward amateur sport.

Woolley donated several awards to the WCSLA, including the Most Sportsmanlike Player Trophy, Most Sportsmanlike Team Trophy, Jeff Woolley Memorial Trophy, the Commissioner's Plaque and the Mickey Meslo Perpetual Trophy.

== North Delta Minor Lacrosse ==
In 1976, Woolley and John Dorflinger of North Delta, BC founded the North Delta Minor Lacrosse Association (NDML). What initiated the move were the 40 registered lacrosse players residing in North Delta, British Columbia that were playing for Surrey minor teams.

Woolley set up a successful recruitment drive to promote lacrosse to children residing in his own community. He also drafted up an association constitution and bylaws that complied with the BC Societies Act. During the same year, he became 2nd vice president of the North Delta Minor Lacrosse Association.

== West Central Lacrosse League ==
Woolley founded the West Central Lacrosse League (WCLL) in the fall of 2002. Earlier in 2002, while being commissioner of the West Coast Senior Lacrosse Association (WCSLA) Senior B league, Woolley saw 55 players cut with nowhere to play. He completed the necessary paperwork and helped organize the new league get off the ground.

In May 2003, the WCLL was launched. The league's playing talent ranges from ex-Senior B players and Junior B call-ups to the completely inexperienced. The vision Woolley had in establishing the WCLL was to create a recreational league that any lacrosse enthusiast could join.

== Boxing ==
Woolley was an avid boxer who enjoyed getting into the ring. At only 15 years old he quickly excelled to win the Burnaby Bronze Gloves competition in 1957. The following year Harry advanced to become an Emerald Glove Finalist in Vancouver, BC.

In 1966, when Woolley was 24 years old, he fought all the way to earn a spot at the Canadian Golden Gloves finals in Montreal, Quebec in the 165 lb. division. Woolley lost the final bout to a boxer that would later turn professional. As a result of making it to the finals, Woolley received the O’Keefe Trophy.

== Awards ==
Woolley is the two-time winner of the Mr. Lacrosse Tom Gordon plaque for giving the most to British Columbia lacrosse in 1970 and 1974.

In 2004, Woolley was inducted into the Canadian Lacrosse Hall of Fame.

In 2006, Woolley received the Dewalt Award from the Ontario Lacrosse Hall of Fame for years of service.

Woolley served as president of the British Columbia Lacrosse Association from 1995 to 1996.
