= Pacific Northwest Junior Lacrosse League =

PNWJLL
- Sport: Box lacrosse
- First season: 2001
- Commissioner: Chris Shortt
- No. of teams: 6
- Country: Canada
- Most recent champion: Nanaimo Timberman (2024)
- Most titles: Peninsula Falcons
- Website: PNWJLL

The Pacific Northwest Junior Lacrosse League, or PNWJLL is a Junior B Tier 2 box lacrosse league based in British Columbia, Canada, sanctioned by the British Columbia Lacrosse Association. The league champion and runner up both compete for the British Columbia Junior B2 Provincial Championship.

== History ==
Formed in 2001, the PNWJLL began as a five-team league. The inaugural season included Campbell River Ravens, Juan de Fuca Whalers, Nanaimo Jr. B Timbermen, Peninsula Falcons and Victoria-Esquimalt Eagles. The Timbermen were crowned the first league champion after an 11-3-1 season.

Expansion included one team for Season 2 as the league played with six teams for the 2002 and 2003 seasons. Membership peaked in 2004 when eight teams competed. That number did not last as three teams (Juan de Fuc Whalers, Peninsula Falcons and Saanich Tigers) folded after the season.

The Westshore Bears were the first PNWJLL team to win a gold medal at the British Columbia Provincials in 2005.

In August 2013 the Saanich Tigers captured the league's second Gold Medal at the British Columbia Provincials, defeating host Burnaby Lakers 12-10. Saanich defeated the Vernon Tigers 21-15 in the opening game before falling to Burnaby 10-9 on Day 2. A 7-6 win over the Delta Islanders earned their place in the championship.

Saanich repeated their Gold medal performance in 2015 winning all four games in the Provincials tournament held at The Q Centre in Victoria.

The Cowichan Thunder were the third team to win a gold medal at the provincial tournament, doing so in 2018.

The league's fifth gold medal was won by the Saanich Express in 2025.

== Teams ==
Team	Centre	Arena	Established
Campbell River Ravens	Campbell River	Strathcona Gardens Recreation Complex	2017
Nanaimo Jr. B2 Timbermen	Nanaimo	Nanaimo Ice Centre	2008
Oceanside Sharks	Parksville	Oceanside Place	2019
Saanich Express	Saanich	Save-On-Foods Memorial Centre	2018
Westshore Bears	West Shore	The Q Centre	2004

=== Former teams ===
- Campbell River Ravens (2001-2012)
- Cowichan Valley Thunder (2002-2012; 2015–16; 2018)
- Juan de Fuca Whalers (2002-2004)
- Mid-Island Braves (2005)
- Nanaimo Jr. B Timbermen (2001-2004)
- Peninsula Falcons (2001-2006)
- Peninsula Warriors (2011-2013)
- Saanich Tigers (2004)
- Saanich Tigers (2011-2017)
- Saanich-Peninsula (2009-2010)
- Victoria-Esquimalt Eagles (2001-2012)

== League champions ==
Season	Regular season	Playoffs Champion	Runner-up	Result
2001	Nanaimo Jr. B Timbermen	Juan de Fuca Whalers	---	11-3-1
2002	Peninsula Falcons	Peninsula Falcons	Juan de Fuca Whalers	12-2-1
2003	Juan de Fuca Whalers	Peninsula Falcons	Juan de Fuca Whalers	14-0-1
2004	Peninsula Falcons	Peninsula Falcons	---	14-0-0
2005	Westshore Bears	Westshore Bears	---	13-1-0
2006	Peninsula Falcons	Peninsula Falcons	---	
2007	Victoria-Esquimalt Eagles	Victoria-Esquimalt Eagles	Westshore Bears	2-0 (best-of 3)
2008	Westshore Bears	Westshore Bears	Campbell River Ravens	2-1 (best-of 3)
2009	Victoria-Esquimalt Eagles	Victoria-Esquimalt Eagles	Westshore Bears	2-1 (best-of 3)
2010	Westshore Bears	Westshore Bears	Cowichan Valley Thunder	3-1 (best-of 5)
2011	Cowichan Valley Thunder	Cowichan Valley Thunder	Peninsula Warriors	2-0 (best-of 3)
2012	Westshore Bears	no playoffs	---	17-3-0
2013	Saanich Tigers	Saanich Tigers	Westshore Bears	3-1 (best-of 5)
2014	Saanich Tigers	Saanich Tigers	Westshore Bears	2-0 (best-of 5)
2015	Saanich Tigers	Saanich Tigers	Westshore Bears	2-0 (best-of 3)
2016	Saanich Tigers	Saanich Tigers	Westshore Bears	2-0 (best-of 3)
2017	Westshore Bears	Westshore Bears	Saanich Tigers	3-1 (best-of 5)
2018	Cowichan Thunder	Cowichan Thunder	Westshore Bears	2-0 (best-of 3)
2019	Westshore Bears	Westshore Bears	Saanich Express	2-0 (best-of 3)
2021	Westshore Bears	Exhibition season - no playoffs		6-0
2022	Saanich Express	Saanich Express	Westshore Bears	2-1 (best-of 3)
2023	Saanich Express	Saanich Express	Westshore Bears	2-0 (best-of 3)
2024	Saanich Express	Nanaimo Timbermen	Saanich Express	2-0 (best-of 3)
2025	Saanich Express	Westshore Bears	Saanich Express	2-0 (best-of 3)

== BC Provincials ==
PNWJLL teams have had success competing in the British Columbia Junior B Provincials, winning 5 gold medals since 2005.

Medal history

Year	Team	Result
2005	Westshore Bears	Gold
2009	Victoria-Esquimalt Eagles	Bronze
2010	Westshore Bears	Silver
2012	Saanich Tigers	Bronze
2013	Saanich Tigers	Gold
2015	Saanich Tigers Westshore Bears	Gold Bronze
2016	Saanich Tigers	Bronze
2017	Westshore Bears	Bronze
2018	Cowichan Thunder Westshore Bears	Gold Bronze
2019	Sannich Express	Silver
2023	Westshore Bears Saanich Express	Bronze 4th
2024	Nanaimo Timbermen Saanich Express	Silver 4th
2025	Saanich Express Westshore Bears	Gold 4th

== See also ==
- Thompson Okanagan Junior Lacrosse League
- West Coast Junior Lacrosse League
