= West Coast Junior Lacrosse League =

Junior B box lacrosse league

- Sport: Box lacrosse
- First season: 2018
- Commissioner: Terry Kirstiuk
- No. of teams: 11
- Country: Canada
- Most recent champion: Coquitlam Adanacs Gold (2025)
- Most titles: Coquitlam Adanacs, Coquitlam Adanacs Gold (3)
- Website: WCJLL

The West Coast Junior Lacrosse League, or WCJLL is a Junior B Tier 2 box lacrosse league based in the Lower Mainland of British Columbia, Canada, sanctioned by the British Columbia Lacrosse Association. The league is one of two Tier 2 Junior B level leagues in British Columbia.

== History ==
Beginning with the 2018 season, 17 and 18 year old lacrosse was merged with Junior B, expanding the bracket to the age brackets used by the rest of the Canadian Lacrosse Association. WCJLL is one of two Tier 2 leagues (Pacific Northwest Junior Lacrosse League) in the province. Two teams from each league go head-to-head in the postseason at the British Columbia Tier 2 Provincials.

Westshore Bears hosted the Provincials in 2018 defeating Coquitlam Adanacs in the Bronze medal game 9-6. Port Moody Thunder would take the Silver medal with a 12-9 overtime loss to the Cowichan Valley Thunder.

10 teams competed in the WCJLL in 2025, including two separate Adanacs teams. Coquitlam has been the dominant force in the league since its creation, winning all titles except for the inaugural one.

The lineup for the league changed slightly in 2026, with the Adanacs being reduced to only one team, while Ridge Meadows and West Kootenay both fielded teams.

== Teams ==
WCJLL Tier 2 teams - 2026
Team
Coquitlam Adanacs Gold
Delta Islanders
Langley Thunder
New Westminster Salmonbellies
North Shore Indians
Port Coquitlam Saints
Port Moody Thunder
South Fraser Riptide
Valley Sturgeon
Ridge Meadows Burrards
West Kootenay Timberwolves

== Champions ==
WCJLL Tier 2 champions
| Season | Tier 2 Champion | Runner up | Result |
|---|---|---|---|
| 2018 | Port Moody Thunder | Coquitlam Adanacs | |
| 2019 | Coquitlam Adanacs | North Shore Indians | 2-0 (best of 3) |
| 2021 | Coquitlam Adanacs | Exhibition season - no playoffs | |
| 2022 | Coquitlam Adanacs | Valley Rebels | 2-0 (best of 3) |
| 2023 | Coquitlam Adanacs Gold | Valley Sturgeon | 2-0 (best of 3) |
| 2024 | Coquitlam Adanacs Gold | Valley Sturgeon | 2-0 (best of 3) |
| 2025 | Coquitlam Adanacs Gold | Langley Thunder | 2-1 (best of 3) |

== British Columbia Tier 2 Provincials ==
WCJLL teams at Provincials
| Year | WCJLL team | Round robin | Result | Host |
|---|---|---|---|---|
| 2018 | Port Moody Thunder Coquitlam Adanacs | 3-0-0 0-2-1 | Silver 4th | Westshore Bears The Q Centre |
| 2019 | Coquitlam Adanacs Port Moody Thunder | 2-0-1 1-1-1 | Gold Bronze | Port Moody Thunder Port Moody Recreation Complex |
| 2023 | Coquitlam Adanacs Valley Sturgeon | 3-0-0 2-1-0 | Gold Silver | |
| 2024 | Coquitlam Adanacs Valley Sturgeon | 3-0-0 0-3-0 | Gold Bronze | |
| 2025 | Coquitlam Adanacs Gold Langley Thunder | 2-1-0 2-1-0 | Bronze Silver | |

== See also ==
- British Columbia Junior Tier 1 Lacrosse League
- Pacific Northwest Junior Lacrosse League (Tier 2)
- Thompson Okanagan Junior Lacrosse League (Tier 1)
