= Thompson Okanagan Senior Lacrosse League =

- Sport: Box lacrosse
- Founded: 1994
- No. of teams: 5
- Country: Canada
- Most recent champion: Kelowna Raiders (2025) (2025)
- Website: TOSLL stats

The Thompson Okanagan Senior Lacrosse League (TOSLL) is a men's Senior C amateur box lacrosse league sanctioned by the British Columbia Lacrosse Association in Canada. Originally formed in 1994 as the Interior Senior Lacrosse League, the name changed after 1999 to Thompson Xtreme Lacrosse League. Before the 2012 season the league again renamed to the current TOSLL.

The original championship trophy was called the Shaw Cup, and was awarded from 1994 until it was replaced by the Rowcliffe Cup in 2014.

The 2018 season was a low for the league, with only Armstrong and Kamloops fielding teams and Kelowna on a one year hiatus. The two played a five game series, with Armstrong dominating and winning every game.

The league briefly expanded to 5 teams in 2022 with the inclusion of the Princeton Rangers, but the Rangers lost every game they played and folded towards the end of the season.

The league again expanded to 5 teams in 2026 with the inclusion of the West Kootenay Timberwolves .

== Teams ==
Team	City/area	Arena	Joined
Armstrong Shamrocks	Armstrong, BC	Norval Arena	1994
Kamloops Rattlers	Kamloops, BC	Kamloops Memorial Arena	2008
Kelowna Raiders	Kelowna, BC	Rutland Arena	2001
Vernon Tigers	Vernon, BC	Kal Tire Place	2019

=== Former teams ===
- Kelowna Kodiaks/Warriors (1994-2002)
- Kamloops Rebels (1995-1996)
- Kelowna Raiders (2001-2017) - went on one-year hiatus in 2018
- Vernon Tigers/Royals (1994-2012)
- Princeton Rangers (2022)

== Champions ==
Year	Winner	Finalist	Result
2001	Kelowna Warriors	Armstrong Shamrocks	3-1 (best-of 5)
2002	Armstrong Shamrocks	Vernon Royals	4-2 (best-of 7)
2003	Armstrong Shamrocks	Vernon Royals	3-2 (best-of 5)
2004	Vernon Royals	Armstrong Shamrocks	3-1 (best-of 5)
2005	Vernon Royals	Kelowna Raiders	3-0 (best-of 5)
2006	Kelowna Raiders	Vernon Royals	2-0 (best-of 3)
2007	Kelowna Raiders	Armstrong Shamrocks	2-0 (best-of 3)
2008	Kelowna Raiders	Vernon Royals	
2009	Kelowna Raiders	Kamloops Rattlers	2-0 (best-of 3)
2010	Kamloops Rattlers	Armstrong Shamrocks	2-1 (best-of 3)
2011	Kelowna Raiders	Armstrong Shamrocks	2-1 (best-of 3)
2012	Kelowna Raiders	Armstrong Shamrocks	2-0 (best-of 3)
2013	Kelowna Raiders	Kamloops Rattlers	2-0 (best-of 3)
2014	Kelowna Raiders	Armstrong Shamrocks	2-0 (best-of 3)
2015	Armstrong Shamrocks	Kelowna Raiders	2-1 (best-of 3)
2016	Armstrong Shamrocks	Kelowna Raiders	2-0 (best-of 3)
2017	Armstrong Shamrocks	Kelowna Raiders	3-0 (best-of 5)
2018	Armstrong Shamrocks	Kamloops Rattlers	5-0 (season series)
2019	N/A - Covid		
2020	N/A - Covid		
2022	Kelowna Raiders	Kamloops Rattlers	2-1 (Best of 3)
2023	Kelowna Raiders	Armstrong Shamrocks	2-0 (best of 3)
2024	Armstrong Shamrocks	Kelowna Raiders	2-1 (best of 3)
2025	Kelowna Raiders	Kamloops Rattlers	2-0 (best of 3)
