= West Central Lacrosse League =

Canadian amateur box lacrosse league

- West Central Senior Lacrosse League
- Sport: Box lacrosse
- Founded: 2003
- No. of teams: 9
- Country: Canada
- Most recent champion: Port Coquitlam Hitmen (2022)
- Website: http://wcsll.teamopolis.com

The West Central Senior Lacrosse League (WCSLL) is a men's Senior C amateur box lacrosse league sanctioned by the British Columbia Lacrosse Association in Canada.

Officially named the West Central Senior 'C' Lacrosse Association, it is usually referred to as the West Central League or just simply the 'C' League and consists of nine teams based in cities located in the Greater Vancouver area — all playing the majority of their games from a central venue located at Port Coquitlam Arena. The league schedule is typically contested from mid-April until early August.

== League history ==
Harry George Woolley founded the West Central Lacrosse League (WCLL) in fall 2002. Earlier in 2002, while being commissioner of the West Coast Senior Lacrosse Association (WCSLA) Senior B league, Woolley saw 55 players cut with nowhere to play. He completed the necessary paperwork and helped organize the WCLL get off the ground.

The vision Woolley had in establishing the West Central Lacrosse League (WCLL) was to create a recreational league that any lacrosse enthusiast could join.

=== Original teams ===
The West Central League started play in 2003 with four teams: the Abbotsford Attack, Port Coquitlam Hitmen, Port Moody Express, and Vancouver Vipers.

The Port Coquitlam Hitmen were founded by Scott Parsons. The Port Moody franchise originated after the 2002 Alcan Cup in Vernon. The Port Coquitlam Knights Senior B team, which was started by David George Wisniewski and Edward Gosse. The Knights were a ragtag team of friends that included the likes of Keith Armstrong, Julian Brambleby, Terry and Bill Mosdell, Jim Steedsman, Ritchie and Troy Baker, Sennan Joseph, Harry Preston, Mike O Reilly, David Bensmiller and Scott Parsons. This gang of misfits, that loved game came together for an Alcan cup Senior B tournament in Prince George BC. The Knights walked away with a not so, so surprising bronze medal. The next year the Knights journeyed to Vernon for a 12-team tournament as they did the year before in Prince George, realized that things needed to change. David Wisniewski told Glen "Moose" Scott (Prince George senior lacrosse commissioner) at the Alcan Cup tournament that he would be putting a Port Moody Senior C team in for the next year's Alcan Cup. The West Central League originally excluded Port Moody from the league; Surrey, Abbotsford, Vancouver and Port Coquitlam being the original teams. Port Moody, despite having a full roster and financial support, was told that this was a four team league at the league's first meeting. Surrey then later backed out and Port Moody stepped in to take their place. The original proposed name for the team was the Port Moody Beasts, but this was soon dropped in favour of the Port Moody Express. The Abbotsford Attack were started by Cam Janzen and Tom Potter as they wanted to have a box team for all the Abbotsford field players to keep their skills up over the off-season. Terry (the maniac) Kirstiuk was responsible for founding the Vancouver Vipers (named after the former Vancouver Senior B team from the late 1990s), a squad which struggled through its first season with short-benches and an inexperienced roster.

=== Seasons ===
==== 2003 ====
The first league match was played on May 10, 2003, a 9–9 tie in which Kelly Scott of Abbotsford Attack scored the league's first goal (against Port Coquitlam Hitmen). Port Moody Express and Port Coquitlam Hitmen were the dominant teams during the inaugural season, finishing 1st and 2nd respectively in the regular season standings and both met in the playoff finals with Port Coquitlam defeating Port Moody 12–10 in overtime to win the Gale Lloyd Trophy — symbolic of the league's playoff championship. In the league's consolation bronze game, the Vancouver Vipers, who went winless during the regular season, pulled off a 7–4 upset to defeat the Abbotsford Attack.

==== 2004 ====
The 2004 regular season basically saw a repeat finish of the previous year, although Port Coquitlam finished tied for points with Abbotsford. Vancouver Vipers picked up its first and only win of the regular season at the expense of Port Coquitlam. Port Moody and Port Coquitlam met again in the playoff championship, with the game going into overtime but this time Port Moody walking away with the Gale Lloyd trophy in an exciting 9–8 victory. Abbotsford defeated Vancouver 11–7 in the re-match for the bronze medal game.

One major change which occurred prior to the 2004 campaign was the adoption of one central arena location in Port Coquitlam for all games regardless which teams were playing. In the inaugural season, a different team would host games each weekend at their own home arena. Players complained about the travel (especially back-to-back Saturday-Sunday games played in Abbotsford and Vancouver-Kerrisdale) and confusion over scheduling locations, so the decision was made to centralize everything out of Port Coquitlam Arena. Since then, just over 80% of all league games have been played at Port Coquitlam Arena — with the remainder rescheduled elsewhere when not available.

==== 2005 ====
On February 23, 2005, the North Shore Indians from North Vancouver were approved and joined as the league's first expansion team. Port Coquitlam and Port Moody met yet again in the playoff finals — this time Port Coquitlam taking the trophy home with a 10–8 win.

In October 2005, during the off-season, Vancouver's executive decided to rename the team the Burrards to keep in line with all other Vancouver box lacrosse teams from minor up through to senior level.

==== 2006 ====
In 2006, the league's fourth campaign, Port Moody dropped the unpopular PoCoMo moniker and proceeded to shellshock the league with its 10–0 start. Port Moody walked away with the championship in an easy 11–3 win versus North Shore, while Abbotsford took the bronze against Vancouver.

Despite the overwhelming dominance of Port Moody (who went on to win the Alcan Cup Invitational Senior C Championship held in Prince George and then capped it up the following week with winning British Columbia Senior C provincial championships in Richmond and New Westminster), the league saw the closest parity and balanced play between teams since the league started.

==== 2007 ====
The first half of the 2007 season was fairly close, as on any given day depending on who showed up any team could beat another. As the season progressed however, Port Coquitlam, Port Moody, and North Shore were able to fortify themselves prior to the roster deadline with signing cuts to boost their fortunes in the standings as Abbotsford and Vancouver slid downwards from remaining with pretty much the same intact rosters for the entire season.

In the bronze medal game played the following day, the Abbotsford Attack held a 7–4 lead after forty minutes but then the Indians mounted yet another of their third-period comebacks. Abbotsford were able to hang on for a 9–8 victory over the North Shore Indians.

The championship game featured the fourth time the Port Moody Express and Port Coquitlam Hitmen had met in the finals. Port Coquitlam held 1-goal leads after each of the first two period, but Port Moody were then able to outscore the Hitmen 6–4 in the third-period to win the championship 15–14.

The following weekend, four teams traveled to Prince George to compete in the British Columbia Senior 'C' Provincial and Alcan Cup tournaments. In a tournament which none of the host teams were able to make the finals, Port Moody Express and Port Coquitlam participated in the provincials with Port Moody losing to Kelowna Raiders (Okanagan Xtreme League) in the gold medal game. In the Alcan Cup, North Shore Indians and Vancouver Burrards finished ahead of their Prince George opposition to meet for the gold medal, with the Indians taking the gold 10–4 in the championship game.

==== 2008 ====
On February 21, 2008, the league expanded when the West Van Outlaws from West Vancouver were accepted into the league as its sixth team. Along with the new team, the regular season schedule was increased from 12 to 15 games and the playoff final made into a best-of-three series. Expansion required the league to change its scheduling so that its Saturday night double-headers involving four teams became triple-headers involving all six teams and the bye weeks eliminated.

Port Moody Express and Port Coquitlam Hitmen battled neck and neck throughout the season for first place.

In the championship finals between Port Moody Express and North Shore Indians, the defending champion Express swept the best-of-three series 10-8 and 12–6 to win the Gale Lloyd Trophy for the third year in a row, and the fourth time in five seasons.

Port Moody Express and North Shore Indians then traveled the following week to Kelowna to represent the league in the British Columbia Senior 'C' Provincials. Port Moody won all their games in the round-robin section but lost in the gold medal game to the Kelowna Raiders. North Shore finished in third place in the four-team tournament, ahead of Vernon Royals of the Okanagan Xtreme League. In the Alcan Cup, played in Prince George the same weekend, the Vancouver Burrards were unable to repeat their silver medal appearance from the year before, losing to Regina Heat and Prince George BX Pub Bandits to finish in fifth place with a record of 1 win and 2 losses.

==== 2009 ====
The league saw further change during the off-season when it expanded to eight teams on February 26, 2009. The Coquitlam Cobras and Ladner Pioneers were accepted into the league as expansion teams while the Abbotsford Attack (now devoid of its Ladner-based players) moved across the Fraser River to Maple Ridge to become the Ridge Attack — later going by the name Maple Ridge Attack in 2010.

Port Moody Express repeated as British Columbia Senior 'C' provincial champions when they defeated the Armstrong Shamrocks and Kelowna Raiders in the three-team provincial tournament held in Armstrong during the August 14–16, 2009 weekend. In the Alcan Cup the following weekend, the Vancouver Burrards travelled to Prince George as the only visiting team entering the five-team tournament. Vancouver—who were reinforced with players picked up from the Port Moody Express and Armstrong Shamrocks—cruised through the round-robin section with a record of three wins and one loss against their Prince George opposition which then advanced them to the gold medal game for the second time in three years. They faced a re-match versus Prince George Shooters Pub Devils, against whom they had lost the previous day, but this time won 8-7 and took home their first Alcan cup title in five years.

==== 2013 ====
The league expanded back to eight teams in 2013 when Burnaby Lakers and Richmond Roadrunners joined. Vancouver Burrards adopted the North Shore Indians identity and wore their uniforms.

==== 2016 ====
The league expanded to nine teams in 2016 with the addition of the Mission Cedar Kings. Previously denied use of the Adanacs name when they joined the league in 2009, the Coquitlam Cobras were renamed Coquitlam Adanacs in 2016 to reflect the universal naming of all Coquitlam lacrosse teams from minor programmes through into senior leagues under the Adanacs name starting that year.

== Teams ==
Team	Established
Burnaby Lakers	2013
Coquitlam Adanacs	2009
Ladner Pioneers	2009
Mission Cedar Kings	2016
North Shore Indians	2003
Port Coquitlam Hitmen	2003
Port Moody Express	2003
Richmond Roadrunners	2013
Ridge Attack	2003

=== Current team name changes ===
- North Shore Indians – originally known as Vancouver Vipers (2003–2005) and Vancouver Burrards (2006–2012)
- Port Moody Express – called PoCoMo Express in 2005 season
- Ridge Attack – originally known as Abbotsford Attack (2003–2008)
- Coquitlam Cobras – originally known as Coquitlam Cobras (2009–2015)

=== Former teams ===
- North Shore Indians (2005–2009) – folded
- West Van Outlaws (2008–2009) – folded

== League executives ==
League Commissioners

- Harry Woolley (pre-season of 2003)
- Scott Parsons (2003–2004)
- Patty Bensmiller (2005)
- Trish Proulx (2006–2009)
- Keith Armstrong (2010–present)

Chairmen of Board of Governors

- Terry Kirstiuk (2003)
- Scott Parsons (2004)
- Terry Kirstiuk (2005–2006)
- Brock Rose (2007–2008)
- Craig Baldridge (2009)
- Nick Thomas (2010–present)

Secretaries

- Trish Proulx (2003–2005)
- Sandi Comack (2006–present)

Treasurers

- Trish Proulx (2003–2008)
- Betty Selezinka (2009–present)

Statisticians

- Patty Bensmiller (2003)
- Lenora Murrin (2004–2005)
- Dave Stewart-Candy (2006–2008)
- Terry Kirstiuk (2009–present)

Provincial Co-ordinator

- Nick Thomas (2010–present)

== Team executives ==
Coquitlam Cobras

- Tyler Dunlop (governor / team manager) 2009–present
- Shane Hyde (general manager) 2010–present

Ladner Pioneers

- Mike McIntosh (governor / team manager) 2009–present

Ridge Attack (Abbotsford 2003–2008)

- Cam Janzen (governor) 2003
- Tom Potter (team manager) 2003, (governor) 2004–2005
- Brian Danilkiewicz (team manager) 2004–2005, (governor / general manager) 2006–present
- Mike McIntosh (team manager) 2006–2007
- Dr. (team manager) 2013–Present

Port Coquitlam Hitmen

- Scott Parsons (governor / team manager) 2003–2004
- Paul Horn (governor / team manager) 2005
- Jamie Hurst (governor) 2006
- Rich Gareau (team manager) 2006
- Mike Gray (governor) 2007–present
- Tom Stevens (president) 2007–present
- Betty Selezinka (team manager) 2007–present

Port Moody Express

- Dave Wisniewski (governor / general manager) 2003–2006
- Craig Baldridge (governor) 2007–present
- Nick Thomas (general manager) 2007–2009; (president) 2010–present
- Jeff Dutkewich (general manager) 2010–present

Vancouver Burrards

- Terry Kirstiuk (governor / general manager) 2003–2004; 2008–present
- Terry Kirstiuk (governor) 2005–2007
- Dave Stewart-Candy (team manager) 2005–2007; (assistant governor) 2008–2010
- Andrew Rennie (assistant manager) 2009–2010

=== Former teams ===
North Shore Indians (2005–2009)

- Dave Jacobs (governor) 2005–2009
- Stewart Jacobs (president / general manager) 2005–2009

West Van Outlaws (2008–2009)

- Simon Baker (governor) 2008–2009
- Stee Baker (assistant governor) 2008–2009

== Regular season standings ==
W = Wins, L = Losses, T = Ties, OL = Overtime Losses, GF = Goals For, GA = Goals Against, PTS = Points, AS = Assists, PEN = Penalties, PIM = Penalty Minutes

2003 SEASON
TEAM	GP	W	L	T	OL	GF	GA	PTS	AS	PEN	PIM
Port Moody Express	12	10	1	1	0	112	59	21	147	-	300
Port Coquitlam Hitmen	12	7	4	1	0	122	95	15	174	-	132
Abbotsford Attack	12	5	5	2	0	94	82	12	105	-	187
Vancouver Vipers	12	0	12	0	0	49	141	0	64	-	128

Vancouver forfeited game to Port Moody 1-0 on May 10, 2003

2004 SEASON
TEAM	GP	W	L	T	OL	GF	GA	PTS	AS	PEN	PIM
Port Moody Express	12	11	1	0	0	146	78	22	180	133	364
Port Coquitlam Hitmen	12	6	6	0	0	109	91	12	138	83	201
Abbotsford Attack	12	6	6	0	0	107	107	12	128	81	234
Vancouver Vipers	12	1	11	0	0	57	143	2	69	54	168

2005 SEASON
TEAM	GP	W	L	T	OL	GF	GA	PTS	AS	PEN	PIM
Port Coquitlam Hitmen	12	9	2	1	0	103	86	19	138	78	178
PoCoMo Express	12	7	4	1	0	85	59	15	110	129	471
Vancouver Vipers	12	5	4	2	1	84	83	13	109	56	152
North Shore Indians	12	4	8	0	0	129	121	8	172	157	447
Abbotsford Attack	12	3	9	0	0	69	121	6	71	117	371

PoCoMo forfeited game 1-0 to Vancouver on July 23, 2005. Final PoCoMo vs. Vancouver game not played; result 0-0 tie

2006 SEASON
TEAM	GP	W	L	T	OL	GF	GA	PTS	AS	PEN	PIM
Port Moody Express	12	10	2	0	0	99	50	20	128	116	365
North Shore Indians	12	8	4	0	0	108	77	16	124	146	414
Vancouver Burrards	12	4	6	0	2	71	103	10	100	77	164
Abbotsford Attack	12	4	7	0	1	82	101	9	87	120	341
Port Coquitlam Hitmen	12	4	8	0	0	73	102	8	73	82	192

Port Moody forfeited game 1-0 to North Shore on July 16, 2006

2007 SEASON
TEAM	GP	W	L	T	OL	GF	GA	PTS	AS	PEN	PIM
Port Moody Express	12	9	3	0	0	107	81	18	133	138	294
Port Coquitlam Hitmen	12	8	3	1	0	101	85	15	136	112	316
North Shore Indians	12	5	5	1	1	89	93	12	112	111	291
Abbotsford Attack	12	4	6	0	2	87	95	10	118	131	378
Vancouver Burrards	12	3	8	0	1	88	118	7	106	86	202

2008 SEASON
TEAM	GP	W	L	T	OL	GF	GA	PTS	AS	PEN	PIM
Port Moody Express	15	12	3	0	0	133	92	24	151	142	415
Port Coquitlam Hitmen	15	11	4	0	0	118	97	22	154	109	293
North Shore Indians	15	8	7	0	0	127	94	16	171	185	499
West Van Outlaws	15	6	8	0	1	109	118	12	137	123	323
Abbotsford Attack	15	5	10	0	0	99	109	10	141	104	306
Vancouver Burrards	15	3	11	0	1	72	148	6	92	94	247

Abbotsford forfeited game 0-0 to Vancouver on April 12, 2008

2009 SEASON
TEAM	GP	W	L	T	GF	GA	PTS	AS	PEN	PIM
Port Moody Express	14	13	1	0	145	56	26	-	-	-
Ladner Pioneers	14	10	4	0	124	82	20	-	-	-
Port Coquitlam Hitmen	14	7	7	0	71	71	14	-	-	-
Ridge Attack	14	7	7	0	80	101	14	-	-	-
West Van Outlaws	14	7	7	0	80	95	14	-	-	-
Coquitlam Cobras	14	5	8	1	77	100	11	-	-	-
North Shore Indians	14	5	9	0	88	90	10	-	-	-
Vancouver Burrards	14	1	12	1	64	134	3	-	-	-

2010 SEASON
TEAM	GP	W	L	T	GF	GA	PTS	AS	PEN	PIM
Coquitlam Cobras	15	13	1	1	108	61	27	-	-	246
Port Moody Express	15	10	5	0	116	68	20	-	-	377
Ridge Attack	15	8	6	1	79	80	17	-	-	324
Ladner Pioneers	15	6	9	0	100	110	12	-	-	410
Port Coquitlam Hitmen	15	5	9	1	67	76	11	-	-	347
Vancouver Burrards	15	1	13	1	62	137	3	-	-	200

Ridge forfeited game 1-0 to Port Coquitlam on June 11, 2010

2011 SEASON
TEAM	GP	W	L	T	GF	GA	PTS	AS	PEN	PIM
Port Moody Express	15	14	0	1	141	57	29	-	-	242
Ladner Pioneers	15	10	5	0	109	80	20	-	-	332
Coquitlam Cobras	15	10	5	0	84	61	20	-	-	179
Port Coquitlam Hitmen	15	6	8	1	76	81	13	-	-	307
Ridge Attack	15	4	11	0	81	89	8	-	-	252
Vancouver Burrards	15	0	15	0	40	163	0	-	-	114

2012 SEASON
TEAM	GP	W	L	T	GF	GA	PTS	AS	PEN	PIM
Port Moody Express	15	12	3	0	167	103	24	-	-	303
Ladner Pioneers	15	10	4	1	151	119	21	-	-	242
Coquitlam Cobras	15	10	4	1	127	96	21	-	-	237
Ridge Attack	15	9	6	0	130	104	18	-	-	363
Port Coquitlam Hitmen	15	2	13	0	95	139	4	-	-	287
Vancouver Burrards	15	1	14	0	81	190	2	-	-	174

2013 SEASON
TEAM	GP	W	L	T	GF	GA	PTS
Port Moody Express	14	11	3	0	164	89	22
Coquitlam Cobras	14	11	3	0	137	85	22
Port Coquitlam Hitmen	14	9	5	0	114	83	18
Ladner Pioneers	14	8	6	0	128	91	16
Ridge Attack	14	8	6	0	124	104	16
Richmond Roadrunners	14	7	7	0	89	101	14
Vancouver Burrard Indians	14	1	12	1	92	175	3
Burnaby Lakers	14	0	13	1	41	161	1

Burnaby Lakers forfeited game to Port Coquitlam Hitmen 1-0 on April 20, 2012

2014 SEASON
TEAM	GP	W	L	T	GF	GA	PTS
Richmond Roadrunners	14	11	2	1	92	66	23
Coquitlam Cobras	14	11	3	0	110	67	22
Port Moody Express	14	10	3	1	117	76	21
Port Coquitlam Hitmen	14	10	4	0	103	87	20
Ridge Attack	14	5	9	0	80	96	10
Vancouver Burrard Indians	14	4	9	1	84	117	9
Ladner Pioneers	14	2	12	0	52	106	4
Burnaby Lakers	14	1	12	1	71	94	3

2015 SEASON
TEAM	GP	W	L	T	GF	GA	PTS
Port Moody Express	14	11	3	0	130	82	22
Coquitlam Cobras	14	10	4	0	102	71	20
Ridge Attack	14	9	5	0	106	89	18
Richmond Roadrunners	14	8	6	0	153	86	16
Port Coquitlam Hitmen	14	8	6	0	122	97	16
North Shore Indians	14	6	8	0	100	141	12
Ladner Pioneers	14	2	12	0	73	151	4
Burnaby Lakers	14	2	12	0	60	129	4

2016 SEASON
TEAM	GP	W	L	T	OL	GF	GA	PTS
Port Moody Express	16	13	2	1	0	128	93	27
Richmond Roadrunners	16	13	3	0	0	142	106	26
Ridge Attack	16	12	4	0	0	155	109	24
Coquitlam Adanacs	16	11	5	0	0	161	100	22
Port Coquitlam Hitmen	16	7	8	1	2	119	111	17
North Shore Indians	16	7	9	0	1	110	152	15
Mission Cedar Kings	16	4	12	0	2	102	132	10
Ladner Pioneers	16	4	12	0	0	109	148	8
Burnaby Lakers	16	0	16	0	0	92	167	0

== Playoffs ==
2003 SEASON

- SEMI-FINALS: Port Moody Express defeated Vancouver Vipers 18–6; Port Coquitlam Hitmen defeated Abbotsford Attack 13–12
- CONSOLATION GAME: Vancouver Vipers defeated Abbotsford Attack 7–4
- CHAMPIONSHIP GAME: Port Coquitlam Hitmen defeated Port Moody Express 12-10 (OT)

2004 SEASON

- SEMI-FINALS: Port Moody Express defeated Vancouver Vipers 13–6; Port Coquitlam Hitmen defeated Abbotsford Attack 8–5
- CONSOLATION GAME: Abbotsford Attack defeated Vancouver Vipers 11–7
- CHAMPIONSHIP GAME: Port Moody Express defeated Port Coquitlam Hitmen 9-8 (OT)

2005 SEASON

- SEMI-FINALS: Port Coquitlam Hitmen defeated North Shore Indians 11–10; PoCoMo Express defeated Vancouver Vipers 9–7
- CONSOLATION GAME: North Shore Indians defeated Vancouver Vipers 17–5
- CHAMPIONSHIP GAME: Port Coquitlam Hitmen defeated PoCoMo Express 10–8

2006 SEASON

- SEMI-FINALS: Port Moody Express defeated Abbotsford Attack 10–5; North Shore Indians defeated Vancouver Burrards 9–5
- CONSOLATION GAME: Abbotsford Attack defeated Vancouver Burrards 8–7
- CHAMPIONSHIP GAME: Port Moody Express defeated North Shore Indians 11–3

2007 SEASON

- SEMI-FINALS: Port Moody Express defeated Abbotsford Attack 8–4; Port Coquitlam Hitmen defeated North Shore Indians 7–2
- CONSOLATION GAME: Abbotsford Attack defeated North Shore Indians 9–8
- CHAMPIONSHIP GAME: Port Moody Express defeated Port Coquitlam Hitmen 15–14

2008 SEASON

- SEMI-FINALS: Port Moody Express defeated West Van Outlaws 12–9; North Shore Indians defeated Port Coquitlam Hitmen 12–7
- FIFTH PLACE GAME: Vancouver Burrards defeated Abbotsford Attack 8–7
- THIRD PLACE GAME: Port Coquitlam Hitmen defeated West Van Outlaws 10–2
- CHAMPIONSHIP SERIES: Port Moody Express defeated North Shore Indians 2 games to 0 (10–8; 12–6)

2009 SEASON

- QUARTER-FINALS: Port Coquitlam Hitmen defeated Coquitlam Cobras 2 games to 1 (8–3; 3–5; 8–3); West Van Outlaws defeated Ridge Attack 2 games to 0 (9–7; 9–4)
- SEMI-FINALS: Port Moody Express defeated West Van Outlaws 2 games to 1 (6–9; 6-5 OT; 7–5); Port Coquitlam Hitmen defeated Ladner Pioneers 2 games to 1 (12-8 OT; 4–10; 7–5)
- CHAMPIONSHIP SERIES: Port Moody Express defeated Port Coquitlam Hitmen 2 games to 1 (6–3; 5–6; 7–3)

2010 SEASON

- SEMI-FINALS: Coquitlam Cobras defeated Ladner Pioneers 2 games to 1 (8–7, 5–6, 9–5); Port Moody Express defeated Maple Ridge Attack 2 games to 0 (10–5, 9-6 OT)
- CHAMPIONSHIP SERIES: Port Moody Express defeated Coquitlam Cobras 2 games to 0 (9–5, 9-6 OT)

2011 SEASON

- SEMI-FINALS: Port Moody Express defeated Port Coquitlam Hitmen 2 games to 0 (6–4, 8–5); Coquitlam Cobras defeated Ladner Pioneers 2 games to 1 (6–10, 9–7, 9–5)
- CHAMPIONSHIP SERIES: Coquitlam Cobras defeated Port Moody Express 2 games to 1 (10–3, 3–7, 8–7)

2012 SEASON

- SEMI-FINALS: Port Moody Express defeated Ridge Attack 2 games to 0 (14–6, 13–9); Ladner Pioneers defeated Coquitlam Cobras 2 games to 1 (7–5, 8–13, 12–6)
- FINALS: Port Moody Express defeated Ladner Pioneers 2 games to 0 (10–8, 16–6)

2013 SEASON

- QUARTER-FINALS: Ladner Pioneers defeated Ridge Attack 10–8; Richmond Roadrunners defeated Port Coquitlam Hitmen 9–4
- SEMI-FINALS: Coquitlam Cobras defeated Ladner Pioneers 2 games to 1 (11–10, 6–9, 9–6); Richmond Roadrunners defeated Port Moody Express 2 games to 1 (5–10, 11–10, 12–10)
- FINALS: Coquitlam Cobras defeated Richmond Roadrunners 2 games to 0 (10–8, 10–8)

2014 SEASON

- QUARTER-FINALS: Port Moody Express defeated Vancouver Burrard Indians 15–5; Port Coquitlam Hitmen defeated Ridge Attack 13–9
- SEMI-FINALS: Richmond Roadrunners defeated Port Coquitlam Hitmen 2 games to 0 (9–7; 2–11); Coquitlam Cobras defeated Port Moody Express 2 games to 1 (3–11; 11–8; 9–7)
- FINALS: Coquitlam Cobras defeated Richmond Roadrunners 2 games to 0 (10–6; 8–4)

2015 SEASON

- QUARTER-FINALS: Richmond Roadrunners defeated Port Coquitlam Hitmen 8–7; Ridge Attack defeated North Shore Indians 11–9
- SEMI-FINALS: Ridge Attack defeated Coquitlam Cobras 2 games to 0 (8–4, 8–6); Port Moody Express defeated Richmond Roadrunners 2 games to 1 (7–8, 9–2, 10–6)
- FINALS: Port Moody Express defeated Ridge Attack 2 games to 1 (9–13, 11–10, 9–4)

2016 SEASON

- QUARTER-FINALS: Coquitlam Adanacs defeated Port Coquitlam Hitmen 10–4; Ridge Attack defeated North Shore Indians 12–5
- SEMI-FINALS: Port Moody Express defeated Coquitlam Adanacs 2 games to 0 (11-10 OT, 8–6); Ridge Attack defeated Richmond Roadrunners 2 games to 1 (9–8, 5-6 OT, 10–9)
- FINALS: Port Moody Express defeated Ridge Attack (5–4, 6–7, 6–4*) — Deciding game between Port Moody Express and Ridge Attack was abandoned due to unsafe floor conditions in the third period with Port Moody leading 6-4; Port Moody claimed the championship

== Playoff champions ==
Gale Lloyd Memorial Trophy
Season	Champion	Finalist	Results
2003	Port Coquitlam Hitmen	Port Moody Express	12-10 OT
2004	Port Moody Express	Port Coquitlam Hitmen	9-8 OT
2005	Port Coquitlam Hitmen	PoCoMo Express	10-8
2006	Port Moody Express	North Shore Indians	11-3
2007	Port Moody Express	Port Coquitlam Hitmen	15-14
2008	Port Moody Express	North Shore Indians	10-8; 12–6
2009	Port Moody Express	Port Coquitlam Hitmen	6-3; 5–6; 7–3
2010	Port Moody Express	Coquitlam Cobras	9-5; 9-6 OT
2011	Coquitlam Cobras	Port Moody Express	10-3, 3–7, 8–7
2012	Port Moody Express	Ladner Pioneers	10-8, 16–6
2013	Coquitlam Cobras	Richmond Roadrunners	10-8, 10–8
2014	Coquitlam Cobras	Richmond Roadrunners	10-6, 8–4
2015	Port Moody Express	Ridge Attack	11-10, 9–4
2016	Port Moody Express	Ridge Attack	5-4, 6–7, 6–4*
