= Thompson Okanagan Junior Lacrosse League =

Lacrosse league in British Columbia, Canada

- Junior B Tier 1
- Sport: Box lacrosse
- Founded: 1999
- Commissioner: Wuilbert Jaramillo
- No. of teams: 5
- Country: Canada
- Most recent champion: Kelowna Kodiaks
- Most titles: Kamloops Venom (8)
- Website: TOJLL

The Thompson Okanagan Junior Lacrosse League (TOJLL) is one of two Junior B Tier 1 box lacrosse leagues sanctioned by the British Columbia Lacrosse Association in British Columbia, Canada. The league champion competes for the British Columbia Junior B Tier 1 Provincial Championship. Teams have competed for the Founders Cup, a national tournament which determines the Canadian Junior B lacrosse champion.

== History ==
1999: Thompson-Okanagan Junior Lacrosse League founded by Dan Wray to provide a quality lacrosse environment for players aged 16 to 20. Wray first launched the concept of organized lacrosse for players in Grades 11 and 12 with an intermediate league in the Interior for three years in the late 1990s.

With a group of 1983-born players coming out of the midget ranks, Wray launched a junior B circuit for players in the valley.

The new league would begin regular season play in 2000.

2000: The league appointed Phil Reunoff as its first Commissioner.

The Rutland Raiders defeated the North Okanagan Tigers in the final series to claim the inaugural TOJLL Championship.

2001: The league had six teams: Kamloops Rattlers, Kelowna Braves, Kelowna Dragons, North Okanagan Tigers, Rutland Raiders and South Okanagan Flames to play a fifteen-game regular season.

The South Okanagan Flames were forced to forfeit three games due to ineligible player rules.

The playoffs were a best-of-three semifinals and a best-of-five finals.

2002: Cam Morrison became the league's second commissioner.

The TOJLL allowed the Prince George Posse into the league, as an exhibition team, for the eighteen-game regular season. Note: The Posse went on to a perfect (18–0–0) season.

2003: The TOJLL expanded with the inclusion of the Armstrong Shamrocks.

The North Okanagan Tigers are renamed the Vernon Tigers.

The Kelowna Braves had to forfeit seven games due to ineligible player rules, as a result the Vernon Tigers gain two wins for a perfect season (18–0–0).

The Vernon Tigers, represented the TOJLL in the Provincials, losing to the Prince George Posse, 9–7, in the gold medal game.

2004: The TOJLL hosted the Provincials which meant that two teams from the TOJLL would play in the tournament. Those teams were the Vernon Tigers (0–4 in the Provincial round robin), as host, and the Kamloops Rattlers (1–3 in the Provincial round robin) as 2004 TOJLL Champions. The Rattlers went on to play the Peninsula Falcons (2–1–1) for the bronze medal, winning 6–5.

2005: The TOJLL was represented by the league champions, Kamloops Rattlers, at the Provincials. They Rattlers came away with a silver medal, losing the final, 16–15, to the Westshore Bears.

2006: Prior to the start of the TOJLL season the Kelowna Braves and Kelowna Dragons amalgamated to form the Kelowna Warriors. With the loss of one team, the league reverted to a fifteen-game regular season.

The league initiated a pre-season schedule by including the Annual Archie Jack Memorial Ice Breaker Tournament, which is played in Armstrong, British Columbia.

The playoff format was changed to that of a (best-of-three) quarterfinals, semifinals and a (best-of-five) finals, the top two teams, of the regular season, got a first round playoff bye.

2007: Ed Kwasniewski became the league's third commissioner.

The TOJLL saw no major changes, maintaining the same regular season and playoff formats as in 2006.

The league created its first online presence, in 2007, with a website through Teamopolis Inc., which has since been disabled, using the domain name www.tojll.com.

2008: The Kamloops Venom became a member of the TOJLL. The TOJLL also welcomed the newly formed West Kootenay Wolf Pack to the league, as an exhibition team, for the now fourteen game regular season.

2009: The Vernon Tigers won the league championship and won a silver medal at the Provincials.

2010: The Kamloops Venom won the TOJLL Championship, a Provincial Gold Medal (a first for the league) and a bronze medal at the Founders Cup.

The South Okanagan Flames have the dubious honor of being the first team to go winless in a season.

2011: Prior to the start of the TOJLL season, the Kelowna Warriors and Rutland Raiders merged to become the Kelowna Raiders.

The league decided to have a fifteen-game regular season.

2012: Dan Wray became the league's fourth commissioner.

The Kamloops Rattlers ceased operations prior to the start of the season.

The remaining teams played an abbreviated schedule due to a league controversy concerning the players of the Rattlers. That issue was resolved by the BCLA... "I am writing to inform you that at an emergency meeting of the Senior Directorate, the 11-member panel voted to uphold point 5.06 in the BCLA Senior Operating Policy," wrote Christine Pollock, BCLA's senior directorate chair, in a ruling. "This allows for any junior age player residing in Kamloops to play for the Kamloops Venom, currently the only junior B team in Kamloops registered with the BCLA."

The league changed the playoff format to that of semifinals and finals, both a best-of-five series.

2013: The TOJLL regular season was increased to sixteen games.

The TOJLL was represented by, league champions, the Vernon Tigers in the Provincial Tournament. The Tigers went 0–3 in round-robin play, then lost the Bronze Medal Game, 13–9, to the Delta Islanders.

2014: The Provincial championships was hosted by the Vernon Tigers. The Delta Islanders won the final defeating Vernon, 14–7.

2015: For the second time in the TOJLL, the Vernon Tigers, had a perfect regular season (16–0–0).

2016: The league switched website providers, from Teamopolis to TeamPages, this resulted in the loss of all statistics for years 2007 to 2015.

2017: The TOJLL and Vernon Tigers hosted the Junior B Lacrosse Provincials.

The Kelowna Raiders became the first team in league history to go pointless for the regular season. They finished the season with a record of 0–16, which includes 3 defaulted games, noted as a, 1–0 loss.

2018: Guy Charron became the league's fifth commissioner, league declares themselves "tier 1" and the Kelowna Raiders folded.

The league once again, along with the league statistics from 2016 and 2017, switched website providers from TeamPages to LacrosseShift (http://tojll.lacrosseshift.com/home).

For the first time in league history there was a non-sudden death, ten minute, overtime games.

2019: The Commissioner steps down after just one year and Jeff Hanley becomes the league's (sixth) commissioner.

The Armstrong Shamrocks take a leave-of-absence for the season.

The playoffs will consist of a best-of-three semifinal between second & third place, the first place team receives a bye to the best-of-five finals.

2020: The league expands to five teams with the re-entry of the Armstrong Shamrocks, mainly with players and coach from Salmon Arm. Another new team, from Kelowna, called the Kelowna Kodiaks, is operated by the Kelowna Minor Lacrosse Association.

League cancels season due to the COVID-19 pandemic.

2021: Due to the ongoing COVID-19 pandemic there was no regular season play. With an ease of COVID-19 restrictions though, the league held a two week-end tournament-style playoffs on July 10 and July 24.

Heather Davis becomes the league's (seventh) Commissioner after Jeff Hanley vacated the office mid-term.

2022: The annual preseason tournament was cancelled. Teams played a 16-game regular season with many being rescheduled, forfeited and cancelled.

A game between the South Okanagan Flames and Kamloops Venom required the attention of the British Columbia Lacrosse Association. Kamloops originally won the game 12-4 but, the Flames protested citing an ineligible player. The game was eventually awarded to the South Okanagan Flames as a 1–0 win. The playoffs overall were very straight forward. However the Kelowna Kodiaks had to forfeit game 3 of their best-of-three series due to the arena not having enough staff to operate.

Due to an oversight by the league its Domain Name, tojll.com lapsed some time between July 6 and Sept 21, it has since been taken over by an Asian entrepreneur.

2023: The Armstrong Shamrocks merged with the Vernon Tigers to play as the Vernon Tigers for a one-year trial. They will be playing their home games in Armstrong, Vernon and Salmon Arm.

The pre-season 18th Annual Archie Jack Memorial Icebreaker Tournament was held on April 8 in the Enderby Arena. Each team was to have played two games however, the floor conditions were an injury risk so, games were cancelled or ended early. Teams played a 14-game regular season in which the Kamloops Venom had a perfect season.

2024: Armstrong and Vernon will once again play as the Vernon Tigers in a 14-game regular season.

The league adds the Cranbrook Blackwolves which, will be a probationary team for one season, to see if the TOJLL fits their needs. At a special Governors meeting, on September 18, the Blackwolves were accepted as a permanent team of the TOJLL.

2025: The Armstrong Shamrocks and Vernon Tigers announced that they take a leave-of-absence and a new team would be formed, the North Okanagan Reapers.

In January the league appointed Wuilbert Jaramillo as its eighth commissioner after Heather Davis resigned following the 2024 Provincials.

For the playoffs the league introduced a new tournament style format over one weekend. The tournament will consist of the four top teams of the regular season playing a round-robin. The top two teams, after round-robin play, will go head-to-head in a single championship game, played in Kamloops.

2026: The TOJLL will play a 16 game regular season, eight home and eight away. Two exhibition games versus the Prince George Junior Posse were played. the Posse won both games, one against the Kamloops Venom(16-6) and the other against the North Okanagan Reapers(14-8).

The league initiated a new point system for regular season games, 3pts for a win, 2pts for an overtime win, 1pt for an overtime loss, 1pt for a tie and 0pts for a loss.

The playoffs will be in the same format as 2025 but, will be played in Kelowna.

== Current teams ==
2026 - Thompson Okanagan Junior Lacrosse League
Member Teams	Centre	Founded	Arena
Cranbrook Blackwolves	Cranbrook	2020	Cranbrook Memorial Arena
Kamloops Venom	Kamloops	2008	Kamloops Memorial Arena
Kelowna Kodiaks	Kelowna	2020	Kelowna Memorial Arena
North Okanagan Reapers	Armstrong	2000	Sunbelt Sports Centre
South Okanagan Flames	Penticton	2000	Penticton Memorial Arena

== Records by season ==
2000 Thompson Okanagan Junior Lacrosse League
Team	GP	W	L	T	Pts	Playoffs
North Okanagan Tigers	14	12	2	0	24	Lost finals
Kelowna Braves	14	7	6	1	15	Lost semifinals
Kelowna Dragons	15	6	7	2	14	Lost semifinals
Rutland Raiders	15	6	8	1	13*	Champions
Kamloops Rattlers	15	6	8	1	13	Did not qualify
South Okanagan Flames	15	2	12	1	5	Did not qualify

Note: * lost points due to ineligible player

2001 Thompson Okanagan Junior Lacrosse League
Team	GP	W	L	T	Pts	Playoffs
Rutland Raiders	15	12	1	2	26	Champions
Kamloops Rattlers	15	8	5	2	18	Lost semifinals
North Okanagan Tigers	15	8	6	1	17	Lost finals
Kelowna Braves	15	7	5	3	17	Lost semifinals
Kelowna Dragons	15	4	9	2	10	Did not qualify
South Okanagan Flames	15	1	14*	0	2	Did not qualify

Note: * – forfeited 3 games

2002 Thompson Okanagan Junior Lacrosse League
Team	GP	W	L	T	Pts	Playoffs
North Okanagan Tigers	18	15	3	0	30	Champions
Rutland Raiders	18	11	7	0	22	Lost semifinals
Kelowna Dragons	18	8	9	1	17	Lost finals
Kamloops Rattlers	18	5	11	2	12	Lost semifinals
Kelowna Braves	18	3	14	1	7	Did not qualify
South Okanagan Flames	18	1	17	0	2	Did not qualify

2003 Thompson Okanagan Junior Lacrosse League
Team	GP	W	L	T	Pts	Playoffs
Vernon Tigers	18	16	2	0	36*	Champions
Kelowna Dragons	18	12	4	2	27*	Lost finals
Rutland Raiders	18	11	6	1	23	Lost semifinals
Kamloops Rattlers	18	6	11	1	15*	Lost semifinals
Armstrong Shamrocks	18	5	12	1	15*	Did not qualify
South Okanagan Flames	18	1	16	1^	6*	Did not qualify
Kelowna Braves	18	9**	9	0	4	Did not qualify

Note: ^ – Point for the forfeit due to ineligible playerv(Raiders) / ** – Points for 7 wins forfeit (and redistributed) due to ineligible player / * – Points added from forfeited games

2004 Thompson Okanagan Junior Lacrosse League
Team	GP	W	L	T	Pts	Playoffs
Rutland Raiders	18	15	2	1	31	Lost finals
Vernon Tigers	18	14	3	1	29	Lost semifinals
Kamloops Rattlers	18	13	5	0	26	Champions
Kelowna Dragons	18	9	8	1	19	Lost semifinals
Kelowna Braves	18	4	14	0	11	Did not qualify
Armstrong Shamrocks	18	3	14	1	7	Did not qualify
South Okanagan Flames	18	2	14	2	6	Did not qualify

2005 Thompson Okanagan Junior Lacrosse League
Team	GP	W	L	T	Pts	Playoffs
Kamloops Rattlers	18	15	2	1	31	Champions
Rutland Raiders	18	14	4	0	28	Lost finals
Vernon Tigers	18	10	7	1	21	Lost semifinals
South Okanagan Flames	18	8	10	0	16	Lost semifinals
Kelowna Dragons	18	6	10	2	14	Did not qualify
Armstrong Shamrocks	18	6	11	1	13	Did not qualify
Kelowna Braves	18	1	16	1	3	Did not qualify

2006 Thompson Okanagan Junior Lacrosse League
Team	GP	W	L	T	Pts	Playoffs
Kamloops Rattlers	15	13	1	1	27	Champions
Rutland Raiders	15	10	3	2	22	Lost finals
Vernon Tigers	15	8	4	3	19	Lost semifinals
South Okanagan Flames	14	4	10	0	8	Lost semifinals
Kelowna Warriors	14	2	9	3	7	Lost quarterfinals
Armstrong Shamrocks	15	1	11	3	5	Lost quarterfinals

2007 Thompson Okanagan Junior Lacrosse League
Team	GP	W	L	T	Pts	Playoffs
Kamloops Rattlers	15	12	3	0	24	Champions
Rutland Raiders	15	9	5	1	19	Lost finals
Vernon Tigers	15	8	5	2	18	Lost semifinals
Armstrong Shamrocks	14	5	8	2	12	Lost quarterfinals
Kelowna Warriors	14	5	9	0	10	Lost semifinals
South Okanagan Flames	15	2	12	1	5	Lost quarterfinals

2008 Thompson Okanagan Junior Lacrosse League
Team	GP	W	L	T	Pts	Playoffs
Kamloops Rattlers	14	11	2	1	23	Champions
Rutland Raiders	14	9	2	3	21	Lost semifinals
Kelowna Warriors	14	10	4	0	20	Lost finals
Vernon Tigers	14	6	6	2	14	Lost semifinals
Kamloops Venom	14	4	7	3	11	Lost quarterfinals
South Okanagan Flames	14	2	11	1	5	Lost quarterfinals
Armstrong Shamrocks	14	2	12	0	4	Did not qualify

2009 Thompson Okanagan Junior Lacrosse League
Team	GP	W	L	T	Pts	Playoffs
Kelowna Warriors	14	8	3	3	19	Lost semifinals
South Okanagan Flames	14	8	3	3	19	Lost semifinals
Vernon Tigers	14	8	4	2	18	Champions
Kamloops Rattlers	14	7	4	3	17	Lost quarterfinals
Kamloops Venom	14	6	6	2	14	Lost finals
Rutland Raiders	14	4	9	1	9	Lost quarterfinals
Armstrong Shamrocks	14	1	13	0	2	Did not qualify

2010 Thompson Okanagan Junior Lacrosse League
Team	GP	W	L	T	Pts	Playoffs
Vernon Tigers	14	12	1	1	25	Lost finals
Kamloops Venom	14	11	2	1	23	Champions
Kelowna Warriors	14	8	3	3	19	Lost semifinals
Kamloops Rattlers	14	6	8	0	12	Lost semifinals
Armstrong Shamrocks	14	4	9	1	9	Lost quarterfinals
Rutland Raiders	14	3	9	2	8	Lost quarterfinals
South Okanagan Flames	14	0	12	2	2	Did not qualify

2011 Thompson Okanagan Junior Lacrosse League
Team	GP	W	L	T	Pts	Playoffs
Kelowna Raiders	15	13	2	0	26	Champions
Armstrong Shamrocks	15	8	5	1	18	Lost semifinals
Kamloops Venom	15	7	7	1	15	Lost finals
Vernon Tigers	15	6	8	1	13	Lost semifinals
South Okanagan Flames	14	5	10	0	10	Lost quarterfinals
Kamloops Rattlers	14	4	11	0	8	Lost quarterfinals

2012 Thompson Okanagan Junior Lacrosse League
Team	GP	W	L	T	Pts	Playoffs
Kamloops Venom	12	13*	1	1	27	Champions
Vernon Tigers	15	8	6*	2	18	Lost finals
Armstrong Shamrocks	13	6*	8*	2	14	Lost semifinals
South Okanagan Flames	14	4*	9*	0	10	Lost semifinals
Kelowna Raiders	14	4	10*	0	9	Did not qualify

Note: * – includes default wins & losses

2013 Thompson Okanagan Junior Lacrosse League
Team	GP	W	T	L	Pts	Playoffs
Kelowna Raiders	16	12	1	3	25	Lost semifinals
Vernon Tigers	16	12	1	3	25	Champions
Kamloops Venom	16	5	1	10	11	Lost Finals
Armstrong Shamrocks	16	4	3	9	11	Lost semifinal
South Okanagan Flames	16	3	2	11	8	Did not qualify

2014 Thompson Okanagan Junior Lacrosse League
Team	GP	W	T	L	Pts	Playoffs
Kamloops Venom	16	14	1	1	29	Lost finals
Vernon Tigers	16	13	1	2	27	Champions
Armstrong Shamrocks	16	6	0	10	12	Lost semifinals
South Okanagan Flames	16	4	0	10	11	Lost semifinals
Kelowna Raiders	16	2	0	14	4	Did not qualify

2015 Thompson Okanagan Junior Lacrosse League
Team	GP	W	T	L	Pts	Playoffs
Vernon Tigers	16	16	0	0	32	Lost finals
South Okanagan Flames	16	10	0	6	20	Lost semifinals
Kamloops Venom	16	7	1	8	15	Champions
Armstrong Shamrocks	16	6	0	10	10	Lost semifinals
Kelowna Raiders	16	1	1	14	3	Did not qualify

Note: Tigers are first league team to post an official perfect season

2016 Thompson Okanagan Junior Lacrosse League
Team	GP	W	T	L	Pts	Playoffs
Vernon Tigers	16	13	1	2	27	Lost finals
Kamloops Venom	16	11	0	5	22	Champions
South Okanagan Flames	16	10	1	5	21	Lost semifinals
Armstrong Shamrocks	16	2	1	13	5	Lost semifinals
Kelowna Raiders	16	2	1	13	5	Did not qualify

Note: Tie-breaker was determined by (Head to Head)

2017 Thompson Okanagan Junior Lacrosse League
Team	GP	W	T	L	Pts	Playoffs
Kamloops Venom	16	13*	0	3*	26	Champions
Vernon Tigers	16	12	0	4	24	Lost finals
Armstrong Shamrocks	16	8*	1	7	17	Lost semifinals
South Okanagan Flames	16	6*	1	9	13	Lost semifinals*
Kelowna Raiders	16	0	0	16*	0	Did not qualify

Note: * = includes, Default wins and losses

2018 Thompson Okanagan Junior Lacrosse League
Team	GP	W	L	T	OTW	OTL	Pts	Playoffs
Vernon Tigers	12	9	1	2	0	0	20	Champions
Kamloops Venom	12	9	2	1	0	0	19	Lost finals
Armstrong Shamrocks	12	1	9	1	0	1	5	Lost semifinals
South Okanagan Flames	12	1	8	2	1	0	5	Lost semifinals

2019 Thompson Okanagan Junior Lacrosse League
Team	GP	W	L	T	Pts	Playoffs
Kamloops Venom	14	11	3	0	22	Lost finals
South Okanagan Flames	14	6	7	1	13	Champions
Vernon Tigers	14	3	10	1	7	Lost semifinals

NOTE The 2020 season was cancelled due to the COVID-19 pandemic

2021 TOJLL Covid Cup Tournament
Team	GP	W	L	T	Pts	Playoffs
Kelowna Kodiaks	4	4	4	0	8	1st
South Okanagan Flames	4	3	1	0	6	2nd
Kamloops Venom	4	2	2	0	4	3rd
Vernon Tigers	4	1	3	0	2	4th
Armstrong Shamrocks	4	0	0	0	0	5th

Note: 2021 was not an official season

2022 Thompson Okanagan Junior Lacrosse League
Team	GP	W	L	T	Pts	Playoffs
Kamloops Venom	16	13	2	1	27	Champion
Kelowna Kodiaks	16	12	4	0	24	Lost semifinal v Flames
South Okanagan Flames	16	6	9	0	13	Lost final
Vernon Tigers	16	3	10	3	9	Lost semifinal v Venom
Armstrong Shamrocks	16	2	11	3	0	Did not qualify

2023 Thompson Okanagan Junior Lacrosse League
Team	GP	W	L	T	Pts	Playoffs
Kamloops Venom	14	14	0	0	28	Champion
Vernon Tigers	14	7	7	0	14	Lost Final
South Okanagan Flames	14	5	7	2	12	Lost semifinal v Tigers
Kelowna Kodiaks	14	0	12	2	2	Lost semifinal v Venom

Note: Venom are second league team to post an official perfect season

2024 Thompson Okanagan Junior Lacrosse League
Team	GP	W	L	T	Pts	Playoffs
Kamloops Venom	16	15	5	0	30	Champion
Vernon Tigers	16	7	8	1	15	Lost Final
Kelowna Kodiaks	16	5	8	3	13	Lost Semifinal v Tigers
South Okanagan Flames	16	5	9	2	12	Lost Semifinal v Venom
Cranbrook Blackwolves	16	4	10	2	10	Did Not Qualify

2025 Thompson Okanagan Junior Lacrosse League
Team	GP	W	L	T	Pts	Playoffs
Kelowna Kodiaks	16	10	4	2	22	tied, round-robin(2nd), Champion
Kamloops Venom	16	8	6	2	18	tied, round-robin(3rd)
South Okanagan Flames	16	7	6	3	17	4th, round-robin
North Okanagan Reapers	16	5	9	2	12	tied, round-robin(1st), lost final
Cranbrook Blackwolves	16	4	10	2	10	Did Not Qualify

Note: Formula (GF+GA)/GA was used following the round-robin to break ties.

2026 Thompson Okanagan Junior Lacrosse League
Team	GP	W	OTW	OTL	T	L	PTs	Playoffs
North Okanagan Reapers	16	10	2	0	0	4	34	tied, round-robin(2nd), lost final
Kelowna Kodiaks	16	9	0	0	0	7	27	tied, round-robin(3rd)
Cranbrook Blackwolves	16	7	0	1	0	8	22	4th
Kamloops Venom	16	6	0	1	0	9	19	tied, round-robin(1st), Champion
South Okanagan Flames	16	6	0	0	0	10	18	Did Not Qualify

NOTE : Points= 3 W, 2 OTW, 1 OTL or T
Formula (GF+GA)/GA was used following the round-robin to break ties.

== Playoff recaps ==
2000: Rutland Raiders become the league's inaugural champions, defeating the North Okanagan Tigers. The two Kelowna teams the Braves and Dragons were semi finalists. The Kamloops Rattlers along with the South Okanagan Flames failed to qualify.

2001: Rutland Raiders defeated the Kelowna Braves in the semi-finals, two games to zero. The Raiders met the North Okanagan Tigers in the final and defeated them three games to two. The Tigers beat the Kamloops Rattlers two games to zero in the other semi-final.

2002: North Okanagan Tigers defeated the Kamloops Rattlers in the semi-finals, in two games. The Tigers then met up with the Kelowna Dragons in the final. The Dragons defeated the Rutland Raiders in a very close two-game sweep, in the semi-final. The North Okanagan Tigers defeated the Kelowna Dragons in three games to claim the League Championship.

2003: Vernon Tigers became champions for the second time by defeating the Kelowna Dragons in the championship final by a three-game sweep. The Tigers defeated the Kamloops Rattlers 2–0 in the semi-final. In the other semi-final, the Kelowna Dragons defeated the Rutland Raiders 2–1, in a best-of-three.

2004: Kamloops Rattlers defeated the Rutland Raiders three games to two, to claim the championship. They eliminated the Vernon Tigers in a semi-final match-up, two games to one. To get to the final, the Rutland Raiders defeated the Kelowna Dragons in a two-game sweep.

2005: Kamloops Rattlers would become the second team to win back-to-back championships. The Rattlers earned a championship final playoff berth by defeating the South Okanagan Flames in a two-game sweep. The other finals berth was earned by the Rutland Raiders, who defeated the Vernon Tigers in their semifinals series, 2–0. The Rattlers completely demolished the Raiders in that final series, winning in a three-game sweep, with a combined score of 47–18. The Venom went to the Founders Cup earning the gold medal, of the B Side Division, with a 6-4 win over the Calgary Shamrocks.

2006: The 2006 season playoffs would prove to be unique for the league as the Kamloops Rattlers would win a third consecutive League Championship. In the playoff quarter-finals best-of-three, the Vernon Tigers defeated the Armstrong Shamrocks and the Kelowna Warriors defeated the South Okanagan Flames in two-game sweeps. For the semi-finals, the Kamloops Rattlers defeated the Kelowna Warriors in two games. In the other semi-final, the Rutland Raiders won the first game against the Vernon Tigers 11–6. The Tigers would win the second game, 11–8, but had to forfeit due to an ineligible player ruling. The 2006 TOJLL Championship final series between the Kamloops Rattlers and Rutland Raiders would go the distance, best-of-five, and the Rattlers prevailed. In the Provincials, the Kamloops Rattlers garnered a bronze medal for the TOJLL, with a 10–8 win over the Westshore Bears.

2007: The format was the same as the previous season, as was the result on the floor. For an unprecedented fourth time, the Kamloops Rattlers emerged as league champions. The Rattlers defeated the Kelowna Warriors in semi-final action, 2–0 and the Rutland Raiders in the finals, 3–0. In the other playoff series, the Vernon Tigers defeated the South Okanagan Flames, 2–0 and then lost to the Raiders, 0–2. The Armstrong Shamrocks lost to the Kelowna Warriors, 2–1. The Shamrocks and Warriors only played fourteen regular season games, as a game that had to be cancelled earlier in the season was never played.

The Kamloops Rattlers hosted the Founders Cup, going 3–1 in pool A. For the playdowns the Rattlers lost to Calgary Mountaineers, won against the Sherwood Park Titans but, still failed to make the medal round.

2008: The 2008 league champions, the Kamloops Rattlers, earned a silver medal at the Provincials. In round robin play the Venom went 3–1, which secured second place. In the Provincial Gold medal game against the Coquitlam Adanacs, the score was 8–4.

The Rattlers finished first overall, in league play, and along with the Rutland Raiders received a first-round playoff bye. In the second round, the Rattlers met up with the Vernon Tigers, and defeated them two games to one. Previously the Tigers defeated the Kamloops Venom two games to one in a quarterfinal match-up. The Raiders, meanwhile, faced the Kelowna Warriors with the Warriors pulling off an upset come-from-behind series win, two games to one. The Warriors advanced from the first round and defeated the South Okanagan Flames in two games. For their fifth consecutive TOJLL Championship, the Kamloops Rattlers defeated the Kelowna Warriors in a three-game sweep.

2009: Vernon Tigers, garnered a silver medal at the Provincials. In round robin play, their record was three wins with one loss, which secured second place. In the gold medal game against the Port Moody Thunder the score ended up nine to five.

The Tigers placed third in league play and in the league final, against the Kamloops Venom, and won three games to two. The Tigers were down in the series two games to none. Vernon reached the final by having previously defeated the Rutland Raiders in the quarter-finals and the South Okanagan Flames in the semi-finals both in two game sweeps. Kamloops earned their trip to the league final by sweeping their crosstown rival Kamloops Rattlers in quarter final action,2–0 and the Kelowna Warriors in the semi-finals, 2–1. The Kelowna Warriors and the South Okanagan Flames received a first-round playoff bye for being ranked first and second, respectively, in regular season play.

2010: Kamloops Venom won the league's first Provincial Championship with a 6–4 win over the Westshore Bears (PNWJLL). During the provincial round-robin, the Venom went two wins with one loss, good for first place, to earn entry into the gold medal game.

The Venom entered the Provincials by defeating the first place Vernon Tigers three games to one, for the TOJLL Championship. The Venom had previously defeated the Kelowna Warriors in a semi final series, two game to zero. In the other semi final it was the Tigers over the Kamloops Ratters, two games to none. The Warriors defeat the Rutland Raiders in two games in the quarter-finals, and the Rattlers beat the Armstrong Shamrocks in two games.

After game four, which the Venom won 5–4 in overtime, the Vernon Tigers submitted a formal protest to the BCLA, citing an ineligible player on the Venoms roster. The BCLA ruled in favor of the Tigers, giving them the win for game four and scheduling a game five. The TOJLL Commissioner then protested the BCLAs ruling, stating that he gave the Venom permission to use this player (the Rattlers' starting goalie) only in an emergency situation. His protest was denied. The Venom submitted an official protest on the BCLA ruling, and a decision was handed down just hours prior to the start of game five, in favor of the Kamloops Venom.

The Venom went on to the Founders Cup earning a bronze medal defeating the Calgary Mountaineers, 8-3.

2011: Kelowna Raiders garnered a silver medal at the Provincials. The Raiders record in the round-robin was 2–1, losing only to the Port Moody Thunder, but earning a spot in the Finals. The Raiders would once again meet Port Moody in the final, losing by a score of 15–8.

In the TOJLL playoffs the Kamloops Venom and the Kamloops Rattlers squared off in a quarter final best-of-three match, with the Venom defeating the Rattlers 2–0. In the other quarter final it was the Vernon Tigers squeaking by the South Okanagan Flames 2–0. Semi-final action saw the Tigers take on the Raiders losing the best-of-five, 3–0 and the Venom defeat the Armstrong Shamrocks by the same 3–0. The Finals went the distance as the Raiders got past the Venom 3–2.

2012: The TOJLL playoffs were capped with a provincial championship as the Kamloops Venom garnered the league's second title. The Venom went 3–0 in the preliminary rounds, thus earning a bye to the final, defeated the Delta Islanders 6–3 in the Gold Medal Game.

The Kamloops Venom soundly defeated the South Okanagan Flames in the first two games of the best-of-five TOJLL semi-finals by scores of 14–7 and 16–5. South Ok. being short players during the playoffs forfeited game three, giving the Venom the series. In the other series it was the Vernon Tigers defeating the Armstrong Shamrocks in four games. The TOJLL final would also only go to four games as the Kamloops Venom defeated the Vernon Tigers.

The Kamloops Venom went winless at the Founders Cup ending with a record of 0–4.

2013: The Vernon Tigers defeated the Armstrong Shamrocks in the best-of-five semi-finals, 3–0. In the other series, it was the Kamloops Venom upsetting the Kelowna Raiders in four games. The TOJLL final would also go to four games as the Vernon Tigers defeated the Kamloops Venom.

In the BC Junior B Provincials the Vernon Tigers failed to win a single game. The Tigers lost to the Saanich Tigers (PNWJLL) 21–15, Delta Islanders (WCJLL) 13–2 and the WCJLL hosts, Burnaby Lakers, 11–9, during round-robin play. The Bronze Medal Game featured the third place Delta Islanders versus the fourth place Vernon Tigers, which the Islanders won 13–9.

2014: The first place Kamloops Venom defeated the South Okanagan Flames, three games to zero. The third game was not played as South Ok defaulted. In the other semi-final it was second place Vernon Tigers over powering the Armstrong Shamrocks in three straight. The Tigers would defeat the Venom, four games to one, in the league final.

The Tigers hosting the Provincials meet the Delta Islanders (WCJLL) in the final for the gold medal, losing 14–7. The Bronze Medal was won by the Kamloops Venom who defeated the Saanich Tigers (PNWJLL), 15–14.

2015: In the semifinals the first place Vernon Tigers swept fourth place Armstrong Shamrocks in a best-of-five series. South Okanagan Flames were defeated in five games to third-place finisher Kamloops Venom. The TOJLL championship final series (best-of-five), between the Tigers and Venom, was won by Kamloops (3–2).

The Venom went 1–2, in the round-robin portion of the Junior B Provincials tournament. In the bronze medal game, hosts, the Westshore Bears defeated the Venom, 25–13.

2016: For the third year in-a-row the Kelowna Raiders failed to make the playoff rounds. The semifinals featured the Vernon Tigers versus Armstrong Shamrocks and the Kamloops Venom playing the South Okanagan Flames. The Tigers and Venom each swept their best-of-five series, 3–0. The Venom went on to sweep the Tigers, 3–0, to claim the TOJLL Championship.

At the Provincials, held by the WCJLLs Coquitlam Adanacs, the Venom lost to the host, 18–4, in their first game. In the Venoms second game, they lost to the WCJLLs New Westminster Salmonbellies, 10–7. The Venoms' third game was a win, 13–12, over the PNWJLLs Saanich Tigers. The Venom failed to garner a Bronze Medal as they lost to the Tigers, 13–11.

2017: Semifinal (A), Kamloops Venom versus South Okanagan Flames was won by the Venom, 3–0. Semifinal (B), Vernon Tigers versus Armstrong Shamrocks was won by the Tigers, 3–1. The Kamloops Venom secured their 3rd consecutive league championship downing the Tigers, 3–2.

In the Provincials the, Vernon Tigers went 1–2 in round-robin, then lost the Bronze Medal Game 12–11 to the Westshore Bears of the PNWJLL. The Kamloops Venom were 2–1 in the round-robin and lost the Gold Medal Game 9–4 to the WCJLLs Coquitlam Adanacs.

2018: All teams made the playoffs, round one had the Vernon Tigers (1st) playing the South Okanagan Flames (4th) and the Kamloops Venom (2nd) took on the Armstrong Shamrocks (3rd). Both the Tigers (12–6, 14–7, 12–4) and Venom (22–8, 9–5, 17–4) swept their respective, best-of-five, series. Vernon went on to sweep the Venom (13–12, 20–7, 12–9) for the best-of-five league championship.

Citing various reasons the Tigers opted out of the Provincials versus the champions of the B.C. Jr. B Tier 1 Lacrosse League.

2019: Kamloops Venom (1st) received a bye to the finals. South Okanagan Flames (2nd) defeated Vernon Tigers (3rd), 2–1 in the best-of-three, semifinals (6–10, 16–4, 10–8)

The Flames went on to win their first TOJLL Championship, defeating the Venom, 3-1(16-15 2OT, 12–9, 7–9, 5–4).

In the Provincials the Flames were defeated by the Victoria Shamrocks of the BCJBT1LL by a two-game total-goal series, 27-10(11–6, 16–4)

2020: The regular season, playoffs and Provincials were not played due to the COVID-19 Pandemic

2021: The TOJLL held a two week-end tournament-style playoffs on July 10 and July 24.The Kelowna Kodiaks go undefeated in the tournament to claim the Covid Cup championship. The Kodiaks defeated the Kamloops Venom, 7-5 and Armstrong Shamrocks, 9–8 on July 10. They defeated the South Okanagan Flames, 11-9 and the Vernon Tigers, 9–5 on July 24.

2022: The playoffs consisted of two semifinal series, best-of-three, and a final, best-of-five. In Semifinal A the Kamloops Venom defeated the Vernon Tigers, 2–0. In Semifinal B the South Okanagan Flames upset the Kelowna Kodiaks, 2–1. The series between the Flames and Kodiaks ended in controversy as the Kodiaks had to default due "to circumstances out of their control", which was their home arena was not available. The Championship Finals saw the Kamloops Venom defeat the South Okanagan Flames, 3–0.

The Kamloops Venom hosted the Provincials versus Coquitlam Adanacs in a two-game total aggregate series. The Venom were defeated, 11-5 and 17–6, by the Adanacs.

2023: Semifinal A between Kamloops Venom and Kelowna Kodiaks was won by the Venom in two games(24-5 & 23–8) of a best-of-three. Semifinal B was tied at one game each(12-11 Tigers & 15-4 Flames) between the Vernon Tigers and South Okanagan Flames when the Flames defaulted for game three of the series citing a lack of available players resulting in a Tigers win. The league championship was won by the Kamloops Venom in three games(14–8, 6–4, 15–3) of a best-of-five over the Vernon Tigers.

The Kamloops Venom played the, host, Victoria Shamrocks of the BCJT1LL at the Provincials. The Venom were defeated, 11-8 and 18–9, by the Shamrocks.

2024: Semifinal A between Kamloops Venom and South Okanagan Flames was won by the Venom in two games of a best-of-three(17-5 & 14–4). Semifinal B was won by the Vernon Tigers over the Kelowna Kodiaks in two games(15-9 & 15–10). The league championship was won by the Kamloops Venom in three games of a best-of-five over the Vernon Tigers(15–7, 15-7 & 13–7).

The Provincials was hosted by the Kamloops Venom. The Venom were defeated by the Victoria Shamrocks in two games, 17-7 and 19–12.

2025: The playoffs consisted of the top four teams of the regular season playing a round-robin and championship game, played over three days. After round-robin play the South Okanagan Flames were eliminated, 0-3, with a three-way-tie, for first, between the Kamloops Venom, Kelowna Kodiaks and the North Okanagan Reapers all going, 2-1. Based on tie breaking criteria both the Kodiaks and Reapers advanced to the championship game while the Venom were eliminated. In the championship game the Kodiaks secured the win with a score of 14-13, in overtime, earning their first TOJLL Championship.

Provincial play saw the Kelowna Kodiaks lose to the Coquitlam Adanacs(hosts), whom won the title by winning in two games, 17-7 & 16-7.

2026: Four teams played a round-robin and championship game, played over three days. After round-robin play the Cranbrook Blackwolves were eliminated, 0-3, with a three-way-tie, for first, between the Kamloops Venom, Kelowna Kodiaks and the North Okanagan Reapers all going, 2-1. Based on tie breaking criteria both the Venom and Reapers advanced to the championship game while the Kodiaks were eliminated. In the championship game the Venom secured the win with a score of 11-7, earning their ninth TOJLL Championship.

Provincial play saw the Kamloops Venom(hosts) lose to the Port Coquitlam Saints, whom won the title by winning in two games, 18-7 & 10-5.

== Champions ==
Season	Champion	Runner-up	Series	Provincials
2000	Rutland Raiders	North Okanagan Tigers		
2001	Rutland Raiders	North Okanagan Tigers	3–2	
2002	North Okanagan Tigers	Kelowna Dragons	3–0	
2003	Vernon Tigers	Kelowna Dragons	3–0	Vernon Tigers (Silver)
2004	Kamloops Rattlers	Rutland Raiders	3–2	Vernon Tigers (Hosts-5th), Kamloops Rattlers (Bronze)
2005	Kamloops Rattlers	Rutland Raiders	3–0	Kamloops Rattlers (Silver)
2006	Kamloops Rattlers	Rutland Raiders	3–2	Kamloops Rattlers (Bronze)
2007	Kamloops Rattlers	Rutland Raiders	3–0	Kamloops Rattlers (Bronze), Rutland Raiders (Hosts-Silver)
2008	Kamloops Rattlers	Kelowna Warriors	3–0	Kamloops Rattlers (Silver)
2009	Vernon Tigers	Kamloops Venom	3–2	Vernon Tigers (Silver)
2010	Kamloops Venom	Vernon Tigers	3–1	Kamloops Venom (Gold)
2011	Kelowna Raiders	Kamloops Venom	3–2	Kamloops Venom (Hosts-Bronze), Kelowna Raiders (Silver)
2012	Kamloops Venom	Vernon Tigers	3–1	Kamloops Venom (Gold)
2013	Vernon Tigers	Kamloops Venom	3–1	Vernon Tigers (4th)
2014	Vernon Tigers	Kamloops Venom	3–1	Vernon Tigers (Hosts-Silver), Kamloops Venom (Bronze)
2015	Kamloops Venom	Vernon Tigers	3–2	Kamloops Venom (4th)
2016	Kamloops Venom	Vernon Tigers	3–0	Kamloops Venom (4th)
2017	Kamloops Venom	Vernon Tigers	3–2	Vernon Tigers (Hosts-4th), Kamloops Venom (Silver)
2018	Vernon Tigers	Kamloops Venom	3–0	No Provincials
2019	South Okanagan Flames	Kamloops Venom	3–1	Lost, 2 game aggregate, 27–10, to Victoria Shamrocks
2020	Did not play	Due to Covid Pandemic	N/A	No Provincials
Season	Champion	Round-robin	RR Result	Provincials
2021*	Kelowna Kodiaks	1st	4-0	No Provincials
Season	Champion	Runner-up	Series	Provincials
2022	Kamloops Venom	South Okanagan Flames	3-0	Lost, 2 game aggregate, 28–11, to Coquitlam Adanacs
2023	Kamloops Venom	Vernon Tigers	3-0	Lost best-of-3, 2–0 to Victoria Shamrocks
2024	Kamloops Venom	Vernon Tigers	3-0	Lost best-of-3, 2-0 to Victoria Shamrocks
Season	Champion	Runner-up	Game	Provincials
2025	Kelowna Kodiaks	North Okanagan Reapers	14-13 OT	Lost best-of-3, 2-0, to Coquitlam Adanacs
2026	Kamloops Venom	North Okanagan Reapers	11-7	Lost best-of-3, 2-0, to Port Coquitlam Saints

- - Covid Cup Championship (Not An "Official" Season)

=== Wins by club ===
Club	Wins	Years
Kamloops Venom	9	2010, 2012, 2015, 2016, 2017, 2022, 2023, 2024, 2026
Vernon Tigers	6	2002, 2003, 2009, 2013, 2014, 2018
Kamloops Rattlers	5	2004, 2005, 2006, 2007, 2008
Rutland Raiders	3	2000, 2001, 2011
South Okanagan Flames	1	2019
Kelowna Kodiaks	1	2021*, 2025

- - Covid Cup Championship (Not An "Official" Season)

== Former member teams ==
Kelowna Braves: (2000–2005) – merged with Kelowna Dragons; formed the Kelowna Warriors
Kelowna Dragons (2000–2005) – merged with Kelowna Braves; formed the Kelowna Warriors
North Okanagan Tigers (2000-2002) - renamed Vernon Tigers
Kelowna Warriors (2006–2010) – merged with Rutland Raiders, formed the Kelowna Raiders
Rutland Raiders (2000–2010) – merged with Kelowna Warriors, formed the Kelowna Raiders
Kamloops Rattlers (2000–2011) – folded
Kelowna Raiders (2011–2017) – folded
Armstrong Shamrocks (2003-2022) - granted a leave-of-absence for 2023 & 2024 - merged with Vernon Tigers
Vernon Tigers (2003-2024) granted a leave-of-absence
