= British Columbia Lacrosse Association =

Canadian provincial sports governing body

British Columbia Lacrosse Association (BCLA) is a sanctioning body in British Columbia, Canada. Empowered by the Canadian Lacrosse Association, the BCLA controls and regulates Minor level, Junior and Senior level box lacrosse and field lacrosse in the province.

== Box lacrosse leagues ==
Senior

- Western Lacrosse Association (Senior A)
  - West Coast Senior Lacrosse Association (Senior B)
    - Prince George Senior Lacrosse League (Senior C)
    - Thompson Okanagan Senior Lacrosse League (Senior C)
    - Vancouver Island Senior Lacrosse League (Senior C)
    - West Central Lacrosse League (Senior C)

Junior

- British Columbia Junior A Lacrosse League
  - Pacific Northwest Junior Lacrosse League (Junior B)
  - Thompson Okanagan Junior Lacrosse League (Junior B)
  - West Coast Junior Lacrosse League (Junior B)

== Senior C ==
Teams from the four BCLA Senior C leagues compete in a post-season provincial championship for the Fred Doig Cup. The award for Most Sportsmanlike Team receive the Dorothy Robertson Trophy.

Select teams compete in an invitational tournament hosted by a member team. Tournament winners are awarded the Treasure Cove Trophy.

When the tournaments coincide, teams which compete for the Fred Doig Cup are allowed just three pickup players.

Year	Provincial champion (Fred Doig Cup)	Invite Tournament winner
2003	Prince George Skeetos Pub Assault	Victoria Jokers
2004	Port Moody Express	Prince George Steamers Pub Devils
2005	Prince George Steamers Pub Devils	Prince George Steamers Pub Devils
2006	Port Moody Express	Port Moody Express
2007	Kelowna Raiders	North Shore Indians
2008	Kelowna Raiders	Prince George Steamers Pub Devils
2009	Port Moody Express	Vancouver Burrards
2010	none	Prince George BX Pub Bandits
2011	Port Moody Express	Port Moody Express
2012	Port Moody Express	Port Moody Express
2013	Port Moody Express	Port Moody Express
2014	Westwood Pub Devils	Westwood Pub Devils
2015	Port Moody Express	Ridge Attack

== Leadership ==
Executive Director: Rochelle Winterton

Technical Director: Dave Showers

Marketing Director: Jeff Gombar

Administrative Assistant: Deb Heard
