= Field lacrosse =

Full contact outdoor men's team sport

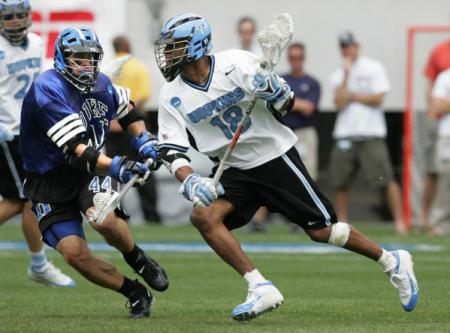
- Kyle Harrison advancing, pursued by an opponent
- Highest governing body: World Lacrosse
- Nicknames: Lax, The Medicine Game, The Creator’s Game
- First played: As early as the 12th century C.E., North America; Codified in 1867

Characteristics
- Contact: Full contact (men's)
- Team members: 10 per team, including goaltender
- Equipment: Ball, stick, helmet, gloves, shoulder pads, arm pads

Presence
- Olympic: Summer Olympics in 1904 and 1908. Demonstrated in 1928, 1932, and 1948; Will be featured in the 2028 Summer Olympics (sixes format)

Field lacrosse is a full contact outdoor sport played with two opposing teams of 10 players each. The sport originated among Native Americans, and the modern rules of field lacrosse were initially codified by Canadian William George Beers in 1867. Field lacrosse is one of three major versions of lacrosse played internationally. The rules of men's lacrosse differ significantly from women's field lacrosse (established in the 1890s). The two are often considered to be different sports with a common root. An outdoor six-a-side version, lacrosse sixes, was established in 2021 and features six players per team, reduced field size, and shorter duration to be conducive for daily tournament play. Another version, indoor box lacrosse (originated in the 1930s), is also played under different rules.

The object of the game is to use a lacrosse stick, or crosse, to catch, carry, and pass a solid rubber ball in an effort to score by shooting the ball into the opponent's goal. The triangular head of the lacrosse stick has a loose net strung into it that allows the player to hold the lacrosse ball. In addition to the lacrosse stick, players are required to wear a certain amount of protective equipment. Defensively the object is to keep the opposing team from scoring and to dispossess them of the ball through the use of stick checking and body contact. The rules limit the number of players in each part of the field. It is sometimes referred to as the "fastest sport on two feet".

Lacrosse is governed internationally by the 62-member World Lacrosse, which sponsors the World Lacrosse Championships once every four years. Field lacrosse is played professionally in North America by the Premier Lacrosse League. It is also played on a high amateur level by the National Collegiate Athletic Association in the United States, the Canadian University Field Lacrosse Association and the Maritime University Field Lacrosse League in Canada, and the Australian Senior Lacrosse Championship series in Australia.

== History ==
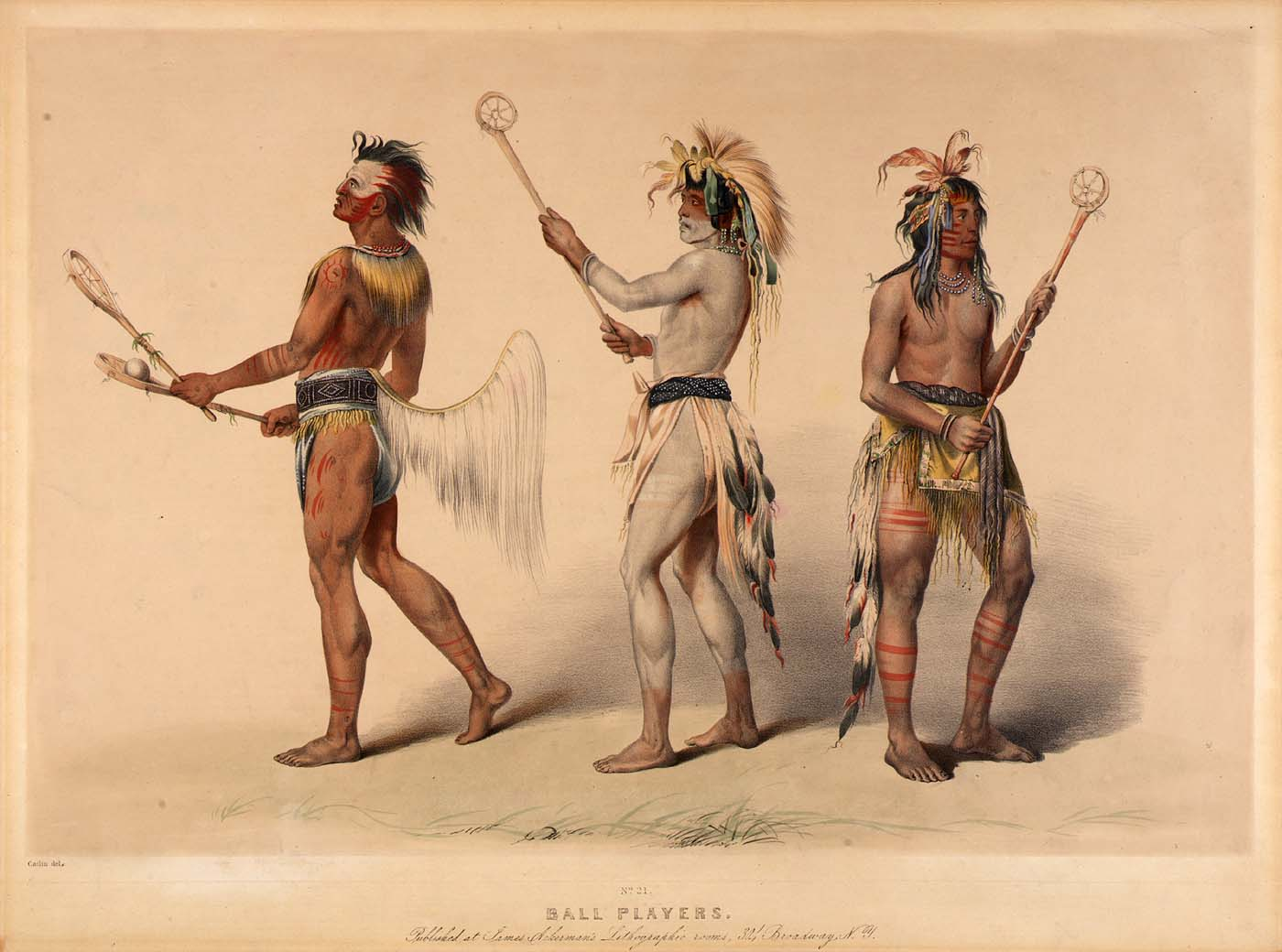
"Ball players", a colored lithograph by George Catlin, illustrates various Native Americans playing lacrosse.

Lacrosse is a traditional Native American game. According to Native American beliefs, playing lacrosse is a spiritual act used for healing and giving thanks to the Creator. Another reason to play the game is to resolve minor conflicts between tribes that were not worth going to war for, thus the name "little brother of war". These games could last several days and as many as 100 to 1,000 men from opposing villages or tribes played on open plains, between goals ranging from 500 yards (460 m) to several miles apart.

The first Europeans to observe it were French Jesuit missionaries in the St. Lawrence Valley in the 1630s. The name "lacrosse" comes from their reports, which described the players' sticks as like a bishop's crosier—la crosse in French. The Native American tribes used various names: in the Onondaga language it was called dehuntshigwa'es ("they bump hips" or "men hit a rounded object"); da-nah-wah'uwsdi ("little war") to the Eastern Cherokee; in Mohawk, tewaarathon ("little brother of war"); and baggataway in Ojibwe. Variations in the game were not limited to the name. In the Great Lakes region, players used an entirely wooden stick, while the Iroquois stick was longer and was laced with string, and the Southeastern tribes played with two shorter sticks, one in each hand.

In 1867, Montreal Lacrosse Club member William George Beers codified the modern game. He established the Canadian Lacrosse Association and created the first written rules for the game, Lacrosse: The National Game of Canada. The book specified field layout, lacrosse ball dimensions, lacrosse stick length, number of players, and number of goals required to determine the match winner.

== Rules ==
The rules presented below are for the men's game, which differs significantly from women's lacrosse. Field lacrosse involves two teams, each competing to shoot a lacrosse ball into the opposing team's goal. A lacrosse ball is made out of solid rubber, measuring 7.75 to 8 inches (19.7–20 cm) in circumference and weighing 5 to 5.25 ounces (140–149 g). Traditionally in the men's game the ball is white in color while in the women's game a yellow ball is used. In recent years the Premier Lacrosse League has adopted an "optic yellow" ball (similar in color to a tennis ball) for easier visibility on television broadcasts; NCAA college lacrosse will move to optic yellow balls in 2028, with teams permitted to use either white or optic yellow balls in 2027. Yellow, orange, or pink balls are also permitted in adverse weather conditions or other special circumstances. Each team plays with ten players on the field: a goalkeeper; three defenders in the defensive end; three midfielders free to roam the whole field; and three attackers attempting to score goals in the offensive end. Players are required to wear some protective equipment, and must carry a lacrosse stick (or crosse) that meets specifications. Rules dictate the length of the game, boundaries, and allowable activity. Penalties are assessed by officials for any transgression of the rules.

The game has undergone significant changes since Beers' original codification. In the 1930s, the number of players on the field per team was reduced from twelve to ten, rules about protective equipment were established, and the field was shortened.

=== Playing area ===
Diagram of a men's college lacrosse field.

A standard lacrosse field is 110 yards (100 m) in length from each endline, and 60 yards (55 m) in width from the sidelines.

Field lacrosse goals are centered between each sideline, positioned 15 yards (14 m) from each endline and 80 yards (73 m) apart from one another. Positioning the goals well within the endlines allows play to occur behind them. The goal is 6 feet (1.8 m) wide by 6 feet (1.8 m) tall, with nets attached in a pyramid shape. Surrounding each goal is a circular area known as the "crease," measuring 18 feet (5.5 m) in diameter.

If a player enters the "crease" while shooting toward the goal, the referee will call a foul and the ball gets turned over to the other team.

A pair of lines, 20 yards (18 m) from both the midfield line and each goal line, divides the field into three sections. From each team's point of view, the one nearest its own goal is its defensive area, then the midfield area, followed by the attack or offensive area. These trisecting lines are called "restraining lines." A right angle line is marked 10 yards (9.1 m) from each sideline connecting each endline to the nearer restraining line, creating the "restraining box." If an official deems that a team is "stalling," that is not moving with offensive purpose while controlling the ball, the possessing team must keep the ball within the offensive restraining box to avoid a loss-of-possession penalty.

Field markings dictate player positioning during a face-off. A face-off is how play is started at the beginning of each period and after each goal. During a face-off, there are six players (without considering goalkeepers) in each of the areas defined by the restraining lines. Three midfielders from each team occupy the midfield area, while three attackmen and three of the opposing team's defensemen occupy each offensive area. These players must stay in these areas until possession is earned by a midfielder or the ball crosses either restraining line. Wing areas are marked on the field on the midfield line 10 yards (9.1 m) from each sideline. This line indicates where the two nonface-off midfielders per team lineup during a face-off situation. These players may position themselves on either side of the midfield line. During a face-off, two players lay their sticks horizontally next to the ball, head of the stick inches from the ball and the butt-end pointing down the midfield line. Once the official blows the whistle to start play, the face-off midfielders scrap for the ball to earn possession and the other midfielders advance to play the ball. If possession is won by the face-off player, he may move the ball himself or pass to a teammate.

The rules also require that substitution areas, a penalty box, coaches area, and team bench areas be designated on the field.

=== Equipment ===
A field lacrosse player's equipment includes a lacrosse stick, and protective equipment, including a lacrosse helmet with face mask, lacrosse gloves, and arm and shoulder pads. Players are also required to wear mouthguards and athletic supporter with cup pocket and protective cup. However, field players in the PLL are not required to wear shoulder pads.

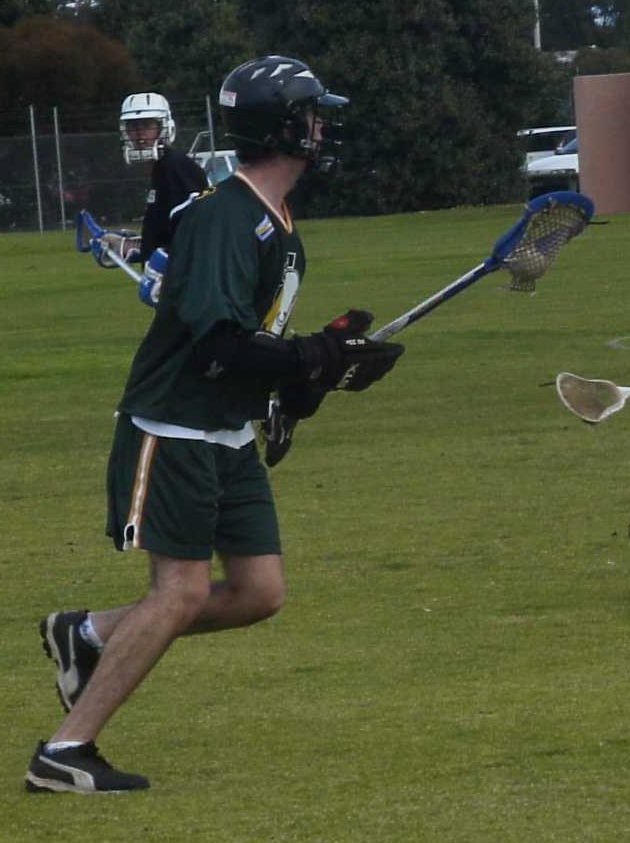
A typically equipped field player, carrying a "short crosse"

Each player carries a lacrosse stick measuring 40 to 42 inches (1.0–1.1 m) long (a "short crosse"), or 52 to 72 inches (1.3–1.8 m) long (a "long crosse"). In most modern circles the word crosse has been replaced by "stick" and the terms "short stick" and "long stick" or "pole" are used. On each team up to four players at a time may use a long crosse: the three defensemen and one midfielder. The crosse is made up of the head and the shaft (or handle). The head is roughly triangular in shape and is loosely strung with mesh or leathers and nylon strings to form a "pocket" that allows the ball to be caught, carried, and thrown. In field lacrosse, the pocket of the crosse is illegal if the top of the ball, when placed in the head of the stick, is below the bottom of the stick's sidewall.

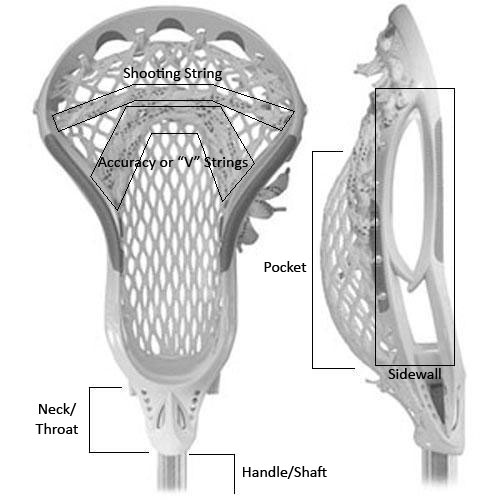
Head of a men's lacrosse stick

The maximum width of the head at its widest point must be between 6 and 10 inches (15–25 cm). From 1.25 inches up from the bottom of the head, the distance between the sidewalls of the crosse must be at least 3 inches. Most modern sticks have a tubular metal shaft, usually made of aluminum, titanium, or alloys, while the head is made of hard plastic. Metal shafts must have a plastic or rubber cap at the end.

The sport's growth has been hindered by the cost of a player's equipment: a uniform, helmet, shoulder pads, hand protection, and lacrosse sticks. Many players have at least two lacrosse sticks prepared for use in any contest. Traditionally players used sticks made by Native American craftsman. These were expensive and, at times, difficult to find. The introduction of the plastic heads in the 1970s gave players an alternative to the wooden stick, and their mass production has led to greater accessibility and expansion of the sport.

=== Players ===
==== Goalkeeper ====
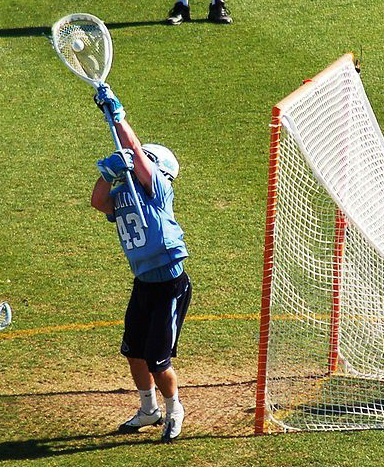
A goalkeeper making a save

The goalkeeper's responsibility is to prevent the opposition from scoring by directly defending the 6-foot-wide (1.8 m) by 6-foot-tall (1.8 m) goal. A goalkeeper needs to stop shots that are capable of reaching over 100 miles per hour (160 km/h), and is responsible for directing the team's defense.

Goalkeepers have special privileges when they are in the crease, a circular area surrounding each goal with a radius of 9 feet (2.7 m). Offensive players may not play the ball or make contact with the goalkeeper while he is in the crease. Once a goalkeeper leaves the crease, he loses these privileges.

A goalkeeper's equipment differs from other players'. Instead of shoulder pads and elbow pads, the goalkeeper wears a chest protector. He also wears special "goalie gloves" that have extra padding on the thumb to protect from shots. The head of a goalkeeper's crosse may measure up to 15 inches (38 cm) wide, significantly larger than field players'.

==== Defensemen ====
A defenseman is a player position whose responsibility is to assist the goalkeeper in preventing the opposing team from scoring. Each team fields three defensemen. These players generally remain on the defensive half of the field. Unless a defenseman gets the ball and chooses to run up the field and try to score or pass, by doing this they will need to cross the midfield line and signal one midfielder to stay back. A defenseman carries a long crosse which provides an advantage in reach for intercepting passes and checking.

Tactics used by defensemen include body positioning and checking. Checking is attempting to dispossess the opposition of the ball through body or stick contact. A check may include a "poke check", where a defenseman thrusts his crosse at the top hand or crosse of the opponent in possession of the ball (similar to a billiards shot), or a "slap check", where a player applies a short, two-handed slap to the hand or crosse of the opponent in possession of the ball. A "body check" is allowed as long as the ball is in possession or a loose ball is within five yards of the opposing player and the contact is made to the front or side of the torso of the opposing player. Defensemen preferably remain in a position relative to their offensive counterpart known as "topside", which generally means a stick and body position that forces a ball carrier to go another direction, usually away from the goal.

==== Midfielders ====
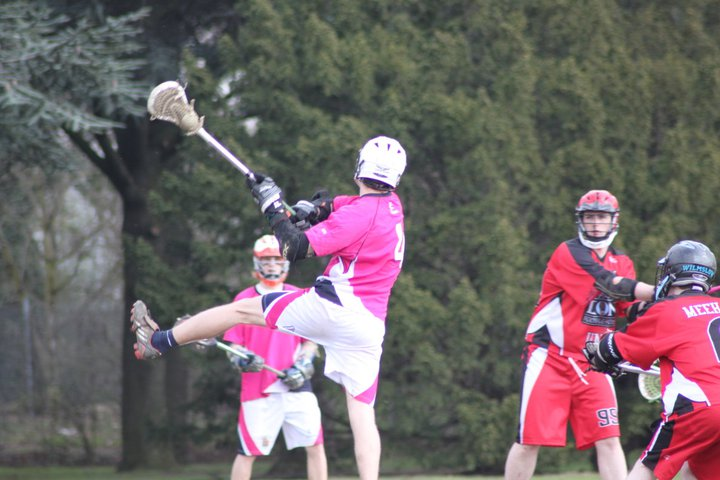
A lacrosse player shooting during a game.

Midfielders contribute offensively and defensively and may roam the entire playing area. Each team fields three midfielders at a time. One midfielder per team may use a long crosse, and in this case is referred to as a "long-stick midfielder." Long-stick midfielders are normally used for defensive possessions and face-offs but can participate in offense as long as they are not subbed off.

Over time, the midfield position has developed into a position of specialties. During play, teams may substitute players in and out freely, a practice known as "on the fly" substitution. The rules state that substitution must occur within the designated exchange area in front of the players' bench. Teams frequently rotate the midfielder specialists off and on the field depending on the ball possession. Some teams have a designated face-off midfielder, referred to as a "fogo" midfielder (an acronym for "face-off and get-off"), who takes the majority of face-offs and is quickly substituted after the face-off. Some teams also designate midfielders as "offensive midfielders" or "defensive midfielders" depending on their strengths and weaknesses.

==== Attackmen ====
Each team fields three attackmen at a time, and these players generally remain on the offensive half of the field. An attackman uses a short crosse. Attackmen are commonly attributed as the players most responsible for shooting and scoring goals against the opposing teams goalie. The attackmen are also responsible for stopping the goalie and defensemen when they attempt to perform a "clear" (when the goalie has saved a shot and is attempting to return the ball to their attackmen).

=== Duration and tie-breaking methods ===
Duration of games depends upon the level of play. In international competition, college lacrosse, and Major League Lacrosse, the total playing time is 60 minutes, composed of four 15-minute quarters, plus a 15-minute intermission at halftime. High school games typically consist of four 12-minute quarters but can be played in 30-minute halves, while youth leagues may have shorter games. The clock typically stops during all dead ball situations such as between goals or if the ball goes out of bounds. The method of breaking a tie generally consists of multiple overtime periods of 5 minutes (4 in NCAA play, 10 in [MLL/PLL]) in which whoever scores a goal is awarded a sudden victory. A quicker variant of the sudden victory is the Braveheart method in which each team sends out one player and one goalie; it is then sudden victory. International lacrosse plays two straight 5-minute overtime periods, and then applies the sudden victory rule if the score is still tied.

=== Ball movement and out of play ===
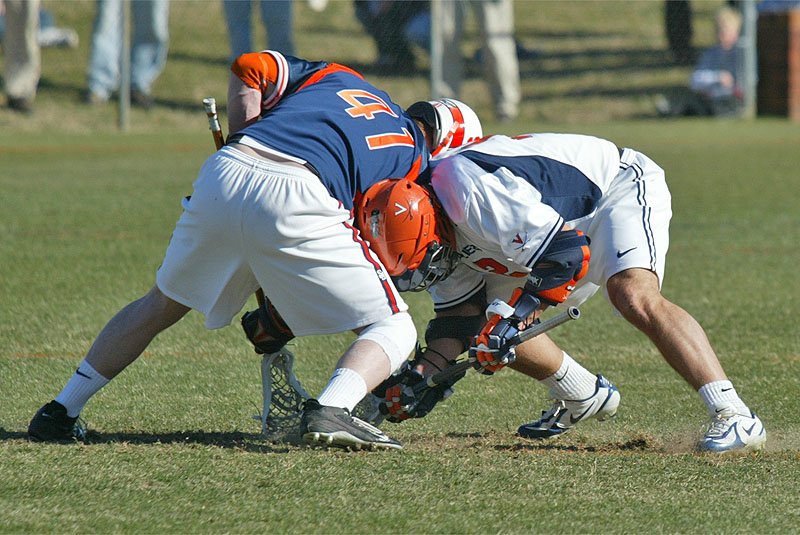
A face-off

Teams must advance the ball or be subjected to loss of possession. Once a team gains possession of the ball in their defensive area, they must move the ball over the midfield line within 20 seconds. If the goalkeeper has possession of the ball in the crease he must pass the ball or vacate the area within four seconds. Failure by the goalkeeper to leave the crease will result in the opposite team being given possession just outside the restraining box. Once the ball crosses the midfield line, a team has 10 seconds to move the ball into the offensive area designated by the restraining box or forfeit possession to their opponents. The term used to define moving the ball from the defensive to offensive area is to "clear" the ball. Offensive players are responsible for "riding" opponents, in other words attempting to deny the opposition a free "clear" of the ball over the midfield line.

If a ball travels outside of the playing area, play is restarted by possession being awarded to the opponents of the team which last touched the ball, unless the ball goes out of bounds due to a shot or a deflected shot. In that case, possession is awarded to the player that is closest to the ball when it leaves the playing area.

=== Penalties ===
For most fouls, the offending player is sent to the penalty box and his team has to play without him and with one fewer player for a short amount of time. Penalties are classified as either personal fouls or technical fouls. Personal fouls are of a more serious nature and are generally penalised with a 1-minute suspension. Technical fouls are violations of the rules that are not as serious as personal fouls, and are penalised for 30 seconds or a loss of possession. Occasionally a longer penalty may be assessed for more severe infractions. Players penalised for 6 personal fouls must sit out the game. The penalised team is said to be playing man down defense while the other team is on the man up, or playing "extra man offence." During a typical game, each team will have three to five extra man offence opportunities.

==== Personal fouls ====
Personal fouls (PF) include slashing, tripping, illegal body checking, cross checking, unsportsmanlike conduct, unnecessary roughness, and equipment violations. While a stick-check (where a player makes contact with the opposition player's stick in order to knock the ball loose) is legal, a slashing violation is called when a player viciously makes contact with an opposing player or his stick. An illegal body check penalty is called for any contact where the ball is further than 5 yards (4.6 m) for high school and 3 yards (2.7 m) for youth from the contact, the check is from behind, above the shoulders or below the knees, or was avoidable after the player has released the ball. Cross checking, where a player uses the shaft of his stick to push the opposition player off balance, is illegal in field lacrosse. Both unsportsmanlike conduct and unnecessary roughness are subject to the officiating crew's discretion, while equipment violations are governed strictly by regulations. Any deliberate intent to injure opponents risks immediate disqualification. For penalties resulting in a player being suspended from the game, a substitute player must serve the offender's penalty time.

==== Technical fouls ====
Technical fouls include holding, interference, pushing, illegal offensive screening (usually referred to as a "moving pick"), "warding off", stalling, and off-sides. A screen, as employed in basketball strategy, is a blocking move by an offensive player, by standing beside or behind a defender, to free a teammate to shoot, or receive a pass; as in basketball players must remain stationary when screening. Warding off occurs when an offensive player uses his free hand to control the stick of an opposing player.

Offside has a unique implementation in field lacrosse. Instituted with rule changes in 1921, it limits the number of players that are allowed on either side of the midfield line. Offside occurs when there are fewer than three players on the offensive side of the midfield line or when there are fewer than four players on the defensive half of the midfield line (note: if players are exiting through the special-substitution area, it is not to be determined an offside violation).

A technical foul requires that the defenseman who fouled a player on the opposing team be placed in the penalty box for 30 seconds. As with a personal foul, until the penalty time expires, no replacement for the player is allowed and the team must play one man short. The player (or a replacement) is allowed to reenter the game once the time in the penalty box is over and the team is thus once again at full strength.

== Domestic competition ==
College lacrosse, a spring sport in the United States, saw its earliest program established by New York University in 1877. The first intercollegiate tournament was held in 1881 featuring four teams: New York University, Princeton University, Columbia University, and Harvard University. This tournament was won by Harvard. The United States Intercollegiate Lacrosse Association (USILA) was created in 1885, and awarded the inaugural Wingate Memorial Trophy to the University of Maryland as national champions in 1936. The award was presented to the team (or teams) with the best record until the National Collegiate Athletic Association (NCAA) instituted a playoff system in 1971. The NCAA sponsored its premier Men's Lacrosse Championship with the 1971 tournament where Cornell University defeated University of Maryland in the final. In addition to the three divisions in the NCAA, college lacrosse in the United States is played by non-varsity Men's Collegiate Lacrosse Association and National College Lacrosse League club teams.

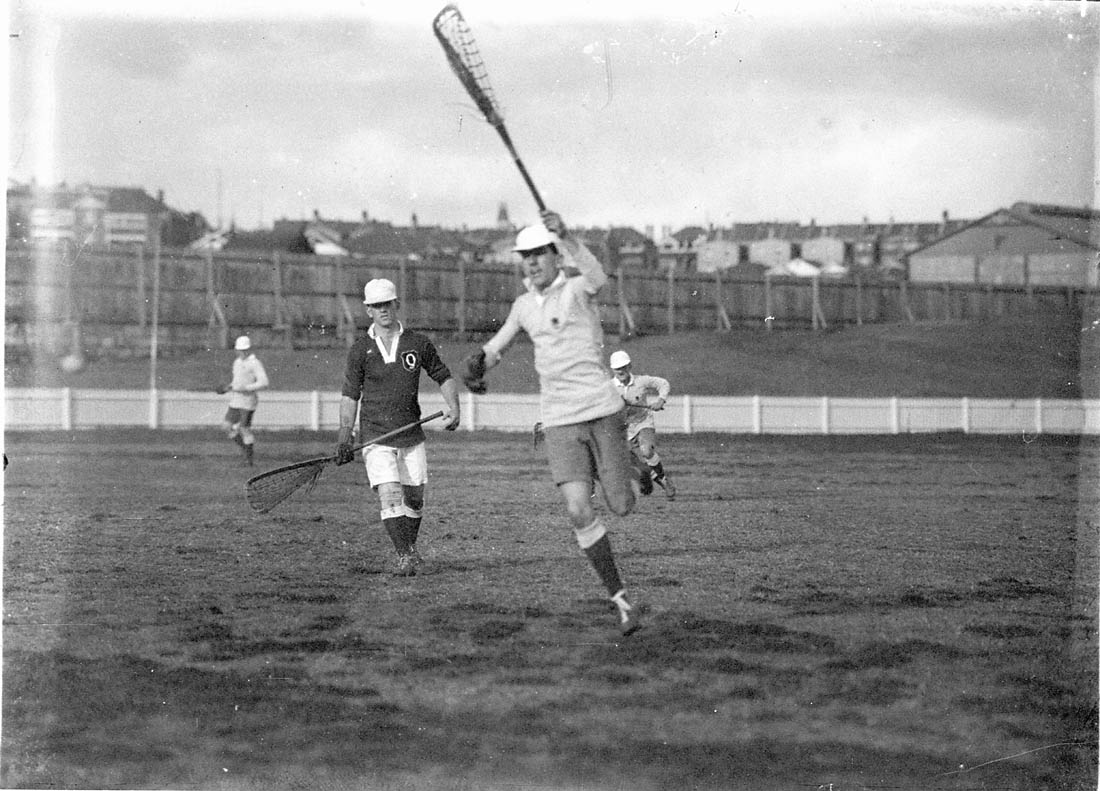
Lacrosse in Australia, about 1930

Lacrosse was first witnessed in England, Scotland, Ireland and France in 1867 when a team of Native Americans and Canadians traveled to Europe to showcase the sport. The year after, the English Lacrosse Association was established. In 1876, Queen Victoria attended an exhibition game and was impressed, saying, "The game is very pretty to watch." Throughout Europe, lacrosse is played by numerous club teams and is overseen by the European Lacrosse Federation. Lacrosse was brought to Australia in 1876. The country sponsors various competitions among its states and territories that culminate in the annual Senior Lacrosse Championship tournament.

In 1985, the Canadian University Field Lacrosse Association (CUFLA) was established, with twelve universities in the Ontario and Quebec provinces competing in the intercollegiate league. The league plays its season during the autumn. Unlike the NCAA, the CUFLA allows players that are professional box lacrosse players in the National Lacrosse League to participate, stating that "although stick skills are identical, the game play and rules are different".

In 2005, a second Canadian University field lacrosse league, the Maritime University Field Lacrosse League (MUFLL) was founded, with six universities in the New Brunswick and Nova Scotia provinces.

Professional field lacrosse made its first appearance in 1988 with the formation of the American Lacrosse League, which folded after five weeks of play. In 2001, professional field lacrosse resurfaced with the inception of Major League Lacrosse (MLL), whose teams, based in the United States and Canada, play during the summer. The MLL modified its rules from the established field lacrosse rules of international, college, and high school programs. To increase scoring, the league employed a sixty-second shot clock, a two-point goal for shots taken outside a designated perimeter, and reduced the number of long sticks to three rather than the traditional four. Prior to the 2009 MLL season, after eight seasons, the league conformed to traditional field lacrosse rules and allowed a fourth long crosse. In 2018, the Premier Lacrosse League launched with 140 players leaving the MLL to form a league with higher media exposure, salaries, healthcare, licensing access, and other benefits. These 140 players consisted of 86 All-Americans, 25 members of the U.S. national team, and 10 former Tewaaraton Award winners. Both leagues merged in 2021, leaving the PLL as the sole men's pro field lacrosse league in North America. The PLL has a variety of rule differences compared to field lacrosse. Like the MLL, the PLL also has two-point goals for goals scored outside of a certain perimeter. The field of play is shorter by 10 yards in the PLL. The distance between the goal line and the end line remain the same. The PLL also has a 52-second shot clock on possessions gained from defensive stops and other turnovers. The shot clock is 32-seconds from possessions gained off of face-offs and offensive rebounds.

== International competition ==
World Lacrosse is the international governing body of lacrosse and it oversees field, women's and box lacrosse competitions. In 2008, the International Lacrosse Federation and the International Federation of Women's Lacrosse Associations merged to form the Federation of International Lacrosse. The former International Lacrosse Federation was founded in 1974 to promote and develop the game of men's lacrosse throughout the world. In May 2019, FIL changed its name to World Lacrosse. World Lacrosse sponsors the World Lacrosse Championship and Under-19 World Lacrosse Championships which are played under field lacrosse rules. It also oversees the World Indoor Lacrosse Championship played under box lacrosse rules, and the Women's Lacrosse World Cup and an under-19 championship under women's lacrosse rules.

=== Olympic Games ===
Lacrosse at the Olympics was a medal-earning sport in the 1904 Summer Olympics and the 1908 Summer Olympics. In 1904, three teams competed in the games held in Saint Louis, Missouri. Two Canadian teams, the Winnipeg Shamrocks and a team of Mohawk people from the Iroquois Confederacy, and an American team represented by the local St. Louis A.A.A. lacrosse club participated, and the Winnipeg Shamrocks captured the gold medal. The 1908 games held in London, England, featured only two teams, representing Canada and Great Britain. The Canadians again won the gold medal in a single championship match by a score of 14–10.

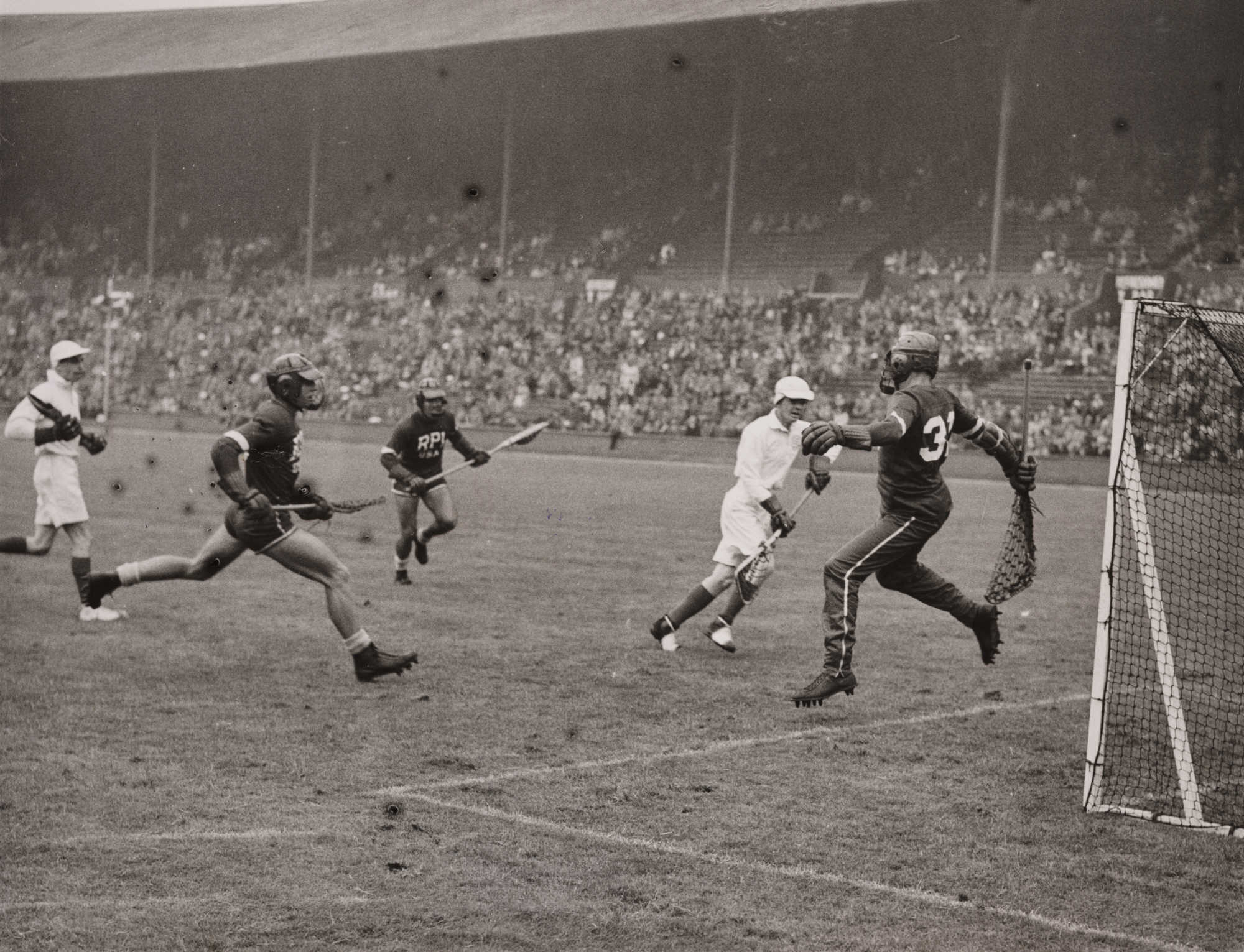
1948 Summer Olympics in London

In the 1928 Summer Olympics, 1932 Summer Olympics, and the 1948 Summer Olympics, lacrosse was a demonstration sport. The 1928 Olympics featured three teams: the United States, Canada, and Great Britain. The 1932 games featured a three-game exhibition between a Canadian All-star team and the United States. The United States was represented by Johns Hopkins Blue Jays lacrosse in both the 1928 and 1932 Olympics. In order to qualify, the Blue Jays won tournaments in the Olympic years to represent the United States. The 1948 games featured an exhibition by an "All-England" team organized by the English Lacrosse Union and the collegiate lacrosse team from Rensselaer Polytechnic Institute representing the United States. This exhibition ended in a 5–5 tie.

There have been obstacles to reestablishing lacrosse as an Olympic sport. One hurdle was resolved in 2008, when the international governing bodies for men's and women's lacrosse merged to form the Federation of International Lacrosse, which was later renamed World Lacrosse. Another obstacle has been insufficient international participation. In the past, in order to be considered as an Olympic sport the game had to be played on four continents, and with at least a total of 75 countries participating. According to one US Lacrosse representative in 2004, "it’ll take 15-20 years for us to get there." For the 1996 Summer Olympics in Atlanta, Georgia and 2000 Summer Olympics in Sydney, Australia, efforts were made to include lacrosse as an exhibition sport, but these failed. However, nowadays numeric criteria about widely practiced sports have been abolished. The International Olympic Committee granted provisional status to World Lacrosse in 2018 and Lacrosse may be included in the 2028 Summer Olympics. In August 2022, It was announced that nine sports had made the shortlist to be included in the games, among them lacrosse, with presentations expected to be made later that month. In October 2023, the LA28 Organizing Committee announced that it had recommended lacrosse as one of five sports that may be added to the program for the 2028 Summer Olympics. On October 16, 2023 the IOC approved lacrosse to be included in the 2028 Olympics. The competition will take place in the lacrosse sixes format.

=== World Lacrosse Championships ===
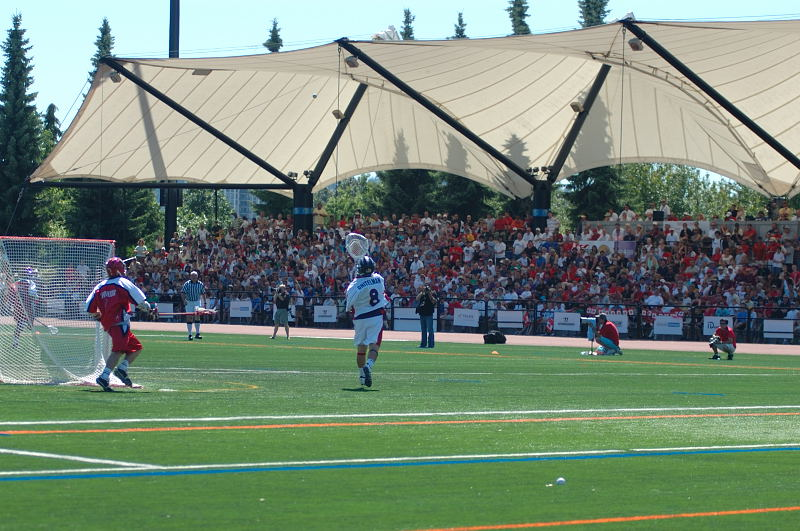
The 2008 Men's U-19 World Lacrosse Championship final featured USA versus Canada

The World Lacrosse Championship began as a four-team invitational tournament in 1967 sanctioned by the International Lacrosse Federation. The 2006 World Lacrosse Championship featured a record twenty-one competing nations. The 2010 World Lacrosse Championship took place in Manchester, England. Only United States, Canada, and Australia have finished in the top two places of this tournament. Since 1990, the Iroquois Nationals, a team consisting of the Six Nations of the Iroquois Confederacy members, have competed in international competition. This team is the only Native American team sanctioned to compete in any men's sport internationally. The Federation of International Lacrosse also sanctions the Under-19 World Lacrosse Championships. The 2008 Under-19 World Lacrosse Championships included twelve countries, with three first-time participants: Bermuda, Finland, and Scotland.

Other regional international competitions are played including the European Lacrosse Championships, sponsored by the twenty-one member European Lacrosse Federation, and the eight team Asian Pacific Lacrosse Tournament.

=== World Games ===
Men's field lacrosse was played at the 2022 World Games in Birmingham, Alabama using the "Sixes" ruleset. Qualification for the tournament was based on the nations placement at the 2018 World Lacrosse Championship. Initially, the Iroquois Nationals were not included in the qualified teams, however, they were determined to be eligible for the tournament, and Ireland voluntarily withdrew from the tournament to allow them to participate. Canada won gold, the U.S. took silver, and Japan defeated Great Britain for the bronze medal.

== Attendance records ==
Lacrosse attendance has grown with the sport's popularity. The 2008 NCAA Division I Men's Lacrosse Championship was won by Syracuse University, beating Johns Hopkins University 13–10, in front of a title game record crowd of 48,970 fans at Gillette Stadium. The 2007 NCAA Division I Men's Lacrosse Championship weekend held at M&T Bank Stadium in Baltimore, Maryland, was played in front of a total crowd of 123,225 fans for the three-day event. The current attendance record for a regular season lacrosse-only event was set by the 2009 Big City Classic, a triple-header at Giants Stadium which drew 22,308 spectators. The Denver Outlaws hold the professional field lacrosse single-game attendance record by playing July 4, 2015 in front of 31,644 fans.

At the 1932 Olympics in Los Angeles, California, over 145,000 spectators watched the three-game series between the United States and Canada, including 75,000 people who witnessed the first game of the series while in attendance to watch the final of the marathon.
