= Lacrosse helmet =

Protective headgear used in lacrosse

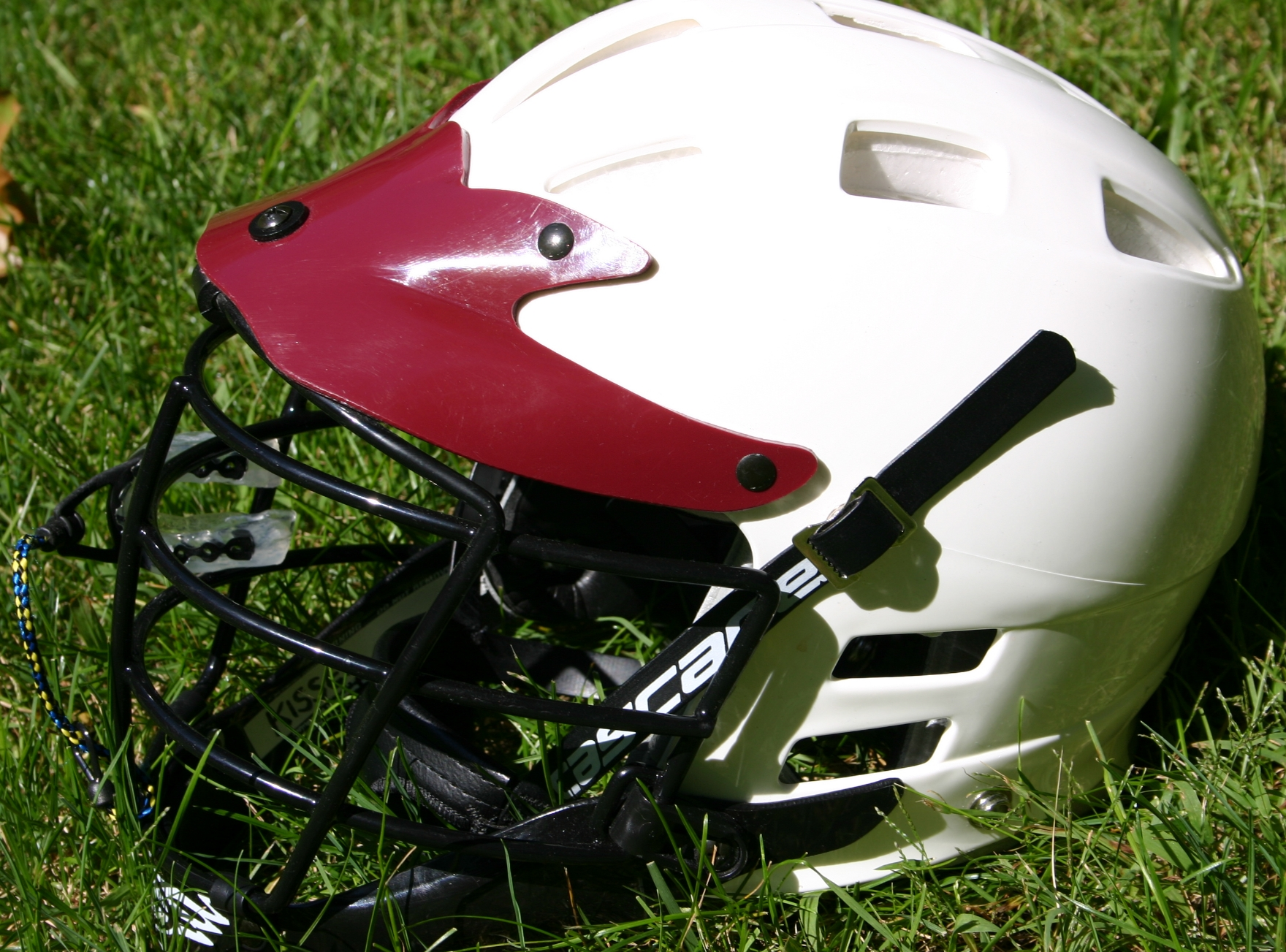
A typical lacrosse helmet

A lacrosse helmet is a helmet worn primarily in men's lacrosse, but also worn optionally by women's lacrosse players in Australia. Modern helmets consist of a hard plastic, non-adjustable shell with thick padding on the inside, a face mask made of metal bars, and a chinstrap used to secure the helmet to the head. Some players also attach a sun visor shielding the eyes, though these visors are not legal in most leagues (unless they are clear).

Helmets are required at all levels of organized men's lacrosse, but required only for goalies in women's lacrosse.

The main difference between helmets is weight, field of vision, and fit. It is important that the lacrosse helmet fit snugly to limit injury. Most helmets in the game today offer ways of adjusting the helmet size so that fit can be customized. Lacrosse helmets are riddled with air vents to increase air flow and decrease its weight. All helmets come with an adjustable chin strap for added protection.

== History ==
Early lacrosse players did not wear helmets. When lacrosse was played at the 1908 Summer Olympics, neither of the competing teams wore helmets. At the 1928, 1932 and 1948 Olympics where lacrosse was a demonstration sport, only the United States wore helmets while the opposing teams did not. The 1928 Olympics was the first documented use of lacrosse helmets.

== Manufacturers ==
The most common manufacturers in men's lacrosse are Cascade, Warrior, Brine, and STX.

== Helmet use in women's lacrosse ==
Following a number of head injuries to female players in the 1980s in South Australia, players and coaches moved to adopt the optional use of protective headgear in the women's game. As the movement — led by Australian 1986 World Champions players Wendy Piltz and Jenny Williams and South Australia coach Peter Koshnitsky — grew, players were given authorization on a trial basis to wear close-fitting, full-face helmets, first by South Australia and then by the governing body, the Australian Women's Lacrosse Council (AWLC). Further efforts were made to have the optional helmet rule adopted at the international level of play but were unsuccessful.

In the United States, the governing body, US Lacrosse requires the use of protective goggles and mouth guards but has not endorsed helmet use with the exception of goal keepers (goalies).

In the United States, the Florida High School Athletics Association (FHSAA), the governing body of high school athletics in the State of Florida, made helmets mandatory equipment for girls lacrosse at the Varsity and sub-Varsity levels beginning with the 2018 season. As of 2019, Florida is the only state to mandate the use of helmets in girls lacrosse. Helmets are not required in girls travel or recreation-level lacrosse.

== See also ==
- Impact monitor
