= Women's lacrosse =

Team sport

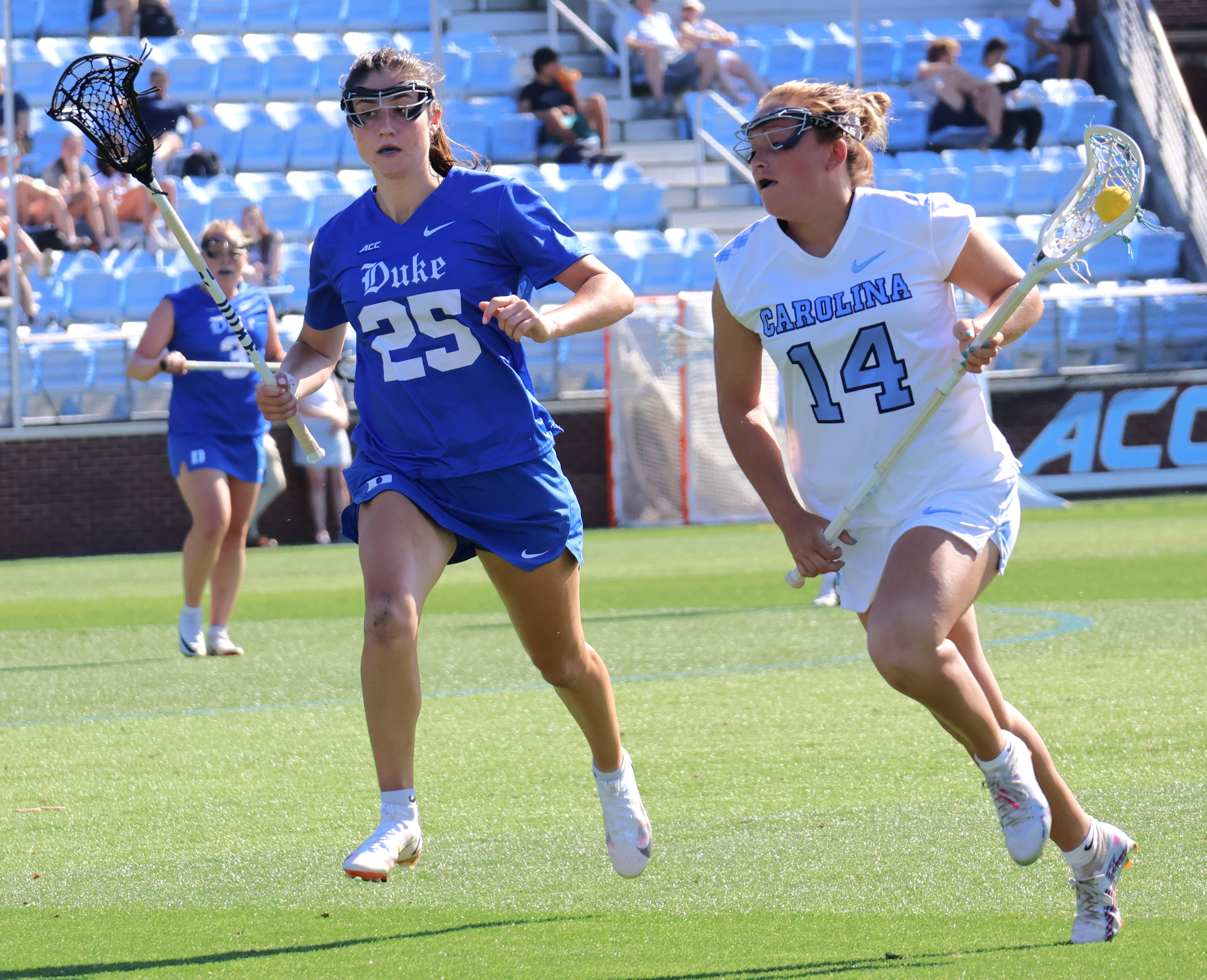
- First played: 17 May 1890, at St Leonards School in Scotland

Characteristics
- Contact: Limited
- Team members: International: 10 at a time, 1 goalie and 9 players (United States: 12 at a time, 1 goalie and 11 players)
- Equipment: Lacrosse ball, lacrosse stick, goggles, mouthguard

Presence
- Olympic: No
- World Games: 2017 – present

Women's field lacrosse (or girls' field lacrosse), sometimes shortened to lax, is a field sport played at the international level with two opposing teams of ten players each (12 players per team at the U.S. domestic level). Originally played by indigenous peoples of the Americas, the modern women's game was introduced in 1890 at the St Leonard's School in St Andrews, Scotland. The rules of women's lacrosse differ significantly from men's field lacrosse. The two are often considered to be different sports with a common root.

The object of the game is to use a long-handled stick (known as a crosse or lacrosse stick) to catch, cradle, and pass a solid rubber lacrosse ball in an effort to score by hurling the ball into an opponent's goal. Cradling is a technique of moving the wrists and arms in a semi-circular motion to keep the ball in the pocket of the stick's head using centripetal force. The head of the lacrosse stick has a mesh or leather net strung into it that allows the player to hold the ball. Defensively, the object is to keep the opposing team from scoring and to dispossess them of the ball through the use of stick checking and body positioning. The rules of women's lacrosse are different from the men's lacrosse game. Equipment required to play is also different from the men's. In the United States, women are only required to wear eyewear or lacrosse goggles and a mouth guard. The stick has restrictions too, as it must be a certain length and the pocket must be shallow enough to show the ball above the side when held at eye level.

At the collegiate level in the United States, lacrosse is represented by the National Collegiate Athletic Association (NCAA), which conducts three NCAA Women's Lacrosse Championships, one for each of its competitive divisions, each spring. Internationally, women's lacrosse has a thirty-one-member governing body called World Lacrosse, which sponsors the Women's Lacrosse World Cup once every four years.

== History ==
French Jesuit missionaries in the St. Lawrence Valley introduced the game of lacrosse, a traditional Native American game, to Europeans in the 1630s. The games were sometimes major events that could last several days. As many as 100 to 1,000 men from opposing villages or tribes would participate. Native American lacrosse describes a broad variety of stick-and-ball games played by them. Geography and tribal customs dictated the extent to which women participated in these early game:

"Lacrosse, as women play it, is an orderly pastime that has little in common with the men's tribal warfare version except the long-handled racket or crosse (stick) that gives the sport its name. It's true that the object in both the men's and women's lacrosse is to send a ball through a goal by means of the racket, but whereas men resort to brute strength the women depend solely on skill." Rosabelle Sinclair

The first modern women's lacrosse game was played in 1890 at the St Leonards School in Scotland, where women's lacrosse had been introduced by Louisa Lumsden. Lumsden brought the game to Scotland after watching a men's lacrosse game between the Canghuwaya (probably Caughnawaga) Indians and the Montreal Lacrosse Club. A British school teacher, Cara Gascoigne, at Sweet Briar College, started club lacrosse at that college in 1914. One of Lumsden's students, Rosabelle Sinclair, established the first women's lacrosse team in the United States at the Bryn Mawr School in Baltimore, Maryland, in 1926. The first women's intercollegiate game was held between Sweet Briar College and the College of William & Mary in 1941.

Until the mid-1930s, women's and men's field lacrosse were played under virtually the same rules, with no protective equipment. In the United States, the formation of the U.S. Women's Lacrosse Association led to a change in these rules. On the world stage, the International Federation of Women's Lacrosse Associations (today, World Lacrosse) was founded by Margaret Boyd, All-England Club player from 1934–51 and captain from 1937–51. Following World War II, she worked as a lacrosse coach in the United States and elsewhere for two decades.

Since 2001, the Tewaaraton Award has been given annually to the male and female voted most outstanding player at the college level in the US.

== Rules ==
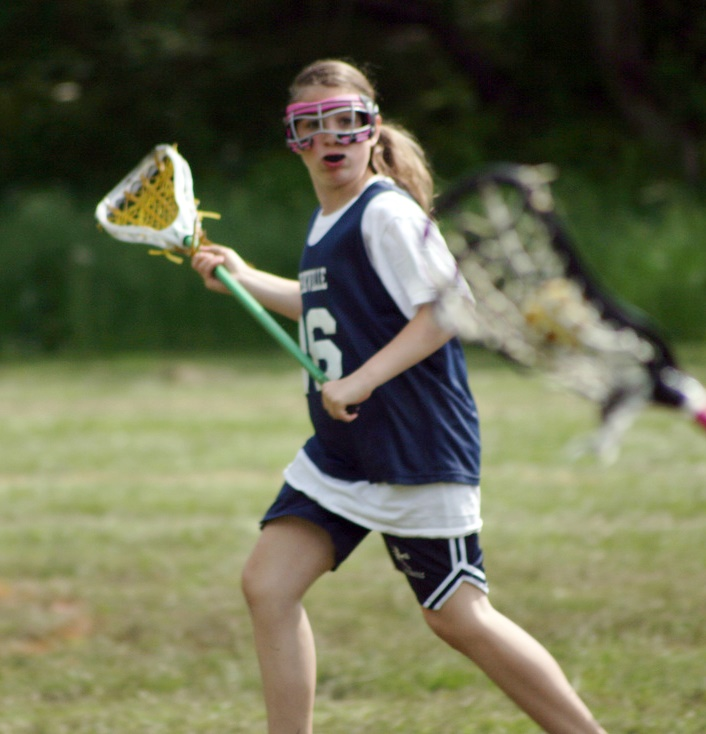
A lacrosse player in action

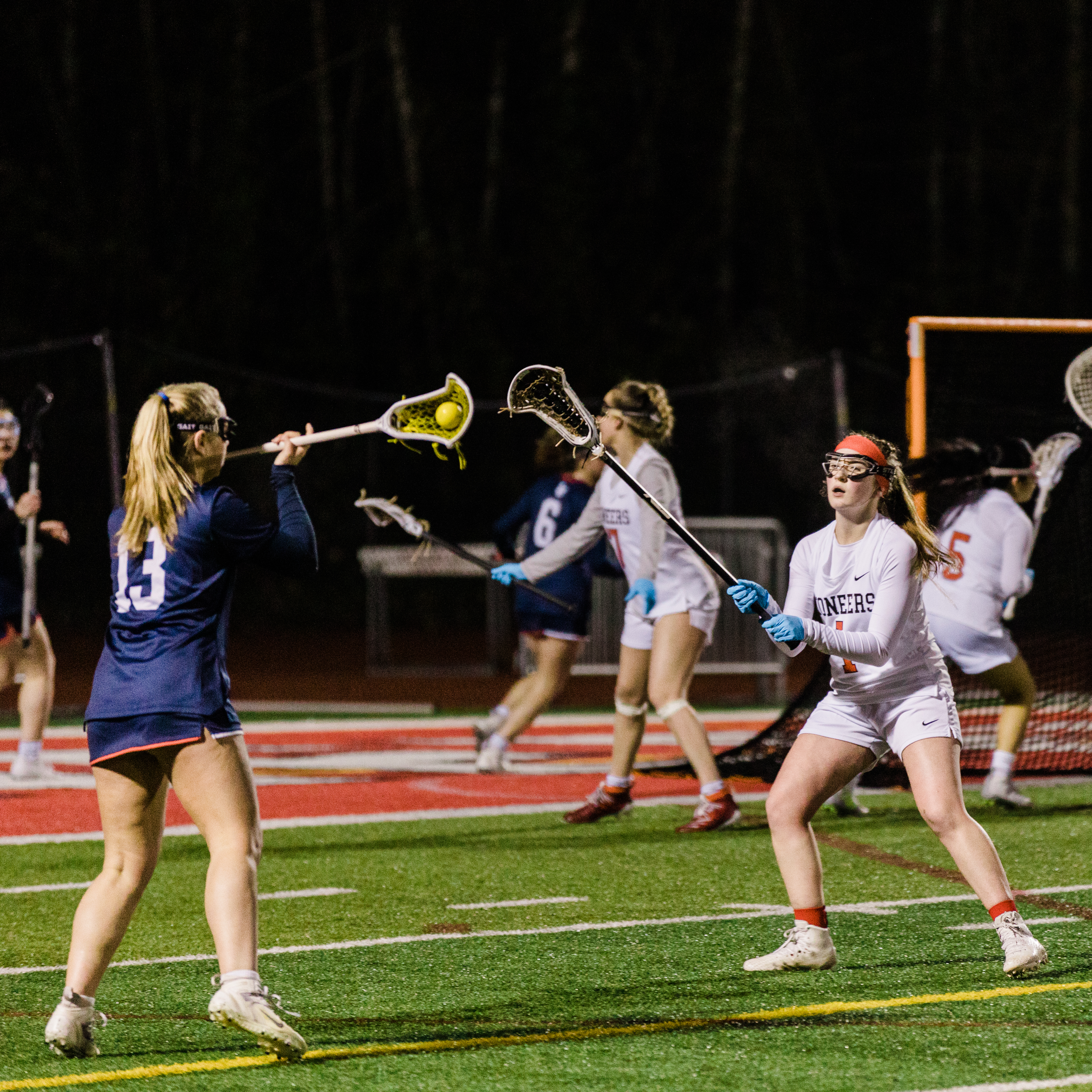
Girls' high school lacrosse players in Oregon, United States

The details that follow are the United States college rules. In the U.S., 12 players constitute a full team, including the goalkeeper during usual play. The ball used in women's lacrosse is yellow (men's lacrosse uses a white ball). The duration of the game is 60 minutes split into four 15-minute quarters, with a two-minute break following the first and third quarters. Halftime is ten minutes unless both the coaches agree prior to the start of the game on fewer minutes. Each team is allowed three 2 minute team timeouts. A time-out may be requested by the head coach or any player on the field. With the addition of free-movement to both U.S. Lacrosse and NCAA rule codes, players are no longer required to drop their sticks in place during a timeout.

Before a game can begin, every stick that each player is planning on using during the game must be approved by the referee; the process is called a "stick check". The evaluation is based on a set of standards created by U.S. Lacrosse and the NCAA. These standards may change as new sticks are being created by lacrosse equipment companies. During a stick check, a standard lacrosse ball is placed into the head of the stick and viewed by the referee at eye level. If the ball cannot be seen over the top of the side-wall of the head of the stick, then the pocket is too deep for play. The stick may also be checked by placing the ball in and tilting the stick at about a 45 degree angle and letting the ball roll down and out of the stick. This occurs on both the back and the front of the stick. If the ball gets stuck, then the pocket is too deep and the strings must be adjusted. A pocket that is deeper than regulation causes an unfair advantage for the individual with the stick. If the stick pocket is too deep, this can be fixed by tightening the stringing, but if a stick's pocket depth cannot be adjusted to regulation, the stick cannot be used in the game. An example of a stick stringing regulation is that the shooting string attachment must be 3.5 inches (89 mm) from the top of the head. After a player scores a goal, the player must drop her stick so that the referee can check that the stick is within regulation. This rule applies only in collegiate and professional lacrosse, while in high school and club play, as long as the stick is cleared prior to play, it does not have to be checked after a goal is scored. However, a coach may request a stick check following a goal, and if the goal-scorer's stick pocket is too deep or the stick is non-standard, the goal will be overruled. Also, throughout the game, an opposing team may challenge a player's stick, meaning asking the referee to check that a player's stick is legal for play.

The rules of women's lacrosse differ significantly from men's lacrosse. In international women's lacrosse, 10 players constitute a full team, and its rules differ slightly from the U.S. rules.

The women's lacrosse game saw numerous rule changes in 2000. Modifications included limiting the number of players allowed between the two restraining lines on the draw to five players per team. This rule has since been modified so that only three members per team may be within the restraining lines prior to either team gaining possession of the ball after the draw. Stick modifications have led to offset heads, which allow the women's game to move faster and makes stick moves and tricks easier. The stick became similar to the men's stick, with a deeper pocket and more rounded head. In 2002, goggles became mandatory equipment in the United States (but not a requirement in international rules). In 2006, hard boundaries were adopted. Prior to hard boundaries, referees stopped play when the action moved too far away. Passes that were thrown out of bounds would be awarded to the team closest to the ball. After this rule change, balls lost out of bounds became turnovers and were awarded to the opposing team, except on a shot, in which case, the player closest to the ball at the time it went out of bounds would have possession. One of the rules for player safety is called "shooting space", which prohibits a defender from running directly into the shooting lane of the player about to shoot in order to obstruct a shot on goal. The shooting lane can be visualized by imagining two lines extending from the ball carrier, one going to the left side of the goal circle, and the other going to the right. The defender cannot enter this space unless they are within a stick's length of the shooter. To avoid this, the defender must run up at an angle to the player about to shoot. This violation can only be called if the defender is in the critical scoring area and the attacker is within the 12-meter with the ability to shoot.

In 2013, women's NCAA lacrosse included a changed rule on defending. When their team does not possess the ball, players in their defending end of the field may run through any portion of the 8-meter arc for as long as three seconds without marking an attacker. Players that are on attack are not allowed to run through the goal circle.

In 2015, for the 2016 season, there were a few other major rule changes. Players are allowed to kick the ball in order to get it out of traffic (in the past, kicking the ball resulted in an automatic relinquishing of possession to the other team). Also, players are allowed to self-start after an opposing player commits a minor foul against them. Before moving forward, one must stand still in an athletic stance before self-starting to let the referee know the player is ready to continue with game play.

In 2016, for the 2017 season, NCAA Division I implemented a 90-second possession shot clock, which was added to Divisions II and III in the following year.

In the summer of 2017, the NCAA added more major changes. Prior to the newest addition, all players needed to stop play upon whistle of the referee. Play was resumed upon another whistle or continuation by self-start. Free movement was implemented, meaning upon the whistle for a foul, play does not stop unless for halftime or the end of the game. Also, the defense is allowed to run through the crease of the lacrosse goal. For the draw, only 3 players, instead of 5 players, from each team are allowed into the midfield area until possession has been established. Last, a player must move out of the 8-meter arc after a penalty has been called.

In 2021 and 2022, there were further significant rule changes. The pre-game stick checks by referees were eliminated. In the past, players had their sticks checked by the referees to ensure they were within regulation. A player's stick instead will be checked after each goal scored by that player. Throughout the game, a team can request the referee to check an opposing player's stick. If the stick is illegal, the team requesting the stick check gains possession of the ball. If the stick is within regulation, the team requesting the check loses possession. If a team requests a check that affirms a legal stick for a second time, it loses a timeout. If a team has no timeouts remaining, it is not allowed to request a stick check. Another rule change eliminated the two 30-minute halves, instead implementing four 15-minute quarters with 2-minute breaks following the first and third quarters. The possession clock procedure has also changed in order to achieve fewer stoppages. When showing less than 60 seconds, the clock resets to 60 seconds if a team's offense regains possession of the ball after a goalie save or a shot that rebounds off of the goal.

In women’s lacrosse, the goalie circle: also known as the goal circle or crease, is the circular area surrounding the goal that protects the goalkeeper and provides space for her to defend the net. An attacking player or midfielder on the offensive team is generally prohibited from entering the circle or touching its boundary line while attempting to score. This restriction applies whether the player possesses the ball or moves into the circle without it. If an attacker illegally enters the circle, a goal-circle violation occurs which results in a turnover and possession is awarded to the opposing team. This rule prevents offensive players from interfering with the goalkeeper or gaining an unfair advantage near the goal. However, there is an important exception involving shots. An attacker may shoot from outside the goal circle and follow through with her stick over the boundary, provided her feet do not touch the line or enter the circle during the shooting motion. Under international women’s lacrosse rules, an attacker may enter the circle after the entire ball has crossed the goal line and all motion of her stick has ceased. The rules for defenders also vary by competition. At the NCAA collegiate level defenders may run through the goal circle in certain situations, while attacking players remain restricted behind. The goalkeeper is permitted to stay in the circle to defend the goal, and a designated field player known as a 'deputy' may enter under the specific circumstances, such as when the goalkeeper is outside of the circle and her team meets the applicable possession requirements. USA Lacrosse publishes separate youth girls lacrosse rules for different age groups including 6U, 8U, 10U, 12U, and 14U. These rules vary in areas such as checking, field dimensions, team size, and game time. For example, the 2026 youth rulebook permits modified checking at the 12U level and transitional checking at the 14U level. Full-field games at both levels include 12 players per team, including the goalkeeper. Games consist of four 10-minute quarters at 12U and four 12-minute quarters at 14U. Because regulations differ across youth, high school, collegiate, and, international competitions players must understand the rules specific to their level/age of play. Overall the goal-circle restrictions helps to protect the goalkeeper and maintain fair play.This ensures that scoring opportunities follow the rules of the game.

=== Players ===
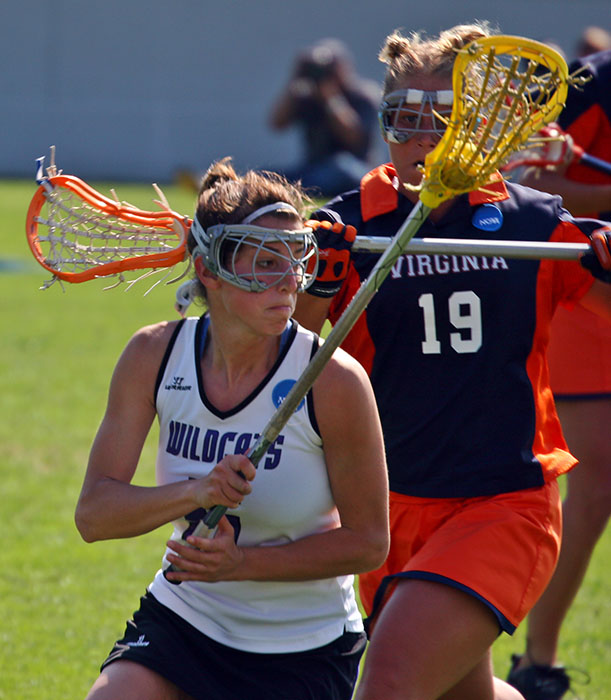
2005 NCAA Women's Lacrosse Championship in which the Virginia Cavaliers lost to the Northwestern Wildcats

Traditionally, women played with three attackers (starting with the position closest to the net that a team is shooting at, the attack positions are called "first home", "second home", and "third home"), five midfielders (a "right attack wing", a "left attack wing", a "right defensive wing", a "left defensive wing", and a "center"), three defenders (starting from the position closest to the net a team is defending, these positions are called "point", "cover point", and "third man"), and one goalie. The positions used to be pinned on the players, and the players used to be required to be marked on defense by their opposite number (third man or "3M" covering the opposing third home "3H").

Today, under North American rules, seven players play attack at one time and seven defenders are present. Generally, a team has four attackers, four close defenders, and three midfielders. There is a restraining line that keeps the four defensive players (plus the goalie) from going into the attack, or four attackers from going into the defensive zone. If those players cross the line and participate in the play, they are considered offside and a major foul is called.

=== Equipment ===
Women's lacrosse rules are specifically designed to limit physical contact between players. As a result of the lack of contact, the only protective equipment required are a mouth guard and face guard/goggles. Although headgear is not required (except for the U.S. state of Florida, where it is mandatory for girls lacrosse players), it is considered for lacrosse players due to the risk of head injury. In 2017 Brown University purchased headgear for its team and was the first NCAA program to make helmets available to the whole team.

Players must wear eye protection according to U.S. Lacrosse and England Lacrosse rules. All field players must properly wear eye protection that meets ASTM specification standard F803 for women's adult/ youth lacrosse for the appropriate level of play. Or if preferred (and mandatory in some states, including Florida) players wear helmets. All players must wear a professionally manufactured intra-oral mouthpiece that fully covers the teeth. The mouthguard must include portions protecting and separating the biting surfaces and protecting the teeth and supporting structures and has to cover the posterior teeth with adequate thickness. As of the 2024 spring season, mouthguards that are white, clear, or feature a design that is meant to imitate the appearance of teeth/fangs are permitted at all levels of play. Mouth pieces must be worn at all times and cannot be taken out in the middle of play. No protruding tabs are allowed for field players.

In addition, players may choose to wear gloves, and most jewelry is not allowed to be worn. There are exceptions to this, as hair ties and other soft/non-abrasive accessories on the arm are permitted, but earrings (unless the piercings are recent and covered by tape), rings, and necklaces are completely prohibited. Hair adornments like beads may be worn so long as they are secured and do not present a danger to the athlete or to others. Religious or cosmetic headwear is also permitted under the same conditions, any protective head coverings worn for medical reasons must be approved by the officials. Although the rules specify these types of protection, injuries still occur from accidental checks to the head and the overall nature of the sport.

Players must wear composition or rubber soled shoes. No spikes are allowed. Plastic, leather, or rubber cleats-studs may be worn. Shoes and socks are not required to be identical for team members.

The pockets of women's sticks are shallower than those of the men, making the ball more difficult to catch and to shoot at high speed. The pockets also make it harder to cradle without dropping the ball. The crosse of a women's stick may be 35.5 inches (902 mm) and no longer than 43.25 inches (1,099 mm) according to the NCAA girls lacrosse committee.

The crosse (lacrosse stick) is divided into two parts, the shaft and the head. The shaft can be made of a variety of materials such as wood, aluminum and composite materials depending on what position the player prefers. Women's lacrosse rules mandate that only composite and aluminum shafts can be used, due to accidental checks and hitting that can happen during the duration of the games. The top of the stick is where the head joins the shaft to make the whole stick. The head is made of compact plastic where the mesh, sidewall and pocket form.

There are different mesh types made from materials which affect the shot accuracy and handling of the ball. The sidewall is the siding of the head that affects the depth of the pocket and stiffness the feel when handling the ball. More stiff sidewalls and heads are better to use for defense players who want to check harder. More flexible sidewalls are better use of picking up groundballs, movement and face-offs. The pocket is made from mesh, and with these different meshes they can have different capabilities; a wide pocket allows and easier time catching balls, but will also cause less ball control, while a smaller head will allow the user a more hard time catching the ball but lends greater accuracy. The pocket of the lacrosse stick can often be easily adjusted to ensure the depth of the pocket is legal and meets the players preference before the start of a game.

The lacrosse ball is made of solid rubber and can be yellow, orange, blue or green. All lacrosse balls must meet NOCSAE (National Operating Committee on Standards for Athletic Equipment) standards.

=== Playing area ===
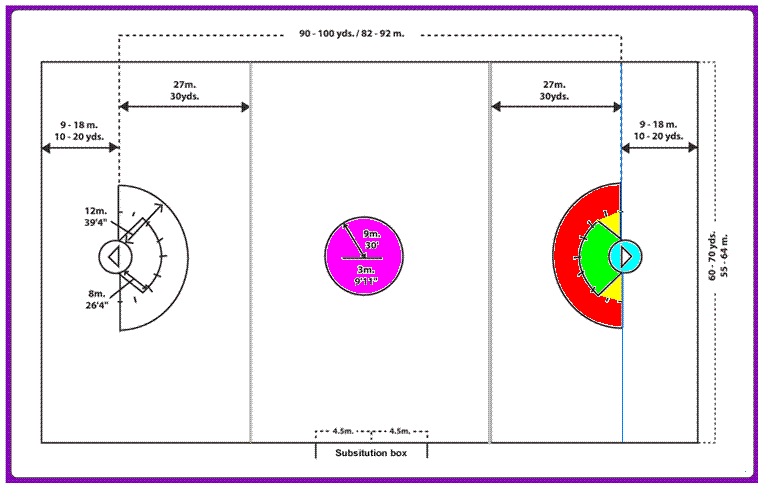
Women's lacrosse field dimensions based on 2007 IFWLA women's lacrosse rules

The size of the playing field depends on the players' age group. For U15 and U13 players, they must play on a regulation sized field with all appropriate markings. For U11, they must play on a regulation sized field with all appropriate markings whenever possible. Otherwise, they may play on a modified field with reduced players. For U9 players the fields must be rectangular, between 60 and 70 yards in length and 30–40 yards in width to accommodate play on existing fields.

Under World Lacrosse rules, there are two different areas around the goal on both sides of the field: the 3-meter goal circle around the goal (called the "crease") and the 11-meter arc. The players are never allowed to enter the crease on their attack side of the field. However, defenders are allowed to run through the crease while actively marking an attacker. Only the goalkeeper is allowed to remain stationary inside the crease. If a defensive foul occurs inside the 11-meter arc, all players that were previously inside the penalty area (defined as the area inside the 11-meter arc and the space within and between the restart dots that are behind the goal) must move to a location outside of the penalty area. The player who was fouled, must move to the nearest hash mark that is located around the edges of the arc and has a direct lane to goal. The defender who committed the foul is relocated 4 meters directly behind the shooter. If a player fouled another player not in the arc, the victim receives the ball and the player who fouled must back away at least 4 meters. All other players standing closer than 4 meters to the ball holder must also back away to give the player room to move with the ball. If outside the 11-meter arc, the offended player regains the ball and the person who committed the foul is relocated 4 meters behind the offender. Outside the 11-meter arc the game may be restarted by the offended player self-starting.

Under USA college rules, the two different areas around the goal on both sides of the field are the 8-meter arc and the 12-meter fan. When committing a major foul inside either of these areas, the offense regains the ball and has a direct opportunity to shoot at the goal. If outside the 8-meter arc, but inside the fan, a "lane" to goal is cleared of all other players and the person who committed the foul is relocated 4 meters behind the offender. If inside the 8-meter arc and a defensive foul occurs, all players that were previously inside the penalty area (defined as the area inside the 8-meter arc, the two pie shaped areas on either side of the arc, and the space within and between the restart dots that are behind the goal) must move to a location outside of the penalty area. The player who was fouled, now moves to the nearest hash mark that is located around the edges of the arc and has a direct lane to goal. The defender who committed the foul is relocated on the 12-meter fan directly behind the shooter. If a player fouled another player not in the arc, the victim receives the ball and the player who fouled must back away at least 4 meters. All other players standing closer than 4 meters to the ball holder must also back away to give the player room to move with the ball.

The shooting space rule in women's lacrosse is very important in keeping the players safe. It occurs when a defender moves into the offender's shooting lane to goal, while not marking an opponent at an angle that makes the defender at risk of being hit by the ball if the offender were to shoot. A shooting space violation calls for an immediate whistle by the umpire, granted that the attacking player with the ball would have the opportunity to shoot, and the attacker will be awarded a free position from the nearest hash mark on the 11-meter arc. Repeated shooting space violations may result in a yellow card.

=== Tie-breaking methods ===
Should a tie remain after regulation, the teams will then play 3-minute golden goal periods until one team scores, which wins the game.

=== Ball in and out of play ===
The "draw" is what starts the game and keeps the game going after a goal is scored. The draw is when two players, one from each team, stand in the center circle with the backs of their sticks facing each other. Then the referee places the ball between the two sticks. Each player has to push their sticks together parallel to the ground to contain the ball. There are allowed two players to stand along the circle surrounding the center circle during the draw. The players' sticks around the circle cannot break the line until the whistle is blown. The centers must lift and pull their sticks over their heads releasing the ball. If one player taking the draw moves or lifts their stick before the other player, it is penalized as an illegal draw.

Protecting one's stick from being checked is a very important key in the game of women's lacrosse. In order to protect the stick from being checked, the player must cradle the ball. If the player has a strong "cradle", it would make it much more difficult to recover the ball for the opposing team. "Cradling" is the back and forth movement and twisting of the head of the stick, which keeps the ball in the pocket with centripetal force.

Allowable checking is based on what age level of the game is being played. Rules for U15 and above allow lacrosse players full checking above the head. However, this requires that at least one of the two umpires have a USL Local Rating so that they can judge the appropriate amount of contact. In most cases, a check into the head area is a mandatory yellow card. If a sufficiently experienced umpire is not available, then U13 checking rules must be used where modified checking only below the shoulder is allowed. In U11 and U9 no checking is allowed. US Lacrosse rules recommend that Middle School/Junior High players play with U13 checking rules.

In women's lacrosse, players may only check if the check is directed away from the ball carrier's head. Also, players may only check using the side of their stick. If caught by one of the referees using the flat of the head, it will be called as a "held check" and the opposing team will get the ball.

There are two types of fouls in women's lacrosse, major and minor. When a minor foul is committed anywhere on the field, the player who committed the foul is set 4 meters to whichever side she was last guarding the person she obstructed. If a major foul occurs outside of the 12-meter fan or 8-meter arc, the fouler must stand 4 meters behind the player she fouled.

=== Penalties ===
Penalties for women's lacrosse are assessed with the following cards:

- The green card, given to the team, is often for a delay of game. A delay of game is issued when a player fails to move 4 meters as directed by the referee, engages too early, jewelry violation, and improper use of equipment, and includes any behavior that the official deems to be a delay of game. Green cards are also used to mitigate unnecessary fouling and dangerous play in transition. At the high school level, if a team is fouled three times in between the restraining lines, a green card will be awarded to the offending team, sending the last player to commit a foul to the penalty box. In NCAA rules, any foul committed within the restraining lines results in a green card. At both levels, a green card results in a one minute releasable penalty to the player, but at the NCAA level, if one team receives three green cards, the third and every subsequent green card will be unreleasable.
- The yellow card is for a major penalty deemed too dangerous/unnecessary for a typical whistle and free-position, and results in the player being removed from the field for two minutes. Certain fouls are mandatory yellow card violations, such as Dangerous Contact, Dangerous Follow-Through, Dangerous Propelling, Illegal Body Ball in the Goal Circle, Unsportsmanlike Conduct, Slashing, and Suspended Player Substitute, but any foul that the official deems too dangerous or excessive can be awarded a yellow card. Any player that receives two yellow cards in one game will be ejected from the play and will not be allowed to return to the game. At the high school level, yellow cards are unreleasable, whereas at the NCAA level, the first 3 yellow cards given to a single team in one game are releasable and every card after that point is "full time served". Yellow cards result in a two-minute man-down penalty for both levels. In high school play, any team that receives four yellow cards in a single game will have to play man-down for the rest of the game, and for every subsequent yellow card, will have to remove another player from the field.
- The red is the result of a particularly flagrant foul or extremely unsportsmanlike behavior, and causes the player to be ejected from the game. Once receiving a red card, the player is also not permitted to play in the following game. This penalty lasts for five minutes in the NCAA and lasts for four minutes in high school play, and is unreleasable under every rule set. In high school play, a red card also means that the recipient's team must play down a player for the rest of the game, regardless of how many yellow cards that team has been awarded during that game. Red cards also contribute to a team's "card count," which, if it reaches 4 cards in one game, the fourth and every subsequent card will require the removal of another player for the remainder of the game.

Penalties assessed include:

- Rough/Dangerous Check
- Check to the Head (Mandatory Card)
- Slash (Mandatory Card)
- Holding
- Check in the sphere
- Illegal cradle
- Blocking
- Charging
- Pushing
- Obstruction of the Free Space to Goal (Shooting Space)
- Illegal Pick
- Tripping
- Detaining
- Forcing Through
- False Start
- Dangerous Propelling (Mandatory Card)
- Dangerous Follow-Through (Mandatory Card)
- Dangerous Shot
- Illegal Shot
- Covering
- Empty Stick Check
- Warding off
- Illegal Body Ball
- Squeezing the Head of the Crosse
- Throwing her crosse in any circumstance.
- Taking part in the game if she is not holding her crosse.
- Illegal Draw
- Early entry on draw
- Illegal crosse
- Scoring a goal with a crosse that does not meet the field crosse specifications.
- Adjusting the strings/thongs of her crosse after an official inspection of her crosse has been requested during the game. The crosse must be removed.
- Jewelry
- Illegal Uniform
- Illegal Substitution
- Delay of game
- Play from out of bounds
- Illegal re-entry
- Illegal Timeout

== International competition ==
Beginning in 1972, the sport was governed internationally by the International Federation of Women's Lacrosse Associations (IFWLA). The formation of the IFWLA actually predated that of the corresponding body for men's lacrosse, the International Lacrosse Federation (ILF), by two years.

In August 2008, after negotiations lasting four years, the IFWLA and ILF agreed to merge into a single governing body, the Federation of International Lacrosse (FIL). All tournaments operated by the IFWLA were taken over by the FIL. The FIL changed its name to World Lacrosse in 2019.

The World Lacrosse Women's World Championship, formerly the Women's Lacrosse World Cup, is held every four years. It was organized by the IFWLA before its merger with the IFL and is now organized by World Lacrosse. The 2022 edition was hosted by the United States in Towson, Maryland, where the United States defeated Canada in the final. Only two countries have ever won the world championship — Australia (two times) and the United States (nine times). Canada and England have both reached the final, but neither country lifted the trophy.

== Defunct Leagues ==
- Athletes Unlimited Lacrosse - A four team league which played from 2021 to 2024.
- Women's Professional Lacrosse League - Was a four team league which was started in 2018, but ceased operations in 2020.
- United Women's Lacrosse League - Was a four team league founded in 2015, but ceased operations in 2018.
