= Millard Lang =

American soccer and lacrosse player (1912–2002)

Personal information
- Full name: Millard T. Lang
- Date of birth: August 7, 1912
- Place of birth: Baltimore, Maryland, United States
- Date of death: August 4, 2002 (aged 89)
- Place of death: Baltimore, Maryland, United States
- Height: 5 ft 10 in (1.78 m)
- Position: Forward

Senior career*
Years	Team	Apps	(Gls)
1934–1936	Baltimore Canton		
1936–1937	Cleveland Graphite Bronze		
1937–1940	Chicago Sparta		
1940–1941	Chicago Eagles		
1941–1942	Chicago Sparta		
1942–	Baltimore Americans		

Managerial career
- 1944–1945: Baltimore Americans
- * Club domestic league appearances and goals

Millard T. Lang (August 7, 1912 – August 4, 2002) was an American soccer forward and lacrosse player who is a member of both the National Soccer Hall of Fame and the National Lacrosse Hall of Fame.

== Youth and college ==
Lang began playing soccer for a team in the Baltimore Police Athletic League when he was thirteen. Lang attended high school at Baltimore Polytechnic Institute where he had an exceptional athletic record. He lettered in five sports: soccer, lacrosse, basketball, football and tennis. He also ran track. He was captain of his school's soccer team, which won two city prep championships under his leadership. After graduating from high school in 1930, he entered Johns Hopkins University playing football and lacrosse. He was a four-time lacrosse All American, three times as First Team. Each of these awards was for a separate position, third defense, second attack and out home, showing Lang's breadth of ability in that sport. From 1932 to 1934, Johns Hopkins ran to three undefeated seasons and three consecutive national championships. In 1932, the Johns Hopkins lacrosse team was selected to represent the United States at the 1932 Summer Olympics. Lacrosse was an exhibition sport at those games, and the U.S. defeated Canada in two games of the three games played.

== Professional ==
Lang graduated from Johns Hopkins in 1934, having earned a bachelor's degree in engineering. Following his graduation, he began his professional soccer career with the expansion Baltimore Canton of the American Soccer League. At the time, soccer in the United States rarely paid well enough to provide a livable income. Consequently, he worked for Westinghouse Electric Company as a marketing representative. Over the years, he would work in Baltimore, Cleveland and Chicago, joining teams in those cities as his job with Westinghouse moved him. In his first season in the league, Lang led the league in scoring with fourteen goals. In 1936, Westinghouse transferred Lang to Cleveland, Ohio. When he arrived, he joined Cleveland Graphite Bronze, but moved to Chicago in 1937 where he signed with Chicago Sparta of the National Soccer League of Chicago. Lang and his teammates won the 1938 NSL championship, 1938-1939 St. Louis Soccer League title and the 1939 Peel Cup. Sparta won the 1940 National Challenge Cup, but Lang did not play in the championship game. That summer, he moved to Chicago Eagles, but returned to Sparta in 1941 until he returned to Baltimore in 1942 where he rejoined the Baltimore Canton which had just renamed themselves the Baltimore Americans. He spent an unknown number of seasons with the Americans, but finished tenth in the league in scoring during the 1943–1944 season with ten goals in thirteen games. That season the Americans also won the league title.

== Coach and executive ==
Lang coached the Baltimore Americans during the 1944–1945 season. He later served in numerous executive positions at both the team and league levels. He was the president of the Maryland and D.C. State Association and in 1954, became the general manager and co-owner of the Baltimore Rockets.

Lang was inducted into the National Soccer Hall of Fame in 1950, the National Lacrosse Hall of Fame in 1978, the Maryland Soccer Hall of Fame in 1983, and the Johns Hopkins Athletic Hall of Fame in 1995. In December 1999, Sports Illustrated ranked him 44th on a list of 50 all-time great Maryland athletes.
