= Lacrosse stick =

Stick used to play the sport of lacrosse

A lacrosse stick or crosse is used to play the sport of lacrosse. Players use the lacrosse stick to handle the ball and to strike or "check" opposing players' sticks, causing them to drop the ball. The head of a lacrosse stick is roughly triangular in shape and is strung with loose netting that allows the ball to be caught, carried (known as "cradling"), passed, or shot.

== History of lacrosse sticks ==
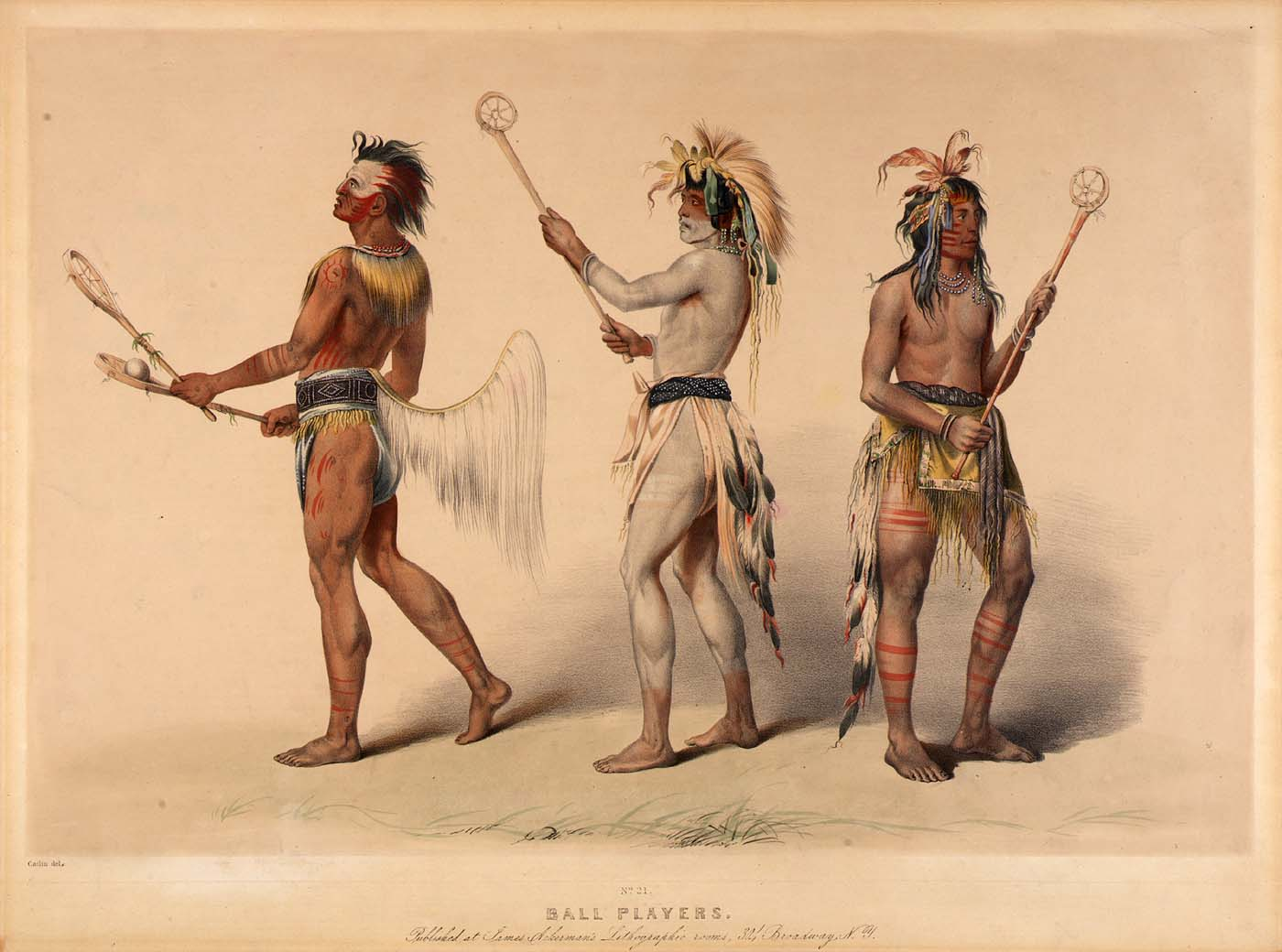
"Ball players", a hand-colored lithograph by George Catlin.

=== Indigenous stick history and variations ===
Modern day lacrosse descends from and resembles games played by various Native American communities. Many of those games closely resemble what is now known as stickball.

Many early stickball sticks were essentially giant wooden spoons with no netting. More advanced sticks featured one end being bent into a 4 to 5-inch diameter circle. This circle would have netting made of wattup, and later on deer sinew. The tension in the netting of the stick allowed for players to strike the ball as someone would do in tennis. These sticks were typically 1 to 10 feet long and were bent into shape after being softened with water. This variation was played by many Great Lakes tribes.

The modern one-stick version of lacrosse is most closely modeled after the Iroquois. The sticks used by the Iroquois featured a U-shaped head rather than a circular one closely resembled the wooden sticks used today.

==== Traditions and decorations ====
Lacrosse sticks were often very treasured by their users. Players received a stick when they were born and were buried with their stick when they died. The practice still exists today to some degree, but Native Americans are not to be presented with or buried with a plastic modern lacrosse stick.

Many stickball players decorated their sticks with the hair of animals like horses or raccoons, hoping to match that animal's speed and agility.

During grand matches or special events some players would decorate their sticks with feathers or dye their sticks different colors as a form of customization.

Some sticks would have elaborate carvings on them for spiritual reasons.

=== Early production of lacrosse sticks (1880s–1968) ===
Sometime between 1884 and 1893, Frank Lally started the first lacrosse stick factory. He hired various native stickmakers to facilitate the assembly line style process. This company would close during World War Two and sold their equipment to the Chilsholm Lacrosse Manufacturing Company. During the great depression Colin Chisholm, and the Roundpoint brothers (who had worked in the Lally factory previously) started a competing lacrosse manufacturing company known as the Chisholm Lacrosse Manufacturing Company. This company operated on Cornwall Island, part of the Akwesasne Mohawk reserve, and had dozens of Mohawk stick makers working for it. At one point the Chisholm factory was believed to be producing as much as 97-percent of the worlds lacrosse sticks. They also supplied college teams and major lacrosse companies such as Brine with sticks. In 1968, the Chisholm factory burnt down. The ensuing shortage of lacrosse sticks likely sped up the transition to plastic lacrosse sticks.

In 1937, Robert Pool designed the first double walled stick head, it was not used at the time but the design influenced the creation of today's plastic lacrosse heads.

=== Production of the modern lacrosse stick ===
==== Pre-1970 ====
Throughout the 1950s and 1960s companies such as Brine and STX began experimenting with different materials to develop lacrosse sticks. The Brine company was founded in early 1920s and had developed other wooden sticks. It also experimented with materials such as laminated wood, fibreglass, plastic, and aluminum. STX was founded in the 1960s in Baltimore by lacrosse players working for WT Burnett, a plastics company. They were experimenting with various lighter synthetic materials. Brine settled on a Dupont plastic called "Surlyn", while STX settled on Dupont "Adiprene" urethane rubber.

==== 1970s ====
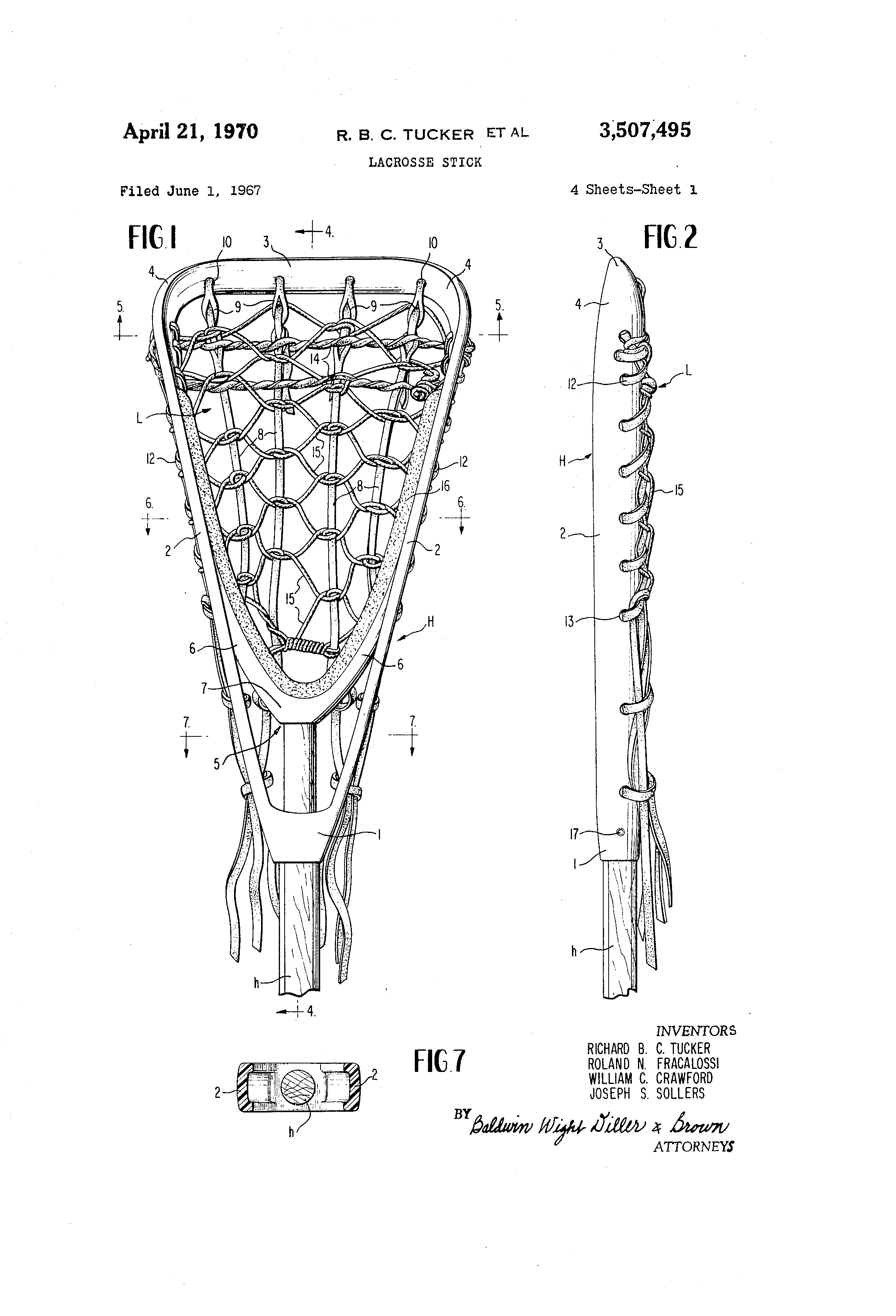
Patent drawing for the first plastic lacrosse head by STX published in 1970

On April 21, 1970, STX was issued the patent for the first plastic head. The head was placed onto a wooden shaft. Since the stick was symmetrical in shape, it could be used by both left-handed and right-handed individuals, as opposed to traditional sticks which had different designs depending on handedness. The stick was triangular in shape and did not feature the "pinched" sidewalls, where the stick remains narrow throughout the bottom and middle of the head and widens near the top, we now see on modern lacrosse sticks. These sticks were also what is now referred to as "non-offset" or "onset". Offset lacrosse heads would be introduced in the mid-1990s and is extremely common on newer lacrosse heads.

Early lacrosse sticks were extremely basic with little complexity in selecting equipment. Players essentially only needed to select the brand of stick they wanted, and from their selected the stick that brand offered for their position.

On July 2, 1974, the patent was granted to STX for pocket mesh. By the 1980s, mesh had largely replaced traditional mesh as the preferred stick stringing method.

==== 1980s ====
In the early 1980s, the first aluminum shafts were developed. The hollow aluminum shafts were lighter than wood and thus led to significantly faster stick movement, shots, and passes.

In the 1981 Brine released the Brine "Magnum" which was an early attempt at a pinched head. In the late-1980s, Brine released the Brine "Shotgun" and the "Shotgun II" which further developed the pinched head idea.

==== 1990s ====
===== The offset head =====
On August 18, 1995, Brine filed the patent for the "scooped" head which featured what we now know as offset. As shown in the original patent, offset is when sidewall curves in order to form a scoop-like shape.

On December 5, 1995, Brine filed the patent for the Brine "Edge", it would be the first head to feature an offset design and it quickly began to dominate the playing space. The patent for the offset in the Brine Edge was slightly different than original offset patent, it featured sidewalls that extended from a lower point of the base rather than simply curving from the top of the base.

The creation of offset technology was revolutionary technology for lacrosse heads, it allowed for the ball to sit lower on the axis of the shaft which increased control and feel for the ball. Within a few years offset sticks became the norm. STX responded to the issue of offset heads by creating their own similar technology known as "Forward Cant". STX created both shafts and heads with forward cant. The shafts with forward cant would face no issues, the heads however, were similar to Brines offset technology and would face legal issues.

In 1999, Brine filed a patent infringement against STX for their three offset (or forward cant) heads: the "X2", the "Proton", and the "Octane". After trial, it was ruled that STX had willingly infringed on the patent of the Brine Edge and awarded damages in favor of Brine. STX was also barred from selling their three offset heads, however the X2 and the Proton would later go on to have other variations made.

== Traditional stick ==
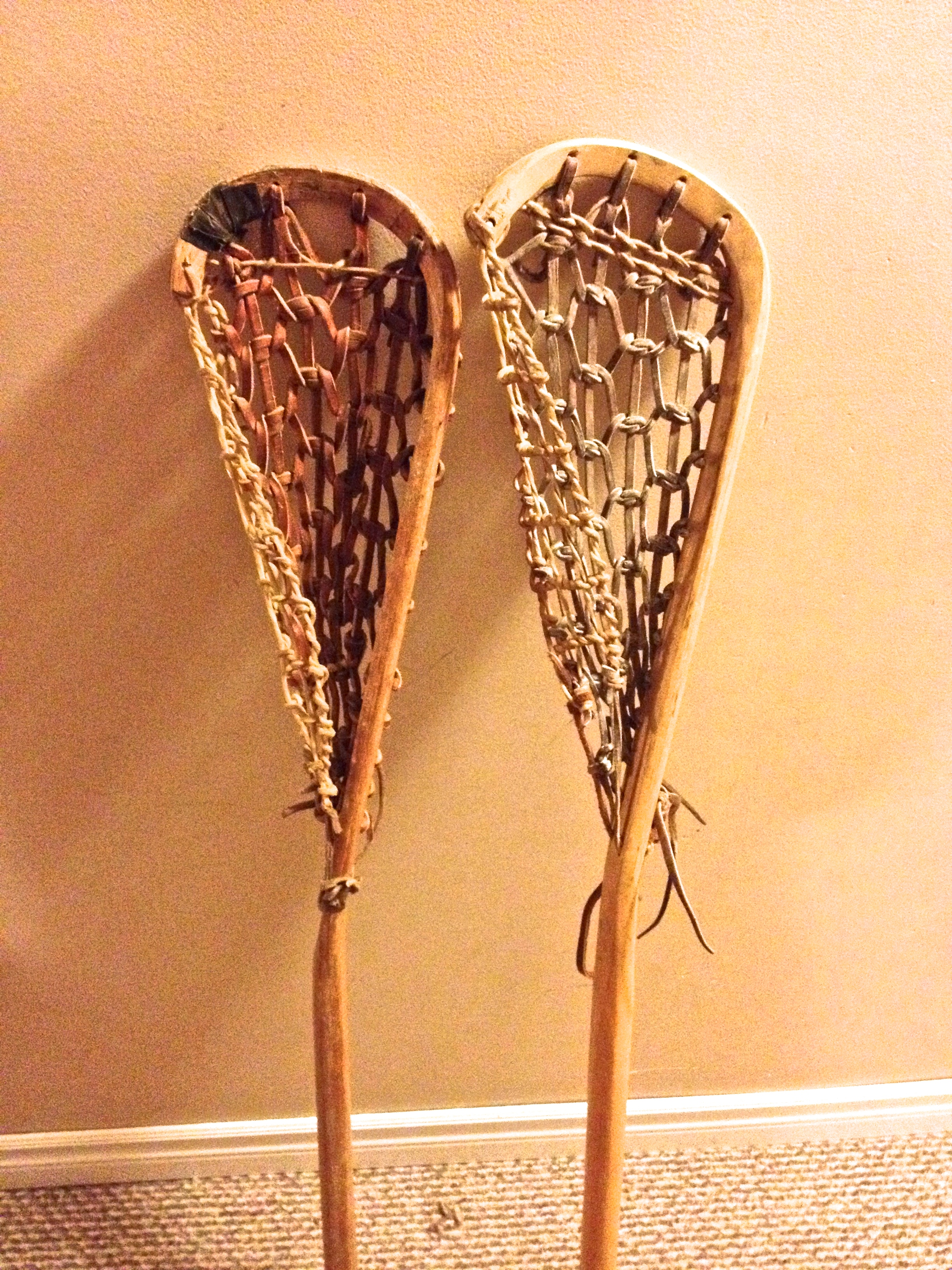
A pair of wood lacrosse sticks.

A wood lacrosse stick is usually crafted from hickory trees. The lacrosse stick is given its shape through steam bending. Holes are drilled in the top portion of the head and the sidewall (i.e., the side of the stick head), permitting weaving of string, which is then hardened by dipping them in resin. Leather "runners" are strung from the top of the "head" to the "throat" of the stick. Then nylon string is woven in to create the pocket.

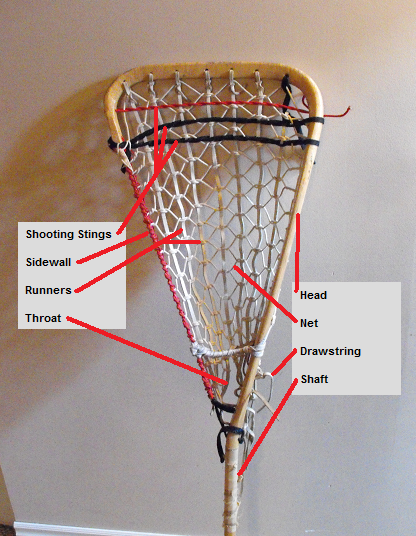
Diagram of Mitchell Brothers wooden lacrosse goalie stick.

The wooden lacrosse stick dates back to the creation of the sport and is still made by craftsmen around the world. Though modern lacrosse sticks made of plastic have become the overwhelming choice for contemporary lacrosse players, traditional wooden lacrosse sticks are still commonly used by box lacrosse goaltenders, senior and masters players, and by women's field lacrosse players. Wooden sticks are still legal under Canadian Lacrosse Association, NCAA, and World Lacrosse rules but are subject to the same size regulations as modern lacrosse sticks. The only exception to this is the Western Lacrosse Association, which prohibited the use of wooden sticks by non-goaltenders some years ago. The last WLA player to use one was A.J. Smith of the Coquitlam Adanacs, c. 2003–04, who had been grandfathered.

== Men's modern stick ==
=== Head ===
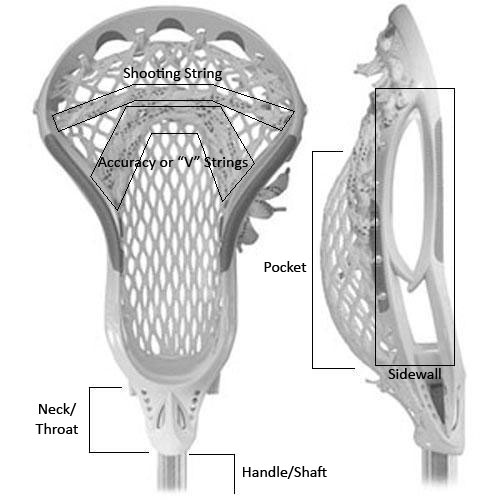
Diagram of a Men's Lacrosse Stick Head

In 1970, the first patent (US Patent #3,507,495) for a synthetic lacrosse stick was issued to STX. A modern lacrosse stick consists of a plastic molded head attached to a metal or composite shaft. The head is strung with nylon or leather strings to form a pocket. The dimensions of the stick (length, width, sidewall height, and depth of the pocket) are governed by league rules, such as NCAA rules for collegiate players or World Lacrosse rules for international players.

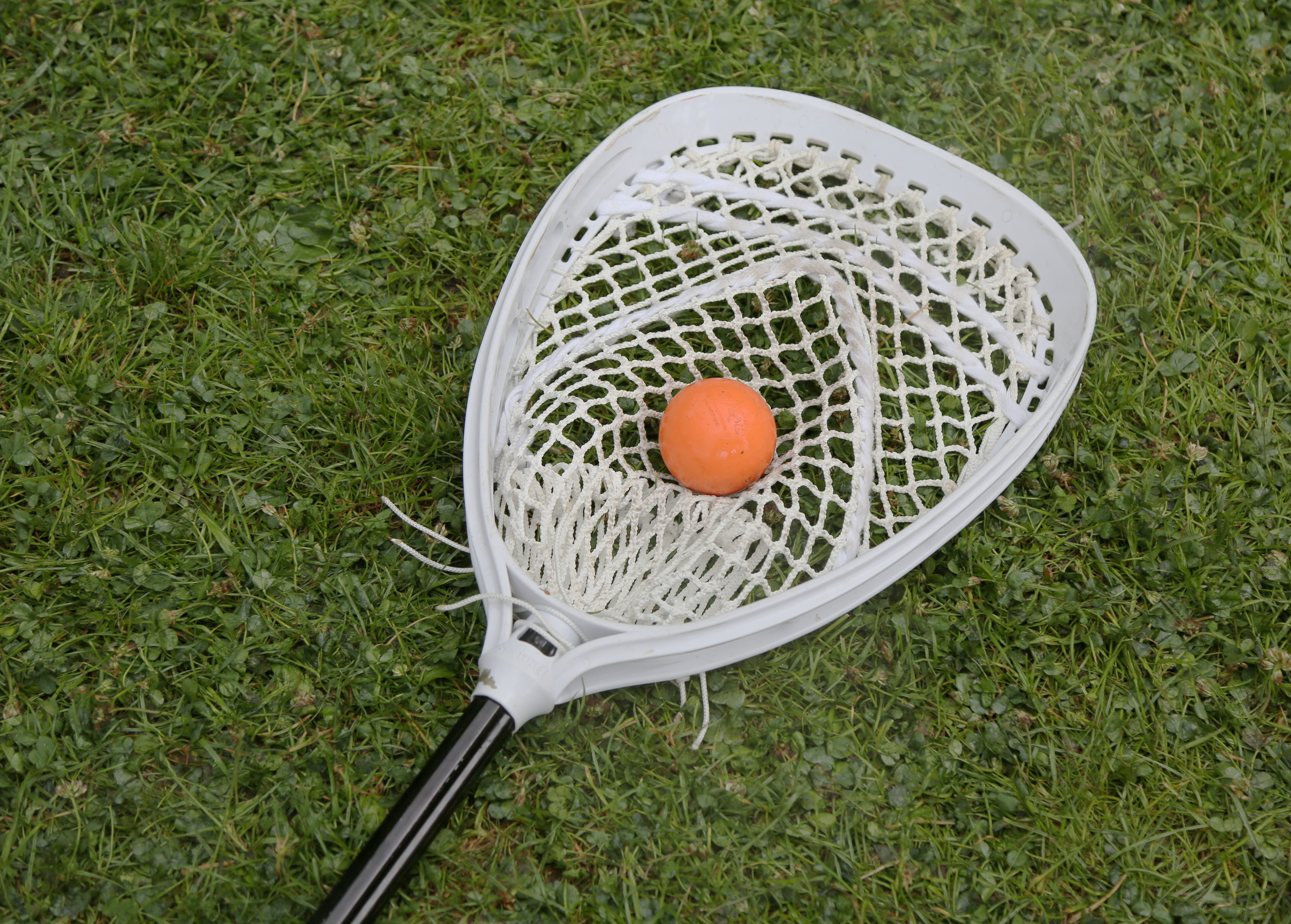
Field goalie's stick.

For field players in men's lacrosse, the head of the stick must be 6 to 10 inches (15 to 25 cm) wide at its widest point under NCAA rules. In order to prevent the ball from being stuck in the crosse, the two sidewalls cannot be any closer than 3 inches at any point between 1.25 inches from the throat of the head, to 5 inches from the throat of the head. When it reaches 5 inches from the throat of the head, the sidewalls may be between 3.5 inches apart and 4 inches apart on the front of the head, and must be 3.5 inches apart on the back of the head. The head of the stick must also be a minimum of 10 inches in length; length is measured from the outside of the head to the beginning of the throat.

The head of the goalie's stick is much larger and must be between 10 and 12 inches wide under NCAA rules or up to 15 inches (38 cm) wide under World Lacrosse rules. A goalie head may not exceed 16.5 inches in length.

The sidewalls of the head may not be more than two inches (5.1 cm) tall for all sticks.

The flat table test states that, when laid flat on a table facedown, the furthest point from the tabletop cannot exceed 2.75 inches.

=== Pocket ===
The pocket of the head is where the ball is carried and caught. It consists of interwoven string attached to the head. Traditional stringing with leather strings interwoven with nylon has declined in popularity in favor of synthetic mesh stringing. Mesh is typically made of nylon and comes in a variety of diamond configurations, which can affect the pocket's throwing and retention characteristics.

The typical mesh pocket uses four main nylon strings to affix the mesh piece to the head: a topstring, two sidewalls, and a bottom string. The topstring is often made of a slightly thicker string, in order to resist the abrasive forces that come from scooping the ball up. The sidewalls are used to affix individual mesh diamonds to the sidewall holes on the sidewall of the head. The sidewalls have the most effect on the pocket's performance, as they dictate the placement of the pocket in the head, the tightness of the channel of the pocket, and even the pocket depth. The bottom string is used to fine-tune the pocket depth, and serves to keep the ball from slipping through the bottom of the pocket.

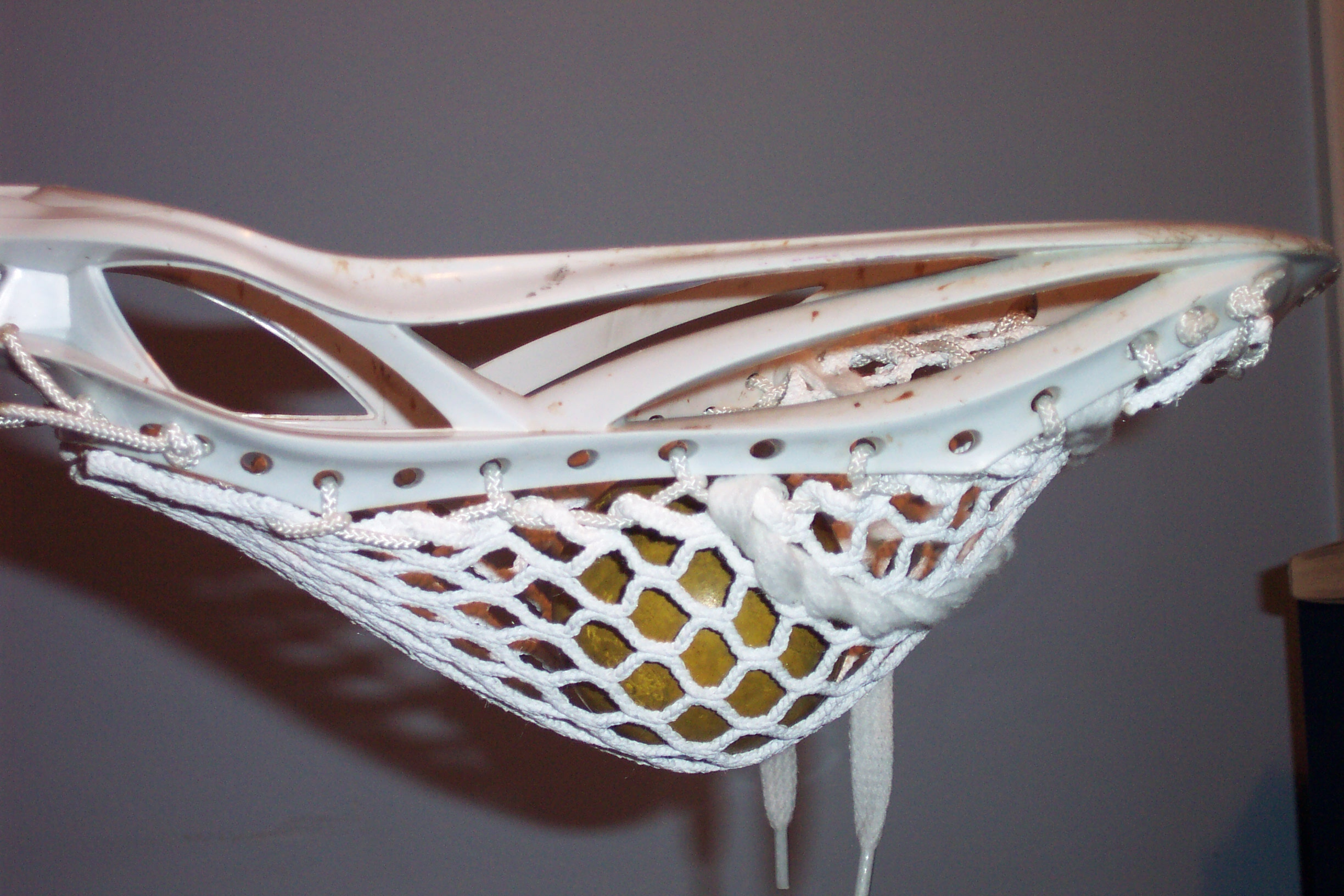
A legal men's pocket where the top of the ball is above the bottom of the stick's sidewall.

In addition to the four strings used to affix the mesh piece, shooting strings are woven through the diamonds of the mesh in order to help fine-tune the pocket's characteristics. They can either be made of typical nylon string, or a hockey style lace. Shooting strings are often used in straight, U, or V shapes. They serve to increase the pocket's hold on the ball, as well as fine-tune the way the stick throws. They can act to change the tension of various portions of the pocket, helping to create a "ramp" for the ball to roll along as it exits the pocket.

As of the 2013 season, the NCAA has passed a rule stating that shooting strings are limited to an area within a 4-inch (10 cm) arc drawn from the top of the plastic of the scoop. This essentially eliminates U- or V-shaped shooting strings, as they almost always cross below the 4-inch (10 cm) line. The pocket depth is governed by rule as well. When the ball is placed in the deepest point, the top of the ball must not be below the bottom of the sidewall. This rule does not apply to the goalie's stick. In professional box lacrosse, pocket depth regulations differ from those used in field lacrosse. Under National Lacrosse League (NLL) rules, the pocket of a runner's stick may not exceed 5 inches (12.7 cm) in depth, measured from the bottom of the head's sidewall.

=== Shaft ===
Three offensive-player length shafts for men's lacrosse

Modern handles, more commonly referred to as "shafts", are made of hollow metal. They are usually octagonal, instead of round, in order to provide a better grip. Most are made of aluminum, titanium, scandium, or alloy, but some shafts are still made from other materials, including wood, plastic, or fiberglass. The open end of the hollow shaft must be covered with tape or a plug (commonly referred to as the "butt" or "butt end" of the stick), usually made of rubber. The head of the stick is usually attached to the shaft with a screw to keep it in place.

Stick length is governed by NCAA regulations, which require that men's sticks (including the head) be from 40 to 42 inches (100 to 110 centimetres) long for offensive players, 52 to 72 inches (130 to 180 centimetres) long for defensemen, and 40 to 72 inches (100 to 180 centimetres) long for goalies. Offensive players usually prefer their sticks to be the minimum length (40 in or 100 cm) in order to give them the advantage of having a shorter stick to protect from defensive checks. Conversely, defensive players usually prefer their sticks to be the maximum length (72 in or 180 cm) to permit them the greatest range in covering their offensive player.

In 2016, a rules clarification was made by the NCAA Men's Lacrosse Rules Committee. Questions have arisen regarding the alteration of the shaft circumference. The circumference of the shaft cannot exceed 3 1/2 inches (8.9 cm). To be clear, added tape to the shaft must not make the shaft exceed this circumference measurement.

== Women's modern stick ==
This section uses the World Lacrosse official women's field lacrosse rule book. There may be differences in exact measurements throughout different levels of play.

=== Head ===
NCAA rules dictate that the head of a woman's stick may be from seven to nine inches wide at its widest point. World Lacrosse rules require the widest point of the head to be a minimum of 16 centimeters or roughly 6.3 inches for plastic heads. The inside width of the stick must continually increase from the ball stop to the widest point of the head.

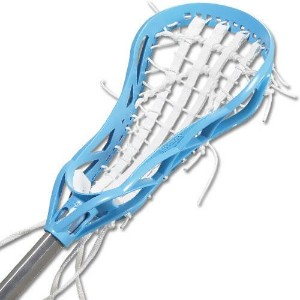
stick head

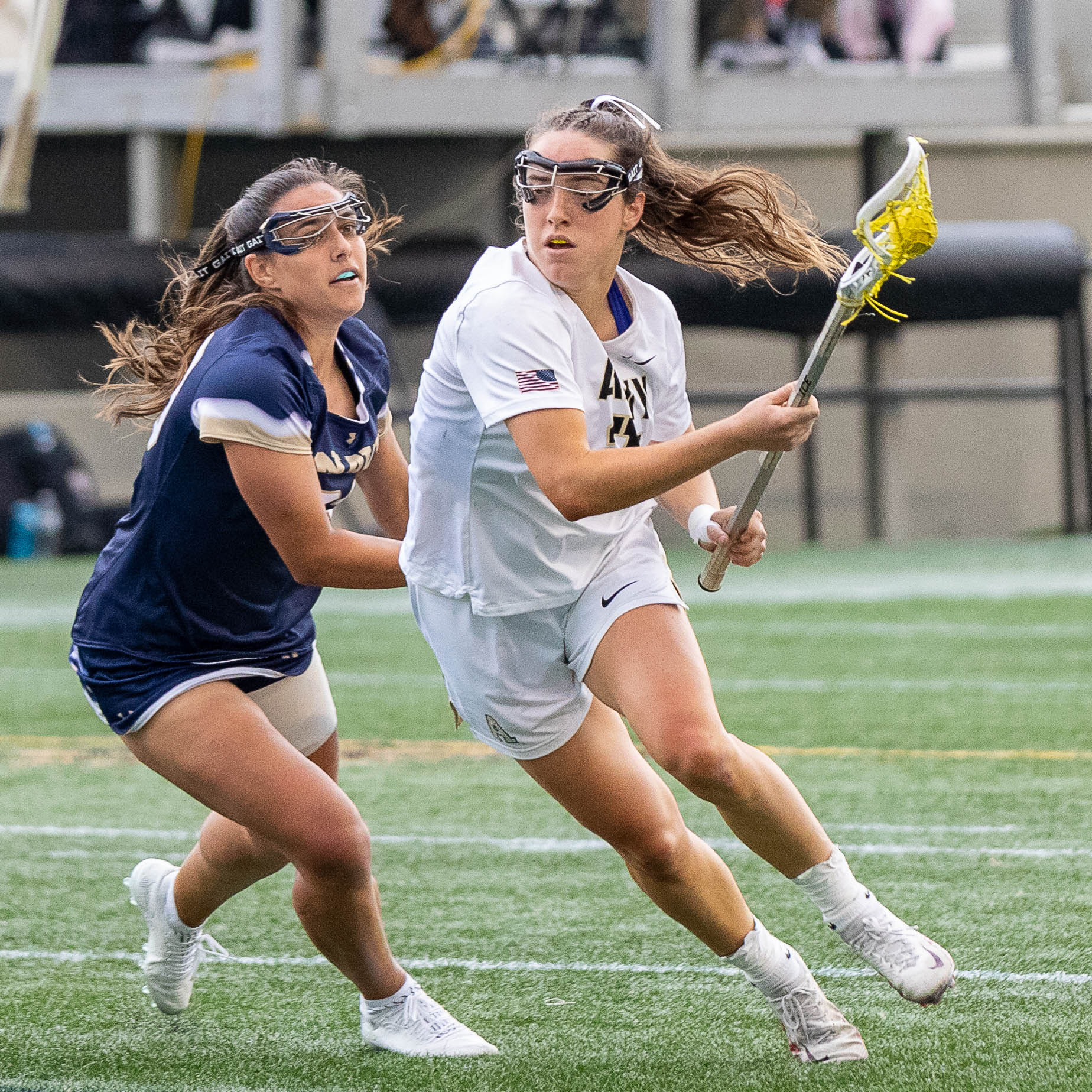
womens lacrosse

Goalie sticks have a maximum length of 42 centimetres (17 inches). The sidewall height must be a minimum of 2.54 centimetres (1.00 inch) and a maximum of 5.1 centimetres (2.0 inches).

=== Pocket ===
Up until 2018, nylon mesh was not permitted in women's sticks, although traditional stringing remains a popular option. When strung traditionally, the pocket is allowed to have between two and five runners, and between eight and twelve stitches of cross-lacing. Each runner must run the full length of the head. The stringing of the stick must be attached to the bottom of the sidewall as opposed to the top.

Women's lacrosse sticks are permitted to have two shooting strings. The top shooting string must be attached to the top-third of the head. Unlike in men's lacrosse, the bottom shooting string may be in an "inverted U" shape so long as the shooting string connects to the side wall in the top-half of the head.

There is a wide variety of pocket types. Some of the post popular include mesh pockets, mesh runners, traditional pockets, leather pockets, etc. You can also buy specific pocket pieces to customize your pocket. There are many options for stringing to create the best custom pocket to optimize performance in your position.

The legal depth of a women's stick pocket is determined by the following test: the top of the lacrosse ball, when placed in the pocket, must remain above the top edge of the sidewall.

The rules for stringing a goalie stick differ from a field players stick. When a goalie stick is strung traditionally, they are required to have 6 or 7 runners, while also using eight to twelve stitches of cross-lacing. A goalie has no restrictions for the placement or design of shooter strings so long as the ball can move freely in the stick. A goalie stick may have unlimited pocket depth so long as the ball can move freely.

=== Shaft ===
Women's sticks are allowed to be 35.5 to 43.25 inches (90.2 to 109.9 centimetres) long. Goalies may play with a shaft that is 90 to 135 centimeters (35 to 53 inches) long. Players under the age of 15 are allowed to use sticks shorter than 90 centimeters so that play can be more comfortable. Shafts may be constructed of wood, metal-alloy, or another composite material.The most popular material of shafts is carbon fiber/composite, (this is the lightest option). Which is preferred by most experienced players for quick stick work. Metal alloys like aluminum, titanium, or scandium (durable, traditional feel). Which are usually best for beginners and defenders that prefer the durability and weight of metal alloys.

=== Popular Stick Brands ===
Top women's lacrosse stick brands include Gait, ECD, STX, Nike, Maverick, and StringKing.

== Intercrosse ==
In intercrosse the stick consists of a basket, a guard and a handle. The basket is maded of moulded plastic and the handle of fibreglass, metal or wood. The weight will be between 280 grams and 380 grams.
