= STX (sports manufacturer) =

Sports equipment manufacturer

STX, LLC
- Company type: Subsidiary
- Industry: Sports equipment
- Founded: 1970; 56 years ago as STX Inc.
- Founder: Richard B.C. Tucker Sr.
- Headquarters: Baltimore, Maryland, United States
- Key people: Richard B.C. Tucker Sr. (Chairman, Founder and co-creator of first stick); Richard B.C. Tucker Jr. (CEO); Jason Goger (President)
- Products: Sports equipment, Apparel: Lacrosse Equipment: sticks, helmets, protective goggles, gloves, goalie masks; Field Hockey Equipment: sticks, protective goggles, balls, shin guards; Ice Hockey Equipment: sticks, gloves
- Parent: Wm. T. Burnett & Co.
- Website: STX.com

STX (a contraction of the word "sticks" but commonly called "S-T-X") is a global sports equipment manufacturer based in Baltimore, Maryland, US. STX makes lacrosse equipment, field hockey equipment, and ice hockey equipment, but its main business is in manufacturing of men's and women's lacrosse sticks and protective gear, including gloves, pads, and women's eyewear.

The company was founded in 1970 by Richard B.C. Tucker, Sr. as STX Inc. STX's first stick was the double wall, synthetic lacrosse head (U.S. Pat. #3,507,495), which was the first synthetic stick and the only type used to score goals in the first NCAA Men's Lacrosse Championship (1971).

STX is one of the largest manufacturers of lacrosse equipment, and in Maryland, part of the $66+ million industry. It is a subsidiary of Wm. T. Burnett & Co.

== Early history ==
Richard B.J. Tucker Sr. grew up playing lacrosse in Baltimore and member of the Johns Hopkins men’s lacrosse team, earning All-American status in his senior year. Upon graduating from Hopkins in 1951, Tucker joined the family business, Wm. T Burnett & Co.

At Burnett, Tucker and his fellow lacrosse playing colleagues began to play with the notion of a synthetic lacrosse head that would make the game they were all so passionate about more accessible to the masses. Up until and through the 1960s, all lacrosse sticks were laboriously crafted and strung by hand on the Native American reservations where the game had been played for centuries. The very limited supply and relatively high level of inconsistency in the final product made for a relatively exclusive distribution network. In the case of Mr. Tucker, the situation was compounded by the fact that the vast majority of sticks were built and strung in such a manner that they were truly most conducive for right handed players. Being left handed, Tucker grew frustrated that if he broke a stick, finding a quality replacement was exponentially more difficult for him than it was for others.

With a desire to improve and grow the game they cherished, and access to the latest in raw material technology, Tucker and his partners began experimenting with various fabrications for a synthetic lacrosse head. By 1966, Joseph Sollers Jr. (President of Burnett and former Hopkins Lacrosse All-American), Bill Crawford (former University of Virginia goaltender), and Roland Fracalossi (industry leading chemist at Burnett) had, along with Tucker, produced the first synthetic lacrosse head. A patent application was filed in 1967, while a refined prototype was developed over the next year. In 1968, during a game between the US Naval Academy and West Point, a synthetic lacrosse head was put into play for the first time.

In 1970, US Patent #3,507,495 was received by STX, LLC. One year later, in the first NCAA lacrosse national championship, Cornell outscored Maryland 12-6 for the win. Every single goal scored during the match was done so with an STX lacrosse head, a dramatic shift from just 12 months prior when wooden sticks were the standard. The new, synthetic type of stick has become the most common in the sport.

== Golf ==
In the mid-1970s, STX began branching out from lacrosse equipment with the development of golf putters, aided by ties with the chemical company DuPont. In 2006, a survey conducted by the Darrell Survey Company on the PGA Tour determined that STX putters were considered among the top five. As of 2021, STX no longer sells golf clubs.

== Ice hockey ==
STX produces ice hockey equipment, including shoulder pads, elbow pads, gloves, shin guards, and sticks. They have three lines of equipment: Stallion, Surgeon, and Halo. There are several NHL players who use STX gear, including Jiří Hudler, Matt Moulson, Vincent Trocheck, Ivan Barbashev, and Brandon Pirri.
