= Lacrosse at the 1932 Summer Olympics =

Men's lacrosse at the Games of the X Olympiad
- Venue: Los Angeles Memorial Coliseum
- Date: August 7–12
- Competitors: 38 from 2 nations

Lacrosse was a demonstration sport at the 1932 Summer Olympics in Los Angeles. Teams from Canada and the United States played three games, with the team from the United States winning the series 2 games to 1. Games were played in the new Los Angeles Memorial Coliseum in front of large crowds.

Canada was represented by an all-star team, while the United States was represented by the Johns Hopkins lacrosse team, coached by Ray Van Orman.

The first game on Sunday, August 7 was played on the same day as the marathon, which finished in the Coliseum. The United States won 5-3 in front of 75,000 people. Canada won the second game 5-4 with a last second goal. The deciding game was won by the United States 7-4.

== Results ==
Team	GP	W	L
United States	3	2	1
Canada	3	1	2

August 7	United States	5:3	Canada
August 9	Canada	5:4	United States
August 12	United States	7:4	Canada

== Teams ==
=== Canada ===
- Henry Baker
- Joseph Bergin
- Richard Buckingham
- Kenneth Calbeck
- W. Fraser
- J. Frasir
- Norman Gair
- Stuart Gifford
- William Harrison
- F. A. Hawkins
- Rowland Mercer
- Bernard McEvoy
- John McQuarrie
- Yvan Paquin
- Anthony Pelletier
- Matthew Rohmer
- Norman Russell
- Bryce Spring
- H. D. Wallace
- J. A. Worthy

=== United States ===
- Francis Beeler
- Walter Kneip, Jr.
- Douglas Stone
- Joseph Darrell
- Millard Lang
- Fritz Stude
- Lorne Guild
- Marshall McDorman
- James W. Ives
- James Merriken
- Caleb Kelly
- George Packard
- Donaldson Kelly
- Peter W. Reynolds
- William Triplett
- Jack Turnbull
- Church Yearley
- William Weitzel

== See also ==
- Federation of International Lacrosse
- World Lacrosse Championship
