= Lacrosse ball =

Rubber ball used for lacrosse

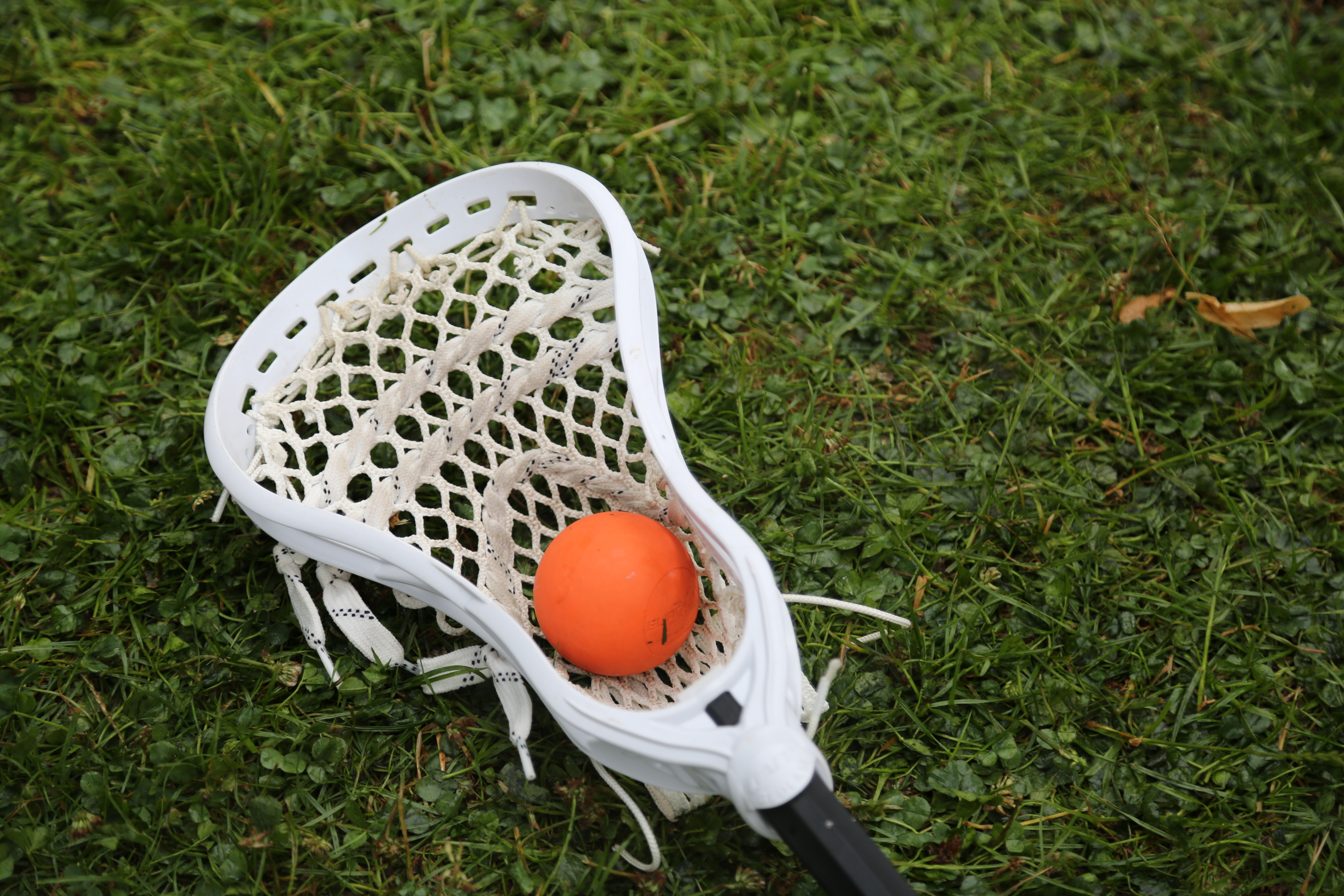
An orange lacrosse ball cradled by a lacrosse stick.

A lacrosse ball is the solid rubber ball that is used, with a lacrosse stick, to play the sport of lacrosse. It is typically white for men's lacrosse (however, the PLL uses optic yellow balls for better TV visibility), or yellow for women's lacrosse, but the balls are produced in a wide variety of colours.

The current World Lacrosse, NCAA, and NFHS approved specifications are:

Color
Can be white, yellow or orange.
Diameter
Between 2.47 and 2.55 inches (6.27 and 6.47 cm).
Weight
Between 5 and 5 1/2 ounces (141.75 and 155.92 grams)
Material
Solid rubber
Bounce
The ball, when dropped from a height of 72 inches (1.83 meters) must bounce between 43 and 51 inches (1.09 and 1.30 meters).

Beginning with the 2014 season, all three governing bodies for lacrosse in the United States (US Lacrosse, NFHS, NCAA) have mandated that only balls meeting the National Operating Committee on Standards for Athletic Equipment (NOCSAE) ball standard may be used for competition. Balls must be emblazoned with the words "Meets NOCSAE Standard" in order to be deemed legal for play by game officials.

Starting by June 2016, all lacrosse balls have had to meet the new NOCSAE Standard for use in official NCAA and NFHS play. Canadian official games require CLA approvals.

== Greasers ==
A new lacrosse ball will have a textured feel, and it feel a little squishy; over time, the ball will become "greasy" and harden. A "greasy" lacrosse ball (often referred to as a "greaser") is a ball that has lost its grip and has hardened; this causes players to throw inaccurately, as the ball no longer grips the mesh in the way a new lacrosse ball would. This degradation occurs naturally in lacrosse balls as oils come to the surface of the ball.

== History ==
=== Pre-1860 ===
The original lacrosse balls were made from wood and egg-shaped, but they would develop to become more round. They were later made from buckskins filled with fur. These were made naturally and was meant to keep the game connected with nature. In Seneca folklore it is said that human heads were used as lacrosse balls.

=== 1860-Present ===
In 1860, Dr. William George Beers codified the rules of lacrosse which included requiring the ball to be made with rubber.

Most modern lacrosse balls are made of vulcanized rubber entirely. At some points some lacrosse balls may have had cement in the middle, but today they are entirely rubber.

== Innovations ==
=== Greaseless lacrosse ball ===
In December 2015, Guardian Innovations released a "greaseless" lacrosse ball known as Pearl X. The Pearl ball is made from a "cross-linked polyurethane formula" which does not contain the oils found in a typical lacrosse ball.

Other greaseless lacrosse balls have been created by brands such as East Coast Dyes, which released the ECD Mint.

On July 27, 2016, US Lacrosse named The Pearl by Guardian the official ball of US Lacrosse and stated it would be used at all US Lacrosse events. This partnership was renewed for the second time in 2021. It is also the official ball, the U.S. National Teams, the MCLA, and the IMCLA.

==== Textured lacrosse ball ====
In March 2019, Guardian Innovations released the first textured lacrosse ball approved for play, the "Pearl LT." The textured ball offers better feel in the pocket of the stick, which increases control and consistency. Unlike Guardian Innovations Pearl X, the Pearl LT is made of rubber, and like other rubber balls, will grease. However, the textured surface of the ball will remain.

=== Smart lacrosse ball ===
On January 14, 2022, at the US Lacrosse Convention, REPS Lacrosse revealed the first "Smart" Lacrosse Ball dubbed the "R1 by REPS". The ball comes equipped with a patented embedded suite of sensors which tie into the REPS Lacrosse App.

== Manufacturers ==
PEARL Lacrosse is the official ball supplier of the Premier Lacrosse League.

As of August 2023, the following ball brands meet NOCSAE standards and are SEI certified:

- BSN Sports
- Champion Sports
- Champro
- CrankShooter
- Dick's Sporting Goods
- Gait
- Gladiator Lacrosse
- Lacrosse Unlimited
- Martin Sports
- Mint by East Coast Dyes
- Pearl LT and Pearl X
- Signature Lacrosse
- STX
- Union
- Velocity
- Wolf Athletics
