= Lacrosse at the 1948 Summer Olympics =

Men's lacrosse at the Games of the XIV Olympiad
- Venue: Wembley Stadium
- Competitors: 35 from 2 nations

Lacrosse was a demonstration sport at the 1948 Summer Olympics in London. Teams from Great Britain and the United States played a single match, which ended in a 5-5 draw. The match was played in Wembley Stadium. Team USA was composed of Rensselaer Polytechnic Institute team members, while Team GB fielded an all-star team.

== Result ==
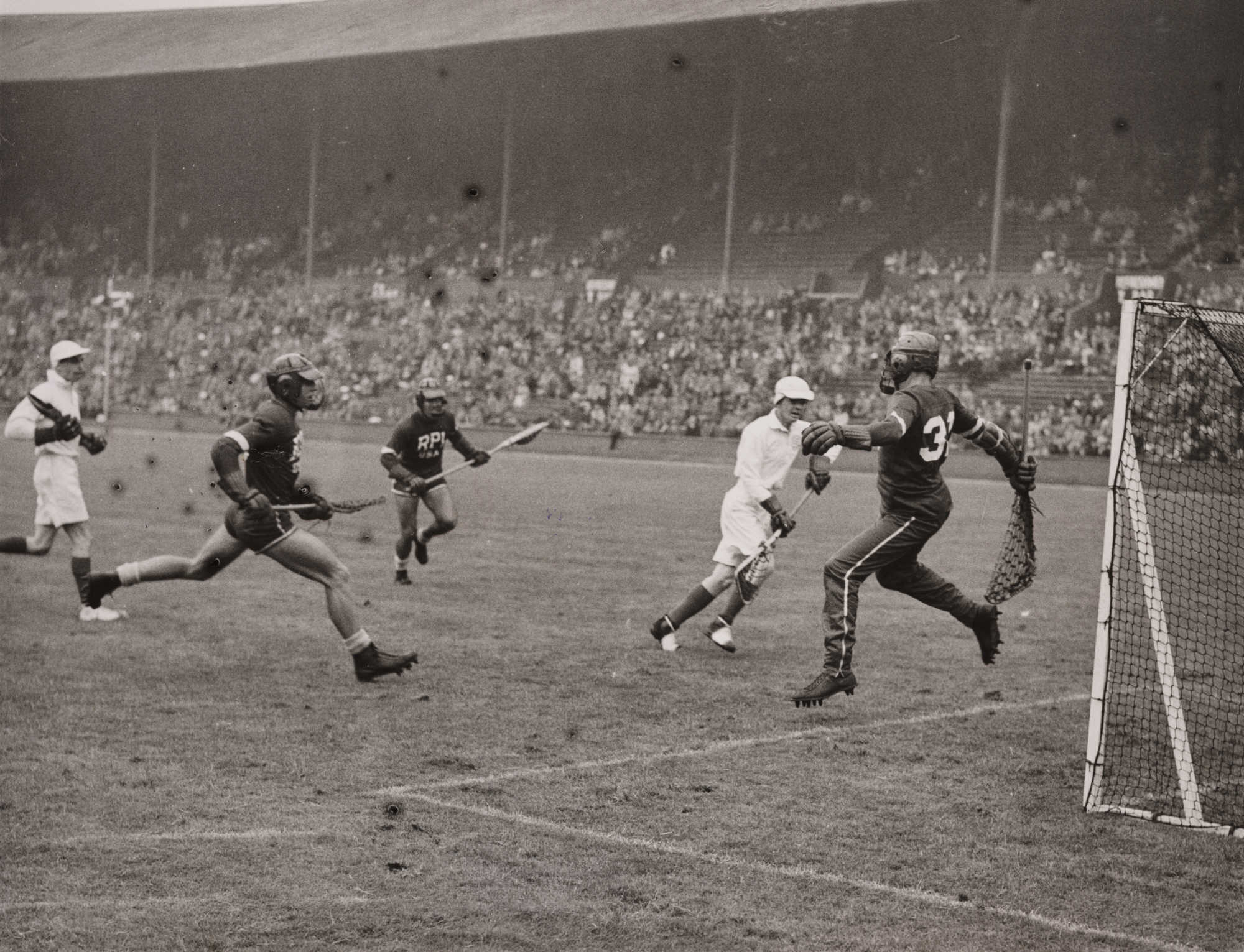
Lacrosse at the 1948 Summer Olympics

Great Britain	5 – 5	United States
	1st period
Whittaker, Little		Coleman, Myers (2), Wood
	2nd period
Wilson		—
	3rd period
—		—
	4th period
Whittaker, Dennis		Myers

== Teams ==
=== Great Britain ===
An "All-England" team organized by the English Lacrosse Union represented Great Britain.

- J. Buckland
- N. R. Coe
- A. L. Dennis
- J. Fletcher
- J. P. Foy
- H. J. Ginn
- J. Griffiths
- J. H. Little
- B. C. Makin
- H. Prime
- R. T. Renshaw
- J. Swindells
- R. V. Wilson
- J. I. Whitehead (Capt.)
- R. N. Whittaker
- H. Wyatt
- R. F. Zimmern

=== United States ===
The team from Rensselaer Polytechnic Institute represented the United States.

- Trody Tronathan (Captain)
- A. D. Beard
- R. Campbell
- W. L. Coleman
- O. Cook
- R. Coons
- M. T. Davies
- R. Frick
- R. Hutcheon
- D. E. Jordan (Capt.)
- R. E. Koch
- C. J. McCann
- J. A. Myers
- R. E. Powell
- R. J. Sneeden
- S. W. Spaulding
- D. R. Sutton
- R. M. Wood

== See also ==
- Federation of International Lacrosse
- World Lacrosse Championship
