= Jessie Hamilton =

American artist

Jessie Marie Hamilton (January 31, 1865 – May 3, 1960) was an American artist. She was a cousin, and intimate friend, of Edith Hamilton.

== Biography ==
Jessie Marie Hamilton was born on January 31, 1865, in Fort Wayne, Indiana, the daughter of Andrew Holman Hamilton (1834–1895) and Phoebe Taber (1841–1932). She had two sisters, Katherine Hamilton (1862–1932) and Agnes Hamilton (1868–1961), both artists like her, and two brothers, Allen Hamilton (1874–1961) and Taber Hamilton (1876–1942). Her cousins are Edith Hamilton, Alice Hamilton, Margaret Hamilton and Norah Hamilton.

Like her sister Katherine, she spent most of her life taking care of their aging mother. She was an artist and studied at the Fort Wayne School of Art from 1888 to 1893, studying under J. Ottis Adams and William Forsyth. She was a founding member of the second Fort Wayne School of Art, where she taught from 1893 to 1898. After the death of her father in 1895, together with her sister Agnes attended the Pennsylvania Academy of the Fine Arts in Philadelphia from 1898 to 1900 studying under Cecilia Beaux. She then went back living in Fort Wayne, Indiana, and focused on portraits in pastel, landscapes in watercolor, as well as etchings.

She exhibited in Philadelphia, St. Louis, Indianapolis, and Richmond (Indiana). Her work was also displayed at the travelling Society of Western Artists Annual Exhibition. Her work is currently in the permanent collection of the Fort Wayne Museum of Art.

According to Alice Hamilton's biographer, Jessie was the best loved of all the cousins. She died on May 3, 1960, in Scottsdale, Arizona, and is buried with her family at Lindenwood Cemetery, Fort Wayne.
