= Katherine Hamilton =

American women's suffrage activist (1863–1932)

Katherine Hamilton (September 4, 1863 – February 5, 1932) was an American women's suffrage activist and a cousin and intimate friend of Alice Hamilton.

== Biography ==
Katherine Hamilton was born on September 4, 1863, the daughter of Andrew Holman Hamilton (1834–1895) and Phoebe Taber (1841–1932). She had two sisters, Jessie Hamilton (1864–1960) and Agnes Hamilton (1868–1961), both artists like her, and two brothers, Allen Hamilton (1874–1961) and Taber Hamilton (1876–1942). Her cousins were Edith Hamilton, Alice Hamilton, Margaret Hamilton and Norah Hamilton.

Despite her intelligence, she was refused the possibility to attend Bryn Mawr College. She studied on her own, and taught her brothers. Like her sister Jessie, she spent all her life taking care of their aging mother, who died after her.

She was the life treasurer of the Women's Reading Club of Fort Wayne, Indiana, and became the first president of the Women's Equal Suffrage League in 1912. She was also active in local music and art societies.

She was very close to her cousin Alice, and after her death on February 5, 1932, said that Katherine was "so close and intimate part of life. I can't think of it without her. I have loved her very, very much - more every year." She is buried at Lindenwood Cemetery, Fort Wayne.
