= Agnes Hamilton =

American social worker (1868–1961)

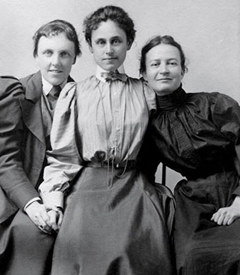
- Theodate Pope, Alice Hamilton, and a student believed to be Agnes Hamilton, 1888. Courtesy of Miss Porter’s School.
- Born: November 21, 1868; Fort Wayne, Indiana
- Died: November 11, 1961 (aged 92)
- Education: Pennsylvania Academy of the Fine Arts
- Parent(s): Andrew Holman Hamilton and Phoebe Taber

Agnes Hamilton (November 21, 1868 – November 11, 1961) was an American social worker and cousin, and intimate friend, of Alice Hamilton.

== Early life ==
Agnes Hamilton was born on November 21, 1868, in Fort Wayne, Indiana, the daughter of Andrew Holman Hamilton (1834–1895) and Phoebe Taber (1841–1932). She had two sisters, Katherine Hamilton (1862–1932) and Jessie Hamilton (1865–1960), both artists like her, and two brothers, Allen Hamilton (1874–1961) and Taber Hamilton (1876–1942). Her cousins are Edith Hamilton, Alice Hamilton, Margaret Hamilton and Norah Hamilton.

From childhood, she had a close bond with her cousins, Alice and Allen Hamilton Williams (1868–1960), the three As, as they called themselves.

Like her four cousins, Edith, Alice, Margaret and Norah, Agnes Hamilton attended Miss Porter's School in Farmington, Connecticut. After the death of her father in 1895, together with her sister Jessie, attended the Pennsylvania Academy of the Fine Arts in Philadelphia from 1898 to 1900 studying under Cecilia Beaux. After school, of the three sisters, only Agnes left home.

== Career ==
She considered various career choices, architecture and art among them, but then became a social worker. Among her achievements: was a liaison between the First Presbyterian Church in Fort Wayne and Nebraska, a Mission School in a poor neighborhood; was a leader in the Women's Club movement; was the leader of the Students' Art League; was the founder and first president of the Local YWCA; opened the first library in Fort Wayne; was among the founders of the Bethany Presbyterian Church.

She was deeply religious and enthusiastically adhered to an evangelical religious movement founded by Frank Buchman, the Oxford Group, that promoted personal reformation and public confessions.

Her first experience of settlement life was in 1897 when she visited her cousin Alice at Hull House. In 1902 she became a resident of the Lighthouse, a Philadelphia settlement house, where she served as a director and member of the executive committee until the early 1930s.

== Personal life ==
Following their mother's death, Jessie and Agnes moved to their summer home in Connecticut, close to their cousins.

She died on November 11, 1961, and is buried at Lindenwood Cemetery, Fort Wayne, with her family.

== Legacy ==
A statue to Edith, Alice and Agnes Hamilton is dedicated in Headwaters Park in downtown Fort Wayne.

In 2005, Indiana University–Purdue University Fort Wayne formed the Society of Hamilton Sisters to honor the achievements, service contributions, and outstanding accomplishments of middle and high school girls.
