= Bulfinch's Mythology =

Popular 1867 book on Greek, Roman, and medieval mythology

- Author: Thomas Bulfinch
- Language: English
- Subject: Greek mythology, Roman mythology, Arthurian legends, the Mabinogeon and Charlemagne legends
- Genre: Mythology
- Publisher: Lee & Shepard
- Publication date: 1867
- Publication place: United States
- Media type: Print

Bulfinch's Mythology is a collection of tales from myth and legend rewritten for a general readership by the American Latinist and banker Thomas Bulfinch, published after his death in 1867. The work was a successful popularization of Greek mythology for English-speaking readers.

Carl J. Richard comments (with John Talbot of Brigham Young University concurring) that it was "one of the most popular books ever published in the United States and the standard work on classical mythology for nearly a century", until the release of classicist Edith Hamilton's 1942 Mythology: Timeless Tales of Gods and Heroes. By 1987, there were more than 100 editions of Bulfinch's Mythology in the National Union Catalog, and in a survey of amazon.com in November 2014 there were 229 print editions and 19 e‑books. Talbot opined that, of the many available, Richard P. Martin's 1991 edition is "by far the most useful and extensive critical treatment".

== Contents ==
The book is a prose recounting of myths and stories from three eras: Greek and Roman mythology, King Arthur legends and medieval romances. Bulfinch intersperses the stories with his own commentary, and with quotations from writings by his contemporaries that refer to the story under discussion. This combination of classical elements and modern literature was novel for his time.

Bulfinch expressly intended his work for the general reader, and not as a school textbook but as "a classical dictionary for the parlour". In the preface to The Age of Fable he states "Our work is not for the learned, nor for the theologian, nor for the philosopher, but for the reader of English literature, of either sex, who wishes to comprehend the allusions so frequently made by public speakers, lecturers, essayists, and poets, and those which occur in polite conversation." Despite this, the Mythology did actually displace earlier, and more comprehensive, school textbooks in the United States such as Andrew Tooke's 1698 Pantheon, an English translation of François Pomey's 1659 Latin Pantheum Mysticum.

Five Colleges associate and classics teacher Marie S. Cleary described The Age of Fable as an "abridged, bowdlerized, and rearranged Ovid", a description that was also applied by Victor Bers in his overview of mythographic literature in Yale Review in 1985. Most of the material in it was drawn from Ovid's Metamorphoses, mainly in much the same arrangement including the story of Prometheus followed by Apollo and Daphne, Arachne being linked to Niobe, and Pythagoras following the classical myths. There are additional chapters on "Eastern" and "Northern" mythology, Apuleius' Cupid and Psyche, and some material from Virgil. Some structural differences from Ovid include the combination of Latona with Io, Callisto, and Actaeon instead of Niobe.

As an example of the abridgment and bowdlerization, Ovid's telling of the story of Proserpine in the Underworld is, at over 300 hexameters, twice as long as Bulfinch's; from which the latter omits several subplots, condenses Ovid's fragmentary account of Arethusa, and excludes or alters all of Ovid's sexual references (e.g. Proserpine tucking flowers into her apron rather than into her bosom as Ovid had it). In general, Bulfinch excludes anything where Ovid is bawdy, and minimizes any violence and grotesquery. Prometheus is platonic rather than wily and cunning as Hesiod had him.

Bulfinch added to the stories what he termed "poetical citations", drawn from the works of 40 poets (all but three of whom, Longfellow, Lowell, and Bullfinch's brother Stephen Greenleaf, were British). These were illustrations of the use of the mythological tales in English literature.

The tales are structured to flow better than a straightforward encyclopedic or dictionary treatment of them would: Ariadne being used as a common character, for example, to link the tales of Bacchus and Theseus.

By combining classical learning with modern (19th century) literature, Bulfinch sought to give readers a way to connect such distant information to their contemporary lives, a pedagogical approach that, in contrast with Bulfinch's later reputation for being a prudish Victorian, was actually advanced for its time and only later to be seen in the work of John Dewey. Although not aimed at reading solely for pleasure, Bulfinch sought to offer a means of learning as pleasure, a "useful knowledge" that in turn would enhance the pleasure in reading other works.

He viewed the fact that in order to learn about classical mythology, people first had to learn classical languages, which was a stumbling block on the road to learning, and that the era's greater emphasis on learning the sciences meant that there was less time to learn the classics, and as a consequence less understanding of a broad range of literature which referenced classical mythology. Thus his target readership was that of people with no education in Latin or Greek, a growing section of the middle classes in North America and the United Kingdom at the time, who wished to learn the classics but were hampered by what was termed at the time an "English education". In an age of science, he was not expecting people to "devote study to a species of learning that relates wholly to false marvels of obsolete faiths", but rather he sought to enable people to better comprehend English literature, and his concluding every myth account with the "poetical citations" indicates that it was learning the English literature that was the point rather than learning the classical mythology. This is further indicated by his selection of the mythology, and his preference for things like the Keats version of Glaucus and Scylla (from Endymion) rather than any classical poet's version of the tale.

== Publication history ==
Bulfinch originally published his work as three volumes: The Age of Fable, or Stories of Gods and Heroes, published in 1855; The Age of Chivalry, or Legends of King Arthur, published in 1858; and Legends of Charlemagne, or Romance of the Middle Ages, published in 1863. Bulfinch's original three volumes were posthumously combined into a single volume by Edward Everett Hale in 1881, who gave them the title Bulfinch's Mythology.

Some, but not all, editions of The Age of Fable were dedicated to Henry Wadsworth Longfellow.

Bulfinch himself published the "poetical citations" standalone as Poetry of the Age of Fable in 1863. In contrast, Macmillan published a "simplified" edition in 1942 that omitted all of Bulfinch's references to literature.
