= Clara Landsberg =

American educator (1873–1966)

- Born: March 8, 1873; Rochester, New York, U.S.
- Died: April 10, 1966 (aged 93); Lyme, Connecticut, U.S.
- Resting place: Cove Cemetery, Hadlyme, Connecticut, U.S.
- Education: Bryn Mawr College; University of Paris
- Occupation: Educator
- Years active: 1899–1935
- Known for: Leader of adult education program at Hull House; Collaborator of Jane Addams
- Parent(s): Max Landsberg; Miriam Isengarten

Clara Landsberg (March 8, 1873 – April 10, 1966) was an American educator. She was the leader of the adult education programme at Hull House, and was a close collaborator of Nobel laureate Jane Addams. She later taught at Bryn Mawr School with her lifelong friend Margaret Hamilton.

== Early life ==
Clara Landsberg was born in Rochester, New York, the daughter of Max Landsberg, a German-American Reform rabbi, and Miriam Isengarten, a good friend of Susan B. Anthony.

She was one of the first graduates of Bryn Mawr College, where she was a classmate and friend of Margaret Hamilton. She attended the University of Paris as a student of German in the winter 1898–1899, while Margaret Hamilton studied Biology and Norah Hamilton Art. Landsberg was to become Margaret Hamilton's lifetime companion.

After the Sorbonne, while Hamilton was a student at Johns Hopkins University, Landsberg became the Reference Librarian at the Reynolds' Library, Rochester, New York.

== Career ==
In 1899 Clara Landsberg became a resident at Hull House, where she was in charge of the adult education (evening school) programs from 1900 to 1920, and shared a room with Alice Hamilton. Landsberg and Ethel Dewey interviewed each new student, and each was carefully placed according to his attainments and later was graded upon reports made by the teachers. For the most part of her time at Hull House, Landsberg taught German at the University School for Girls. Hilda S. Polacheck, a Polish immigrant, later said about Landsberg: "She opened new vistas in reading for me. In her class we would be assigned a book, which we were to read during the week and then discuss the following session of the class. The class met once a week. I not only read the assigned books but every book I could borrow. Dickens, Scott, Thackeray, Louisa May Alcott, Victor Hugo, Alexander Dumas, and many others now become my friends. The daily monotony of making cuffs was eased by thinking of these books and looking forward to evenings at Hull House."

In her 1912 Twenty Years at Hull-House with Autobiographical Notes, Jane Addams said she was grateful to Landsberg "for the making of the index and for many other services".

In May 1914, Landsberg, together with Louise DeKoven Bowen, joined Addams and Mary Rozet Smith in Naples, and the four women travelled together to Sicily and Rome. Landsberg and Smith sailed back to the United States in June. In 1933, together with Alice Hamilton, went on a trip to Germany to protest the discharge of Jewish doctors.

Landsberg eventually left Hull House to teach Latin at Bryn Mawr School, where Edith Hamilton was headmistress. Margaret Hamilton also became a science teacher at Bryn Mawr School and took over as headmistress in 1933 before retiring in 1935.

== Personal life ==
Alice Hamilton considered Clara Landsberg part of the Hamilton family, "I could not think of a life in which Clara did not have a great part, she has become part of my life almost as if she were one of us."

Landsberg, the Hamilton sisters and Edith's companion, Doris Fielding Reid, spent their retirement years in Hadlyme, Connecticut, at the house they purchased in 1916.

Landsberg died in Lyme in 1966, and is buried with Margaret Hamilton at Cove Cemetery in Hadlyme, Connecticut, in the same cemetery as Hamilton's mother (Gertrude) and her sisters (Alice, Norah, and Edith), and Doris Fielding Reid.

== Legacy ==
The Clara Landsberg papers consisting of correspondence addressed to Clara Landsberg are preserved at the Special Collections and University Archives, University of Illinois at Chicago.
