= Max Landsberg =

American rabbi (1845–1927)

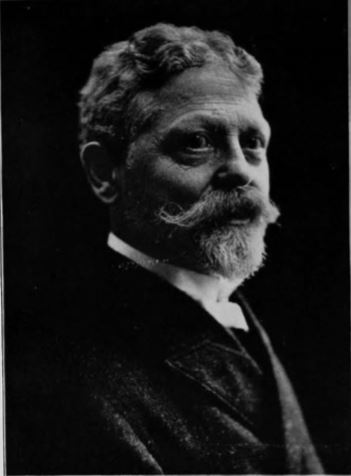
- Born: February 26, 1845; Berlin, Prussia
- Died: December 9, 1927 (aged 82); Rochester, New York, U.S.
- Education: University of Göttingen; University of Breslau; Jewish Theological Seminary of Breslau; University of Halle
- Occupation: Rabbi
- Years active: 1867–1914
- Known for: Senior rabbi of B'rith Kodesh Congregation; Contributor to 1917 Jewish Publication Society Torah translation
- Spouse: Miriam Isengarten
- Children: Emil Landsberg; Clara Landsberg; Rose Landsberg
- Parent: Meyer Landsberg

Max Landsberg (February 26, 1845 – December 9, 1927), senior rabbi of the B'rith Kodesh Congregation, Rochester, New York, was one of the best known and most beloved Jewish religious leaders in the United States.

== Early life and education ==
Born on February 26, 1845, in Berlin, Prussia, Max Landsberg was the eldest son of the rabbi Meyer Landsberg (1810–1870). He was brought up in Hildesheim where his father was appointed rabbi. After matriculating from high school in 1862, he studied philosophy and oriental philology at the universities of Göttingen and Breslau, completing his studies at the Jewish Theological Seminary of Breslau where he received his rabbinical degree. In 1866, he earned a doctorate from the University of Halle.

== Career ==
From 1867, he taught at the seminary in Hanover until 1871 when, on the recommendation of the Jewish reformer Abraham Geiger (1810–1874), he moved to Rochester where he was elected rabbi of the B'rith Kodesh congregation, taking up his appointment in March 1871. In addition to his religious duties, thanks to his scholarship and his interest in philanthropy, he was soon recognized as one of the city's most eminent citizens. By 1894, under his leadership the B'rith Kodesh congregation had grown to more than 250.

Langsberg was also active in supporting Rochester's charitable societies, aimed at improving conditions for the poor and needy. Under the United Hebrew Charities of Rochester, these included the Hebrew Benevolent Society, established in 1850, and the Hebrew Ladies' Benevolent Society (1865). He also contributed to social welfare and rights for immigrants, hosting events at the synagogue, including a presentation by the Danish-American social reformer Jacob Riis in 1901. Events were open to the public, in line with Landsberg's efforts to develop collaboration with Christian churches interested in similar objectives.

Over his 43 years of service, Landsberg became recognized as one of the best-known rabbis in the United States and was above all appreciated by the people of Rochester. Not only was he at the forefront of the country's Jewish progress, but he also participated actively in several movements centered on improving conditions in the city.

Inside the first edition of the 1917 Jewish Publication Society English version of the Torah, he is credited for supplying the translation of Genesis.

Landsberg retired from his position in January 1914. He died in Rochester on December 9, 1927.

== Family ==
Landsberg married Miriam Isengarten (1847–1912) on February 26, 1871. The couple had four children: Emil, Clara, Rose and Grace. Miriam Isengarten was friends with Susan B. Anthony. Clara Landsberg was a close collaborator of Jane Addams at Hull House and became the lifelong friend of Margaret Hamilton, near whom is buried now at Cove Cemetery in Hadlyme, Connecticut.

== Publications ==
Landsberg published a number of works, including Hymn book, for Jewish worship (1880), Ritual for Jewish worship (1885), The position of woman among the Jews (1893), and Outline of the Jewish religion (1899).
