= Stephen Greenleaf Bulfinch =

American Unitarian clergyman, author and hymn writer (1809-1870)

- Born: June 18, 1809; Boston, Massachusetts
- Died: October 12, 1870 (aged 61); Cambridge, Massachusetts
- Spouse(s): Clergyman, author, writer

Stephen Greenleaf Bulfinch (June 18, 1809 - October 12, 1870) was an American Unitarian clergyman, author and hymn writer.

== Early life ==
Stephen Greenleaf Bulfinch (often referred to as S.G. Bulfinch) was born in Boston, Massachusetts on June 18, 1809, the tenth child of Charles Bulfinch, Architect of the Capitol and Hannah Apthorp, who were first cousins. He was the brother of Thomas Bulfinch (1796–1867), author of Bulfinch's Mythology. Stephen was named after his mother's father, Stephen Greenleaf, the last Loyalist sheriff of Essex County, Massachusetts.

He moved to Washington, D.C. in 1818, when his father began work on building the United States Capitol rotunda and graduated from Columbian College in Washington D.C. (later George Washington University) in 1826 with a Bachelor of Arts degree, and earned his Doctor of Divinity degree from Harvard Divinity School in 1830.

The Rev. Edward Young told the Massachusetts Historical Society in 1892 that Bulfinch told him he had wished to become an architect like his father.

"But his father dissuaded him, saying that most of the States already had their capitols erected, and that if he should devote himself to this occupation, there would probably not be enough for him to do. Accordingly, he became a clergyman."

In 1831, he was ordained at Charleston, South Carolina as Assistant Minister serving with Rev. Samuel Gilman at the Second Independent Church of Charleston, a theologically Unitarian congregation. Subsequently, he served as a minister in Pittsburgh, Pennsylvania, in Washington, D.C. from 1838, in Nashua, New Hampshire from 1845, in Dorchester, Massachusetts from 1852; and lastly in East Cambridge, Massachusetts from 1865 until his death.

He died at Cambridge, Massachusetts, October 12, 1870.

Bulfinch composed numerous hymns, which gained wide use across the country. Many were made known in England through Beard's Collection of Hymns, published in 1837, in which 19 were published.

== Works ==
- Contemplation of the Saviour: A Series of Extracts from the Gospel History, with Reflections and Original and Selected Hymns. Boston: Carter and Hendee, 1832
- Biographies of Self-Taught Men, Boston: Perkins & Marvin, 1832 (with Bela Bates Edwards)
- Poems, Charleston, S.C., 1834.
- The Holy Land and Its Inhabitants, 1834
- Lays of the Gospel 1845.
- Communion Thoughts, 1850
- Palestine and the Hebrew People, 1853
- The Harp and the Cross a selection of hymns, 1857
- Honor, or the Slaveholder’s Daughter, 1864
- Manual of the Evidences of Christianity, 1866
- Studies in the Evidences of Christianity, 1866

== Hymns ==
- Hail to the Sabbath day
- 'Hath not thy heart within thee burned?
- O, suffering friend of human kind
