= Norah Hamilton =

USA Artist and educator

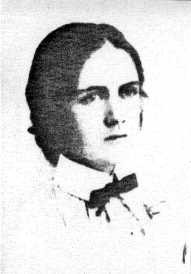
Norah Hamilton

Norah Hamilton (December 3, 1873 – February 9, 1945) was an American artist, and the director of the Children's Art program at Hull House where she lived for more than 20 years. She was a pioneer in art education for underprivileged children.

== Biography ==
Hamilton was born on December 3, 1873, in Fort Wayne, Indiana, the daughter of Gertrude Pond (1840–1917) and Montgomery Hamilton (1843–1909). Her older sister Edith Hamilton (1867–1963) was an internationally-known author who was one of the most renowned classicist of her era; Alice Hamilton (1869–1970) was one of the founders of industrial medicine; Margaret Hamilton (1871–1969) was an educator; Arthur Hamilton (1886–1967) was a writer, professor of Spanish, and assistant dean for foreign students at the University of Illinois at Urbana-Champaign. Three cousins, sisters Katherine Hamilton (1862-1932), Jessie Hamilton (1864-1960) and Agnes Hamilton (1868-1961) were artists like Norah, and Agnes was a settlement worker as well.

She first attended the Miss Porter's School, Farmington, Connecticut, and then the Fort Wayne School of Art, studying under J. Ottis Adams and William Forsyth. Later she moved to the Art Students League of New York, studying under William Merritt Chase, Robert Henri and Kenyon Cox.

In 1898, while her sister Margaret was studying Biology in Paris, and Margaret's partner German at the Sorbonne, Norah Hamilton was with them studying under James McNeill Whistler. While in Paris, she had an emotional breakdown that forced her first to be recovered in Zurich and then to return to the United States. Depression would accompany her for the rest of her life.

By 1909 she went to work with her sister Alice at Hull House where she remained until 1930. She became a teacher and in 1921, director of the Children's Art program. Hamilton also made artworks for publications by Hull House, like "Pottery from the Hull House" sponsored by Myrtle Meritt French, and for decoration around the Settlement House. She illustrated Twenty Years at Hull-House with Autobiographical Notes written by Jane Addams in 1910 and Exploring the Dangerous Trades written by her sister Alice in 1943.

She was a pioneer in Art Education for underprivileged children in Chicago and New York City.

She was a member of the Chicago Society of Etchers, founded in January 1910, the first organization of etchers in the country.

The Hamilton sisters, their mother, Edith's companion, Doris Fielding Reid, and Margaret's companion, Clara Landsberg, spent their retirement years in Hadlyme, Connecticut, at the house they purchased in 1916. The house was near Miss Porter's School in Farmington, Connecticut, that all four of the Hamilton sisters had attended.

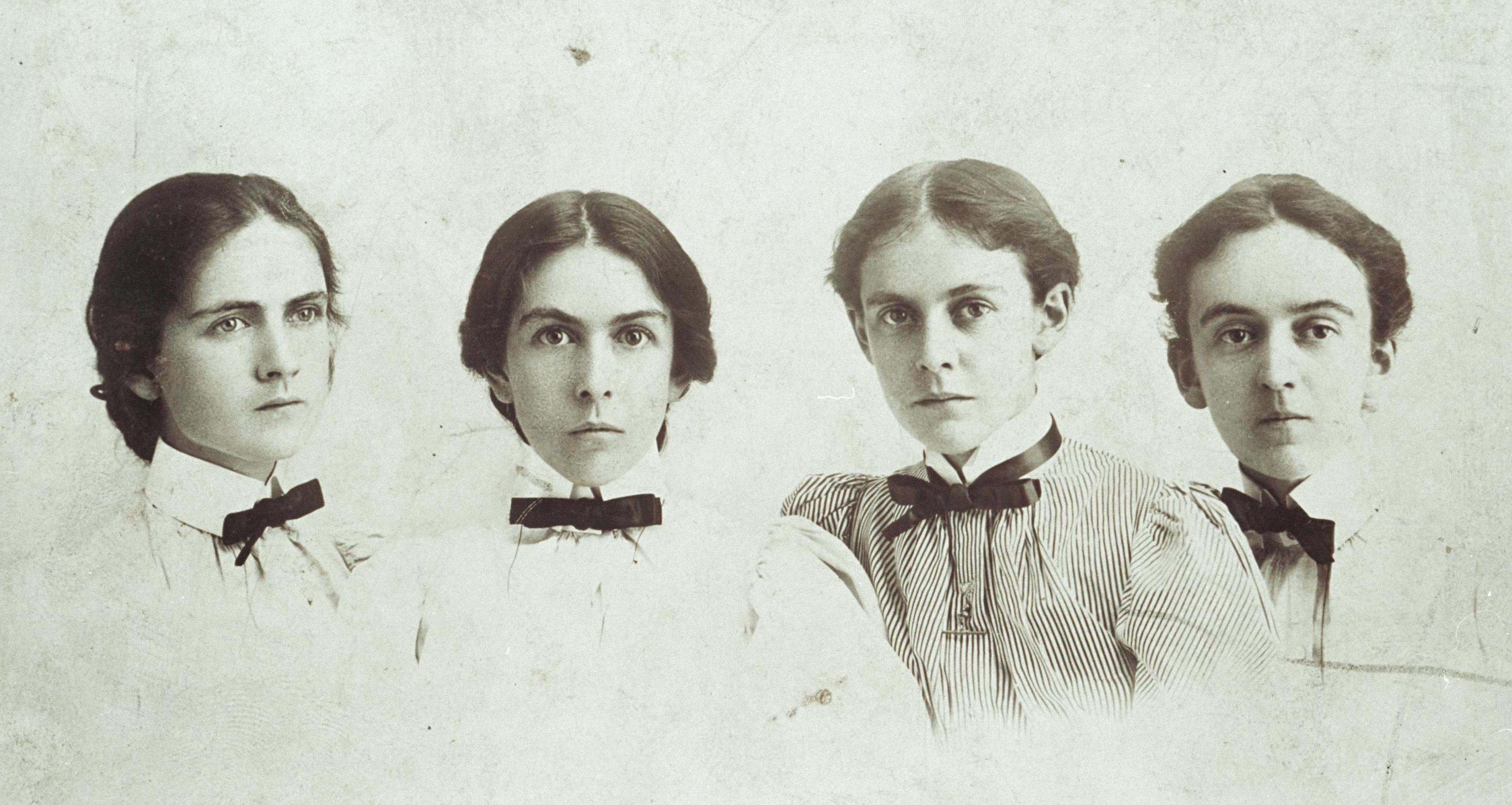
The Hamilton sisters: Edith, Alice, Margaret and Norah

Hamilton never married and never had children. She died on February 9, 1945, in New York. She is buried at Cove Cemetery in Hadlyme, Connecticut, in the same cemetery as Hamilton's mother (Gertrude) and her sisters (Alice, Margaret, and Edith), and Edith and Margaret's life partners, Doris Fielding Reid and Clara Landsberg.

== Exhibitions ==
- Works by American Etchers. Chicago Society of Etchers. AIC. 1911
