= Bryn Mawr School =

Girls' school in Baltimore, Maryland, US

Location
- 109 W. Melrose Avenue; Baltimore, Maryland; United States; 39°21′51″N 76°37′45″W

Information
- Type: Private, Day
- Motto: Ex solo ad solem (From the Ground to the Sun)
- Established: 1885
- Sister school: Roland Park Country School; Gilman School for Boys
- Head of School: Sue Sadler
- Faculty: 147
- Grades: P–12
- Gender: Girls; Co-ed (preschool)
- Enrollment: 712 (2024)
- Campus: Urban, 26 acres (110,000 m^{2}) on main campus Conference and Athletic Facilities at the Mount Washington Center
- Colors: yellow, green, and white
- Athletics conference: IAAM
- Mascot: Lamb, Mawrtian (present day)
- Rival: St. Timothy's School
- Website: www.brynmawrschool.org

Bryn Mawr School, founded in 1885 as the first college-preparatory school for girls in the United States, is an independent, nonsectarian all-girls school for grades PK-12, with a coed preschool. Bryn Mawr School is located in the Roland Park section of Baltimore, Maryland.

== Bryn Mawr School Community ==
In 2023–2024, Bryn Mawr School had 147 faculty members and 712 students. Boys are admitted into the pre-school division, known as the Little School. Students from Bryn Mawr's sibling schools, Roland Park Country School and The Gilman School are allowed to take classes in the Upper School.

Each student in the Middle and Upper School is assigned an Advisor in their division who serves as their representative to the school. Advisory groups meet together throughout the week for discussions and celebrations, and work together on a variety of charitable and service projects.

== History ==
The Bryn Mawr School for Girls of Baltimore City was founded in 1885 by five Baltimore women, M. Carey Thomas, Mary Elizabeth Garrett, Mamie Gwinn, Bessie King, and Julia Rogers, collectively known as the "Friday Evening" Group. The group's aim was to provide an education for girls equivalent to that available to boys. In an 1883 letter to James E. Rhoads, who was the first president of the Bryn Mawr College, M. Carey Thomas shared her concern for how they would find young women prepared for the unprecedented rigorous standards of the new college: "The absence of the regularly organized preparatory schools that exist for boys greatly embarrasses a girl who means to enter college."

The school had a predominantly educated female faculty, and a curriculum that required Latin and French, German and Greek, laboratory sciences, history, literature, advanced mathematics, elocution and art. Students would undergo examinations with the supervision of university professors and had to pass the entrance exam for Bryn Mawr College in order to graduate.

Mary Elizabeth Garrett, who became the wealthiest “spinster woman” in the country after the death of her father John Work Garrett, was the main benefactor. She was often onsite during the construction of the school building in downtown Baltimore from 1888 to 1890, which featured an indoor swimming pool with cold “needle baths,” a gymnasium with a suspended track, and the Sargent School of Boston, as well as a full-time physician to oversee athletic and posture programs. Upstairs were scientific laboratories, an art room, and a library. The study hall bore a copy of the Parthenon Frieze and copies of European and American statuary and artwork throughout the building for the girls to study and draw. A model of the building was made for the Columbian Exposition of 1893 in Chicago and numerous articles about it appeared in newspapers across the country. The school was seen as a move forward for women's education reaching far beyond Baltimore and Pennsylvania.

After a series of Secretaries who managed the daily running of the school, the Board of Managers brought Edith Hamilton from her doctoral studies in Europe to be the first Headmistress. Edith guided the school from 1896 to 1922.

As the city became more congested and families moved out to the country, there was an urgent need to move the school. The 26-acre (110,000 m^{2}) property known as The Orchards was purchased in 1928 from the Gordon family north of the city line, and the school spent several years acquiring the funds to gradually move out of its home downtown and into renovated and new buildings in the country. Over the years buildings have been added as needed. The same stone that had been used to build the Gatehouse in the 19th century was found at the Butler quarry in Baltimore County and was used in the construction of Garrett (1931), Hamilton (1953), and the North Building (2007). Other structures built of complementary materials include Howell (1969) which houses the Upper School and the Edith Hamilton Library, Hardy (1969) for science and math, the Cafeteria (1948), Katherine Van Bibber Gymnasium (1959), the Lower School complex designed by Marcel Breuer (1972), Centennial Hall (1987), the Barbara Landis Chase Dance Studio (1992), the Lower School Science building (1996), the Admissions Cottage (1997), and a variety of small outbuildings and additions.

== Academics ==
Coordination of classes with the adjacent boys' school at Gilman School and girls' school at Roland Park Country School at the Upper School level offers Bryn Mawr students a variety of electives and the opportunity for coeducational classes. These coordinated classes are concentrated in the junior and senior years.

Many students take two years of Latin and three years of either French or Spanish in Middle School. They often continue one or both in the Upper School and have the option of following a double language track. Offerings in other foreign languages including Chinese, Arabic, Russian, and Greek begin in the ninth grade and are usually coordinated with Gilman and Roland Park.

Graduation Requirements: Arts and fine arts (art, music, dance, drama), introduction to computer science, English, a foreign language, history, mathematics, physical education (includes health), public speaking, science, 50 hours of community service, and a convocation speech.

== Athletics ==
On November 25, 1901, Bryn Mawr and St. Timothy's School began what is thought to be the longest continuous girls' high school basketball rivalry in the country, with a silver cup dedicated to the game passed between the schools. The game was played nine on nine on a court divided into three sections, with groups of three in each section. The uniforms were high-collared white blouses over long corduroy skirts, black stockings and white athletic shoes. The game was played outdoors without a backboard, on a dirt field which would be covered with straw to absorb dampness if necessary. The headmistresses of both schools agreed to a list of rules and conditions, which included prohibiting male spectators (with the exception of William Marston, the Headmaster of Marston School who officiated the game) and guaranteed that none of the girls' names would be published in the newspapers. The game was moved inside in 1928 as interest in field hockey as an outdoor fall sport grew. In December 2011, the two schools played a game in the old-fashioned clothes and rules to commemorate the first game played between the two schools.

In 1926 Rosabelle Sinclair established the first American women's lacrosse team at The Bryn Mawr School, bringing the Native American game to the United States from St Leonards School in Scotland (where it had arrived from Canada). In 1992 she was the first woman inducted into the National Lacrosse Hall of Fame. The first game was held against Friends School of Baltimore. Since 1999, Bryn Mawr has shared Norris Field with the Mount Washington Lacrosse Club, one of the most successful amateur lacrosse teams in history.

The athletics program today provides a wide range of offerings for competitive play including cross country, track, volleyball, basketball, softball, crew, squash, ice hockey, swimming, and dance.

In 2010, the Bryn Mawr Ice Hockey team won their first championship, defeating Holton Arms. The varsity soccer team won three back-to-back IAAM championships in 2009, 2010 and 2011.

Like many of the other private schools in Baltimore, Bryn Mawr has a brother and sister school. Bryn Mawr's brother school is Gilman, located across the street. Bryn Mawr's sister school (as well as rival school) is the Roland Park Country School (RPCS). The three schools coordinate Upper School classes so that students may attend a wider variety of classes and so that they may interact with their peers at other schools. Twice an academic year, once in the fall and once in the spring, RPCS and Bryn Mawr hold Spirit Weeks, during which the two schools play games against each other in sports such as field hockey and lacrosse. During the school days of these weeks, students wear costumes in addition to the uniform skirt.

== Traditions ==
- Founders Day: On a day in late September/early October, the entire school gathers in the morning in the Graduation Garden to celebrate the founding of the School in 1885. Faculty and staff awards are presented for recognition of outstanding service to the community.
- Bazaar: The Bazaar, begun in 1948 by the Parent's Association, is held on the first Saturday of May and includes activities for all the members of the school community including games, rides, and markets.
- Gym Drill: After the Bazaar, the Bryn Mawr community gathers at the upper athletic field for Gym Drill. The Middle and Upper School perform an all-school dance and school exercises which have been performed since 1904, followed by each class in the Middle and Upper Schools performing an ethnic dance. In addition, the seniors perform a dance that they have choreographed. Reunion alumnae classes join in the Banner March in which the Gym Drill captain in each class passes down her banner to mark the completion of the year. The Fifth Grade marches onto the field at the end to receive their first banner, marking the end of their Lower School days.
- Bell Ringing: The day before senior projects, each senior rings the bell in the 1992 Belltower with another Bryn Mawr student of her choice (or multiple students).
- Class Day: The day before senior graduation, Grades 7–12 gather for a ceremony to mark the end of the school year.
- Graduation: in early June.

== Notable alumnae and faculty ==
- Bess Armstrong (class of 1971), actress
- Margaret Barker, actress (an original member of The Group Theatre, 1931)
- Vashti Bartlett, Red Cross nurse in World War I
- Anne S. K. Brown, military historian
- Nancy L. R. Bucher, cell biologist
- Gabrielle D. Clements, painter, print maker, and muralist
- Elizabeth Donald, author
- Frances Scott Fitzgerald, writer, journalist, and prominent member of the Democratic Party; the only child of F. Scott Fitzgerald and Zelda Fitzgerald
- Kisha Ford, basketball player
- Mary Elizabeth Garrett, Bryn Mawr School founder, whose philanthropy was also fundamental in the support of Bryn Mawr College and the Johns Hopkins University School of Medicine
- Leonie Gilmour (class of 1891), writer
- Julia Haller, ophthalmologist
- Edith Hamilton, headmistress 1896–1922, author of The Greek Way (1930)
- Margaret Hamilton, headmistress 1933–1935
- Ethel Browne Harvey, embryologist
- Anna Hiss, professor of physical education
- Kate Campbell Hurd-Mead, pioneering feminist and obstetrician
- Nan Knighton, poet, playwright and lyricist
- Linda Lange, bacteriologist
- Margo Lion (class of 1962), award-winning Broadway producer
- Louisa Lumsden, pioneer of female education
- Millicent Carey McIntosh (class of 1916), headmistress of the Brearley School for 17 years and the first married female president of a Seven Sisters College, serving at Barnard College from 1947 to 1962
- Ida Martha Metcalf, the second American woman to receive a Ph.D. in mathematics
- Sheila Murnaghan (class of 1969), classicist
- Heather Murren, businesswoman
- Mildred Natwick (class of 1924), actress
- Eleanor Phelps (class of 1924), actress
- Julia Randall (class of 1941), poet
- Sandra Scarr, psychologist and writer
- Rosabelle Sinclair, who established the first women's lacrosse team in the United States
- Louise L. Sloan, ophthalmologist and vision scientist
- Leslie Crocker Snyder, lawyer and judge
- Nancy Soderberg (class of 1974), foreign policy strategist and author
- Peggy Speas (class of 1969), linguist
- Isabelle Stone, physicist and co-founder of American Physical Society
- Marcia Talley, award-winning mystery novelist
- M. Carey Thomas, founder of Bryn Mawr School
- Esther Boise Van Deman, leading archaeologist of the late 19th and early 20th centuries
- Natalie Wexler (class of 1972), novelist
- Melanie Whelan (class of 1995), former chief executive officer of SoulCycle
- Karine Gibbs (class of 1996), microbiologist and immunologist
