= Nancy L. R. Bucher =

American physician

Nancy Leslie Rutherford Bucher (May 4, 1913 – February 16, 2017) was an American physician who was a pioneering scholar in the fields of liver cell regeneration and hepatocyte cultures. Bucher attended Bryn Mawr School and Bryn Mawr College, and was one of the first women to receive an MD degree from the Johns Hopkins University School of Medicine.

Bucher was born in Baltimore, the daughter of Lula Etta Langrell and John Howard Bucher. She died in Boston at 104.
