= Meyer Landsberg =

German rabbi (1810–1870)

Rabbi Meyer Landsberg

Personal life
- Born: 1 May 1810 Meseritz, Prussia
- Died: 20 May 1870 (aged 60) Hildesheim, Province of Hanover, Prussia
- Children: Max Landsberg; Theodor Landsberg

Religious life
- Religion: Judaism

Meyer Landsberg (Hebrew: מאיר לנדסברג; May 1, 1810 – May 20, 1870) was a German rabbi.

== Biography ==
Landsberg's teacher, Aaron Wolfsohn, rabbi of Wöllstein, was elected to the rabbinate of Hildesheim in 1826, and Landsberg accompanied him and lived under his roof until Wolfsohn's death in 1830. Landsberg then went to Brunswick, where he continued his rabbinical studies while preparing for the university at the Brunswick gymnasium. He studied at the University of Berlin from 1834 to 1838. At Berlin he became closely connected with Leopold Zunz; with him he organized the Seminary for Jewish Teachers in 1840, in which institution he was an instructor until 1845. A lifelong friendship with Zunz was established, with whom he corresponded until his death. In 1837 he passed his state's examination as Oberlehrer, and his certificate contained the then-dusual clause, that, being a Jew, he had no claim to a position at a higher school.

In 1835 Landsberg was engaged as teacher at the Nauensche Institute for the education of boys, and from 1839 to 1846 he was its director, in which position David Cassel was his successor. From 1838 to 1846 he preached regularly at the bet ha-midrash and at the synagogue of Commerzienrath Lieberman. In 1846 he was appointed Landesrabbiner of Hildesheim, which position he filled until his death.

Although himself very strict in the observance of the ceremonial law, he was of a progressive spirit. In the synagogue built during his administration (1849) an organ was introduced, a mixed choir established, some German prayers introduced, and the piyyuṭim nearly all abolished. Confirmations of boys and girls were held every year.

== Personal life ==
Landsberg's eldest son was Dr. Max Landsberg, rabbi at Rochester, New York. His second son was architectural scholar Theodor Landsberg of the Technische Hochschule at Darmstadt.
