= Natalie Wexler =

American novelist

- Born: 1955 (age 70–71)
- Citizenship: American
- Education: Bryn Mawr School; Radcliffe College (AB); University of Sussex (MA); University of Pennsylvania (JD)
- Occupation: Writer
- Known for: Literacy advocate, legal historian
- Spouse: James Feldman

Natalie L. Wexler is an American education writer focusing on literacy and equity issues.

== Background and career ==
Wexler is a graduate of the Bryn Mawr School in Baltimore and Radcliffe College (A.B. 1976, magna cum laude), where she wrote for the Harvard Crimson. After college she worked as a reporter at the Winston-Salem Journal.

Wexler also has degrees from the University of Sussex (Master of Arts 1977), and the University of Pennsylvania Law School (Juris Doctor 1983), where she served as editor-in-chief of the University of Pennsylvania Law Review. After graduating law school, she worked as a law clerk for Judge Alvin Benjamin Rubin of the U.S. Court of Appeals for the Fifth Circuit, and then for Associate Justice Byron R. White of the United States Supreme Court. Following her clerkships, she practiced law at Bredhoff & Kaiser in Washington, D.C. She later served as an associate editor of the eight-volume series The Documentary History of the Supreme Court, 1789-1800.

Wexler has written articles and essays for a number of publications, including the New York Times, The Atlantic, and the Washington Post. Beginning in 2010 she shifted her focus to education writing and served as education editor of the website Greater Greater Washington for several years. She is currently a senior contributor to Forbes.com focusing on education. She has been interviewed on many TV and radio shows and podcasts, including Morning Joe and NPR’s On Point and 1A.

In 1986, she married James Feldman, an attorney who was a Supreme Court clerk for Justice William J. Brennan.

== The Knowledge Gap ==
Wexler's first non-fiction book as a solo author, The Knowledge Gap (2019), addresses the achievement gap between schoolchildren on the higher and lower ends of the socioeconomic scale. Wexler argues that, particularly in elementary schools, reading comprehension is taught as a set of skills that can be acquired and tested through exercises like "finding the main idea," when in fact comprehension depends largely on the reader's background knowledge and vocabulary. Wexler rejects the idea that reading comprehension "can be taught in a manner completely disconnected from content" and argues that the increasing time devoted to skills-based comprehension exercises in schools has crowded out the systematic teaching of knowledge. More privileged children have the opportunity to acquire more academic knowledge and vocabulary outside of school, while many less privileged children arrive at high school unprepared to read and understand texts that assume background knowledge they have not been given access to. Wexler therefore concludes that the achievement gap is largely a gap in knowledge rather than skills and supports the adoption of elementary literacy curricula that focus on building knowledge. The Knowledge Gap examines attempts to implement this kind of curriculum in several schools and school districts in the United States and the United Kingdom. Wexler's argument has been compared to that of E.D. Hirsch, an education scholar who has been advancing similar ideas since the 1980s.

Wexler’s previous education book, The Writing Revolution (2017), was written with Judith C. Hochman and provides a guide to implementing the method of writing instruction that Hochman developed. In contrast to most other approaches to writing instruction, the method begins at the sentence level and is designed to be embedded in the content of a school’s core curriculum.

Wexler has also written three novels: A More Obedient Wife (2007), based on the lives and letters of two early Supreme Court justices and their wives; The Mother Daughter Show (2011), a satire set at an elite Washington, DC private school; and The Observer (2014), set in the early 19th century and based on the life of Eliza Anderson Godefroy, the first American woman to edit a magazine.

== Selected publications ==
- The Knowledge Gap (2019), ISBN 9780735213555
- The Writing Revolution (2017), ISBN 9781119364917
- The Observer (2014), ISBN 9780615991498
- "What Manner of Woman Our Female Editor May Be": Eliza Crawford Anderson and the Baltimore Observer, 1806-1807, 105 Maryland Historical Magazine 100 (Summer 2010)
- A More Obedient Wife: A Novel of the Early Supreme Court (2007), ISBN 0615135161
- In The Beginning: The First Three Chief Justices, 154 U. Pa. L. Rev. 1373 (2006)
- The Case For Love, 75 Am. Scholar 80 (2006)

== See also ==
- List of law clerks for the sixth seat of the Supreme Court of the United States
