= Thomas Bulfinch =

American compiler of mythologies (1796–1867)

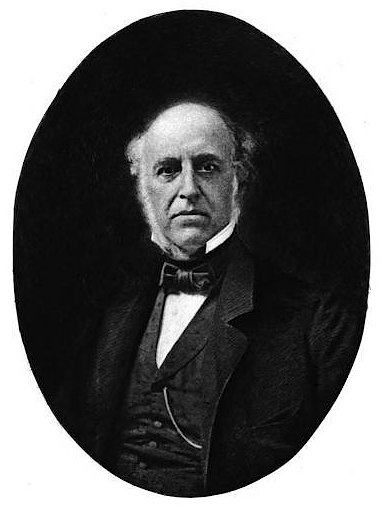
- Born: July 15, 1796; Newton, Massachusetts
- Died: May 27, 1867 (aged 70); Boston, Massachusetts
- Occupations: Banker, writer
- Writing career
- Subjects: Mythology and Fable

Thomas Bulfinch (July 15, 1796 – May 27, 1867) was an American author born in Newton, Massachusetts, known best for Bulfinch's Mythology, a posthumous combination of his three volumes of mythologies.

== Life ==
Bulfinch belonged to a well-educated merchant family of modest means. His father was Charles Bulfinch, the architect of the Massachusetts State House in Boston and parts of the U.S. Capitol in Washington, D.C.

Bulfinch attended Boston Latin School, Phillips Exeter Academy and Harvard College, from which he graduated in 1814. His main career was with the Merchants' Bank of Boston.

== Bulfinch's Mythology ==
Bulfinch published a reorganized version of the biblical book of Psalms to illustrate the history of the Hebrews. However, he is known best as the author of Bulfinch's Mythology, an 1881 compilation of his three previous works:

1. The Age of Fable, or Stories of Gods and Heroes (1855)
2. The Age of Chivalry, or Legends of King Arthur (1858)
3. Legends of Charlemagne, or Romance of the Middle Ages (1863)

Bulfinch's Mythology is a classic work of popularized mythology, the standard for more than a century and still in print. The compilation, assembled posthumously by Edward Everett Hale, includes various stories belonging to the mythological traditions known as the Matter of Rome, the Matter of Britain and the Matter of France, respectively. Bulfinch wrote in his preface:

"Our work is not for the learned, nor for the theologian, nor for the philosopher, but for the reader of English literature, of either sex, who wishes to comprehend the allusions so frequently made by public speakers, lecturers, essayists, and poets, and those which occur in polite conversation."

The original volume was dedicated to Henry Wadsworth Longfellow, and Bulfinch described it on the title page as an "attempt to popularize mythology and extend the enjoyment of elegant literature". In his preface he outlined his purpose, which was

"an attempt to solve this problem, by telling the stories of mythology in such a manner as to make them a source of amusement. We have endeavored to tell them correctly, according to the ancient authorities, so that when the reader finds them referred to he may not be at a loss to recognize the reference. Thus we hope to teach mythology not as a study, but as a relaxation from study; to give our work the charm of a story-book, yet by means of it to impart a knowledge of an important branch of education. The index at the end will adapt it to the purposes of a reference, and make it a Classical Dictionary for the parlor."

His obituary noted that the contents were "expurgated of all that would be offensive".

The versions Bulfinch gives for the classical myths are those in Ovid and Virgil. His Norse myths are abridged from a work by Paul Henri Mallet (1730–1807), a professor at Geneva, translated by Bishop Thomas Percy as Northern Antiquities (London, 1770, often reprinted).

Bulfinch's versions of these myths are still being taught in many American public schools. Marie Sally Cleary, in The Bulfinch Solution: Teaching the Ancient Classics in American Schools (1990), describes the book in the context of "democratizing" classical culture for a wider American antebellum readership. The Bulfinch retellings were largely superseded in American high schools by Edith Hamilton's works on mythology, which were based directly on classical Greek texts.
