= Karine A. Gibbs =

Jamaican American microbiologist and immunologist

- Born: Spanish Town, Jamaica
- Education: Harvard University; Stanford University; University of Washington
- Known for: Study of self-recognition in Proteus mirabilis
- Awards: 100 Inspiring black scientists in America by CellPress, George W. Merck Fellowship, David and Lucile Packard Foundation Fellowship
- Scientific career
- Fields: Microbiology
- Workplaces: Harvard University; University of California, Berkeley

Karine Gibbs is a Jamaican American microbiologist and immunologist and an associate professor in the Department of Plant and Microbial Biology at the University of California, Berkeley. Gibbs’ research merges the fields of sociomicrobiology and bacterial cell biology to explore how the bacterial pathogen Proteus mirabilis, a common gut bacterium which can become pathogenic and cause urinary tract infections, identifies self versus non-self. In 2013, Gibbs and her team were the first to sequence the genome of P. mirabilis BB2000, the model organism for studying self-recognition. In graduate school at Stanford University, Gibbs helped to pioneer the design of a novel tool that allowed for visualization of the movement of bacterial membrane proteins in real time. In 2020, Gibbs was recognized by Cell Press as one of the top 100 Inspiring Black Scientists in America.

== Early life and education ==
Gibbs was born in Jamaica. When she was a child, her family moved to Baltimore, Maryland, where she attended middle school and high school. In high school, Gibbs ran track and field, just as her parents had when they were in high school. In addition to her athletic endeavours, Gibbs also pursued research opportunities in high school. She completed a summer research internship at Villanova University and two summer internships at the U.S. Army Medical Research Institute of Infectious Disease studying viruses.

In 1996, Gibbs pursued her undergraduate degree at Harvard University with an interest in studying microorganisms. Gibbs majored in biochemical sciences and pursued undergraduate research with Roberto Kolter at Harvard Medical School studying biofilms on implants and medical devices. She became second author on a paper exploring the role of nutrient availability in the formation of biofilms. She found that the catabolite repression control protein, which regulates carbon metabolism, is essential for biofilm formation in Pseudomonas aeruginosa. In addition to her research, Gibbs taught science to elementary and middle school students during her undergraduate degree.

After graduating from Harvard in 2000, Gibbs attended Stanford University for her graduate studies in microbiology and immunology. Under the mentorship of Julie Theriot, Gibbs explored the movement of surface proteins within bacterial membranes and on bacterial surface walls. During her PhD, Gibbs collaborated with two other labs at Stanford to develop a novel tool to tag the surface proteins on bacteria while they were living to enable visualization of protein movement within the membrane throughout the microbial life cycle. Her tool is now used today by many labs around the world. Her thesis work utilized this tool to explore the dynamic distribution of LamB, an integral outer membrane protein in E. coli, that is responsible for maltose uptake and attachment of bacteriophages. She found two populations of the LamB protein, one that has restricted mobility and one that has high mobility in the membrane.

After completing her graduate work at Stanford in 2005, Gibbs pursued her postdoctoral work in the Department of Microbiology at the University of Washington in Seattle, Washington. She was mentored by E. Peter Greenberg, and began studying the biofilm forming bacteria, Proteus mirabilis. P. mirabilis forms biofilms on urinary catheters which leads to infections that are often resistant to many antibiotics. Gibbs began exploring the self recognition genes that she hypothesized led to the ability of P. mirabilis to form distinct boundaries between cells of different strains. The study of the ability of bacteria to determine self versus non-self is a very rudimentary form of the ability of immune cells in mammals to detect self versus non-self, and thus Gibbs’ work will lend insight into questions that pertain to humans as well as bacteria. As such, Gibbs explored a set of mutant P. mirabilis in her postdoc that formed boundaries between itself and its parent strain, thus this mutation rendered the bacteria unable to effectively determine self versus non-self. She mapped the loci of these mutations to a six-gene locus that she called Ids for identification of self. She later found that the Ids genes are transcribed as an operon and she located the promoter region of the operon. When swarms of non-self bacteria approached a population of P. mirabilis, expression of the ids operon was increased.

== Career and research ==
In 2010, Gibbs was recruited to Harvard University and was appointed Assistant Professor of Molecular and Cellular Biology in the Department of Molecular and Cellular Biology. In 2015, Gibbs was promoted to Associate Professor. Gibbs has had a passion for teaching since her undergraduate years and thus teaches two classes at Harvard, “The Microbes” and “Social Behaviors and Genetics of Bacteria”. Gibbs is also the principal investigator of the Gibbs Lab where she continue to explore social behaviors in the bacterium P. mirabilis with a focus on how cells determine self versus non-self. Her lab uses genetic techniques to harness the simplicity of P. mirabilis to understand the biological substrates of cell-cell communication, competition, and cooperation. In addition, Gibbs is collaborating with interdisciplinary groups at Harvard to explore the mechanisms of pathogenesis of P. mirabilis, as it is harmless in the gut, but can spread of the kidney and form biofilms on urinary catheters causing infection and disease. Gibbs is also an editor for eLife for the subject area of Microbial and Infectious Disease.

Gibbs was appointed as associate professor at the University of California, Berkeley, in 2021.

=== Cellular self versus non-self recognition ===
In 2013, Gibbs and her colleagues at Harvard were the first to sequence the complete genome of Proteus mirabilis strain BB2000, which is the model system for biological dissection of self-recognition. Gibbs and her colleagues then began to explore the biological mechanisms of self-recognition in P. mirabilis. She found that IdsD and IdsE, two proteins expressed from genes in the Ids operon, seem to encode determinant of strain-specific identity for P. mirabilis and drive sociality within strains of the bacterium. Gibbs and her team later found that IdsD and IdsE proteins derive from different cells within the same strain to mediate communication between cells of the same strain and indicate kinship.

With her expertise in studying P. mirabilis, Gibbs has also guided colleagues in her field by publishing methods on how to use this bacterium to analyze the mechanisms underlying swarm expansion, boundary formation, and territorial exclusion.

== Awards and honors ==
- 2020 Named in 100 Inspiring black scientists in America by CellPress
- 2018 Star Family Challenge for Promising Scientific Research
- 2014 George W. Merck Fellowship
- 2012 David and Lucile Packard Foundation Fellowship for Science and Engineering
- 2010 Selected Scholar for Distinguished Alumni Scholars Day, Stanford University
- 2005 University of Washington Bacterial Pathogenesis Training Grant Postdoctoral Trainee award
- 2005 Professor Sidney Raffel Award, Stanford University
- 2005 Selected Graduate Student to give remarks at Stanford University Commencement
- 2002 ASM Robert D. Watkins Minority Graduate Research Fellow

== Select publications ==
- Sullivan N.L., Septer A.N., Fields A.T., Wenren L.M., and Gibbs K.A.* 2013. The complete genome sequence of strain BB2000 reveals differences from the Proteus mirabilis reference strain. Genome Announcements 1(5). PMID 24009111.
- Wenren L.M., Sullivan N.L., Cardarelli L., Septer A.N., Gibbs K.A.* 2013. Two independent pathways for self-recognition in Proteus mirabilis are linked by type VI-dependent export. mBio 4(4): e00374-13. doi:10.1128/mBio.00374-13. PMID 23882014.
- Gibbs, K.A., L.M. Wenren, and E.P. Greenberg (2011) “Identity Gene Expression in Proteus mirabilis.” J. Bacteriol. 193(13): 3286–3292. PMID 21551301.
- Gibbs, K.A., M.L. Urbanowski and E.P. Greenberg (2008) “Self identity and social recognition in bacteria.” Science. 321(5886): 256–259. PMID 18621670.M
- Gibbs, K.A., D.D. Isaac, J. Xu, R.W. Hendrix, T.J. Silhavy, and J.A. Theriot (2004) “Complex spatial distribution and dynamics of an abundant Escherichia coli outer membrane protein, LamB.” Mol. Microbiol. 53(6): 1771–1783. PMID 15341654.
- Hardy, J., K.P. Francis, M. DeBoer, P. Chu, K. Gibbs, and C.H. Contag (2004) “Extracellular replication of Listeria monocytogenes in the murine gall bladder.” Science 303(5659): 851–853. PMID 14764883.
- O'Toole GA, Gibbs KA, Hager PW, Phibbs PV Jr, Kolter R. The global carbon metabolism regulator Crc is a component of a signal transduction pathway required for biofilm development by Pseudomonas aeruginosa. J Bacteriol. 2000;182(2):425-431. doi:10.1128/jb.182.2.425-431.2000Tipping MJ, Gibbs KA. Biofilms: Managing Stress to Navigate Group Dynamics. Curr Biol. 2020;30(7):R324-R326. doi:10.1016/j.cub.2020.02.045
- Little K, Gibbs KA. Analysis of Proteus mirabilis Social Behaviors on Surfaces. Methods Mol Biol. 2019;2021:45-59. doi:10.1007/978-1-4939-9601-8_6
- Saak CC, Gibbs KA. The Self-Identity Protein IdsD Is Communicated between Cells in Swarming Proteus mirabilis Colonies. J Bacteriol. 2016;198(24):3278-3286. Published 2016 Nov 18. doi:10.1128/JB.00402-16
