= Alice Hamilton =

American physician and toxicologist (1869–1970)

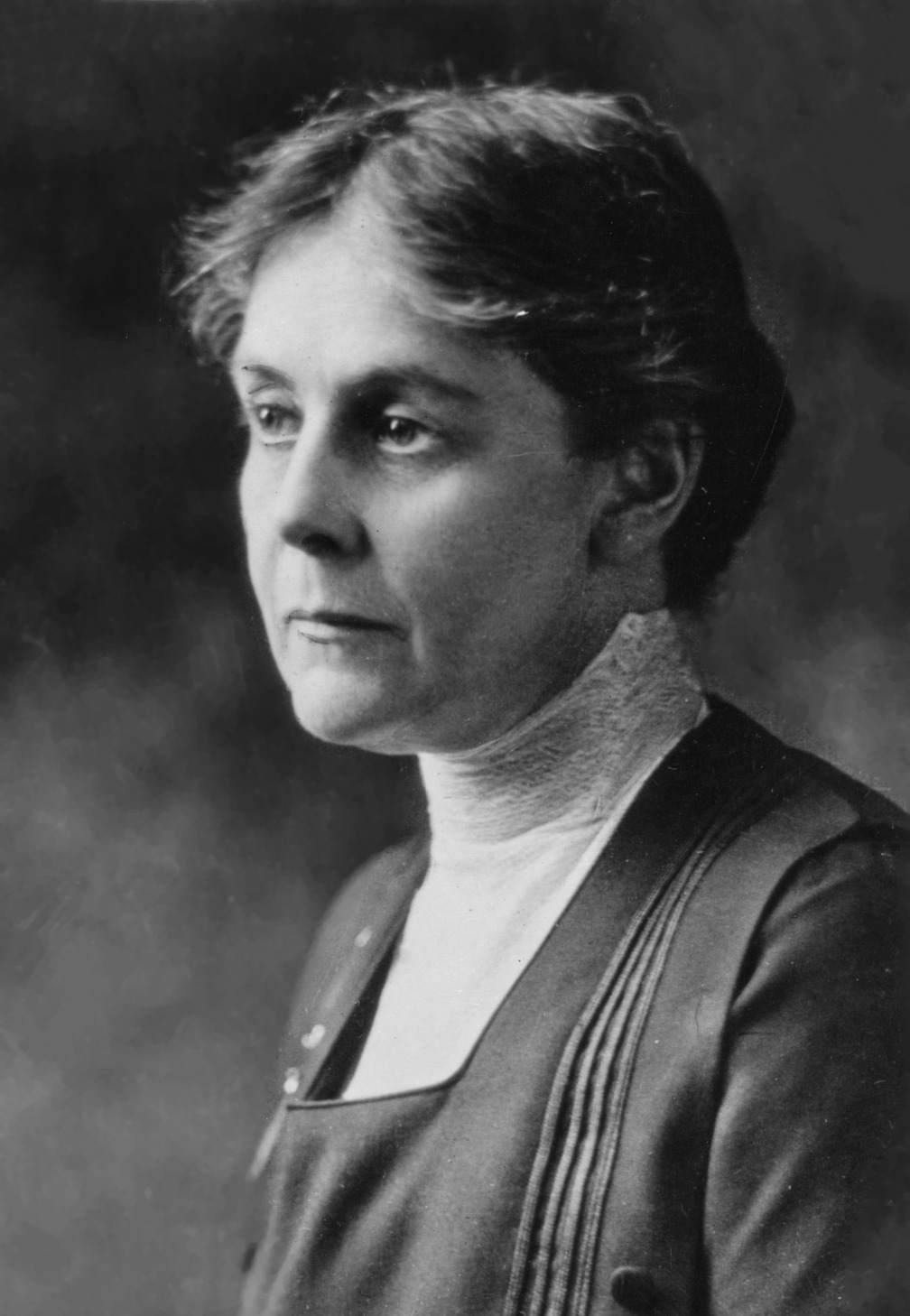
- Born: February 27, 1869; New York City, U.S.
- Died: September 22, 1970 (aged 101); Hadlyme, Connecticut, U.S.
- Education: University of Michigan (1893); Leipzig University, Ludwig-Maximilians-Universität München, and University of Frankfurt am Main (1895); Johns Hopkins University (1897); University of Chicago (1899–1901)
- Awards: Albert Lasker Public Service Award (1947)
- Scientific career
- Fields: Occupational health, industrial toxicology
- Workplaces: Hull House; Woman's Medical School of Northwestern University; Memorial Institute for Infectious Diseases; Harvard Medical School
- Doctoral advisor: Cara Lener
- Other academic advisors: Simon Flexner

Alice Hamilton (February 27, 1869 – September 22, 1970) was an American physician, research scientist, and author. She was a leading expert in the field of occupational health, laid the foundation for health and safety protections, and a pioneer in the field of industrial toxicology. She led efforts to reduce lead poisoning.

Hamilton trained at the University of Michigan Medical School. Her residency at Hull House in Chicago from 1897 to 1919 put her in contact with an extensive demographic of working-class households, and the work-life dangers they faced. She also became a professor of pathology at the Woman's Medical School of Northwestern University in 1897. In 1919, she became the first woman appointed to the faculty of Harvard University.

Her scientific research focused on the study of occupational illnesses and the dangerous effects of industrial metals and chemical compounds. In addition to her scientific work, Hamilton was a social-welfare reformer, humanitarian, and peace activist. She received numerous honors and awards, including the Albert Lasker Public Service Award. Her work led to improvements in safety and regulation, and is sometimes credited with leading to the founding of the United States' Occupational Safety and Health Administration.

== Early life and family ==
Hamilton, the second child of Montgomery Hamilton (1843–1909) and Gertrude (née Pond) Hamilton (1840–1917), was born on February 27, 1869, in Manhattan, New York City, New York. She spent a sheltered childhood among an extended family in Fort Wayne, Indiana, where her grandfather, Allen Hamilton, an Irish immigrant, had settled in 1823. He married Emerine Holman, the daughter of Indiana Supreme Court Justice Jesse Lynch Holman, in 1828 and became a successful Fort Wayne businessman and a land speculator. Much of the city of Fort Wayne was built on land that he once owned. Alice grew up on the Hamilton family's large estate that encompassed a three-block area of downtown Fort Wayne. The Hamilton family also spent many summers at Mackinac Island, Michigan. For the most part, the second and third generations of the extended Hamilton family, which included Alice's family, as well as her uncles, aunts, and cousins, lived on inherited wealth.

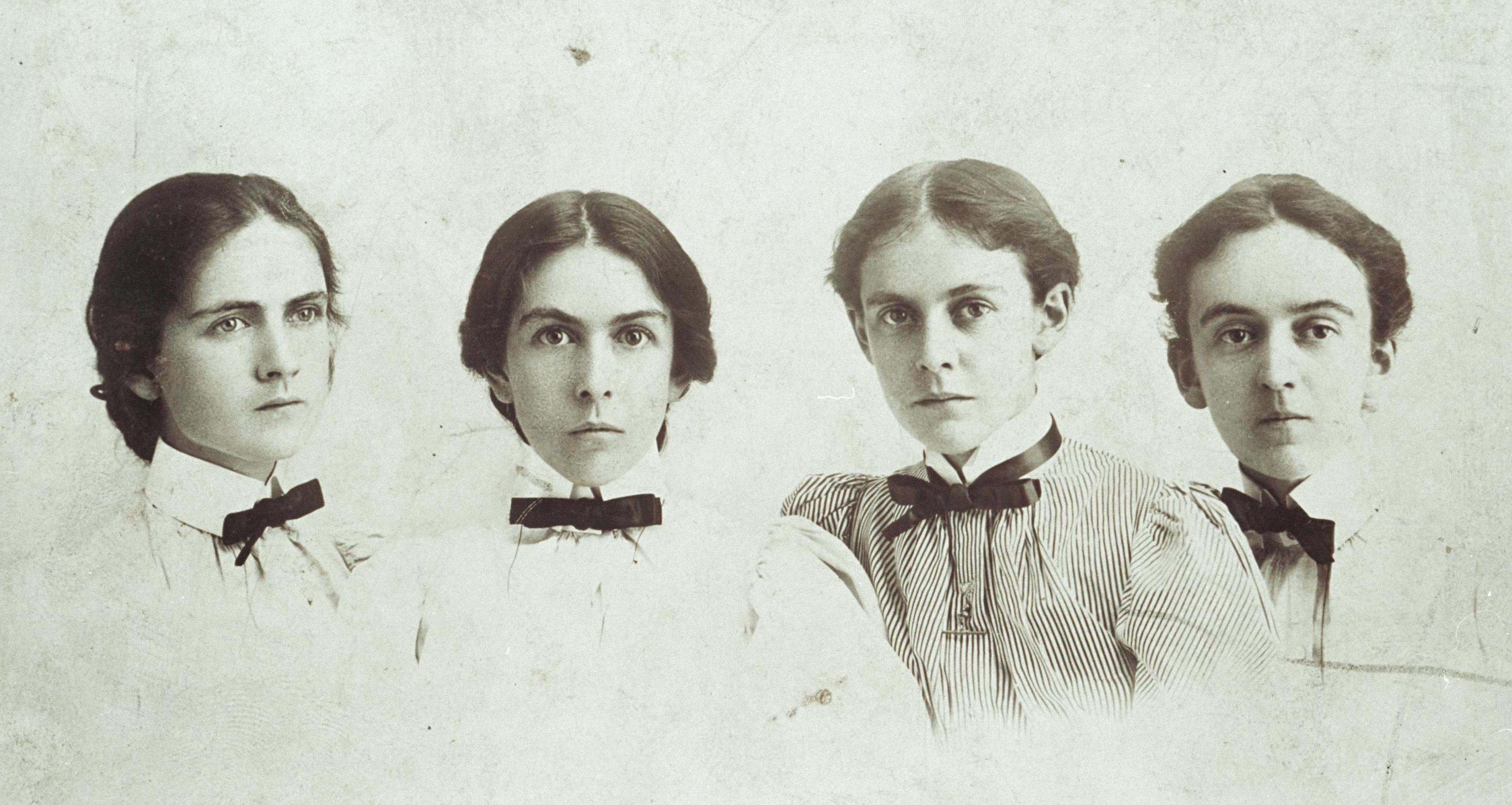
The Hamilton sisters: Edith, Alice, Margaret, and Norah

Montgomery Hamilton, Alice's father, attended Princeton University and Harvard Law School. He also studied in Germany, where he met Gertrude Pond, the daughter of a wealthy sugar importer. They were married in 1866. Alice's father became a partner in a wholesale grocery business in Fort Wayne, but the partnership dissolved in 1885 and he withdrew from public life. Although the business failure caused a financial loss for the family, Alice's outspoken mother, Gertrude, remained socially active in the Fort Wayne community.

Alice was the second eldest of five siblings that included three sisters (Edith, Margaret, and Norah) and a brother (Arthur "Quint"), all of whom were accomplished in their respective fields. The girls remained especially close throughout their childhood and into their professional careers. Edith (1867–1963), an educator and headmistress at Bryn Mawr School in Baltimore, became a classicist and renowned author for her essays and best-selling books on ancient Greek and Roman civilizations, including the classic introductory text Mythology. Margaret (1871–1969), like her older sister Edith, became an educator and headmistress at Bryn Mawr School. Norah (1873–1945) was an artist, living and working at Hull House. Arthur (1886–1967), the youngest Hamilton sibling, became a writer, professor of Spanish, and assistant dean for foreign students at the University of Illinois at Urbana-Champaign. Arthur was the only sibling to marry; he and his wife, Mary (Neal) Hamilton, had no children.

== Education ==
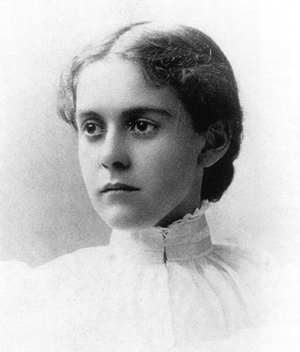
Hamilton in 1893 (age 24), her year of graduation from the University of Michigan Medical School

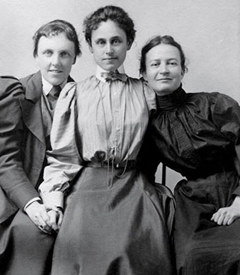
Theodate Pope, Alice Hamilton, and a student believed to be Agnes Hamilton, 1888. Courtesy of Miss Porter's School.

Hamilton's parents homeschooled their children from an early age. Following a family tradition among the Hamilton women, Alice completed her early education at Miss Porter's Finishing School for Young Ladies (also known as Miss Porter's School) in Farmington, Connecticut, from 1886 to 1888. In addition to Alice, three of her aunts, three cousins, and all three of her sisters were alumnae of the school.

Although Hamilton had led a privileged life in Fort Wayne, she aspired to provide some type of useful service to the world and chose medicine as a way to financially support herself. Hamilton, who was an avid reader, also cited literary influence for inspiring her to become a physician, even though she had not yet received any training in the sciences: "I meant to be a medical missionary to Teheran, having been fascinated by the description of Persia in [Edmond] O'Donovan's The Merv Oasis. I doubted if I could ever be good enough to be a real missionary, but if I could care for the sick, that would do instead."

After her return to Indiana from school in Connecticut, Hamilton studied science with a high school teacher in Fort Wayne and anatomy at Fort Wayne College of Medicine for a year before enrolling at the University of Michigan Medical School in 1892. There she had the opportunity of studying with "a remarkable group of men" – John Jacob Abel (pharmacology), William Henry Howell (physiology), Frederick George Novy (bacteriology), Victor C. Vaughan (biochemistry) and George Dock (medicine). During her last year of study she served on Dr. Dock's staff, going on rounds, taking histories and doing clinical laboratory work. Hamilton earned a medical degree from the university in 1893.

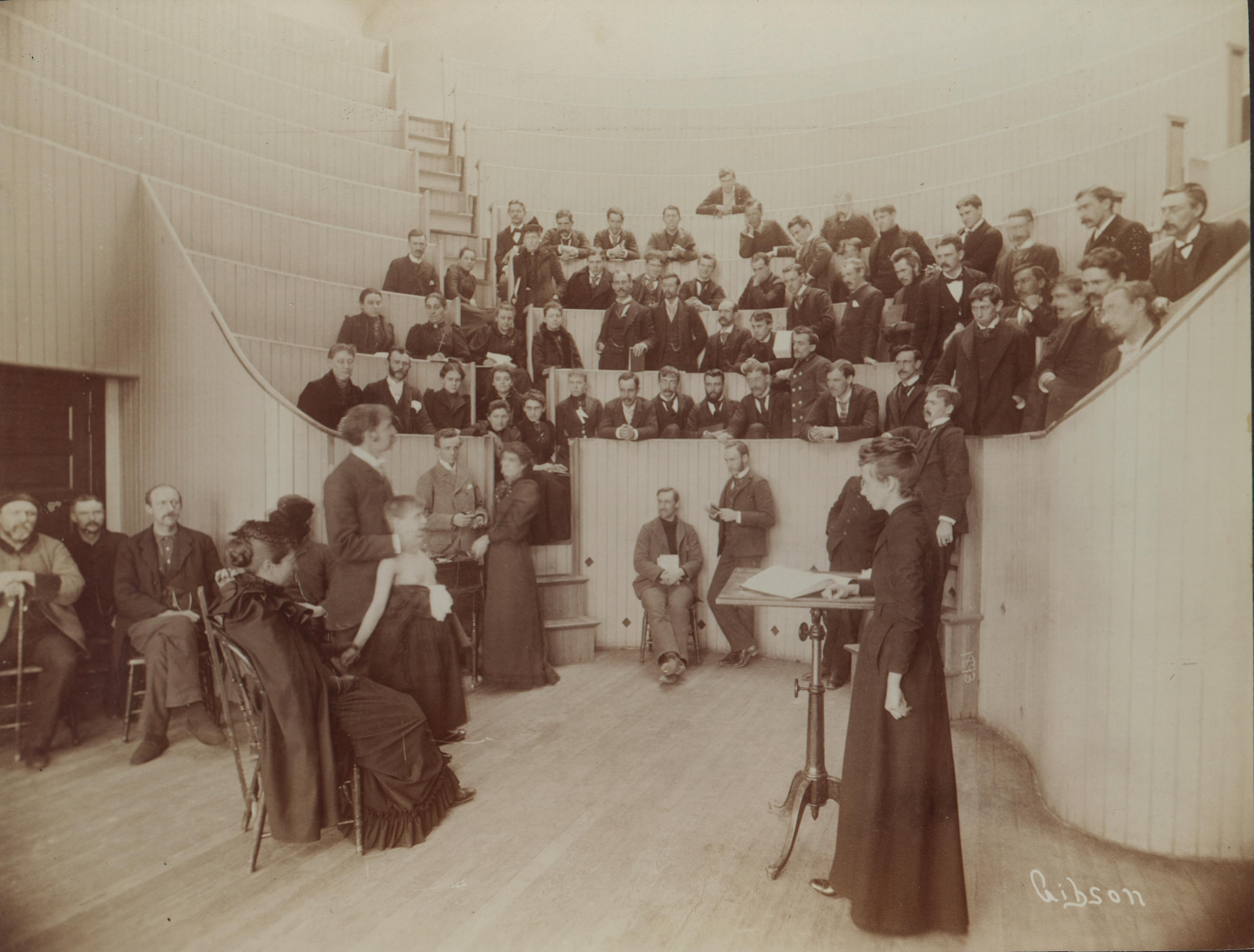
Alice Hamilton in an anatomy class, ca. 1893

In 1893–94, after graduation from medical school, Hamilton completed internships at the Northwestern Hospital for Women and Children in Minneapolis and at the New England Hospital for Women and Children in Roxbury, a suburban neighborhood of Boston, Massachusetts, to gain some clinical experience. Hamilton had already decided that she was not interested in establishing a medical practice and returned to the University of Michigan in February 1895 to study bacteriology as a resident graduate and lab assistant of Frederick George Novy. She also began to develop an interest in public health.

In the fall of 1895, Alice and her older sister, Edith, traveled to Germany. Alice planned to study bacteriology and pathology at the advice of her professors at the University of Michigan, while Edith intended to study the classics and attend lectures. The Hamilton sisters faced some opposition to their efforts to study abroad. Although Alice was welcomed at the University of Frankfurt am Main, her requests to study at the Friedrich Wilhelm University of Berlin were rejected and she experienced some prejudice against women when the two sisters studied at the Ludwig-Maximilians-Universität München and Leipzig University.

When Alice returned to the United States in September 1896, she continued postgraduate studies for a year at the Johns Hopkins University Medical School. There she worked with Simon Flexner on pathological anatomy. She also had the opportunity to learn from William H. Welch and William Osler.

== Career ==
=== Early years at Chicago's Hull House ===
In 1897 Hamilton accepted an offer to become a professor of pathology at the Woman's Medical School of Northwestern University. Soon after her move to Chicago, Illinois, Hamilton fulfilled a longtime ambition to become a member and resident of Hull House, the settlement house founded by social reformer Jane Addams and Ellen Gates Starr. While Hamilton taught and did research at the medical school during the day, she maintained an active life at Hull House, her full-time residence from 1897 to 1919. On how Hull House had helped Hamilton to find her true self she said; It "satisfied every longing, for companionship, for the excitement of new experiences, for constant intellectual stimulation, and for the sense of being caught up in a big movement which enlisted my enthusiastic loyalty." Hamilton became Jane Addams' personal physician and volunteered her time at Hull House to teach English and art. She also directed the men's fencing and athletic clubs, operated a well-baby clinic, and visited the sick in their homes. Other inhabitants of Hull House included Alice's sister Norah, and her friends Rachelle and Victor Yarros. Although Hamilton moved away from Chicago in 1919 when she accepted a position as an assistant professor at Harvard Medical School, she returned to Hull House and stayed for several months each spring until Jane Addams's death in 1935.

Through her association and work at Hull House and living side by side with the poor residents of the community, Hamilton witnessed the effects that the dangerous trades had on workers' health through exposure to carbon monoxide and lead poisoning. As a result, she became increasingly interested in the problems the workers faced, especially occupational injuries and illnesses. The experience also caused Hamilton to begin considering how to merge her interests in medical science and social reform to improve the health of American workers.

When the Woman's Medical School closed in 1902, Hamilton took a position as bacteriologist with the Memorial Institute for Infectious Diseases, working with Ludvig Hektoen. During this time, she also formed a friendship with bacteriologist Ruth Tunnicliffe. Hamilton investigated a typhoid epidemic in Chicago before focusing her research on the investigation of industrial diseases. Some of Hamilton's early research in this area included attempts to identify causes of typhoid and tuberculosis in the community surrounding Hull House. Her work on typhoid in 1902 led to the replacement of the chief sanitary inspector of the area by the Chicago Board of Health. Additionally, her 1905 study of respiratory diseases like scarlet fever placed her among the first health experts to advise doctors to wear face masks to prevent the spread of airborne viruses.

The study of industrial medicine (work-related illnesses) had become increasingly important because the Industrial Revolution of the late nineteenth century had led to new dangers in the workplace. In 1907, Hamilton began exploring existing literature from abroad. While many European countries were quick to redress industrial poisonings through research and legislative and procedural reform, America lagged behind for decades, with many American medical circles considering industrial hygiene "a subject tainted with Socialism or with feminine sentimentality for the poor". She set out to change the situation and published her first article on the topic in 1908.

=== Medical investigator ===
Hamilton began her long career in public health and workplace safety in 1910, when Illinois governor Charles S. Deneen appointed her as a medical investigator to the newly formed Illinois Commission on Occupational Diseases. Hamilton led the commission's investigations, which focused on industrial poisons such as lead and other toxins. She also authored the "Illinois Survey," the commission's report that documented its findings of industrial processes that exposed workers to lead poisoning and other illnesses. She discovered over seventy industrial processes through which workers became exposed to lead poisoning. In addition, she uncovered occupations, such as polishing cut glass and wrapping cigars in "tinfoil," that exhibited increased exposure to lead poisoning, contrary to the public's beliefs. The commission's efforts resulted in the passage of the first workers' compensation laws in Illinois in 1911, in Indiana in 1915, and occupational disease laws in other states. The new laws required employers to take safety precautions to protect workers.

By 1916 Hamilton had become America's foremost authority on lead poisoning. For the next decade she investigated a range of issues for a variety of state and federal health committees. Hamilton focused her explorations on occupational toxic disorders, examining the effects of substances such as aniline dyes, carbon monoxide, mercury, tetraethyl lead, radium, benzene, carbon disulfide and hydrogen sulfide gases. In 1925, at a Public Health Service conference on the use of lead in gasoline, she testified against the use of lead and warned of the danger it posed to people and the environment. Nevertheless, leaded gasoline was allowed. The EPA in 1988 estimated that over the previous 60 years, 68 million children suffered high toxic exposure to lead from leaded fuels.

Her work on the manufacture of white lead and lead oxide, as a special investigator for the U.S. Bureau of Labor Statistics, is considered a "landmark study." Relying primarily on "shoe leather epidemiology" (her process of making personal visits to factories, conducting interviews with workers, and compiling details of diagnosed poisoning cases) and the emerging laboratory science of toxicology, Hamilton pioneered occupational epidemiology and industrial hygiene. She also created the specialized field of industrial medicine in the United States. Her findings were scientifically persuasive and influenced sweeping health reforms that changed laws and general practice to improve the health of workers.

During World War I, the US Army tasked her with solving a mysterious ailment striking workers at a munitions plant in New Jersey. She led a team that included George Minot, a professor at Harvard Medical School. She deduced that the workers were being sickened through contact with the explosive trinitrotoluene (TNT). She recommended that workers wear protective clothing to be removed and washed at the end of each shift, solving the problem.

Hamilton's best-known research included her studies on carbon monoxide poisoning among American steelworkers, mercury poisoning of hatters, and "a debilitating hand condition developed by workers using jackhammers." At the request of the U.S. Department of Labor, she also investigated industries involved in developing high explosives, "spastic anemia known as 'dead fingers'" among Bedford, Indiana, limestone cutters, and the "unusually high incidence of pulmonary tuberculosis" among tombstone carvers working in the granite mills of Quincy, Massachusetts, and Barre, Vermont. Hamilton was also a member of the Committee for the Scientific Investigation of the Mortality from Tuberculosis in Dusty Trades, whose efforts "laid the groundwork for further studies and eventual widespread reform in the industry."

=== Women's rights and peace activist ===
During her years at Hull House, Hamilton was active in the women's rights and peace movements. She traveled with Jane Addams and Emily Greene Balch to the 1915 International Congress of Women in The Hague, where they met Aletta Jacobs, a Dutch pacifist, feminist, and suffragist. She also visited German-occupied Belgium.

Hamilton returned to Europe with Addams in May 1919 to attend the second International Congress of Women at Zürich, Switzerland. In addition, Hamilton, Addams, Jacobs, and American Quaker Carolena M. Wood became involved in a humanitarian mission to Germany to distribute food aid and investigate reports of famine.

=== Assistant professor, Harvard Medical School ===
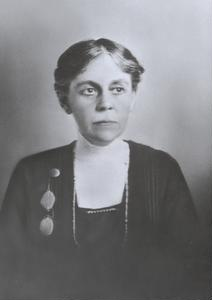
Alice Hamilton during her first year at Harvard, 1919

In January 1919, Hamilton accepted a position as assistant professor in a newly formed Department of Industrial Medicine (and after 1925 the School of Public Health) at Harvard Medical School, making her the first woman appointed to the Harvard University faculty in any field. Her appointment was hailed by the New York Tribune with the headline: "A Woman on Harvard Faculty—The Last Citadel Has Fallen—The Sex Has Come Into Its Own". She commented, "yes, I am the first woman on the Harvard faculty—but not the first one who should have been appointed!"

During her years at Harvard, from 1919 to her retirement in 1935, Hamilton never received a faculty promotion and held only a series of three-year appointments. At her request, the half-time appointments for which she taught one semester per year allowed her to continue her research and spend several months of each year at Hull House. Hamilton also faced discrimination as a woman. She was excluded from social activities, could not enter the Harvard Union, attend the Faculty Club, or receive a quota of football tickets. In addition, Hamilton was not allowed to march in the university's commencement ceremonies as the male faculty members did.

Hamilton became a successful fundraiser for Harvard as she continued to write and conduct research on the dangerous trades. In addition to publishing "landmark reports for the U.S. Department of Labor" on research related to workers in Arizona copper mines and stonecutters at Indiana's limestone quarries, Hamilton also wrote Industrial Poisons in the United States (1925), the first American textbook on the subject, and another related textbook, Industrial Toxicology (1934).

Hamilton was a prominent critic of adding tetraethyl lead to gasoline. At a tetraethyl lead conference in Washington, D.C. in 1925 summoned by Surgeon General Hugh S. Cumming and attended by industry and public health officials, she rallied public health experts in opposing leaded gasoline's production, warning of the potential risks to worker health and environmental repercussions. Hamilton was appointed to the Surgeon General's subsequent investigatory panel as the sole voice of scientific expertise among seven industry men. Given only seven months to investigate the impact of leaded gasoline, the panel was unable to verify the long-term consequences of exposure and hesitantly approved its use in its final report.

Hamilton also remained an activist in social reform efforts. Her specific interests in civil liberties, peace, birth control, and protective labor legislation for women caused some of her critics to consider her a "radical" and a "subversive." From 1924 to 1930, she served as the only woman member of the League of Nations Health Committee. She also visited the Soviet Union in 1924 and Nazi Germany in April 1933. Hamilton wrote "The Youth Who Are Hitler's Strength," which was published in The New York Times. The article described Nazi exploitation of youth in the years between the two world wars. She also criticized the Nazi education, especially its domestic training for girls.

== Later years ==
After her retirement from Harvard in 1935, Hamilton became a medical consultant to the U.S. Division of Labor Standards, and she maintained her connections at Harvard as professor emerita. Her last field survey, which was made in 1937–38, investigated the viscose rayon industry. In addition, Hamilton served as president of the National Consumers League from 1944 to 1949.

Hamilton spent her retirement years in Hadlyme, Connecticut, at the home she had purchased in 1916 with her sister, Margaret. Hamilton remained an active writer in retirement. Her autobiography, Exploring the Dangerous Trades, was published in 1943. Hamilton and coauthor Harriet Louise Hardy also revised Industrial Toxicology (1949), the textbook that Hamilton had initially written in 1934. Hamilton enjoyed leisure activities such as reading, sketching, and writing, as well as spending time among her family and friends.

== Death and legacy ==
Hamilton died of a stroke at her home in Hadlyme, Connecticut, on September 22, 1970, at the age of 101. She is buried at Cove Cemetery in Hadlyme.

Hamilton was a tireless researcher and crusader against the use of toxic substances in the workplace. Within three months of her death in 1970, the U.S. Congress passed the Occupational Safety and Health Act to improve workplace safety in the United States.

== Recognition and awards ==
- Hamilton was awarded honorary degrees from the University of Michigan, Mount Holyoke College, and Smith College.
- She was included in the American Men in Science: A Biographical Dictionary (1906).
- In 1935 Eleanor Roosevelt presented Hamilton with the Chi Omega women's fraternity's National Achievement Award.
- In 1947 Hamilton became the first woman to receive the Albert Lasker Public Service Award for her public service contributions.
- In 1948 Hamilton received the Donald E. Cummings Memorial Awards from the American Industrial Hygiene Association (AIHA). In 1993, the AIHA established an award in her honor to recognize the contributions of outstanding women in the field of occupational and environmental hygiene.
- In 1956 she was named TIME magazine's "Woman of the Year" in medicine.
- In 1973 Hamilton was posthumously inducted into the National Women's Hall of Fame.
- On February 27, 1987, the National Institute for Occupational Safety and Health dedicated its research facility as the Alice Hamilton Laboratory for Occupational Safety and Health. The institute also began giving an annual Alice Hamilton Award to recognize excellent scientific research in the field.
- In 1995 the U.S. Postal Service honored Hamilton's contributions to public health with a 55-cent commemorative postage stamp in its Great Americans series.
- In 2000 the city of Fort Wayne, Indiana, erected statues of Alice, her sister, Edith, and their cousin, Agnes, in the city's Headwaters Park.
- On September 21, 2002, the American Chemical Society designated Hamilton and her work in industrial toxicology a National Historic Chemical Landmark in recognition of her pioneering role in the development of occupational medicine.
- Hamilton has been heralded as a pioneering female environmentalist. The Division of Occupational and Environmental Medicine at the University of California, San Francisco, sponsors an annual lecture named in recognition of her achievements in these areas. Since 1997 the American Society for Environmental History has annually awarded the Alice Hamilton Prize for the best article published outside the Environmental History journal.
- On September 26, 2018, one bust of Alice Hamilton was placed in the foyer of the François-Xavier Bagnoud Building of the Harvard T.H. Chan School of Public Health, and another bust, also by local sculptor Robert Shure, was placed in the Atrium in the Tosteson Medical Education Center of the Harvard Medical School.
- Annually, the Harvard T.H. Chan School of Public Health's Committee on the Advancement of Women Faculty (CAWF) sponsors the annual Alice Hamilton lecture and award to recognize especially promising junior faculty women.

== Selected published works ==
Books:

- Industrial Poisons in the United States (1925)
- Industrial Toxicology (1934' rev. 1949)
- Exploring the Dangerous Trades: The Autobiography of Alice Hamilton, M.D. (1943).

Articles:

- "Hitler Speaks: His Book Reveals the Man," Atlantic Monthly (April 1933)
- "The Youth Who Are Hitler's Strength," New York Times, 1933
- "A Woman of Ninety Looks at Her World," Atlantic Monthly (1961)
