= Linda Lange =

Bacteriologist

Linda Bartels Lange (January 15, 1882 – April 24, 1947) was an American bacteriologist known for her study of cancer, tuberculosis, and infectious diseases.

== Early life and education ==
Lange was born in New York City on January 15, 1882. She attended Bryn Mawr College and Goucher College for her undergraduate studies, and received her MD from Johns Hopkins University in 1911.

== Career and research ==
Before earning her MD, Lange was an assistant at the Bryn Mawr School. She completed her internship at the New York Infirmary for Women and Children upon receiving her MD. From 1912 to 1914, she was a bacteriology and pathology fellow at the Rockefeller Institute. After her fellowship, she was a pathologist and the director of H.A. Kelly Hospital in Baltimore, Maryland for a year. From 1915 to 1916, she taught pathology at the University of Wisconsin medical school, and then returned to her alma mater to teach from 1916 to 1919. She then moved to the school of hygiene and public health, where she was an instructor from 1919 to 1927 and an associate professor for the following decade. The last years of her career were spent at the Woman's Medical College of Pennsylvania; Lange retired in 1940.
