= Mythology (book) =

1942 Edith Hamilton textbook

Mythology: Timeless Tales of Gods and Heroes
- First edition
- Author: Edith Hamilton
- Illustrator: Steele Savage
- Subject: Greek mythology, Roman mythology, and Norse mythology
- Publisher: Little, Brown and Company
- Publication date: 1942
- Pages: xiv, 497 pages

Mythology: Timeless Tales of Gods and Heroes is a book written by Edith Hamilton, published in 1942 by Little, Brown and Company. It has been reissued since then by several publishers, including its 75th anniversary illustrated edition. It retells stories of Greek, Roman, and Norse mythology drawn from a variety of sources. The introduction includes commentary on the major classical poets used as sources, and on how changing cultures have led to changing characterizations of the deities and their myths.

== Contents ==
The book contains an introduction and 7 sections:

1. Greek gods of Olympus and the Greek creation myths
2. Greek and Roman myths involving love and adventure, including the tales of Eros and Psyche and Jason's quest for the Golden Fleece
3. Heroes before the Trojan War, such as Perseus, Theseus, Heracles and Atalanta
4. Trojan War and its heroes, including Odysseus, Aeneas and Achilles
5. Significant families in Greek mythology: the house of Atreus, the royal house of Thebes, and the royal house of Athens
6. Lesser-known stories from Greek and Roman mythology
7. Tales from Norse myths involving deities such as Odin, Thor and Loki

Most editions include drawings by American illustrator Steele Savage.
