= Margaret Hamilton (educator) =

Teacher (1871–1969)

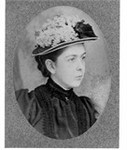
Hamilton in the 1890s

Margaret Hamilton (June 13, 1871 – July 6, 1969) was an educator and headmistress at Bryn Mawr School, Maryland, United States.

== Early life ==
Hamilton was born on June 13, 1871, in Fort Wayne, Indiana, the daughter of Gertrude Pond (1840–1917) and Montgomery Hamilton (1843–1909). Her older sister Edith Hamilton (1867–1963) was an internationally-known author who was one of the most renowned classicists of her era; Alice Hamilton (1869–1970) was one of the founders of industrial medicine; Norah Hamilton (1873–1945) was an artist; Arthur Hamilton (1886–1967) was a writer, professor of Spanish, and assistant dean for foreign students at the University of Illinois at Urbana-Champaign. Alice says of Margaret "Margaret is two and half years younger than I, but because she was the only one of us who had ill health as a child, she did not seem really younger."

She grew up in Fort Wayne, and worked in its first library, the Women's Reading Room.

Hamilton attended Miss Porter's School in Farmington, Connecticut, and graduated in 1890. From 1893 to 1897 she attended Bryn Mawr College, Philadelphia. She obtained a bachelor's degree in Biology and Chemistry in 1897. She was elected European fellow for the academic year 1897-8. In 1899 Hamilton studied biology in Paris and Munich and, back in the United States, anatomy at Johns Hopkins University. Her target to become a physician was interrupted when she was involved in a carriage accident while at Johns Hopkins. She was severely injured and remained slightly lame for the rest of her life.

== Career ==
In 1900 Hamilton was back home to Fort Wayne, where she took care of her younger 4-year-old brother, Arthur, and then joined the faculty at Bryn Mawr School, Baltimore, as Science teacher. In 1907 she became Associate Head Mistress to her sister Edith. From 1910 to 1933 she was Head of the Primary School. She was Headmistress of the entire School from 1933 to 1935.

== Personal life ==
Clara Landsberg, a close colleague and longtime family friend, studied in Europe with Margaret Hamilton for a summer in 1899 and was to become her lifetime companion. The daughter of a Reform rabbi from Rochester, New York, and a graduate of Bryn Mawr College, Landsberg became a resident at Hull House, where she was in charge of its evening education programs and shared a room with Alice Hamilton. Landsberg eventually left Hull House to teach Latin at Bryn Mawr School, where Edith Hamilton was headmistress. Margaret Hamilton also became a teacher at Bryn Mawr School and took over as headmistress before retiring in 1935. Alice Hamilton considered Landsberg part of the Hamilton family, one remarked, "I could not think of a life in which Clara did not have a great part, she has become part of my life almost as if she were one of us."

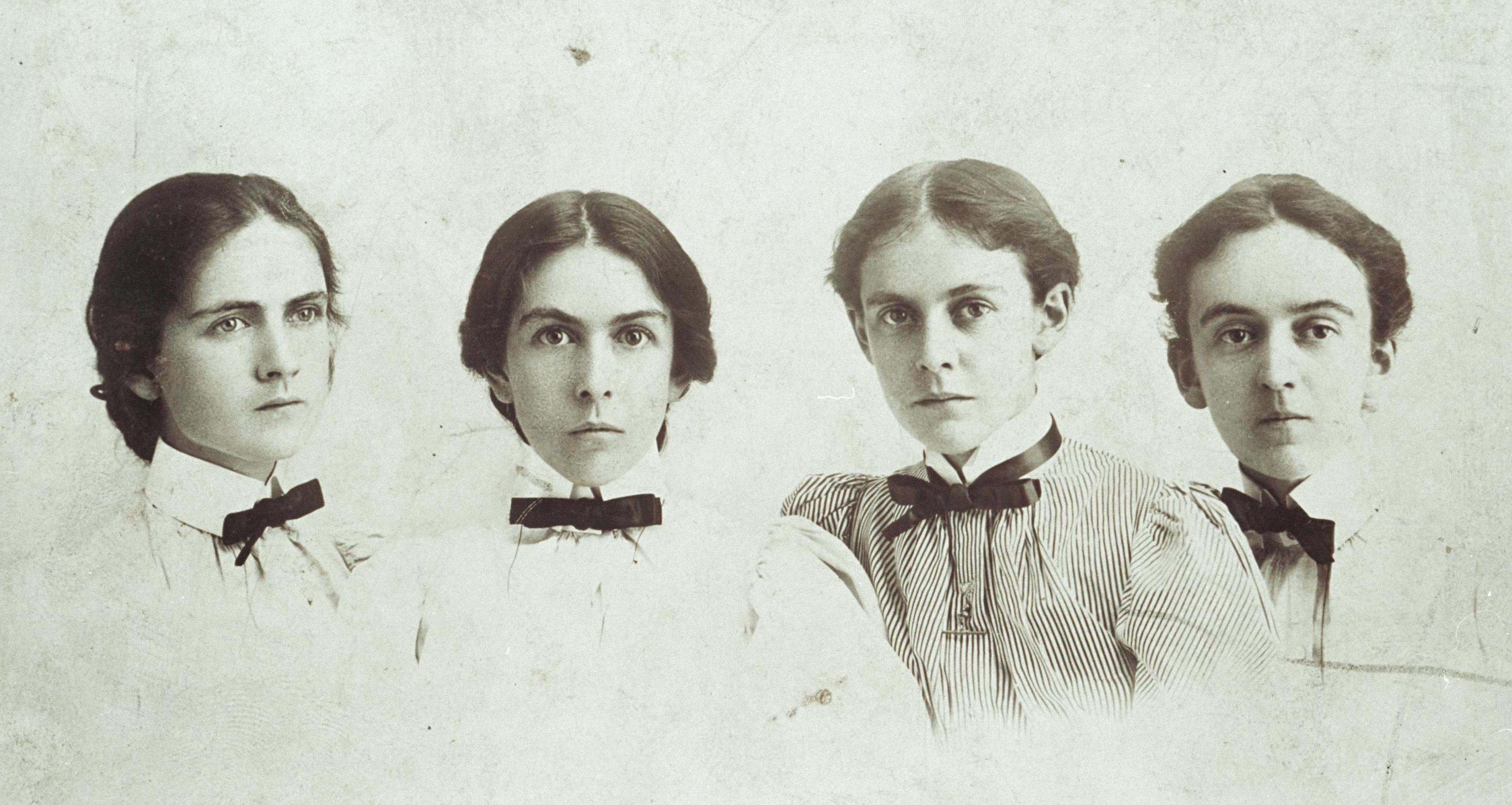
The Hamilton sisters: Edith, Alice, Margaret and Norah

The Hamilton sisters, their mother, Edith's companion, Doris Fielding Reid, and Landsberg, spent their retirement years in Hadlyme, Connecticut, at the house they purchased in 1916. The house was near Miss Porter's School in Farmington, Connecticut, that all four of the Hamilton sisters had attended.

Margaret Hamilton was the head of the household and managed the finances. With her sister Alice, she traveled to Morocco, Spain and Guatemala.

Hamilton died on July 6, 1969. She is buried with Landsberg at Cove Cemetery in Hadlyme, Connecticut, in the same cemetery as Hamilton's mother (Gertrude) and her sisters (Alice, Norah, and Edith), and Edith's life partner, Doris Fielding Reid.
