= Edith Hamilton =

American teacher and writer (1867–1963)

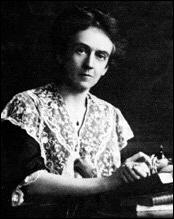
- Hamilton c. 1897
- Born: August 12, 1867; Dresden, North German Confederation
- Died: May 31, 1963 (aged 95); Washington, D.C.
- Education: Bryn Mawr College
- Occupations: Classical scholar; author; educator
- Writing career
- Period: 1930–1957
- Subjects: Ancient Greece; Greek philosophy Mythology
- Notable works: The Greek Way, The Roman Way, The Prophets of Israel, Mythology

Edith Hamilton (August 12, 1867 – May 31, 1963) was an American educator and internationally known author who was one of the most renowned classicists of her era in the United States. A graduate of Bryn Mawr College, she also studied in Germany at Leipzig University and the Ludwig-Maximilians-Universität München. Hamilton began her career as an educator and head of the Bryn Mawr School, a private college preparatory school for girls in Baltimore, Maryland; however, Hamilton is best known for her essays and best-selling books on ancient Greek and Roman civilizations.

Hamilton's second career as an author began after she retired from the Bryn Mawr School in 1922. She was sixty-two years old when her first book, The Greek Way, was published in 1930. It was an immediate success and a featured selection by the Book-of-the-Month Club in 1957. Hamilton's other notable works include The Roman Way (1932), The Prophets of Israel (1936), Mythology (1942), and The Echo of Greece (1957).

Critics have acclaimed Hamilton's books for their lively interpretations of ancient cultures. She is described as the classical scholar who "brought into clear and brilliant focus the Golden Age of Greek life and thought ... with Homeric power and simplicity in her style of writing". Her works are said to influence modern lives through a "realization of the refuge and strength in the past" to those "in the troubled present." Hamilton's younger sister was Alice Hamilton, an expert in industrial toxicology and the first woman appointed to the faculty of Harvard University.

== Early life and education ==
=== Childhood and family ===
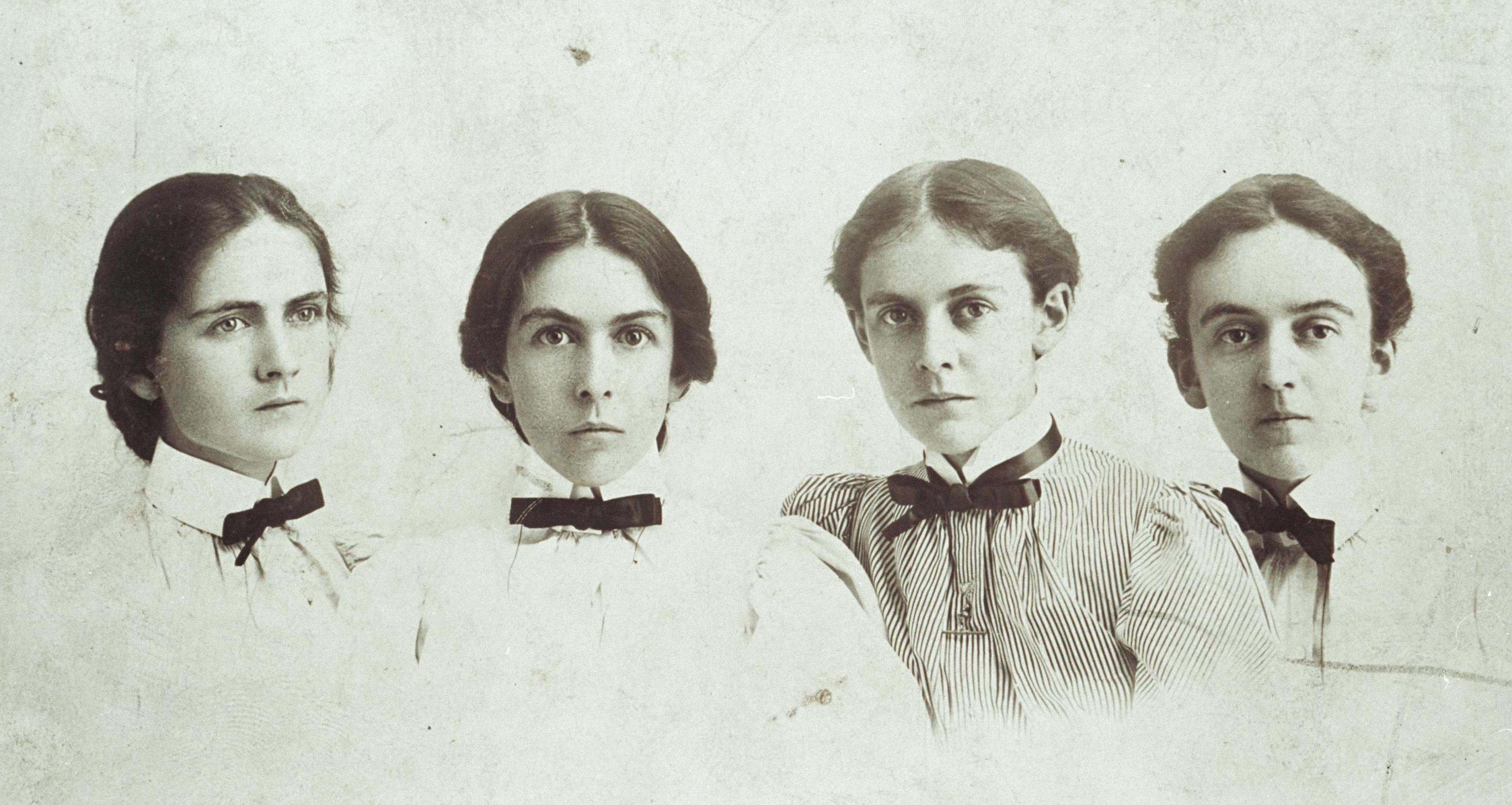
The Hamilton sisters: Edith, Alice, Margaret and Norah

Edith Hamilton, the eldest child of American parents Gertrude Pond (1840–1917) and Montgomery Hamilton (1843–1909), was born on August 12, 1867, in Dresden, Germany. Shortly after her birth, the Hamilton family returned to the United States and made their home in Fort Wayne, Indiana, where Edith's grandfather, Allen Hamilton, had settled in the early 1820s. Edith spent her youth among her extended family in Fort Wayne.

Edith's grandfather, Allen Hamilton, was an Irish immigrant who came to Indiana in 1823 by way of Canada and settled in Fort Wayne. In 1828 he married Emerine Holman, the daughter of Indiana Supreme Court Justice Jesse Lynch Holman. Allen Hamilton became a successful Fort Wayne businessman and a land speculator. Much of the city of Fort Wayne was built on land he once owned. The Hamilton family's large estate on a three-block area of downtown Fort Wayne included three homes. The family also built a home at Mackinac Island, Michigan, where they spent many of their summers. For the most part, the second and third generations of the extended Hamilton family, which included Edith's family, as well as her uncles, aunts, and cousins, lived on inherited wealth.

Montgomery Hamilton, a scholarly man of leisure, was one of Allen and Emerine (Holman) Hamilton's eleven children; however, only five of the siblings lived. Her father attended Princeton University and Harvard Law School and also studied in Germany. Montgomery met Gertrude Pond, the daughter of a wealthy Wall Street broker and sugar importer, while living in Germany. They were married in 1866. Montgomery Hamilton became a partner in a wholesale grocery business in Fort Wayne, but the partnership dissolved in 1885 and the business failure caused a financial loss for the family. Afterwards, Montgomery Hamilton retreated from public life. Edith's mother, Gertrude, who loved modern literature and spoke several languages, remained socially active in the community and had "wide cultural and intellectual interests." After her father's business failed, Edith realized that she would need to provide a livelihood for herself and decided to become an educator.

Edith was the oldest of five siblings that included three sisters (Alice (1869–1970), Margaret (1871–1969), and Norah (1873–1945)) and a brother (Arthur "Quint" (1886–1967)), all of whom were accomplished in their respective fields. Edith became an educator and renowned author; Alice became a founder of industrial medicine; Margaret, like her older sister, Edith, became an educator and headmistress at Bryn Mawr School; and Norah was an artist. Hamilton's youngest sibling, Arthur, was nineteen years her junior. He became a writer, professor of Spanish, and assistant dean for foreign students at the University of Illinois at Urbana-Champaign. Arthur was the only sibling to marry; he and his wife, Mary Neal (d. 1965), had no children.

=== Education ===
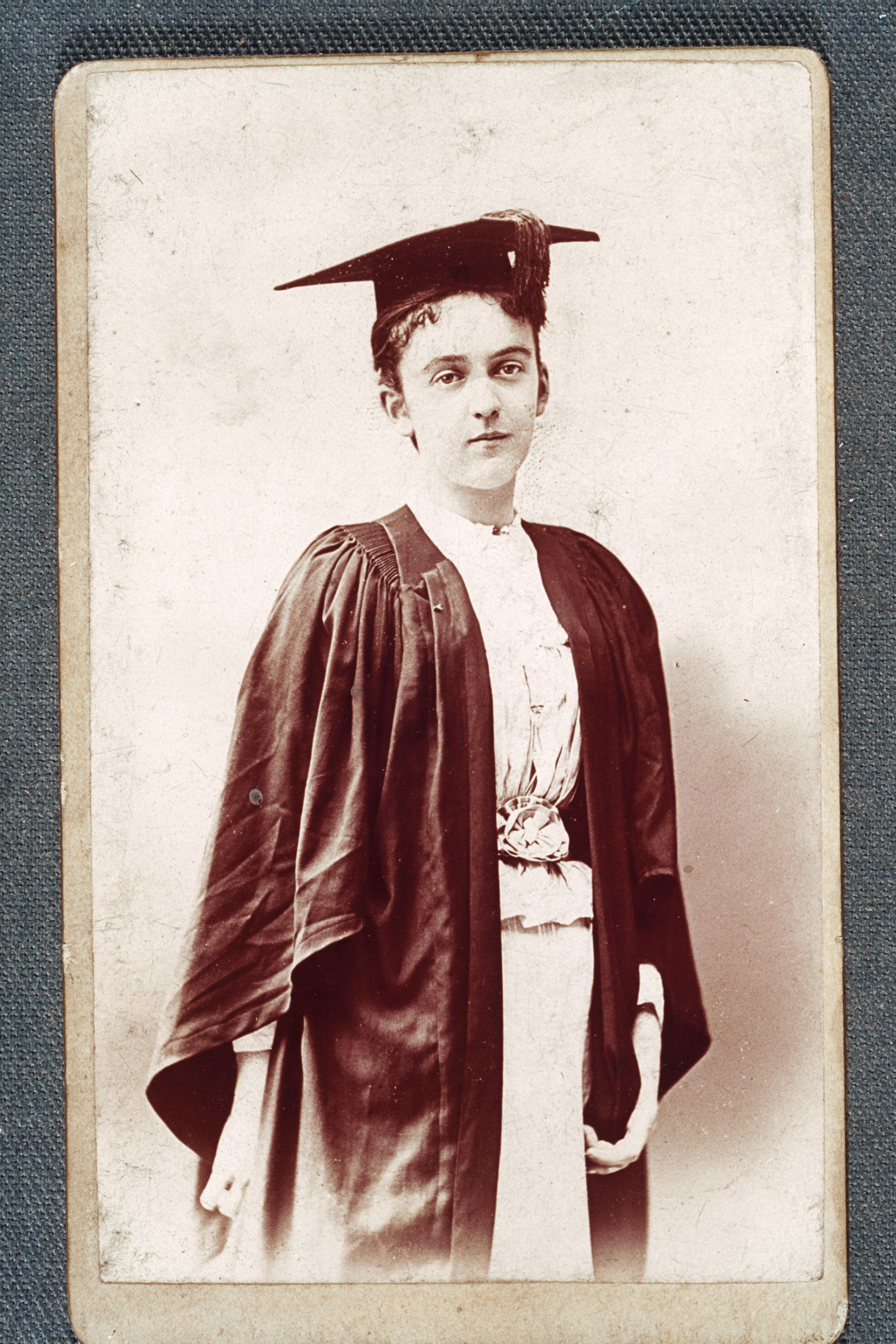
Edith Hamilton in graduation cap and gown

Because Edith's parents disliked the public school system's curriculum, they taught their children at home. As she once described him, "My father was well-to-do, but he wasn't interested in making money; he was interested in making people use their minds." Edith, who learned to read at an early age, became an excellent storyteller. Hamilton credited her father for guiding her towards studies of the classics; he began teaching her Latin when she was seven years old. Her father also introduced her to Greek language and literature, where her mother taught the Hamilton children French and had them tutored in German.

In 1884 Edith began two years of study at Miss Porter's Finishing School for Young Ladies (now known as Miss Porter's School) in Farmington, Connecticut, where attendance was a family tradition for the Hamilton women. Three of Hamilton's aunts, three cousins, and her three sisters attended the school.

Hamilton returned to Indiana in 1886 and began four years of preparation prior to her acceptance at Bryn Mawr College near Philadelphia, Pennsylvania, in 1891. She majored in Greek and Latin and was awarded a Bachelor of Arts and a Master of Arts degree in 1894. Hamilton spent the year after her graduation as a fellow in Latin at Bryn Mawr College and was awarded the Mary E. Garrett European Fellowship, the college's highest honor. The cash award from Bryn Mawr provided funds to enable Edith and Alice, who had completed her medical degree at the University of Michigan in 1893, to pursue further studies in Germany for an academic year. Hamilton became the first woman to enroll at the Ludwig-Maximilians-Universität München.

==== Studies in Germany ====
In the fall of 1895 the Hamilton sisters departed for Germany, where Alice intended to continue her studies in pathology at Leipzig University and Edith planned to study the classics and attend lectures. At that time, most North American women, including Edith and Alice, registered as auditors for their classes. When the sisters arrived at Leipzig University, they found a fair number of foreign women who studied there. They were informed that women could attend lectures, but they were expected to remain "invisible" and would not be allowed to participate in discussions.

According to Alice, "Edith was extremely disappointed with the lectures she attended." Although they were thorough, the lectures "lost sight of the beauty of literature by focusing on obscure grammatical points." As a result, they decided to enroll at the Ludwig-Maximilians-Universität München, but it was not much of an improvement. Initially, it was uncertain whether Edith would be allowed to audit lectures, but she was granted permission to do so, albeit under trying conditions. According to Alice, when Edith arrived at her first class, she was escorted to the lecture platform and seated in a chair beside the lecturer, facing the audience, "so that nobody would be contaminated by contact with her." Edith is quoted as saying, "the head of the University used to stare at me, then shake his head and say sadly to a colleague, 'There now, you see what's happened? We're right in the midst of the woman question.'"

== Career ==
=== Educator ===
Hamilton intended to remain at the Ludwig-Maximilians-Universität München in Germany, to earn a doctoral degree, but her plans changed after Martha Carey Thomas, president of Bryn Mawr College, persuaded Hamilton to return to the United States. In 1896 Hamilton became head administrator of Bryn Mawr School. Founded in 1885 as a college preparatory school for girls in Baltimore, Maryland, Bryn Mawr School was the country's only private high school for women that prepared all of its students for collegiate coursework. The school's students were required to pass Bryn Mawr College's entrance exam as a requirement for graduation.

Although Hamilton never completed her doctorate, she did become an "inspiring and respected head of the school" and was revered as an outstanding teacher of the classics, along with being an effective and successful administrator. She enhanced student life, maintained its high academic standards, and offered new ideas. Hamilton was unafraid to suggest new initiatives such as having her school's basketball team compete against another girls' team from a nearby boarding school. The proposed athletic competition was considered a scandalous suggestion for the time because news coverage would include the names of the participants. After Hamilton convinced the local press not to cover the event, the games proceeded and it became an annual tradition.

In 1906, Hamilton's accomplishments as an educator and administrator were recognized when she was named the first headmistress in the school's history. Hamilton, who believed in providing students with a "rigorous" curriculum, successfully transitioned the girls school from its "mediocre beginnings into one of the foremost preparatory institutions in the country." Her insistence on offering challenging standards to the students and different options on school policies led to confrontations with Dean Thomas. As Hamilton became increasingly frustrated with the situation at the school, her health also declined. She retired in 1922 at the age of fifty-four, after twenty-six years of service to the school.

=== Classicist and author ===
After retiring as an educator in 1922 and moving to New York City in 1924, Hamilton began a second career as an author of essays and best-selling books on ancient Greek and Roman civilizations. She had studied Greek and Latin from her youth and it remained her lifelong interest. "I came to the Greeks early," Hamilton told an interviewer when she was ninety-one, "and I found answers in them. Greece's great men let all their acts turn on the immortality of the soul. We don't really act as if we believed in the soul's immortality and that's why we are where we are today."

For more than fifty years her "love affair with Greece had smoldered without literary outlet". At the suggestion of Rosamund Gilder, editor of Theater Arts Monthly, Hamilton began by writing essays about Greek drama and comedies. Several of her early articles were published in Theater Arts Monthly before she began writing the series of books on ancient Greek and Roman life for which she is most noted. Hamilton went on to become America's most renowned classicist of her era.

According to her biographer, Barbara Sicherman, Hamilton's life was "ruled by a passionately nonconformist vision" that was also the source of her "strength and vitality" as well as her "appeal as public figure and author." However, Hamilton was not, and did not claim to be, a scholar. She did not attempt to present excessive detailed facts from the past. Instead, Hamilton focused on readability and uncovering "truths of the spirit," which she found from ancient writers. Drawing from Greek, Roman, Hebrew, and early Christian writings, Hamilton put into words what ancient people were like by concentrating on what they wrote about their own lives. Using the qualities and styles of the ancient writers, she emulated their directness, strived for perfection, and did not include footnotes.

The Greek Way

Hamilton was sixty-two when her first book, The Greek Way, was published in 1930 and is considered by some as her most honored work. The successful book, which Hamilton wrote at the urging of Elling Annestad, an editor at W. W. Norton Company, made her a well-known author in the United States. The bestseller drew comparisons between ancient Greece and modern-day life with essays about some of the great figures of Athenian history and literature. Critically praised for its "vivid and graceful prose," the book brought Hamilton immediate acclaim and established her reputation as a scholar. Biographer Robert Kanigel states that "The Greek Way renders the ancient Greek mind accessible to the modern reader. It serves up a delectable appetizer of Greek civilization that leaves you begging for the rest of the meal. It is a work of popularization of the highest order."

In Hamilton's view, Greek civilization at its peak represented a "flowering of the mind" that has yet to be equaled in the history of the world. The Greek Way showed that the Greeks recognized and appreciated such things as love, athletic games, love of knowledge, fine arts, and intelligent conversation. In "East and West," the first of the book's twelve chapters, Hamilton described the differences between the West and the Eastern nations which preceded it. One book reviewer noted that the Greeks, which Hamilton considered the first Westerners, challenged Eastern ways that "remained the same throughout the ages, forever remote from all that is modern." Hamilton further suggested that the modern spirit of the West was "a Greek discovery, and the place of the Greeks is in the modern world."

More recent writers have used Hamilton's observations in contrasting the civilizations and cultures of the East with that of the West. In comparing ancient Egypt with Greece, for instance, Hamilton's writing describes the unique geography, climate, agriculture, and government. Historian James Golden cites from The Greek Way that "Egyptian society was preoccupied with death." Its pharaohs erected giant monuments to themselves to impress future generations and its priests advised the slaves to "look forward to an afterlife." Golden used Hamilton's research to contrast these differences with the Greeks, especially the Athenians. Hamilton argued that individual "perfection of mind and body" dominated Greek thought and as a result, the Greeks "excelled at philosophy and sports" and that life "in all its exuberant potential" was the hallmark of Greek civilization.

The Roman Way

The Roman Way (1932), her second book, provided similar contrasts between ancient Rome and present-day life. It was also a Book-of-the-Month Club selection in 1957. Hamilton described life as it existed according to ancient Roman poets such as Plautus, Virgil and Juvenal, interpreted Roman thought and manners, and compared them to people's lives in the twentieth century. She also suggested how Roman ideas applied to the modern world.

Although her books were successful and popular among readers, she conceded "that it was hopeless to persuade Americans to be Greeks" and that "life had become far too complex since the age of Pericles to recapture the simple directness of Greek life ... the calm lucidity of the Greek mind, which convinced the great thinkers of Athens of their mastery of truth and enlightenment."

The Prophets of Israel

Her books later covered other areas of interest, especially from the Bible. In 1936, Hamilton wrote The Prophets of Israel (Norton, 1936), which interpreted the beliefs of the "spokesmen for God" in the Old Testament. With no knowledge of the Hebrew language, she relied on English language versions of the Bible to similarly compare the achievements and personal lives of the prophets with those of twentieth-century readers. She concludes that the prophets were practical and their political views reflected their time, but their ideals were modern.

Hamilton also summarized the importance of that connection to people in modern times: "Love and grief and joy remain the same forever beautiful" and "poetic truth is always true" as are truths of the spirit. "The prophets understand them as no men have more, and in their pages we can find ourselves. Our aspirations are there, our desires for humanity." American historian Bruce Catton noted the prophets, whose "religion was an affair of the workaday world," and their messages that Hamilton described in her "excellent book" are still as relevant today. A subsequent edition of the book, Spokesmen for God: The Great Teachers of the Old Testament (Norton, 1949), supplied additional commentary on the first five books of the Old Testament. Christian Science historian Robert Peel described it as "a work of sheer delight."

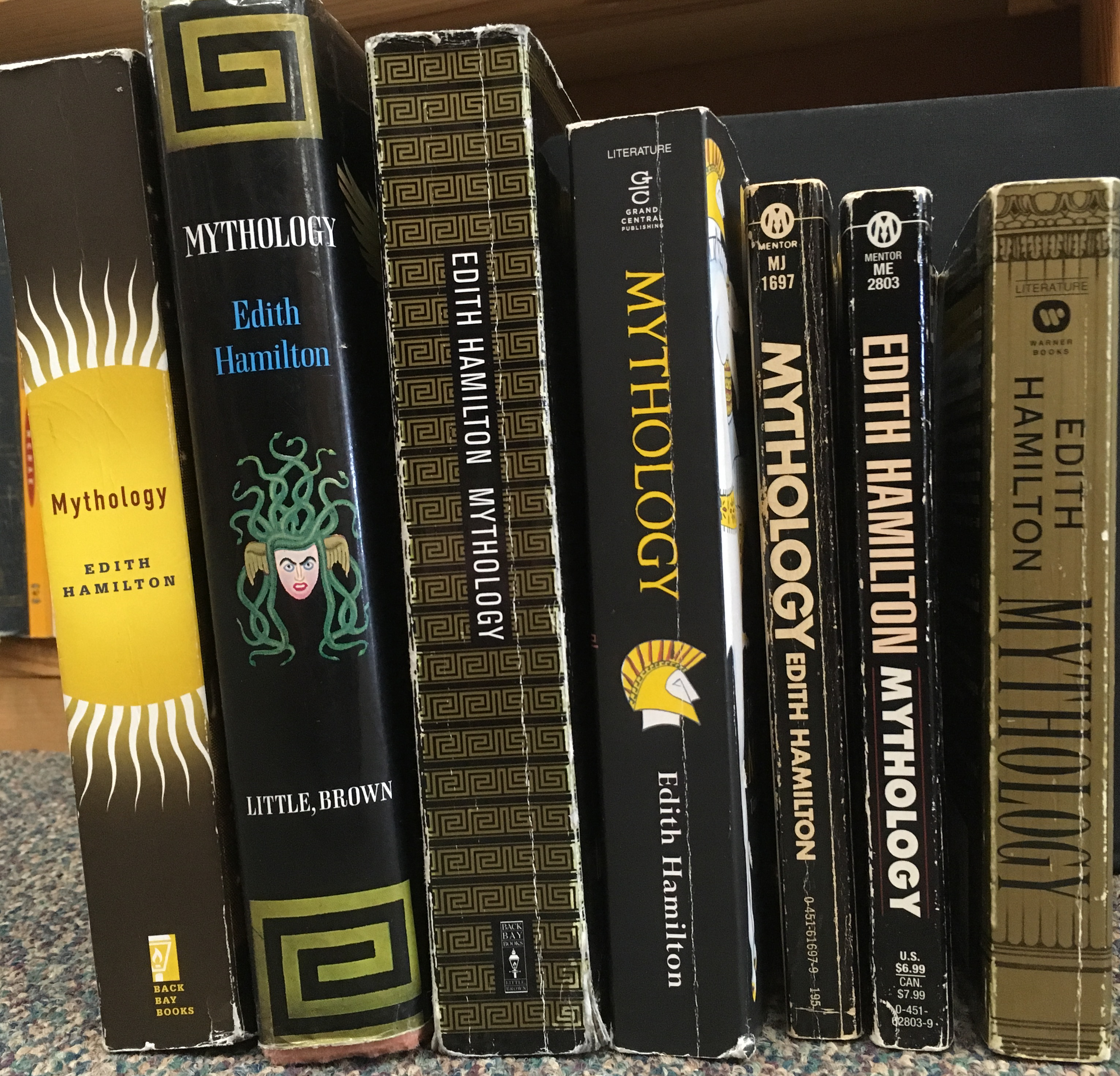
Many editions of Hamilton's magnum opus

Mythology

John Mason Brown, American drama critic, praised Hamilton's The Greek Way, placing it at the top among modern-day written about ancient Greece," and Mythology as "incomparably superior to Thomas Bulfinch's work on the subject. Hamilton's Mythology (1942), recounts the stories of classical mythology and ancient fables. She used an approach to mythology that was entirely through the literature of the classics. (She had not traveled to Greece until 1929 and was not an archaeologist.) The book received favorable reviews, was another Book-of-the-Month Club selection, and had sold more than four and a half million copies by 1957.

Later works

In 1942, after moving to Washington, D.C., Hamilton continued to write. At the age of eighty-two she offered new perspectives on the New Testament in Witness to the Truth: Christ and His Interpreters (1948) and produced a sequel to The Greek Way, titled The Echo of Greece (1957). The sequel to her first book discusses the political ideas of such teachers and leaders as Socrates, Plato, Aristotle, Demosthenes, and Alexander the Great.

Hamilton continued traveling and lecturing in her eighties, and wrote articles, reviews, and translations of Greek plays, including The Trojan Women, Prometheus Bound, and Agamemnon. She also edited, with Huntington Cairns, The Collected Dialogues of Plato (1961).

== Companion Doris Reid ==
Doris Fielding Reid (1895–1973) was an American stockbroker. She was the daughter of Harry Fielding Reid, an American geophysicist, and Edith Gittings Reid, biographer of Doctor William Osler and President Woodrow Wilson. She was a student of Edith Hamilton. Reid was employed by Loomis, Sayles and Company beginning in 1929. Reid and Hamilton became lifelong companions. They lived together in Gramercy Park, Manhattan and Seawall, Maine, during which time they raised and home-schooled Reid's nephew, Francis Dorian Fielding Reid (1917–2008). After Hamilton's death, Reid published the book Edith Hamilton: An Intimate Portrait (1967). Reid died on January 15, 1973, in Manhattan. Both women are buried at Cove Cemetery in Hadlyme, Connecticut.

== Later years ==
Hamilton and Doris Reid remained in New York City until 1943, then moved to Washington, D.C., and spent their summers in Maine. In Washington, Reid was in charge of the local offices of Loomis, Sayles and Company, an investment firm that had been her employer since 1929; Hamilton continued to write and frequently entertained friends, fellow writers, government representatives, and other dignitaries at her home. Among the eminent and famous were Isak Dinesen, Robert Frost, Harvard classicist Werner Jaeger and labor leader John L. Lewis.

After her move to Washington, Hamilton became a commentator on education projects and began to receive honors for her work. Hamilton also recorded programs for television programs and Voice of America, traveled to Europe, and continued to write books, articles, essays, and book reviews.

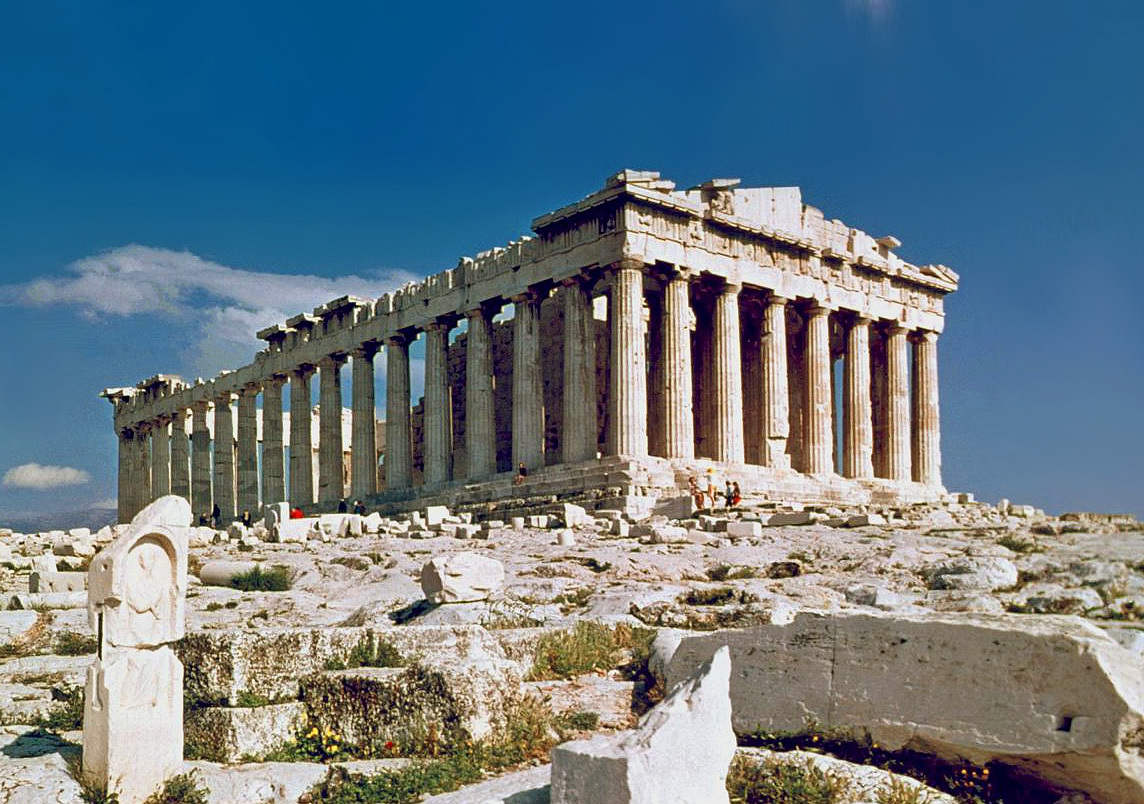
The Parthenon

Hamilton considered the high point of her life to be a trip to Greece at age 90 in 1957, where, in Athens, she saw her translation of Aeschylus's Prometheus Bound performed at the ancient Odeon theater of Herodes Atticus. As part of the evening's ceremonies, King Paul of Greece awarded the Golden Cross of the Order of Benefaction—one of Greece's highest honors—to her. The mayor of Athens made her an honorary citizen of the city. The US news media, including Time magazine, covered the event. An article in Publishers Weekly described the event in Hamilton's honor: floodlights illuminated the Parthenon, the Temple of Zeus and, for the first time in history, the Stoa. Hamilton called the ceremony "the proudest moment of my life."

== Modern influences ==
Many of the facts in The Greek Way (1930) have surprised modern readers. One reviewer in Australia explained Hamilton's view "that the spirit of our age is a Greek discovery, and that the Greeks were really the first Westerners, and the first intellectualists." The same reviewer also credited the book with noting that modern concepts of play and sport were actually common activities to the Greeks, who engaged in exercise and athletic events, including games, races, and music, dancing, and wrestling competitions, among others.

Among those whose lives were influenced by Hamilton's writings was U.S. Senator Robert F. Kennedy. In the months after his brother, President John F. Kennedy, was assassinated, Robert was consumed with grief. Former First Lady Jacqueline Kennedy gave him a copy of The Greek Way, which she felt was certain to help him. Political commentator David Brooks reported that Hamilton's essays helped him better understand and then recover from his brother's tragic death. Hamilton's writings remained important to him over time, as Brooks explains, and changed Kennedy's life. "He carried his beaten, underlined and annotated copy around with him for years, reading sections aloud to audiences in a flat, unrhythmic voice with a mournful edge" and could recite from memory various passages of Aeschylus that Hamilton had translated.

According to reviewers, Hamilton's The Prophets of Israel (1936) had similarities to her earlier books about Greeks and Romans by making the prophets' messages relevant to contemporary readers. She accomplishes this, according to one writer, by showing that "behind all great thought stands an individual mind, fired by passion and possessed of an eye that sees deeply into humanity." The views of the prophets, it adds, are very similar to those in modern times: "The prophets were forerunners of three genuinely American movements—humanism, pragmatism and the philosophy of common sense."

== Death ==
Hamilton died in Washington, D.C. on May 31, 1963, at the age of 95. Four years after her death, Doris Fielding Reid published Edith Hamilton: An Intimate Portrait.

Reid died on January 15, 1973. Both women are buried at Cove Cemetery in Hadlyme, Connecticut, where Hamilton's sisters had retired, in the same cemetery as Hamilton's mother (Gertrude), sisters (Alice, Norah, and Margaret), and Margaret's life partner, Clara Landsberg. Hamilton's adopted son, Dorian, who had earned a degree in chemistry at Amherst College, died at West Lafayette, Indiana, in January 2008, aged 90.

== Legacy ==
Hamilton was long recognized as a great classicist of her era. Her best-selling books were especially noteworthy for their accessibility to a wide readership and for "representing the Greeks in particular as a prestigious source of cultural inspiration for American society during the decade before and the two decades after World War II."

Although Hamilton's reputation as an author is closely tied to her writings about Greece, much of her professional life focused on Latin. Hamilton "claimed special expertise in Greek," but after her graduation from Bryn Mawr College, where she majored in Greek and Latin, she spent another year at the college as a fellow in Latin and another year studying Latin in Germany. Hamilton also taught Latin to girls in the senior class during her 26-year career at Bryn Mawr School in Baltimore. However, with the exception of The Roman Way, Hamilton's written works primarily focused on fourth and fifth century BC Athens. Hamilton's correspondence and papers are held at the Schlesinger Library at Radcliffe College.

== Honors and recognition ==
In 1906 Hamilton became the first headmistress of the Bryn Mawr School in Baltimore, Maryland.

In 1950 Hamilton received the honorary degree of Doctor of Letters from the University of Rochester and the University of Pennsylvania. She was also the recipient of an honorary degree from Yale University in 1960. In addition, Hamilton was elected to the American Institute of Arts and Letters in 1955 and the American Academy of Arts and Letters in 1957.

Hamilton received the National Achievement Award in 1951 as a distinguished classical scholar and author. She received the award along with Anna M. Rosenberg, Assistant Secretary of Defense. The award was created in 1930 to honor women of accomplishment and inspire others.

Hamilton was awarded the Golden Cross of the Order of Benefaction, Greece's highest honor, and became an honorary citizen of the city in 1957.

In 1957 and 1958 she was interviewed by NBC television, and in 1957 The Greek Way and The Roman Way were selected by the Book of the Month Club as summer readings. John F. Kennedy invited her to his inauguration, which she declined. He also sent an emissary to her home asking for advice about a new cultural center.

In 1958 the Women's National Book Association awarded her for her contribution to American culture through books. George V. Allen, director of the United States Information Agency (USIA) and one of the speakers at the award ceremony, remarked that her interpretation of the democratic spirit of ancient Greece, defined "the fundamental of the democratic ideal itself." He also noted that USIA included seven of her books in its overseas libraries in order to help people of other countries interpret American ideals.

She is the subject of a biography by Doris Fielding Reid, Edith Hamilton: An Intimate Portrait.

Robert F. Kennedy quoted from Hamilton's translated works, "in what is perhaps his most memorable speech", during a campaign rally on April 4, 1968, in Indianapolis, Indiana, as the news of the assassination of Martin Luther King Jr. spread. Kennedy quoted from memory several lines from Hamilton's translation of Aeschylus's tragedy, Agamemnon, telling the grief-stricken crowd: "In our sleep, pain which cannot forget falls drop by drop upon the heart until, in our own despair, against our will, comes wisdom through the awful grace of God." Kennedy also incorporated another line from Hamilton's writing, "her representation of an ancient Greek inscription" in his closing remarks to the crowd: "Let us dedicate ourselves to what the Greeks wrote so many years ago––to tame the savageness of man and make gentle the life of this world." According to classicist Joseph Casazza, that line about "taming the savageness of man" was created by Hamilton herself and has no direct relation to a single ancient text. Based on his research, Casazza believes that the phrase is a combination of a line from a 125 B.C. decree about Athens by Delphi and another line from On the Character of Thucydides by Dionysius of Halicarnassus.

In 2000 the city of Fort Wayne, Indiana, erected statues of two Hamilton sisters, Edith and Alice, along with their cousin, Agnes, in the city's Headwaters Park.

== Selected published works ==
- The Greek Way (1930)
- The Roman Way (1932)
- The Prophets of Israel (1936)
- Three Greek Plays (1937)
- Mythology: Timeless Tales of Gods and Heroes (1942)
- The Great Age of Greek Literature (1942)
- Witness to the Truth: Christ and His Interpreters (1948)
- Spokesmen for God (1949)
- The Echo of Greece (1957)
- The Collected Dialogues of Plato, Including the Letters (1961), edited by Edith Hamilton and Huntington Cairns
- The Ever Present Past (1964), collected essays and reviews

== Bibliography ==
- "Edith Hamilton". The New York Times: 22. June 1, 1963.
- Hallett, Judith P. (2015). "Edith Hamilton". In Gugin, Linda C.; St. Clair, James E. (eds.). Indiana's 200: The People Who Shaped the Hoosier State. Indianapolis: Indiana Historical Society Press. pp. 150–51. ISBN 978-0-87195-387-2.
- Hamilton, Alice (1985). Exploring the Dangerous Trades: the Autobiography of Alice Hamilton, M.D. Boston: Northeastern University Press. pp. 44–51. ISBN 0-930350-81-2.
- Houseman, Victoria (2023). American classicist: the life and loves of Edith Hamilton. Princeton: Princeton University Press. ISBN 9780691236186.
- Jayes, Janice Lee (2002). "Hamilton, Edith (1867–1963)". In Commire, Anne (ed.). Gale - Institution Finder. Women in World History: A Biographical Encyclopedia. Gale Virtual Reference Library. Vol. 6. Detroit: Yorkin Publications. pp. 728–32.
- Sicherman, Barbara (1984). Alice Hamilton, A Life in Letters. Cambridge, Massachusetts: Harvard University Press. ISBN 0-674-01553-3.
- Sicherman, Barbara; Green, Carol Hurd (1980). Notable American Women: The Modern Period, A Biographical Dictionary. Cambridge, Massachusetts: Belknap Press of Harvard University. pp. 306–08. ISBN 978-0-674-62732-1.
- Singer, Sandra L. (2003). Adventures Abroad: North American Women at German-Speaking Universities, 1868–1915. Westport, Connecticut: Greenwood Publishing Group. ISBN 978-0-313-09686-0.
- Weber, Catherine E. Forrest (Winter 2002). "A Citizen of Athens: Fort Wayne's Edith Hamilton". Traces of Indiana and Midwestern History. 14 (1). Indianapolis: Indiana Historical Society: 38–47.
