= Josephine Stewart =

British schoolmistress, tennis and hockey player and golfer

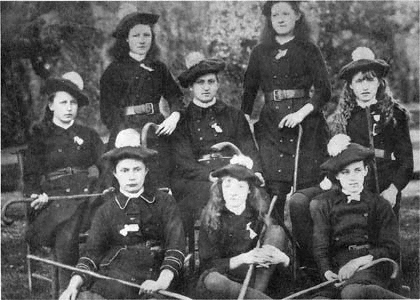
- Born: 8 August 1870; Edinburgh, Scotland
- Died: 26 May 1934 (aged 63); St Andrews, Scotland

Josephine "Phiny" Katherine Stewart (8 August 1870 – 26 May 1934) was a British schoolmistress, tennis and hockey player, golfer and President of the Scottish Women's Lacrosse Association. She was devoted to sport and St Leonards School in St Andrews in Scotland.

== Life ==
Stewart was born in 1870 in Edinburgh. Her parents were Anna Dowson Earle and Daniel Shaw Stewart who was a Captain in the 11th Hussars cavalry. When she was seven, St Andrews School for Girls was started in Fife by the women's rights campaigner Madeline Daniell and Stewart was one of her first pupils. That school was later renamed as the St Leonards School. The year before she left in 1888 she was the day girls games captain.

Stewart started five years away from the school where she passed exams organised by the Royal Academy of Music in singing in 1891. She won prizes at golf and tennis and she returned to St Leonards School in 1893 when the job of 'playground mistress' was created for her. The students at the school now had a member of staff to improve their exercise and their skills. She would practice girls at the nets and teach them how to fence. Fencing had been one of her favourite sports. She was known to have been a successful athlete and this meant that her guidance was valued.

This was three years after the game of Lacrosse had been launched for women at the school by Louisa Lumsden and Stewart coached some of the early players at the school. In 1895 she was elected vice-President of the Scottish Women's Hockey Association and the following year she won the St Andrews ladies' golf club's spring medal.

Stewart was a member when the first Ladies Lacrosse Council was formed in 1912 and in 1920 Stewart's role in the early history of the game of Lacrosse was acknowledged when she became the President of the Scottish Women's Lacrosse Association. A role she held until she died in St Andrews in 1934. She died a few weeks before she was, fearfully, going to retire. Her gravestone ignores the five years she was not actually at the school and says "at St Leonards School 1877–1934".
