= Glasgow Women's Library =

Public library in Glasgow, Scotland

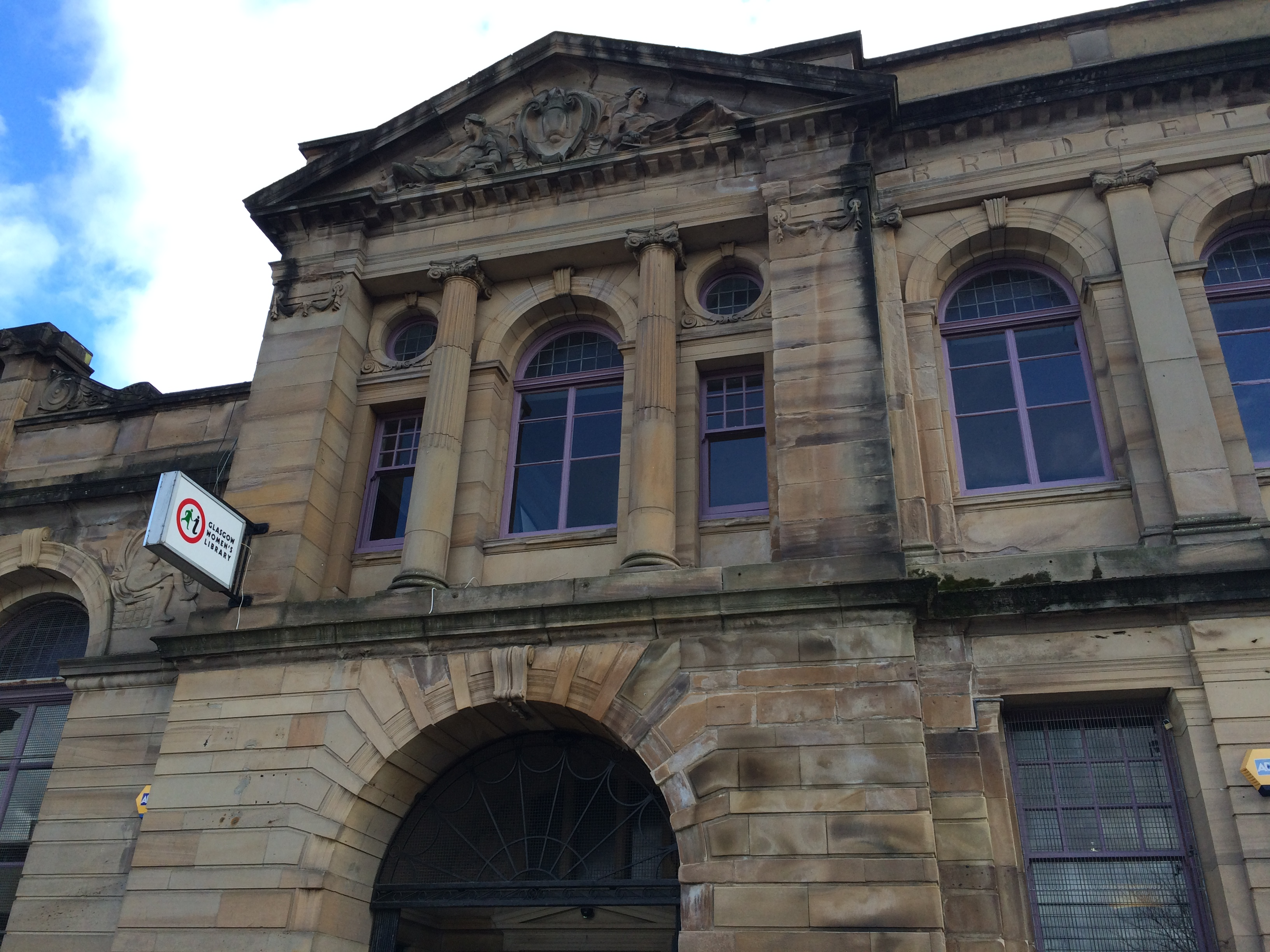
- 55.849°N 4.228°W
- Location: Glasgow, Scotland, UK
- Type: Public library, Museum
- Established: 1991

Other information
- Website: womenslibrary.org.uk

Glasgow Women's Library is a public library, registered company and charity based in the Bridgeton area of Glasgow, Scotland. It is the only accredited museum dedicated to women's history and provides information relevant to women's culture and achievements. It tries to operate on feminist principles. The library was awarded Recognised Collection of National Significance to Scotland status in 2015, as the collection contains valuable resources pertaining to women and their lives. In 2018, it was shortlisted for Museum of the Year. The museum supplies and encourages training and education, as well as skill-sharing via volunteers and/or staff.

== History ==
The Women's Library was established in 1991. The original library was housed in a shop front in Garnethill on the corner of Hill and Dalhousie Street. It evolved from the 'Women in Profile' project, whose aim was to ensure the visibility of women in the programming of Glasgow, European City of Culture year. By 2016 the number of paid staff had reached 22, along with 100 volunteers.

In 2010 the library moved to the Mitchell Library in the Charing Cross area of the city, occupying the space formally used by the Anderston Library. Following a decision taken in 2012, it moved to more suitable premises in Landressy Street in Bridgeton, the former site of Bridgeton Library, which was a B listed Carnegie Library built in 1903. The move was completed in November 2015, after two years of renovation work. Collective Architecture were responsible for the refurbishment which included an innovative external lift shaft incorporating book titles. The new library was officially opened on 7 November 2015 by Nicola Sturgeon.

Co-founder Dr. Adele Patrick won the Scottish Woman of the Year award in 2015, and a Woman of the Year in 2016.

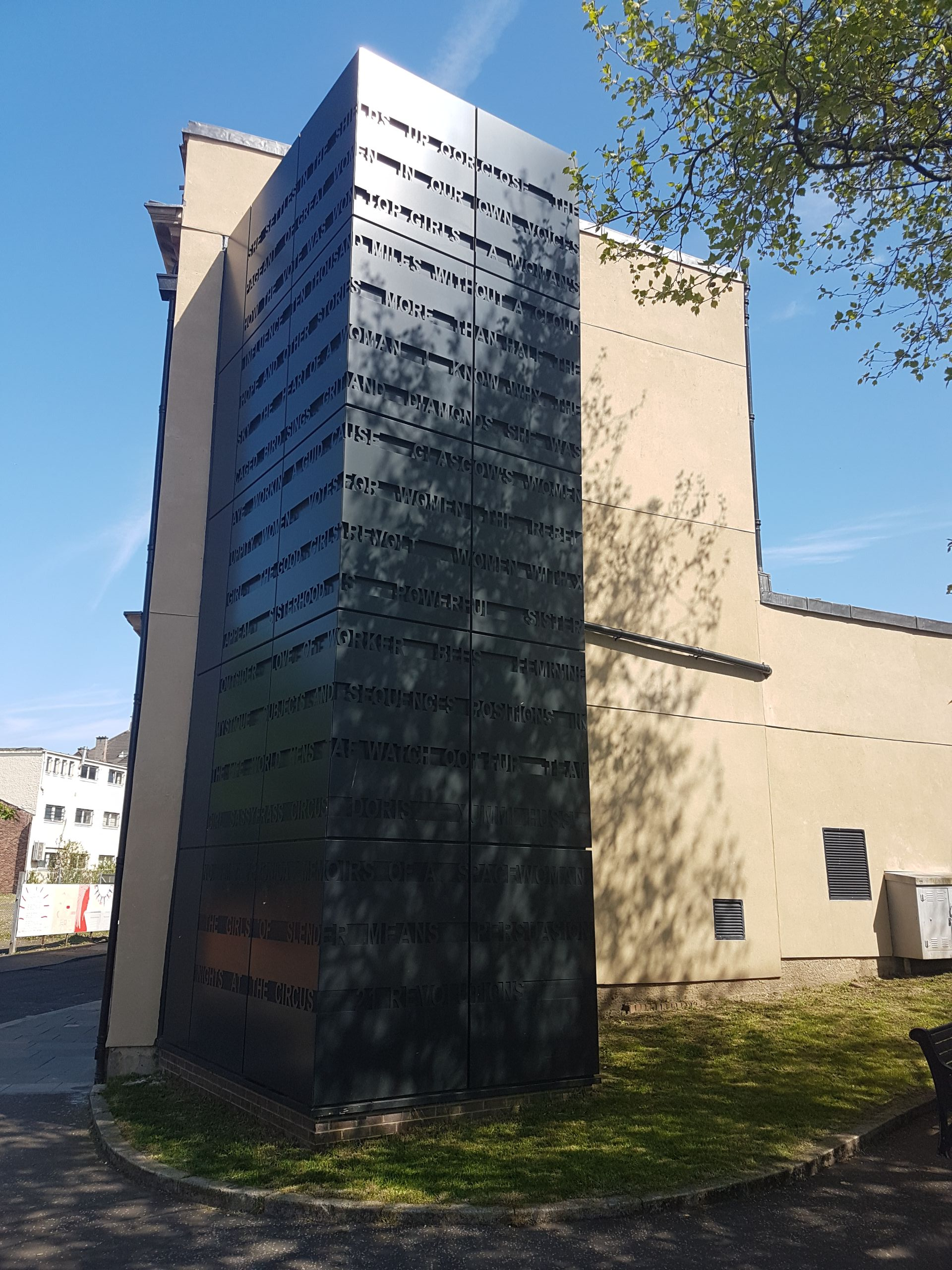
External lift shaft incorporating book titles

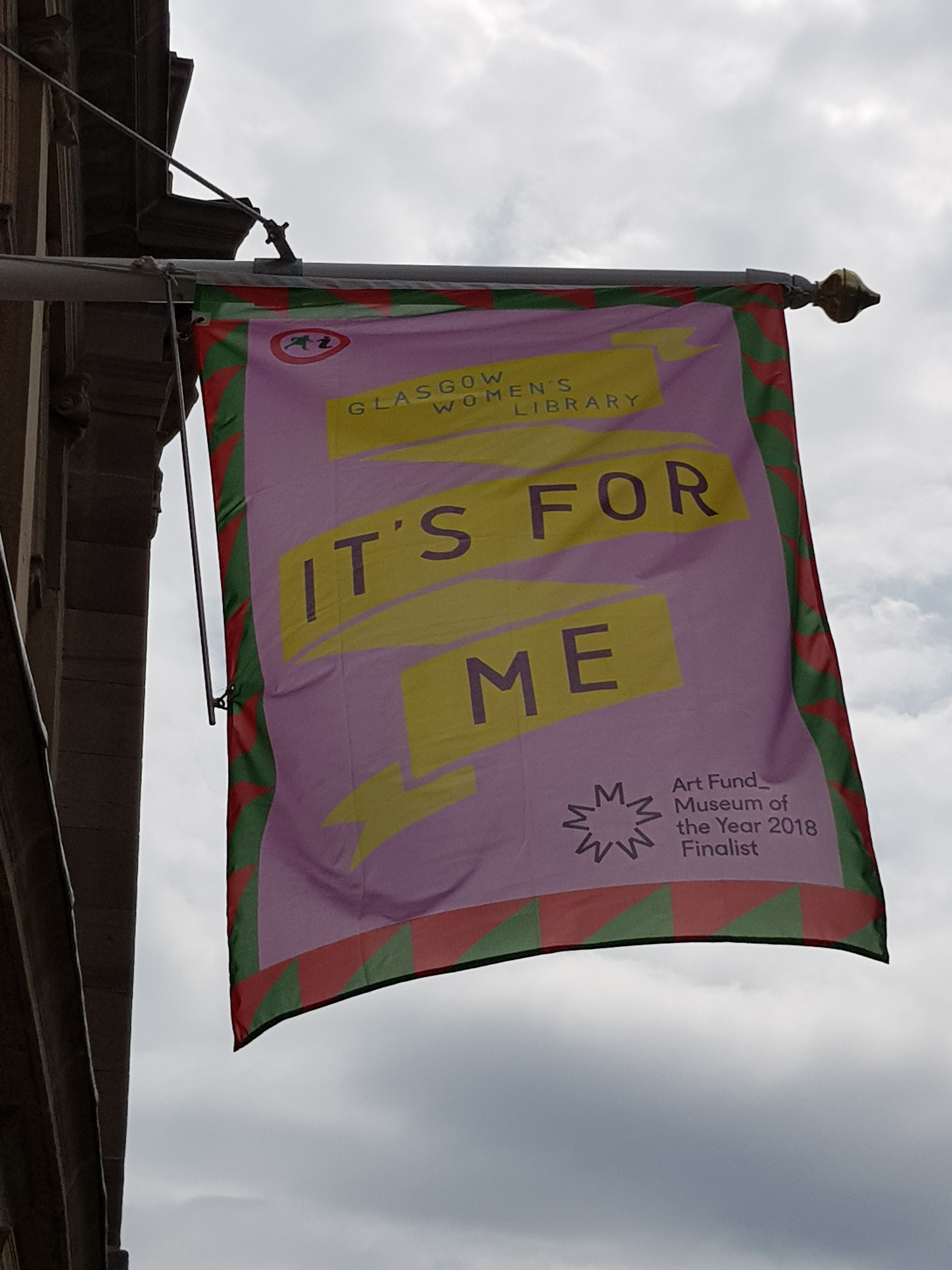
Flag outside the Glasgow Women's Library

== Collections and projects ==
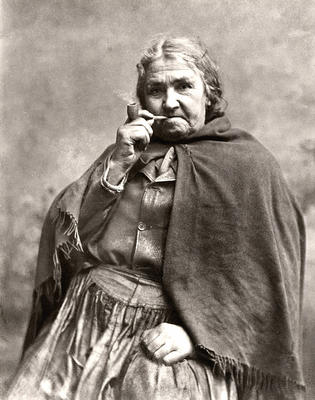
"Big Rachel" was a special constable in 1875

The library is the UK's only accredited museum concerned with women's history, and was awarded Recognised Collection of National Significance to Scotland status in 2015. The collection includes Suffragette memorabilia, knitting and dress making patterns from the 1930s, Girls' annuals c.1950s to 1980s and Scottish Women's Liberation newsletters from the 1970s. Amongst its archival collections is the Lesbian Archive which is one of the most important LGBT collections in the UK.

The library houses the National Museum of Roller Derby; a sport which was pioneered by women. It includes sports equipment, programmes and publications including the magazine Inline.

In 2011, and in celebration of their 21st birthday in 2012, the library launched the 21 Revolutions project, commissioning a group of 21 artists and 21 writers, including Janice Galloway and Denise Mina, to make work inspired by their collection. The work was published in a book of the same name.

In 2015 the library nominated The Suffragette Oak, a tree in Kelvingrove Park, for the Woodland Trust Scottish Tree of the Year award. The oak tree went on to win the award and was then a nominee in the 2016 European Tree of the Year awards. When the tree was damaged by Storm Ophelia, it had to be reduced in size in order to save it. The offcuts were donated to the Library and became earrings, chopping boards, coasters, magnets and trinket boxes by local artist Annie Graham.

In 2017 the library, working with YouthLink Scotland, displayed research on inspirational women from five communities. The project was supported by the Heritage Lottery Fund.

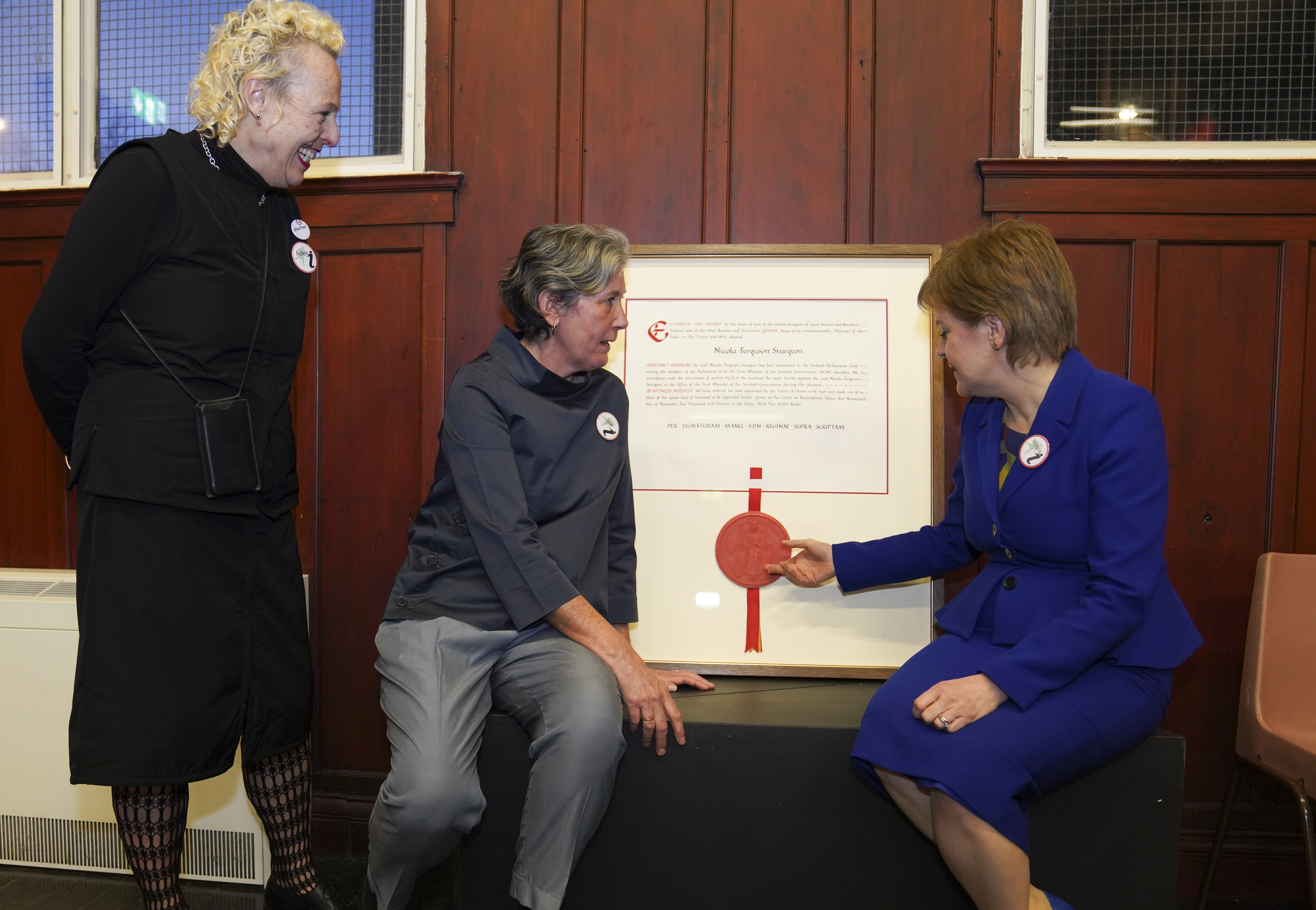
Nicola Sturgeon handing her Great Seal to Women's Library co-directors Adele Patrick and Sue John.

The library is home to an expanding zine collection, which helps document the lives and experiences of women. The collection includes comics and political publications as well as personal and music zines. The library runs regular workshops to raise awareness of zines and encourage women to make their own.

To mark her retirement from the role and her place as the first female First Minister of Scotland, Nicola Sturgeon donated her Great Seal of Scotland to the Library's museum collection in March 2023.

== Services ==
Glasgow Women's Library is free to join and provides clubs, events, courses and workshops. This includes an adult literacy and numeracy project, a Black and Minority Ethnic Women's Project and a lending library. The archives include historical and contemporary artefacts relating to women's lives and achievements. The group provide guided walks around Glasgow through the "Women Make History" project highlighting local women like Big Rachel.

Scotland's virtual reference scheme, Ask Scotland, has allowed questions to be posed online and referred to the Glasgow Women's Library since 2011.

The library regularly hosts exhibitions ranging from work by outsider artists or students at GSA, to established artists and items from the library's collections. Recently due to the COVID-19 pandemic the exhibitions and other regular events have been held online.

== See also ==
- Fawcett Society, a UK-wide charity and pressure group
- Feminist Library, in London
- Women's Library, London (now held at the LSE)
- Women's suffrage in the United Kingdom
- Women's writing (literary category)
