= St Leonards School =

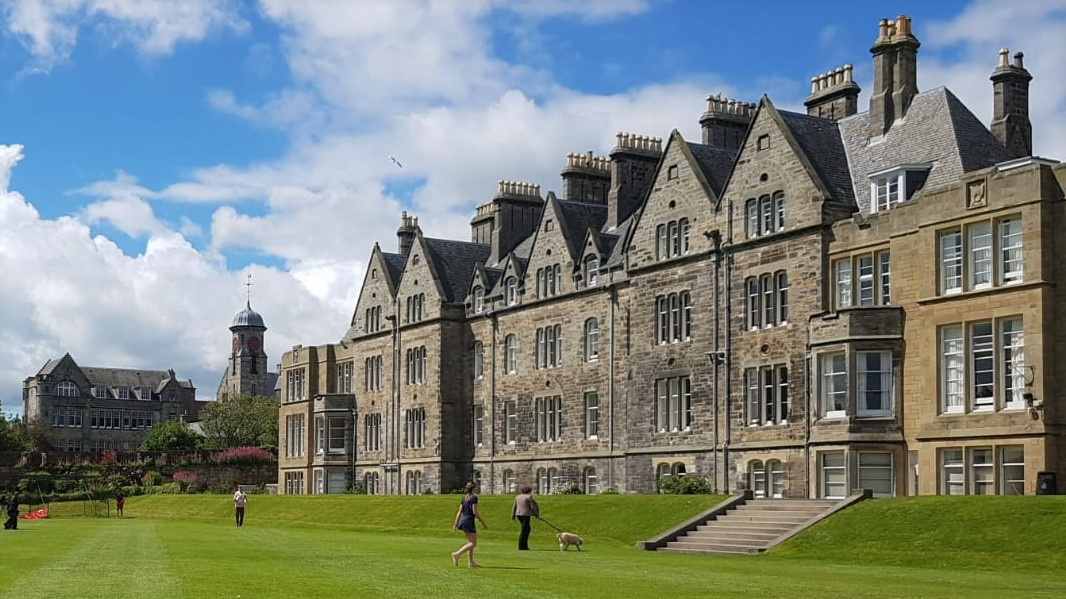

Location
- St Andrews, Fife, KY16 9QJ; Scotland; 56.3390°N 2.7904°W

Information
- Former names: St Andrews School for Girls, St Leonards and St Katharines School
- Type: Private school (UK); Boarding school
- Motto: Latin: Ad Vitam (For Life)
- Established: 1877; 149 years ago
- Founders: Professors from the University of St Andrews, including Lewis Campbell
- Chair: Colonel Martin Passmore
- Head: Simon Brian
- Gender: Co-educational
- Age range: 4–19
- Enrolment: 565
- Houses: Bishopshall, Ollerenshaw, St Rule
- Colours: Red and navy
- Publication: The Gazette
- School fees: £9,552–£15,474 (day) (pa); £24,651–£37,452 (boarding) (pa)
- Alumni: St Leonards Seniors
- Website: www.stleonards-fife.org

St Leonards School is a co-educational private boarding and day school for pupils aged 4–19 in St Andrews, Fife, Scotland. Founded in 1877 as St Andrews School for Girls Company, it adopted the St Leonards name upon moving to its current premises, the site formerly occupied by St Leonard's College, University of St Andrews’ in 1883.

The school emerged from the St Andrews Ladies' Educational Association which was established in 1868. One of the school's founders was Lewis Campbell, chairman of the college council for many years and a Classics professor at St Andrews University who advocated for higher education for women. Consequently, from its earliest days, the college's senior students were encouraged to prepare to matriculate and enjoyed close links with various courses offered at the University of St Andrews; in 1892, the Fifeshire Journal asked its readers: "Who is to enjoy the proud distinction of being the first matriculated girl-student of St Andrews?" St Leonards remained an all-girls school until 1999, upon which it became fully co-educational. As an IB World School, St Leonards offers the International Baccalaureate's Primary Years, Middle Years, Career-related and Diploma programmes alongside the English-system GCSE/IGCSE. It is one of only two schools in Scotland to teach an IB curriculum throughout.

== History ==
The school was established in 1877 by the St Andrews School for Girls Company whose Articles of Association were drawn up on the lines of Bristol's Clifton College, the public school for boys. The school's administrative and commercial ventures utilised the company's name until at least 1894. Madeline Daniell, the educationalist and campaigner for women's right to higher education, was one of two founding secretaries of the company.

Dame Louisa Lumsden was appointed the School's first Headmistress in 1877. The belief of the school was that "a girl should receive an education that is as good as her brother's, if not better" and Lumsden was "determined to establish a veritable Eton for girls". Although her role as principal ended in 1882, her connection to the school remained strong for "forty-five years": During her time as a member of staff of the University of St Andrews' University Hall and in the years after, "Miss Lumsden returned many times to St Leonards to give lectures".

The school was, until 1894, operating primarily as a senior school, the junior school remaining informally structured until after that date.

In 1884, ground was feued [granted] from the University of St Andrews to the school which had also commenced the lease of a field from the university for recreational use. In 1894, Old Tom Morris laid out a 9-hole golf course for the girls at St Leonards.

To ensure that the teaching of Chemistry to the girls at the school was rigorous, in 1885, Dame Frances Dove, the principal, employed Thomas Purdie, Professor of Chemistry at St Andrews University as an external examiner for the school's senior students. From its earliest decades, the school's sixth formers "had the pleasure of attending lectures" in various subjects including Political Economy and Music at the University of St Andrews whilst others attended the university's Gifford Lectures.

In 1999, St Leonards Sixth Form and St Katharines Prep School opened their doors to boys for the first time; the school soon became completely co-educational.

=== St Katharines and St Leonards-New Park ===
St Katharines School was the original prep school of St Leonards. It was established in 1894 "in connection with and under the same council as St Leonards School". It made full use of St Leonard's campus and facilities while retaining a degree of autonomy. In March 2002 it was announced that the prep school would be relocated to the main building and renamed St Leonards Junior and Middle Schools. Following a further announcement in March 2005, St Leonards Junior and Middle schools merged with New Park School, also located in St Andrews, operating as one unit under the name St Leonards-New Park. In June 2011 it was announced that the Junior School would be known in future as St Leonards Junior School. At the same time, work commenced on a £2.5m redevelopment of the junior school. Today, St Leonards is an all-through, coeducational school, from Year 1 through to Year 13.

=== Lacrosse ===
The school is believed to be the first place in the world to have played women's lacrosse after it was introduced by Louisa Lumsden in 1890.

=== St Leonard's Chapel ===
Situated in the grounds of the school is St Leonard's Chapel, owned by the University of St Andrews. Regulations outlined by the University of St Andrews stipulate that "funerals for both alumni of the university and members or former members of St Leonards School may take place in the university's St Leonard's Chapel". Weekly Compline takes place in the chapel at 10pm on Thursday nights during the university term.

== Academics ==
At St Leonards, year groups are named following the system used in England and Wales (Year 1 to Year 13). Years 1–7 form the Junior School, Years 8–11 the Senior School and Years 12–13 the Sixth Form.

The IB's Primary Years Programme (PYP) is taught from Years 1–6, while the IB's Middle Years Programme (MYP) is introduced in Year 7 and continues through Year 9. Therefore, the MYP overlaps across the Junior and Senior years.

In Year 10, pupils begin a two-year course in preparation for their GCSE/IGCSE exams at the end of Year 11. Students are given a degree of choice as to which subjects they take, however a number remain compulsory: English, Maths, Science and a foreign language.

As an alternative to the above for pupils who join the school in Year 11, St Leonards offers a one-year Pre-IB course. These students sit IGCSE exams only.

In Years 12–13, St Leonards pupils may undertake one of two programmes: the IB Diploma Programme (DP) or the IB Career-related Programme (CP). A large majority choose the DP, with the latter being available for those who would prefer a more vocational qualification. Academic study is still very present for CP students alongside the practical aspect, as this programme incorporates at least two DP courses.

The average IB Diploma points score for St Leonards pupils from 2015 to 2019 is 33/45, compared to a global average of 29/45 points for the same period. St Leonards has been recognised as the "Top Independent Secondary School Sixth Form in Scotland for IB/A Level Results" in 2016, 2017 and 2018. In 2019, St Leonards was named "Top Independent Secondary School in Scotland" by The Sunday Times Parent Power guide.

Almost all St Leonards graduates go on to university. Approximately one third of the graduating class studies in Scotland, one third studies elsewhere in the United Kingdom and the remaining third studies overseas.

== Headmistresses and headmasters ==
For the first 124 years, (when the school was an all-girls school) the Head of St Leonards was always a woman. The first Headmaster was appointed in 2003.

- 1877–1882: Dame Louisa Lumsden
- 1882–1896: Dame Frances Dove
- 1896–1907: Julia Mary Grant
- 1907–1921: Mary Bentinck-Smith
- 1922–1938: Katharine Howard McCutcheon
- 1938–1955: Janet A. Macfarlane
- 1956–1970: Janet S. A. Macaulay
- 1970–1987: Martha Hamilton (Mrs R Steedman)
- 1988–2000: Mary James
- 2001–2003: Wendy Bellars
- 2003–2008: Robert A. J. Tims
- 2008 – April 2021: Michael Carslaw
- April 2021 – August 2021: Dawn Pemberton-Hislop (Acting Headmistress)
- From August 2021: Simon Brian

== Fees ==
School fees at St Leonards for the 2020–2021 academic year ranged from £9,552 to £15,474 for day pupils and £24,651 to £37,452 for boarders. These fees include tuition, lodging for boarders, meals (lunch for day pupils, full-board for boarders) as well some textbooks and the majority of extra-curricular activities. However, there are some additional extras not included and charged at a supplementary rate.

The school does offer financial assistance to a limited number of Senior and Sixth Form pupils who demonstrate sufficient financial need – covering up to 100% of fees. While St Leonards does award scholarships to pupils who've demonstrated excellence in a variety of fields, the scholarship is based on merit and does not result in a reduction of fees.

== Notable alumni ==
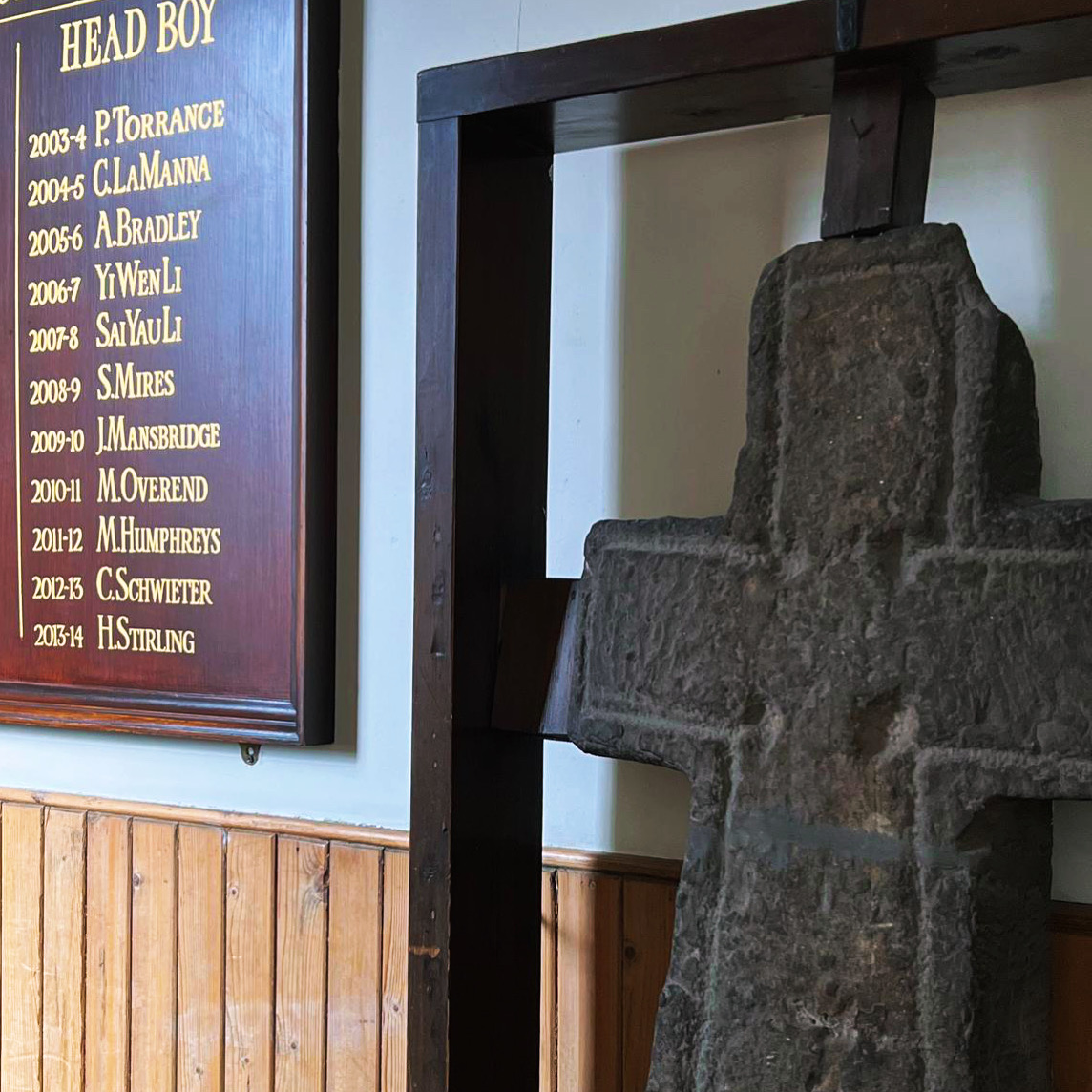
Head Boys at St Leonards School in St Andrews

Former St Leonards pupils are known as St Leonards Seniors. St Leonards organises various reunions and events for Seniors in St Andrews and select cities around the world, while also providing online networking tools.

- Eleanor Acland – British Liberal Party politician, suffragist, and novelist.
- Betty Harvie Anderson (Baroness Skrimshire) – Conservative politician and peer
- Betty Archdale – early barrister; pioneer of women's education in Australia
- Helen Archdale – feminist, suffragist and journalist
- Elspeth Barker – author of "O, Caledonia!", formerly married to poet George Barker
- Wilhelmina Barns-Graham – leading abstract painter, based in St Ives, Cornwall
- Susan MacTaivsh Best - salon host
- Hilda Bruce – zoologist, discoverer of the Bruce effect
- Agnata Butler (née Ramsay) – classicist, among the first generation of women to take the Classical Tripos examinations at the University of Cambridge
- Hazel Byford, Baroness Byford DBE – Shadow Minister for Food and Rural Affairs
- Jean Hunter Cowan – artist
- Noël Eadie – soprano
- Jackie Forster (Jacqueline Moir Mackenzie) – actress, TV personality, feminist and lesbian campaigner
- Louisa Garrett Anderson – medical pioneer, social reformer, suffragist
- Fiona Gaunt – television actor, mother of Genevieve Gaunt
- Elizabeth Girling – Spanish Civil War veteran, political activist and charity campaigner
- Kitty McKane Godfree – Wimbledon Ladies' Singles Champion, 1924 and 1926
- Anji Hunter, Baroness Hunter of Auchenreoch – Labour peer
- Christina Keith (1889–1963) – academic and author
- Kristin Linklater – vocal coach to many well-known actors, based at Columbia University
- Anne Macaulay (née Russell) – musicologist, antiquarian and author
- Chrystal Macmillan – barrister, feminist and pacifist
- Catherine Marshall – suffragist and pacifist
- Elizabeth Mavor – writer
- Anna McElligott – musician
- Max McElligott – lead singer of Wolf Gang
- Kathleen Ollerenshaw DBE – mathematician and educationalist
- Tessa Ransford – founder of the Scottish Poetry Library
- Louise Robey – actress, singer, model
- Sally Shaw, professor of sport managements in New Zealand
- Rosabelle Sinclair – honoured in U.S. Lacrosse Hall of Fame, Baltimore
- Dr. Alice Stewart (née Naish) – pioneering epidemiologist
- Josephine Stewart Leading sports person, early Lacrosse and lifer at St Leonards
- Stella Tennant – supermodel
- Margaret Haig Thomas (Lady Rhondda) – founder of political magazine Time and Tide
- Penny Thomson – film producer and former Director of Edinburgh International Film Festival
- Fiona Watson – UN official killed in the Canal Hotel bombing, Baghdad
- Audrey Withers – editor of Vogue from 1940 to 1960

== See also ==
- St Leonard's College
