= The Lumsden Club =

Women's club at the University of St Andrews, Scotland

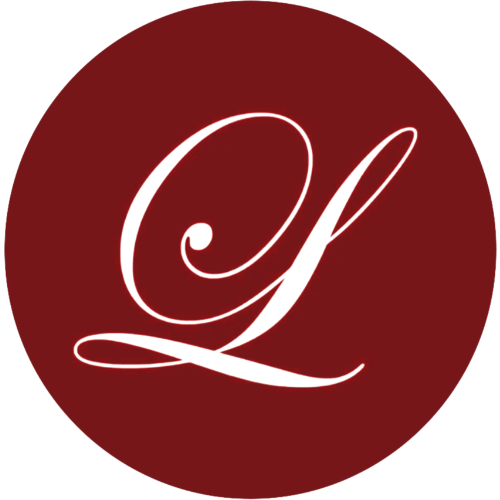
- The Lumsden Club's official logo
- Formation: 2001
- Legal status: Charity
- Location: St Andrews, Scotland

The Lumsden Club is an all female club at the University of St Andrews, Scotland. The club is a registered charity that aims to support women and children's charities and the arts, both locally and abroad. It is named in honour of Dame Louisa Lumsden, founding female warden at University Hall, the university's first hall of residence for women.

== Membership ==
The club consists of approximately 40 members, with a maximum of 10 students from each year group. The club was founded by Libby Hart and Emmeline Kuhn in 2001, and the club's alumni include a number of well known personalities, such as Catherine, Princess of Wales.

Potential members of the club are recruited during their first year of university. Prospective candidates are subject to two rounds of interviews to ascertain their suitability for membership. Interviewees are informed of the outcome of their application by way of a letter, traditionally placed under the candidate's door.

Members of The Lumsden Club meet weekly to discuss club affairs. Other than actively engaging in meetings, members are expected to fundraise money for charitable causes, volunteer locally in the Fife area and fulfil artistic endeavours.

=== Committee ===
At the end of each academic year, an AGM is held where a new committee is democratically elected by the whole club. Committee positions include President, Vice-President, Secretary, Treasurer, Charities Convener, Events Convener, Arts Convener, Alumnae Officer, Recruitment Officer, Public Relations Officer, Social Convener and Sponsorship Officer.

== Events ==
The club hosts a number of charity fundraising events throughout the academic year, recurrently donating to Fife Women's Aid. The most high profile of these events are the annual 'Pimm's Garden Party' and the 'Lumsden Leadership Summit'.
