= New Park School =

Location
- Hepburn Gardens; St Andrews, Fife, KY16 9LR; Scotland; 56.333487°N 2.815966°W

Information
- Type: Preparatory school
- Established: 1933
- Founder: Cuthbert Dixon
- Closed: 2005
- Gender: Mixed
- Houses: Dixon, Hunter, Macleod, Scott

New Park School was an independent preparatory school in St Andrews, Fife, Scotland. The school was founded in 1933 by Cuthbert Dixon, previously a teacher at Merchiston Castle School, and closed in 2005.

The school was situated at Hepburn Gardens, a residential area of St Andrews. Additionally, the school owned playing fields at Priory Acres off the Canongate, on the other side of the Kinness Burn. In 1986, part of the playing fields were put on the market for residential development. The school continued to use the remaining playing fields until it closed in 2005.

Initially the school had 13 boys, all of whom were day pupils. Within a few years, the school had expanded, and by 1938 there were 20 pupils including 10 boarders. Numbers continued to increase, particularly in the post-war period.

In the 1970s, New Park admitted its first girls. By the time the school closed in 2005, there were roughly equal numbers of boys and girls attending. As times changed, boarding became less popular, and by the mid-1990s, boarding at New Park had ceased.

== Merger with St Leonards ==
When the other preparatory school in St Andrews, the previously girls-only St Leonards Junior School began accepting boys, New Park struggled to recruit new pupils. St Leonards also suffered from a decline in pupil numbers, and talks between the schools continued for several years. In March 2005 it was announced that New Park would merge with St Leonards Junior School, to form St Leonards-New Park. The merged school would use the St Leonards campus. The announcement was met with a mixed reaction from New Park parents.

St Leonards announced a major redevelopment of their junior school and changed its name from St Leonard's-New Park to St Leonard's Junior School. The project, commencing in June 2011, had an estimated cost of £2.5m, and was funded by the New Park Educational Trust. The New Park name will be used for the redeveloped area of the St Leonard's site.

== New Park Educational Trust ==
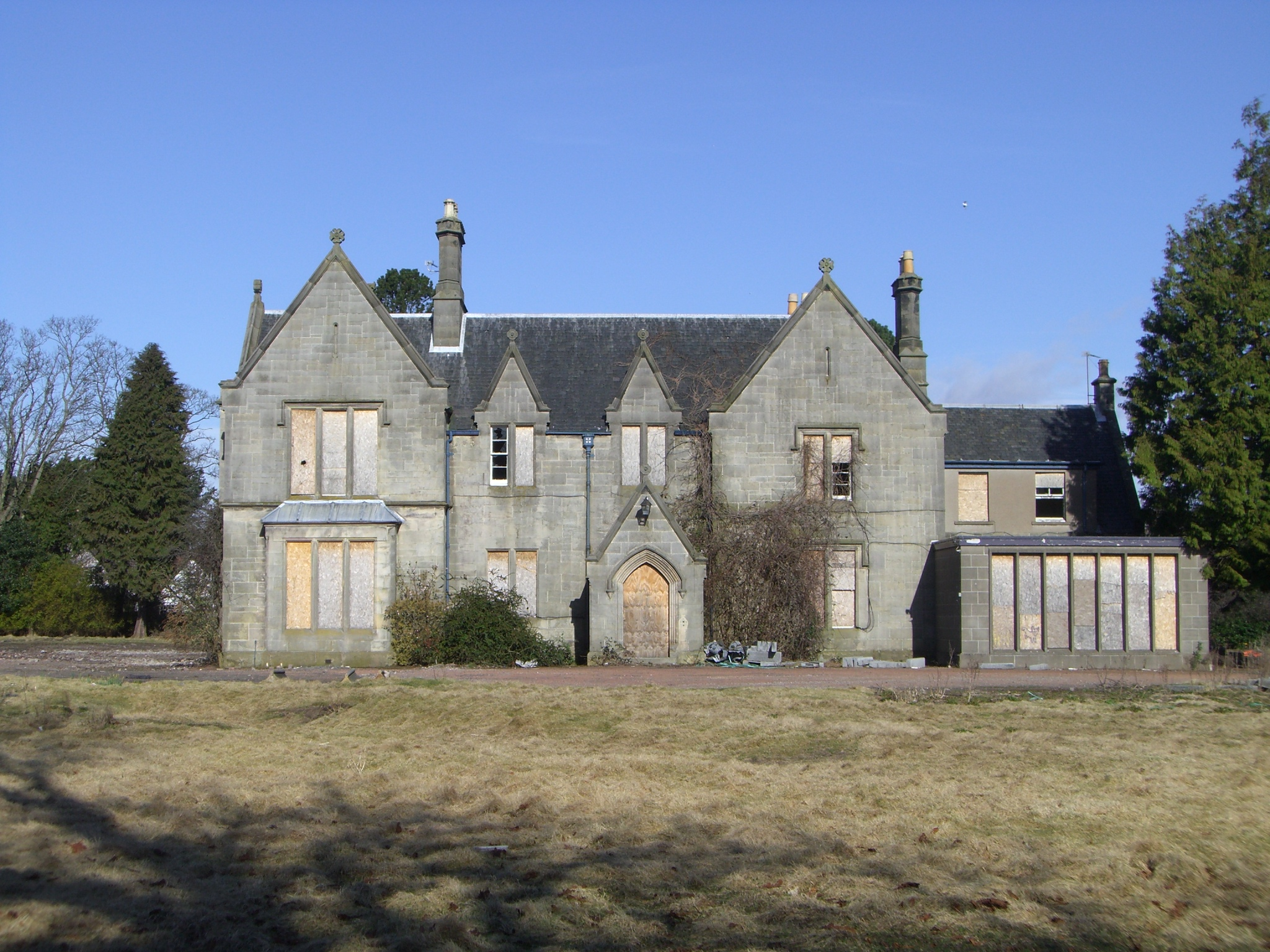
New Park School, March 2011

The original New Park site (excluding the original house, which formed part of the main school building) was sold for development. The money raised is managed by the New Park Educational Trust, which supports local educational projects. The Trust still owns the original house, which has been converted into flats for rental to families involved in education in St Andrews.

=== Headmasters ===
- 1933–1949 Cuthbert Dixon
- 1949–1969 Roderick Macleod
- 1969–1976 Adrian Blocksidge
- 1976–1984 Alan Elliott
- 1984–1995 Michael Wareham
- 1995–2005 Andrew Donald (subsequently Head of St Leonards-New Park)
