= Christina Keith =

Scottish academic and author

Christina Keith (12 January 1889 - 1963) was a pioneering Scottish academic and author who travelled to France towards the end of the First World War as a lecturer to the troops. With a friend, she was one of the first women to explore the devastated battlefields after the Armistice. She left a memoir of her experiences.

== Early life and academic career ==
Christina Keith was born in Thurso on 12 January 1889, the eldest child of Peter Keith and Katie Bruce. One of her brothers was the artist David Barrogill Keith (1891-1979). She showed early academic promise and was dux of Miller Institute in Thurso at the age of 14. She attended St Leonards School in St Andrews and then Miss Williamson’s School in Edinburgh. Her parents supported her desire for higher education although this was still unusual for women. Even more unusual was her decision to study the traditionally male subject of Classics at Edinburgh University despite not even knowing the Greek alphabet. She graduated in 1910 with First Class Honours in Latin, Greek and classical archaeology. Of the ten others in her class, nine were men. Christina then spent three years studying at Newnham College, Cambridge, and was placed in the First Class in both parts of the Classical Tripos. As a woman, she was allowed to sit the exams and was awarded a grade but was not permitted to graduate with a degree. She was then appointed lecturer in Classics at Armstrong College, Newcastle, taking up her post in October 1914.

== First World War ==
Sir Henry Hadow, Principal of Armstrong College, was appointed Director of Education for the army’s new education scheme, run by the YMCA, in July 1918. Soon afterwards Christina took up a post as staff lecturer, based in Dieppe, France. She taught English, languages and other subjects to soldiers who were ‘behind the lines’, and was living among the troops when the Armistice was declared. Her memoir ‘A Fool in France’, published in full in 'War Classics: the remarkable memoir of Scottish scholar Christina Keith on the Western Front', paints a vivid picture her life and work among soldiers of all social backgrounds. Given a few days’ leave, she and a female companion were among the first women to travel across devastated battlefields still littered with the debris of war once the guns had fallen silent.

== Later career and publications ==
The education scheme was disbanded in spring 1919, and Christina returned to England and took up a new position as Senior Classics Tutor in St Hilda’s College, Oxford. She remained there for the rest of her academic life, and also taught inmates in Oxford prison. In 1942 Christina left Oxford and returned to Thurso, where she focussed on the study of Scottish literature and history. She wrote many newspaper articles and published 'The Russet Coat', a study of the works of Robert Burns, and 'The Romance of Barrogill Castle', a history of the castle now known as the Castle of Mey. Her final book, a biography of Walter Scott titled 'The Author of Waverley' was published posthumously. She died in 1963. The Christina Keith prize was established in the same year.

== Selected works ==
- 'The Romance of Barrogill Castle, the Queen Mother’s new home', Christina Keith, 1954
- 'The Russet Coat: a critical study of Burns’ poetry and of its background', Christina Keith, 1956
- 'The Author of Waverley: a study in the personality of Walter Scott', Christina Keith, 1964

== Bibliography ==
- Johnston, Flora (3 March 2014). War Classics: The Remarkable Memoir of Scottish Scholar Christina Keith on the Western Front. The History Press. ISBN 978-0-7509-5688-8.
- University of Cambridge (27 June 1974). Cambridge University Calendar 1973–74. Cambridge University Press. ISBN 9780521203968.
