= Lesley Abdela =

British journalist

Lesley Julia Abdela MBE (born 1945) is an English journalist and author.

== Biography ==
Abdela was born in 1945 in London and educated at Queen Anne's School, Chatelard School, Hammersmith College of Art and Building and the London College of Printing.

Abdela won the UK Woman of Europe award for work seeking the empowerment of women in Central and Eastern Europe and in 1996 was the first Political Editor for Cosmopolitan magazine. In 2006, Abdela was voted into the New Statesman's poll "Top 50 Heroes of Our Time". She was chosen July 2007 United States Bureau of Educational and Cultural Affairs European Alumni of the Month. In the Queen's Birthday Honours 1990 Abdela was appointed as a Member of the Order of the British Empire for "services to the advancement of Women in Politics and Local Government".

In 2007, Abdela was reported by the BBC as having found the grave of Barbara Bodichon in the tiny churchyard of Brightling, East Sussex, about 50 miles (80 km) from London. It was in a state of disrepair, with its railings rusted and breaking away, and the inscription on the tomb almost illegible. A fund for its repair was underway. The historian Dr Judith Rowbotham at Nottingham Trent University issued a further appeal for funds to restore the grave and its surroundings. About £1,000 was raised. The money raised by the village was used to sand-blast the railings and repaint them, and to clean the granite tomb.

Abdela has been:

- Member of the Governing Board of the British Council (1995–2000)
- Governor of Nottingham Trent University (1997–2000)
- Board Member of the International Institute for Environment and Development (1992–1997)
- Co-founder and Leader of 'The 300 GROUP' for Women In Politics (1980–1985)
- Liberal Party Parliamentary Candidate for the General Election of 1979
- Policy Researcher for House of Commons and House of Lords (1977–1979)

Abdela is a senior partner in Shevolution, a gender equality consultancy, and lives in Burwash, East Sussex.

== Works ==
- Abdela, Lesley and Tim Symonds (ed.), Breaking through the glass ceilings., Metropolitan Authorities Recruitment Agency, (1991), Solihull. ISBN 1-874025-99-1.
- Abdela, Lesley, Do it! : walk the talk : a practical guide for employers on how to change the gender culture in the workplace., Metropolitan Authorities Recruitment Agency, (1995) Solihull, ISBN 1-874025-30-4.
- Abdela, Lesley, What women want : a guide to creating a better and fairer life for women in the UK,, The Body Shop, (1994).
- Abdela, Lesley, A strange old mother : no press pass for women’s magazines. Violations of rights in Britain; 15,, Charter88 Enterprises, (1994), London. ISBN 1-873311-99-0.
- Abdela, Lesley, Women with X appeal : women politicians in Britain today., Macdonald Optima. (1989), London. ISBN 0-356-17184-1.
