= Elizabeth Girling =

- Born: Elizabeth Aytoun; 7 March 1913; Birmingham
- Died: 24 March 2005 (aged 92); Edinburgh
- Education: Oxford University
- Known for: Spanish Civil War veteran; political activist; charity campaigner

Elizabeth Jean St Clair Girling (née Aytoun; 7 March 1913 – 24 March 2005) was an English veteran of the Spanish Civil War, a political activist and a charity campaigner.

== Early life and education ==
Elizabeth Aytoun was born 7 March 1913 in Birmingham, UK, to Dorothy Henderson and Rev Robert Aytoun, an Old Testament scholar. Her father died when she was seven, and Edward Cadbury became her guardian. Cadbury funded Girling's education, and she attended St Leonards School in St Andrews, followed by Oxford University, where she studied English Literature; one of her tutors at Oxford was J R R Tolkien.

While at Oxford, Girling became a communist and would go on to work for both the League of Nations Association and Transport and General Workers' Union after graduation.

== Spanish Civil War ==
Girling travelled to Spain in 1937 to join the resistance against General Franco's uprising. Based in the Pyrenees, her main responsibility was caring for children evacuated due to the war. While in Spain, she met Frank Girling, then a Cambridge student working for the International Voluntary Service for Peace. They married in 1939.

== Activism and charity work ==
Having left Spain, Girling opened the family home, Ashintully Castle, to refugees from Eastern Europe and London during World War Two, while Frank was posted first to the east coast of Scotland and subsequently to India.

After the war, the couple moved around England, Frank's work as a social anthropologist and academic taking them to university cities including Cambridge, Oxford, Leeds and Sheffield, before eventually settling in Edinburgh.

Girling remained a committed socialist and was a firm supporter of the Labour party. She founded the Partisan Coffee House in Victoria Street, Edinburgh, in 1959 which would become a well-known meeting place for left-wing intellectuals and artists throughout the 1960s.

Girling was also a campaigner for improved services for allergy sufferers in Scotland, and was a founding member of the Lothian Allergy Support Group. Representing this organisation, she petitioned the Scottish Parliament to establish specialist clinics for allergy sufferers in Scotland.
