= Cara Gascoigne =

British physical educator

- Born: Caroline Eleanor Gascoigne; July 1888; Devon
- Died: 1984
- Occupation(s): Teacher, physical educator

Caroline "Cara" Eleanor Gascoigne (3 July 1888 – 1984) was a British physical educator. From 1912 to 1921, she coached at Sweet Briar College, as director of physical training; under her leadership, Sweet Briar students played in the first women's intercollegiate hockey, basketball, and lacrosse games ever held in Virginia. She was inducted into the Sweet Briar College Athletics Hall of Fame posthumously, in 2007.

== Early life ==
Gascoigne was born in Devon, the daughter of William Birch Gascoigne and Caroline Malet Veale Gascoigne. Her father was a clergyman; her mother was born to English parents in South Africa. Cara Gascoigne attended Queen Anne's School, Caversham in 1907, and graduated from the Bergman-Österberg Physical Training College in Dartford, Kent, where she was a classmate of fellow lacrosse coach Rosabelle Sinclair.

== Career ==
Gascoigne was director of physical training at Sweet Briar College from 1912 to 1923, except while she was serving as a W.A.A.C. during World War I. During and after the war, she worked with convalescent soldiers in England. During her time at the college, she started one of the first women's lacrosse clubs in the United States. She also played violin in Sweet Briar's orchestra, appeared in campus dramatics, and taught lacrosse at a girls' summer camp in Hancock, New Hampshire. She coached her students in Virginia's first women's intercollegiate sports events, in field hockey and basketball. After 1923, she returned to England and taught at her alma mater Queen Anne's, where she continued to coach women's lacrosse and play violin "in several orchestras", and in Eastbourne rode her bicycle regularly into her eighties.

== Personal life ==
Gascoigne died in 1984, in her nineties, in England. She was inducted into the Sweet Briar College Athletics Hall of Fame in 2007. She is also in the Bergman Österberg Union Hall of Fame.
