= Penny Thomson =

Filipino Channel 4 broadcast producer (1950–2007)

EIFF director
- In office 1991–1994

Personal details
- Born: 14 November 1950 Manila, Metro Manila, Philippines
- Died: 9 July 2007 (aged 56) Edinburgh, Scotland, United Kingdom
- Spouse: Allan Ross (1978–2007)

Penny Thomson (14 November 1950, Manila – 9 July 2007, Edinburgh) was a producer for Britain's Channel Four and former EIFF director.

She attended St. Leonard's School for Girls at St Andrews, Scotland. She became a production assistant, learning her craft with Murray Grigor and Patrick Higson. During this time she met musician and sculptor, Allan Ross whom she married on 4 July 1978.

Her career in film progressed through one of the earliest films made for Channel Four, The Work They Say Is Mine, to a cameo appearance in Gregory's Girl. During this time, Thomson and Ross moved to a farmhouse at Avonbridge, setting up Avonbridge Film Productions and producing commercials on which future directors and producers cut their teeth. At the Scottish Film Production Fund, which she ran for two years, she secured funding for Margaret Tait's film, Blue Black Permanent. In 1991, Thomson was appointed director of the Edinburgh International Film Festival (EIFF). Thomson took over the Festival and during her three years at the helm brought stability back to the organisation.

In the 1990s, Thomson and Ross moved to York Road in Edinburgh. With the move came a new working partnership. Together they devised, pitched for and won many commissions for installations, theatre pieces, and award statuettes. For 12 years, they provided the Viking longship, burnt annually on Calton Hill in culmination of the Torchlight Procession which heralds in Edinburgh's four-day Hogmanay celebration.

In later years, she worked on script development and consultancy. She was a tireless worker for BAFTA Scotland, serving on its committee for many years. She supported the Edinburgh Film Focus from its inception and played a key role in advisory panels. The most recent meeting, she chaired from a wheelchair with indomitable style. She was chair of the Boilerhouse Theatre Company, a contributor to the List magazine and to BBC Scotland and was a board member and UK representative on the European producers' programme, EAVE.

Terminally ill with breast cancer Penny Thomson and Allan Ross celebrated their 29th wedding anniversary in St Columba's Hospice, Edinburgh, with champagne and chocolate cake. She died 5 days later, aged 56.
