= Mary Bentinck Smith =

Mary Bentinck Smith Litt.D.
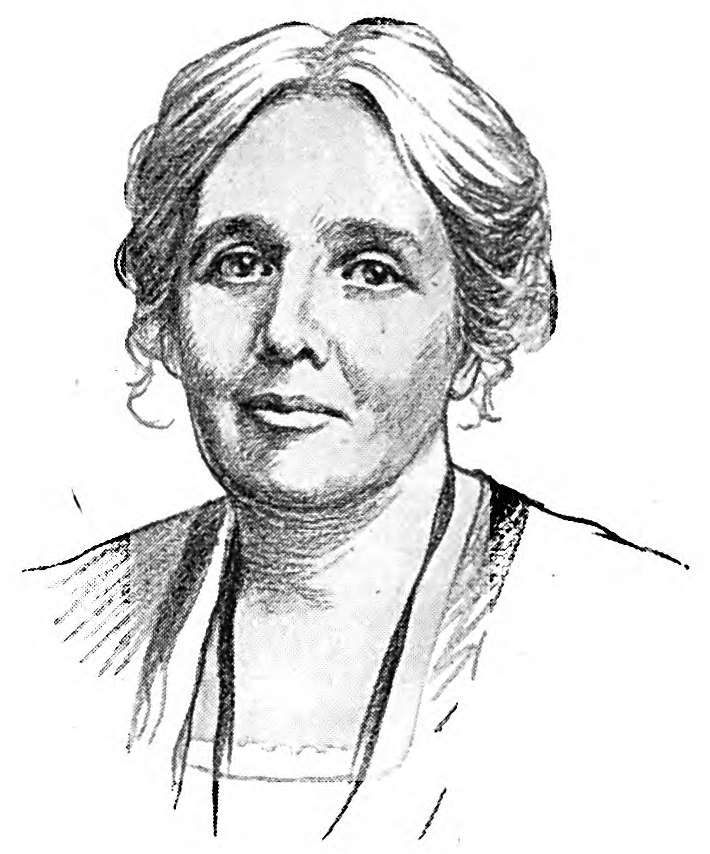
- Born: 2 November 1864; Hamburg, Germany
- Died: 20 December 1921 (aged 57); St Andrews, Scotland
- Occupation: Headmistress

Academic background
- Education: Girton College

Academic work
- Institutions: St Leonards School; Avery Hill College; Girton College; Royal Holloway College; Victoria College, Belfast

Mary Bentinck Smith (1864–1921) was a schoolmistress, headmistress of St Leonards School from 1907 to 1921.

== Life ==
Mary Bentinck Smith was born on 2 November 1864 at Hamburg, the daughter of James Smith (1822–1906), a Congregationalist minister, and Wilhelmine Augusta Friederike Bentinck (1834–1922). She was educated privately in Sheffield, and at the Public Girls' School in Wiesbaden, before studying at Girton College, Cambridge. In 1893 she gained a first-class mark in the Medieval and Modern Languages tripos, and in 1894 also took the new English tripos.

From 1894 to 1897 Bentinck Smith was lecturer in Modern Languages at Victoria College, Belfast, and from 1897 to 1899 was a lecturer in Philology at Royal Holloway College. From 1899 to 1907 she was Director of Studies and Lecturer in Modern Languages at Girton College. She was appointed headmistress of St Leonards School in 1907.

She died on 20 December 1921 at St Andrews. Wrought iron gates at the entrance to Girton College were erected in her memory in 1924.

== Works ==
- (tr.) The language and meter of Chaucer by Bernhard ten Brink, 2nd. ed. revised by Friedrich Kluge. London: Macmillan & Co, 1901.
- (tr.) Northern hero legends by Otto Luitpold Jiriczek.
- (ed.) Deux héroines de la révolution française by Alphonse de Lamartine. Oxford: Clarendon Press, 1904.
- (ed.) The prologue and the Knight's tale by Chaucer. Cambridge: Cambridge University Press, 1908.
- Ad vitam : papers of a head mistress. London: J. Murray, 1927. Ed. by E. L. F. Lindsay and C. Bentinck Smith.

== See also ==
- William Bentinck-Smith, fraternal nephew
