= Elizabeth Mavor =

British novelist and biographer

Elizabeth Mavor (17 December 1927 – 22 May 2013) was a British novelist and biographer.

== Biography ==
Born in Glasgow, Scotland, in 1927, she was educated at St Leonard's School in St Andrews and St Anne's College, Oxford. She married the illustrator Haro Hodson, and had two sons and lived in Oxfordshire. She is best known as a novelist and wrote A Green Equinox (1973), which was shortlisted for the Booker Prize in the same year. Charlotte Mendelson described the book as 'funny and brave and moving and absolutely bonkers.' Her work as an historian and biographer includes The Ladies of Llangollen and Fanny Kemble: The American Journals.

== Bibliography ==
- The Virgin Mistress: A Life of the Duchess of Kingston (1964)
- The Ladies of Llangollen: A Study in Romantic Friendship (1971)
- The Grand Tour of William Beckford (1986)
- The Grand Tours of Katherine Wilmot: France 1801–3 and Russia 1805–7 (1992) (Compiler and Editor).
- A Year with the Ladies of Llangollen
- Fanny Kemble: The American Journals (1990)
- The Captain's Wife: The South American Journals of Maria Graham 1821–23 (1993)
- Summer in the Greenhouse (1959), novel
- The Temple of Flora (1961), novel
- The Redoubt (1967), novel
- A Green Equinox (1973), novel
- The White Solitaire (1988), novel
