= Susan MacTavish Best =

American businesswoman

Susan MacTavish Best is an American business woman who is the founder and CEO of Posthoc, an organization that hosts salon gatherings, and works as an advisor to CEOs and founders. She is also the founder of The Salon Host, a 21st Century educational guide to hosting salons and analog in-person events. She was previously the founder of Best Public Relations and Living MacTavish, a lifestyle guide. She has become known for hosting salon-style gatherings in Los Angeles, DC, London, San Francisco, New York and Svalbard.

MacTavish Best is a vocal proponent of people spending time together in real life in an analog style despite her decades working in Silicon Valley.

== Early life and education ==
MacTavish Best was born on Prince Edward Island, Canada. MacTavish Best's mother is Laurie MacTavish Best and her father is the Canadian scientist and politician Charles Alexander Best. She is the granddaughter of Charles Best, the co-discoverer of insulin.

She attended St Leonards School for eight years in St Andrews, Fife, Scotland, and grew up at Pitfour Castle. She graduated from Hamilton College with a bachelor's degree in History and won the George A. Watrous Prize in Poetry. She spent one year at Oxford University where she was co-editor of the University's magazine, The Isis.

== Career ==
MacTavish Best created and edited POSTHOC, one of the first online guides to San Francisco in the 90's, after studying at night school at San Francisco State University’s Multimedia Center. Years later, she relaunched Posthoc as an organisation and community that hosts salons worldwide.

MacTavish Best founded Best Public Relations, a boutique Silicon Valley PR agency, in 1998. The company focused on working with technology companies and represented dozens of long-term clients such as Craigslist for over 15 years, Esurance, Klout, Founders Fund, Smugmug, Olivia Travel, Quid, YouNoodle, VentureBeat, MainStreet, and Playfish through to their acquisition by Electronic Arts. She was also an executive producer for five seasons of craigslistTV, a documentary TV series spawned by craigslist. While representing Best Public Relations, MacTavish Best featured as a boss portraying herself on the unscripted BBC Children reality show "Beat the Boss USA" which aired in 2009.

In November 2013, MacTavish Best opened up a pop-up shop called "Living MacTavish" SoHo, New York City, where she made the contents of her life for sale. In the evening, she hosted informal salons, concerts and discussions while serving a homemade dinner for the attendees.

At the Posthoc salons, MacTavish Best weaves music and conversation together in front of an intimate audience. MacTavish Best interviews experts at Posthoc salons such as Marcelo Gleiser, Tim Draper Jennifer Doudna, Rana Foroohar, Tim Ferriss, Dean Karnazes, Barbara DeFina, Pete Worden, Andy Strominger, Amanda Feilding, Anne Case, Angus Denton, Ruby Wax, Fab Five Freddy, Lauren Jauregui, Philip Ball, Gary Hall Jr., Douglas Rushkoff, Paul Rosolie, Josh Tetrick, David Gelles, Leandra Medine, Emily Chang, Conor Dougherty, Erich Schwartzel, Robert Lustig, Michael Pollan, and Ken Goldberg. Musicians who have performed include Grammy winner Grace Weber, frontman for the Hothouse Flowers Liam O'Mainlai, Marianne Aya Omac and Gabe Harris (the son of Joan Baez), DJ duo Icarus, Aku (Florence & the Machine) and Queen Esther. Violinist Frank Almond performed on his once stolen Lipiński Stradivarius at a salon on prediction and risk where WorldQuant CEO Igor Tulchinsky and scientist Chris Mason were interviewed. MacTavish Best has also held poetry evenings in association with the Poetry Society of America.

In 2016, Calm launched their Sleep Stories app at a salon at MacTavish Best's home. In 2017, Calm was named Apple's App of the Year. In November 2023, Saturday Night Live produced a skit with Timothée Chalamet recording a Calm app sleep story that did not go as planned.

In 2018 MacTavish Best was named one of America's Top 100 Party Hosts by The Salonniere website for the second year in a row.

MacTavish Best has been recognised for her interior design style and fashion.

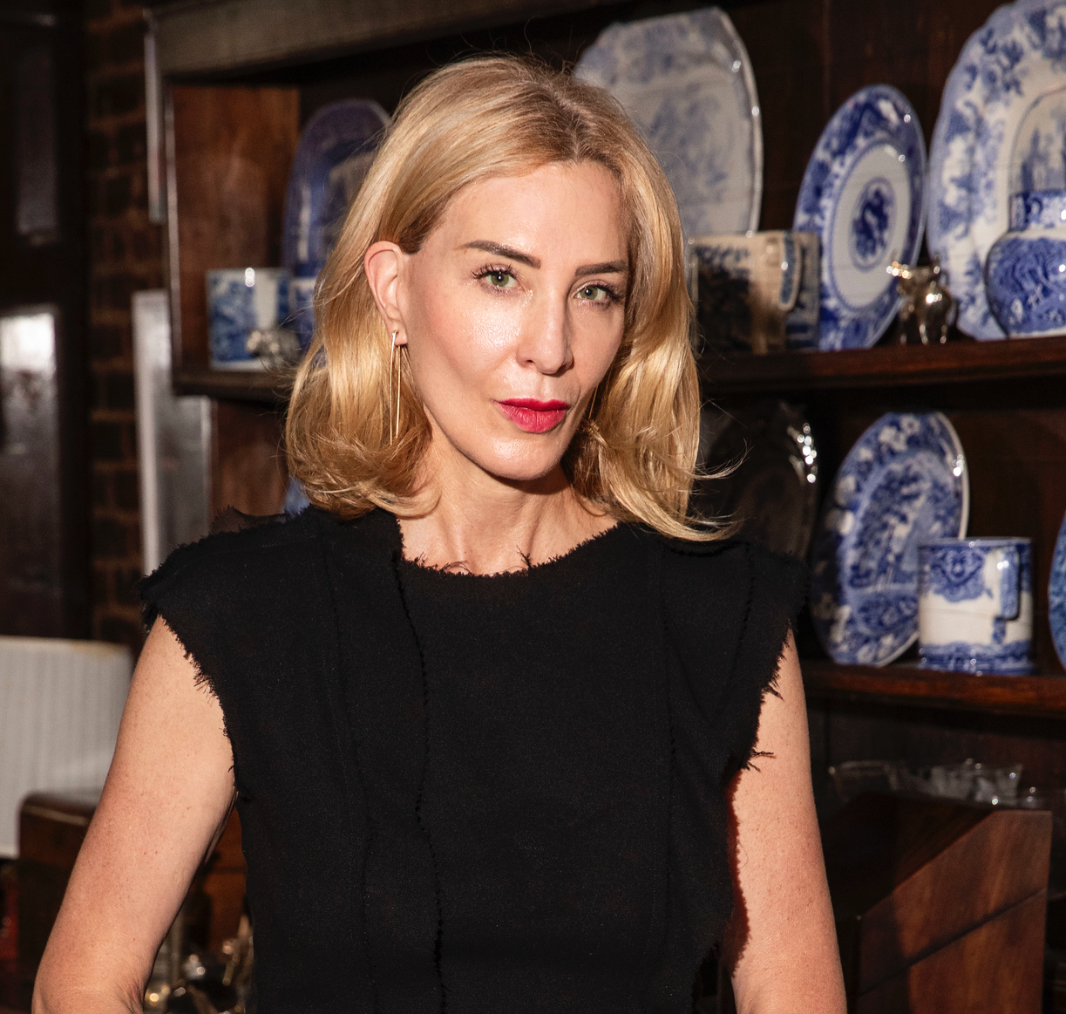
Susan MacTavish Best in her salon library, 2025

During Covid, MacTavish Best hosted dozens of digital salons on topics from economics to geopolitics to hosting a weekly mental health salon with Zak Williams. She also launched "The Salon Host" to inspire others to gather people in their community as the pandemic ended, and she has been credited for inspiring a new 21st Century trend of salon-hosting.

== Personal life ==
MacTavish Best spends time in Los Angeles’ Arts District, New York City and the remote far Northern California coast. In 2009, she was badly injured in a fire accident at her San Francisco apartment and she is a burn survivor.

In 2023 MacTavish Best was signed as a model to Grey Model Agency.
