= The Suffrage Oak =

Oak tree in Glasgow, Scotland

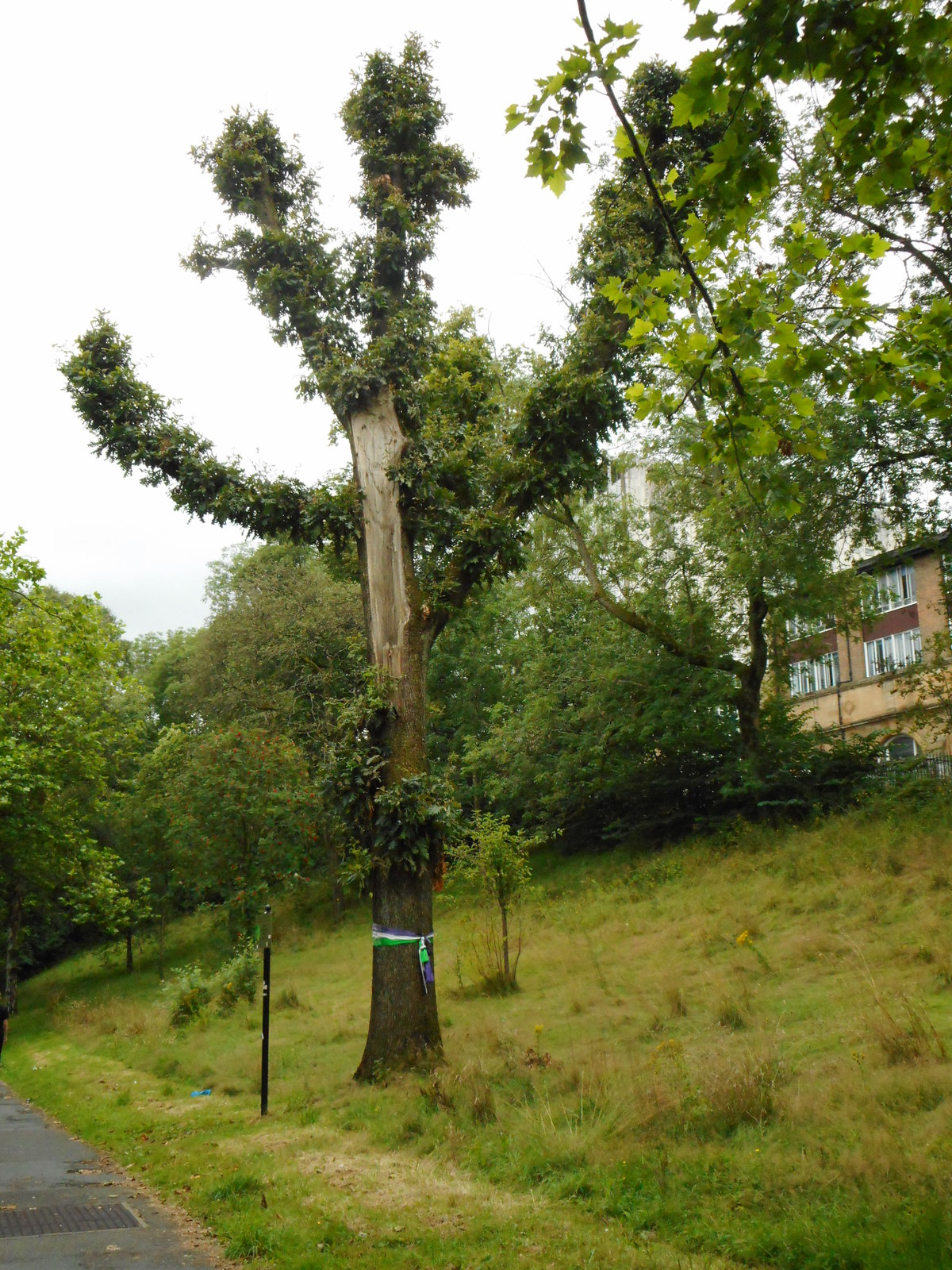
- The Suffrage Oak in 2019 following its damage from Storm Ophelia

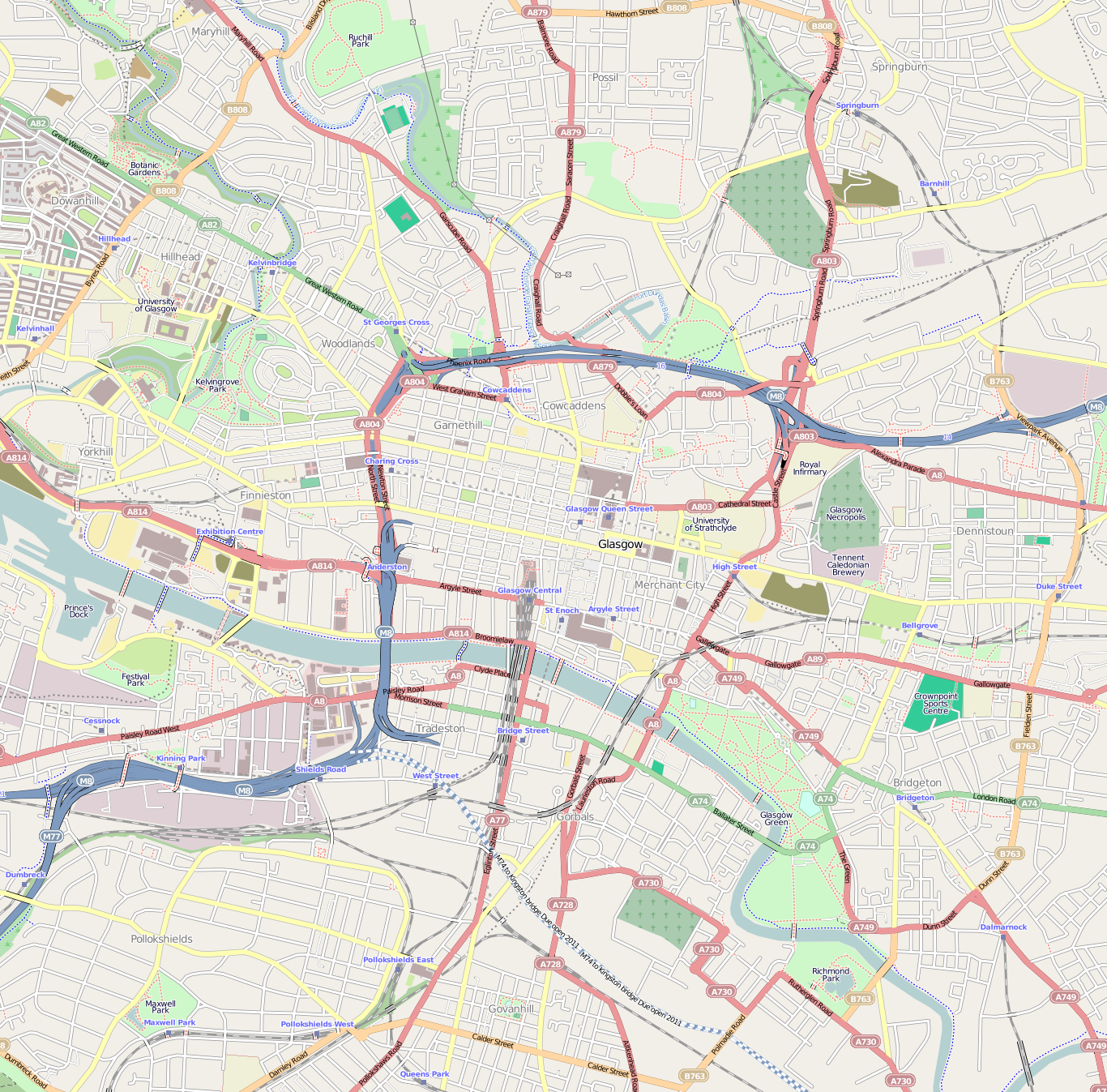
- Location within Central Glasgow
- Species: Hungarian oak (Quercus frainetto)
- Location: Glasgow, Scotland
- Coordinates: 55.8716°N 4.2854°W

The Suffrage Oak is a Hungarian oak tree (Quercus frainetto) in Kelvingrove Park in Glasgow, planted in 1918 by a number of female suffrage organisations to commemorate the passing on the Representation of the People Act in 1918. A plaque was added in 1995 by the Women's Committee of Glasgow City Council on International Women's Day. It was named Scotland's Tree of the Year in 2015 after being nominated by the Glasgow Women's Library.

== History ==
The tree was planted by Louisa Lumsden on behalf of various women's suffrage organisations on 20 April 1918 to commemorate the Representation of The People Act 1918, an Act of Parliament passed in February 1918.

The Representation of the People Act 1918 was passed to reform the electoral system in Great Britain and Ireland. The Act extended the vote in parliamentary elections to men aged over 21, whether or not they owned property, and to women aged over 30 who resided in the constituency while occupying land or premises with a rateable value above £5, or whose husbands did. At the same time, it extended the local government vote to include women aged over 30 on the same terms as men. It came into effect at the 1918 general election.

An event to plant the commemorative tree was listed in the Daily Record and Daily Mail's public notices on 19 April 1918 as 'Passing of the Representation of the People Act, 1918. Joint Local Celebration' and the Glasgow Herald reported the event was organised by the Glasgow Society of Women's Suffrage, Scottish Universities Suffrage Union, Women's Freedom League, Conservative and Unionist Women's Franchise and United Suffragists. This collective effort indicated the event was intended to unite and celebrate all women who fought for the vote, including representatives from all sides of the suffrage movement including Louisa Lumsden, Frances Melville, Eunice Murray, and Chrystal Macmillan who acted as 'commemoration orator' at the event.

The Sunday Post on 21 April 1918 reported on the event as follows:

A ceremony that was probably unique in the annals of the votes for women campaign took place this afternoon in Kelvingrove Park, where a young oak tree was planted by representatives of the Glasgow Women's Suffrage Societies, in commemoration of the passing of the Representation of the People Act. There was a goodly gathering of ladies, many of whom wore the tricolour and other sashes associated with the different Suffrage Societies.

Miss Frances Melville, who presided, described the granting of the vote to women as the most important change that had taken place in the long and chequered history the British Constitution

Miss Louisa Lumsden, L.L.D., who planted the tree, referred to the noble work of the pioneers of the movement, and pleaded for the setting aside of any narrowness, pettiness, class feeling, and prejudice in connection with the consideration of political and other questions.

— Glasgow Women and the Vote- Commemoration Tree Planted, The Post Sunday Special

After the ceremony, a "meeting of sympathisers with the women's cause was held in the Queens Rooms", which was a venue located at 1 La Belle Place, near Kelvingrove Park. The meeting was presided over by Chrystal Macmillan, and addressed by Louisa Lumsden, Frances Melville, Francis Simson, Bessie Semple & Helen Crawfurd.

== Recent history ==
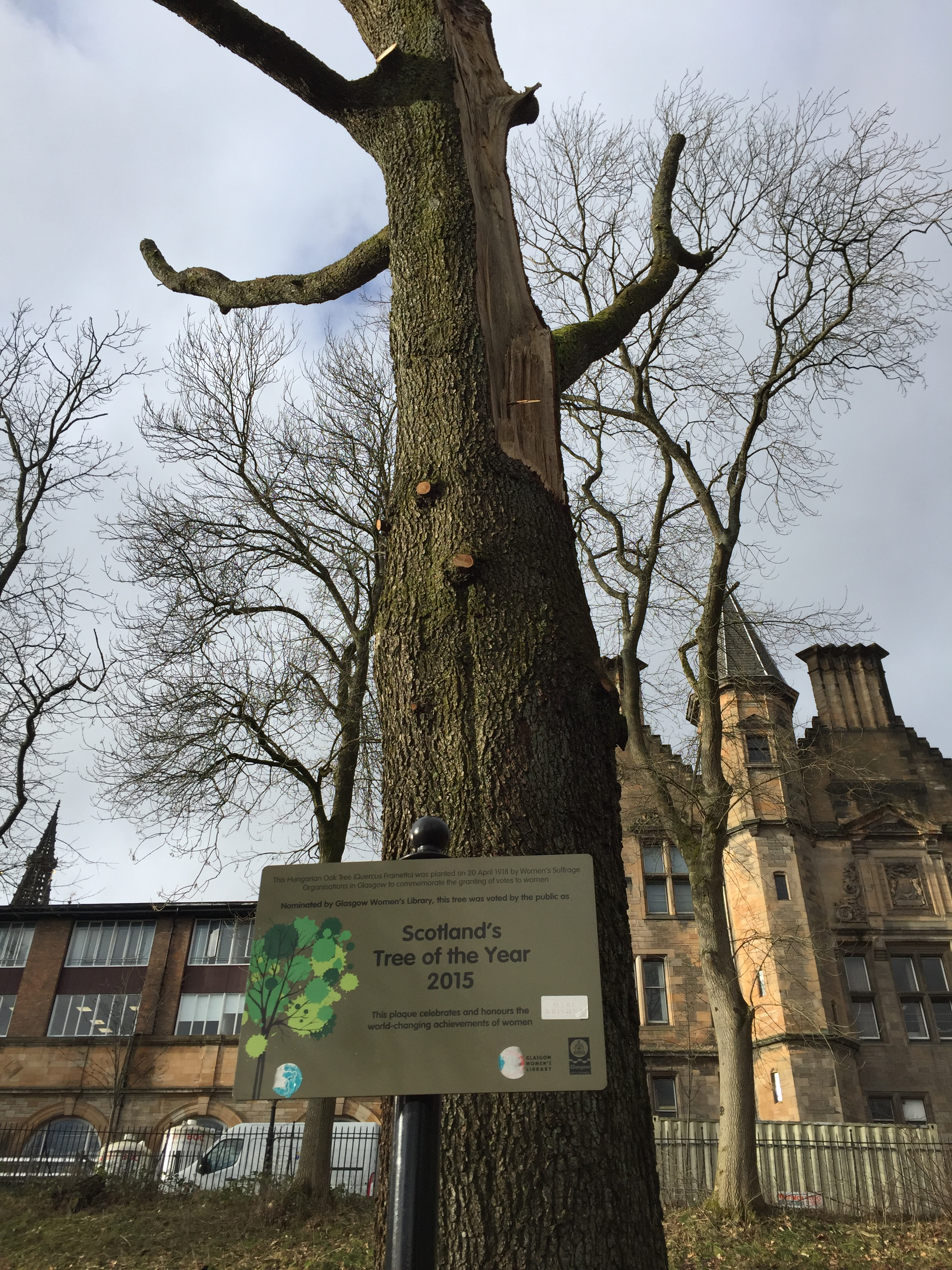
The Suffrage Oak in Kelvingrove Park, Glasgow

In October 2017 the tree lost around 30 per cent of its canopy during Storm Ophelia and suffered a large tear to its trunk. To save the tree and protect the public, Glasgow City Council had to reduce its height and rebalance the canopy. The off-cuts were gifted to the Glasgow Women's Library to create items for sale that celebrate the efforts of the suffragettes. These subsequently became earrings, chopping boards, coasters, magnets and trinket boxes, made by local artist Annie Graham.

== Recognition ==
On International Women's Day in 1995, the Women's Committee of Glasgow City Council erected a plaque next beside the tree which reads, 'This oak tree was planted by Women's Suffrage Organisations in Glasgow on 20 April 1918 to commemorate the granting of votes to women.'

In 2015 the tree was named Scotland's Tree of the Year by the Woodland Trust after being nominated by Glasgow Women's Library. The award was presented to representatives from Glasgow Women's Library at the Scottish Parliament in Edinburgh on 27 October 2015.

The Woodland Trust nominated the Suffrage Oak for the 2016 European Tree of the Year award.

== Image gallery ==
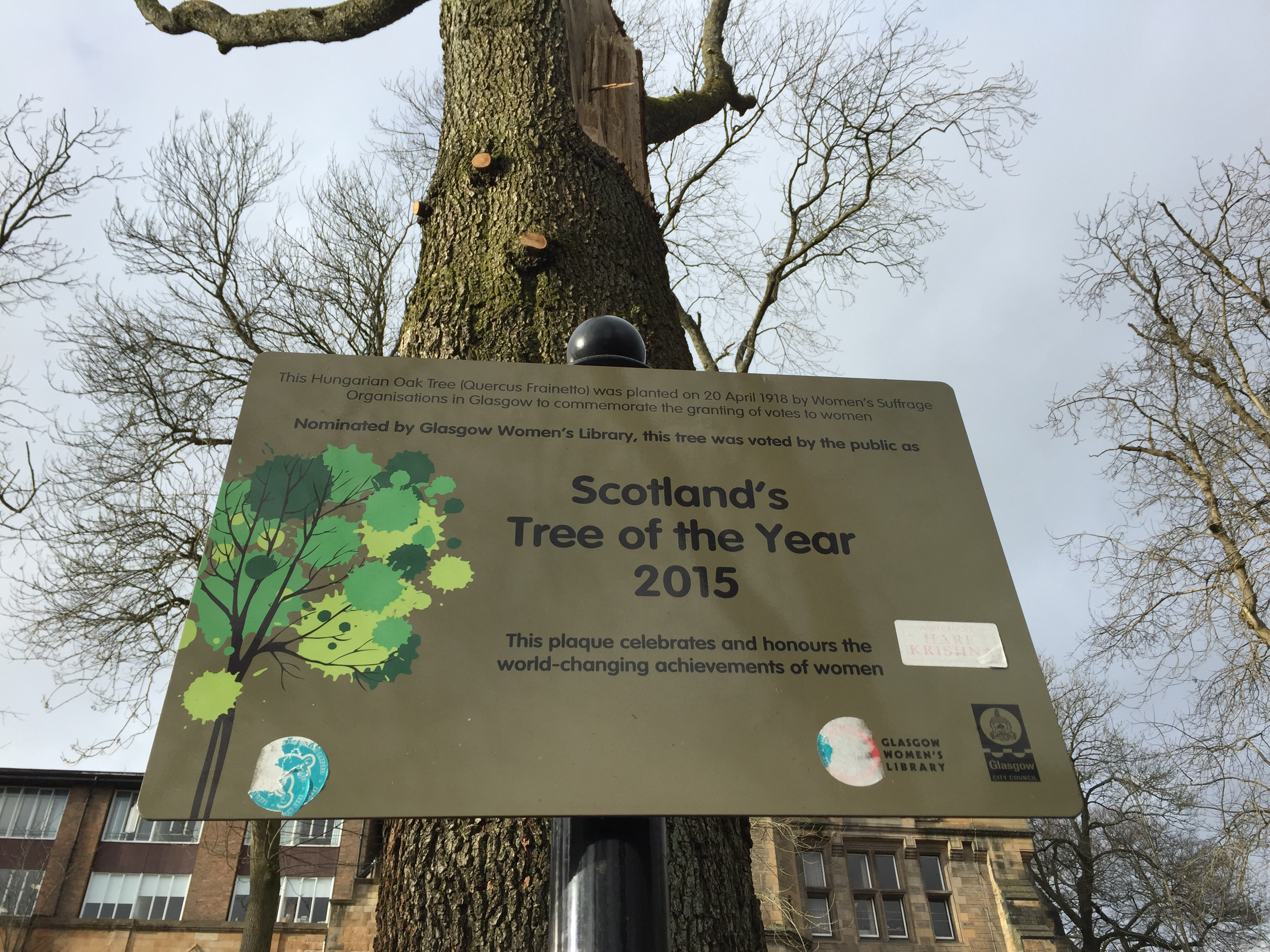
The tree with its Scotland's Tree of the Year 2015 sign.

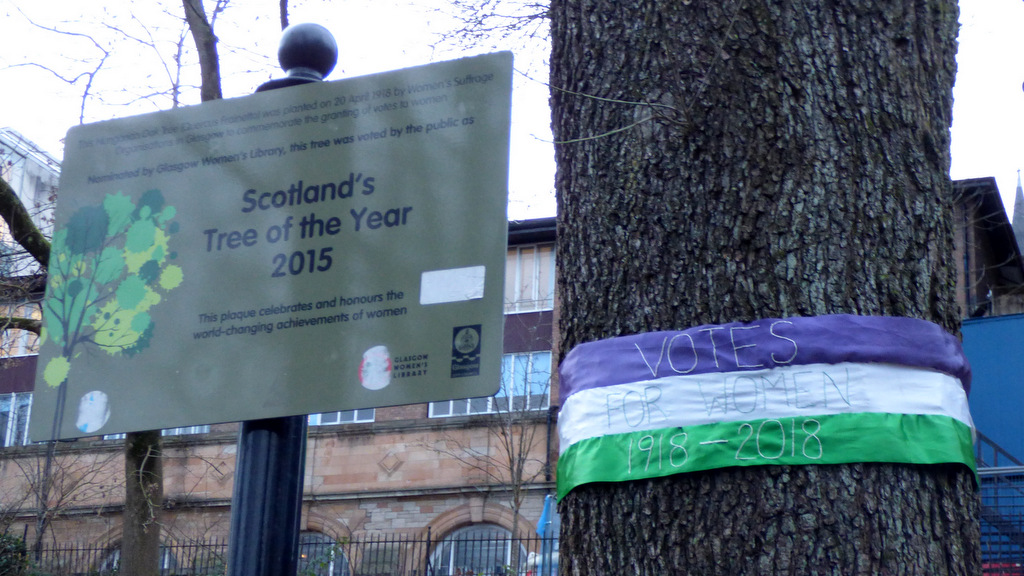
With a Suffragette tricolour band.

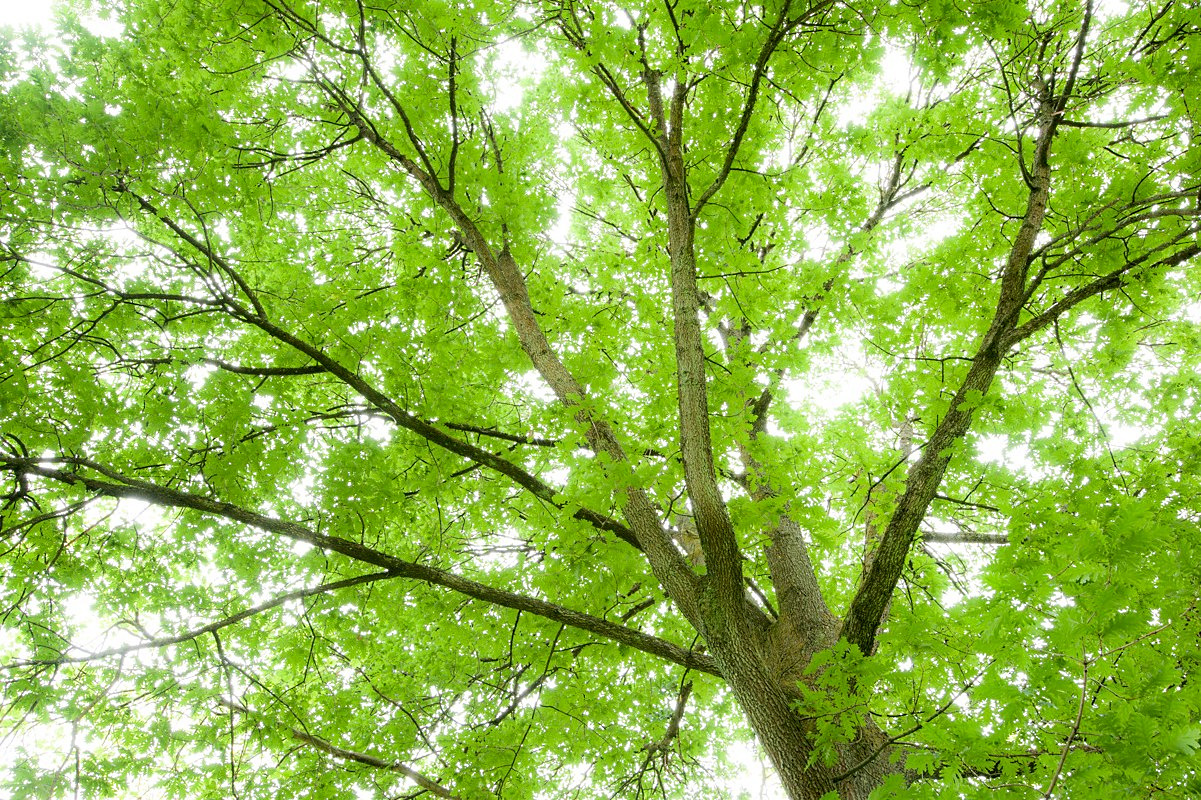
In 2015 before the storm damage.

== See also ==
- List of individual trees
