= Queen Anne's School =

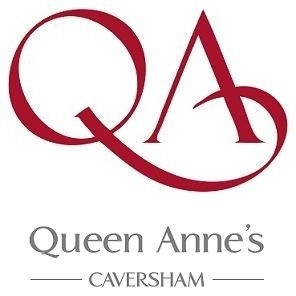

Location
- Henley Road; Caversham; Reading, Berkshire, RG4 6DX; England; 51°28′14″N 0°58′06″W

Information
- Type: Private boarding and day school
- Motto: Kind Hearts, Fierce Minds, Strong Spirits
- Religious affiliation: Church of England
- Established: 1894
- Local authority: Reading
- Department for Education URN: 110109 Tables
- Headmistress: Elaine Purves
- Gender: Girls
- Age: 11 to 18
- Enrolment: 450
- Houses: 4 Boarding Houses and 3 Day Houses
- Colours: Navy & Maroon
- Website: www.qas.org.uk

Queen Anne's School is a private boarding and day school for girls aged 11 to 18, situated on a 35-acre (14 ha) campus in Caversham. There are around 450 pupils. Nearly half are full, weekly or flexi-boarders. The school awards scholarships in academic subjects, sport, music, art and drama at ages 11 and 13 and at sixth form entry.

Queen Anne's is a member of the Girls' Schools Association and the Boarding Schools' Association. Queen Anne's was chosen as one of Tatler magazine's Top 225 prep and public schools 2010.

== History ==
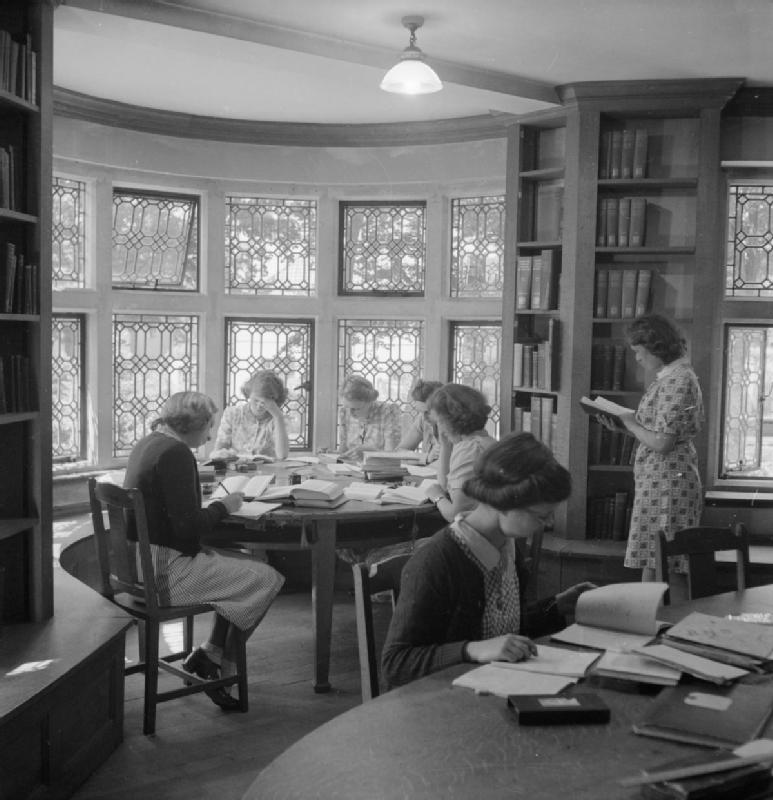
A group of girls carry out some private study in the library of Queen Anne's School in 1945

In 1698 eight merchants founded the Grey Coat Hospital, a Christian foundation. In 1706 the foundation received a royal charter from Queen Anne. In 1874 Grey Coat Hospital became a girls' school. The Grey Coat Hospital Foundation used part of its endowment to buy a mansion in Henley Road in Caversham which became Queen Anne's School in 1894. The site was previously occupied by Amersham Hall School. The history of the school is covered in a 2008 book by Daniel Talbot, former head of history, The Scarlet Runners: A Social History of Queen Anne's, Caversham.

== Facilities ==
Queen Anne's campus is a 35-acre (14 ha) site with landscaped gardens and playing fields immediately adjacent to the teaching and boarding accommodation. The facilities include a café for sixth formers and parents (opened 2009) and a Chapel, designed by Reginald Blomfield. In 2016, the school opened a new Sixth Form Centre.

The Main Block and Chapel at Queen Anne's School are Grade II listed buildings.

=== Sport ===
Lacrosse, tennis, swimming and netball are major sports at Queen Anne's and there is provision for most other sports either at the school or at local clubs. The school has produced Olympic and national-level sportswomen.

=== Music ===
The school's own groups include: Chamber Choir, Consort Choir, Saxoholics, Saxability, Orchestra, Chamber Orchestra, Wind Quartet, Flute Group, Swing Band and Junior Wind Band. The Chamber Choir, Saxoholics and Consort Choir have performed in New York, London and Rome.

=== Drama ===
The school puts on three full-scale productions a year, and organises masterclasses and workshops with professional practitioners. In 2007, a Queen Anne's student featured in the St Trinians film.

=== Debating and public speaking ===
Queen Anne's School was a founder of the World Individual Debating and Public Speaking Championships and its students participate in the competition every year. It has also hosted the event on a number of occasions, most recently in 2003.

== Academic performance ==
The 2011 Ofsted Social Care report rated the school as 'outstanding', which Ofsted translates as "The main inspection finding is that this is an outstanding boarding school. The outcomes for boarders as described in the Every Child Matters document and underpinned by the nationally agreed standards are excellent. The school has an exceptionally high commitment towards enabling girls to fulfil their potential."

The Independent Schools Inspectorate's Inspection Report 2011 said: "The pupils’ overall achievement is excellent. The school meets highly successfully its aim to enable pupils to go onto higher education, and develop their talents fully." and "The quality of the pupils’ personal development is excellent, ensuring that the school’s aim to enable them to become confident, well-balanced individuals is met with resounding success."

== Notable former pupils ==
- Lesley Abdela, human rights campaigner
- Jean Banister, physiologist
- Barbara Brooke, Baroness Brooke of Ystradfellte, politician
- Olivia Carnegie-Brown, Olympic rower
- Christine Chaundler, children's author
- Janet Chisholm, MI6 agent during the Cold War
- Helena Cobban, writer and researcher on international relations
- Valerie Eliot, wife of poet T. S. Eliot
- Cara Gascoigne, physical educator, coach
- Fiona Hodgson, Baroness Hodgson of Abinger, politician
- Joan Jackson (Joan Hunter Dunn), muse of Sir John Betjeman
- Joanna Kennedy, civil engineer
- Elizabeth Jane Lloyd, artist
- Katharine Lloyd-Williams, anaesthetist
- Brenda Rawnsley, arts activist
- Jenny Seagrove, actress
- Posy Simmonds, cartoonist, writer and illustrator
- Hannah Steinberg, pioneer of experimental psychopharmacology
- Tamara Taylor, captain of England women's Rugby 2015 Six Nations team
- Nell Truman, tennis player, French Open doubles finalist
- Faith Wainwright, President of the Institution of Structural Engineers
- Lizbeth Webb, soprano and stage actress
- Margaret Webster, theater actress and director
