= Jean Hunter Cowan =

British artist (1882–1967)

- Born: Jean Hore; 1882; Edinburgh, Scotland
- Died: 1967 (aged 84–85)
- Education: Karlsruhe Conservatorium, Germany
- Known for: Painting

Jean Mildred Hunter Cowan née Hore, (1882–1967) was a Scottish artist who painted in oils and watercolours and was a portrait sculptor. She was also a keen sportswomen, a gifted amateur violinist and an early aviator.

== Biography ==
Cowan was born in Edinburgh and educated at St Leonards School in St Andrews and at the Karlsruhe Conservatorium in Germany. During World War I she served with an ambulance organisation in France, during which time she completed numerous sketches of the unit's work and of her co-workers. Returning to Edinburgh she exhibited regularly with the Scottish Society of Women Artists and, later in life, served as the Society's president throughout the 1950s. Cowan became a member of the Society of Scottish Artists in 1945 and also exhibited with the Royal Scottish Academy and the Royal Scottish Watercolour Society. She exhibited both bronze sculptures and watercolour paintings with the Royal Glasgow Institute of the Fine Arts.

Cowan travelled extensively throughout her life, especially in Africa and south-east Asia, and pursued several interests other than her art. In 1924 she won both the ladies golf championship of India and the ladies tennis doubles championship of Malaysia. She was a talented amateur violinist and in 1927 was the founding president of the Women's Section of the Edinburgh Society of Musicians. In 1911 Cowan learned to fly and at various times was claimed as either the first British, or the first Scottish, female solo pilot, with both these claims being strongly disputed by the Royal Aeronautical Society.
