= Adele Patrick =

Scottish artist

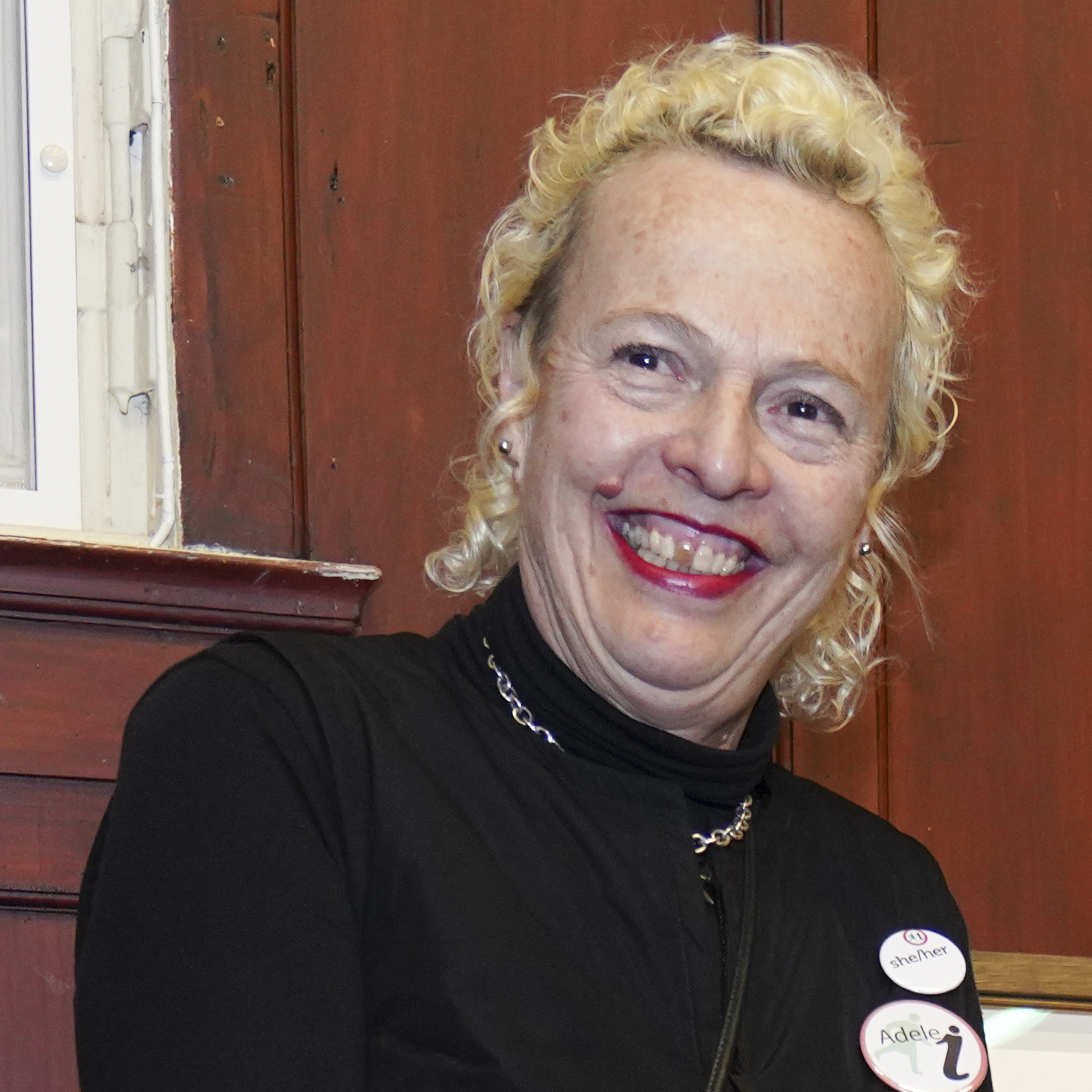
Adele Patrick in 2023

Adele Patrick is an artist, feminist and the co-founder of the Glasgow Women's Library. In 2011, she became a Fellow of the Royal Society of Arts and in 2015, she was awarded Scotswoman of the Year.

== Biography ==
Patrick studied Embroidered and Woven Textiles at the Glasgow School of Art in the mid-1980s, and after graduation she supervised the Gender Art and Culture Studies at the School for twelve years. This lead her to study for a PhD at the University of Strathclyde (completed at the University of Stirling in 2004). Her thesis looked at the convergence of gender, feminism, class and ethnicity in the territory of self-fashioning.

As well as founding the Glasgow Women's Library, she also co-founded the cultural organisation Women in Profile several years earlier in 1987. This specifically looked at how Glasgow could be re-branded away from a ‘masculinised’ culture to be more inclusive in time for Glasgow's status and European City of Culture in 1990.

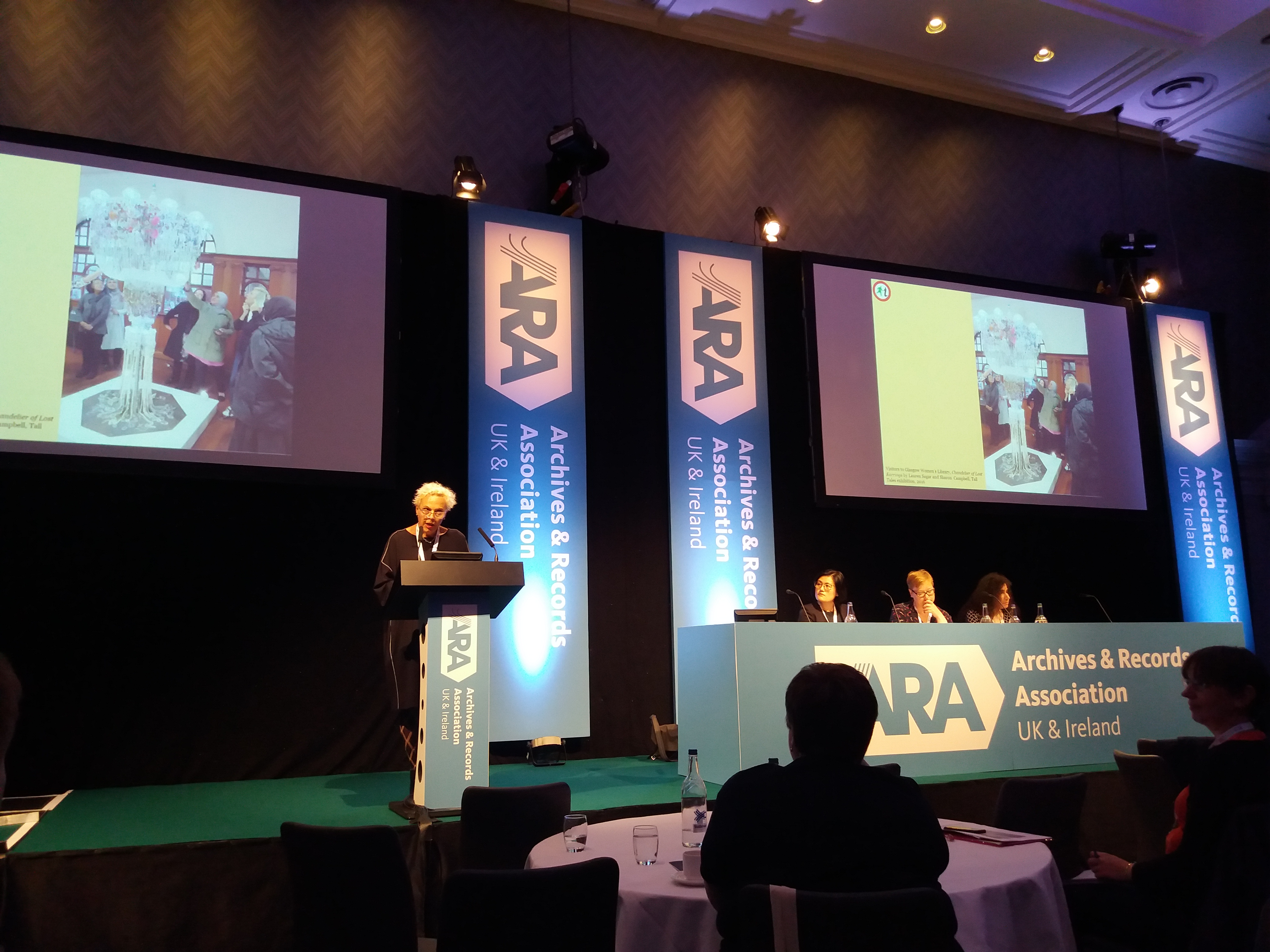
Adele Patrick speaking at Feminism in Archives, ARA2018.

She became a Fellow of the Royal Society of Arts in 2011. In 2015, she was awarded Scotswoman of the Year by the Evening Times in recognition of her work support and preserving the culture and history of women in Scotland and the UK. In 2017, Patrick was awarded an Honorary Doctorate (DLitt) by Glasgow School of Art / Glasgow University, and the University of Strathclyde. She was elected a Fellow of the Royal Society of Edinburgh in 2022.

== Involvement in Glasgow Women’s Library ==
Adele Patrick founded the Glasgow Women's Library in 1991, a lending library and repository of many types of historical and contemporary artefacts including Suffragette memorabilia and dress making patterns from the 1930s. The library is home to more than 20,000 books and 30,000 archival items as well as holding events throughout the year.

Patrick is now the library's Lifelong Learning and Creative Development Manager.

The library has links with several sister organisations across the world, a list to which is online.

== Personal ethos ==
Patrick has stated in interviews her aims are “to encourage women to dream more, have faith in their own abilities and aim higher.”

“It seems to me the aspirations for women are often very meagre,” she says. “After all, the film-makers of the future, the women who are going to be our next political leaders, have got to come from somewhere. Why shouldn’t it be the woman who has just walked through the door?”
