= Rosabelle Sinclair =

Personal information
- Born: 1890 Russian Empire
- Died: 1981 (aged 90–91)

Sport
- School team: St Leonards School

Rosabelle Sinclair (1890 – 1981), known as the affectionately as the "Grand Dame of Lacrosse", established the first women's lacrosse team in the United States. She was the first woman to be inducted into the National Lacrosse Hall of Fame.

== Early life ==
Sinclair was born in the Russian Empire in 1890 and educated in Philadelphia, before attending St Leonards School in St Andrews, where women's lacrosse had been introduced by Louisa Lumsden. Lumsden brought the game to Scotland in 1890 after watching a men's lacrosse game between the Canghuwaya Indians and the Montreal Lacrosse Club.

After leaving St Leonards School in 1910, Sinclair attended Madame Bergman Österberg's College of Physical Training in Dartford, England, where she was a classmate of fellow lacrosse coach Cara Gascoigne. She then taught at an all-girls school in Yorkshire and in 1919 accepted a post at Chelsea Physical Training College. In 1922 she left for the United States.

== Lacrosse ==
Sinclair arrived in the United States and taught gymnastics and games at Rosemary Hall School before becoming a physical education teacher at the Bryn Mawr School in Baltimore, Maryland. She introduced lacrosse to the all-girls school in 1926. She would continue teaching there and serve as Athletic Director from 1925 to 1951. Women's lacrosse differs greatly from the men's version, and with emphasis on stick skills and proficiency. Sinclair believed the game should be played with feminine refinement, stating:

"Lacrosse, as girls play it, is an orderly pastime that has little in common with the men's tribal warfare version except the long-handled racket or crosse that gives the sport its name, Its true that the object in both the men's and women's lacrosse is to send a ball through a goal by means of the racket, but whereas men resort to brute strength the women depend solely on skill."

— Rosabelle Sinclair

Sinclair's legacy remains as being responsible for the growth of women's lacrosse in the United States. In 1931, she helped form the United States Women's Lacrosse Association, which later was consolidated into US Lacrosse. Even after her retirement from the Bryn Mawr School, she remained involved in the development of women's lacrosse. In 1978, the Bryn Mawr School renamed their athletic fields in honor of Sinclair shortly before her death in 1981.
