= William Bentinck-Smith =

- Born: January 22, 1914; Boston, Massachusetts
- Died: January 19, 1993 (aged 78); Ayer, Massachusetts
- Occupation: Academic administrator

Academic background
- Education: Columbia University Graduate School of Journalism

William Bentinck-Smith (1914–1993) was a Harvard University administrator and for many years editor of the Harvard Alumni Bulletin, known for his "encyclopedic" knowledge of Harvard's history.

He was born in Boston and graduated from Harvard College in 1937. In World War II he served in the Navy, ending his service as a lieutenant commander. He wrote several books on Harvard College and its history, and especially its faculty and library system. At the time of his death he had completed two of three volumes of a history of Harvard's hundreds of endowed professorships.

== See also ==
- Mary Bentinck Smith, paternal aunt
