= Digital reference =

Library reference method

Digital reference (more commonly called virtual reference) is a service by which a library reference service is conducted online, and the reference transaction is a computer-mediated communication. It is the remote, computer-mediated delivery of reference information provided by library professionals to users who cannot access or do not want face-to-face communication. Virtual reference service is most often an extension of a library's existing reference service program. The word "reference" in this context refers to the task of providing assistance to library users in finding information, answering questions, and otherwise fulfilling users’ information needs. Reference work often but not always involves using reference works, such as dictionaries, encyclopedias, etc. This form of reference work expands reference services from the physical reference desk to a "virtual" reference desk where the patron could be writing from home, work or a variety of other locations.

The terminology surrounding virtual reference services may involve multiple terms used for the same definition. The preferred term for remotely delivered, computer-mediated reference services is "virtual reference", with the secondary non-preferred term "digital reference" having gone out of use. "Chat reference" is often used interchangeably with virtual reference, although it represents only one aspect of virtual reference. Virtual reference includes the use of both synchronous (i.e., IM, videoconferencing) and asynchronous communication (i.e., texting and email). Here, "synchronous virtual reference" refers to any real-time computer-mediated communication between patron and information professional. Asynchronous virtual reference is all computer-mediated communication that is sent and received at different times.

== History ==
The earliest digital reference services were launched in the mid-1980s, primarily by academic and medical libraries, and provided by e-mail. These early-adopter libraries launched digital reference services for two main reasons: to extend the hours that questions could be submitted to the reference desk, and to explore the potential of campus-wide networks, which at that time was a new technology.

With the advent of the graphical World Wide Web, libraries quickly adopted webforms for question submission. Since then, the percentage of questions submitted to services via webforms has outstripped the percentage submitted via email.

In the early- to mid-1990s, digital reference services began to appear that were not affiliated with any library. These digital reference services are often referred to as "AskA" services. An example of an AskA services is at the Internet Public Library.

Providing remote-based services for patrons has been a steady practice of libraries over the years. For example, before the widespread use of chat software, reference questions were often answered via phone, fax, email and audio conferencing. Email is the oldest type of virtual reference service used by libraries. Library services in America and the UK are just now gaining visibility in their use of virtual reference services using chat software. However, a survey in America revealed that by 2001 over 200 libraries were using chat reference services. The rapid global proliferation of information technology (IT) often leaves libraries at a disadvantage in terms of keeping their services current. However, libraries are always striving to understand their user demographics in order to provide the best possible services. Therefore, libraries continue to take notes from current cyber-culture and are continually incorporating a diversified range of interactive technologies in their service repertoires. Virtual reference represents only one small part of a larger library mission to meet the needs of a new generation, sometimes referred to as the "Google Generation", of users who have grown up with the internet. For instance, virtual reference may be used in conjunction with embedded Web 2.0 (online social media such as Facebook, YouTube, blogs, del.icio.us, Flickr, etc.) applications in a library's suite of online services. As technological innovations continue, libraries will be watching to find new, more personalized ways of interacting with remote reference users.

The range of cost-per-transaction of reference interactions has been found to be large, due to the differences in librarian salaries and infrastructural costs required by reference interviews.

== Forms of digital reference ==
=== Webforms ===
Webforms are created for digital reference services in order to help the patron be more productive in asking their question. This document helps the librarian locate exactly what the patron is asking for. Creation of webforms requires design consideration. Because webforms substitute for the reference interview, receiving as much information as possible from the patron is a key function.

Aspects commonly found within webforms:

- A return email address to send the answer to the question
- The question being asked
- The type of question
- What sources have been consulted by the patron
- How the patron is planning to use the information
- Location of the patron (are they a library patron?)
- A name to personalize the interaction
- A date by which the information is needed
- The type of sources being requested (print or electronic)

=== Chat using commercial applications ===
Several applications exist for providing chat-based reference. Examples include QuestionPoint inside the library field and Tutor.com outside the library field. These applications bear a resemblance to commercial help desk software. These applications possess functionality such as: chat, co-browsing of webpages, webpage and document pushing, customization of pre-scripted messages, storage of chat transcripts, and statistical reporting.

=== Chat using instant messaging ===
Instant messaging (IM) services are used by some libraries as a low-cost means of offering chat-based reference, since most IM services are free. Utilizing IM for reference services allows a patron to contact the library from any location via the internet. This service is like the traditional reference interview because it is a live interaction between the patron and the librarian. On the other side the reference interview is different because the conversation does not float away but instead is in print on the screen for the librarian to review if needed to better understand the patron. IM reference services may be for the use of in-house patrons as well as patrons unable to go to the library. If library computers support IM chat programs, patrons may IM from within the library to avoid losing their use of a computer or avoid making embarrassing questions public.

Successful IM reference services will:

- Create a profile to convey information about the library and increase online presence.
- Accept imperfection in conversations without spending time to go back and make corrections. Most words are recognizable through context.
- Become familiar with and use accepted IM abbreviations such as LOL (Laugh Out Loud).

At times, IM becomes challenging because of lack of non-verbal cues such as eye contact, and the perceived time pressure. Moreover, formulating the question online without the give and take of nonverbal cues and face to face conversation presents an added obstacle. In addition, to provide effective reference service through IM, it is important to meet higher level of information literacy standards. These standards include evaluating the information and its source, synthesizing the information to create new ideas or products, and understanding the societal, legal, and economic issues surrounding its use.

== Software for providing digital reference ==
Virtual service software programs offered by libraries are often unique, and tailored to the individual library's needs. However, each program may have several distinct features. A knowledge base is a chunk of information that users can access independently. An example of this is a serialized listing of frequently asked questions (FAQ) that a user can read and use at his or her leisure.

Online chat, or instant messaging (IM) has become a very popular Web-based feature. Instant messaging is a real time conversation that utilizes typed text instead of language. Users may feel a sense of satisfaction with the use of this tool because of their personalized interaction with staff.

The use of electronic mail (email) in responding to reference questions in libraries has been in use for years. Also, in some cases with the IM feature, a question may be asked that cannot be resolved in online chat. In this instance the staff member may document the inquiring patron’s email address and will the user a response.

With the increase in use of text messaging (SMS), some libraries are also adopting text messaging in their virtual reference services. Librarians can use mobile phones, text-to-instant messaging or web-based services to respond to reference questions via text messaging.

Co-browsing, or cooperative browsing, is a virtual reference function that involves interactive control of a user’s web browser. This function enables the librarian to see what the patron has on his or her computer screen. Several types of co-browsing have been offered in mobile devices of late; libraries may have software that incorporates dual modes of co-browsing in a variety of formats. For instance, it is possible to browse on a mobile device within and between documents (such as Word), webpages, and images.

== In the UK ==
Virtual reference services are growing in popularity in the UK with more institutions accepting queries via email, instant messaging and other chat based services. A study of the use of virtual reference within UK academic institutions showed that 25% currently offer a form of virtual reference, with 54% of academic institutions surveyed considering adding this service.

UK public libraries were instrumental in some of the first steps towards UK-wide internet collaboration amongst libraries with the EARL Consortium (Electronic Access to Resources in Libraries) in 1995, in a time where internet access was a rare commodity for both library staff and the public. Resources were collated and lines of communication opened between libraries across the UK, paving the way for services all over the world to follow suit. There are now a number of area-specific reference services across the UK including Ask A Librarian (UK-wide, established in 1997), Ask Cymru (Welsh and English language service), Enquire (Government funded through the People's Network, also UK-wide), and Ask Scotland. Ask Scotland was created by the Scottish Government's advisory body on libraries, SLIC (Scottish Library and Information Council), using QuestionPoint and funded by the Public Library Quality Improvement Fund (PLQIF) in June 2009.

== American Library Association's digital reference guidelines ==
The definition formulated by the American Library Association's (ALA) 2004 MARS Digital Reference Guidelines Ad Hoc Committee contains three components:

1. "Virtual reference is reference service initiated electronically, often in real-time, where patrons employ computers or other Internet technology to communicate with reference staff, without being physically present. Communication channels used frequently in virtual reference include chat, videoconferencing, Voice over IP, co-browsing, e-mail, and instant messaging.
2. While online sources are often utilized in provision of virtual reference, use of electronic sources in seeking answers is not of itself virtual reference.
3. Virtual reference queries are sometimes followed-up with telephone, fax, in-person and regular mail interactions, even though these modes of communication are not considered virtual."

In January 2011 QuestionPoint and the ALA were in talks about offering a National Ask A Librarian service across the whole United States.

== Other countries ==
In Europe some countries offer services in both their own national language and in English. European countries include: Finland, the Netherlands (in Dutch only), Denmark, and France.

Other countries which offer virtual reference services include: Australia, New Zealand, Canada, and the state of Colorado in the United States.

== Chasing the Sun ==
A collaboration between UK and Australian library services, entitled Chasing the Sun, was initiated using QuestionPoint software to provide an all-hours digital reference chat service. Targeted at health libraries where reference queries from health professionals could occur at any time of the day or night due to medical emergencies, the collaboration between the two countries meant that someone would be on hand to field the query at any time.

== See also ==
- Ask a Librarian
- Reference library
