= Louisa Lumsden =

Scottish-born educationalist and Cambridge tutor 1840–1935

Dame Louisa Lumsden DBE
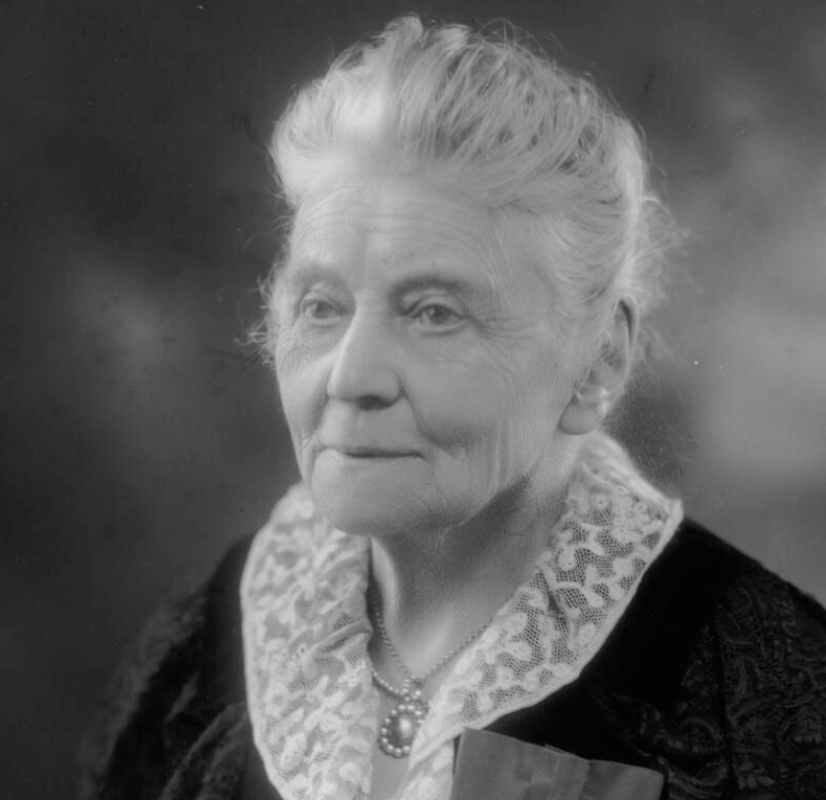
- on 4 July 1925 by Bassano Ltd
- Born: Louisa Innes Lumsden; 31 December 1840; Aberdeen, Scotland
- Died: 2 January 1935 (aged 94); Edinburgh, Scotland
- Education: Girton College, Cambridge
- Occupation: Headmistress St Leonards School (1877–82)
- Known for: Girton pioneer; Campaigner for equality for women in education
- Partner: Constance Maynard
- Awards: Honorary LL.D (St.A.)

Dame Louisa Innes Lumsden DBE (31 December 1840 – 2 January 1935) was a Scottish pioneer of female education. Lumsden was one of the first five students Hitchin College, later Girton College, Cambridge in 1869 and one of the first three women to pass the Tripos exam in 1873. She returned as the first female resident and tutor to Girton in 1873.

From 1877-82, Lumsden became the first Headmistress of St Leonards School, Fife, and first warden of University Hall, University of St Andrews which opened in 1896. She is credited with introducing lacrosse to St Leonards.

In 1908, Lumsden was asked to become the President of the Aberdeen branch of the National Union of Women's Suffrage Societies (NUWSS). When Scottish suffrage organisations organised the planting of The Suffrage Oak to mark some women getting the vote in 1918, Lumsden at age 78 was given the 'honour' of planting the tree.

== Early life ==
Louisa was third daughter and youngest of seven children of Clements Lumsden, Aberdeen advocate and Writer to the Signet, and Jane, née Forbes. After her father's death in 1853, when she was 12, Louisa's mother moved temporarily to Cheltenham and Louisa attended a private school there, then becoming a boarder at the Château de Koekelberg, Brussels, which she left in 1856 for a smaller school in London. She returned to live with her family in Glenbogie, Aberdeenshire in 1857.

== University education ==
Lumsden attended classes of the Edinburgh Ladies Education Association from 1868 to 1869, with lectures by University of Edinburgh professors, though women students were still not awarded full degrees.

A college for women was established by Emily Davies in 1869 in Hitchin, 27 miles from Cambridge, as the first for women students studying for the Cambridge Tripos examinations on equal terms with men. As Girton College it moved to new buildings on its present site in 1873.

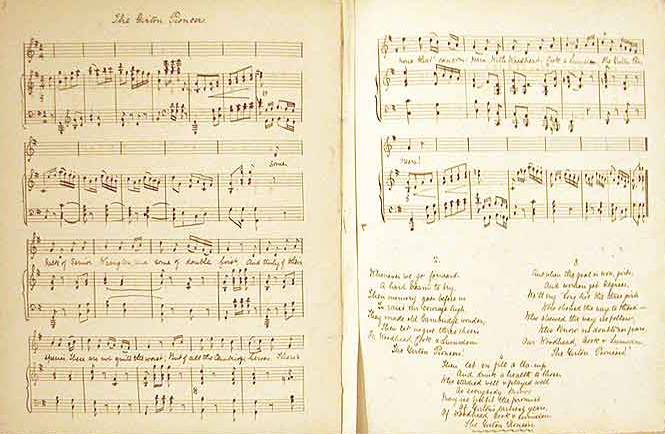
Girton Pioneers college song commemorating the first three women to gain the Cambridge Tripos

Louisa Lumsden was one of the first five students to be taught at Hitchin and one of the first three female students to sit unofficial University of Cambridge Tripos examinations in Lent term 1873, the others being Rachel Cook and Sarah Woodhead. The three were commemorated in song as the Girton Pioneers.

Louisa Lumsden is recorded as a student at Girton from 1869 to 1872, a tutor from 1873 to 1874 and recipient of the Classical Tripos in 1892. She resigned her post as tutor after conflicts with Emily Davies over neglect of student welfare.

== St Leonards School ==
The girls school founded in St Andrews, Fife, in 1877 had Louisa Lumsden for its first headmistress (1877–1882). St Leonards was the first school for young women in Scotland modelled on an English public school; the curriculum included classics, mathematics and sports. Before this Lumsden had taught classics at Cheltenham Ladies College (1876–1877). Her partner, and friend from her Cambridge days, Constance Maynard, accompanied her from Cheltenham to St Andrews and helped to set up the school. Maynard left in 1880 to become the first principal of Westfield College (1882–1913). Lumsden resigned as head in January 1882, citing ill health. Frances Dove, who had also studied at Girton and taught at Cheltenham, replaced her.

== Lacrosse ==
Lumsden, in a letter home from the White Mountains in New Hampshire dated 6 September 1884, described how the Canghuwaya Indians played lacrosse against the Montreal Club in Montreal: "It is a wonderful game, beautiful and graceful. (I was so charmed with it that I introduced it at St Leonards.)" Rosabelle Sinclair, who established the first women's lacrosse team in the United States, having attended St Leonards from 1906 to 1910, established lacrosse for girls at the Bryn Mawr School in Baltimore, Maryland.

== University Hall ==
University Hall, the first residential hall for women students in Scotland, was founded at St Andrews University in 1896; Louisa Lumsden was appointed its first warden. The intention was to create a Scottish version of Girton, but it met some resistance from men and some of the female students it was intended for. Lumsden resigned her post in 1900.

== Women's emancipation ==
In 1908 Lumsden accepted an invitation to become president of the Aberdeen Suffrage Association. She was a non-militant suffragist and provided a caravan called "Curlew", used by campaigners to travel about the country. In 1913 she spoke at a rally in Hyde Park, London, on behalf of the Scottish branch of the National Union of Women's Suffrage Societies and later became one of the vice-presidents of the Scottish Churches' League for Woman Suffrage. Lumsden also spoke at the Aberdeen Association for Women's Suffrage on 19 February 1913, on 'Why should not Women be Citizens?' to the Oddfellows association. She was the one who planted The Suffrage Oak in Glasgow, which was chosen as tree of the year in 2015.

== Personal life ==
Lumsden was in a long-term relationship with fellow educational pioneer Constance Maynard, whom she had met at Girton College. They referred to each other as wife and husband.

== Recognition ==
Lumsden was awarded an honorary doctorate of laws (LL.D) by St Andrews University at its Quincentenary celebrations in 1911. Under a Girton College charter, Louisa Lumsden was made a life governor in 1924. She was made a Dame Commander of the Order of the British Empire (DBE) in the 1925 Birthday Honours.

At the University of St Andrews a wing of University Hall is named after Lumsden. The Lumsden Club is named in her honour; its members are current female students at the University of St Andrews and its objective is charitable fundraising.

There is a memorial plaque to Louisa Lumsden in Aberdeen to commemorate where she worked at 214 Union Street.

She is named as one of The Girton Pioneers in the song of that name written in 1873 by 'several students at Hitchin', set to the tune of The British Grenadiers. The pioneers referred to are Lumsden, Rachel Cook and Sarah Woodhead.

And when the goal is won, girls,

And women get degrees,

We'll cry, "Long live the three, girls,

Who showed the way to these!

Who showed the way we follow,

Who knew no doubts or fears,

Our Woodhead, Cook and Lumsden,

The Girton Pioneers."
