= University Hall (University of St Andrews) =

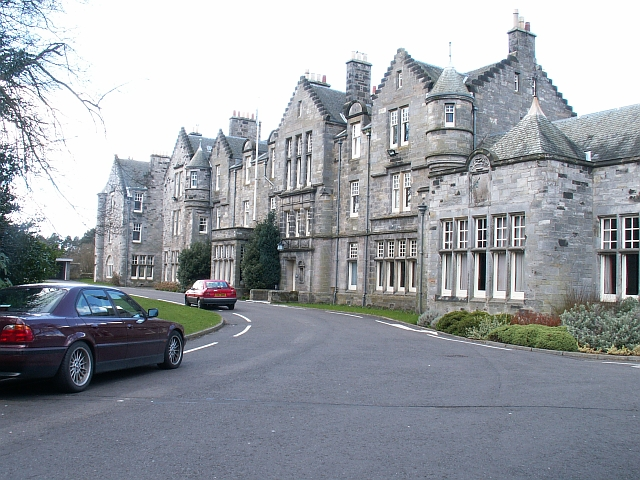
- University Hall as seen from Donaldson Gardens
- Interactive map of the University Hall area

General information
- Architectural style: Scottish Baronial
- Location: St Andrews, Fife, Scotland
- Coordinates: 56.3387°N 2.8086°W
- Completed: 1896
- Client: University of St Andrews

Website
- University Hall

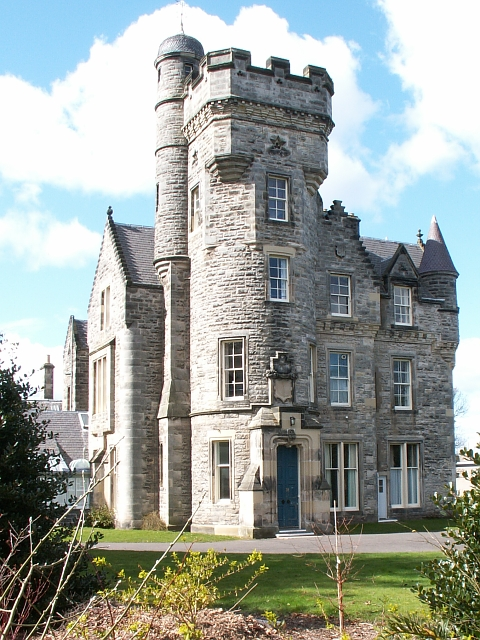
The Wardlaw wing of University Hall

University Hall is a student hall of residence at the University of St Andrews in St Andrews, Fife, Scotland. When it opened in 1896 it was the first residence for women students in Scotland. University Hall is now a mixed residence. Louisa Lumsden was the first warden of the new residence hall and remained in that position until 1900.

The Hall consists of three buildings: Wardlaw, a listed building acquired in 1947, which continues to be open to lady students only; Old Wing, the original hall; and the modern Lumsden Wing in 1962, which contains the central dining room. The amenities include libraries and an oak panelled common room.

University Hall underwent a major refurbishment, which was completed in 2009.

Whitehorn Hall was opened in 2018 within the grounds of University Hall and was named after journalist Katharine Whitehorn. The design and architecture firm HLM won the 2019 Scottish Design Award in the 'Architecture: Residential' category for the design of the new hall. The building also won 'Best Building' in the Educational category at the St Andrews Preservation Trust’s Pride of Place Awards in 2022.
