= Belgium men's national intercrosse team =

The Belgium men's national intercrosse team is the intercrosse team representing Belgium internationally, and a member of the Fédération Internationale d’Inter-Crosse (FIIC). The team also participated at the 1999 Intercrosse World Championship and 2000 Intercrosse World Championship.

== Tournament history ==
World Championships
Year	Championship	Host	Classification
1999	1st World Championship	Auderghem (Belgium)	4th place
2000	2nd World Championship	Kostelec (Czech Republic)	6th place

== See also ==
- Intercrosse
