= Canada men's national intercrosse team =

Medal record

World Championships
Gold medal – first place	2000 Czech Republic	Team
Gold medal – first place	2001 Italy	Team
Gold medal – first place	2003 Canada	Team
Silver medal – second place	1999 Belgium	Team
Silver medal – second place	2002 Hungary	Team
Silver medal – second place	2004 Switzerland	Team
Silver medal – second place	2008 Switzerland	Team
Silver medal – second place	2016 Switzerland	Team
Bronze medal – third place	2006 Hungary	Team
Bronze medal – third place	2013 France	Team

The Canada men's national intercrosse team is the intercrosse team representing Canada internationally, and a member of the Fédération Internationale d'Inter-Crosse (FIIC). Canada until 2003 operated under the name Quebec. The team has competed in the annual Intercrosse World Championship several times starting in 1999. Canada did not participate in the 2005 Intercrosse World Championship and 2012 Intercrosse World Championship.

== Tournament history ==
World Championships
Year	Championship	Host	Classification
1999	1st World Championship	Auderghem (Belgium)	2nd place
2000	2nd World Championship	Kostelec (Czech Republic)	Champions
2001	3rd World Championship	Lecco (Italy)	Champions
2002	4th World Championship	Szombathely (Hungary)	2nd place
2003	5th World Championship	Sherbrooke (Canada)	Champions
2004	6th World Championship	Sursee (Switzerland)	2nd place
2006	8th World Championship	Szombathely (Hungary)	3rd place
2008	9th World Championship	Kriens (Switzerland)	2nd place
2013	11th World Championship	Lons-le-Saunier (France)	3rd place
2016	12th World Championship	Montreal (Canada)	2nd place

== See also ==
- Intercrosse
