= Lacrosse =

Team sport

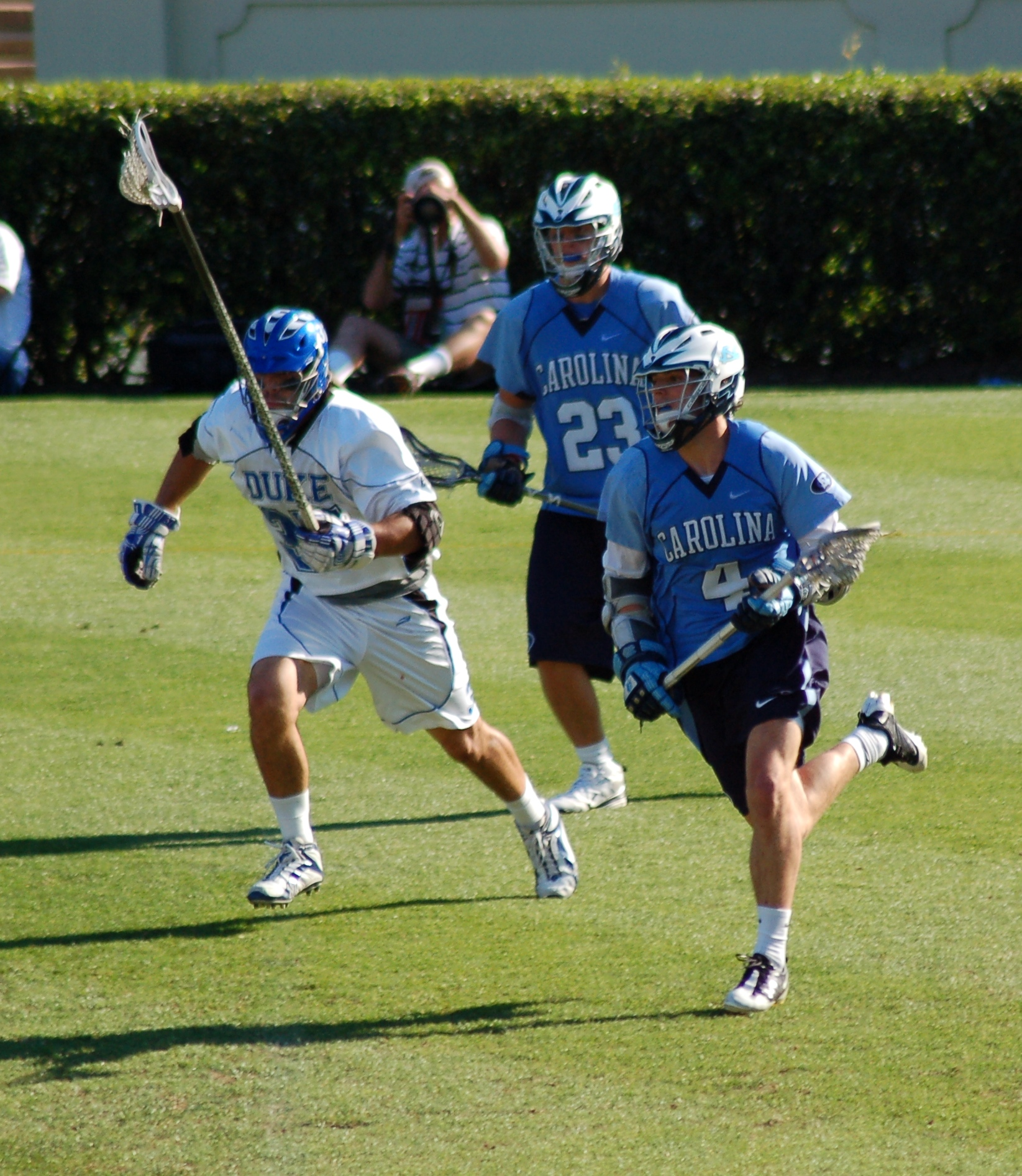
- Men's field lacrosse game between North Carolina and Duke in April 2009
- Highest governing body: World Lacrosse
- Nicknames: The Medicine Game; The Creator's Game
- First played: 12th century, modified by Europeans in the 17th century

Characteristics
- Contact: Yes
- Type: Team sport, stick sport, ball sport
- Equipment: Lacrosse stick and ball in addition to various body armor or pads. Different protective gear for different versions of the game
- Venue: Outdoor lacrosse field or indoor lacrosse rink

Presence
- Olympic: Men's field at the Summer Olympics in 1904 and 1908. Demonstrated in 1928, 1932 and 1948; Men's and women's sixes in 2028
- World Games: Women's field in 2017; Men's and women's sixes in 2022

Lacrosse is a contact team sport played with a lacrosse stick and a lacrosse ball. It is the oldest organized sport in North America, with its origins with the indigenous people of North America as early as the 12th century. The game was extensively modified by European colonists, reducing the violence, to create its current collegiate and professional form.

Players use the head of the lacrosse stick to carry, pass, catch, and shoot the ball into the goal. The sport has five versions that have different sticks, fields, rules and equipment: field lacrosse, women's lacrosse, box lacrosse, lacrosse sixes and intercrosse. The men's games, field lacrosse (outdoor) and box lacrosse (indoor), are contact sports and all players wear protective gear: helmet, gloves, shoulder pads, and elbow pads. The women's game is played outdoors and does not allow body contact but does allow stick to stick contact. The only protective gear required for women players is eyegear, while goalies wear helmets and protective pads. Lacrosse sixes is played by both men and women on a smaller field and is the most common version at multi-sport events. Intercrosse is a mixed-gender non-contact sport that uses an all-plastic stick and a softer ball.

The modern sport is governed by World Lacrosse and is the only international sport organization to recognize First Nations bands and Native American tribes as sovereign nations. The organization hosts the World Lacrosse Men's Championship, the World Lacrosse Women's Championship, the World Lacrosse Box Championships for box lacrosse, and the Under-19 World Lacrosse Championships for both men and women. Each is held every four years. Lacrosse at the Summer Olympics has been contested at two editions of the Summer Olympic Games, 1904 and 1908. It will be contested at the 2028 Olympic Games in the lacrosse sixes format. It was also held as a demonstration event at the 1928, 1932, and 1948 Summer Olympics.

== History ==
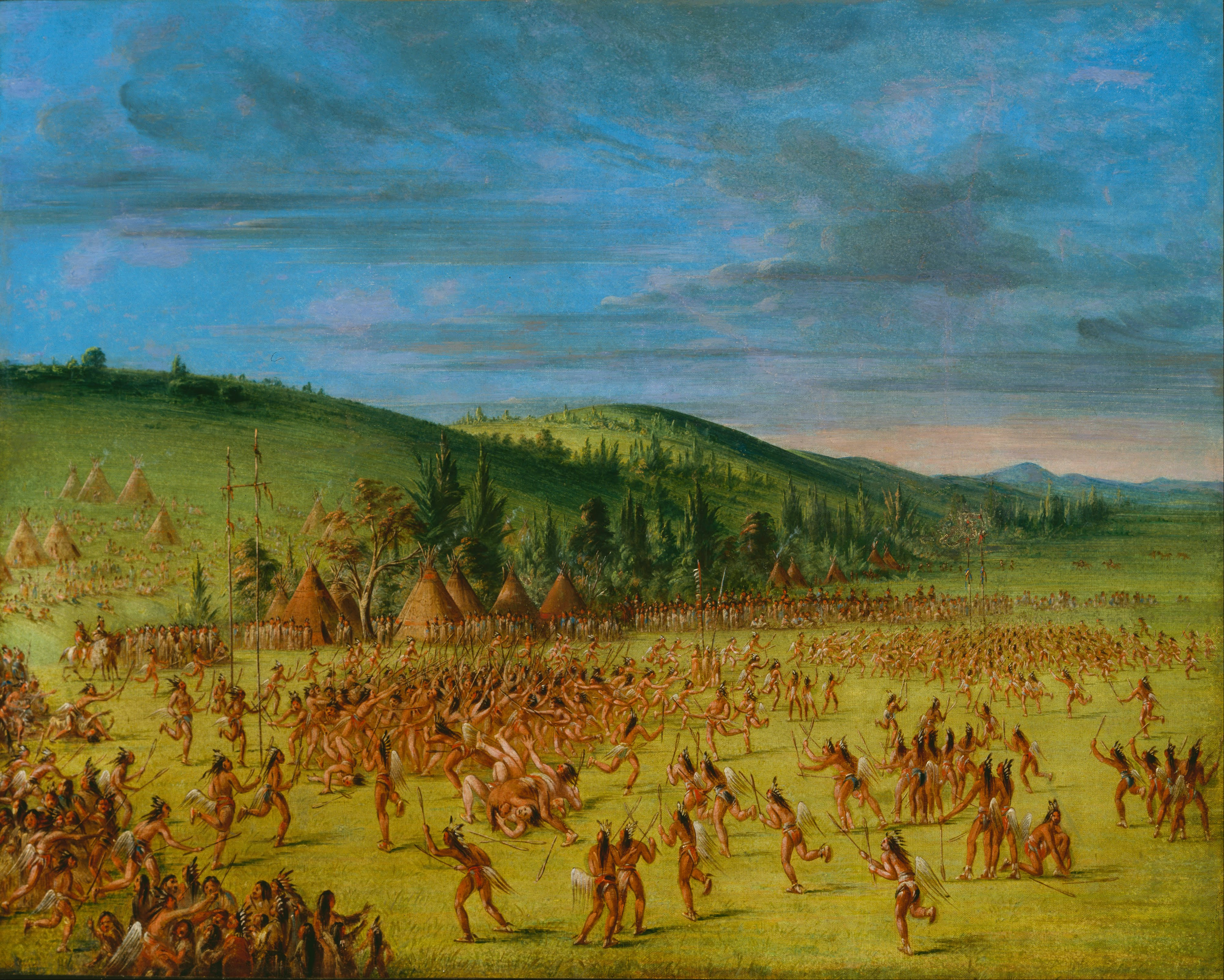
Ball-play of the Choctaw – ball up by George Catlin, c. 1846–1850

Lacrosse is based on games played by various Native American communities as early as 1100 AD. By the 17th century, a version of lacrosse was well-established and was documented by Jesuit missionary priests in the territory of present-day Canada.

In the traditional aboriginal Canadian version, each team consisted of about 100 to 1,000 men on a field several miles/kilometers long. These games lasted from sunup to sundown for two to three days straight and were played as part of ceremonial ritual, a kind of symbolic warfare, or to give thanks to the Creator or Master.

Lacrosse played a significant role in the community and religious life of tribes across the continent for many years. Early lacrosse was characterized by deep spiritual involvement, befitting the spirit of combat in which it was undertaken. Those who took part did so in the role of warriors, with the goal of bringing glory and honour to themselves and their tribes. The game was said to be played "for the Creator" or was referred to as "The Creator's Game", and a version of the game was called "baggataway".

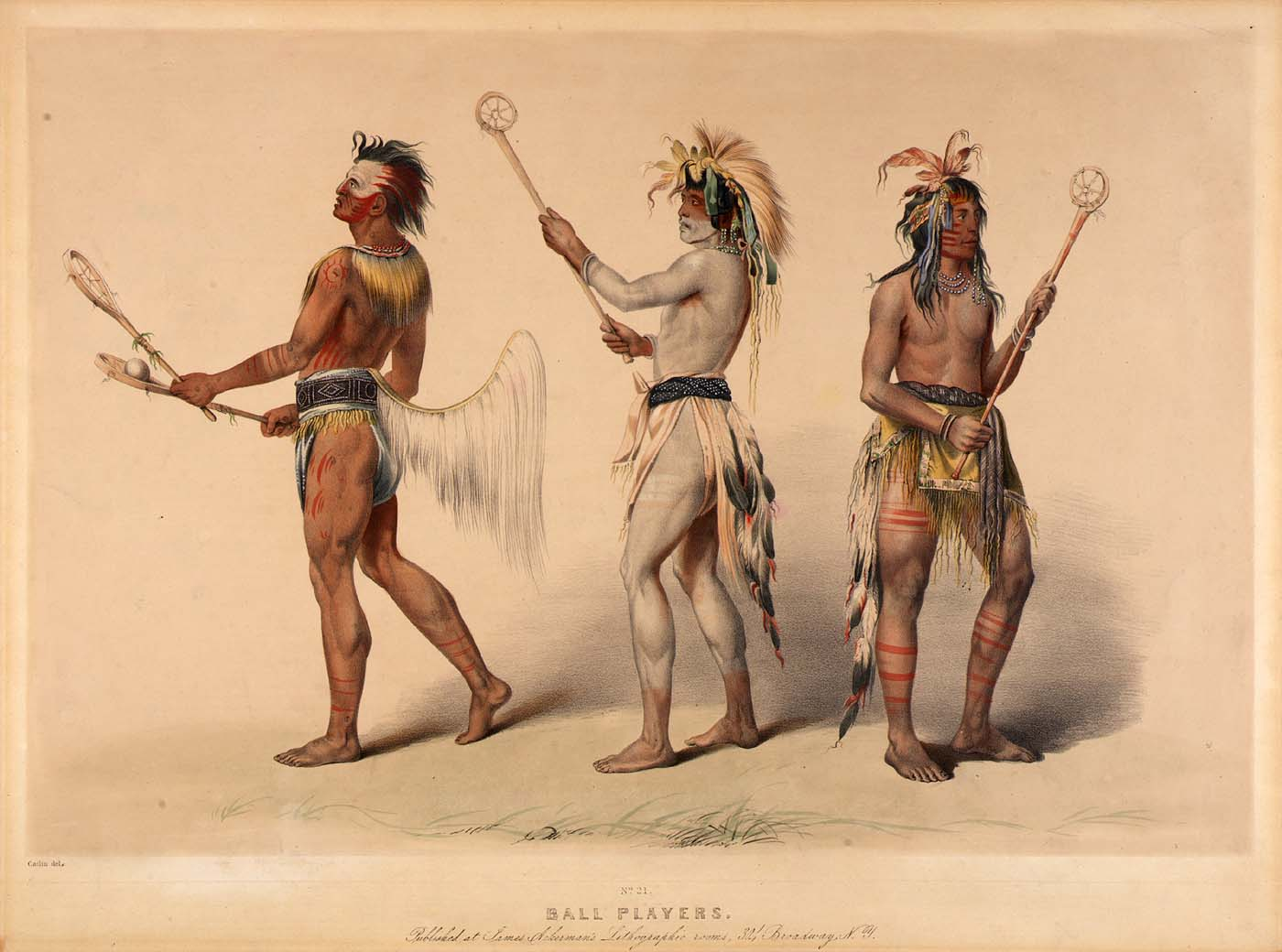
Ball Players by George Catlin

The French Jesuit missionary Jean de Brébeuf saw Wendat (Huron) tribesmen play the game during 1637 in present-day Ontario. He called it la crosse, "the stick" in French. The name seems to be originated from the French term for field hockey, le jeu de la crosse.

James Smith described in some detail a game being played in 1757 by Mohawk people "wherein now they used a wooden ball, about 3 inches (7.6 cm) in diameter, and the instrument they moved it with was a strong staff about 5 feet (1.5 m) long, with a hoop net on the end of it, large enough to contain the ball".

English-speaking people from Montreal noticed Mohawk people playing the game and started playing themselves in the 1830s. In 1856, William George Beers, a Canadian dentist, founded the Montreal Lacrosse Club. In 1860, Beers codified the game, shortening the length of each game and reducing the number of players to 12 per team. The first game played under Beers's rules was at Upper Canada College in 1867; they lost to the Toronto Cricket Club by a score of 3–1.

The new sport proved to be very popular and spread across the English-speaking world; by 1900 there were dozens of men's clubs in Canada, the United States, England, Australia, and New Zealand. The women's game was introduced by Louisa Lumsden in Scotland in 1890. The first women's club in the United States was started by Rosabelle Sinclair at Bryn Mawr School in 1926.

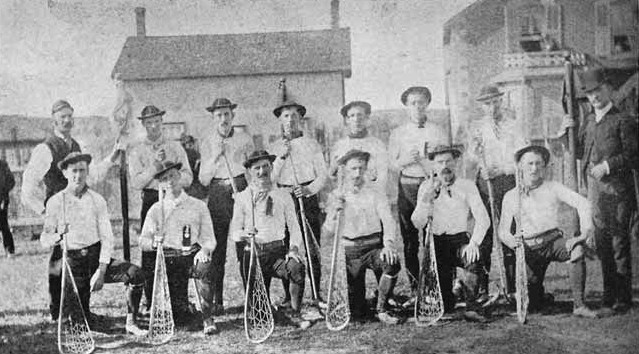
Richmond Hill "Young Canadians" lacrosse team, 1885

In the United States, lacrosse during the late 1800s and first half of the 1900s was primarily a regional sport centered around the Mid-Atlantic states, especially New York and Maryland. However, in the last half of the 20th century, the sport spread outside this region, and can be currently found in most of the United States. According to a survey conducted by US Lacrosse in 2016, there are over 825,000 lacrosse participants nationwide and lacrosse is the fastest-growing team sport among NFHS member schools.

== Versions of lacrosse ==
=== Field lacrosse ===
Diagram of a men's college lacrosse field

Field lacrosse is the men's outdoor version of the sport. There are ten players on each team: three attackmen, three midfielders, three defensemen, and one goalie. Each player carries a lacrosse stick. A short stick measures between 40 and 42 inches (100 and 110 cm) long and is used by attackmen and midfielders. A maximum of four players on the field per team may carry a long stick which is between 52 and 72 inches (130 and 180 cm) long and is used by the three defensemen and sometimes one defensive midfielder. The goalie uses a stick with a head as wide as 12 inches (30 cm) that can be between 40 and 72 inches (100 and 180 cm) long.

The field of play is 110 by 60 yards (101 by 55 m). The goals are 6 by 6 ft (1.8 by 1.8 m) and are 80 yd (73 m) apart. Each goal sits inside a circular "crease", measuring 18 ft (5.5 m) in diameter. The goalie has special privileges within the crease to avoid opponents' stick checks. Offensive players or their sticks may not enter into the crease at any time. The mid-field line separates the field into an offensive and defensive zone for each team. Each team must keep four players in its defensive zone and three players in its offensive zone at all times. It does not matter which positional players satisfy the requirement, although usually the three attackmen stay in the offensive zone, the three defensemen and the goalie stay in the defensive zone, and the three middies play in both zones. A team that violates this rule is offsides and either loses possession of the ball if they have it or incurs a technical foul if they do not.

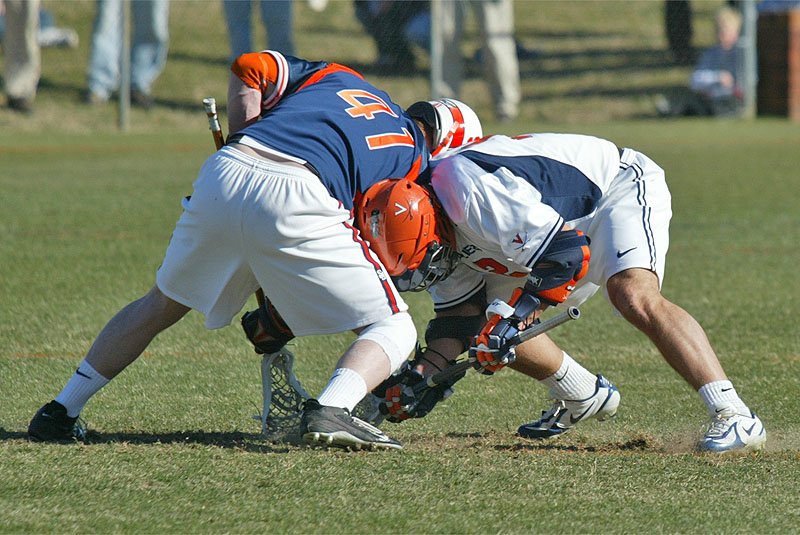
A face-off

The regulation playing time of a game is 60 minutes, divided into four periods of 15 minutes each. Play is started at the beginning of each quarter and after each goal with a face-off. During a face-off, two players lay their sticks on the ground parallel to the mid-line, the two heads of their sticks on opposite sides of the ball. At the whistle, the face-off-men scrap for the ball, often by "clamping" it under their stick and flicking it out to their teammates. When one of the teams has possession of the ball, they bring it into their offensive zone and try to score a goal. Due to the offsides rule, settled play involves six offensive players versus six defensive players and a goalie.

If the ball goes out of bounds, possession is awarded against the team that touched it last. The exception is when the ball is shot towards the goal. Missed shots that go out of bounds are awarded to the team that has the player who is the closest to the ball when and where the ball goes out. During play, teams may substitute players in and out if they leave and enter the field through the substitution area, sometimes referred to as "on the fly". After penalties and goals, players may freely substitute and do not have to go through the substitution area.

Penalties are awarded for rule violations and result in the offending team losing possession (loss of possession) or temporarily losing a player (time serving). During time serving penalties, the penalized team plays with one fewer player for the duration of the penalty. Time serving penalties are either releasable or non-releasable. When serving a releasable penalty, the offending player may re-enter play if a goal is scored by the opposing team during the duration of the penalty. Non-releasable penalties do not allow this and the player must serve the entire duration. In conjunction with the offsides rule, the opponent may play with six attackers versus the penalized team's five defenders and goalie. The team that has taken the penalty is said to be playing man down, while the other team is man up. Teams will use various lacrosse strategies to attack and defend while a player is being penalized.

There are two classes of rule violations that result in penalties: technical fouls and personal fouls. Technical fouls, such as offsides, pushing, and holding, result in either a loss of possession or a 30-second penalty, depending on which team has the ball. Personal fouls, such as cross-checking, illegal body checking, or slashing, concern actions that endanger player safety. Cross-checking is when a player strikes another player with the shaft of the stick between his hands. A slash is when a player strikes another player with the end of the stick anywhere besides the gloves. These fouls draw 1-minute or longer penalties; the offending player must leave the field.

=== Box lacrosse ===
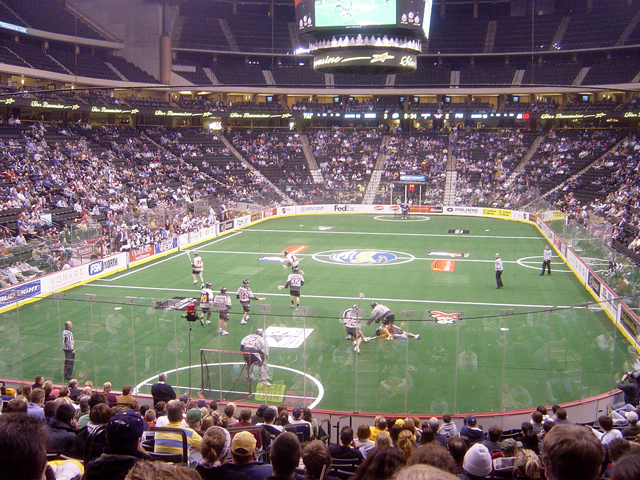
A game of box lacrosse in the NLL

Box lacrosse is played by teams of five runners plus a goalie on an ice hockey rink where the ice has been removed or covered by artificial turf, or in an indoor soccer field. The enclosed playing area is called a box, in contrast to the open playing field of the traditional game. This version of the game was introduced in Canada in the 1930s to promote business for hockey arenas outside of the ice hockey season. Within several years it had nearly supplanted field lacrosse in Canada.

The goals in box lacrosse are smaller than field lacrosse, traditionally 4 ft (1.2 m) wide and tall. Also, the goaltender wears much more protective padding, including a massive chest protector and armguard combination known as "uppers", large shin guards known as leg pads (both of which must follow strict measurement guidelines), and ice hockey-style goalie masks.

The style of the game is quick, accelerated by the close confines of the floor and a shot clock. The shot clock requires the attacking team to take a shot on goal within 30 seconds of gaining possession of the ball. Box lacrosse is also a much more physical game. Since cross checking is legal in box lacrosse, players wear rib pads and the shoulder and elbow pads are bigger and stronger than what field lacrosse players wear. Box lacrosse players wear a hockey helmet with a box lacrosse cage. There is no offsides in box lacrosse, the players substitute freely from their bench areas as in hockey. However, most players specialize in offense or defense, so usually all five runners substitute for teammates as their team transitions between offense and defense.

For penalties, the offending player is sent to the penalty box and his team has to play without him, or man-down, for the length of the penalty. Most fouls are minor penalties and last for two minutes, major penalties for serious offenses last five minutes. What separates box lacrosse (and ice hockey) from other sports is that at the top levels of professional and junior lacrosse, participating in a fight does not automatically cause an ejection, but a five-minute major penalty is given.

Box lacrosse is played at the highest level in the National Lacrosse League and by the Senior A divisions of the Canadian Lacrosse Association. The National Lacrosse League (NLL) employs some minor rule changes from the Canadian Lacrosse Association (CLA) rules. Notably, the goals are 4 feet 9 inches (1.45 m) wide instead of 4 feet (1.2 m) and the games are played during the winter. The NLL games consist of four fifteen-minute quarters compared with three periods of twenty minutes each in CLA games. NLL players may only use sticks with hollow shafts, while CLA permits solid wooden sticks.

=== Women's lacrosse ===
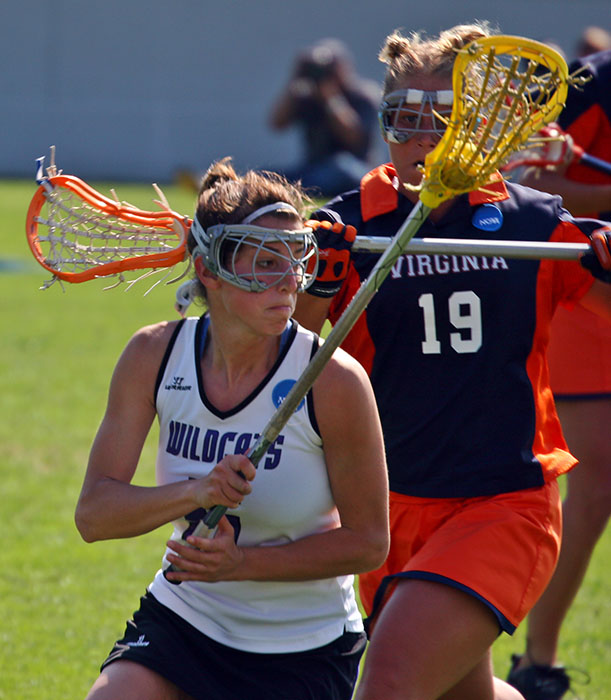
2005 NCAA Division I Women's Lacrosse Championship

The rules of women's lacrosse differ significantly from men's lacrosse, most notably by equipment and the degree of allowable physical contact. Women's lacrosse rules also differ significantly between the US and all other countries, who play by the Federation of International Lacrosse (FIL) rules. Women's lacrosse does not allow physical contact; the only protective equipment worn is a mouth guard and eye guard. In the early part of the 21st century, there were discussions of requiring headgear to prevent concussions. In 2008, Florida was the first state to mandate headgear in women's lacrosse.

Stick checking is permitted in the women's game, but only in certain levels of play and within strict rules. Women's lacrosse also does not allow players to have a pocket, or loose net, on the lacrosse stick. Women start the game with a "draw" instead of a face-off. The two players stand up and the ball is placed between their stick heads while their sticks are horizontal at waist-height. At the whistle, the players lift their sticks into the air, trying to control where the ball goes.

The first modern women's lacrosse game was held at St Leonards School in Scotland in 1890. It was introduced by the school's headmistress Louisa Lumsden after a visit to Quebec, where she saw it played. The first women's lacrosse team in the United States was established at Bryn Mawr School in Baltimore, Maryland in 1926.

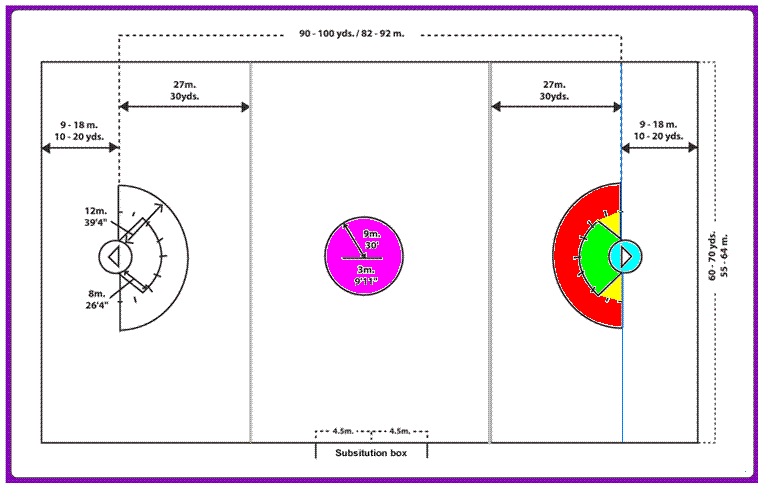
Women's lacrosse field diagram

Both the number of players and the lines on the field differ from men's lacrosse. There are 12 players in women's lacrosse and players must abide by certain boundaries that do not exist in men's play. The three specific boundaries are the 8-meter (26 ft 3 in) "fan" in front of the goal (11 m [36 ft 1 in] internationally), the 12-meter (39 ft 4 in) (8 m [26 ft 3 in] internationally) half circle that surrounds the 8-meter fan, and the draw circle in the center of the field, which is used for draws to start quarters and after goals. The goal circle is also positioned slightly closer to the end line in women's lacrosse compared to men's. In women's lacrosse on either the offensive or defensive end, the players besides the goaltender are not able to step inside the goal circle; this becomes a "goal-circle violation". However, at the women's collegiate level, defenders may pass through the goal circle.

The 8-meter fan that is in front of the goal circle has a few restrictions in it. Defenders cannot stand inside the 8-meter fan longer than 3 seconds without being a stick-length away from the offensive player they are guarding. This is very similar to the three-second rule in basketball. A three seconds violation results in a player from the other team taking a free shot against the goalie. If you are an attacker trying to shoot the ball into the goal, you are not supposed to take a shot while a defender is in "shooting space". To make sure that you, the defender, are being safe, you want to lead with your lacrosse stick and once you are a sticks-length away, you can be in front of her.

=== Lacrosse sixes ===
Lacrosse sixes is a variant of lacrosse played outdoors with six players on each side. The game follows similar rules to traditional field lacrosse, with modifications and a shorter game time. It was created in 2021 by World Lacrosse in a bid to achieve lacrosse's participation in the Olympic Games, and will make its Olympic debut at the 2028 edition in Los Angeles.

Lacrosse sixes has similar rules for men and women but preserves some differences, such as the amount of contact allowed. The major rule differences as compared to traditional field lacrosse are as follows:

- The field of play is smaller, at 70 meters by 36 meters.
- Face-offs only occur at the beginning of each quarter. Play is restarted after goals by the goalie taking the ball out of the net.
- A 30-second shot clock is added.
- Games are played in 4, 8-minute quarters.
- Rosters consist of 12 players.
- Everyone plays both offense and defense.
- There are no long crosses.

=== Intercrosse ===
Intercrosse, or soft stick lacrosse, is a non-contact form of lacrosse with a standardized set of rules using modified lacrosse equipment. An intercrosse stick is different from a normal lacrosse stick, the head is made completely of plastic instead of leather or nylon pockets in traditional lacrosse sticks. The ball is larger, softer and hollow, unlike a lacrosse ball, which is solid rubber.

Intercrosse as a competitive adult sport is popular in Quebec, Canada, as well as in many European countries, particularly in the Czech Republic. Generally, teams consist of five players per side, and the field size is 20 m (66 ft) wide and 40 m (130 ft) long. Goals for adults are the same size as box lacrosse, 4 ft or 1.2 m in height and width. The international governing body, the Fédération Internationale d'Inter-Crosse, hosts a World Championship bi-annually.

Soft stick lacrosse is a popular way to introduce youth to the sport. It can be played outdoors or indoors and has a developed curriculum for physical education classes.

== International lacrosse ==
Lacrosse has historically been played for the most part in Canada and the United States, with small but dedicated lacrosse communities in the United Kingdom and Australia. Recently, however, lacrosse has begun to flourish at the international level, with teams being established around the world, particularly in Europe and East Asia.

=== World Lacrosse ===
In August 2008, the men's international governing body, the International Lacrosse Federation, merged with the women's, the International Federation of Women's Lacrosse Associations, to form the Federation of International Lacrosse (FIL). The FIL changed its name to World Lacrosse in May 2019. There are currently 62 member nations of World Lacrosse.

=== Tournaments ===
World Lacrosse sponsors five world championship tournaments: the World Lacrosse Championship for men's field, the Women's Lacrosse World Championship for women's, the World Indoor Lacrosse Championship for box lacrosse, as well as the Men's Under-20 World Lacrosse Championships and Women's Under-20 World Lacrosse Championships. Each is held every four years.

Tournament	Editions	First (# teams)	Most recent (# teams)	Most golds (# golds)	Most silvers (# silvers)
World Lacrosse Championship	14	1967 (4)	2023 (30)	United States (11)	Canada (7)
Women's Lacrosse World Championship	11	1982 (6)	2022 (30)	United States (9)	Australia (4)
World Lacrosse Men's U20 Championship	9	1988 (4)	2022 (23)	United States (9)	Canada (7)
World Lacrosse Women's U20 Championship	7	1995 (7)	2019 (22)	United States (5)	Australia (4)
World Indoor Lacrosse Championship	5	2003 (6)	2019 (13)	Canada (5)	Haudenosaunee (5)

The World Lacrosse Championship (WLC) began in 1968 as a four-team invitational tournament sponsored by the International Lacrosse Federation. Until 1990, only the United States, Canada, England, and Australia had entered. With the expansion of the game internationally, the 2014 World Lacrosse Championship was contested by 38 countries. The WLC has been dominated by the United States. Team USA has won 11 of the 14 titles, with Canada winning the other three.

The Women's Lacrosse World Cup (WLWC) began in 1982. The United States has won 9 of the 11 titles, with Australia winning the other two. Canada and England have always finished in the top five. The 2017 tournament was held in England and featured 25 countries.

The first World Indoor Lacrosse Championship (WILC) was held in 2003 and contested by six nations at four sites in Ontario. Canada won the championship by beating the Iroquois Nationals 21–4 in the final. The 2007 championship hosted by the Onondaga Nation included 13 teams. Canada has dominated the competition, winning all five gold medals and never losing a game.

The Iroquois Nationals are the men's national team representing the Six Nations of the Iroquois Confederacy in international field lacrosse competition. The team was admitted to the FIL in 1987. It is the only First Nations team sanctioned for international competition in any sport. The Nationals placed fourth in the 1998, 2002 and 2006 World Lacrosse Championships and third in 2014. The indoor team won the silver medal in all four World Indoor Lacrosse Championships. In 2008, the Iroquois women's team was admitted to the FIL as the Haudenosaunee Nationals. They placed 7th at the 2013 Women's Lacrosse World Cup.

=== Olympic Games ===
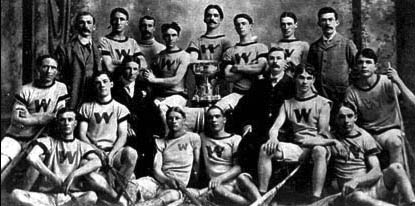
1904 Olympics Gold Medal winning Winnipeg Shamrocks lacrosse team

Field lacrosse was a medal sport in the 1904 and the 1908 Summer Olympics. In 1904, three teams competed in the games held in St. Louis. Two Canadian teams, the Winnipeg Shamrocks and a team of Mohawk people from the Iroquois Confederacy, plus the local St. Louis Amateur Athletic Association team representing the United States participated. The Winnipeg Shamrocks captured the gold medal. The 1908 games held in London, England, featured only two teams, representing Canada and Great Britain. The Canadians again won the gold medal in a single championship match by a score of 14–10.

In the 1928, 1932, and the 1948 Summer Olympics, lacrosse was a demonstration sport. The 1928 Olympics in Amsterdam featured three teams: the United States, Canada, and Great Britain. The 1932 games in Los Angeles featured a three-game exhibition between a Canadian all-star team and the United States. The United States was represented by Johns Hopkins in both the 1928 and 1932 Olympics. The 1948 games featured an exhibition by an "All-England" team organized by the English Lacrosse Union and the collegiate lacrosse team from Rensselaer Polytechnic Institute representing the United States. This exhibition match ended in a 5–5 tie.

Efforts were made to include lacrosse as an exhibition sport at the 1996 Summer Olympics in Atlanta, Georgia, and the 2000 Summer Olympics in Sydney, Australia, but they were not successful.

An obstacle for lacrosse to return to the Olympics has been insufficient international participation. To be considered for the Olympics, a sport had to be played on four continents and by at least 75 countries. Lacrosse is played on all six continents, but as of August 2019 when Ghana joined, there are only 63 countries playing the sport. However, nowadays numeric criteria about widely practiced sports have been abolished. The International Olympic Committee granted provisional status to World Lacrosse in 2018. In August 2022, it was announced that nine sports had made the shortlist to be included in the games, among them lacrosse, with presentations expected to be made later that month. In October 2023, the LA28 Organizing Committee announced that it had recommended lacrosse as one of five sports that may be added to the program for the 2028 Summer Olympics. On October 16, 2023, lacrosse received approval from the International Olympic Committee for inclusion in the 2028 Summer Olympics in Los Angeles.

=== Other ===
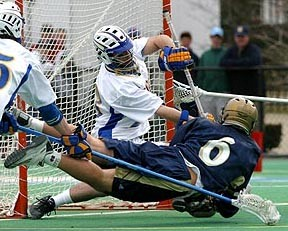
A player taking a "dive shot"

The European Lacrosse Federation (ELF) was established in 1995 and held the first European Lacrosse Championships that year. Originally an annual event, it is now held every four years, in between FIL's men's and women's championships. In 2004, 12 men's and 6 women's teams played in the tournament, making it the largest international lacrosse event of the year. The last men's tournament was in 2016, when 24 countries participated. England won its ninth gold medal out of the ten tournaments played. 2015 was the last women's tournament, when 17 teams participated in the Czech Republic. England won its sixth gold medal, with Wales earning silver and Scotland bronze. These three countries from Great Britain have dominated the women's championships, earning all but three medals since the tournament began in 1996. There are currently 29 members of the ELF, they make up the majority of nations in the FIL.

The Asia Pacific Lacrosse Union was founded in 2004 by Australia, Hong Kong, South Korea and Japan. It currently has 12 members and holds the Asia Pacific Championship for both men's and women's teams every two years.

Lacrosse, in 10 x 10 format, was played in the World Games for the first time at the 2017 World Games held in Poland. Only women's teams took part in the competition. The United States won the gold medal defeating Canada in the finals. Australia won the bronze medal match. The Haudenosaunee Nationals women's lacrosse team could not participate.

Both men and women tournaments, in sixes format, were held in the 2022 World Games in Birmingham, Alabama, USA. Women tournament will be played again, in same format, in 2025 World games.

== Lacrosse in the United States ==
=== College lacrosse ===
==== Men's college lacrosse ====
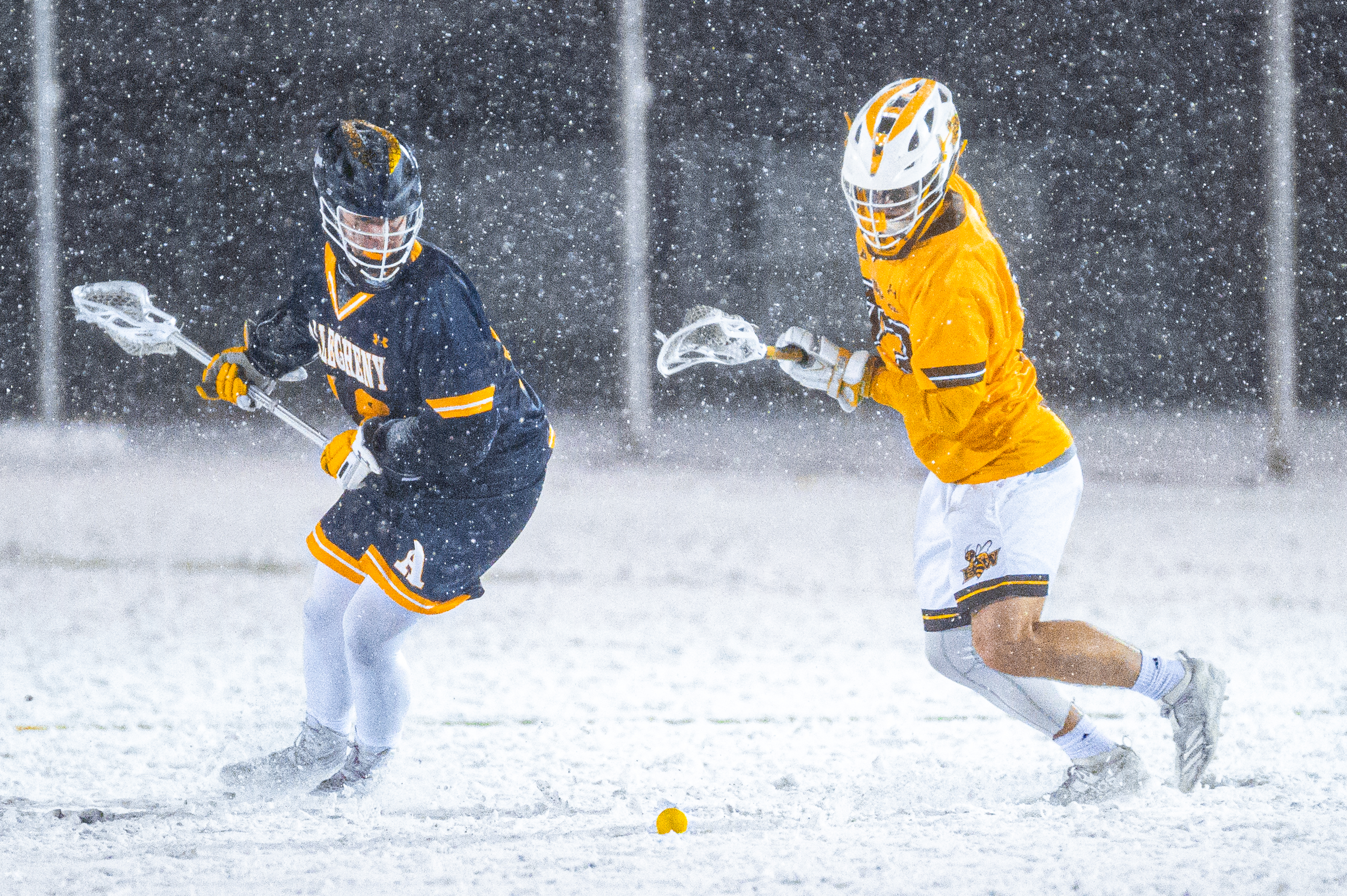
A men's college lacrosse match between the Allegheny Gators and Baldwin Wallace Yellow Jackets in 2020

Collegiate lacrosse in the United States is played at the NCAA, NAIA and club levels. There are currently 71 NCAA Division I men's lacrosse teams, 93 Division II teams, and 236 Division III teams. Thirty-two schools participate at the NAIA level. 184 men's club teams compete in the Men's Collegiate Lacrosse Association, including most universities and colleges outside the northeastern United States. The National College Lacrosse League and Great Lakes Lacrosse League are two other lower-division club leagues. In Canada, 14 teams from Ontario and Quebec play field lacrosse in the fall in the Canadian University Field Lacrosse Association.

The first U. S. intercollegiate men's lacrosse game was played on November 22, 1877, between New York University and Manhattan College. An organizing body for the sport, the U. S. National Lacrosse Association, was founded in 1879 and the first intercollegiate lacrosse tournament was held in 1881, with Harvard beating Princeton 3–0 in the championship game. Annual post-season championships were awarded by a variety of early lacrosse associations through the 1930s. From 1936 to 1972, the United States Intercollegiate Lacrosse Association awarded the Wingate Memorial Trophy to the best college lacrosse team each year.

The NCAA began sponsoring a men's lacrosse championship in 1971, when Cornell took the first title over Maryland, 12–6. Syracuse has 10 Division I titles, Johns Hopkins 9, and Princeton 6. The NCAA national championship weekend tournament draws over 80,000 fans.

==== Women's college lacrosse ====
There are currently 112 Division I women's lacrosse teams, 109 Division II teams, and 282 Division III teams. There are 36 NAIA women's lacrosse teams. The NCAA started sponsoring a women's lacrosse championship in 1982. Maryland has traditionally dominated women's intercollegiate play, producing many head coaches and U.S. national team players. The Terrapins won seven consecutive NCAA championships from 1995 through 2001. Princeton's women's teams have made it to the final game seven times since 1993 and have won three NCAA titles, in 1993, 2002, and 2003. In recent years, Northwestern has become a force, winning the national championship from 2005 through 2009. Maryland ended Northwestern's streak by defeating the Wildcats in the 2010 final, however, Northwestern won the next two titles in 2011 and 2012. Maryland again claimed the national championship in 2014, 2015, and 2017.

The Women's Collegiate Lacrosse Associates (WCLA) is a collection of over 260 college club teams that are organized by US Lacrosse. Teams are organized into two divisions and various leagues.

=== Professional lacrosse ===
==== Active leagues ====
===== National Lacrosse League =====
The National Lacrosse League (NLL) is a men's semi-professional box lacrosse league in North America. The NLL currently has fifteen teams, ten in the United States and five in Canada. The 18-game regular season runs from December to April; games are always on the weekends. The champion is awarded the National Lacrosse League Cup in early June.

Games are played in ice rinks with artificial turf covering the ice. Venues range from NHL arenas seating 19,000 to smaller arenas with under 10,000 capacity. In 2017, average attendance ranged from 3,200 per game in Vancouver to over 15,000 in Buffalo. Overall, the league averaged 9,500 people per game.

With an average salary around $20,000 per season, players have regular jobs, mostly non-lacrosse related, and live in different cities, flying into town for games. Canadians and Native Americans make up over 90% of the players.

The NLL started in 1987 as the Eagle Pro Box Lacrosse League. Teams in Philadelphia, New Jersey, Baltimore and Washington, DC, played a 6-game season. The league operated as the Major Indoor Lacrosse League from 1989 to 1997, when there were six teams each playing a 10-game schedule. The current NLL name began in the 1998 season, which included the first Canadian team.

The most successful franchises have been the Toronto Rock and the Philadelphia Wings; each has won six championships.

===== Premier Lacrosse League =====
In October 2018, former MLL player Paul Rabil branched away from the MLL and created the Premier Lacrosse League. The PLL focuses on being a traveling lacrosse league that will bring the best players in the world to different cities in the United States.

Each player has a minimum salary of $25,000, equity in the league, and medical benefits. The average salary is $35,000. The most successful team is Whipsnakes Lacrosse Club which has two championships.

Since its inaugural season in 2019, the PLL has expanded to eight teams and merged with the MLL.

Beginning with the 2022 season, the PLL has had a broadcasting deal with ESPN.

Prior to the 2023 season the PLL announced that they would be assigning home-cities to each team for the 2024 season. The touring model would not cease, however, with each team hosting one regular season weekend where they play a doubleheader. There will also be two neutral site weekends.

===== Women's Lacrosse League =====
Women's Lacrosse League is a professional women's league that will play lacrosse sixes beginning in 2025.

==== Defunct leagues ====
===== Athletes Unlimited Lacrosse =====
Athletes Unlimited Lacrosse was a women's lacrosse league that operated from 2021–2024. Rather than having set teams, at the end of each week, the top four players are determined by a point system and named captains of next week's teams. They then draft their team for the next week. The champion of the league is the player that scores the most points. There were 56 players in the league in 2023.

===== Major League Lacrosse =====
Major League Lacrosse (MLL) was a semi-professional field lacrosse league started in 2001 with six teams in the Northeastern United States. The leagues final year had six teams, playing a week long round-robin regular season. MLL rules were based on NCAA men's rules with several exceptions, such as a 16-yard 2-point line and a 60-second shot clock.

MLL venues ranged from small stadiums with under 10,000 capacity to an NFL stadium in Denver that seats 76,000. Overall league average attendance is around 4,000 per game, although the leagues Denver Outlaws had averaged around 10,000 per game since their founding in 2006.

The rookie salary was $7,000 per season and most players made between $10,000 and $20,000 per season. Therefore, the players had other jobs, often non-lacrosse related, and travel to games on the weekends.

The Chesapeake Bayhawks, who had played in the Annapolis–Baltimore–Washington, DC area since 2001, were the most successful franchise with six championships.

On December 16, 2020, it was announced that the MLL was merging all operations with the Premier Lacrosse League. The PLL added the Boston Cannons and rebranded them to "Cannons Lacrosse Club". No other MLL teams were added into the PLL.

===== United Women's Lacrosse League =====
The United Women's Lacrosse League (UWLX), was a four-team women's lacrosse league, was launched in 2016. The teams are the Baltimore Ride, Boston Storm, Long Island Sound and Philadelphia Force. Long Island won the first two championships. The league closed in 2020.

===== Women's Professional Lacrosse League =====
The Women's Professional Lacrosse League was a professional women's lacrosse league with 5 teams that started in 2018. It closed in 2020.

== Equipment ==
=== Stick ===
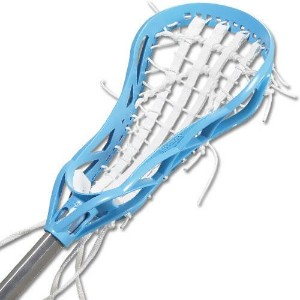
Women's lacrosse stick

The lacrosse stick has two parts, the head and the shaft. There are three parts to the head: the scoop, sidewall, and pocket. The scoop is the top of the stick that affects picking up ground ball as well as passing and shooting. The sidewall is the side of the head that affects the depth of the head and the stiffness. The pocket is the leather or nylon mesh attached to the sidewall and scoop. A wider pocket allows an easier time catching balls but will also cause less ball control. A narrower pocket makes catching harder but allows more ball retention and accuracy.

Shafts are usually made of hollow metal. They are octagonal, instead of round, in order to provide a better grip. Most are made of aluminum, titanium, scandium, or alloys, but some shafts are made from other materials, including wood, plastic, carbon fiber, or fiberglass.

Stick length, both shaft and head together, is governed by NCAA regulations, which require that men's sticks be from 40 to 42 inches (100 to 110 cm) long for offensive players, and 52 to 72 inches (130 to 180 cm) long for defensemen, and 40 to 72 inches (100 to 180 cm) long for goalies.

Women's sticks must be an overall length of 35.5–43.25 inches (90.2–109.9 cm). The head must be seven to nine inches wide and the top of the ball must remain above the side walls when dropped in the pocket. The goalkeeper's stick must be 35.5–48 inches (90–122 cm) long. The head of the goalie's stick can up to 12 inches (30 cm) wide and the pocket may be mesh.

=== Ball ===
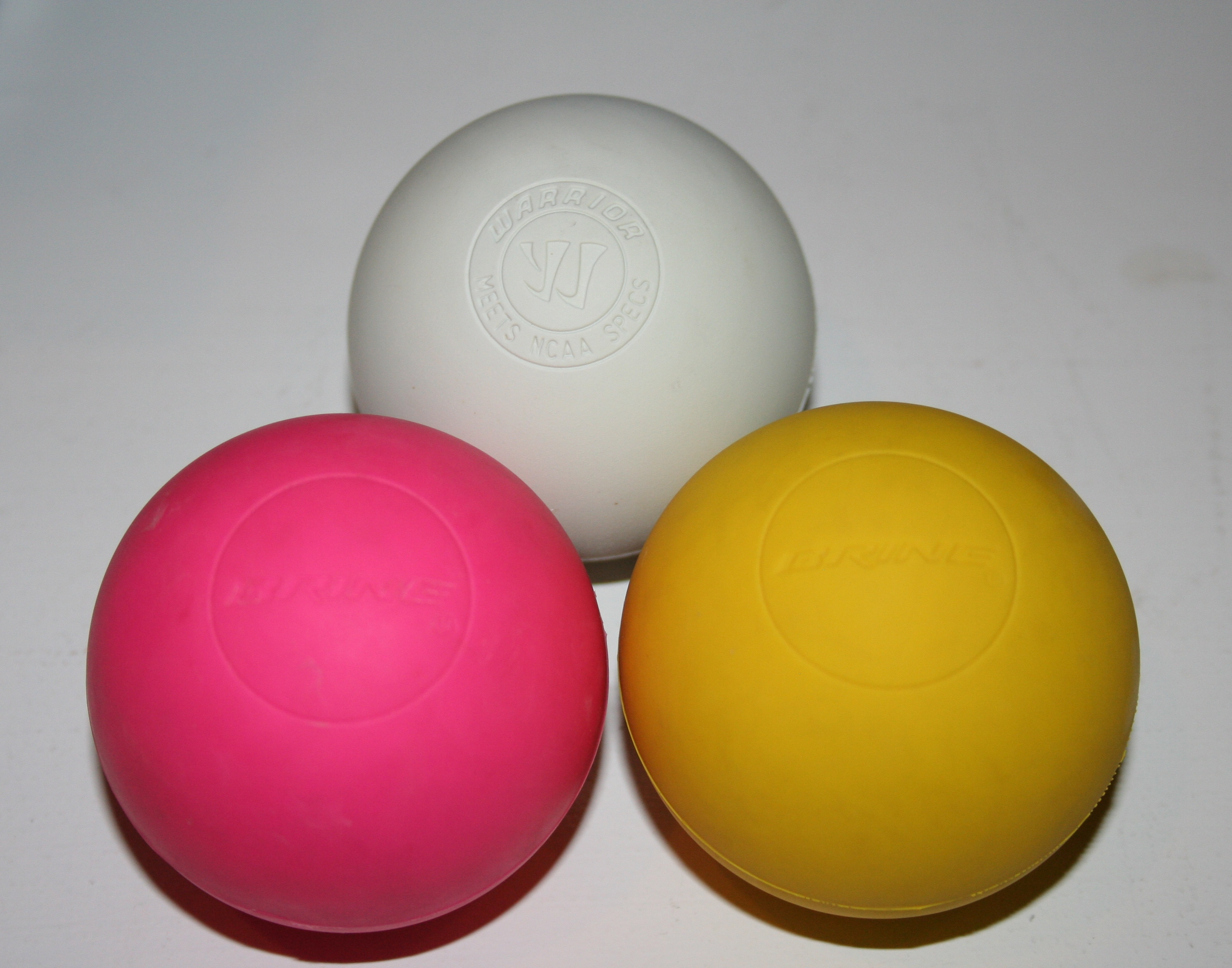
typical lacrosse balls

The ball is made of solid rubber. It is typically white for men's lacrosse, or yellow for women's lacrosse; but is also produced in a wide variety of colors, such as yellow, orange or lime green according to the Men's Lacrosse Rules and Interpretations.

=== Men's field protective equipment ===
Men's field lacrosse protective equipment contains a pair of gloves, elbow pads, shoulder pads, helmet, mouthguard, and cleats. Pads differ in size and protection from player to player based on position, ability, comfort and preference. For example, many attack players wear larger and more protective elbow pads to protect themselves from checks thrown at them while defenders typically wear smaller and less protective pads due to their smaller possibility of being checked and goalies usually wear no elbow pads due to the very limited opportunities of being checked. A goalkeeper must also wear a large protective chest pad to cover their stomach and chest and a plastic neck guard that connects to the chin of their helmet to protect them from shots hitting their windpipe. In addition, male goalkeepers are required to wear a protective cup.

=== Men's box protective equipment ===
Men's box players wear more protective gear than field players due to the increased physical contact and more permissive checking rules. Cross-checking in the back is allowed by the rules. Runners wear larger and heavier elbow pads and stronger shoulder pads that extend down the back of the player. Most players wear rib pads as well. Box goalies wear equipment very similar to ice hockey goalies, the leg blockers are somewhat smaller, although the shoulder pads are bigger than ice hockey pads.

=== Women's field protective equipment ===
Women's field players are not required to wear protective equipment besides eyewear and a mouthguard. Eyegear is a metal cage covering the eyes attached with a strap around the back of the head. In recent years, there has been discussion about allowing or requiring padded headgear to protect against concussions. Women goalies wear a helmet, gloves, and chest protector.

== Variants ==
Variant			Men	Box	Women	Sixes	Intercrosse
Image							
Country of origin			North America	Canada	Scotland		Canada
Governing Body			World Lacrosse				
Pitch	Shape		Rectangular	Rounded rectangular	Rectangular		Rectangular
Pitch	Length		110 meters	55-61 meters	100 meters	70 meters	40 meters
Pitch	Width		60 meters	24-28 meters	50-60 meters	36 meters	20 meters
Pitch	Barriers		No	Yes	No		
Pitch	Surface			artificial turf, concrete			wood
Pitch	Goals		6 feet (1.8 m) x 6 feet (1.8 m)	57 inches (1.4 m) x 4 feet (1.2 m)	1.83 meters x 1.83 meters		48 inches (1.2 m) x 45 inches (1.1 m)
Equipment	Ball	Circumference	7.75–8 inches (19.7–20.3 cm)		20-20.3 centimeters	19.7-20.3 centimeters	23-25 centimeters
Equipment	Ball	Weight	5–5.25 ounces (142–149 g)		142-149 grams		80-100 grams
Equipment	Ball	Bounce	45–49 inches (110–120 cm) on wooden floor from height of 72 inches (180 cm)		1.1-1.3 meters on wooden floor dropped from height of 1.8 meters		
Equipment	Ball	Material	rubber		elastomeric		rubber
Equipment	Stick	Length	40–42 inches (1.0–1.1 m); Goalkeeper: 40–72 inches (1.0–1.8 m)		90-110 centimeters; Goalkeeper: 90-140 centimeters	100-110 centimeters; Goalkeeper: 100-135 centimeters (women), 100-140 centimeters (men)	95-112.5 centimeters
Equipment	Stick	Head	Width: 6–10 inches (0.15–0.25 m), goalkeeper: 6–15 inches (0.15–0.38 m)	Width: 4.5–7 inches (0.11–0.18 m), goalkeeper: 13 inches (0.33 m)	Width: 15-16 centimeters, goalkeeper: 15.24-38.1 centimeters	Women: Width: 15-16 centimeters; Length: 25.4-30.5 centimeters	Width: 17-17.5 centimeters
Equipment	Stick	Head	Length: 10 inches (0.25 m)		Length: 25.4-30.5 centimeters, goalkeeper: 41.9 centimeters	Men: Width: 6–10 inches (0.15–0.25 m), goalkeeper: 6–15 inches (0.15–0.38 m); Length: 10 inches (0.25 m)	Length: 26- 27.5 centimeters
Equipment	Stick	Weight			567 grams		280-380 grams
Equipment	Stick	Material	Head: wood, plastic, fiberglass, nylon, leather, rubber, gut, synthetic material; Shaft: wood, plastic, fiberglass, nylon, leather, rubber, gut, and/or any other synthetic material	hollow synthetic or metal material	Head: wood, plastic, fiberglass, nylon, leather, rubber, gut, synthetic material	Head: wood, plastic, fiberglass, nylon, leather, rubber, gut, synthetic material; Shaft: wood, plastic, fiberglass, nylon, leather, rubber, gut, and/or any other synthetic material	Head: plastic.; Shaft: fibreglass, metal or wood.
Equipment	Uniform	Non protective	Jersey, pants, shoes		shirt, bottom (kilt, skirt or shorts), shoes with cleats	jerseys and shorts/skorts or kilt	running shoes, shorts, jersey
Equipment	Uniform	Protective gear	helmet, mouthguard, facemask, chinstrap, gloves, chest pad	helmet, mouthguard, facemask, chinstrap, protective gloves, shoulder/vest pad, rib pads	Gloves, nose guards, eye guards, mouthguard	Women: gloves, nose guards, eye guards, mouthguard; Men: helmet with facemask and chinstrap	Goalkeeper: helmet with cage, gloves, neck protector
Number of players			10	6	10	6	5
Duration			4 x 15 minutes			4 x 8 minutes	4 x 12 minutes
Offside			Yes	No	Yes		No
Face-off			Yes		Draw	Yes	No
Tournaments	World championship		Yes				
Tournaments	Olympic		Official: 1904 and 1908; Demonstration: 1928, 1932 and 1948	No		2028	No
Tournaments	World Games		No			Yes	No
Tournaments	Professional leagues		Yes		No	Yes	No

== See also ==
- Polocrosse, a version of lacrosse played on horseback
- Hurling, an ancient Gaelic team sport played with sticks and a ball
- Indigenous North American stickball
