= SLL =

SLL may refer to:

- Steve Lee Lukather (born 1957), American musician
- Salalah Airport, Oman, IATA code
- Sierra Leonean leone, the currency of Sierra Leone
- Small lymphocytic lymphoma, a common form of leukemia
- Socialist Labour League, a Trotskyist political group in the United Kingdom
- Saint Lupicin Lions, an Intercrosse team located in Coteaux du Lion.
- SLL (South Korean company) (acronym for Studio LuluLala), South Korean drama production company
- sll, Shift Left Logical, an RISC-V instruction
