= 2008 FIIC Intercrosse Men's World Championships =

The 2008 FIIC Intercrosse Men's World Championships was the ninth Intercrosse World Championship. The championship was played in Switzerland from 15 to 20 July 2008. The Czech Republic defended their title.

== Participants ==
- Canada
- Czech Republic
- France
- Hungary
- Italy
- Switzerland

== Preliminary round ==
Team	Pld	W	D	L	GF	GA	GD	Pts
Canada	5	5	0	0	149	95	+54	10
Czech Republic	5	4	0	1	174	94	+80	8
Italy	5	3	0	2	135	111	+24	6
France	5	2	0	3	143	124	+19	4
Switzerland	5	1	0	4	95	123	-28	2
Hungary	5	0	0	5	45	194	-149	0

Hungary	8–39	Canada

Canada	27–16	Switzerland

France	22–28	Italy

Italy	21–40	Czech Republic

Czech Republic	40–21	France

Hungary	12–30	Switzerland

Czech Republic	40–9	Hungary

Italy	18–27	Canada

France	30–12	Switzerland

Czech Republic	24–25	Canada

Hungary	13–41	France

Czech Republic	30–18	Switzerland

Canada	31–29	France

Italy	44–3	Hungary

Switzerland	19–24	Italy

== Play off ==
=== 5th place ===
Switzerland	29–20	Hungary

=== Semifinals ===
Czech Republic	41–25	Italy

Canada	30–16	France

=== Bronze medal game ===
Italy	29–26	France

=== Gold medal game ===
Czech Republic	29–15	Canada

== Final standings ==
Team
1 Czech Republic
2 Canada
3 Italy
4 France
5 Switzerland
6 Hungary
