= FIIC Intercrosse World Championship =

- Sport: Men's intercrosse
- Founded: 1999
- Most recent champion: Czech Republic
- Most titles: Czech Republic (10th title)

FIIC Intercrosse World Championship
- Sport: Women's intercrosse
- Founded: 2001
- Most recent champion: Czech Republic
- Most titles: Czech Republic (8th title)

The FIIC Intercrosse World Championship is the bi-annual international championship for intercrosse. The World Championship is organised by the Fédération Internationale d’Inter-Crosse (FIIC). The men's competition was started in 1999 and the women's in 2001. The men's and women's tournaments are usually held in the same venue.

== Men's results ==
Year	Gold	Silver	Bronze	Host city	Host country
1999	Czech Republic	Quebec	France	Auderghem	Belgium
2000	Quebec	Czech Republic	Italy	Kostelec	Czech Republic
2001	Quebec	Czech Republic	Italy	Lecco	Italy
2002	Czech Republic	Quebec	Italy	Szombathely	Hungary
2003	Quebec	France	Canada	Sherbrooke	Canada
2004	Czech Republic	Canada	Italy	Sursee	Switzerland
2005	Czech Republic	Italy	France	Prague	Czech Republic
2006	Czech Republic	Italy	Canada	Szombathely	Hungary
2008	Czech Republic	Canada	Italy	Kriens	Switzerland
2012	Czech Republic	Italy	Germany	Prague	Czech Republic
2013	Czech Republic	Germany	Canada	Lons-le-Saunier	France
2016	Czech Republic	Quebec	France	Montréal	Canada
2018	Czech Republic	Quebec	Germany	Prague	Czech Republic

== Performance by team ==
Team	1999 (Belgium) (6)	2000 (Czech Republic) (6)	2001 (Italy) (6)	2002 (Hungary) (6)	2003 (Canada) (5)	2004 (Switzerland) (7)	2005 (Czech Republic) (5)	2006 (Hungary) (7)	2008 (Switzerland) (6)	2012 (Czech Republic) (5)	2013 (France) (5)	2016 (Canada) ()	2018 (Czech Republic) (5)
(Switzerland) (France) Alpine team										5th			
Belgium	4th	6th											
/ Quebec/Canada	2nd	1st	1st	2nd	1st	2nd		3rd	2nd		3rd	2nd	2nd
Czech Republic	1st	2nd	2nd	1st		1st	1st	1st	1st	1st	1st	1st	1st
France	3rd	4th	4th		2nd	4th	3rd	5th	4th		5th	3rd	4th
Germany	6th	5th								3rd	2nd		3rd
Ghana			6th										
Hungary				5th		6th	5th	7th	6th				
Italy	5th	3rd	3rd	3rd	4th	3rd	2nd	2nd	3rd	2nd	4th		
Poland				6th									
Switzerland			5th	4th	5th	5th		6th	5th				
Slovakia						7th	4th	4th		4th			

=== Medals table ===
Rank	Nation	Gold	Silver	Bronze	Total
1	Czech Republic (CZE)	10	2	0	12
2	Canada (CAN)	3	6	2	11
3	Italy (ITA)	0	3	5	8
4	France (FRA)	0	1	3	4
5	Germany (GER)	0	1	2	3
Totals (5 entries)		13	13	12	38

Until 2002 and again since 2016, Canada has played under the name Quebec.

== Women's results ==
Year	Gold	Silver	Bronze	Host city	Host country
2001	Czech Republic	Quebec	Italy	Lecco	Italy
2002	Czech Republic	Quebec	Europe	Szombathely	Hungary
2003	Quebec	Canada	France	Sherbrooke	Canada
2004	Czech Republic	Canada	Switzerland	Sursee	Switzerland
2005	Czech Republic	Canada	Hungary	Prague	Czech Republic
2008	Czech Republic	Canada	Switzerland	Kriens	Switzerland
2012	Czech Republic	Germany	Canada	Prague	Czech Republic
2013	Czech Republic	Germany	Canada	Lons-le-Saunier	France
2016	Czech Republic	Quebec	(Europe) / Euro-Quebec	Montréal	Canada
2018	Czech Republic	Germany	Quebec	Prague	Czech Republic

=== Medals table ===
Rank	Nation	Gold	Silver	Bronze	Total
1	Czech Republic (CZE)	8	0	0	8
2	Canada (CAN)	1	7	2	10
3	Germany (GER)	0	2	0	2
4	Switzerland (SUI)	0	0	2	2
5	France (FRA)	0	0	1	1
5	Hungary (HUN)	0	0	1	1
5	Italy (ITA)	0	0	1	1
Totals (7 entries)		9	9	7	25

Until 2002 and again since 2016, Canada has played under the name Quebec.
