= Lacrosse strategy =

Strategy for a sports game

The game of lacrosse is played using a combination of offensive and defensive strategies. Offensively, the objective of the game is to score by shooting the ball into an opponent's goal, using the lacrosse stick to catch, carry, and pass the ball. Defensively, the objective is to keep the opposing team from scoring and to dispossess them of the ball through the use of stick checking and body contact or positioning.

== Settled offense: the 2-3-1 ==
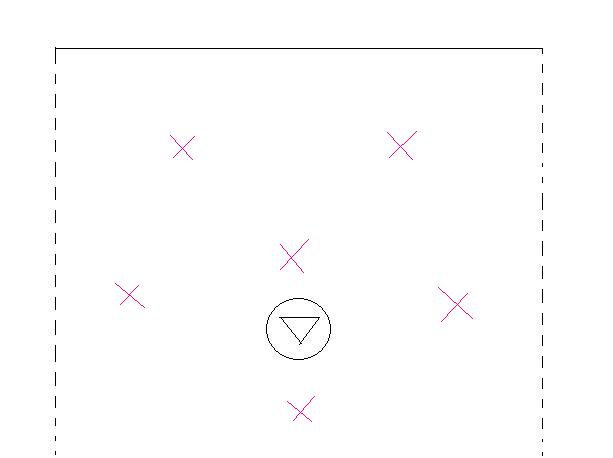
2-3-1 Offense

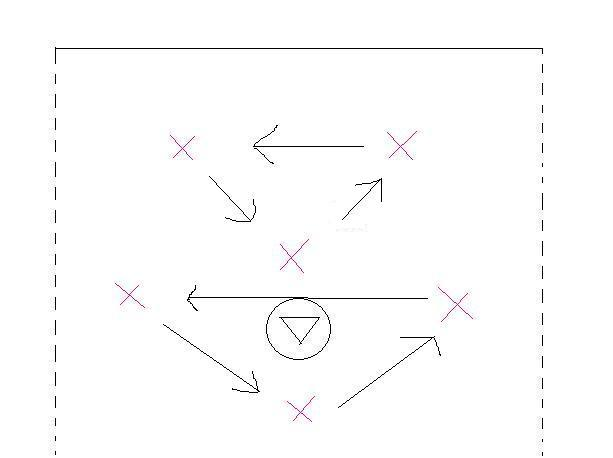
2-3-1 Triangle Rotations

The most common offense used in settled situations is known as the "2-3-1" (sometimes counted in the opposite direction, as a 1-3-2, or shortened to be called the 1-3 or 13). The numbering begins with the two midfielders at the top of the field, then continues to the two attackmen on the wings and the midfielder on the crease, and finally the last attackman located at "X", the position behind the goal. The offensive team should pass the ball around the perimeter and look for weaknesses in the defense. They will also rotate, in two triangles. The midfielders will rotate in a triangle, across the top, and to and from the crease. The attackmen will rotate to and from X, and across the crease to the opposite wing. A player may "carry" the ball in a rotation as well; for example, a middle at the top right will carry to the top left, while the top left middle will cut to the crease, and the crease midfielder will cut into the space where the ball carrier came from.

Driving to the goal is aided by the triangle rotations, as it is difficult for the defense to keep track of the cutting players and the player who is attempting to drive to the goal. Some players prefer to drive from the midfield positions, as they do not have to turn to shoot, and they are often driving against a short stick defender. Other players prefer to drive from the wings and X, as it is often easier to pass to other players, who are more likely to be facing the goal for an easier shot.

== Other settled offenses ==
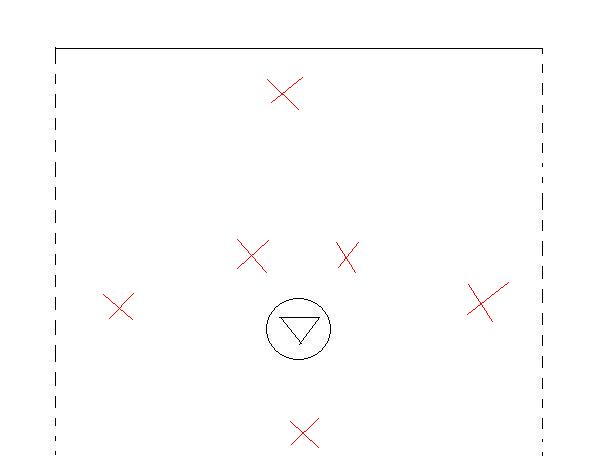
1-4-1 Offense

There are other offenses which are commonly used. The second most common offense is probably the 1-4-1, where there is only one midfielder at the top of the field, two midfielders on the crease and two attackmen on the wings, and an attackmen at X. The formation somewhat resembles a cross. This offense is often considered better for driving, because it has a large amount of open space. The offense also allows the two players on the crease to attempt to set picks to get open, and screen the goalie on shots from the outside.

Another common offense is known as the "invert", and is more commonly used at the college level. This offense is structurally the same as a 2-3-1, but the midfielders and attackmen switch, or invert their positions. This is designed to allow midfielders to drive from the wings and from X against a short-stick midfielder, instead of against a longstick defensemen who would normally defend the player at these positions. It also allows attackmen to drive from the top of the field, where may they have a better chance of scoring, because they are facing the goal.

However, this offense can leave the team open to a fast-break, because when the ball is turned over, the midfielders are very far from their own defensive half. Some teams elect to send their attackmen back to their defensive half if there is a fast break, although this has the obvious disadvantage of forcing a primarily offensive player to play defense.

Another offense is the 1-3-2, which is somewhat similar to the 2-3-1 flipped upside down. In this offense, there is one midfielder at the top of the field, two midfielders on the wings and an attackmen on the crease, and two attackmen below the goal line. This offense is designed to allow the attackmen more opportunities to drive from below the goal, and allows the top midfielder a very open field to drive to the goal.

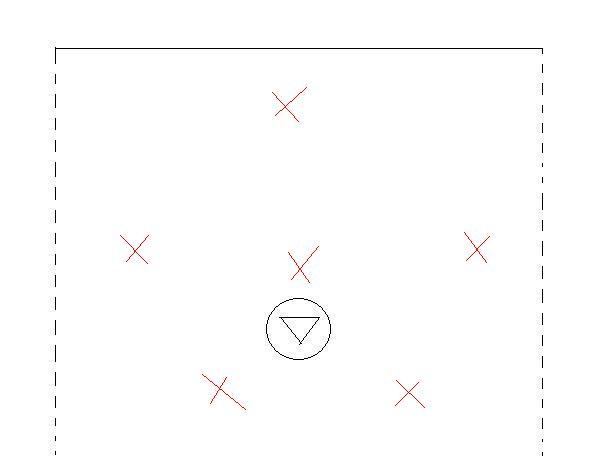
1-3-2 Offense

Another, less commonly used offense is the 2-2-2. In this offense there are two midfielders at the top left and top right corners, a midfielder and attackmen on the crease, and two attackmen on the bottom right and bottom left corners. This offense resembles an X. This is a very complicated offense, and is quite rare even at the college level. It is designed to allow the crease players to set picks and cut, as in the 1-4-1, as well as allow players to drive from the corners. When properly implemented, it is very difficult to defend. If an individual defender is beaten on a drive, another defender must come from the crease, leaving a player open close to the goal, or from a corner, in which case it may not arrive in time. It is very difficult for the offense, as offensive player must routinely make long passes between the corners, and must all be able to handle the ball competently, as they cannot make a short outlet pass if they get into trouble.

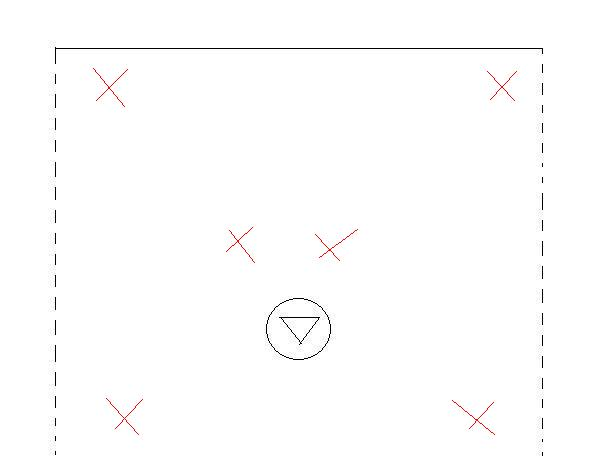
2-2-2 Offense

== Defense in settled situations ==
As in basketball, there are two basic defensive styles: man-to-man and zone. Man-to-man, or simply man defense, is more commonly used in lacrosse. This is due to the lack of a shot clock at most levels of competition, so a man defense will tend to force more turnovers.

In a man defense, every defensive player will be responsible for one offensive player, as well as having a support responsibility in the "slide" system. A slide is when a defensive player is beaten on a drive, and another player must slide over to stop the player with the ball, and the other defensive players must attempt to cover the uncovered players until the defense is recovered. Teams can use a "slide from adjacent" meaning that a defender will have responsibility to stop the driving player if he breaks through on his side; in this system, if the attackmen at X is driving to the right, the defensemen covering the right wing attackman would slide, whereas if he drove left, the defensemen covering the left wing attackmen would slide. The other option is implement a "slide from the crease" whereby the defensive player on the crease always slides, and one of the other defenders will pick up his man.

The other option is to use a zone defense. The most common, generic defense, is known as a 3-3 (similar to the 2-3 in basketball). The area above the goal line is divided like a rectangle into 6 zones. The long stick defensemen will cover the bottom 3 zones, and the midfielders will cover the top 3 zones. Unlike in most man defenses, defenders do not go very far below the goal line, so often an attackmen at X can simply hold the ball and wait for an open pass. This is why some run four long poles (one LSM) on the corners and have two midfielders in the middle, then when the ball goes to X the low midfielder drops and plays him behind the goal the top midfielder fills into the low position until the ball is moved from X and then the midfielders go back to their original positions in the 3-3.

Other zone defenses are more tailored to the offense that is being used, such as the 2-3-1 zone, in which the defensive players mirror the offensive players positioning, but when offensive players rotate, they are "passed off" to the next zone, rather than being followed as in a man defense system.

Overall, man defenses are favored as they allow players to strip the ball and attempt to intercept passes more aggressively. However, they also require faster athletes, and it can be difficult to recover when a defender is beaten. As a result, some teams choose to run a zone defense. Zone defenses also can be easier for younger athletes, and are used more commonly at the youth level. Zone defenses can also be used when a team has a large lead, and wants to make sure they opposing team cannot score goals quickly.

== Fast-break situations ==
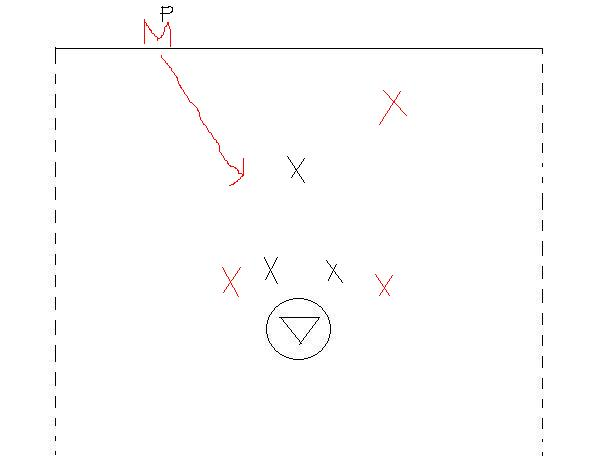
"L" fast break formation. Defense is in triangle

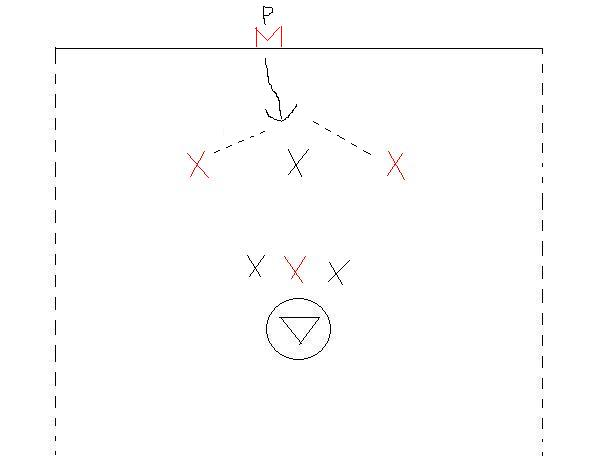
"V"fast break formation. Middie attempts to draw defenseman, then passes left or right.

Fast breaks occur when an offensive player has the ball, and comes into the defensive half without anyone covering him. Fast breaks usually occur because a player caught an outlet pass from the goalie, won a face-off, or stripped the ball on defense and carries it the other way.

One way of aligning for a fast break is the "L". In this case, one attackman aligns to the top right, another to the right just above the goal line, and the last on the left just above the goal line, forming an L. The fast break player who is carrying the ball comes into the top left. If the fast break player is coming on the right, then the top attackman will simply switch to the left side. The fast break player will attempt to draw a defensemen, then pass to the top attackmen.

The other common way of aligning is in a V. In this case, one attackman is aligned on the crease, and the other two are aligned at top right and top left. The fast break player comes down the middle of the field, and can pass to the left or right. The goal of both fast break offenses is to draw a defensive player, and quickly pass, until a player is uncovered and open for a shot.

There is only one commonly used defensive system for fast breaks, the triangle zone. Defensive players begin in a triangle, with one player at the top, or "point" and two players low. Once the ball arrives, defensive players will rotate to where the ball is passed, and do everything they can to prevent a goal until help arrives. It is very important that defensemen remain close to the goalie, or it will be easier to get an offensive player open for a shot.

== Unsettled clears ==
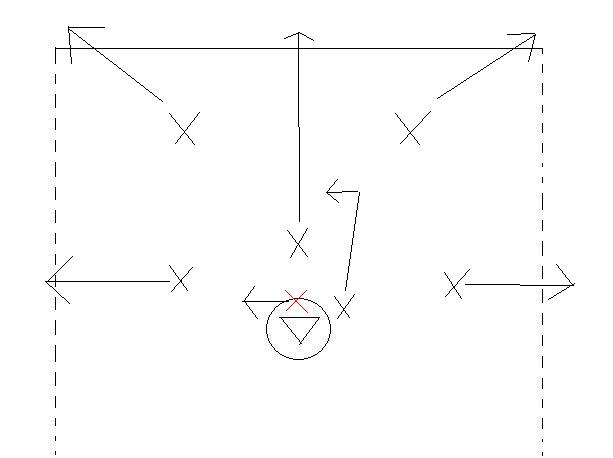
Breaking to get open after a shot. Goalie has the ball, and goes left if he cannot find a pass within 4 seconds.

The term "clear" refers to when the defense gets the ball in their half of the field, and tries to get the ball across half-field to their offensive zone. The term "ride" refers to the efforts of the opposing attackmen and midfielders to recover the ball before it can be brought into their defensive zone.

When the defense gets the ball in an unsettled situation, such as a defensive player picking up a ground ball, intercepting a pass, or the goalie making a save, the defense will try to spread out and try to get open for a pass. When a defensive player picks the ball up behind the goal, or on a far when, they will often pass to the goalie, because the goalie cannot be checked while standing in the crease, and thus has several seconds to look for an open pass. Generally, the defensemen will try to move out to the "alley" between the box line and the sideline, and midfielders will try to break upfield and towards the corners, all in an attempt to get a player open, and force the opposing players to spread themselves out.

The players who are riding will generally try to harass the player with the ball before he can pass to the goalie or pass upfield, and drop back, generally to around the box line, if they are unsuccessful at doing this. The reason for dropping back to the box line is that the defense has 10 seconds from when they pick the ball up to clear the ball across midfield. This means that the riding players can force a turnover by stripping the ball or intercepting a pass, or by forcing the clearing team to make many passes and take more than 10 seconds in clearing the ball.

== Rides and clears in settled situations ==
One example of a settled clear. X's are short-sticks.

Zone ride. Ball is on left side. Attack will shift towards the side of the ball.

10 man ride. Note the riding goalie is out of the cage,(Black) playing man-to-man

A settled clear occurs when one team gets the ball in their defensive half of the field after a stoppage in play. Because of the stoppage, both teams will have time to set their players up in an optimal fashion. As a result, teams generally use scripted plays in settled rides and clears.

One clear that is commonly used in settled situations is known as an "L" clear. In this clear, a midfielder begins with the ball, the goalie is in the middle of the field, one defenseman is in the "alley" even with the midfielder, another defensemen is in the top left corner, and the last defensemen is above the box line in the middle of the field. One midfielder is in the top left of the field, and the final midfielder is across the midfield line, above the defenseman.

There are several different systems that the riding team may use. In a zone clear, the riding players divide into 6 different zones, with the attackmen generally around the box line, and the midfielders around the half-field line. Zone rides generally aim to force the clearing team to make long passes, or take 20 seconds to cross the half-field line. Zone rides are usually easier for less defensively skilled attackmen, and are less likely to result in fast breaks.

Another system is to use man-to-man defense, usually leaving the goalie or a defenseman with weak skills unguarded, and forcing them to bring the ball up on their own. Man-to-man rides often work well with attackmen who are also very good at defense. The danger in this system is that the unguarded player may simply break through and easily clear the ball, or that the man-to-man coverage may be blown, and a fast break given up.

An aggressive variation of the man-to-man system is known at the "ten man ride". In this system, the riding team's goalie will come out of the goal to cover an attackman, allowing a defenseman to cover a midfielder, which in turn allows a midfielder to cover a defenseman, and finally one of the attackmen to cover the goalie. The danger in this system is that it is possible that none of the clearing midfielders will cross the mid-field line, so that the defenseman will not be able to stay onsides and cover him (remember, teams must always have 4 players on their defensive side of the field). It is also possible that the clearing team may catch the goalie out of the cage, and be able to take an open shot. This riding system is often used when a team is down and needs to recover the ball to catch up.

== Man-up and Man-down ==
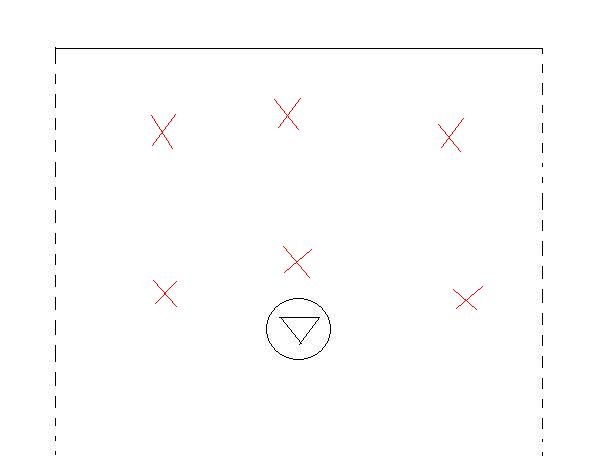
3-3 Offense

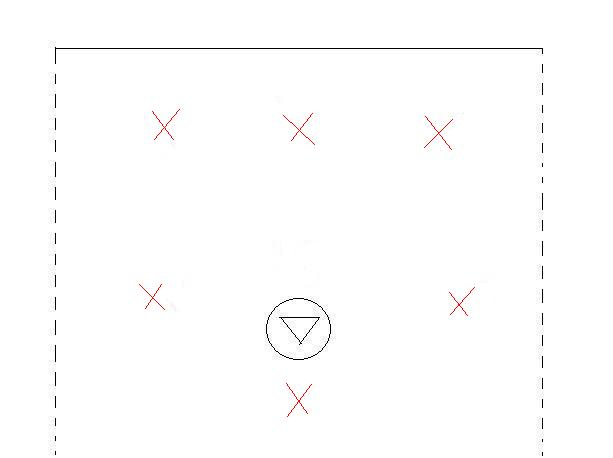
3-2-1 "Circle" Offense

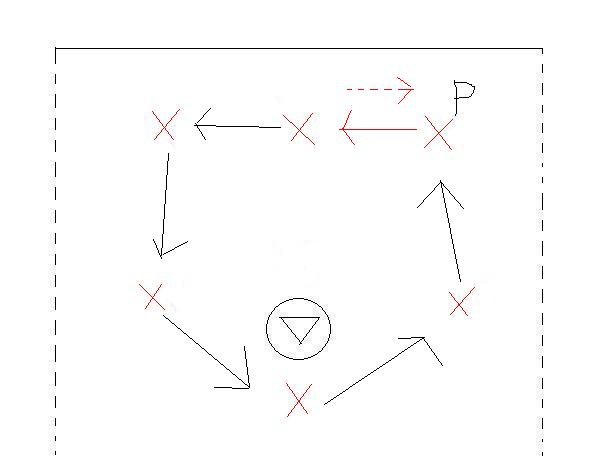
Rotation and "carry". Red arrow is the carry across the top, dotted arrow is the "pass back" for an open shot

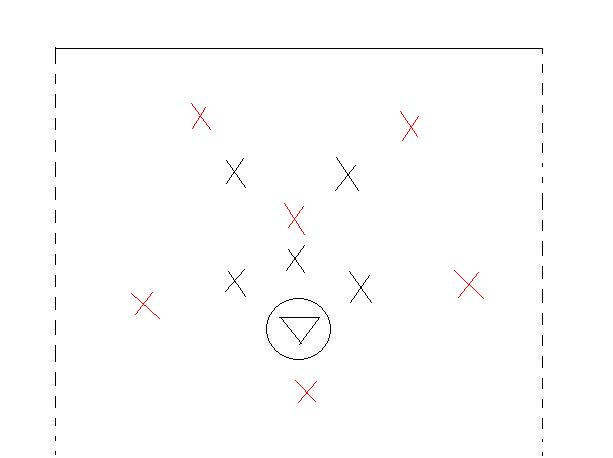
Box and 1 defense against 2-3-1 offense. Defense is black.

Man-up and Man-down, also known as power play, or extra man opportunity (EMO), refers to situations where one team is shorthanded as a result of a penalty. The offensive team attempts to take advantage of their extra player to score a goal, while the defensive team will try to stop them from scoring until they get back to even-handed.

Because they are a player short, the defense, called man down defense (MDD), must resort to a zone, and there are several zones they can choose from. One is known as the box-and-one defense, because one defenseman covers the man on the crease, while the other 4 players form a box. This defense is used against an offense with only one player on the crease. Another zone is the 2-3, which is almost exactly like the basketball defense of the same name, with three low zones and 2 higher zones.

The offense often chooses to run the same base offense as they run in settled situations, such as a 2-3-1, although offenses with two players on the crease, such as the 1-4-1, are less common. Another common offense that is run in man-up situations is the 3-2-1, also known as the "circle" offense, because no player is on the crease, and all of the players are on the perimeter in a circle. Lastly, there is the 3-3 offense, which has no player at X, and 3 midfielders across the top. One drawback to the 3-3 is that, on a shot, there is no attackman at X to back the shot up if it misses the goal.

A common offensive tactic in man-up situations is the use of the carry, whereby an offensive player carries the ball from one perimeter position to another. This can be disorienting for a defense, because they must "pass off" the player to another zone, or else the whole defense must rotate. Often, after a carry, a player may pass back to the position he came from, because there may be a hole there. The offense will also try to draw a defensive player out to them, with the threat of a shot, and make a quick pass in an attempt to get an open shot.

Defensive strategy centers around staying close to the goal, and not allowing shots from close range. As a result of being a man down, the defense must be less aggressive against long-range shooters, so they may allow long range shots that have a low percentage of scoring. This is similar to allowing a player to shoot a 3-pointer in a basketball fast break: the shot is lower percentage than a close shot, so the defense allows it rather than overplaying the shooter and allowing a layup. Defensive players must also be careful not to be stretched from their zone, by going too high or too far outside, and allow another player to sneak in at the other end of their zone.

== Substitutions ==
In lacrosse, substitution can occur in a variety of ways.

The primary method for substituting players is through the special substitution box, an area located between the two team benches that allows for on-the-fly substitutions. All on-the-fly substitutions must be through this "box."

Substitutions can also be made when the ball goes out on either sideline. In this case, if the coach desires to substitute players, he can ask for a horn to signify this "regular substitution". Play is delayed until the team(s) substituting have the players they want on the field. "Regular substitution" can also occur after goals are scored and penalties are reported to the scorer's table. These do not need a horn request. However, since 2013, horns no longer exist in the NCAA rules. Since 2014, horns have also been removed from the National-Federation of High School State Associations rulebook. This means that a coach is no longer allowed to request a horn to make a substitution on a ball out-of-bounds on the sideline. Horns still exist at the youth level, however coaches at other levels have to adapt to playing lacrosse without horns. In addition, the substitution box has been expanded to 20 yards, to allow for increased on-the-fly substitution. The horn is only used for signalling issues at the table that require the officials' attention, such as a player illegally entering the field, and the ends of periods.

== See also ==
- Midfielder (lacrosse)
- Goaltender (field lacrosse)
