= Intercrosse =

Non-contact variant of lacrosse

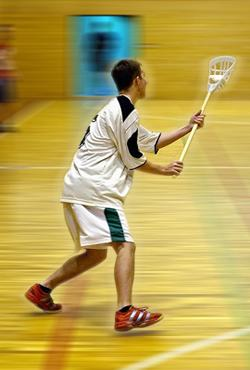
Intercrosse

Intercrosse (also called soft stick lacrosse, softcrosse, modcrosse, or pop lacrosse) is a non-contact form of lacrosse using modified lacrosse equipment. An intercrosse stick is different from a normal lacrosse stick: the head is completely plastic while the head of a traditional stick has a pocket of synthetic mesh or leather and nylon string. The ball is larger, softer, and hollow, unlike a lacrosse ball, which is solid rubber.

Intercrosse as a competitive adult sport is popular in many continental European countries, particularly in the Czech Republic, as well as in Quebec, Canada. Generally teams consist of five players per side, and the field size is 20 m wide and 40 m long. Goals are the same size as box lacrosse, 4 feet in height and width (1.2 x 1.2 m). As there is no contact allowed in the game, a player is not allowed to carry the ball for more than 5 seconds. Once it has obtained the ball a team must shoot on the goal within 30 seconds or lose possession.

The international governing body is the Fédération Internationale d'Inter-Crosse (FIIC), it was formed in Paris in 1985. The FIIC hosts three international intercrosse competitions. The World Games was the first to be created in 1987. The World Games are an annual event where players from different countries come to compete and celebrate the sport of intercrosse. Players are divided randomly into mixed-gender teams to provide a focus on fair play and community. The World Championship started in 1999 and has been held bi-annually since 2006. The World Championship is for national teams and is meant to develop the sport at the elite level. Started in 2010, the European Cup is given to the club team earning the most points accumulated each year in approved tournaments across Europe.

Soft stick lacrosse is also a popular way to introduce youth to lacrosse. It can be played outdoors or indoors and has a developed curriculum for physical education classes. Generally, the goals are small, semi-circular, portable nets and there is no goalie. Since 1992, a National Pop Lacrosse Championships has been held in the UK for primary school children. The title was won by Strathblane Primary School in 2019.

1990 Milan ( Arese) FIIC World Games: The teams were mixed genders for most. A College Laval grade 8 boy was selected and sent as team Canada. The sport was played with goalies wearing a similar outfit as hockey goalies without the big pads. Having goalie positions on the field would be the big difference with pop lacrosse. Canada Team was led by André Barrette, Michel Savoie and Jocelyn Beauvillier. Canada and Czechoslovakia faced each other in the finals and Canada won the unofficial title. The games were held at the same time as the 1990 FIFA World Cup.
