= Kostelec nad Černými lesy =

- Town
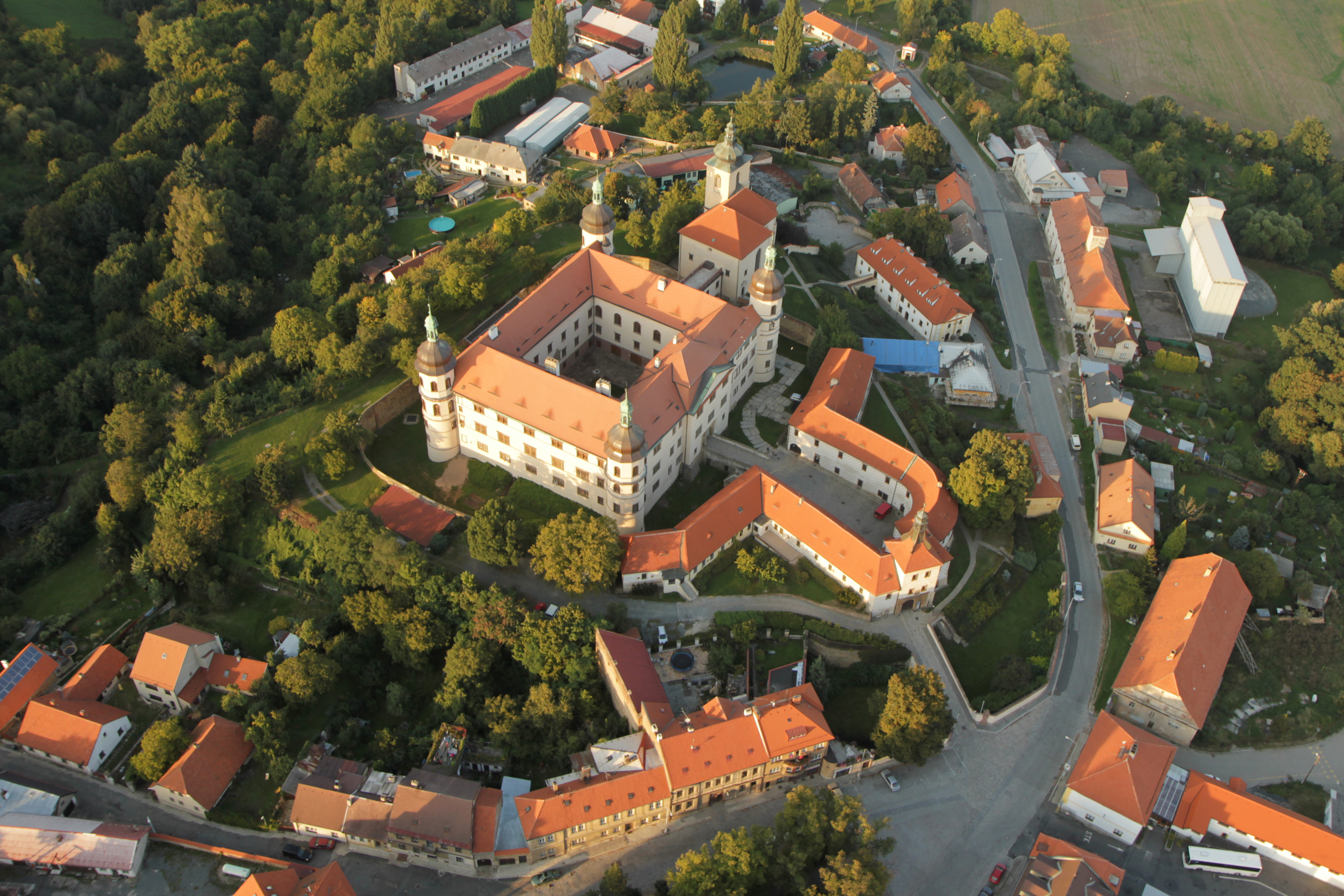
- Aerial view of the castle in the town

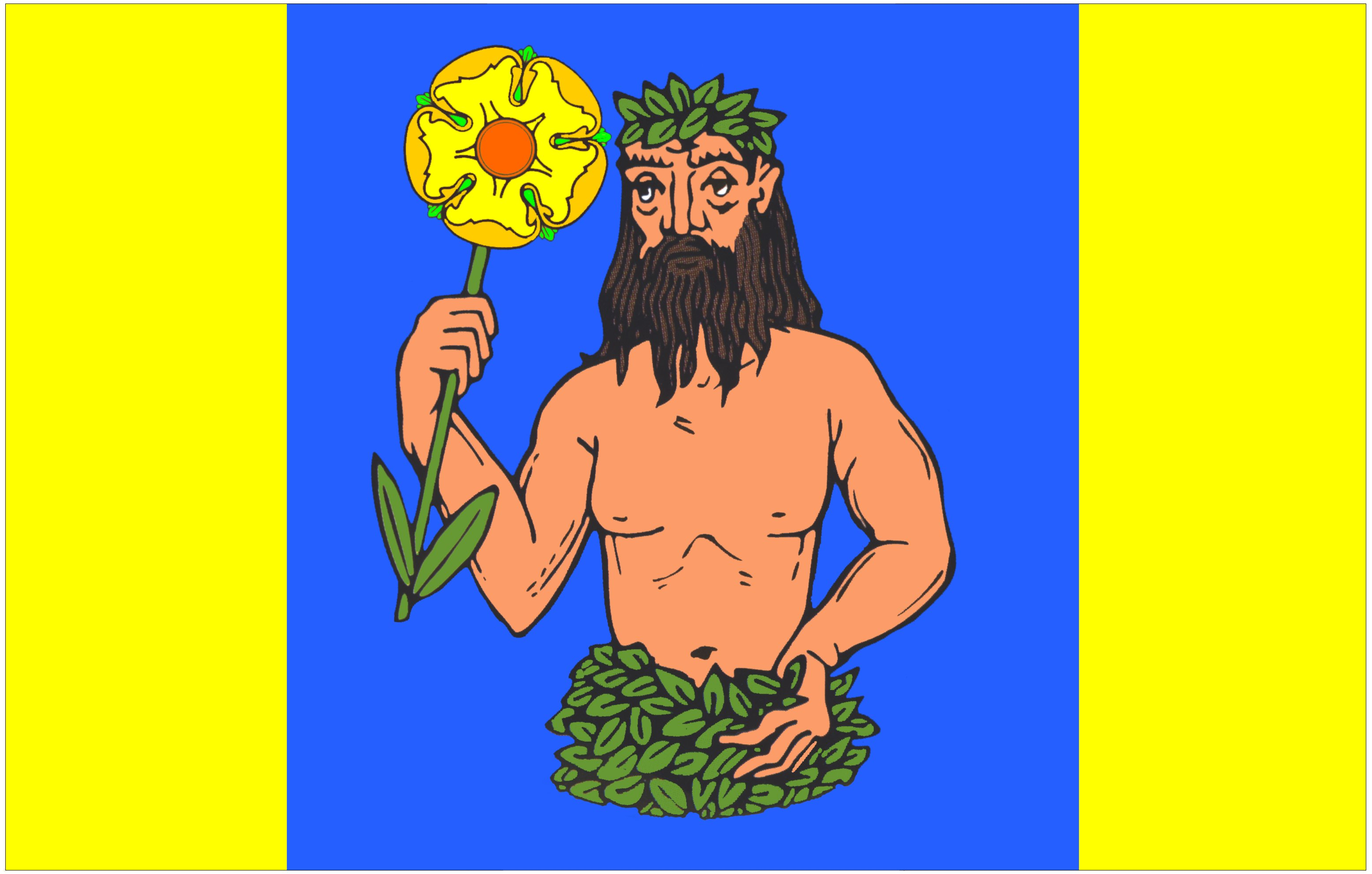
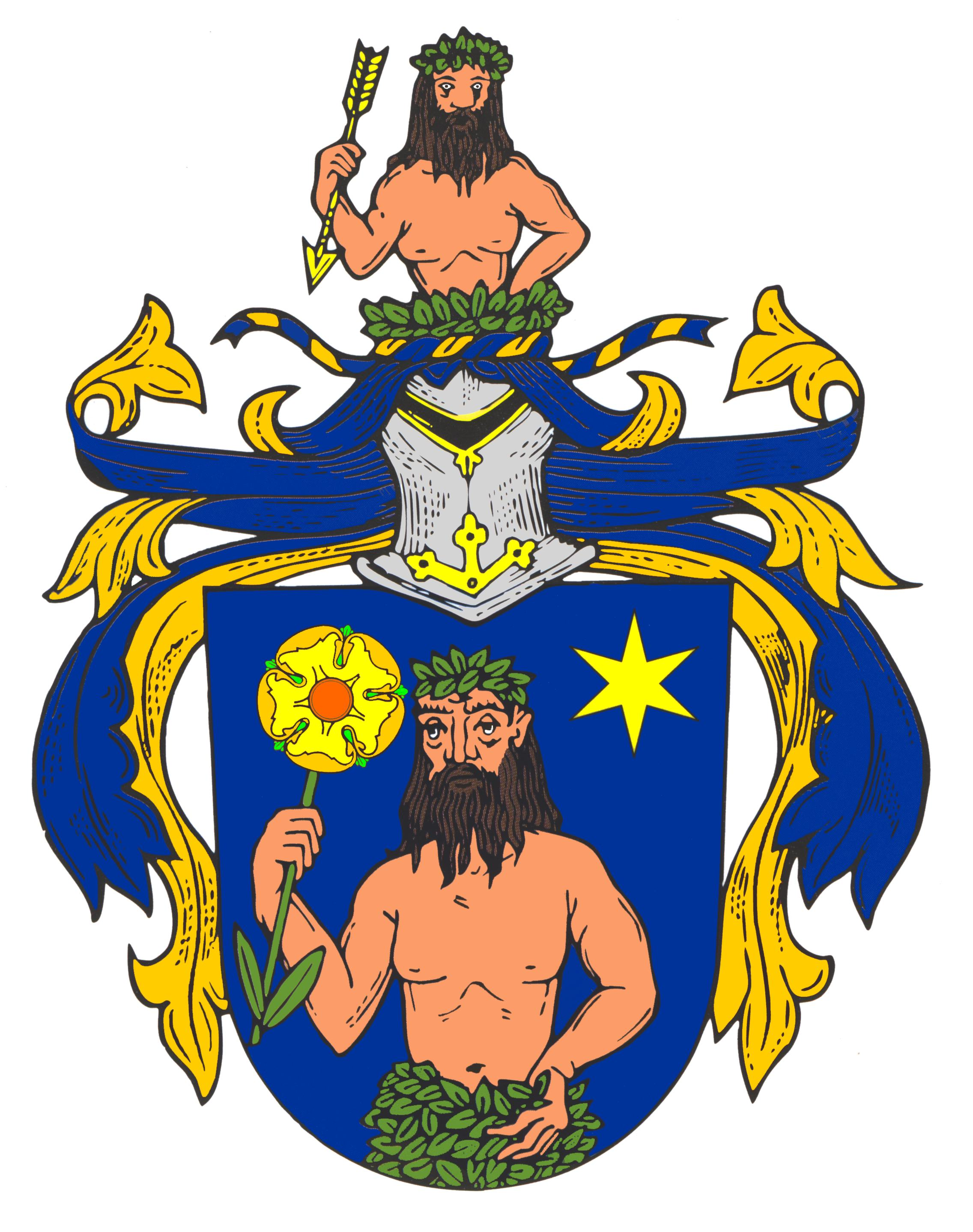
- Flag Coat of arms

- Location in the Czech Republic
- Coordinates: 49°59′39″N 14°51′20″E
- Country: Czech Republic
- Region: Central Bohemian
- District: Prague-East
- First mentioned: 1344

Government
  - Mayor: Jan Černý

Area
  - Total: 17.70 km^{2} (6.83 sq mi)
- Elevation: 391 m (1,283 ft)

Population (2026-01-01)
  - Total: 4,360
  - Density: 246/km^{2} (638/sq mi)
- Time zone: UTC+1 (CET)
  - Summer (DST): UTC+2 (CEST)
- Postal code: 281 63
- Website: www.kostelecncl.cz

Kostelec nad Černými lesy (Czech pronunciation: [ˈkostɛlɛts ˈnat tʃɛrniːmɪ ˈlɛsɪ]; German: Schwarzkosteletz) is a town in Prague-East District in the Central Bohemian Region of the Czech Republic. It has about 4,400 inhabitants. The town is located in the Benešov Uplands.

The historic town centre is well preserved and is protected as an urban monument zone. The main landmark of the town is the Kostelec nad Černými lesy Castle.

== Administrative division ==
Kostelec nad Černými lesy consists of two municipal parts (in brackets population according to the 2021 census):

- Kostelec nad Černými lesy (3,614)
- Svatbín (220)

== Etymology ==
The name refers to a fortified church (in Czech kostelec), which was built in a deep (black) forest on the Prague–Kouřim route. The name Kostelec soon evolved to Černý Kostelec ('black Kostelec') and in 1920 the name was changed to its current form, meaning "Kostelec upon the black forests".

== Geography ==
Kostelec nad Černými lesy is located about 24 kilometres (15 mi) east of Prague. It lies in the Benešov Uplands. The highest point is at 429 m (1,407 ft) above sea level.

== History ==
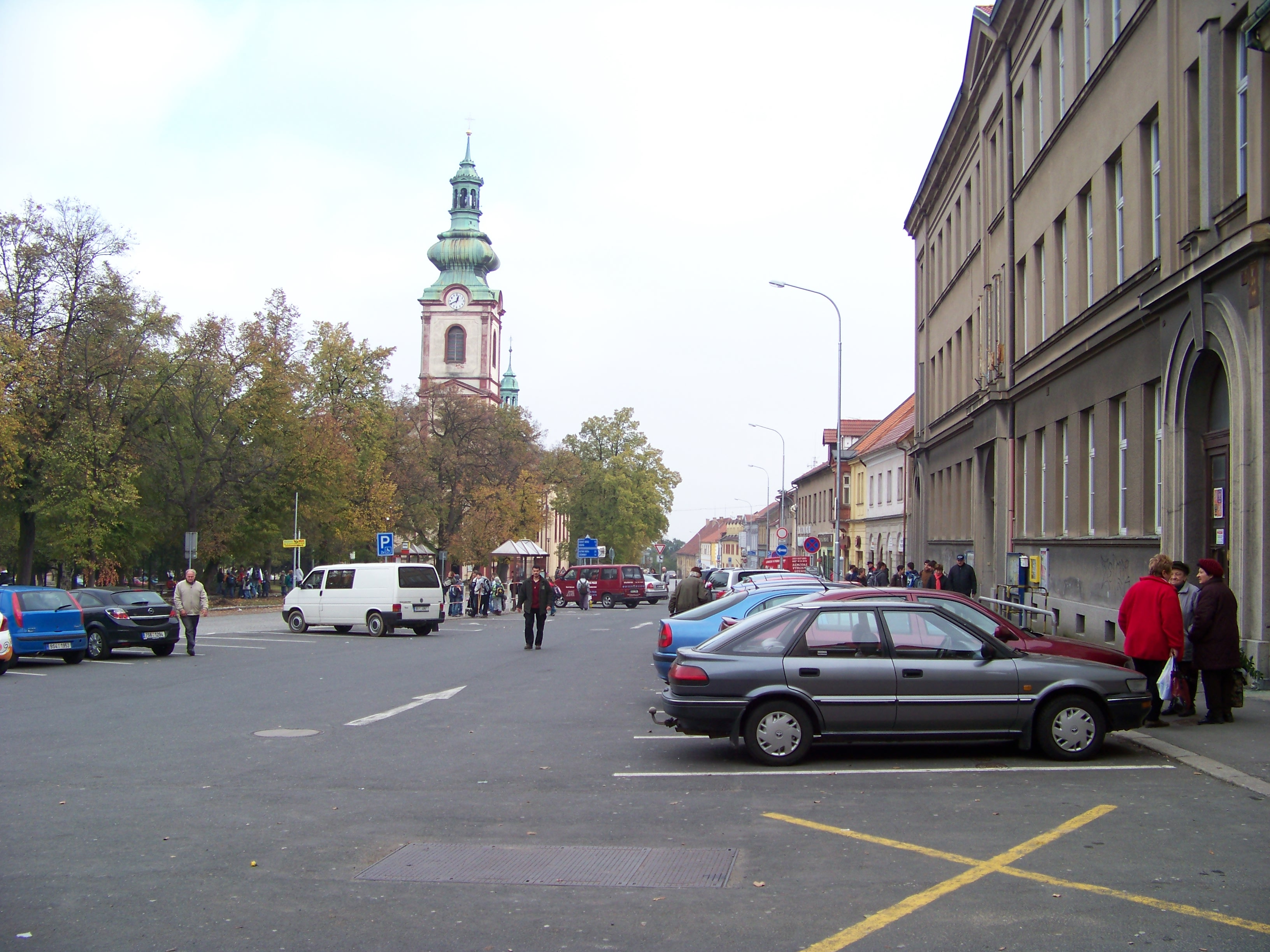
Smiřických Square (Náměstí Smiřických)

The first written mention of Kostelec is from 1344, when King John of Bohemia exchanged the castle and settlement of Kostelec for Náchod. During the rule of Lords of Smržov between 1415 and 1492, Kostelec developed, which culminated in 1489, when it was promoted to a market town. The greatest prosperity occurred during the rule of the Slavata of Chlum and Košumberk family (1492–1547).

From 1558, Kostelec was property of the Smiřický family, who finished reconstruction of the castle and made the Kostelec estate one of the largest in the region. Last member of the Smiřický family died in 1618. In 1621, after the Battle of White Mountain, Albrecht von Wallenstein acquired the estate, but after two years he sold it to Karl I of Liechtenstein.

The Liechtenstein family owned Kostelec until the establishment of self-government in 1850. The most important for the town was Princess Maria Theresia of Liechtenstein, who ruled the town from 1712 to 1772. During her rule, the town experienced an economic boom and gained the status of the cultural centre of the region. In the second half of the 18th century, Kostelec became known for its pottery workshops. After death of Maria Theresia, Kostelec ceased to be the seat of the Liechtensteins, but remained an economic centre. Forestry and fruit growing were developed.

== Demographics ==
Historical population

| Year | Pop. | ±% |
|---|---|---|
| 1869 | 3,451 | — |
| 1880 | 3,694 | +7.0% |
| 1890 | 3,696 | +0.1% |
| 1900 | 3,475 | −6.0% |
| 1910 | 3,377 | −2.8% |

| Year | Pop. | ±% |
|---|---|---|
| 1921 | 3,252 | −3.7% |
| 1930 | 3,379 | +3.9% |
| 1950 | 3,500 | +3.6% |
| 1961 | 3,386 | −3.3% |
| 1970 | 3,294 | −2.7% |

| Year | Pop. | ±% |
|---|---|---|
| 1980 | 3,230 | −1.9% |
| 1991 | 3,187 | −1.3% |
| 2001 | 3,245 | +1.8% |
| 2011 | 3,682 | +13.5% |
| 2021 | 3,834 | +4.1% |

Source: Censuses

== Transport ==
The I/2 road (the section from Prague to Kutná Hora) runs through the town.

== Sights ==
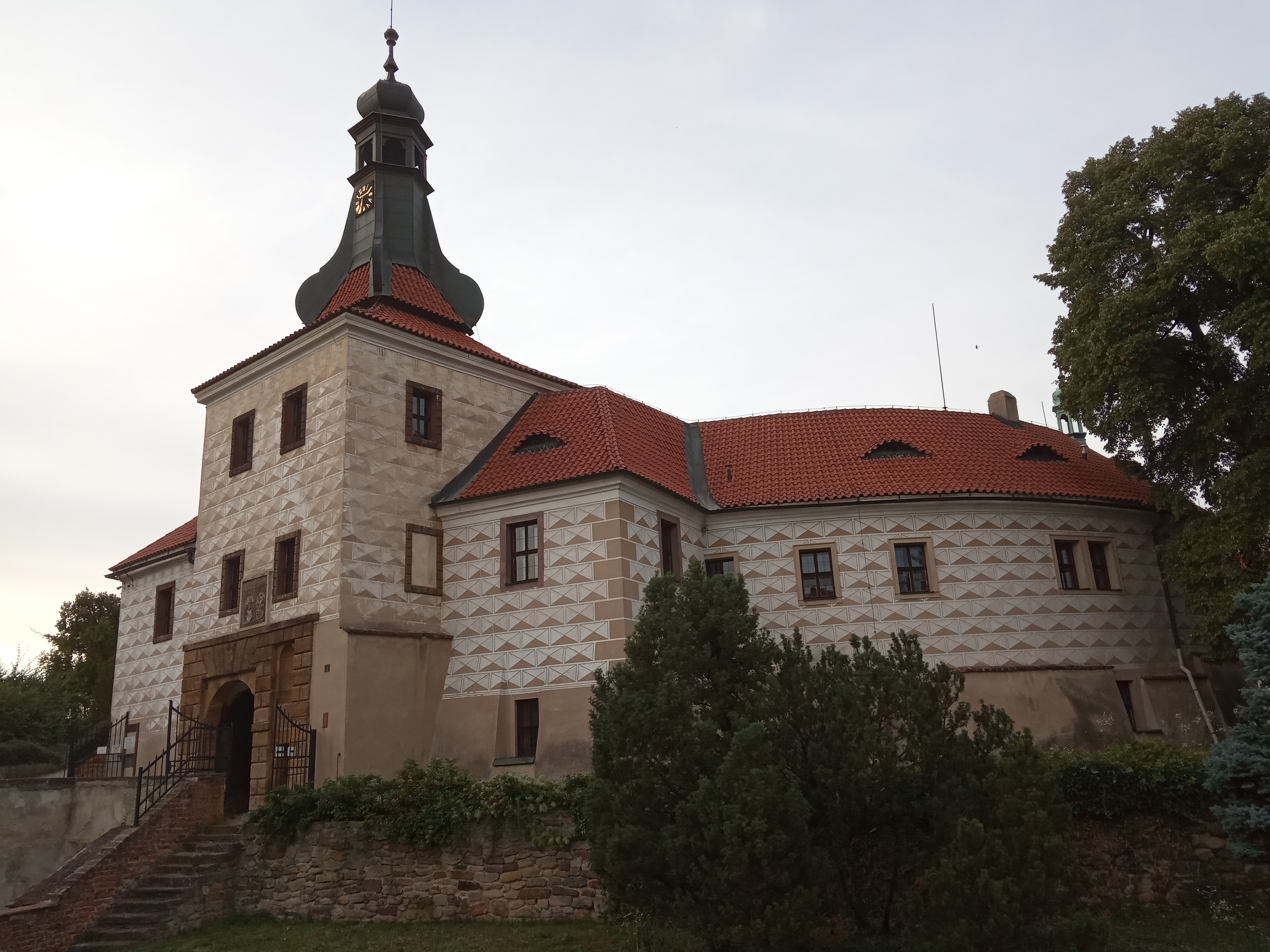
Kostelec nad Černými lesy Castle

The main landmark of the town is the Kostelec nad Černými lesy Castle. The castle was first documented in 1348. Until 1549, when it was destroyed by fire, the castle served as a hunting lodge of Emperor Ferdinand I. After 1550, it was rebuilt in the Renaissance style. After 1750, Baroque modifications were made. Today the castle is owned by Czech University of Life Sciences Prague and is used for social and business purposes. The neighbouring Church of Saint Adalbert is connected with the castle by a covered corridor.

The Church of the Holy Guardian Angels is located on the square Náměstí Smiřických in the historic centre. It is a Baroque church built in 1735–1737. In 1889–1894, a neo-Baroque prismatic tower was added.

Other sights on the square include Pottery Museum and Memorial to Jan Hus and Jan Žižka.

== Notable people ==
- Eva Švankmajerová (1940–2005), surrealist artist

== Twin towns – sister cities ==
Kostelec nad Černými lesy is twinned with:

- Mamirolle, France

== Gallery ==
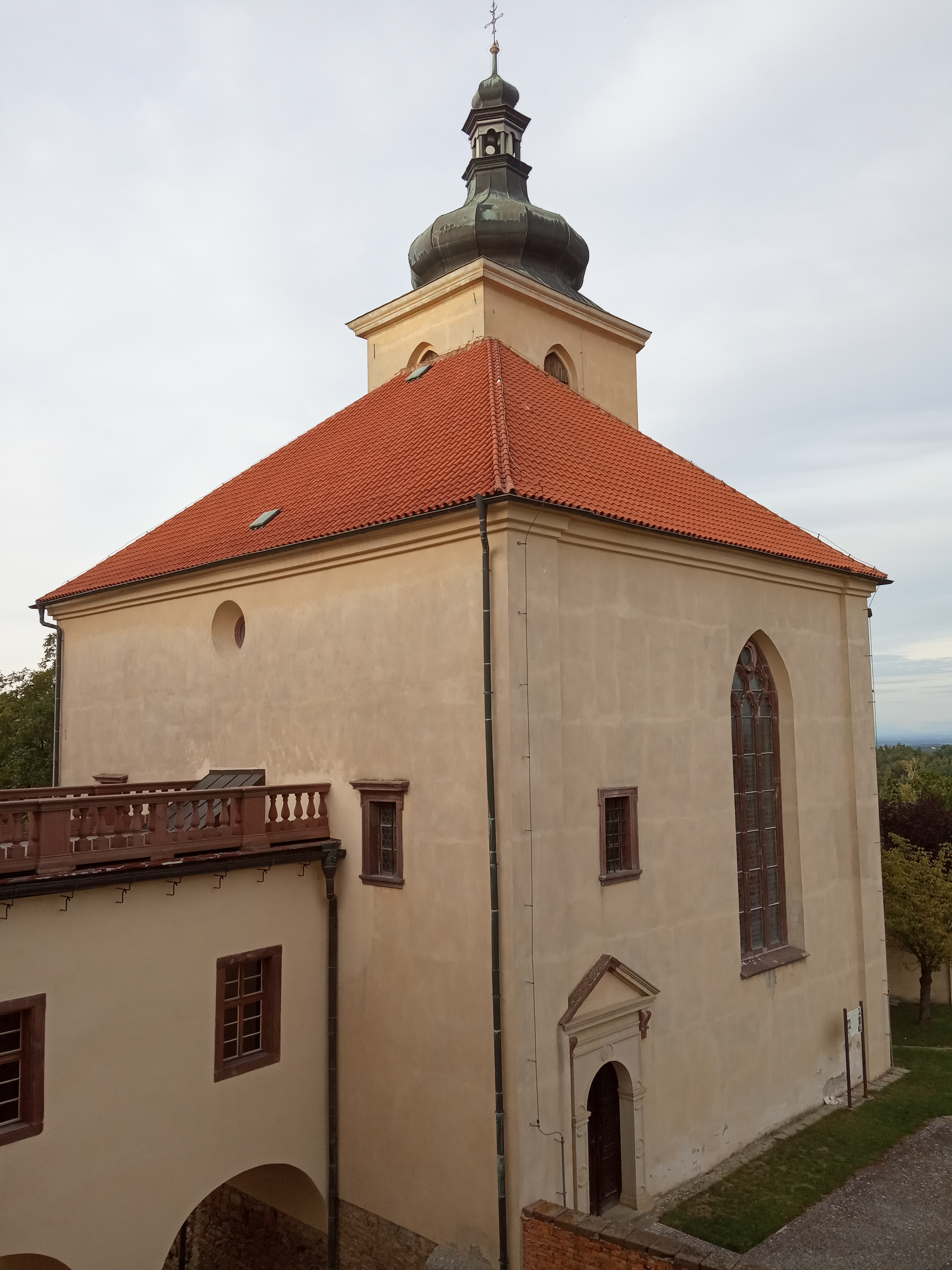
Church of Saint Adalbert

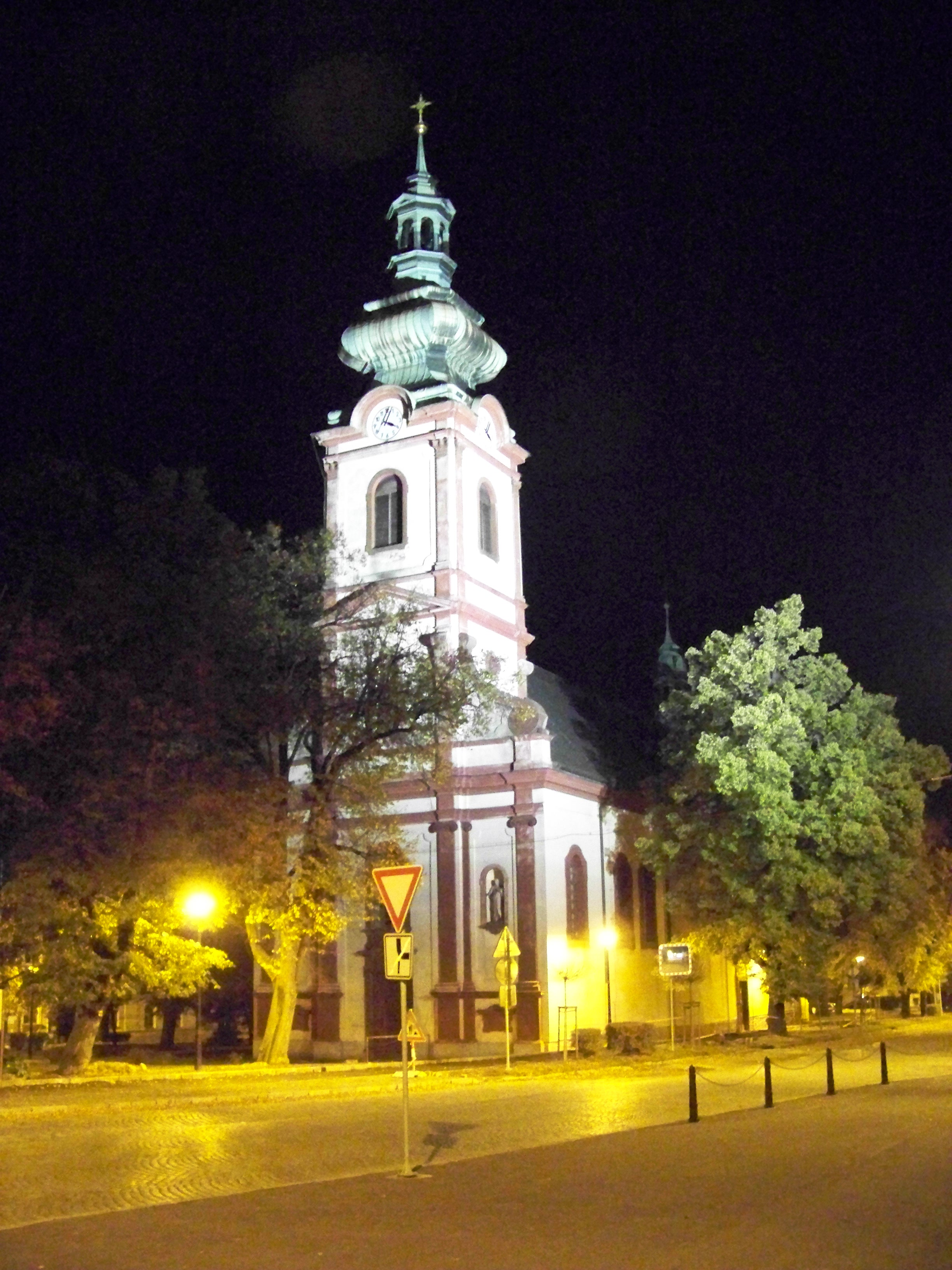
Church of the Holy Guardian Angels

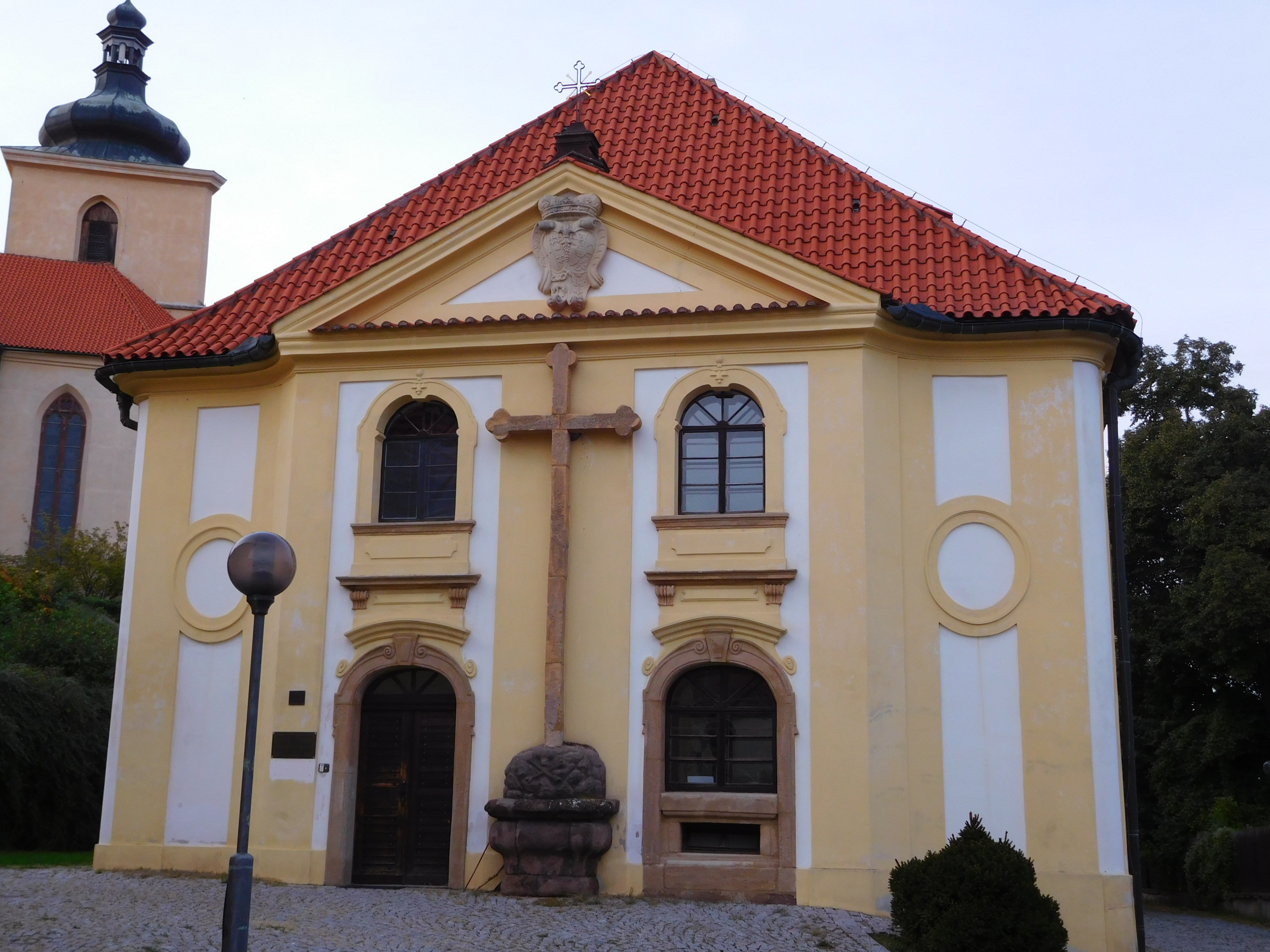
Baroque hospital

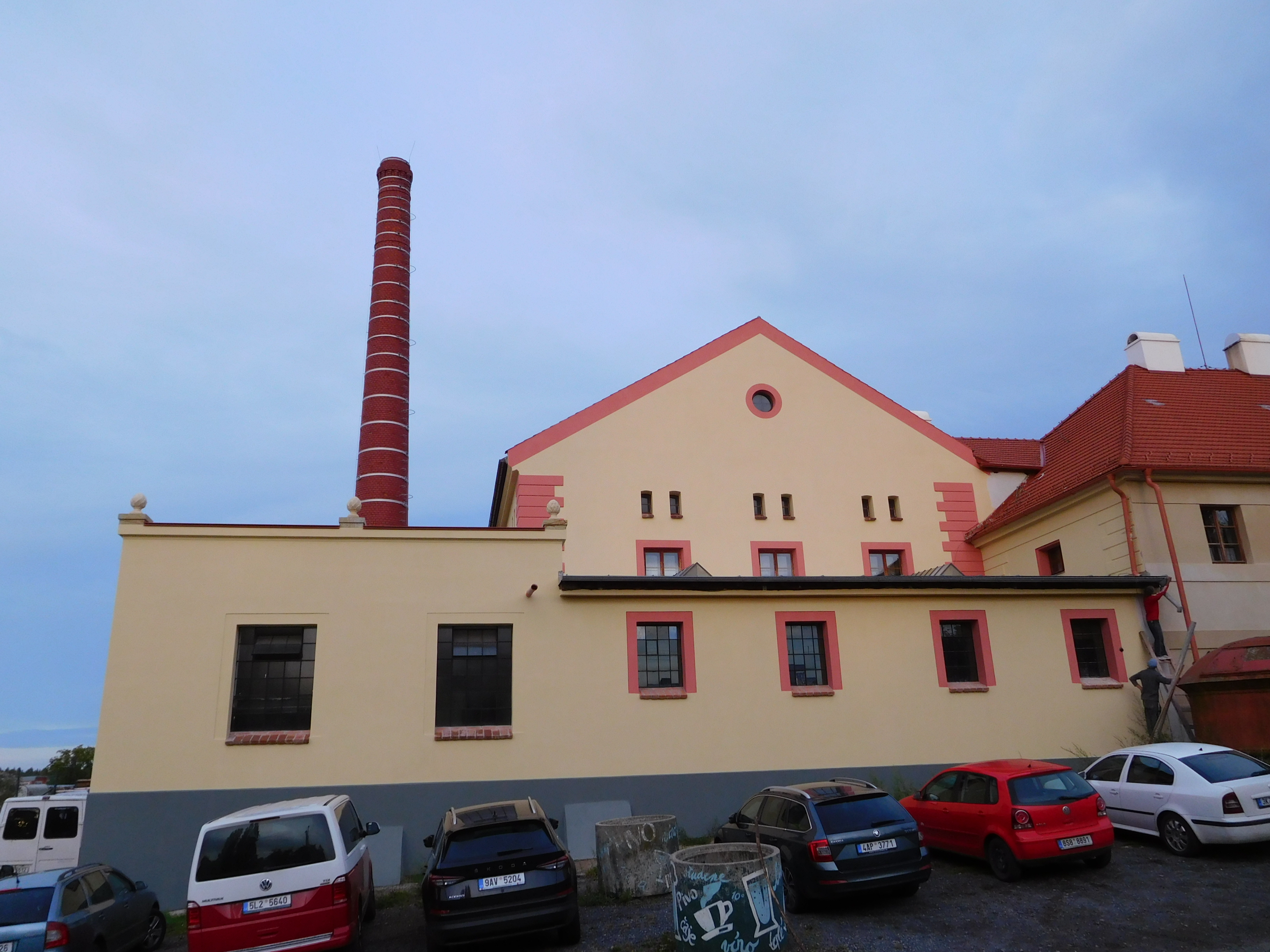
Brewery
