= Haudenosaunee women's national lacrosse team =

Women's national field lacrosse team representing the Haudenosaunee

Haudenosaunee Confederacy
- Nickname(s): Nationals
- WL membership: 2008
- Association: Haudenosaunee Nationals

Women's World Championship
- Appearances: 4 (first in 2009)
- Best result: Fourth place (2026)
- Website: haudenosauneenationals.com
Medal record
PALA Women's World Lacrosse Qualifier
Gold medal – first place	2019 United States
Bronze medal – third place	2025 United States

The Haudenosaunee women's national lacrosse team represents the Haudenosaunee Confederacy in international women's lacrosse competitions. They are currently ranked twelfth in the world by the World Lacrosse.

== History ==
In 1987, an all-Iroquois women's team was formed and planned to play an exhibition game in Syracuse, New York. The team lacking some backing from the elders was disbanded in 1988. Lacrosse has been traditionally viewed as a men's sports among the Iroquois.

A women's team was organized again at the 2005 Cup of Nations sports festival. The following year, a women's Iroquois team stood in front of the Six Nations Confederacy Council in Ontario asking for permission to field an international lacrosse team. The council approved the request with stipulations that the women's team cannot play under the name "Iroquois Nationals" which was used by the men's national team at the time and that a chief's representative would oversee the program. The Haudenosaunee women's team was established in 2006.

In 2008, the Iroquois Confederacy women's team, under the name Haudenosaunee, became a full member of the World Lacrosse.

In 2021, the Haudenosaunee Nationals organization was disbanded and the women's team was rebranded under the Iroquois Nationals organization. In June of 2022, the Nationals dropped Iroquois from their name, adopting the name the Haudenosaunee Nationals.

== Woman's Lacrosse World Cup ==
=== Overall results ===
World Lacrosse Championship
Year	Host	GP	W	L	GF	GA	Finish
2009	Czech Republic	6	4	2	83	34	11th
2013	Canada	9	6	3	137	65	7th
2017	England	8	5	3	101	79	12th
2022	United States	8	4	4	88	76	8th
Total	-	31	19	12	409	254	-

=== 2009 ===
19 June 2009 2009 Preliminary	Haudenosaunee	20–0	Austria	Prague (Czech Republic)
10:00 (UTC+02:00)		Report		Stadium: SK Slavia Praha

20 June 2009 2009 Preliminary	Haudenosaunee	16–2	Denmark	Prague (Czech Republic)
10:00 (UTC+02:00)		Report		Stadium: SK Slavia Praha

22 June 2009 2009 Round Two	Haudenosaunee	6–12	Ireland	Prague (Czech Republic)
10:30 (UTC+02:00)		Report		Stadium: SK Slavia Praha

24 June 2009 2009 9th–16th Place Quarterfinal	Haudenosaunee	16–2	Netherlands	Prague (Czech Republic)
18:15 (UTC+02:00)				Stadium: SK Slavia Praha

25 June 2009 2009 9th–12th Place Semifinal	Haudenosaunee	7–12	Czech Republic	Prague (Czech Republic)
15:30 (UTC+02:00)		Report		Stadium: SK Slavia Praha

26 June 2009 2009 11th Place Final	Haudenosaunee	18–6	New Zealand	Prague (Czech Republic)
12:30 (UTC+02:00)				Stadium: SK Slavia Praha

2009 Women's Lacrosse World Cup roster
Jersey	Name
20	Corinne Abrams
2	Cheri Abrams
13	Lindsay Doxtator
18	Ashley Hill
27	Joni Hill
21	Carla Jemison
6	Crystal Macdonald
31	Mia Mckie
19	Sandra Miller
22	Amber Pardee
32	Katrina Rabishaw
28	Katie Smith
23	Lindsey Steeprock
16	Awehiyo Thomas
3	Erralyn Thomas
8	Gawehegyeho Thomas
7	Jerrica Thomas-Hill
4	Naomi Walser

=== 2013 ===
11 July 2013 2013 Preliminary	Haudenosaunee	28–1	Sweden	Oshawa
		Report		Stadium: Oshawa Civic Auditorium

12 July 2013 2013 Preliminary	Haudenosaunee	25–0	Hong Kong	Oshawa
		Report		Stadium: Oshawa Civic Auditorium

13 July 2013 2013 Preliminary	Haudenosaunee	11–15	Japan	Oshawa
		Report		Stadium: Oshawa Civic Auditorium

14 July 2013 2013 Preliminary	Haudenosaunee	16–9	Germany	Oshawa
		Report		Stadium: Oshawa Civic Auditorium

16 July 2013 2013 Preliminary	Haudenosaunee	22–2	Austria	Oshawa
		Report		Stadium: Oshawa Civic Auditorium

17 July 2013 2013 Championship Round One	Haudenosaunee	19–3	Ireland	Oshawa
11:30 (UTC−04:00)		Report		Stadium: Oshawa Civic Auditorium

18 July 2013 2013 Championship Quarterfinal	Haudenosaunee	1–20	United States	Oshawa
12:30 (UTC−04:00)		Report		Stadium: Oshawa Civic Auditorium

19 July 2013 2013 Championship Semifinal	Haudenosaunee	14–15	Wales	Oshawa
12:30 (UTC−04:00)		Report		Stadium: Oshawa Civic Auditorium

20 July 2013 2013 7th Place Final	Haudenosaunee	1–0	Israel	Oshawa
		forfeit		Stadium: Oshawa Civic Auditorium

=== 2017 ===
13 July 2017 2017 Preliminary	Haudenosaunee	17–5	South Korea	Guildford (England)
17:00 (UTC+01:00)		Report		Stadium: Surrey Sports Park

14 July 2017 2017 Preliminary	Haudenosaunee	11–4	Hong Kong	Guildford (England)
14:30 (UTC+01:00)		Report		Stadium: Surrey Sports Park

15 July 2017 2017 Preliminary	Haudenosaunee	18-4	Switzerland	Guildford (England)
14:30 (UTC+01:00)		Report		Stadium: Surrey Sports Park

16 July 2017 2017 Preliminary	Haudenosaunee	11–10	Italy	Guildford (England)
13:30 (UTC+01:00)		Report		Stadium: Surrey Sports Park

18 July 2017 2017 Play-in	Haudenosaunee	2–9	New Zealand	Guildford (England)
12:00 (UTC+01:00)		Report		Stadium: Surrey Sports Park

19 July 2017 2017 Platinum Division Quarterfinal	Haudenosaunee	19–11	Netherlands	Guildford (England)
10:30 (UTC+01:00)		Report		Stadium: Surrey Sports Park

20 July 2017 2017 Platinum Division Semifinal	Haudenosaunee	6–18	Czech Republic	Guildford (England)
11:00 (UTC+01:00)		Report		Stadium: Surrey Sports Park

21 July 2017 2017 11th Place Final	Haudenosaunee	17–18	Italy	Guildford (England)
17:00 (UTC+01:00)		Report		Stadium: Surrey Sports Park

2017 Women's Lacrosse World Cup roster
Jersey	Name	Position	Height	Hometown/Nation
14	Wadataiwi Bomberry	Midfield	5'5"	Six Nations/Mohawk
23	Cheyenne Burnam	Midfield	5'6"	Onondaga/Mohawk
6	Vivian Curry	Midfield	5'9"	Cattaraugus/Seneca
22	Amber Hill-Donhauser	Goalie	5'8"	Tuscarora/Cayuga
20	Erin Francis	Attack	5'3"	Akwesasne/Mohawk
25	Jenna Haring	Goalie	5'3"	Cattaraugus/Seneca
2	Dana Issacs	Attack/Midfield	5'2"	Six Nations/Onondaga
24	Jalyn Jimerson	Midfield	5'9"	Cattaraugus/Cayuga
17	Jacelyn Lazore	Midfield	5'9"	Akwesasne/Mohawk
19	Mirabella Lazore	Attack/Midfield	5'2"	Akwesasne/Mohawk
18	Kristen Sedar	Defense	5'5"	Cattaraugus/Seneca
11	Tia Schindler	Defense	5'9"	Six Nations/Cayuga
8	Katie Smith	Midfield/Defense	5'4"	Six Nations/Mohawk
4	Awehiyo Thomas	Attack	5'4"	Six Nations/Cayuga
21	Kyra Thompson	Attack	5'3"	Akwasasne/Mohawk
13	Vanna Thompson	Defense	5'2"	Akwasasne/Mohawk
7	Victoria Thompson	Midfield	5'4"	Akwasasne/Mohawk
	Ashley Pike	Head coach		
	Justin Demuth	Assistant Coach		
	Fernando Pineda	Athletic Trainer		

=== 2022 ===
30 June 2022 2022 Preliminary	Haudenosaunee	8-13	Japan	Towson, Maryland (United States)
14:00 (UTC-04:00)		Report		Stadium: Johnny Unitas Stadium

1 July 2022 2022 Preliminary	Haudenosaunee	9-6	China	Towson, Maryland (United States)
13:00 (UTC-04:00)		Report		Stadium: Lower Fields Complex

3 July 2022 2022 Preliminary	Haudenosaunee	20-5	Switzerland	Towson, Maryland (United States)
19:00 (UTC-04:00)		Report		Stadium: Lower Fields Complex

4 July 2022 2022 Preliminary	Haudenosaunee	20-2	Argentina	Towson, Maryland (United States)
18:00 (UTC-04:00)		Report		Stadium: Lower Fields Complex

5 July 2022 2022 Championship Bracket - 1st Round	Haudenosaunee	11-9	Scotland	Towson, Maryland (United States)
12:00 (UTC-04:00)		Report		Stadium: Lower Fields Complex

6 July 2022 2022 Championship Bracket - Quarterfinals	Haudenosaunee	3-17	Australia	Towson, Maryland (United States)
14:00 (UTC-04:00)		Report		Stadium: Johnny Unitas Stadium

8 July 2022 2022 Championship Bracket - Consolation	Haudenosaunee	6-12	Japan	Towson, Maryland (United States)
11:00 (UTC-04:00)		Report		Stadium: Johnny Unitas Stadium

9 July 2022 2022 7th Place	Haudenosaunee	11-12	Czech Republic	Towson, Maryland (United States)
09:00 (UTC-04:00)		Report		Stadium: Lower Fields Complex

2022 Women's Lacrosse World Cup roster
Jersey	Name	Position
1	Ivy Santana	Attack
2	Miya Scanlan	Attack
3	Taylor Frink	Attack
4	Jalyn Jimerson	Midfield
5	Lynnzee Miller	Attack
9	Lottie Gill	Defense
10	Tiana Bomberry	Defense
12	Wynter Jock	Midfield
14	Beretta Santana	Defense
16	Cassandra Minerd	Defense
17	Timmia Bomberry	Midfield
18	Lois Garlow	Midfield
19	Jacelyn Lazore	Midfield
21	Paisley Cook	Midfield
22	Paige Crandall	Goalie
24	Fawn Porter	Midfield
27	Fantasy Jimerson-Kenjockety	Goalie
33	Allyson Trice	Defense

== World Games ==
=== Overall results ===
World Games
Year	Host	GP	W	L	GF	GA	Finish
2022	United States	4	1	3	40	55	7th
Total		4	1	3	40	55	-

=== 2022 ===
12 July 2022 2022 Preliminary	Haudenosaunee	10-17	Israel	Birmingham, Alabama
12:00 (UTC-05:00)		Report		Stadium: PNC Field

13 July 2022 2022 Preliminary	Haudenosaunee	10-11	Great Britain	Birmingham, Alabama
10:30 (UTC-05:00)		Report		Stadium: PNC Field

14 July 2022 2022 Preliminary	Haudenosaunee	7-19	Canada	Birmingham, Alabama
14:45 (UTC-05:00)		Report		Stadium: PNC Field

15 July 2022 2022 7th Place	Haudenosaunee	13-8	Czech Republic	Birmingham, Alabama
10:30 (UTC-05:00)		Report		Stadium: PNC Field

2022 World Games roster
Number	Name
10	Tiana Bomberry
17	Timmia Bomberry
21	Paisley Cook
34	Jordan Coulon
22	Paige Crandall
18	Lois Garlow
4	Jalyn Jimerson
19	Jacelyn Lazore
16	Cassandra Minerd
24	Fawn Porter
1	Ivy Santana
2	Miya Scanlan
Head coach	Elizabeth Beville

== Other tournaments and games ==
=== 1980s ===
1984 Tournament	Iroquois (Haudenosaunee)	-	Quebec

1984 Tournament	Iroquois (Haudenosaunee)	-	British Columbia

1984 Tournament	Iroquois (Haudenosaunee)	-	Ontario

1984 Tournament	Iroquois (Haudenosaunee)	-	Saskatchewan

1984 Tournament	Iroquois (Haudenosaunee)	-	United States

=== 2000s ===
8 February 2009 South of the Border Tournament	Haudenosaunee	5–10	Villanova Wildcats	Chapel Hill, North Carolina
				Stadium: Finley Fields

23 May 2009 Women's Division National Tournament	Haudenosaunee	0–20	United States	Bel Air, Harford County, Maryland
				Stadium: Cedar Lane Sports Park

=== 2010s ===
13 July 2012 2012 North American Challenge Cup	Haudenosaunee	0–20	United States	Oshawa
16:00 (UTC−04:00)				Stadium: Oshawa Civic Auditorium

14 July 2012 2012 North American Challenge Cup	Haudenosaunee	8–11	Canada	Oshawa
				Stadium: Oshawa Civic Auditorium

24 January 2013 Friendly	Haudenosaunee	14–15	Florida Southern Moccasins	Lakeland, Florida
				Stadium: Barnett Field

25 January 2013 2013 Champions Challenge	Haudenosaunee	2–18	England	Bay Lake, Florida
				Stadium: ESPN Wide World of Sports Complex

26 January 2013 2013 Champions Challenge	Haudenosaunee	12–21	Rollins Tars	Bay Lake, Florida
11:00 (UTC−05:00)				Stadium: ESPN Wide World of Sports Complex

26 January 2013 2013 Champions Challenge	Haudenosaunee	19–10	Stetson Hatters	Bay Lake, Florida
19:00 (UTC−05:00)				Stadium: ESPN Wide World of Sports Complex

15 April 2017 Friendly	Haudenosaunee	11–4	ULAX New York	New York City
21:00 (UTC−04:00)				Stadium: Randalls Island

16 April 2017 Friendly	Haudenosaunee	10–17	Israel	Hicksville, New York
10:00 (UTC−04:00)				Stadium: Cantiague Park

14 November 2019 2019 PALA World Cup Qualifiers	Haudenosaunee	17-3	Colombia	Auburndale, Florida
18:00 (UTC−05:00)				Stadium: Lake Myrtle Sports Complex

15 November 2019 2019 PALA World Cup Qualifiers	Haudenosaunee	21-3	Jamaica	Auburndale, Florida
11:00 (UTC−05:00)				Stadium: Lake Myrtle Sports Complex

16 November 2019 2019 PALA World Cup Qualifiers Semifinal	Haudenosaunee	14-4	Mexico	Auburndale, Florida
14:00 (UTC−05:00)				Stadium: Lake Myrtle Sports Complex

17 November 2019 2019 PALA World Cup Qualifiers Final	Haudenosaunee	16-6	Puerto Rico	Auburndale, Florida
11:30 (UTC−05:00)				Stadium: Lake Myrtle Sports Complex

2019 PALA World Cup Qualifiers roster
Jersey	Name	Nation/Location
2	Dana Issacs	Onondaga, Six Nations
3	Taylor Frink	Onondaga, Baldwinsville
4	Awehiyo Thomas	Cayuga, Six Nations
6	Tsiotenharilo Herne	Mohawk, Akwesasne
7	Enahaogwahs Schindler	Cayuga, Six Nations
8	Katie Smith	Mohawk, Six Nations
9	Tristyn Miller	Oneida, Six Nations
11	Kimberly Gibson	Cayuga, Six Nations
14	Wadatawi Bomberry	Mohawk, Six Nations
18	Lois Garlow	Seneca, Cattaraugus
19	Jacelyn Lazore	Mohawk, Akwesasne
23	Mirabella Lazore	Mohawk, Akwesasne
24	Jalyn Jimmerson	Cayuga, Cattaraugus
25	Fantasy Jimmerson	Seneca, Cattaraugus
27	Victoria Thompson	Mohawk, Akwesasne
28	Awehiyo Thomas	Cayuga, Six Nations
29	Amber Hill	Cayuga, Tuscarora
Head coach	Katie Rowan	
Assistant Head Coach	Leah Gallaagher	

26 June 2025 2025 PALA Woman's Qualifier Pool Play	Haudenosaunee	8-14	Canada	Auburndale, Florida
11:00 (UTC−04:00)		Report		Stadium: Lake Myrtle Sports Complex

27 June 2025 2025 PALA Woman's Qualifier Pool Play	Haudenosaunee	18-9	Argentina	Auburndale, Florida
10:00 (UTC−04:00)		Report		Stadium: Lake Myrtle Sports Complex

28 June 2025 2025 PALA Woman's Qualifier Pool Play	Haudenosaunee	15-6	Jamaica	Auburndale, Florida
12:30 (UTC−04:00)		Report		Stadium: Lake Myrtle Sports Complex

29 June 2025 2025 PALA Woman's Qualifier Semifinal	Haudenosaunee	8-18	United States	Auburndale, Florida
10:00 (UTC−04:00)		Report		Stadium: Lake Myrtle Sports Complex

30 June 2025 2025 PALA Woman's Qualifier Bronze Medal	Haudenosaunee	12-10	Puerto Rico	Auburndale, Florida
10:00 (UTC−04:00)		Report		Stadium: Lake Myrtle Sports Complex

2025 PALA roster
Name	Position
Alie Jimerson	Attack
Jayln Jimerson	Attack
Lois Garlow	Attack
Avery Doran	Attack
Wynter Jock	Attack
Mia Mitchell	Attack
Tallis Tarbell	Attack
Sierra Cockerille	Midfield
Jordan Coulon	Midfield
Chloe Luther	Midfield
Paisley Cook	Midfield
Ava Tallchief	Midfield
Jacelyn Lazore	Midfield
Addison Jimerson	Midfield
Laelle Jimerson	Midfield
Ally Trice	Defense
Bean Minerd	Defense
Fawn Porter	Defense
Lottie Gill	Defense
Kimaura Schindler	Defense
Paige Crandall	Goalie
Kimora Swamp	Goalie
Taylor Fink	Head coach
Liz Beville	Assistant Coach
Leah Gallagher	Assistant Coach
Brittany Dipper	Assistant Coach
Kevin Phengthavone	Strength and Conditioning Coach
Jacob Habermehl	Athletic Trainer
Marissa Haring	Team Operations
Shaniece Mohawk	Team Operations
Claudia Jimerson	Director of Women's Lacrosse
