= Bonnie Rosen =

American lacrosse player and lacrosse coach

Personal information
- Nationality: USA
- Born: Bala Cynwyd, Pennsylvania, U.S.

Sport
- Position: Defender
- NCAA team: Virginia Cavaliers

Bonnie Rosen is an American former college lacrosse player and lacrosse coach. Rosen was an All-American and national champion in 1991 while playing for the Virginia Cavaliers women's lacrosse team. She is currently the head coach of the Temple Owls women's lacrosse team, a position she has held since 2007.

== High school career ==
Rosen is a 1988 graduate of Harriton High School.

== College career ==
Rosen played both field hockey and lacrosse at the University of Virginia. She helped lead the Virginia Cavaliers women's lacrosse team to the 1991 national championship. She was an All-American at Virginia.

== Coaching career ==
In 1995, Rosen began her college coaching career as an assistant coach for the Yale Bulldogs women's lacrosse team. In 1997, Rosen was named as the first head coach of the University of Connecticut women's lacrosse team. Rosen became the head coach of the Temple Owls women's lacrosse team in 2007.

== National team career ==
Rosen has been a member of several United States women's national lacrosse team selections for the women's lacrosse world cup. She was selected for the 2005 International Federation of Women's Lacrosse Associations World Cup and was a starting defender on 1997 women's lacrosse world cup and 2001 women's lacrosse world cup championship teams as a member of Team USA.

== Halls of fame ==
Rosen is a member of the Philadelphia Jewish Sports Hall of Fame, inducted in 2002. She was inducted in 2010 into the USA Lacrosse Hall of Fame. Rosen is also a 2000 inductee into the Harriton High School Hall of Fame.
