= Lacrosse at the World Games =

Lacrosse competition

Lacrosse is part of the World Games as an official sport (for women) since the 2017 edition and invitational sport (for men) since the 2022 edition.

== Men's tournament ==
Year	Host	Gold-medal match			Bronze-medal match		
Year	Host	Gold	Score	Silver	Bronze	Score	Fourth place
2022; Details	(United States); Birmingham	Canada	23–9	United States	Japan	19 – 18 (OT)	Great Britain

== Women's tournament ==
Year	Host	Gold-medal match			Bronze-medal match		
Year	Host	Gold	Score	Silver	Bronze	Score	Fourth place
2017; Details	(Poland); Wrocław	United States	11–8	Canada	Australia	10–8	Great Britain
2022; Details	(United States); Birmingham	Canada	14–12	United States	Australia	13–7	Great Britain
2025; Details	(China); Chengdu	United States	16–8	Canada	Australia	13–12	Japan

== Performance by tournament ==
=== Men ===
Team	Appearances	2022 (United States) (8)
Australia	1	6th
Canada	1	1st
Germany	1	7th
Great Britain	1	4th
Haudenosaunee	1	5th
Israel	1	8th
Japan	1	3rd
United States	1	2nd

=== Women ===
Team	Appearances	2017 (Poland) (6)	2022 (United States) (8)	2025 (China) (8)
Australia	3	3rd	3rd	3rd
Canada	3	2nd	1st	2nd
China	1	–	–	8th
Czech Republic	2	–	8th	6th
Great Britain	3	4th	4th	5th
Haudenosaunee	1	–	7th	–
Ireland	1	–	–	7th
Israel	1	–	5th	–
Japan	3	5th	6th	4th
Poland	1	6th	–	–
United States	3	1st	2nd	1st

== Medal table ==
Rank	Nation	Gold	Silver	Bronze	Total
1	Canada (CAN)	2	2	0	4
1	United States (USA)	2	2	0	4
3	Australia (AUS)	0	0	3	3
4	Japan (JPN)	0	0	1	1
Totals (4 entries)		4	4	4	12

== See also ==
- Lacrosse at the Summer Olympics
- World Lacrosse Men's Championship
- World Lacrosse Women's Championship
