= Sport in South Australia =

Overview of sports in South Australia

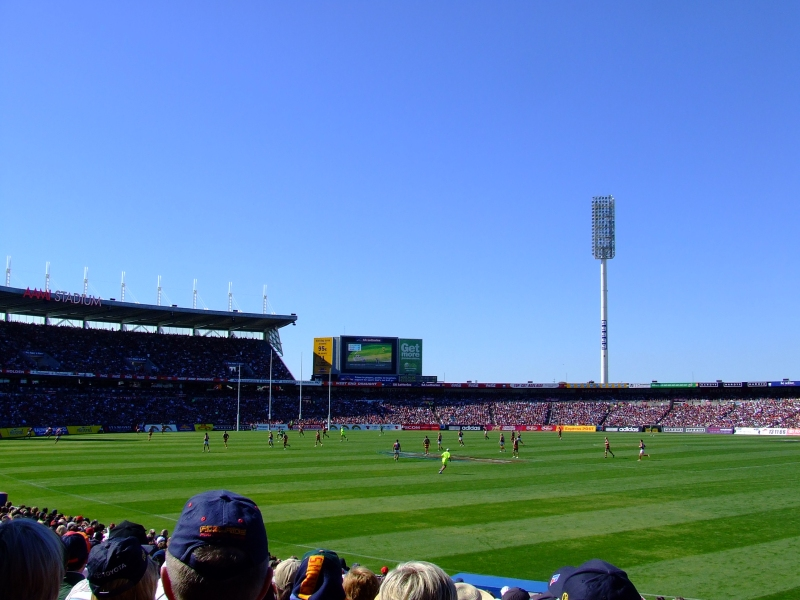
Australian rules football at the AAMI Stadium

Sport plays an important role in the business, community, social and cultural life in the state of South Australia.

Sport as entertainment plays an important role with South Australia, in 2007 having the second highest rate of event attendance of all states and territories with 49% of South Australians aged 15 years and over attending a sporting event each year.

Regional and rural opportunities to participate in sport plays an important role in community life throughout SA. SA has developed a range of programs in supporting inclusive sports pathways focusing on specific populations groups such as indigenous, mature-aged, early childhood, people with disabilities and women.

Significant elite sporting events in South Australia include the Tour Down Under, Clipsal 500, Adelaide Cup, International Cricket series and hosting various Australian Swimming Championships. Major events have been shown to bring significant economic benefit to the state.

South Australian-based teams are represented in almost all Australian major professional sporting codes including the Adelaide Football Club and Port Adelaide Football Club in the Australian Football League, the Redbacks, Scorpions and Adelaide Strikers in cricket, Adelaide United in the A-League and W-League, Adelaide 36ers in the National Basketball League, Adelaide Lightning in the Women's National Basketball League, and the Adelaide Thunderbirds in the Suncorp Super Netball for netball.

In 2005-06, the most popular spectator sports in South Australia by attendance were Australian Rules football (31%), motor sports (14%), horse racing (8%), cricket, (5%) and soccer (4%).

South Australia boasts many venues for high-performance sport, including the Adelaide Oval, Adelaide Super-Drome, Netball SA Stadium, and Hindmarsh Stadium.

All major sporting codes within South Australia field representative teams on the national stage. South Australia's official sporting colours are red, blue, and gold.

== Sport SA ==
The South Australian Sports Federation Incorporated, known as Sport SA, is the peak professional association for all South Australian sports. It was established in 1991.

Sport SA established the South Australian Sport Hall of Fame in 2009, and the inaugural inductees were announced on 15 September 2010.

== Participation ==
Research shows two thirds of South Australians are involved in sport or recreation with around forty percent of those involved, participating in organised sporting activities. Significantly people from regional areas are more likely to participate through a club based structure and are more likely to volunteer and to be a spectator than those in the Adelaide metropolitan area. It is estimated regional communities have an estimated one third of adults participating in exercise recreation and sport via a club or association and almost a quarter are involved as a coach, official, umpire or administrator.

Participation rates for males and females are similar and while overall, participation rates decline with age it was more so with males, while women's participation rates remain constant until they are over the age of 65.

Research shows walking, running, swimming, aerobics/fitness, golf, lawn bowls, weight training and cycling to be the most popular sports with strong participation by both men and women in South Australia. Historically not all sports have been available to women but that has changed with equal opportunity laws targeting discrimination based on gender.

Differences in participation rates by men and women relate to the football codes and netball, which have in the past been limited by opportunities for participation by genders not traditionally associated with the sport.

== High performance sport ==
South Australia has produced successful Olympians, Paralympians, Commonwealth Games representatives, world champions and national champions across a wide range of individual and team sports. The state has produced successful professional golfers including Jane Crafter and Tamie Durdin, world-class tennis players including Lleyton Hewitt, John Fitzgerald, Mark Woodforde, Darren Cahill, Roger Rasheed and Alicia Molik, and many other successful world champions including squash player Vicki Cardwell and Kylie Halliday in sport aerobics.

The establishment of the South Australian Sports Institute in 1982 played a role in supporting elite individuals and team sports. Currently it has high performance programs for rowing, Paralympic, netball, canoe sprint, swimming, cycling, trampoline, diving, volleyball, hockey and water polo and conducts talent search activities throughout the state. A new building for the institute is being constructed at Mile End, South Australia, with funding from the Government of South Australia.

== Major sports ==
=== Australian rules football ===
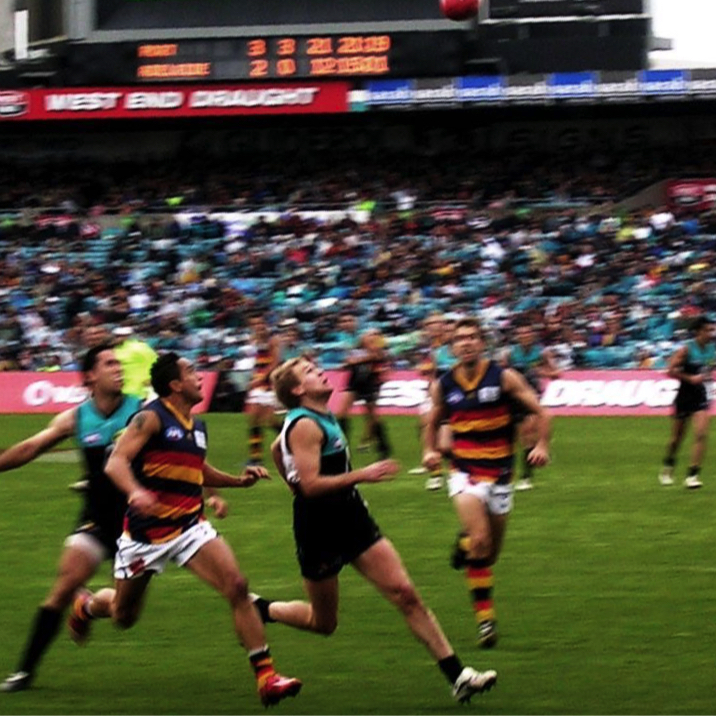
Andrew McLeod (left) and Kane Cornes (right) about to engage in a marking contest in a Showdown.

Australian rules football is the most popular spectator sport in South Australia with an attendance level (of at least one match per year) of 31% of the population, compared with a national average of 16%.

Two South Australian teams participate in the Australian Football League (AFL): the Adelaide Football Club (joined in 1991), known as the Crows, and the Port Adelaide Football Club (joined in 1997), nicknamed the Power. The match between these teams, called the Showdown, is the most-watched football match in South Australia. Both clubs also have a women's team in the AFL Women's league, with Adelaide joining for the inaugural season in 2017 and Port Adelaide joining for the seventh season in late 2022.

South Australia also has a ten-team competition called the South Australian National Football League (SANFL), which was established in 1877 and is the oldest statue league in the country, having formed one week earlier than the Victorian Football Association. Prior to the Adelaide Crows joining the AFL in 1991, the SANFL was the highest level of competition in the state. Both AFL teams have reserves teams which play in the SANFL. The SANFL also runs an eight-team women's competition called the SANFLW. Beyond the AFL and SANFL, the state also has 30 community leagues in both metro and regional areas. As of 2018, more than 200,000 South Australians play Australian rules football, including more than 50,000 registered players in club competitions, making Australian rules football the number one club participant sport in the state.

=== Cricket ===
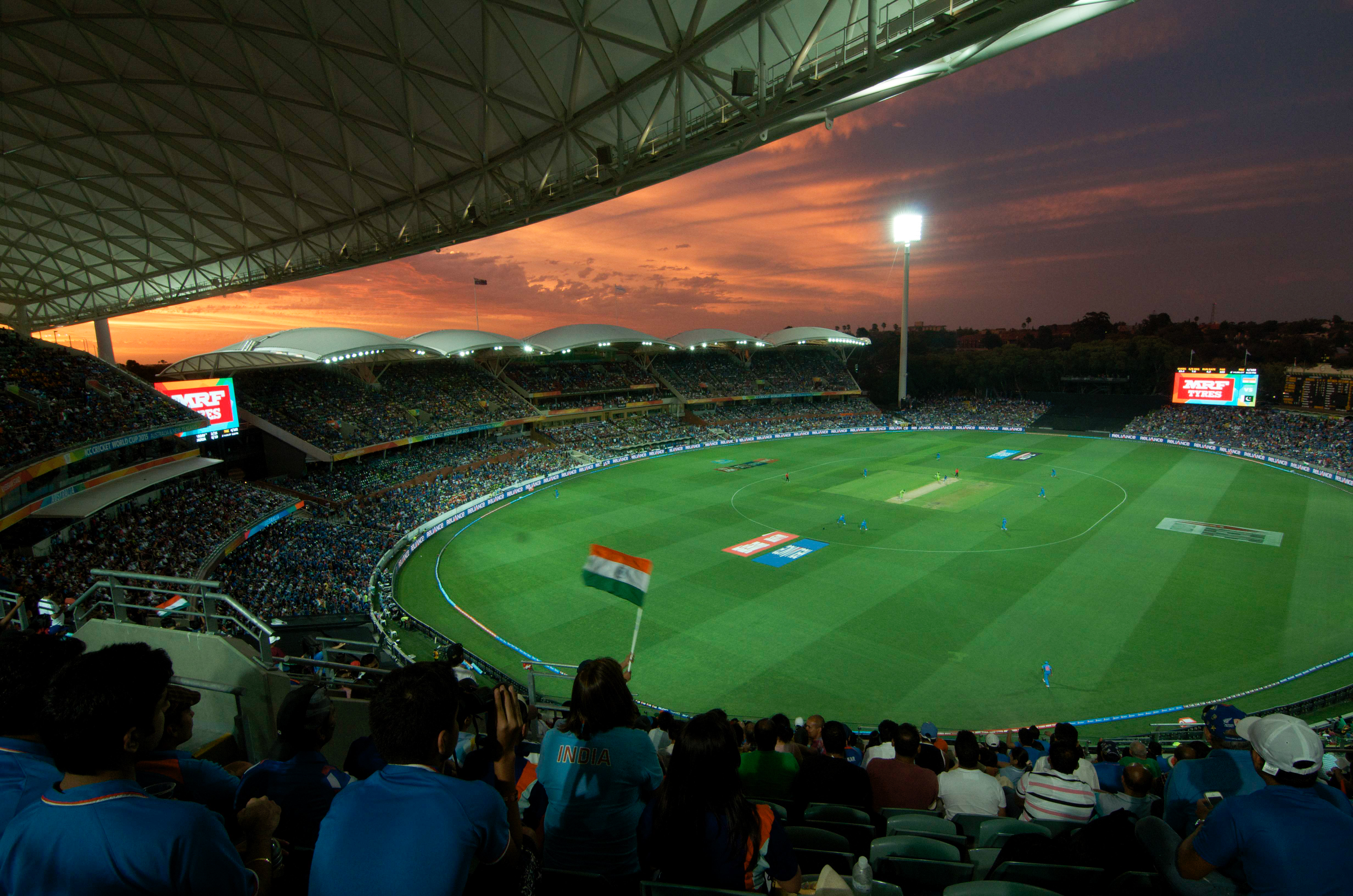
2015 Cricket World Cup match held at the newly re-developed Adelaide Oval

Cricket is a popular summer sport in South Australia, with over 100,000 people in the state participating. The sport is overseen by the South Australian Cricket Association (SACA), which administers the state's three professional teams: the South Australian Redbacks (a men's team competing in the Sheffield Shield and the Australian domestic limited-overs cricket tournament), the South Australian Scorpions (a women's team competing in the Women's National Cricket League), and the Adelaide Strikers (with both men's and women's teams playing in the Big Bash League and Women's Big Bash League respectively).

South Australia hosts international cricket matches, mostly at Adelaide Oval, which hosted its first Test match between Australia and England in 1884. Adelaide Oval also hosted the first ever day-night Test match, played between Australia and New Zealand from 27 to 29 November, 2015. South Australia has produced numerous international cricketers, including brothers Ian Chappell and Greg Chappell, who both captained Australia in international cricket.

=== Soccer ===
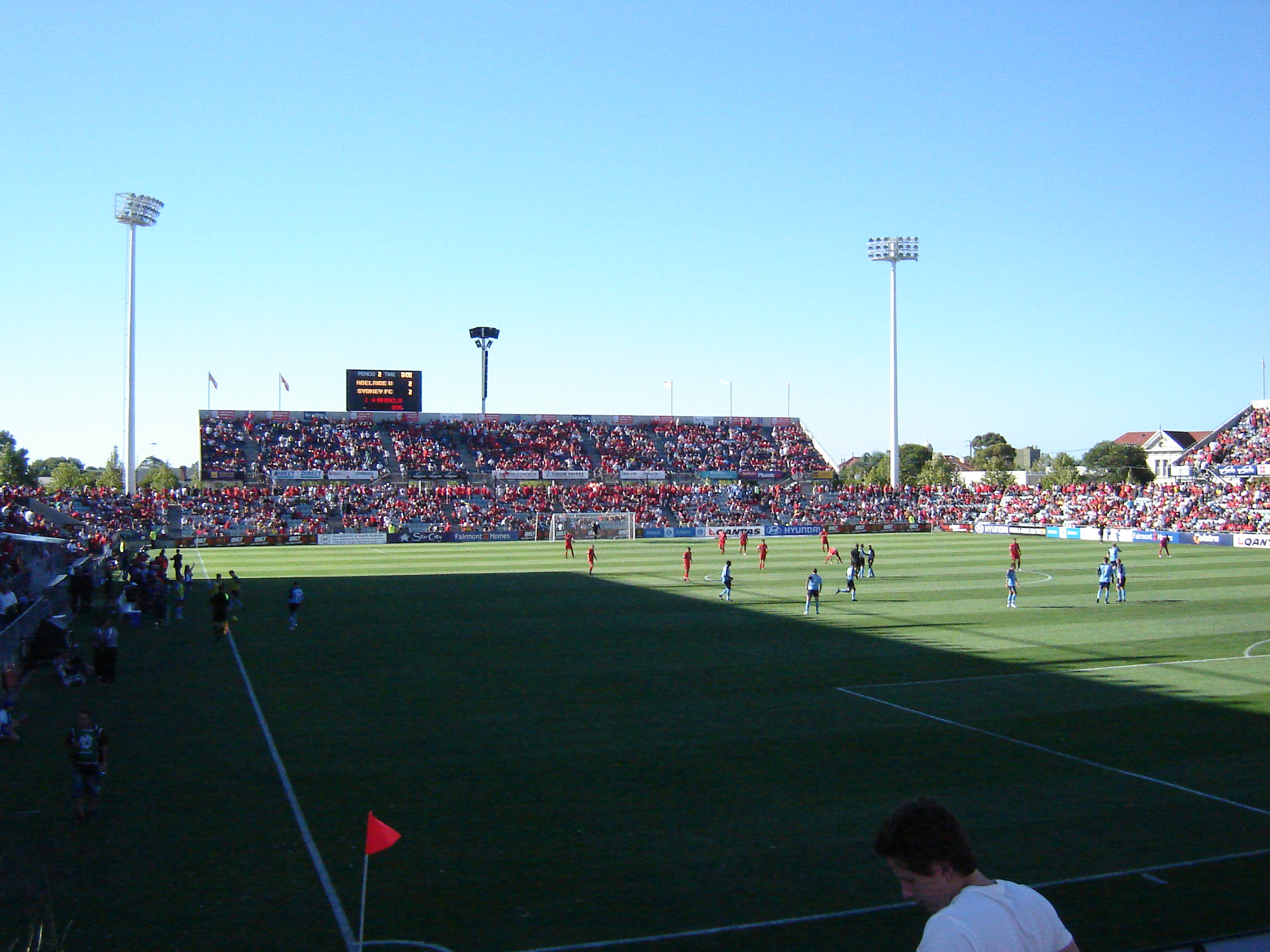
Adelaide United playing association football at Hindmarsh Stadium

South Australia's sole representative in the national A-League competition is Adelaide United FC. They won the 2016 A-League Grand Final and have won two pre-season cups and have made the finals every year except for 2009 and 2012 since the A-league started in 2005. Adelaide United have been one of the most successful teams in the A-league, despite failing to win an A-league Grand Final in their first two attempts. They have qualified for the AFC Champions League 4 times, making them the most represented club in Australia. Of these appearances they made the round of 16 in 2010, were runners up in 2008, and have made the round of 16 in the ongoing 2012 AFC Champions League. Their home ground is Hindmarsh Stadium, which has a capacity of 16,500. Hindmarsh was one of four non-Sydney venues chosen to host matches as part of the Men's Football tournament during the 2000 Summer Olympic Games.

Adelaide City remains South Australia's most successful club, having won three National Soccer League titles and three NSL Cups. City was the first side from South Australia to ever win a continental title when it won the 1987 Oceania Club Championship and it has also won a record 17 South Australian championships and 17 Federation Cups. Adelaide City contests the Adelaide derby against its crosstown rival West Adelaide, also a former national champion having been the first South Australian club to win the national league in 1978.

SASi Pirates were National Champions in 1997 and 98 in the Women's National Soccer League. Adelaide United 'Lady Reds' compete in the current national competition, the W-League. The state has produced Australian representatives such as Sharon Black and Dianne Alagich who have contributed to the international success of the Matlidas.

=== Netball ===
Netball is a significant sport in South Australia with a wide range of participation opportunities across metropolitan, regional and rural locations within the state.

The Adelaide Thunderbirds have participated in the premier netball league in Australasia, winning premierships in 1998, 1999 in the CBT, and 2010 in the ANZ Championship. Many South Australian players have represented Australia, including World Championship player and Australian captain Natalie von Bertouch, Rebecca Sanders and Kathryn Harby-Williams.

South Australia also participates in the Australian Netball League. In 2012 Southern Force took the title.

Netball continues to have a strong metro, regional and intrastate competition throughout South Australia with around 70,000 women and men participating across the state.

=== Basketball ===
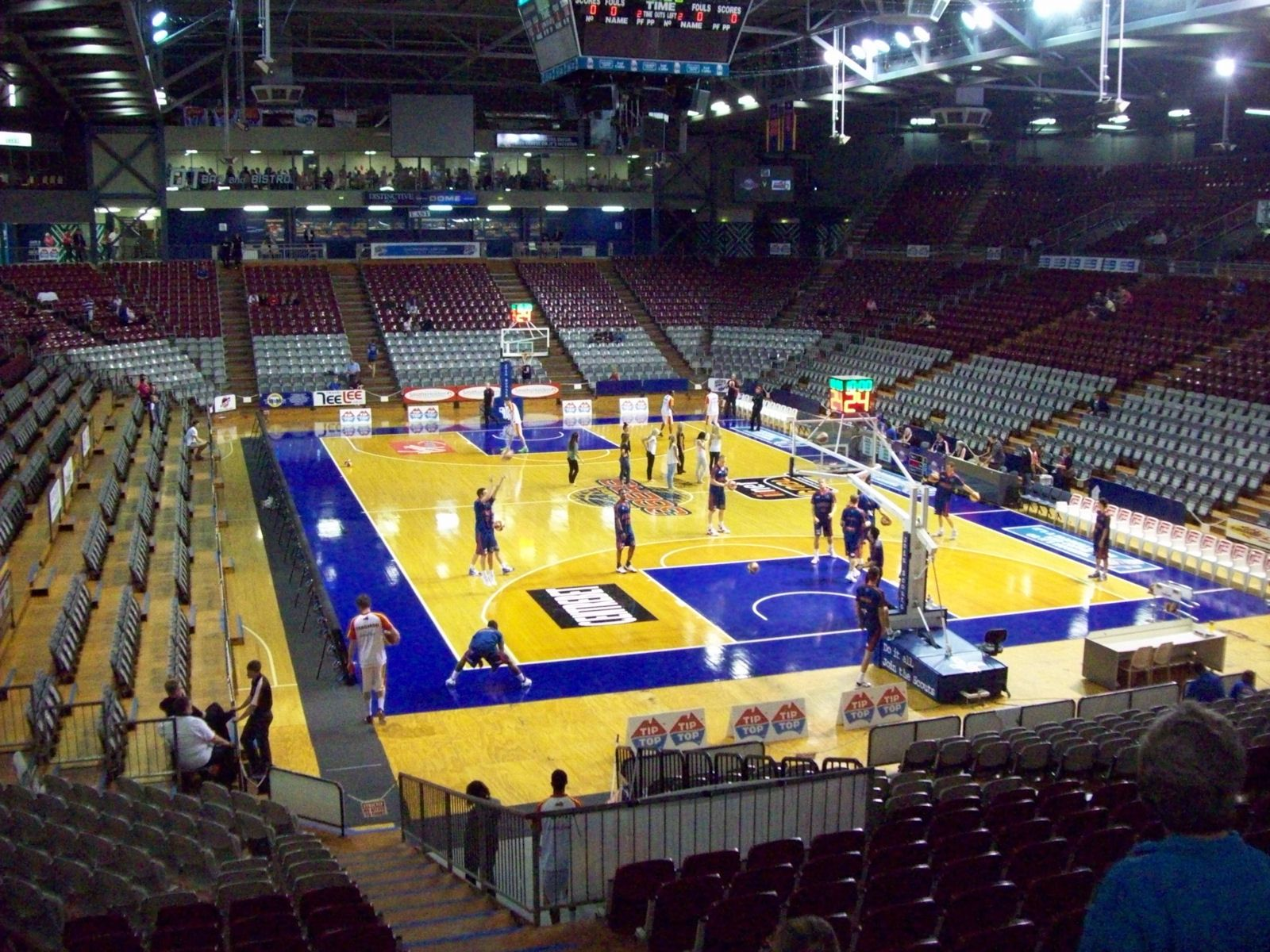
Titanium Security Arena, the home of basketball in South Australia

South Australia has a long history of producing outstanding representatives which have shaped and influenced Australia's high international standing in both men's and women's basketball. High-profile players and coaches include Olympians Lindsay Gaze, Phil Smyth, Peter Ali, Darryl Pearce, Mark Bradtke, Mike McKay, Tony Ronaldson, Brett Wheeler, Paul Rogers, Brad Newley and Brett Maher, as well as other Australian Boomers such as NBA players including Luke Schenscher (also a 36ers player) and Joe Ingles all came from (and in some cases still live in) Adelaide.

The Adelaide 36ers won NBL Championships in 1986, 1998, 1998–99 and 2001–02 and finished runner up in 1985, 1994 and 2013-14. The West Adelaide Bearcats (whose NBL team merged with the 36ers in 1985) won the NBL Championship in 1982 and finished runner up in 1983.

In women's basketball SA has produced outstanding Olympians including Rachael Sporn, Erin Phillips and Laura Hodges. SA teams have won numerous national championships, with the North Adelaide Rockets winning in 1990 while finishing runner up in 1981 (the inaugural season of the WNBL) and 1988. The Adelaide Lightning creating a historic era of success in 1994, 1995, 1996 and 1998 where it won 4 out of 5 National Championship Finals in the WNBL, as well as 2007–08. The Lightning also finished runner up in 1997 and 1999–2000. The West Adelaide Bearcats finished as WNBL runner up in 1984 while the Noarlunga Tigers finished runner up in 1985. Adelaide born Brendan Flynn was the coach of the Australian Opals at the 1984 Summer Olympics.

=== Rugby league ===
The state rugby league federation is the South Australian Rugby League. The game traces its roots in the state back to the 1940s, when the Port Adelaide rugby union team split in four, and defected to rugby league.

South Australia's only professional rugby league team, the Adelaide Rams, had a short but eventful existence. Originally the Australian Rugby League planned to relocate a Sydney team to Adelaide but the Super League war and the SARL's decision to align themselves with the News Ltd Super League in 1995 shut that idea down. Later in 1995, with Super League still only consisting of nine teams and Melbourne still aligned with the ARL, a decision was made to give Adelaide the 10th Super League license.

Brought into existence for the 1997 Super League season, the team had instant success. In 1998 they were selected to join the 20-team National Rugby League; however, rumours abounded that they were to be axed from the 1999 season as part of a rationalisation of teams (from 20 to 14) in the competition. At present however, the South Australian Rugby League still operates a local semi-professional competition consisting of both junior and adult teams from across Adelaide.

Adelaide Oval hosted State of Origin series games in both 2020 and 2023, with the latter drawing a state record rugby league attendance of 48,613.

== Minor sports ==
=== Baseball ===
South Australia is home to Baseball SA, which has a 12 club division 1 competition in the Adelaide metropolitan area.

Adelaide was also home to the former Adelaide Giants in the defunct Australian Baseball League. A new baseball league was approved by the SA sports commission and started in November 2010. Adelaide's team is called the Adelaide Bite. They formerly played their home games at Norwood Oval, but moved to the Diamond Sports Stadium in 2016 due to renovations at Norwood. The Adelaide Giants won the 2023 ABL Claxton Shield, breaking a 43 year drought after a 5-2 game three victory over the Perth Heat at West Beach.

=== Lacrosse ===
South Australia has dominated the Women's Lacrosse National Championships having won 34 out of 61 National championships since competitions started in 1961. South Australia won regularly during the 60's and 70's but in 1985 begun its total domination when it won the first of 11 National Championships in a row, an achievement that was recognised when it was inducted into the South Australian Sport Hall of Fame in 2018.

SA Coach Peter Koshnitsky having established a women's lacrosse program with the South Australian Sports Institute helped forge this success in partnership with outstanding leader and Australian & State captain and World Champion, Jenny Williams and other players of this era. The legacy of this era was highlighted by the continued success by South Australian teams at national championship level with success in 1997 and a further run of wins with six in a row from 1999 until 2005.

South Australia has produced significant players during this period who have had incredible careers at international level contributing importantly to the 1986 and 2005 IFWLA World Championship victories. Many South Australian players have also had success in the United States' NCAA Women's Lacrosse Competition including Hannah Nielsen and arguably the world's best player, Australian World Champion, Jen Adams.

In Men's Lacrosse South Australia has won 12 National Championships including three in a row from 2001 - 2003, and won again in 2012. In 2003 Peter Inge became the first Australian to play in Major League Lacrosse in the USA.

Lacrosse SA is the peak body for lacrosse in South Australia, managing competitions for Women and Men, and Girls and Boys from age 8 to adults. While the primary focus revolves around the main field lacrosse season from April to September, differing formats of lacrosse including Box Lacrosse, Junior and Senior indoor competitions, modified preseason, university and High School competitions offer opportunities to enjoy lacrosse year round.

=== Hockey ===
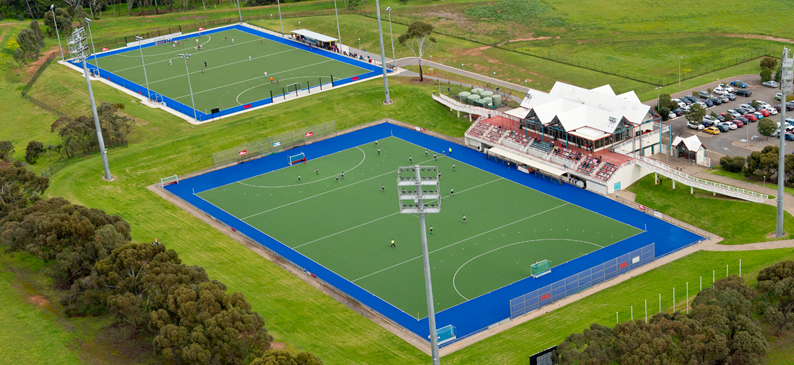
State Hockey Centre, the home of Field hockey in South Australia

South Australia has produced many fine international representatives and successful Olympians as part of the powerhouse performances of Australian Hockey on the international stage. Kookaburras representatives include Robert Haigh, Trevor Smith, Paul Lewis and Craig Victory.

South Australian women have featured prominently in the Hockeyroos. In fact in 1914 in the very first Australian women's test vs England, SA had five players in the Australian team as well as coach Judy Smith. In the 1980s and 1990s, South Australia saw many fine players achieving Olympic success including Sandra Pisani, Juliet Haslam and Alison Peek. State representative team SASI Suns won the National Championship in 1995 and the Southern Suns won in 2011 competing in the Australian Hockey League.

=== Softball ===
South Australia last won the national championship in 1956 but has produced representatives at international and Olympic level including Tracey Moseley and Simmone Morrow.

=== Rugby union ===
South Australian Rugby Union or "SA Rugby" is the governing body in the state.

Adelaide also hosted a rugby sevens tournament until 2011. The tournament consists of multiple national teams of seven players that represent their country.

=== American football ===
Gridiron is played in the South Australian Gridiron Association. Current teams are the Southern District Oilers, South City Chiefs, Eastside Razorbacks, Port Adelaide Spartans and the Adelaide Eagles.

South Australia also fields a state team known as the SA Swarm.

=== Other teams ===
- Adelaide Adrenaline - ice hockey
- Adelaide Jets - water polo
- Adelaide Sensation FC
