= 2022 World Lacrosse Women's Championship =

International lacrosse competition

Tournament details
- Host country: United States
- Venue(s): Towson University, Towson, Maryland (in 1 host city)
- Dates: June 29 – July 9, 2022
- Teams: 30

Final positions
- Champions: United States (9th title)
- Runners-up: Canada
- Third place: England
- Fourth place: Australia

Tournament statistics
- Games played: 110
- Goals scored: 2,034 (18.49 per game)
- Attendance: 44,000 (400 per game)

Awards
- MVP: (United States) Taylor Cummings

The 2022 World Lacrosse Women's Championship, the 11th Women's World Championship (previously known as the Women's Lacrosse World Cup), is the preeminent international women's lacrosse tournament. The tournament was held at Towson University in Towson, Maryland, United States. Originally scheduled for July 2021, the tournament was postponed a year due to the COVID-19 pandemic.

The United States won the ninth title of the tournament.

== Hosting ==
The United States was announced as hosts of the tournament in February 2018. Games were hosted at Towson University in Towson, Maryland. Two venues were used—the Tiger Field–Lower Fields Complex, consisting of two separate full fields with lighting and scoreboards used by the university's women's lacrosse and women's soccer programs, and Johnny Unitas Stadium, also used by the women's lacrosse program but more noted as home to the school's football and men's lacrosse programs.

== Tournament ==
=== Qualified teams ===
A total of 30 nations qualified for the 2021 Women's Lacrosse World Championship. The top ten nations at the 2017 Women's Lacrosse World Cup automatically qualified while twenty other nations earned their place through participating in the continental qualifiers. China, Chinese Taipei, and Finland participated in the qualifiers but failed to qualify but they were designated as potential participants should a qualified team withdraw from the tournament. Kenya withdrew with China, a participant of the 2017 Women's Lacrosse World Cup unlike the two other teams, named as replacement. Argentina, Jamaica, Norway, Puerto Rico, and Uganda will make their debut in the world championship.

2017 WLWC participants (10)

- United States (host)
- Canada
- England
- Australia
- Scotland
- Israel
- Wales
- New Zealand
- Japan
- Czech Republic

Africa (2)

- ~~Kenya~~ (withdrew)
- ~~Uganda~~ (withdrew)

Asia-Pacific (2)

- South Korea
- Hong Kong
- China (replacement)

Europe (15)

- Germany
- Ireland
- Netherlands
- Latvia
- Norway
- Austria
- Switzerland
- Italy
- Sweden
- Spain

Americas (6)

- Haudenoseaunee
- Puerto Rico
- Jamaica
- Mexico
- Colombia
- Argentina

== Group stage ==
=== Pool A ===
Pos	Team	Pld	W	L	GF	GA	GD	Qualification	(United States)	(Canada)	(England)	(Australia)	(Scotland)
1	United States (H)	4	4	0	67	26	+41	Qualification for Championship Division	—	16–11	15–9	16–5	20–1
2	Canada	4	3	1	53	30	+23	Qualification for Championship Division	11–16	—	13–8	9–5	20–1
3	England	4	2	2	47	39	+8	Qualification for Championship Division	9–15	8–13	—	12–4	18–7
4	Australia	4	1	3	31	41	−10	Qualification for Championship Division	5–16	5–9	4–12	—	17–4
5	Scotland	4	0	4	13	75	−62	Qualification for Championship Division	1–20	1–20	7–18	4–17	—

(H) Hosts

=== Pool B ===
Pos	Team	Pld	W	L	GF	GA	GD	Qualification	(Israel)	(Puerto Rico)	(Netherlands)	(Norway)	(South Korea)
1	Israel	4	4	0	57	27	+30	Qualification for Championship Division	—	14–11	–	—	18–6
2	Puerto Rico	4	3	1	50	23	+27	Qualification for Championship Division	—	—	—	12–4	13–2
3	Netherlands	4	2	2	27	32	−5	Qualification for Platinum Division	5–9	3–14	—	—	—
4	Norway	4	1	3	21	42	−21	Qualification for Platinum Division	5–16	—	4–7	—	—
5	South Korea	4	0	4	20	51	−31	Qualification for Platinum Division	—	—	5–12	7–8	—

=== Pool C ===
Pos	Team	Pld	W	L	GF	GA	GD	Qualification	(Germany)	(Wales)	(Latvia)	(Jamaica)	(Uganda)
1	Germany	3	3	0	35	13	+22	Qualification for Championship Division	—	–	10–2	15–4	–
2	Wales	3	2	1	35	21	+14	Qualification for Championship Division	7–10	—	–	–	–
3	Latvia	3	1	2	18	30	−12	Qualification for Platinum Division	–	7–15	—	–	–
4	Jamaica	3	0	3	13	37	−24	Qualification for Platinum Division	–	4–13	5–9	—	–
5	Uganda	0	0	0	0	0	0	Withdrew	–	–	–	–	—

Uganda withdrew as they were unable to attend due to visa procurement issues.

=== Pool D ===
Pos	Team	Pld	W	L	GF	GA	GD	Qualification	(New Zealand)	(Republic of Ireland)	(Hong Kong)	(Austria)	(Spain)
1	New Zealand	4	4	0	46	20	+26	Qualification for Championship Division	—	10–8	–	–	10–1
2	Ireland	4	3	1	44	37	+7	Qualification for Championship Division	—	—	12–11(OT)	14–10	–
3	Hong Kong	4	2	2	46	25	+21	Qualification for Championship Division	8–10	—	—	—	12–1
4	Austria	4	1	3	22	51	−29	Qualification for Platinum Division	3–16	—	2–15	—	–
5	Spain	4	0	4	14	39	−25	Qualification for Platinum Division	—	6–10	—	6–7	—

=== Pool E ===
Pos	Team	Pld	W	L	GF	GA	GD	Qualification	(Japan)	(Haudenosaunee)	(China)	(Switzerland)	(Argentina)
1	Japan	4	4	0	78	13	+65	Qualification for Championship Division	—	13–8	19–1	–	–
2	Haudenoseaunee	4	3	1	57	26	+31	Qualification for Championship Division	—	—	–	20–5	20–2
3	China	4	2	2	31	45	−14	Qualification for Platinum Division	—	6–9	—	–	11–10
4	Switzerland	4	1	3	21	61	−40	Qualification for Platinum Division	1–21	—	7–13	—	–
5	Argentina	4	0	4	22	64	−42	Qualification for Platinum Division	3–25	—	—	7–8(OT)	—

=== Pool F ===
Pos	Team	Pld	W	L	GF	GA	GD	Qualification	(Czech Republic)	(Mexico)	(Italy)	(Sweden)	(Colombia)
1	Czech Republic	4	4	0	66	24	+42	Qualification for Championship Division	—	–	13–10	19–5	–
2	Mexico	4	3	1	47	29	+18	Qualification for Championship Division	6–14	—	—	18–6	–
3	Italy	4	2	2	49	29	+20	Qualification for Platinum Division	—	5–8	—	–	17–2
4	Sweden	4	1	3	26	58	−32	Qualification for Platinum Division	—	—	6–17	—	9–4
5	Colombia	4	0	4	13	61	−48	Qualification for Platinum Division	3–20	4–15	—	—	—

=== Ranking of Third-Placed Teams: Pools B-F ===
Pos	Grp	Team	Pld	W	L	GF	GA	GD	Qualification
1	D	Hong Kong	4	2	2	46	25	+21	Qualification to Championship Division
2	F	Italy	4	2	2	49	29	+20	Qualification to Platinum Division
3	E	China	4	2	2	31	45	−14	Qualification to Platinum Division
4	B	Netherlands	4	2	2	27	32	−5	Qualification to Platinum Division
5	C	Latvia	3	1	2	18	30	−12	Qualification to Platinum Division

First match(es) will be played: 30 June 2022. Source:

== Championship Division ==
First Round
5 July
United States	21
Hong Kong	0
5 July
New Zealand	3
Japan	12
5 July
Scotland	9
Haudenoseaunee	11
5 July
Australia	18
Ireland	4
5 July
England	11
Wales	1
5 July
Israel	12
Mexico	3
5 July
Germany	9
Czech Republic	14
5 July
Canada	17
Puerto Rico	6

Quarterfinals
6 July
United States	18
Japan	3
6 July
Haudenoseaunee	3
Australia	17
6 July
England	13
Israel	5
6 July
Czech Republic	7
Canada	15

Semifinals
7 July
United States	17
Australia	2
7 July
England	9
Canada	11

Final
9 July
United States	11
Canada	8
Third place
9 July
Australia	7
England	8 (3OT)

=== Places 5-8 ===
Semifinal
8 July
Japan	12
Haudenoseaunee	6
8 July
Israel	11
Czech Republic	10

5th position game
9 July
Japan	13
Israel	4
7th position game
9 July
Haudenoseaunee	11
Czech Republic	12

=== Consolation Bracket ===
Quarterfinals
6 July
Hong Kong	8
New Zealand	15
6 July
Scotland	9
Ireland	8
6 July
Wales	17
Mexico	5
6 July
Germany	8
Puerto Rico	10

Semifinals
7 July
New Zealand	8
Scotland	9
7 July
Wales	9
Puerto Rico	6

9th position game
8 July
Scotland	3
Wales	9
11th position game
8 July
New Zealand	6
Puerto Rico	7

=== Places 13-16 ===
Semifinals
7 July
Hong Kong	9
Ireland	13
7 July
Mexico	6
Germany	8

13th position game
8 July
Ireland	9(2OT)
Germany	8
15th position game
8 July
Hong Kong	11
Mexico	15

== Platinum Division ==
First Round
5 July
Norway	14
Jamaica	6
5 July
Sweden	12
Argentina	10
5 July
Latvia	13
Colombia	1
5 July
Austria	7
South Korea	13
5 July
Switzerland	5
Spain	6(OT)

Quarterfinals
6 July
Italy	7(OT)
Norway	6
6 July
Sweden	11
Latvia	12
6 July
China	8
South Korea	5
6 July
Netherlands	15
Spain	2

Semifinals
7 July
Italy	9
Latvia	7
7 July
China	8
Netherlands	13

17th position
8 July
Italy	7
Netherlands	9
19th position
8 July
Latvia	6
China	11

=== Places 21-24 ===
Semifinals
7 July
Norway	11
Sweden	3
7 July
South Korea	10
Spain	6

21st position game
8 July
Norway	7
South Korea	12
23rd position game
8 July
Sweden	9(2OT)
Spain	8

=== Platinum Consolation ===
Play-in
6 July†
Argentina	14
Colombia	3

Semifinals
7 July
Jamaica	11
Argentina	12
7 July
Switzerland	4
Austria	8

25th position game
8 July
Argentina	6
Austria	7(OT)
27th position game
8 July
Jamaica	5
Switzerland	8

†Loser of game places 29th

== Final ranking ==
Rank	Team	Record
Gold medal	United States	8-0
Silver medal	Canada	6-2
Bronze medal	England	5-3
4th	Australia	3-5
5th	Japan	7-1
6th	Israel	6-2
7th	Czech Republic	7-1
8th	Haudenoseaunee	5-3
9th	Wales	5-2
10th	Scotland	2-6
11th	Puerto Rico	5-3
12th	New Zealand	5-3
13th	Ireland	5-3
14th	Germany	3-4
15th	Mexico	4-4
16th	Hong Kong	2-6
17th	Netherlands	5-2
18th	Italy	4-3
19th	China	4-3
20th	Latvia	3-4
21st	South Korea	3-5
22nd	Norway	3-5
23rd	Sweden	3-5
24th	Spain	1-7
25th	Austria	3-4
26th	Argentina	2-6
27th	Switzerland	2-5
28th	Jamaica	0-6
29th	Colombia	0-6

== All-World Team ==
(Canada) Aurora Cordingley
(United States) Taylor Cummings
(Canada) Dana Dobbie
(England) Oliva Hompe
(United States) Marie McCool
(United States) Alice Mercer
(Canada) Kaylin Morrissette
(Australia) Hannah Nielsen
(England) Brittany Read
(United States) Kayla Treanor

Most Valuable Player

(United States) Taylor Cummings
