= Sarah Bullard =

American lacrosse player

Personal information
- Nationality: USA
- Born: August 14, 1988 (age 37) Needham, Massachusetts, USA
- Height: 5 ft 4 in (163 cm)

Sport
- Position: Midfield
- Shoots: Left/Right
- NCAA team: Duke Blue Devils
- Pro career: 2007–
Medal record
World Championships
Gold medal – first place	2009 Czech Republic
Gold medal – first place	2013 Canada

Sarah Bullard McDaniel (born August 14, 1988) is an American women's lacrosse player. Having played with the Duke Blue Devils at the collegiate level, she was named to the US national team for the 2015–16 season. In 2016, she was selected by the Boston Storm with their third pick overall in the inaugural United Women's Lacrosse League Draft.

== Playing career ==
=== NCAA ===
Having graduated from Duke in 2011, Bullard logged 167 points and scored 141 times. During the 2010 season, she set career highs in goals (48), assists (11) and points (59).

=== USA Lacrosse ===
In August 2007, Bullard was the team captain of the U.S. Under-19 National Team, winning the FIL U19 Women's World Cup.

Bullard would join the national team player pool in 2008 and capture a gold medal at the 2009 Women's Lacrosse World Cup. She would score eight goals during the tournament, including one in the gold medal game against Australia. Of note, she would also score eight goals during the 2013 edition of the Women's Lacrosse World Cup, capturing another gold for the United States.

== Awards and honors ==
- 2008 ACC All-Academic team
- 2009 Second-team IWLCA/U.S. Lacrosse All-America selection
- 2010 First-team IWLCA/U.S. Lacrosse All-America selection
