= 1982 Women's Lacrosse World Cup =

International lacrosse competition

1982 IFWLA Brine Women's Lacrosse World Cup
Tournament details
- Host country: England
- Venue(s): Trent Bridge, Nottingham
- Dates: 20–26 September

Final positions
- Champions: United States (1st title)
- Runners-up: Australia
- Third place: Canada

Awards
- MVP: (Australia) Shirley Ploog

The 1982 Women's Lacrosse World Cup was the first Women's Lacrosse World Cup and was played at Trent Bridge in Nottingham from September 20–26, 1982. USA defeated Australia in the final to win the tournament.

The tournament was organised by the Great Britain Lacrosse Council on behalf of the International Federation of Women's Lacrosse Associations (IFWLA) and sponsored by Brine.

== Results ==
=== Round robin ===
Pos	Team	Pld	W	L	GF	GA	GD	Pts	Qualification
1	Australia	5	5	0	52	27	+25	10	Advance to Final
2	United States	5	4	1	52	19	+33	9	Advance to Final
3	Scotland	5	2	3	32	43	−11	7	Advance to 3rd place game
4	Canada	5	2	3	24	47	−23	7	Advance to 3rd place game
5	England	5	1	4	39	37	+2	6	Advance to 5th place games
6	Wales	5	1	4	29	55	−26	6	Advance to 5th place games

Source: Lacrosse Canada

Team 1	Team 2	Score
England	Scotland	5-8
Australia	United States	7-4
Wales	Canada	7-8
Canada	Scotland	3-10
Australia	England	7-6
Wales	United States	1-14
England	Canada	5-7
Scotland	United States	3-14
Wales	Australia	8-10
England	United States	5-11
Australia	Canada	16-3
Wales	Scotland	9-5
England	Wales	18-4
Australia	Scotland	12-6
United States	Canada	9-3

=== Play-offs ===
==== Fifth place ====
September 25, 1982	England	16–7	Wales

==== Third place ====
September 25, 1982	Canada	9–4	Scotland

==== Final ====
September 25, 1982	United States	10–7 (ET)	Australia

== Final ranking ==
Rank	Team
Gold medal	United States
Silver medal	Australia
Bronze medal	Canada
4th	Scotland
5th	England
6th	Wales

== All-World Team ==
Goalkeeper	Defence	Defence Wings	Centre	Attack Wings	Attack
(United States) Sandra Hoody	(Wales) Vivien Jones; (Scotland) Nicki Reid; (England) Karin Pottinger	(Australia) Margaret Barlow; (United States) Lynn Cox	(Australia) Colleen Fogarty	(United States) Jane Diamond; (England) Jane Emerson	(Australia) Suzanne Mellis; (United States) Lesley Blankin; (Australia) Mary Pickett

Most Valuable Player

(Australia) Shirley Ploog
