= 2025 Pan-American Women's Lacrosse Championship =

International lacrosse competition

Tournament details
- Host country: United States
- Venue: 1 (in 1 host city)
- Dates: June 24–30
- Teams: 8

Final positions
- Champions: United States (1st title)
- Runners-up: Canada
- Third place: Haudenosaunee
- Fourth place: Puerto Rico

The 2025 Pan-American Women's Lacrosse Championship is an international women's lacrosse tournament for members of the Pan-American Lacrosse Association (PALA). It was held from June 24 to 30, 2025 at the Lake Myrtle Sports Complex in Auburndale, Florida.

The four semifinalists and the fifth placed team qualified for the 2026 World Lacrosse Women's Championship in Tokyo, Japan. The three remaining teams were eligible to join the Division II tournament in Wrocław, Poland.

The United States won their first title, after defeated Canada 21–11 in the final.

== Venue ==
Auburndale, Florida
| Lake Myrtle Sports Complex | 2025 Pan-American Women's Lacrosse Championship (Florida) |
| Capacity: N/A | 2025 Pan-American Women's Lacrosse Championship (Florida) |

== Preliminary round ==
=== Pool A ===
| Pos | Team | Pld | W | L | GF | GA | GD | Qualification |
|---|---|---|---|---|---|---|---|---|
| 1 | United States (H) | 3 | 3 | 0 | 71 | 8 | +63 | Advance to Semifinals |
| 2 | Puerto Rico | 3 | 2 | 1 | 39 | 36 | +3 | Advance to Semifinals |
| 3 | Mexico | 3 | 1 | 2 | 30 | 45 | −15 | Advance to 5th–8th place games |
| 4 | Peru | 3 | 0 | 3 | 14 | 65 | −51 | Advance to 5th–8th place games |

Source: World Lacrosse
(H) Hosts

| June 26, 2025; 11:00 | United States | 21–5 (4–1, 4–2, 8–2, 5–0) | Puerto Rico | Lake Myrtle Sports Complex Field 1, Auburndale |

Game reference

| June 26, 2025; 13:30 | Mexico | 20–6 (5–2, 7–0, 4–3, 4–1) | Peru | Lake Myrtle Sports Complex Field 1, Auburndale |

Game reference

| June 27, 2025; 10:00 | Puerto Rico | 14–8 (3–1, 2–4, 7–0, 2–3) | Mexico | Lake Myrtle Sports Complex Field 2, Auburndale |

Game reference

| June 27, 2025; 12:30 | Peru | 1–25 (0–11, 0–8, 0–3, 1–3) | United States | Lake Myrtle Sports Complex Field 2, Auburndale |

Game reference

| June 28, 2025; 10:00 | United States | 25–2 (8–0, 8–0, 4–1, 5–1) | Mexico | Lake Myrtle Sports Complex Field 1, Auburndale |

Game reference

| June 28, 2025; 12:30 | Puerto Rico | 20–7 (5–1, 4–2, 7–1, 4–3) | Peru | Lake Myrtle Sports Complex Field 1, Auburndale |

Game reference

=== Pool B ===
| Pos | Team | Pld | W | L | GF | GA | GD | Qualification |
|---|---|---|---|---|---|---|---|---|
| 1 | Canada | 3 | 3 | 0 | 60 | 11 | +49 | Advance to Semifinals |
| 2 | Haudenosaunee | 3 | 2 | 1 | 41 | 29 | +12 | Advance to Semifinals |
| 3 | Argentina | 3 | 1 | 2 | 28 | 51 | −23 | Advance to 5th–8th place games |
| 4 | Jamaica | 3 | 0 | 3 | 16 | 54 | −38 | Advance to 5th–8th place games |

Source: World Lacrosse

| June 26, 2025; 11:00 | Canada | 14–8 (5–1, 3–4, 5–1, 1–2) | Haudenosaunee | Lake Myrtle Sports Complex Field 2, Auburndale |

Game reference

| June 26, 2025; 13:30 | Argentina | 17–9 (4–3, 6–1, 3–1, 4–4) | Jamaica | Lake Myrtle Sports Complex Field 2, Auburndale |

Game reference

| June 27, 2025; 10:00 | Haudenosaunee | 18–9 (5–2, 5–1, 4–3, 4–3) | Argentina | Lake Myrtle Sports Complex Field 1, Auburndale |

Game reference

| June 27, 2025; 12:30 | Jamaica | 1–22 (0–6, 0–4, 1–6, 0–6) | Canada | Lake Myrtle Sports Complex Field 1, Auburndale |

Game reference

| June 28, 2025; 10:00 | Canada | 24–2 (7–1, 4–0, 8–0, 5–1) | Argentina | Lake Myrtle Sports Complex Field 2, Auburndale |

Game reference

| June 28, 2025; 12:30 | Haudenosaunee | 15–6 (4–1, 4–1, 2–2, 5–2) | Jamaica | Lake Myrtle Sports Complex Field 2, Auburndale |

Game reference

== 5th–8th placement round ==
5th–8th games
A3 | Mexico | 10
B4 | Jamaica | 8
B3 | Argentina | 21
A4 | Peru | 8

5th position game
A3 | Mexico | 8
B3 | Argentina | 16
7th position game
B4 | Jamaica | 13
A4 | Peru | 5

=== Places 5–8 ===
| June 29, 2025; 10:00 | Mexico | 10–8 (2–2, 5–0, 1–3, 2–3) | Jamaica | Lake Myrtle Sports Complex Field 2, Auburndale |

Game reference

| June 29, 2025; 12:30 | Argentina | 21–8 (5–1, 6–1, 7–1, 3–5) | Peru | Lake Myrtle Sports Complex Field 2, Auburndale |

Game reference

=== 7th place game ===
| June 30, 2025; 11:30 | Jamaica | 13–5 (3–2, 5–1, 2–1, 3–1) | Peru | Lake Myrtle Sports Complex Field 2, Auburndale |

Game reference

=== 5th place game ===
| June 30, 2025; 9:00 | Mexico | 8–16 (2–4, 0–4, 1–5, 5–3) | Argentina | Lake Myrtle Sports Complex Field 2, Auburndale |

Game reference

== Final round ==
Semifinals
A1 | United States | 18
B2 | Haudenosaunee | 8
B1 | Canada | 16
A2 | Puerto Rico | 7

Final
A1 | United States | 21
B1 | Canada | 11
Third place game
B2 | Haudenosaunee | 12
A2 | Puerto Rico | 10

=== Semifinals ===
| June 29, 2025; 10:00 | United States | 18–8 (4–2, 4–3, 2–2, 8–1) | Haudenosaunee | Lake Myrtle Sports Complex Field 1, Auburndale |

Game reference

| June 29, 2025; 12:30 | Canada | 16–7 (5–2, 4–2, 3–1, 4–2) | Puerto Rico | Lake Myrtle Sports Complex Field 1, Auburndale |

Game reference

=== 3rd place game ===
| June 30, 2025; 10:00 | Haudenosaunee | 12–10 (1–3, 1–4, 6–1, 4–2) | Puerto Rico | Lake Myrtle Sports Complex Field 1, Auburndale |

Game reference

=== Final ===
| June 30, 2025; 13:00 | United States | 21–11 (6–3, 5–2, 4–4, 6–2) | Canada | Lake Myrtle Sports Complex Field 1, Auburndale |

Game reference

== Final standings ==
| Rank | Team |
|---|---|
| 1st place, gold medalist(s) | United States |
| 2nd place, silver medalist(s) | Canada |
| 3rd place, bronze medalist(s) | Haudenosaunee |
| 4 | Puerto Rico |
| 5 | Argentina |
| 6 | Mexico |
| 7 | Jamaica |
| 8 | Peru |

| Qualify to the 2026 World Lacrosse Women's Championship via standings |
| Qualify to the 2026 World Lacrosse Women's Championship Division II |

== See also ==
- 2026 Pan-American Men's Lacrosse Championship
