= 1989 Women's Lacrosse World Cup =

International lacrosse competition

Tournament details
- Host country: Australia
- Venue(s): Perth, Australia
- Dates: 2–9 September

Final positions
- Champions: United States (2nd title)
- Runners-up: England
- Third place: Australia

The 1989 Women's Lacrosse World Cup was the third Women's Lacrosse World Cup and was played in Perth, Australia from 2–9 September 1989. The United States defeated England in the final to win the tournament.

== Results ==
Date	Team 1	Team 2	Score
Sep 2	United States	Scotland	10-5
Sep 2	England	Wales	8-4
Sep 2	Australia	Canada	6-4
Sep 3	United States	England	3-2
Sep 3	Canada	Wales	11-4
Sep 3	Australia	Scotland	4-1
Sep 5	United States	Wales	18-5
Sep 5	England	Australia	8-3
Sep 5	Canada	Scotland	5-4
Sep 6	Australia	United States	2-1
Sep 6	Scotland	Wales	5-3
Sep 6	England	Canada	13-3
Sep 8	United States	Canada	17-2
Sep 8	Australia	Wales	9-3
Sep 8	England	Scotland	7-1

== Table ==
Pos	Team	Pld	W	D	L	GF	GA	GD	Pts
1	United States	5	4	0	1	49	16	+33	8
2	England	5	4	0	1	38	14	+24	8
3	Australia	5	4	0	1	23	17	+6	8
4	Canada	5	2	0	3	25	43	−18	4
5	Scotland	5	1	0	4	16	29	−13	2
6	Wales	5	0	0	5	19	51	−32	0

== Fifth Place Play Off (September 9) ==
- Scotland v Wales 5-3

== Third Place Play Off (September 9) ==
- Australia v Canada 10-1

== Final (September 9) ==
- United States v England 7-6

== Final ranking ==
Rank	Team
Gold medal	United States
Silver medal	England
Bronze medal	Australia
4th	Canada
5th	Scotland
6th	Wales
