= Czech Republic women's national lacrosse team =

National sports team

Czech Republic
- Association: Czech Lacrosse Union
- Confederation: ELF (Europe)

Women's World Championship
- Appearances: 6 (first in 1993)
- Best result: Seventh (2022)

The Czech Republic women's national lacrosse team represents the Czech Republic at women's lacrosse. It is governed by the Czech Lacrosse Union and is a full member of the World Lacrosse.

== History ==
The Czech Republic women's lacrosse team has been active as early as 1989 when it played in a tournament in Prague against the United States and Sweden.

They debuted at the Women's Lacrosse World Cup (later renamed as the Women's Championship) in the 1993 edition.

The withdrew from the 2013 Women's Lacrosse World Cup in Oshawa despite qualifying for the tournament due to financial issues.

Sponsored by the National Sports Agency, the Czech Republic women's national team participated at the 2022 World Lacrosse Women's Championship. They made their best finish in the tournament, placing seventh.

== Competitive record ==
=== World Lacrosse Championship ===
Year	Host	GP	W	L	GF	GA	Finish
2009	Czech Republic	7	5	2	87	39	9th
2013	Canada	Withdrew					–
2017	England	8	5	3	105	51	10th
2022	United States	6	6	2	97	59	7th
2026	Japan	5	2	3	46	64	13th
Total	−	–	–	–	–	–	No Medal
