= 2009 Women's Lacrosse World Cup =

International lacrosse competition

2009 FIL Women's Lacrosse World Cup
- Women's Lacrosse World Cup

Tournament details
- Host country: Czech Republic
- Venue: 1 (in 1 host city)
- Dates: 17–27 June
- Teams: 16

Final positions
- Champions: United States (6th title)
- Runners-up: Australia
- Third place: Canada
- Fourth place: England

Tournament statistics
- Scoring leader(s): Sarah Sweerts (29)

The 2009 Women's Lacrosse World Cup, the eighth World Cup played, is the preeminent international women's lacrosse tournament. The tournament was held at SK Slavia Prague Sport Centre in Prague, Czech Republic from 17 until 27 June 2009.

== Sponsoring organizations ==
The event is sponsored by the Federation of International Lacrosse (FIL) and the Czech Women’s Lacrosse (CWL). This tournament was first held in 1982 and is held every four years. It is the first major event to be sponsored by the FIL. In August 2008, the men's international governing body International Lacrosse Federation merged with the former governing body for women's lacrosse, the International Federation of Women's Lacrosse Associations, to form the Federation of International Lacrosse (FIL).

The CWL also sponsors the 12th annual Prague Cup as an associated event. This tournament, held at the same venue as the World Cup, allows international club teams to compete at the same time in the open event.

== Teams ==
Sixteen teams, the most ever, competed in the 2009 World Cup tournament. New entries include: Austria, Denmark, Haudenosaunee, Ireland, South Korea, and the Netherlands. The Haudenosaunee is the first team of women to represent the indigenous peoples of the Americas in the Women's World Cup. Lacrosse is seen as a sacred sport to the Iroquois and was traditionally a sport reserved for only men. In earlier tournaments, clan mothers protested the women's team playing the sacred sport and threatened to lay down on the field to prevent them from playing.

The tournament saw the return of defending gold medal winners Australia, as well as Canada, England, Germany, Japan, New Zealand, Scotland, United States, Wales and the Czech Republic.

Teams were split into three separate pools. Pool A (Australia, United States, England, Canada, and Japan) and Pool B (Wales, Scotland, Czech Republic, Germany and New Zealand) played round robins games against each team in their pool seeding for the quarterfinals. Pool C (Austria, Denmark, Haudenosaunee, Ireland, Korea and Netherlands) played in two mini-pools ((I)& (II)) to determine who will advance to the next round of play. The quarterfinals were followed by consolation games, the semifinals, and the bronze and gold medal games.

== Round Robin results ==
Pool A
Pos	Team	Pld	W	L	GF	GA	GD	WPCT	Qualification
1	United States	4	4	0	64	33	+31	100.00	Quarterfinal
2	Australia	4	3	1	64	31	+33	75.00	Quarterfinal
3	Canada	4	2	2	48	48	0	50.00	Quarterfinal
4	England	4	1	3	41	45	−4	25.00	Quarterfinal
5	Japan	4	0	4	33	93	−60	0.00	Quarterfinal

Pool B
Pos	Team	Pld	W	L	GF	GA	GD	WPCT	Qualification
1	Wales	4	4	0	52	22	+30	100.00	Quarterfinal
2	Scotland	4	3	1	54	19	+35	75.00	Quarterfinal
3	Czech Republic	4	2	2	37	27	+10	50.00	
4	Germany	4	1	3	21	44	−23	25.00	
5	New Zealand	4	0	4	15	67	−52	0.00	

Pool C1
Pos	Team	Pld	W	L	GF	GA	GD	WPCT
1	Haudenosaunee	2	2	0	36	2	+34	100.00
2	Austria	2	1	1	16	27	−11	50.00
3	Denmark	2	0	2	9	32	−23	0.00

Pool C2
Pos	Team	Pld	W	L	GF	GA	GD	WPCT	Qualification
1	Ireland	2	2	0	45	13	+32	100.00	Quarterfinal
2	Netherlands	2	1	1	37	24	+13	50.00	
3	South Korea	2	0	2	1	46	−45	0.00	

== Quarterfinals ==
places 1-8:

USA 22 - 5 Ireland
Australia 17 - 4 Scotland
Canada 10 - 6 Wales
England 19 - 12 Japan

places 9-16:

Czech Republic 23 - 0 South Korea
Germany 24 - 1 Denmark
New Zealand 18 - 0 Austria
Haudenosaunee 16 - 2 Netherlands

== Semifinals ==
places 1-4:

USA 20 - 3 England
Australia 12 - 10 Canada

places 5-8:

Ireland 15 - 13 Japan
Wales 11 - 8 Scotland

places 9-12:

Czech Republic 12 - 7 Haudenosaunee
Germany 15 - 4 New Zealand

places 13-16:

Netherlands 28 - 1 South Korea
Austria 10 - 9 Denmark

== Finals ==
15th place final:

Denmark 17 - 3 South Korea

13th place final:

Netherlands 14 - 3 Austria

11th place final:

Haudenosaunee 18 - 6 New Zealand

9th place final:

Czech Republic 15 - 5 Germany

7th place final:

Japan 11 - 7 Scotland

5th place final:

Ireland 12 - 7 Wales

3rd place final:

Canada 14 - 9 England

1st place final:

USA v Australia

	1st Half	2nd Half	Final
USA	3	5	8
AUS	3	4	7

== Final ranking ==
Rank	Team
Gold medal	United States
Silver medal	Australia
Bronze medal	Canada
4th	England
5th	Ireland
6th	Wales
7th	Japan
8th	Scotland
9th	Czech Republic
10th	Germany
11th	Haudenosaunee
12th	New Zealand
13th	Netherlands
14th	Austria
15th	Denmark
16th	South Korea

== All-World Team ==
Goalkeeper	Defence	Midfield	Attack
(Australia) Sue McSolvin	(United States) Regina Oliver; (United States) Amber Falcone; (Australia) Sarah Forbes	(United States) Kristen Kjellman; (Australia) Stacey Morlang; (United States) Sarah Albrecht; (Canada) Dana Dobbie; (Wales) Laura Warren	(Australia) Hannah Nielsen; (Australia) Jen Adams; (United States) Lindsey Munday
