= 2001 Women's Lacrosse World Cup =

International lacrosse competition

Tournament details
- Host country: England
- Venue(s): High Wycombe, England
- Dates: July 7–14

Final positions
- Champions: United States (5th title)
- Runners-up: Australia
- Third place: England

The 2001 Women's Lacrosse World Cup was the sixth Women's Lacrosse World Cup and was played in High Wycombe, England from July 7–14, 2001. The United States defeated Australia in the final to win the tournament.

== Results ==
=== Group A ===
Date	Team 1	Team 2	Score
Jul 7	United States	Wales	17-1
Jul 7	Australia	England	9-7
Jul 8	United States	Australia	7-5
Jul 8	England	Wales	13-1
Jul 9	United States	England	11-5
Jul 9	Australia	Wales	26-3

==== Table ====
Pos	Team	Pld	W	D	L	Pts
1	United States	3	3	0	0	6
2	Australia	3	2	0	1	4
3	England	3	1	0	2	2
4	Wales	3	0	0	3	0

=== Group B ===
Date	Team 1	Team 2	Score
Jul 7	Canada	Scotland	11-5
Jul 7	Japan	Germany	12-3
Jul 8	Japan	Scotland	6-5
Jul 8	Canada	Germany	18-2
Jul 9	Canada	Japan	10-6
Jul 9	Scotland	Germany	10-0

==== Table ====
Pos	Team	Pld	W	D	L	Pts
1	Canada	3	3	0	0	6
2	Japan	3	2	0	1	4
3	Scotland	3	1	0	2	2
4	Germany	3	0	0	3	0

=== Quarter-finals (Jul 11) ===
- Canada v Wales 7-5
- United States v Germany 18-0
- Australia v Scotland 19-4
- England v Japan 5-3

=== Semi-finals (Jul 12) ===
- Australia v England 8-2
- United States v Canada 25-2

=== Seventh Place (Jul 13) ===
- Japan v Germany 11-3

=== Fifth Place (Jul 13) ===
- Wales v Scotland 5-2

=== Third Place (Jul 14) ===
- England v Canada 9-4

=== Final (Jul 14) ===
- United States v Australia 14-8

== Final ranking ==
Rank	Team
Gold medal	United States
Silver medal	Australia
Bronze medal	England
4th	Canada
5th	Wales
6th	Scotland
7th	Japan
8th	Germany
