= 1997 Women's Lacrosse World Cup =

International lacrosse competition

Tournament details
- Host country: Japan
- Venue(s): Edogawa, Tokyo, Japan
- Dates: April 27 – May 4

Final positions
- Champions: United States (4th title)
- Runners-up: Australia
- Third place: England

The 1997 Women's Lacrosse World Cup was the fifth Women's Lacrosse World Cup and was played in Edogawa, Tokyo, Japan from 27 April – 4 May 1997. The United States defeated Australia in the final to win the tournament.

== Results ==
=== Group ===
Date	Team 1	Team 2	Score
Apr 27	United States	Australia	4-6
Apr 27	England	Canada	10-4
Apr 27	Wales	Japan	9-6
Apr 28	United States	Wales	13-2
Apr 28	Scotland	Japan	9-4
Apr 28	Australia	Canada	6-0
Apr 29	United States	England	7-5
Apr 29	Wales	Canada	9-8
Apr 29	Australia	Scotland	9-3
Apr 30	Canada	Japan	
Apr 30	England	Scotland	
Apr 30	Australia	Wales	6-5
May 1	United States	Japan	12-2
May 1	Australia	England	3-0
May 1	Scotland	Canada	6-4
May 2	United States	Canada	12-3
May 2	England	Japan	12-2
May 2	Wales	Scotland	9-5
May 3	United States	Scotland	12-3
May 3	Australia	Japan	15-2
May 3	England	Wales	9-2

=== Table ===
Pos	Team	Pld	W	D	L	Pts
1	Australia	6	6	0	0	12
2	United States	6	5	0	1	10
3	England	6	4	0	2	8
4	Wales	6	3	0	3	6
5	Scotland	6	2	0	4	4
6	Canada	6	1	0	5	2
7	Japan	6	0	0	6	0

=== Fifth Place (May 4) ===
- Canada v Scotland 6-5

=== Third Place (May 4) ===
- England v Wales 18-4

=== Final (May 4) ===
- United States v Australia 3-2 (OT)

== Final ranking ==
Rank	Team
Gold medal	United States
Silver medal	Australia
Bronze medal	England
4th	Wales
5th	Canada
6th	Scotland
