= Sarah Forbes (lacrosse) =

Australian lacrosse player and coach

Current position
- Title: Volunteer assistant coach
- Team: Maryland

Biographical details
- Born: 1974 (age 51–52); Australia

Playing career
- 1994–1997: Maryland
- Position: Attack

Accomplishments and honors

Championships
- NCAA Women's Lacrosse National Champion, (1995–1997)

Awards
- NCAA National Offensive Player of the Year (1997) ACC Female Athlete of the Year (1997) National Lacrosse Hall of Fame (2019)

Sarah Forbes is a volunteer women's lacrosse assistant coach at the University of Maryland. Originally from the Wembley Lacrosse Club in Perth, Western Australia, Forbes played for the University of Maryland Terrapins, and won three national championships as a player. She was a three-time All-American, and was named the ACC Female Athlete of the Year in 1997.

In international lacrosse, Forbes represented the Australia women's national lacrosse team at four world championships, including captaining Australia to their second world championship win in 2005, and earning All World team honors in 2005 and 2009 including tournament MVP in 2005.

In 2012 Forbes was elected to the Maryland Terrapins Athletics Hall of Fame. In 2019, she was inducted into the National Lacrosse Hall of Fame.
