= 2017 Asia-Pacific Lacrosse Championship =

International lacrosse competition

Tournament details
- Host country: South Korea
- Venues: 3 (in 3 host cities)
- Dates: June 18–24

The 2017 Asia-Pacific Lacrosse Championships is an international lacrosse competition held in Seogwipo, Jeju Province, South Korea. Both a men's and women's tournament was held in this iteration of the Asia-Pacific Lacrosse Championship.

== Participating teams ==
Men's	Women's
Australia; Japan; Hong Kong; South Korea (hosts); New Zealand; ASPAC United	Australia; China; Japan; Hong Kong; South Korea (hosts); Chinese Taipei

== Venues ==
Seogwipo	2017 Asia-Pacific Lacrosse Championship (South Korea)
Kangchanghak Stadium (Ceremonies)	2017 Asia-Pacific Lacrosse Championship (South Korea)
Geolmae Soccer Field (Men's tournament)	2017 Asia-Pacific Lacrosse Championship (South Korea)
Seogwipo Soccer Park (Women's tournament)	2017 Asia-Pacific Lacrosse Championship (South Korea)

== Men's ==
2017 Asia-Pacific Men's Lacrosse Championship
Tournament details
- Teams: 6

Final positions
- Champions: Japan
- Runners-up: Australia
- Third place: Hong Kong
- Fourth place: South Korea

=== Round robin ===
Pos	Team	Pld	W	L	GF	GA	GD	Qualification
1	Japan	5	5	0	89	15	+74	Final
2	Australia	5	4	1	81	18	+63	Final
3	Hong Kong	5	3	2	58	30	+28	Third place game
4	South Korea (H)	5	2	3	35	52	−17	Third place game
5	China	5	1	4	24	107	−83	Fifth place game
6	Chinese Taipei	5	0	5	17	82	−65	Fifth place game

Source: APLU
(H) Hosts

June 18, 2017	China	2–29	Hong Kong	Geolmae Soccer Field, Seogwipo

Game reference

June 18, 2017	Chinese Taipei	3–11	South Korea	Geolmae Soccer Field, Seogwipo

Game reference

June 18, 2017	Japan	12–8	Australia	Geolmae Soccer Field, Seogwipo

Game reference

June 19, 2017	South Korea	15–6	China	Geolmae Soccer Field, Seogwipo

Game reference

June 19, 2017	Hong Kong	3–13	Japan	Geolmae Soccer Field, Seogwipo

Game reference

June 19, 2017	Australia	24–0	Chinese Taipei	Geolmae Soccer Field, Seogwipo

Game reference

June 20, 2017	Japan	19–3	South Korea	Geolmae Soccer Field, Seogwipo

Game reference

June 20, 2017	Chinese Taipei	11–16	China	Geolmae Soccer Field, Seogwipo

Game reference

June 20, 2017	Hong Kong	4–9	Australia	Geolmae Soccer Field, Seogwipo

Game reference

June 21, 2017	Japan	21–1	Chinese Taipei	Geolmae Soccer Field, Seogwipo

Game reference

June 21, 2017	South Korea	4–12	Hong Kong	Geolmae Soccer Field, Seogwipo

Game reference

June 21, 2017	Australia	28–0	China	Geolmae Soccer Field, Seogwipo

Game reference

June 22, 2017	Hong Kong	10–2	Chinese Taipei	Geolmae Soccer Field, Seogwipo

Game reference

June 22, 2017	South Korea	2–12	Australia	Geolmae Soccer Field, Seogwipo

Game reference

June 22, 2017	China	0–24	Japan	Geolmae Soccer Field, Seogwipo

Game reference

=== Final round ===
==== 5th place game ====
June 23, 2017	China	9–10	Chinese Taipei	Gyeongju Soccer Park, Seogwipo

Game reference

==== 3rd place game ====
June 23, 2017	Hong Kong	8–4	South Korea	Geolmae Soccer Field, Seogwipo

Game reference

==== Final ====
June 24, 2017	Japan	8–6	Australia	Geolmae Soccer Field, Seogwipo

Game reference

== Women's ==
2017 Asia-Pacific Women's Lacrosse Championship
Tournament details
- Teams: 6

Final positions
- Champions: Japan
- Runners-up: Australia
- Third place: New Zealand
- Fourth place: South Korea

=== Round robin ===
Pos	Team	Pld	W	L	GF	GA	GD	Qualification
1	Japan	5	5	0	120	16	+104	Final
2	Australia	5	4	1	68	33	+35	Final
3	South Korea (H)	5	3	2	65	65	0	Third place game
4	New Zealand	5	2	3	56	78	−22	Third place game
5	Hong Kong	5	1	4	39	74	−35	Fifth place game
6	ASPAC United	5	0	5	14	96	−82	Fifth place game

Source: APLU
(H) Hosts

June 18, 2017	ASPAC United	0–29	Japan	Seogwipo Soccer Park, Seogwipo

Game reference

June 18, 2017	South Korea	11–14	Australia	Seogwipo Soccer Park, Seogwipo

Game reference

June 18, 2017	New Zealand	15–10	Hong Kong	Seogwipo Soccer Park, Seogwipo

Game reference

June 19, 2017	Australia	16–1	ASPAC United	Seogwipo Soccer Park, Seogwipo

Game reference

June 19, 2017	Japan	29–3	New Zealand	Seogwipo Soccer Park, Seogwipo

Game reference

June 19, 2017	Hong Kong	9–14	South Korea	Seogwipo Soccer Park, Seogwipo

Game reference

June 20, 2017	New Zealand	7–17	Australia	Seogwipo Soccer Park, Seogwipo

Game reference

June 20, 2017	South Korea	18–5	ASPAC United	Seogwipo Soccer Park, Seogwipo

Game reference

June 20, 2017	Japan	26–3	Hong Kong	Seogwipo Soccer Park, Seogwipo

Game reference

June 21, 2017	New Zealand	13–17	South Korea	Seogwipo Soccer Park, Seogwipo

Game reference

June 21, 2017	Hong Kong	15–3	ASPAC United	Seogwipo Soccer Park, Seogwipo

Game reference

June 21, 2017	Australia	5–12	Japan	Seogwipo Soccer Park, Seogwipo

Game reference

June 22, 2017	ASPAC United	5–18	New Zealand	Seogwipo Soccer Park, Seogwipo

Game reference

June 22, 2017	Australia	16–2	Hong Kong	Seogwipo Soccer Park, Seogwipo

Game reference

June 22, 2017	Japan	24–5	South Korea	Seogwipo Soccer Park, Seogwipo

Game reference

=== Final round ===
==== 5th place game ====
June 23, 2017	Hong Kong	18–5	ASPAC United	Seogwipo Soccer Park, Seogwipo

Game reference

==== 3rd place game ====
June 23, 2017	South Korea	9–12	New Zealand	Seogwipo Soccer Park, Seogwipo

Game reference

==== Final ====
June 24, 2017	Japan	16–6	Australia	Seogwipo Soccer Park, Seogwipo

Game reference
