= Hannah Nielsen =

Australian lacrosse player

Current position
- Title: Head coach
- Team: Michigan
- Conference: Big Ten
- Record: 83–50 (.624)

Biographical details
- Born: 1987 (age 38–39); Adelaide, Australia

Playing career
- 2006–2009: Northwestern
- Position: Midfield

Coaching career (HC unless noted)
- 2010: Penn State (asst.)
- 2011–2012: Towson (asst.)
- 2014–2015: Colorado (asst.)
- 2017: Northwestern (asst.)
- 2018 – present: Michigan

Head coaching record
- Overall: 83–50 (.624)

Accomplishments and honors

Championships
- NCAA Women's Lacrosse National Champions, (2006–2009)

Awards
- Tewaaraton Trophy (2008–2009) Big Ten Suzy Favor Female Athlete of the Year 2008 Honda Sports Award (2008–2009)
Medal record
Representing Australia
Lacrosse sixes
World Games
Bronze medal – third place	2025 Chengdu	Team

Hannah Nielsen (born 28 November 1987 in Adelaide, Australia) is the current head coach of the University of Michigan women's lacrosse team. She was formerly the first women's lacrosse assistant coach at the University of Colorado. Originally from the Brighton Lacrosse Club in Adelaide (also the home club of Jen Adams), Nielsen played for the Northwestern University Wildcats, and won four national championships as a player. She was a three-time All-American, and is a winner of both the Tewaaraton Trophy and Honda Sports Award in her junior and senior seasons. She holds NCAA records for career assists, assists in a season, and assists in single game.

Also a member of the Australia women's national lacrosse team, Nielsen was a member of the Australian U19 team (2003 & 2007) as well as the 2005 World Cup-winning senior team, and was selected as an All-Star player in each of the 2009, 2013, 2017 and 2022 World Cups.

== Head coaching record ==
=== College ===
Record table
Season	Team	Overall	Conference	Standing	Postseason
Michigan Wolverines (Big Ten Conference) (2018–Present)
2018	Michigan	7–10	2–4	5th	
2019	Michigan	16–4	4–2	3rd	NCAA Second Round
2020	Michigan	5–1	0–0	†	†
2021	Michigan	3–9	3–8	7th	
2022	Michigan	11–7	2–4	T–4th	NCAA Second Round
2023	Michigan	12–8	3–3	T–3rd	NCAA Second Round
2024	Michigan	16–4	4–2	T–2nd	NCAA Quarterfinals
2025	Michigan	13–7	5–3	T–3rd	NCAA Second Round
Michigan:		83–50 (.624)	23–26 (.469)		
Total:		83–50 (.624)			
National champion Postseason invitational champion Conference regular season champion Conference regular season and conference tournament champion Division regular season champion Division regular season and conference tournament champion Conference tournament champion

† NCAA cancelled 2020 collegiate activities due to the COVID-19 pandemic
