= 2017 Women's Lacrosse World Cup =

International lacrosse competition

2017 FIL Rathbones Women's Lacrosse World Cup
- Women's Lacrosse World Cup

Tournament details
- Host country: England
- Venue: Surrey Sports Park (in Guildford host cities)
- Dates: 12–22 July 2017
- Teams: 25

Final positions
- Champions: United States (8th title)
- Runners-up: Canada
- Third place: England
- Fourth place: Australia

The 2017 FIL Women's Lacrosse World Cup, the tenth World Cup, is the preeminent international women's lacrosse tournament. The tournament is being held at the Surrey Sports Park in Guildford, Surrey, in the South East of England, with 25 nations competing. Rathbones Investment Management plc committed as the title sponsor for the event in 2014.

== Introduction ==
The 2017 Rathbones Women's Lacrosse World Cup is an official Federation of International Lacrosse (FIL) event and will be organised and managed by the English Lacrosse Association. This tournament was first held in 1982 and is held every four years. This will be the third time that England has hosted the World Cup having previously hosted the tournament in 1982 and 2001.

== Participating nations ==
- Australia
- Belgium
- Canada
- China
- Colombia
- Czech Republic
- England
- Germany
- Haudenosaunee
- Hong Kong
- Ireland
- South Korea
- Latvia
- Mexico
- Netherlands
- New Zealand
- Israel
- Italy
- Japan
- Scotland
- Spain
- Sweden
- Switzerland
- United States
- Wales

== Format ==
The seeding structure for the FIL Rathbones Women’s Lacrosse World Cup has been calculated through use of placing positions from the 2013 World Cup in Canada. Nations who are playing in the World Cup for the first time were placed based on previous results, geographic diversity and their 2016 European Championship placing position.

The pools played a round robin between 12 and 18 July. The top placing teams from Pools B, C, D and E will play off to decide which 2 nations qualify to play in the Championship Division. Pool A members all advance to the Championship Division because it is composed of the top teams, according to World Lacrosse.

The nations were split up to play in the Championship Division (Teams 1-8), Platinum Division (Teams 9-16) and Diamond Division (Teams 17-25).

== Group stage ==
=== Pool A ===
Pos	Team	Pld	W	L	PF	PA	PD	Qualification	(United States)	(Canada)	(Australia)	(England)	(Wales)	(Scotland)
1	United States	5	5	0	86	21	+65	Qualification for Championship Division	—	17–3	—	—	15–6	19–3
2	Canada	5	4	1	46	41	+5	Qualification for Championship Division	—	—	9–5	—	—	16–7
3	Australia	5	3	2	57	34	+23	Qualification for Championship Division	8–15	—	—	13–4	12–4	—
4	England	5	2	3	37	48	−11	Qualification for Championship Division	1–18	6–8	—	—	12–6	—
5	Wales	5	1	4	33	58	−25	Qualification for Championship Division	—	6–10	—	—	—	11–7
6	Scotland	5	0	5	22	79	−57	Qualification for Championship Division	—	—	2–19	3–14	—	—

Source: England Lacrosse

=== Pool B ===
Pos	Team	Pld	W	L	PF	PA	PD	Qualification	(Haudenosaunee)	(Italy)	(South Korea)	(Hong Kong)	(Switzerland)
1	Haudenosaunee	4	4	0	57	23	+34	Qualification for play-in to Championship Division	—	—	17–5	—	18–4
2	Italy	4	3	1	42	36	+6	Qualification for Platinum Division	10–11	—	—	—	9–5
3	South Korea	4	2	2	39	38	+1	Qualification for Platinum Division	—	10–11	—	14–7	—
4	Hong Kong	4	1	3	28	40	−12	Qualification for Diamond Division	4–11	10–12	—	—	—
5	Switzerland	4	0	4	15	44	−29	Qualification for Diamond Division	—	—	3–10	3–7	—

Source: England Lacrosse

=== Pool C ===
Pos	Team	Pld	W	L	PF	PA	PD	Qualification	(Israel)	(Czech Republic)	(Netherlands)	(Belgium)	(China)
1	Israel	4	4	0	69	11	+58	Qualification for play-in to Championship Division	—	—	17–3	18–0	—
2	Czech Republic	4	3	1	67	22	+45	Qualification for Platinum Division	8–16	—	—	—	30–1
3	Netherlands	4	2	2	48	35	+13	Qualification for Platinum Division	—	4–10	—	—	21–1
4	Belgium	4	1	3	27	62	−35	Qualification for Diamond Division	—	1–21	9–20	—	—
5	China	4	0	4	5	86	−81	Qualification for Diamond Division	0–18	—	—	3–17	—

First match(es) will be played: 12 July 2017. Source: England Lacrosse

=== Pool D ===
Pos	Team	Pld	W	L	PF	PA	PD	Qualification	(Japan)	(Germany)	(Latvia)	(Mexico)	(Spain)
1	Japan	4	4	0	86	11	+75	Qualification for play-in to Championship Division	—	10–9	—	27–1	—
2	Germany	4	3	1	53	17	+36	Qualification for Platinum Division	—	—	11–3	—	17–3
3	Latvia	4	2	2	19	45	−26	Qualification for Platinum Division	0–22	—	—	—	9–6
4	Mexico	4	1	3	16	57	−41	Qualification for Diamond Division	—	1–16	6–7	—	—
5	Spain	4	0	4	17	61	−44	Qualification for Diamond Division	1–27	—	—	7–8	—

Source: England Lacrosse

=== Pool E ===
Pos	Team	Pld	W	L	PF	PA	PD	Qualification	(New Zealand)	(Republic of Ireland)	(Sweden)	(Colombia)
1	New Zealand	3	3	0	52	9	+43	Qualification for play-in to Championship Division	—	—	—	21–0
2	Ireland	3	2	1	43	15	+28	Qualification for Platinum Division	5–10	—	20–2	18–3
3	Sweden	3	1	2	20	43	−23	Qualification for Platinum Division	4–21	—	—	14–2
4	Colombia	3	0	3	5	53	−48	Qualification for Diamond Division	—	—	—	—

Source: England Lacrosse

== Championship Division ==
Play-in
18 July
Israel (OT)	8
Japan	7
18 July
Haudenosaunee	2
New Zealand	9

Quarter-finals
19 July
United States	20
Israel	3
19 July
England	9
Wales	5
19 July
Canada	16
New Zealand	1
19 July
Australia	21
Scotland	6

Semi-finals
20 July
United States	19
England	8
20 July
Canada (OT)	8
Australia	6

Final
22 July
United States	10
Canada	5
Third place
22 July
England (OT)	10
Australia	9

=== Consolation bracket ===
Semifinal
20 July
Israel (OT)	8
Wales	7
20 July
New Zealand	5
Scotland	7

5th position game
21 July
Israel	13
Scotland	17
7th position game
21 July
Wales	11
New Zealand	5

== Platinum Division ==
Platinum Division will define positions 9 to 16.

Play-in 3
Italy	12
Ireland	13

Play-in 4
Czech Republic	4
Germany	7

Play-in 5
Sweden	9
South Korea	14

Play-in 6
Netherlands	12
Latvia	4

Quarter-finals
19 July
Japan	12
South Korea	4
19 July
Germany	11
Italy	12
19 July
Haudenosaunee	19
Netherlands	11
19 July
(Republic of Ireland) Ireland	6
Czech Republic	9

Semi-finals
20 July
Japan	16
Italy	6
20 July
Haudenosaunee	6
Czech Republic	18

9th position game
21 July
Japan	10
Czech Republic	7
11th position game
21 July
Haudenosaunee	17
Italy	18

=== Consolation bracket ===
Semifinal
20 July
South Korea	1
Germany	18
20 July
Netherlands	1
(Republic of Ireland) Ireland	13

13th position game
21 July
Germany	8
(Republic of Ireland) Ireland	14
15th position game
21 July
South Korea	8
Netherlands	6

== Diamond Division ==
Diamond Division will define positions 17 to 25.

Play-in 7
Belgium	8
Mexico	12

Play-in 9
Spain	16
China	4

Play-in 10
Hong Kong	20
Colombia	0

Quarter-finals
19 July
Colombia	3
Mexico	10
19 July
Latvia	5
Spain	4
19 July
Hong Kong	14
Belgium	8
19 July
Switzerland	12
Sweden	1

Semi-finals
20 July
Mexico	9
Latvia	13
20 July
Hong Kong (OT)	5
Switzerland	4

17th position game
21 July
Latvia	10
Hong Kong	9
19th position game
21 July
Mexico	4
Switzerland	15

=== Consolation bracket ===
Semifinal
20 July
Colombia	6
China	8
20 July†
Belgium	6
Sweden (OT)	7

21st position game
21 July
China	4
Sweden	19
23rd position game
21 July
Spain	13
Colombia	5

†Loser of game places 25th

== Final ranking ==
Rank	Team	Record
Gold medal	United States	8–0
Silver medal	Canada	6–2
Bronze medal	England	4–4
4th	Australia	4–4
5th	Scotland	2–6
6th	Israel	6–2
7th	Wales	2–6
8th	New Zealand	4–3
9th	Japan	7–1
10th	Czech Republic	5–3
11th	Italy	5–3
12th	Haudenosaunee	5–3
13th	(Republic of Ireland) Ireland	5–2
14th	Germany	5–3
15th	South Korea	4–4
16th	Netherlands	3–5
17th	Latvia	5–3
18th	Hong Kong	4–4
19th	Switzerland	2–5
20th	Mexico	3–5
21st	Sweden	3–4
22nd	China	1–6
23rd	Spain	2–5
24th	Colombia	0–7
25th	Belgium	1–6

== All-World Team ==
(United States) Allyson Carey
(United States) Taylor Cummings
(Canada) Dana Dobbie
(Canada) Katie Donohoe
(United States) Megan Douty
(Canada) Erica Evans
(England) Laura Merrifield
(Australia) Hannah Nielsen
(United States) Jen Russell
(United States) Kayla Treanor
(United States) Michelle Tumolo
(United States) Devon Wills
