= Jamaica women's national lacrosse team =

Women's national lacrosse team of Jamaica

Jamaica
- Association: Jamaica Lacrosse Association
- Confederation: PALA (Americas)

Women's World Championship
- Appearances: 1 (first in 2022)
- Best result: 28th place (2022)
- Website: jamaicalacrosse.net

The Jamaica women's national lacrosse team is the national team that represents Jamaica in international lacrosse competitions. It is governed by the Jamaica Lacrosse Association.

== History ==
The Jamaica Lacrosse Association (JLA) was established in April 2013 and October the same year the JLA became a member of then-Federation of International Lacrosse (later renamed as World Lacrosse).

The JLA's first involvement in international women's lacrosse was the 2019 FIL Women's U-19 World Lacrosse Championship in Canada for which the federation had to conduct a fund raiser. The team was a product of the JLA's high school program launched in 2013.

The Jamaica senior women's lacrosse team took part at the Pan-American Lacrosse Association (PALA) Qualifier in November 2019. Finishing third, they qualified for the 2022 World Lacrosse Women's Championship in Towson, Maryland.

At the 2025 Pan-American Women's Lacrosse Championship in Auburndale, Florida, Jamaica finished seventh place. They did not earn one of the five Americas berth for the 2026 Women's Championship in Tokyo, Japan.

== Competitive record ==
=== World Lacrosse Championship ===
Year	Host	GP	W	L	GF	GA	Finish
2022	United States	6	0	6	35	74	28th
2026	Japan	Did not qualify					
Total	−	6	0	6	35	74	No medal

=== Pan-American Championship ===
Year	Host	GP	W	L	GF	GA	Finish
2025	United States	5	1	4	37	69	7th
Total	−	5	1	4	37	69	No medal
