= 1993 Women's Lacrosse World Cup =

International lacrosse competition

Tournament details
- Host country: Scotland
- Venue(s): Heriot-Watt University, Edinburgh, Scotland
- Dates: August 7–14

Final positions
- Champions: United States (3rd title)
- Runners-up: England
- Third place: Australia

The 1993 Women's Lacrosse World Cup was the fourth Women's Lacrosse World Cup and was played at Heriot-Watt University in Edinburgh, Scotland from 7–14 August 1993. The United States defeated England in the final to win the tournament.

== Results ==
=== Group A ===
Date	Team 1	Team 2	Score
Aug 7	United States	Canada	14-0
Aug 7	Scotland	Japan	13-5
Aug 8	United States	Japan	19-2
Aug 8	Scotland	Canada	7-7
Aug 9	United States	Scotland	15-1
Aug 9	Canada	Japan	13-4

==== Table ====
Pos	Team	Pld	W	D	L	GF	GA	GD	Pts
1	United States	3	3	0	0	48	3	+45	6
2	Canada	3	1	1	1	20	25	−5	3
3	Scotland	3	1	1	1	21	27	−6	3
4	Japan	3	0	0	3	11	45	−34	0

=== Group B ===
Date	Team 1	Team 2	Score
Aug 7	England	Australia	5-4
Aug 7	Wales	Czech Republic	
Aug 8	England	Czech Republic	25-0
Aug 8	Wales	Australia	2-14
Aug 9	Australia	Czech Republic	
Aug 9	England	Wales	12-0

==== Table ====
Pos	Team	Pld	W	D	L	GF	GA	GD	Pts
1	England	3	3	0	0	42	4	+38	6
2	Australia	3	2	0	1	–	–	—	4
3	Wales	3	1	0	2	–	–	—	2
4	Czech Republic	3	0	0	3	–	–	—	0

=== Quarter-finals (Aug 11) ===
- United States v Czech Republic 17-2
- England v Japan 23-1
- Australia v Scotland 12-2
- Canada v Wales 7-6

=== Semi-finals (Aug 12) ===
- United States v Australia 6-5
- England v Canada 8-2

=== Third Place (Aug 14) ===
- Australia v Canada 4-3

=== Final (Aug 14) ===
- United States v England 3-1

== Final ranking ==
Rank	Team
Gold medal	United States
Silver medal	England
Bronze medal	Australia
4th	Canada
