= World Lacrosse Women's Championship Division II =

- Most recent season or competition: 2026 World Lacrosse Women's Championship Division II
- Sport: Lacrosse
- Founded: 2026
- No. of teams: 12

The World Lacrosse Women's Championship Division II is the second and below division tournament for the World Lacrosse Women's Championship.

== Results ==
Year	First place	Second place	Third place	Fourth place
2026	Italy	Mexico	New Zealand	South Korea
