= Lindsey Munday =

American lacrosse player

Lindsey Munday (born May 28, 1984) is a former collegiate women's lacrosse player who won two national championships at Northwestern and has served since 2013 as the inaugural head coach of the USC Trojans women's lacrosse team.

Munday was raised in Mountain Lakes, New Jersey and graduated from Mountain Lakes High School in 2002, where she played basketball and soccer, as well as lacrosse. She was inducted into the school's hall of fame in 2018.

As a member of the Northwestern Wildcats women's lacrosse team, Munday was part of the team that won the 2005 NCAA Division I Women's Lacrosse Championship and was chosen as a member of the all-tournament team. She was also a part of the 2006 NCAA title. She graduated from Northwestern with a bachelor's degree in communications in 2006.

She was a member of the gold medal-winning U.S. team at the 2009 Women's Lacrosse World Cup and was part of the U.S. team that won the 2013 Women's Lacrosse World Cup, where she was chosen to the All-World Team. Lacrosse Magazine chose Munday as its person of the year in 2013.

She spent four years as an assistant coach at her alma mater and one season as head coach for the Mount St. Mary's Mountaineers women's lacrosse team. She was selected in 2011 as the inaugural coach of the USC Trojans women's lacrosse team, a program that played its first game in February 2013 at Los Angeles Memorial Coliseum, losing to Northwestern. Her USC team has a record of 151–63 overall record, which includes 82–20 record in league competition.

She has been a resident of Manhattan Beach, California.
