= Canada women's national lacrosse team =

Lacrosse team

Canada
- Association: Lacrosse Canada
- Head coach: Scott Teeter; Allison Daley

Women's World Championship
- Appearances: 12 (first in 1982)
- Best result: Runners-up (2013, 2017, 2022, 2026)
- Website: lacrosse.ca

The Canadian women's national lacrosse team represents Canada in women's international lacrosse competitions. The team is governed by the Canadian Lacrosse Association, which is a member of World Lacrosse, the international governing body for lacrosse.

== History ==
The first Canadian women's national lacrosse team was formed for the 1982 Women's Lacrosse World Cup in Nottingham, England. Formed from box lacrosse players, Canada entered the tournament as the sole team which have not played an international game yet. The team coached by Courtney Solenberger finished as bronze medalists, at the expense of Scotland.

The team have competed in all editions of the World Cup (later renamed the World Championship). They repeated their bronze medal finish in 2009 and have finished as runners-up in the last three editions in 2013, 2017, and 2022.

At the 2017 World Games in Poland, the only edition where regular field lacrosse was played, Canada finished as silver medalists in the women's lacrosse tournament losing to the United States in the final.

== Competition achievements ==
=== World Championship ===
| Year | Location | Result |
|---|---|---|
| 1982 | Nottingham, England | Bronze |
| 1984 | Swarthmore, United States | 4th |
| 1989 | Perth, Australia | 4th |
| 1993 | Edinburgh, Scotland | 4th |
| 1997 | Tokyo, Japan | 5th |
| 2001 | High Wycombe, England | 4th |
| 2005 | Annapolis, United States | 4th |
| 2009 | Prague, Czech Republic | Bronze |
| 2013 | Oshawa, Canada | Silver |
| 2017 | Guildford, England | Silver |
| 2022 | Towson, United States | Silver |
| 2026 | Tokyo, Japan | Silver |

=== World Games ===
| Year | Location | Results |
|---|---|---|
| 2017 | Wrocław, Poland | Silver |

== Head coaches ==
- (Canada) Scott Teeter (2026–present)
- (Canada) Allison Daley (2026–present)
