= Great Britain women's national lacrosse team =

National sports team

Great Britain
- Association: British Lacrosse

First international
- United States 5–15 Great Britain (United Kingdom) (24 April 1954; New York, United States)

Biggest win
- United States 3–15 Great Britain (United Kingdom) (1960; United States)

Biggest defeat
- United States 18–5 Great Britain (United Kingdom) (29 July 2017; Wrocław, Poland)

Last international
- (United Kingdom) Great Britain 8–10 Australia (29 July 2017; Wrocław, Poland)

A Great Britain women's national lacrosse team has competed in the 2017 World Games, the only edition where lacrosse was held in its standard format. The team was also active from 1954 to 1985.

== History ==
From March to June 1954, a Great Britain national team consisting of women entrepreneurs toured the United States to promote lacrosse. They played two games against the United States; they won 15–5 against the "1953 team" in New York City which was followed suit by a 8–4 win against the "1954 team" in Philadelphia. The United States returned the favor by visiting the United Kingdom in 1957. A two month tour was conducted by Great Britain in 1960.

Great Britain began touring with Australia in 1969, and became a frequent opponent from 1972. In 1985, Great Britain conducted a tour in Australia and played a five-game series. The team was disbanded after.

A unified Great Britain women's team was briefly formed again for the 2017 World Games. The team finished fourth. The next edition, the 2017 World Games adopted the lacrosse sixes format.

== Competition achievements ==
=== World Games ===
World Games record
Year	Result	Matches	Wins	Draws	Losses	PF	PA
(Poland) 2017	4th place	4	1	0	3	28	47
2022–present	Lacrosse sixes event						
Total	1/1	4	1	0	3	28	47
