= Vivien Jones =

Personal information
- Born: Vivien Webb; 21 June 1951; Glasgow, Scotland
- Died: 26 December 2010 (aged 59)

Sport
- Country: UK
- Sport: Lacrosse

Vivien Jones (21 June 1951 – 26 December 2010) was a lacrosse player who made the highest number of appearances for a women's international team.

== Early life ==
She was born Vivien Webb in Glasgow and moved with her parents and three sisters to London. She won a scholarship to The Lady Eleanor Holles School, learning to play lacrosse there, before gaining a degree in teaching at St. Mary's College, Twickenham.

== Clubs ==
From 1970 to 1998, Jones played for Putney, and afterwards for Centaurs.

== County ==
From 1976 to 1997, Jones played for Middlesex.

== Region ==
From 1997 to 2003, Jones played for the South in the annual All England territorial tournament.

== International ==
From 1977 to 2001, Jones played 97 times for Wales, including six editions of the Women's Lacrosse World Cup from the inaugural edition in 1982 to 2001, being eligible for Scotland by birth, Wales by marriage and England by residence, after Scotland's selectors regarded her as possibly too old. She also played nine times for the Celts, and twice for Great Britain. The 108 caps are recognised as being the highest for women's lacrosse by Guinness World Records.

In the late 1990s, she played for Wales alongside her daughter Sara, and this was reported in The Times in 1996. Jones was one of only four players who took part in all of the first five editions of the Women's Lacrosse World Cup, the other three being Lois Richardson of England, and Sue Sofanos and Marge Barlow, both of Australia.

== Personal life ==
Vivien Webb married Graham Jones. The couple had two daughters, Sara and Nicola. She taught physical education for fifteen years, and her alma mater, Lady Eleanor Holles School, was among the schools at which she taught. Afterwards, she worked for fifteen years at British Airways until 2005, and also worked at Rank Hovis McDougall until 2007.

== Illness and death ==
After being treated for breast cancer by initial surgery and extensive radio and chemotherapy in the early 2000s, she continued to play, and to coach and select at school, territorial and international level until 2010. Jones died of breast cancer on 26 December 2010.

== Awards ==
In 1999, she was recognised as a Legend of Lacrosse by the International Federation of Women's Lacrosse Associations.
