= 2013 Women's Lacrosse World Cup =

International lacrosse competition

2013 FIL Women's Lacrosse World Cup
- Women's Lacrosse World Cup

Tournament details
- Host country: Canada
- Venue: 1 (in 1 host city)
- Dates: 10–19 July
- Teams: 19

Final positions
- Champions: United States (7th title)
- Runners-up: Canada
- Third place: Australia
- Fourth place: England

Tournament statistics
- Scoring leader(s): Katrina Dowd (26)

The 2013 Women's Lacrosse World Cup, the ninth World Cup played, is the pre-eminent international women's lacrosse tournament. The tournament was held at the Civic Recreation Complex in Oshawa, Ontario, Canada from July 10 through July 20, 2013.

== Sponsoring organizations ==
The event was sponsored by the Federation of International Lacrosse (FIL) and the Ontario Trillium Foundation. The tournament was first held in 1982 and has been held quadrennially on odd years since 1989.

== Teams ==
Nineteen teams, the most ever, competed in the 2013 World Cup tournament. New entries included Finland, Hong Kong, Israel, South Korea, and Latvia. The Czech Republic and Denmark did not return from the 2009 World Cup.

== Championship ==
Following Pool play, teams were seeded into a Championship Bracket of 12 teams and a Diamond Consolation Bracket of 7 teams. The Championship Bracket consisted of the teams in Pool A, the top 2 teams in Pools B, C and D and the next highest ranked team. The seven remaining teams were placed in the Diamond Consolation Bracket and re-seeded into two new pools, X and Y, based on rankings and teams previously played in the pool play.

The United States team dominated pool and bracket play, ending the tournament with a perfect 7-0 record. USA faced Canada in the gold medal game and won with a final score of 19-5 to earn its seventh world title. Australia and England faced each other in the bronze medal game, with Australia defeating England 12-6.

=== Pool Play ===
Teams are divided into four pools, A-D. Pool play games will be played on July 11 through 16.

Team earned an automatic quarterfinal berth in the Championship Bracket
Team earned a berth in the Championship Bracket
Team advanced to Diamond Consolation Bracket

==== Pool A ====
All 5 teams guaranteed a berth into Championship Bracket, Top 4 receive Bye to Quarterfinal.

Pos	Team	Pld	W	L	GF	GA	GD
1	United States	4	4	0	0	0	0
2	Canada	4	3	1	0	0	0
3	Australia	4	2	2	0	0	0
4	England	4	1	3	0	0	0
5	Wales	4	0	4	0	0	0

==== Pool B ====
Top 2 teams advance to Championship Bracket, 3rd place eligible based on record.

Pos	Team	Pld	W	L	GF	GA	GD
1	New Zealand	5	4	1	0	0	0
2	(Republic of Ireland) Ireland	5	3	2	0	0	0
3	Netherlands	5	2	3	0	0	0
4	Finland	5	2	3	0	0	0
5	Latvia	5	0	5	0	0	0

==== Pool C ====
Top 2 teams advance to Championship Bracket, 3rd place eligible based on record. Austria advances as best of the 3rd place teams.

Pos	Team	Pld	W	L	GF	GA	GD
1	Japan	5	5	0	0	0	0
2	Haudenosaunee	5	4	1	0	0	0
3	Austria	5	3	2	0	0	0
4	Hong Kong	5	1	4	0	0	0
5	Sweden	5	0	5	0	0	0

==== Pool D ====
Top 2 teams advance to Championship Bracket, 3rd place eligible based on record.

Pos	Team	Pld	W	L	GF	GA	GD
1	Israel	5	4	1	0	0	0
2	Scotland	5	4	1	0	0	0
3	Germany	5	2	3	0	0	0
4	(South Korea) Korea	5	1	4	0	0	0

=== Diamond Consolation Bracket ===
Pool X: 13th-15th Place

17 July:

- Netherlands 11–10 Finland

18 July:

- Germany 18–3 Finland

19 July:

- Germany 21–2 Netherlands

Germany progresses to 12th place play-off game. Finland relegated to 15th place play-off game.

Pool Y: 16th-19th Place

17 July:

- South Korea 23–7 Sweden
- Latvia 12–11 Hong Kong

18 July:

- South Korea 23–7 Hong Kong
- Latvia 10–6 Sweden

19 July:

- Hong Kong 15–5 Sweden
- South Korea 7–5 Latvia

South Korea progresses to 15th place play-off game.

=== Championship Bracket ===
Round 1 (17 July)

- (8) Haudenosaunee 19–3 (Republic of Ireland) Ireland (9)
- (5) Wales 21–0 Austria (12)
- (11) Scotland 13–12 Japan (6)
- (10) Israel 12–9 New Zealand (7)

Quarterfinals (18 July)

- (1) United States 20–1 Haudenosaunee (8)
- (4) England 10–0 Wales (5)
- (3) Australia 26–2 Scotland (11)
- (2) Canada 17–5 Israel (10)

Semi-finals

1st-4th Place (19 July):

- (1) United States 21–8 England (4)
- (2) Canada 11–7 Australia (3)

5th-8th Place (19 July):

- (5) Wales 15–14 Haudenosaunee (8)
- (11) Scotland 9–7 Israel (10)

9th-12th Place (18 July):

- (9) Ireland (Republic of Ireland) 10–4 Austria (12)
- (6) Japan 23–4 New Zealand (7)

=== Finals ===
15th-place match (19 July):

- South Korea 7–5 Finland

12th-place match (20 July):

- Germany 14–6 Austria (12)

11th-place match (19 July):

- (7) New Zealand 20–5 Austria (12)

9th-place match (20 July):

- (6) Japan 25–4 (Republic of Ireland) Ireland (9)

7th-place match (20 July):

- (8) Haudenosaunee 1–0* Israel (10) (Israel forfeited.)

5th-place match (20 July):

- (5) Wales 8–4 Scotland (11)

Bronze-medal match (20 July):

- (3) Australia 12–6 England (4)

Gold-medal match (20 July):

- (1) United States 19–5 Canada (2)

Gold Medal Final
Team	1st Half	2nd Half	Final score
USA	14	5	19
CAN	2	3	5

== Final rankings ==
2013 World Cup Final Rankings
Rank	Country	2009 WC Rank	Change
Gold medal	United States	1	
Silver medal	Canada	3	▲
Bronze medal	Australia	2	▼
4	England	4	
5	Wales	6	▲
6	Scotland	8	▲
7	Haudenosaunee	11	▲
8	Israel	did not play	
9	Japan	7	▼
10	(Republic of Ireland) Ireland	5	▼
11	New Zealand	12	▲
12	Germany	10	▼
13	Austria	14	▲
14	Netherlands	13	▼
15	South Korea	16	▲
16	Finland	did not play	
17	Latvia	did not play	
18	Hong Kong	did not play	
19	Sweden	did not play	
did not play	Czech Republic	9	
did not play	Denmark	15	

== All-World Team ==
(United States) Sarah Albrecht
(Canada) Dana Dobbie
(United States) Katrina Dowd
(United States) Amber Falcone
(Canada) Katie Guy
(England) Laura Merrifield
(Australia) Stacey Morlang Sullivan
(United States) Lindsey Munday
(Australia) Hannah Nielsen
(United States) Katie Rowan
(Australia) Alicia Wickens
(United States) Devon Wills
