= Great Britain men's national lacrosse team =

National sports team

Great Britain
- Association: N/A

First international
- (United Kingdom) Great Britain 1–12 Canada (1883)

Biggest win
- (United Kingdom) Great Britain 5–3 United States (1884; Belfast, Northern Ireland)

Biggest defeat
- (United Kingdom) Great Britain 1–12 Canada (1883)

Last international
- (United Kingdom) Great Britain 5–5 United States (1948; London, England)
Medal record
Olympic Games
Silver medal – second place	1908 London	Team

A Great Britain men's national lacrosse team historically competed in the Summer Olympics in 1908 when the sport was a medal event; and in 1928 and 1948 when it was a demonstration sport.

== History ==
The very first Great Britain lacrosse team played in 1883 against Canada. They lost 1–12.

Great Britain played Canada in the 1908 Summer Olympics when traditional lacrosse was last organized as a regular event. Great Britain fielded a team again in the 1928 and 1948 Summer Olympics when lacrosse was a demonstration event.

A Great Britain lacrosse sixes team was created for the 2022 World Games but the format was used. The 2028 Summer Olympics will also use the lacrosse sixes

== Competition achievements ==
=== Olympic Games ===
Olympic Games record
Year	Result	Matches	Wins	Draws	Losses	PF	PA
(United States) 1904	Did not participate						
(United Kingdom) 1908	Silver medal	1	0	0	1	10	14
(Netherlands) 1928	Demonstration	2	1	0	1	12	15
(United States) 1932	Did not participate						
(United Kingdom) 1948	Demonstration	1	0	1	0	5	5
(United States) 2028	Lacrosse sixes event (see detail)						
Total	1/3	4	1	1	2	17	34

== Fixtures and results ==
Exhibition games

1883	Great Britain	1−12	Canada

Game reference

1884	Great Britain	5−3	United States	Belfast

Game reference

1908 Summer Olympics

24 October 1908	Great Britain	10−14	Canada	White City Stadium, London

Game reference

1928 Summer Olympics

6 August 1928	Great Britain	7−6	United States	Amsterdam

Game reference

7 August 1928	Canada	9−5	Great Britain	Amsterdam

Game reference

1948 Summer Olympics

1948	Great Britain	5−5	United States	Wembley Stadium, London

Game reference
