= 1986 Women's Lacrosse World Cup =

1986 Lacrosse World Cup, USA

1986 Brine Women's Lacrosse World Cup
Tournament details
- Host country: United States
- Venue(s): Swarthmore College, Swarthmore, Pennsylvania
- Dates: 14–21 June

Final positions
- Champions: Australia (1st title)
- Runners-up: United States
- Third place: Scotland

The 1986 Women's Lacrosse World Cup was the second Women's Lacrosse World Cup and was played at Swarthmore College, Swarthmore, Pennsylvania from June 14–21, 1986. Australia defeated United States in the final to win the tournament. The tournament was sponsored by Brine.

== Results ==
Date	Team 1	Team 2	Score
Jun 14	England	Scotland	6-7
Jun 14	Australia	Wales	11-1
Jun 14	United States	Canada	6-3
Jun 15	Wales	Scotland	4-10
Jun 15	United States	England	8-5
Jun 15	Canada	Australia	
Jun 16	England	Wales	5-1
Jun 16	Australia	United States	4-3
Jun 16	Canada	Scotland	3-3
Jun 18	Wales	United States	1-21
Jun 18	Australia	Scotland	6-0
Jun 18	England	Canada	2-3
Jun 19	England	Australia	
Jun 19	Wales	Canada	
Jun 19	United States	Scotland	11-2

== Table ==
Pos	Team	Pld	W	D	L	Pts
1	Australia	5	5	0	0	10
2	United States	5	4	0	1	8
3	Scotland	5	2	1	2	5
4	Canada	5	2	1	2	5
5	England	5	1	0	4	2
6	Wales	5	0	0	5	0

== Fifth Place Play Off (June 21) ==
- England v Wales 18-2

== Third Place Play Off (June 21) ==
- Scotland v Canada 7-5

== Final (June 21) ==
- Australia v United States 10-7
