= Madison Taylor =

Madison Taylor may refer to:

- Madison Taylor, British singer and model who participated in Star for a Night and Eurovision Song Contest 2004
- The Cardcaptors name for the Cardcaptor Sakura character Tomoyo Daidouji

== See also ==
- James Madison Taylor, early settler of southeastern Idaho, U.S.A.
