= 2005 Women's Lacrosse World Cup =

International lacrosse competition

Tournament details
- Host country: United States
- Venue(s): Annapolis, Maryland
- Dates: 23 June – 2 July

Final positions
- Champions: Australia (2nd title)
- Runners-up: United States
- Third place: England

The 2005 Women's Lacrosse World Cup was the seventh Women's Lacrosse World Cup and was played in Annapolis, Maryland from 23 June – 2 July, 2005. Australia defeated the United States in the final to win the tournament.

== Results ==
=== Group A ===
Team 1	Team 2	Score
United States	England	13-5
Australia	Wales	18-3
United States	Wales	11-4
England	Canada	11-6
Wales	Canada	5-12
United States	Canada	15-7
England	Australia	4-15
United States	Australia	7-7
England	Wales	6-2
Australia	Canada	17-2

==== Table ====
Pos	Team	Pld	W	D	L	Pts
1	Australia	4	3	1	0	7
2	United States	4	3	1	0	7
3	England	4	2	0	2	4
4	Canada	4	1	0	3	2
5	Wales	4	0	0	4	0

=== Group B ===
Team 1	Team 2	Score
Japan	Scotland	19-6
Germany	Czech Republic	9-6
Scotland	Zealand	23-0
Germany	New Zealand	15-1
Japan	New Zealand	26-1
Scotland	Czech Republic	14-2
Czech Republic	New Zealand	21-6
Japan	Germany	17-2
Japan	Czech Republic	12-1
Scotland	Germany	19-3

==== Table ====
Pos	Team	Pld	W	D	L	Pts
1	Japan	4	4	0	0	8
2	Scotland	4	3	0	1	6
3	Germany	4	2	0	2	4
4	Czech Republic	4	1	0	3	2
5	New Zealand	4	0	0	4	0

=== Classification Play Offs (June 28) ===
- Canada v Scotland 17–7
- United States v Czech Republic 20–1
- Australia v New Zealand 22–0
- England v Germany 22–0
- Japan v Wales 12–8

=== Knockout Play Offs (June 29) ===
- Czech Republic v Germany 4–2
- Scotland v New Zealand 18–4

=== Quarter-finals (June 30) ===
- Canada v Japan 13–11
- United States v Scotland 23–0
- Australia v Czech Republic 26–2
- England v Wales 6–5

=== Semi-finals (Jul 1) ===
- Australia v Canada 22–7
- United States v England 13–3

=== Fifth Place (Jul 2) ===
- Japan v Wales 12–8

=== Third Place (Jul 2) ===
- England v Canada 11–8

=== Final (Jul 2) ===
- Australia v United States 14-7

== All-World Team ==
Goalkeeper	Defence	Midfield	Attack
(United States) Jessica Wilk	(United States) Joanne Connelly; (Australia) Sarah Forbes; (England) Alex Harle	(Australia) Jen Adams; (United States) Quinn Carney; (United States) Kelly Amonte Hiller; (Australia) Sonia Judd; (Australia) Stacey Morlang	(Canada) Jen Johnson; (Japan) Akiko Wada; (Wales) Laura Warren
