= Australia women's national lacrosse team =

Australia
- WL membership: 1972
- Association: Lacrosse Australia
- Confederation: APLU (Asia-Pacific)
- Head coach: Sarah Forbes

Women's World Championship
- Appearances: 12 (first in 1982)
- Best result: Champions (1986, 2005)
- Website: www.lacrosse.com.au
Medal record
Women's World Championship
Gold medal – first place	1986 United States
Gold medal – first place	2005 United States
Silver medal – second place	1982 England
Silver medal – second place	1997 Japan
Silver medal – second place	2001 England
Silver medal – second place	2009 Czech Republic
Bronze medal – third place	1989 Australia
Bronze medal – third place	1993 Scotland
Bronze medal – third place	2013 Canada
The World Games
Bronze medal – third place	2017 Poland
Bronze medal – third place	2022 United States

The Australia women's national lacrosse team represents Australia at women's lacrosse. It is governed by Lacrosse Australia and is a full member of the World Lacrosse. They have won the Women's Lacrosse World Cup twice, in 1986 and 2005, and have been runners-up 4 times. They are currently ranked fourth in the world, finishing behind the United States, Canada and England at the 2017 FIL Women's Lacrosse World Cup, which was held in Guildford, Surrey, England, while also finishing third in the 2017 World Games women's lacrosse tournament, held in Wrocław, Poland, behind the United States and Canada, but ahead of Great Britain.

== Squad ==
Australia senior women's national lacrosse team 2017
Number	Name	Club	State
17	Rebecca Banyard	Wembley	WA
1	Abbie Burgess	Footscray	Vic
18	Verity Clough	Footscray	Vic
20	Elizabeth Hinkes	Wembley	WA
16	Ashtyn Hiron	Phoenix	WA
2	Courtney Hobbs	Glenelg	SA
21	Lauren Hunter	Williamstown	Vic
24	Bree Hussey	Newport	Vic
4	Stella Justice-Allen	Footscray	Vic
5	Rachel Kirchheimer	Newport	Vic
12	Theadora Kwas	Footscray	Vic
3	Rebecca Lane	Footscray	Vic
23	Stephanie McNamara	Newport	Vic
9	Sarah Mollison	Footscray	Vic
7	Hannah Nielsen	Brighton	SA
19	Beth Varga	Brighton	SA
6	Bonnie Wells	Glenelg	SA
8	Sachiyo Yamada	Caulfield	Vic
alternates
11	Sarah Lowe	Burnside	SA
selected but withdrew through injury
14	Sue McSolvin	Caulfield	Vic
10	Hayley Sofarnos	Newport	Vic
Team Personnel
head	Trish Adams		
asst	Meredith Carre		
manager	Kate Simpson		
medical officer	Megan Barnet		
physiotherapist	Cara Gleeson		
myotherapist	Kiara DiPierto		
strength and conditioning	James Hooper		
photography	Erin Gregory		

== U-19 Team ==
The Australian U19 women's national lacrosse team won the gold medal at the 1995 Under-19 World Lacrosse Championship.

As of 2019, their head coach has been Jen Adams.
