= United States women's national lacrosse team =

National sports team

United States
- Association: USA Lacrosse
- Head coach: Acacia Walker-Weinstein

Women's World Championship
- Appearances: 12 (first in 1982)
- Best result: Gold: (1982, 1989, 1993, 1997, 2001, 2009, 2013, 2017, 2022, 2026)
Medal record
Women's World Championship
| Gold medal – first place | 1982 England | Team |
| Gold medal – first place | 1989 Australia | Team |
| Gold medal – first place | 1993 Scotland | Team |
| Gold medal – first place | 1997 Japan | Team |
| Gold medal – first place | 2001 England | Team |
| Gold medal – first place | 2009 Czech Republic | Team |
| Gold medal – first place | 2013 Canada | Team |
| Gold medal – first place | 2017 England | Team |
| Gold medal – first place | 2022 Maryland | Team |
| Gold medal – first place | 2026 Tokyo | Team |
| Silver medal – second place | 1986 United States | Team |
| Silver medal – second place | 2005 United States | Team |
World Games
| Gold medal – first place | 2017 Wrocław | Team |
Women's Pan-American Championship
| Gold medal – first place | 2025 Auburndale | Team |

The United States women's national lacrosse team represents the United States in women's field lacrosse international competitions. It is currently organized by USA Lacrosse.

== History ==
The United States Women's Lacrosse Association was established in 1931, with the organization selecting the first American women's field lacrosse team in 1933. In 1935, the United States began sending a women's team in the United Kingdom for a tour. This continued for the next decades with the United States playing teams primarily representing Great Britain or England in tours.

Growth of women's lacrosse happened in the 1970s, with the establishment of the International Federation of Women's Lacrosse Associations (IFWLA). IFWLA was later absorbed into the Federation of International Lacrosse (later renamed World Lacrosse). In 1973, the United States defeated the visiting Great Britain team on home soil for the first time.

The United States have taken part in the Women's Lacrosse World Cup (later the Women's World Championship) since the inaugural edition in 1982. The United States won the first ever official women's world championship event. They have won ten out of twelve editions of the Women's World Championship, with the latest being the 2026 edition in Tokyo, Japan.

== Current roster ==
The following 22 players were named to the squad for the 2026 World Lacrosse Women's Championship.

| Pos. | Name | Hometown | College | League / Club | Debut |
|---|---|---|---|---|---|
| GK | Shea Dolce | Darien, CT | Boston College '26 | Athletes Unlimited | |
| GK | Caylee Waters | Darien, CT | University of North Carolina '17 | Athletes Unlimited | 2015 |
| DF | Shea Baker | Ithaca, N.Y | Boston College | Athletes Unlimited | |
| DF | Sam Forrest | Glastonbury, CT | North Carolina State University '26 | Athletes Unlimited | |
| DF | Katie Goodale | Riverhead, NY | Syracuse University '24 | Athletes Unlimited | |
| DF | Sydney Scales | Walpole, MA | Boston College '24 | Athletes Unlimited | |
| MF | Anna Brandt | White Hall, MI | University of Pennsylvania '25 | Athletes Unlimited | |
| MF | Brigid Duffy | Queensbury, NY | United States Military Academy '26 | Athletes Unlimited | |
| MF | Kori Edmondson | Severn, MD | University of Maryland, College Park '26 | Athletes Unlimited | |
| MF | Ally Kennedy | North Babylon, NY | Stony Brook University '20 | Athletes Unlimited | 2018 |
| MF | Ally Mastroianni | Martinsville, NJ | University of North Carolina '20 | Athletes Unlimited | 2021 |
| MF | Marie McCool | Moorestown, NJ | University of North Carolina '18 | Athletes Unlimited | 2015 |
| MF | Emma Muchnick | Suffern, NY | Syracuse University '26 | Athletes Unlimited | |
| MF | Eliza Osburn | Castle Rock, CO | North Carolina State University '28 | Athletes Unlimited | |
| MF | Cassidy Weeks | Bayport, NY | Boston College '24 | Athletes Unlimited | |
| AT | Sam Apuzzo | West Babylon, NY | Boston College '19 | Athletes Unlimited | 2018 |
| AT | Chloe Humphrey | Darien, CT | North Carolina State University '28 | — | 2019 |
| AT | Kenzie Kent | Norwell, MA | Boston College '19 | — | |
| AT | Emma LoPinto | Manhasset, N.Y | Boston College '25 | — | 2024 |
| AT | Charlotte North | Dallas, TX | Boston College '21 | Athletes Unlimited | |
| AT | Izzy Scane | Clarkston, MI | Northwestern University '22 | Athletes Unlimited | 2019 |
| AT | Madison Taylor | Wantagh, NY | Northwestern University '26 | Athletes Unlimited | |

== Team records ==
=== Women's World Championship ===
The team has participated in every Women's World Championship through 2026 and have won a medal in every appearance.

World Lacrosse Women's Championship record
| Year | Result | Matches | Wins | Draws | Losses | PF | PA | Coach |
|---|---|---|---|---|---|---|---|---|
| (England) 1982 | Champions | 6 | 5 | 0 | 1 | 62 | 23 | Jackie Pitts |
| (United States) 1986 | Runners-up | 6 | 4 | 0 | 2 | 56 | 25 | Josie Harper |
| (Australia) 1989 | Champions | 6 | 5 | 0 | 1 | 56 | 22 | Sue Stahl |
| (Scotland) 1993 | Champions | 6 | 6 | 0 | 0 | 74 | 11 | Sue Stahl |
| (Japan) 1997 | Champions | 7 | 6 | 0 | 1 | 63 | 23 | Sue Stahl |
| (England) 2001 | Champions | 6 | 6 | 0 | 0 | 92 | 21 | Sue Stahl |
| (United States) 2005 | Runners-up | 8 | 6 | 1 | 1 | 109 | 41 | Sue Stahl |
| (Czech Republic) 2009 | Champions | 7 | 7 | 0 | 0 | 114 | 48 | Sue Heether |
| (Canada) 2013 | Champions | 7 | 7 | 0 | 0 | 127 | | Ricky Fried |
| (England) 2017 | Champions | 8 | 8 | 0 | 0 | 135 | 37 | Ricky Fried |
| (United States) 2022 | Champions | 8 | 8 | 0 | 0 | 134 | 39 | Jenny Levy |
| (Japan) 2026 | Champions | 6 | 6 | 0 | 0 | 121 | 27 | Acacia Walker-Weinstein |
| Total | 12/12 | 81 | 74 | 1 | 6 | 1143 | — | |

=== World Games ===
World Games record
| Year | Result | Matches | Wins | Draws | Losses | PF | PA | Coach |
|---|---|---|---|---|---|---|---|---|
| (Poland) 2017 | Gold medal | 4 | 4 | 0 | 0 | 63 | 19 | |
| Total | 1/1 | 4 | 4 | 0 | 0 | 63 | 19 | — |

- Lacrosse is conducted in the sixes format since 2022.

=== Women's Pan-American Championship ===
Pan-American Women's Lacrosse Championship record
| Year | Result | Matches | Wins | Draws | Losses | PF | PA | Coach |
|---|---|---|---|---|---|---|---|---|
| (United States) 2025 | Champions | 5 | 5 | 0 | 0 | 110 | 27 | |
| Total | 1/1 | 5 | 5 | 0 | 0 | 110 | 27 | — |
