= World Lacrosse Women's Championship =

International women's lacrosse championship

- Current season, competition or edition: 2026 World Lacrosse Women's Championship
- Sport: Lacrosse
- Founded: 1982
- Countries: World Lacrosse member nations
- Most recent champions: United States (10th title)
- Most titles: United States (10 titles)
- Relegation to: Division II
- Website: Official website

The World Lacrosse Women's Championship, formerly known as the Women's Lacrosse World Cup, is the international championship of women's lacrosse, is held every four years. From its inception in 1982, it was sponsored by the governing body for women's lacrosse, the International Federation of Women's Lacrosse Associations, until that body merged in 2008 with the former governing body for men's lacrosse. Since 2009, the WLWC has been sponsored by the sport's new unified governing body, the Federation of International Lacrosse. The 2017 Women's Lacrosse World Cup was held in Guildford, England, and was won by the United States over Canada by the score of 10-5.

== History ==
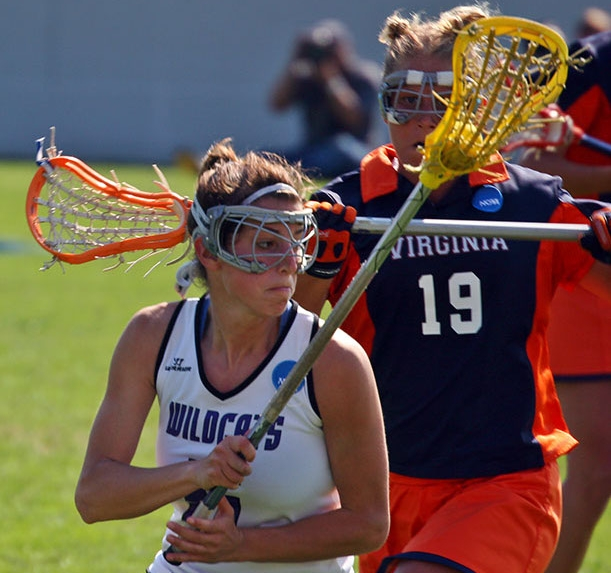
Women playing Lacrosse

Four players took part in all of the first five editions of the Women's Lacrosse World Cup, Vivien Jones of Wales, Lois Richardson of England, and Sue Sofanos and Marge Barlow both of Australia.

== Results ==
Year	Host	Champions	Score	Runner-up
1982	(England); Nottingham	United States	10–7 (ET)	Australia
1986	(United States); Swarthmore, Pennsylvania	Australia	10–7	United States
1989	(Australia); Perth	United States	6–5 (SD OT)	England
1993	(Scotland); Edinburgh	United States	4–1	England
1997	(Japan); Tokyo	United States	3–2 (SD OT)	Australia
2001	(England); High Wycombe	United States	14–8	Australia
2005	(United States); Annapolis, Maryland	Australia	14–7	United States
2009	(Czech Republic); Prague	United States	8–7	Australia
2013	(Canada); Oshawa	United States	19–5	Canada
2017	(England); Guildford	United States	10–5	Canada
2022	(United States); Towson, Maryland	United States	11–8	Canada
2026	(Japan); Tokyo	United States	16–4	Canada

== Medal table ==
Rank	Nation	Gold	Silver	Bronze	Total
1	United States	10	2	0	12
2	Australia	2	4	3	9
3	Canada	0	4	2	6
4	England	0	2	5	7
5	Israel	0	0	1	1
5	Scotland	0	0	1	1
Totals (6 entries)		12	12	12	36

== Past results ==
Team	1982 (England) (6)	1986 (United States) (6)	1989 (Australia) (6)	1993 (Scotland) (8)	1997 (Japan) (7)	2001 (England) (8)	2005 (United States) (10)	2009 (Czech Republic) (16)	2013 (Canada) (19)	2017 (England) (25)	2022 (United States) (30)	2026 (Japan) (16)
Argentina											26th	9th
Australia	2nd	1st	3rd	3rd	2nd	2nd	1st	2nd	3rd	4th	4th	6th
Austria								14th	13th		25th	
Belgium										25th		
Canada	3rd	4th	4th	4th	5th	4th	4th	3rd	2nd	2nd	2nd	2nd
Colombia										24th	29th	
China										22nd	19th	
Chinese Taipei												15th
Czech Republic				8th			8th	9th		10th	7th	13th
Denmark								15th				
England	5th	5th	2nd	2nd	3rd	3rd	3rd	4th	4th	3rd	3rd	5th
Finland									16th			
Germany						8th	9th	10th	12th	14th	14th	16th
Haudenosaunee								11th	7th	12th	8th	4th
Hong Kong									18th	18th	16th	
Ireland								5th	10th	13th	13th	11th
Israel									8th	6th	6th	3rd
Italy										11th	18th	
Jamaica											28th	
Japan				7th	7th	7th	5th	7th	9th	9th	5th	7th
Latvia									17th	17th	20th	
Mexico										20th	15th	
Netherlands								13th	14th	16th	17th	
Norway											22nd	
New Zealand							10th	12th	11th	8th	12th	
Philippines												10th
Puerto Rico											11th	8th
Scotland	4th	3rd	5th	5th	6th	6th	7th	8th	6th	5th	10th	14th
South Korea								16th	15th	15th	21st	
Spain										23rd	24th	
Sweden									19th	21st	23rd	
Switzerland										19th	27th	
Uganda											w	
United States	1st	2nd	1st	1st	1st	1st	2nd	1st	1st	1st	1st	1st
Wales	6th	6th	6th	6th	4th	5th	6th	6th	5th	7th	9th	12th

== See also ==
- Men's World Lacrosse Championship
- World Lacrosse Women's U20 Championship
