= Scotland women's national lacrosse team =

National lacrosse team

Scotland
- Association: Lacrosse Scotland
- Confederation: ELF (Europe)

World Championship
- Appearances: 11 (first in 1982)
- Best result: Third place (1986)

The Scotland national women's lacrosse team represents Scotland at women's lacrosse. It is governed by Lacrosse Scotland.

== Women's Lacrosse World Cup Past Results ==
=== 1982 ===
- 1st United States
- 2nd Australia
- 3rd Canada
- 4th Scotland
- 5th England
- 6th Wales

=== 1986 ===
- 1st Australia
- 2nd United States
- 3rd Scotland
- 4th Canada
- 5th England
- 6th Wales

=== 1989 ===
- 1st United States
- 2nd England
- 3rd Australia
- 4th Canada
- 5th Scotland
- 6th Wales

=== 1993 ===
- 1st United States
- 2nd England
- 3rd Australia
- 4th Canada
- 5th Scotland
- 6th Wales
- 7th Japan
- 8th Czech Republic

=== 1997 ===
- 1st United States
- 2nd Australia
- 3rd England
- 4th Wales
- 5th Canada
- 6th Scotland
- 7th Japan

=== 2001 ===
- 1st United States
- 2nd Australia
- 3rd England
- 4th Canada
- 5th Wales
- 6th Scotland
- 7th Japan
- 8th Germany

=== 2005 ===
- 1st Australia
- 2nd United States
- 3rd England
- 4th Canada
- 5th Japan
- 6th Wales
- 7th Scotland
- 8th Czech Republic
- 9th Germany
- 10th New Zealand

=== 2009 ===
Teams were split into three separate pools. Pool B consisted of Wales, Scotland, Czech Republic, Germany and New Zealand, who played round robins games against each team in their pool seeding for the quarterfinals. The quarterfinals were followed up by consolation games, the semifinals, and the bronze and gold medal games. Scotland lost to Australia 17–4 in the quarterfinals.
