= England women's national lacrosse team =

England
- Association: English Lacrosse Association
- Confederation: ELF (Europe)

World Championship
- Appearances: 12 (first in 1982)
- Best result: Runner-ups (1989, 1993)
- Website: www.englandlacrosse.co.uk

The England women's national lacrosse team represents England at women's lacrosse. It is governed by the English Lacrosse Association. They were runners-up in the Women's Lacrosse World Cup twice, and have also hosted the tournament twice. The team came 3rd in the 2017 Women's Lacrosse World Cup, which has held in Oshawa, Canada. The team is a full member of the Federation of International Lacrosse.

England will be hosting the 2017 Women's Lacrosse World Cup . The tournament will be held at the Surrey Sports Park in Guildford, Surrey, in the South East of England, with 30 nations expected to compete. The official team colours of the English national team are red and white. Kukri are Team England's official on-field and off-field teamwear providers. STX are Team England's official equipment providers.

England national lacrosse team
Players	Coaches
Katie Greenwood; Brittany Read; Emma Adams; Chloe Chan; Emma Oakley; Emily Nalls; Charlie Wilson; Claire Faram; Emily Gray; Laura Merrifield; Tilly Shires; Ruby Smith; Olivia Thomas; Liv Wimpenny; Torz Anderson; Olivia Hompe; Georgie Southorn; Megan Whittle; Anna Featherstone; Tilly Foster; Lucy Grant; Araminta Loxton-Barnard	Head coach: Phil Collier; Assistants: Kate Nelson-Lee, Michael Molster; Team Manager: Lara Owen

== See also ==
- Lacrosse in England
- Great Britain women's national lacrosse team
- England men's national lacrosse team
- Sport in England
