= 2017 UWLX season =

- League: United Women's Lacrosse League
- Sport: Lacrosse
- Duration: May 27 – August 2, 2017
- Teams: 4

Regular Season

Finals

UWLX seasons
- 2016

The 2017 United Women's Lacrosse League season, the second in the history of the UWLX, starts on May 27, 2017 and ends with the league championship game on August 2, 2017.

== Offseason ==
=== 2017 UWLX Draft results ===
- - indicates a returning player
- Baltimore Ride

Group	Player	Position	Nationality	College
1	Erica Bodt *	Midfield	United States	Syracuse
1	Amanda Johansen *		United States	
1	Caroline Gandolfi *		United States	
1	Kerry Stoothoff *		United States	
1	Ally Carey *		United States	
2	Morgan Stephens *		United States	
2	Brooke Griffin *		United States	
2	Taylor Cummings *	Midfield	United States	Maryland
2	Katie Schwarzmann *		United States	Maryland
2	Laura Merrifield		England	
3	Tayler Virden		United States	
3	Brittain Altomare		United States	
3	Sarah Mannelly		United States	
3	Madison Cyr		United States	Penn State
3	Brittany Poist		United States	
4	Zoe Stuckenberg	Midfield	United States	Maryland
4	Steph Lazo	Attack	United States	Penn State
4	Sammi Burgess		United States	
4	Caroline Federico		United States	
4	Caroline Wannen		United States	

- Boston Storm

Group	Player	Position	Nationality	College
1	Liz Hogan *	Goal	United States	Syracuse
1	Lauren Kahn *	Midfield	United States	UConn
1	Danielle Etrasco *	Attack	United States	Boston University
1	Kelsey Sheridan *	Defense	United States	UMass
1	Ali Flury *	Midfield	United States	Denver
2	Jen Russell *		United States	
2	Kayla Treanor *	Attack	United States	Syracuse
2	Holly Reilly *		United States	
2	Colleen Magarity *		United States	
2	Danielle Spencer *		United States	
3	Kaila Gottlick	Midfield	United States	Ohio State
3	Jennifer Schmitt	Midfield	United States	Ohio State
3	Caitlin Villareal	Attack	United States	St. Anselm College
3	Nicole Poli	Defense	United States	Western New England
3	Bre Hudgins	Attack	United States	Brown
4	Kayla O’Connor	Attack	United States	Boston College
4	Hannah Murphy	Midfield	United States	UMass
4	Carly Cronin	Defense	United States	Bryant
4	Kate Weeks	Attack	United States	Boston College
4	Elisabeth Jayne	Attack	United States	Boston University
5	Tanner Guarino *	Midfield	United States	UMass
5	McKinley Sbordone	Attack	United States	Boston University
5	Marina Burke	Defense	United States	Harvard
5	Jackie Chirco	Goal	United States	Assumption College
5	Sarah Dalton	Attack	United States	Boston University
5	Charle Finnigan	Attack	United States	Virginia
5	Vicki Graveline	Midfield	United States	Le Moyne
5	Mary Heneberry	Attack	United States	Loyola
5	Rachel Vallarelli	Goal	United States	UMass

- Long Island Sound

Round	Player	Position	Nationality	College
1	Tatum Coffey *		United States	
1	Erin Collins *		United States	
1	Kelsey Gregerson *		United States	
1	Halle Majorana *	Attack	United States	Syracuse
1	Kelly McPartland *		United States	
2	Alice Mercer *		United States	Maryland
2	Sloan Serpe *		United States	
2	Taryn Von Thof *		United States	
2	Katrina Dowd *		United States	
2	Becca Block *		United States	
3	Mikaela Rix		United States	
3	Kaleigh Craig		United States	
3	Nicole Graziano		United States	
3	Octavia Williams	Defense	United States	Johns Hopkins University
3	Dorrien Van Dyke		United States	
4	Cortney Fortunato	Attack	United States	Notre Dame
4	Nadine Hadnagy	Defense	United States	Maryland
4	Sami Jo Tracy	Attack	United States	UNC
4	Caroline Fitzgerald		United States	
4	Caylee Waters	Goalie	United States	UNC

- Philly Force

Round	Player	Position	Nationality	College
1	Kara Mupo *		United States	
1	Bridget Bianco *		United States	
1	Alyssa Murray *		United States	Syracuse
1	Barbara Sullivan *	Midfield	United States	Notre Dame
1	Katie Hertsch *		United States	
2	Emily Garrity *		United States	
2	Samantha Cermack *		United States	
2	Becky Lynch *		United States	
2	Casey Pepperman *		United States	
2	Margret Corzel *		United States	
3	Julie Gardner *		United States	
3	Kelsey McGovern *		United States	
3	Emily Leitner *		United States	
3	Sarah Lloyd *		United States	
3	Bryn Boucher		United States	
4	Michele Tumolo		United States	Syracuse
4	Megan Kelly		United States	
4	Zoe Ochoa		United States	
4	Oliva Hompe	Attack	United States	Princeton
4	Jackie Jahelka		United States	

== Regular season ==
=== League standings ===
Team	Wins	Losses	GF	GA	Pts
Long Island Sound	5	0			
Philadelphia Force	3	2			
Boston Storm	2	3			
Baltimore Ride	0	5			

== Schedule ==
Home	Score	Away	Score
Week 1 - May 27, 2017
Attleboro High School
Boston Storm	-	Philadelphia Force	-
Long Island Sound	-	Baltimore Ride	-
Week 2 - June 2–3, 2017
Long Island, NY
Boston Storm	-	Long Island Sound	-
New Canaan HS, New Caanan, CT
Baltimore Ride	-	Philadelphia Force	-
Week 3 - June 9, 2017
UMass Amherst
Long Island Sound	-	Boston Storm	-
Philadelphia Force	-	Baltimore Ride	-
Week 4 - June 16–17, 2017
Philadelphia, PA
Philadelphia Force	-	Boston Storm	-
Bel Air, MD (Cedar Lane)
Long Island Sound	-	Baltimore Ride	-
Week 5 - July 7, 2017
Delaware Turf Fields
Boston Storm	-	Philadelphia Force	-
Baltimore Ride	-	Long Island Sound	-
Week 6 - July 14–15, 2017
Richmond, VA
Long Island Sound	-	Philadelphia Force	-
Boston Storm	-	Baltimore Ride	-
Week 7 - July 20–21, 2017
Long Island, NY
Long Island Sound	-	Boston Storm	-
Downington, PA
Philadelphia Force	-	Baltimore Ride	-

== See also ==
- 2017 in sports
