= 2016 UWLX season =

- League: United Women's Lacrosse League
- Sport: Lacrosse
- Duration: May 28 – July 30, 2016
- Teams: 4

Regular Season
- Top seed: Long Island Sound
- Top scorer: Dana Dobbie

Finals
- Champions: Long Island Sound
- Runners-up: Boston Storm
- Finals MVP: Devon Wills

UWLX seasons
- 2017

The 2016 United Women's Lacrosse League season, the first in the history of the UWLX, started on May 28, 2016 and ended with the league championship game on July 31, 2016 in which the Long Island Sound defeated the Boston Storm in a 13-8 final.

The first game in league history took place on May 28, 2016 at Goodman Stadium at Lehigh University in Bethlehem, Pennsylvania. Opposing the Baltimore Ride, Long Island prevailed by a 13-12 tally. The team's first-ever goal was scored by McKinley Curro, who would also score the league's first-ever two-point goal. Devon Wills served as the starting goaltender, allowing the first goal in UWLX history to Baltimore's Beth Glaros, while also registering the first win in league history.

== Offseason ==
=== 2016 UWLX Draft results ===
In the inaugural draft, Maryland Terrapins alumnus and former US national team player Katie Schwarzmann would be the first ever player selected, taken by the Baltimore Ride with the top pick. Other players selected in the first round of the inaugural draft were also current or former members of the US national team. Said players included Liz Hogan (Boston), Michelle Tumolo (Philly) and Devon Wills (Long Island).

- Baltimore Ride

Pick	Player	Position	Nationality	College
1	Katie Schwarzmann	Midfielder	United States	Maryland
2	Alex Aust	Attacker	United States	Maryland
3	Kristen Carr	Defender	United States	North Carolina
4	Brooke Griffin	Attacker	United States	Maryland
5	Allyson Carey	Midfielder	United States	Vanderbilt
6	Morgan Stephens	Defender	United States	Virginia
7	Courtney Swan	Attacker	United States	Virginia
8	Dana Dobbie	Attacker	Canada	Maryland
9	Beth Glaros	Midfielder	United States	Maryland
10	Sam Farrell	Defender	United States	Florida

- Long Island Sound

Pick	Player	Position	Nationality	College
1	Devon Wills	Goalie	United States	Dartmouth
2	Alyssa Leonard	Attacker	United States	Northwestern
3	Shannon Gilroy	Midfielder	United States	Florida
4	Becca Block	Defender	United States	Syracuse
5	Megan Douty	Defender	United States	Maryland
6	Sloane Serpe	Defender	United States	North Carolina
7	Nora Barry	Midfielder	United States	Florida
8	Katrina Dowd	Attacker	United States	Northwestern
9	Katie Rowan	Attacker	United States	Syracuse
10	Kelly McPartland	Midfielder	United States	Maryland

- Philly Force

Pick	Player	Position	Nationality	College
1	Michelle Tumolo	Attacker	United States	Syracuse
2	Alyssa Murray	Attacker	United States	Syracuse
3	Kara Mupo	Attacker	United States	Northwestern
4	Bridget Bianco	Goalie	United States	Northwestern
5	Becky Lynch	Attacker	United States	North Carolina
6	Casey Pepperman	Defender	United States	Maryland
7	Demmianne Cook	Midfielder	United States	Stony Brook
8	Katie Hertsch	Defender	United States	Hofstra
9	Emily Garrity	Midfielder	United States	North Carolina
10	Samantha Cermack	Midfielder	United States	Johns Hopkins

- Boston Storm

Pick	Player	Position	Nationality	College
1	Liz Hogan	Goalie	United States	Syracuse
2	Jennifer Russell	Defender	United States	North Carolina
3	Sarah Bullard	Midfielder	United States	Duke
4	Kara Cannizzaro	Midfielder	United States	North Carolina
5	Erin Slifer	Midfielder	United States	Princeton
6	Holly Reilly	Defender	United States	Princeton
7	Danielle Etrasco	Attacker	United States	Boston University
8	Kailah Kempney	Attacker	United States	Syracuse
9	Kristin Igoe	Midfielder	United States	Boston College
10	Colleen Magarity	Midfielder	United States	Northwestern

== Regular season ==
- June 10: Alex Aust of the Baltimore Ride set a UWLX record for most goals in one game with six. Of note, Aust would record a hat trick in the first and second half of the contest against the Boston Storm.

=== League standings ===
Team	Wins	Losses	GF	GA	Pts
Long Island Sound	6	2	100	79	0
Boston Storm	5	3	99	88	0
Baltimore Ride	3	5	100	103	0
Philly Force	2	6	72	101	0

=== League leaders ===
==== Regular season scoring ====
Player	Team	GP	G	A	Pts	PIM	LB
Dana Dobbie	Baltimore Ride	8	16	10	26	0	0
Katie Schwarzmann	Baltimore Ride	8	9	12	21	0	0
Alyssa Leonard	Long Island Sound	8	13	7	20	0	0
Katrina Dowd	Long Island Sound	8	11	9	20	0	0
Kayla Treanor	Boston Storm	6	13	7	20	0	0
Kara Mupo	Philadelphia Force	8	18	0	18	0	0
Kailah Kempney	Philadelphia Force	8	12	5	17	0	0
Halle Majorana	Philadelphia Force	8	13	4	17	0	0
Danielle Spencer	Boston Storm	8	14	2	16	0	0
Alex Aust	Baltimore Ride	5	12	2	14	0	0

==== Goaltending leaders ====
- The following reflect regular season statistics

Player	Team	GP	W	L	GA	GAA
Devon Wills	Long Island Sound	6	5	1	55	9.87
Julie Wadland	Boston Storm	3	2	1	29	10.15
Liz Hogan	Boston Storm	5	3	2	59	12.15
Frankie Candi	Baltimore Ride	5	3	2	53	12.58

== Schedule ==
Home	Score	Away	Score
Week 1 - May 28, 2016
US Lacrosse Women’s National Tournament @ Lehigh University, Bethlehem, PA
Long Island Sound	13	Baltimore Ride	12
Boston Storm	16	Philadelphia Force	8
Week 2 - June 10–11, 2016
IWLCA New England Cup @ UMass Amherst, Amherst, MA
Boston Storm	17	Baltimore Ride	16
Long Island Sound	14	Philadelphia Force	8
Week 3 - June 18, 2016 with Eyekonz FH and LAX League and Strawberry Mansion HS GLAX
St. Joseph's University, Philadelphia, PA
Philadelphia Force	11	Baltimore Ride	15
National Draw @ Decou Sports Complex, Cherry Hill, NJ
Boston Storm	9	Long Island Sound	12
Week 4 - June 24–25, 2016
Project 120 @ Lehigh University, Bethlehem, PA
Philadelphia Force	9	Long Island Sound	11
Boston Storm	14	Baltimore Ride	15
Philadelphia Force	9	Boston Storm	14
Long Island Sound	17	Baltimore Ride	7
Week 6 - July 8–9, 2016
Lincoln-Sudbury HS, Sudbury, MA
Boston Storm	10	Long Island Sound	9
The Grind @ Westtown School, West Chester, PA
Baltimore Ride	14	Philadelphia Force	5
Week 7 - July 15–16, 2016
IWLCA Capital Cup @ Richmond, VA
Baltimore Ride	10	Boston Storm	11
Long Island Sound	9	Philadelphia Force	13
Boston Storm	8	Philadelphia Force	9
Baltimore Ride	11	Long Island Sound	15

== Postseason ==
Inaugural Championship Weekend was held on July 31 on Homewood Field at Johns Hopkins University in Baltimore, Maryland. The Long Island Sound defeated the Boston Storm, 13-8. The Sound's goalkeeper, Devon Wills (#3), was named MVP.

Trivia: the semi-final games were originally scheduled to be played on Friday, July 30, but they were both rescheduled due to a thunderstorm - the underway results of the Sound vs Force game were vacated (the Sound were leading 5-4 before the initial lightning delay), and all three games were played on July 31.

Semifinals
1	Long Island Sound	8
4	Philadelphia Force	4
2	Boston Storm	10
3	Baltimore Ride	3

Finals
1	Long Island Sound	13
2	Boston Storm	8

== Awards and honors ==
=== All-Star teams ===
On August 31, 2016, the league named its All-Star Team, as the Long Island Sound featured the most players named, with 10.

- Attack position

Player	Team	Player	Team
Alex Aust	Baltimore Ride	Dana Dobbie	Baltimore Ride
Katrina Dowd	Long Island Sound	Alyssa Leonard	Long Island Sound
Kara Mupo	Philadelphia Force	Alyssa Murray	Philadelphia Force
Danielle Spencer	Boston Storm	Kayla Treanor	Boston Storm

- Midfield position

Player	Team	Player	Team
Sarah Bullard	Boston Storm	Taylor Cummings	Baltimore Ride
Hillary Fratzke	Long Island Sound	Shannon Gilroy	Long Island Sound
Beth Glaros	Baltimore Ride	Kristin Igoe	Boston Storm
Kelly McPartland	Long Island Sound	Katie Schwarzmann	Baltimore Ride
Erin Silfer	Boston Storm	Taryn Van Thof	Long Island Sound

- Defense position

Player	Team	Player	Team
Becca Block	Long Island Sound	Kristen Carr	Baltimore Ride
Katie Hertsch	Philadelphia Force	Maddy Lesher	Baltimore Ride
Alice Mercer	Long Island Sound	Holly Reilly	Boston Storm
Jennifer Russell	Boston Storm	Sloane Serpe	Long Island Sound

- Goaltending position

Player	Team	Player	Team
Bridget Bianco	Philadelphia Force	Liz Hogan	Boston Storm
Kerry Stoothoff	Baltimore Ride	Devon Wills	Long Island Sound
