= Honda Sports Award =

Sports award, given to the best collegiate female athlete in each of twelve sports

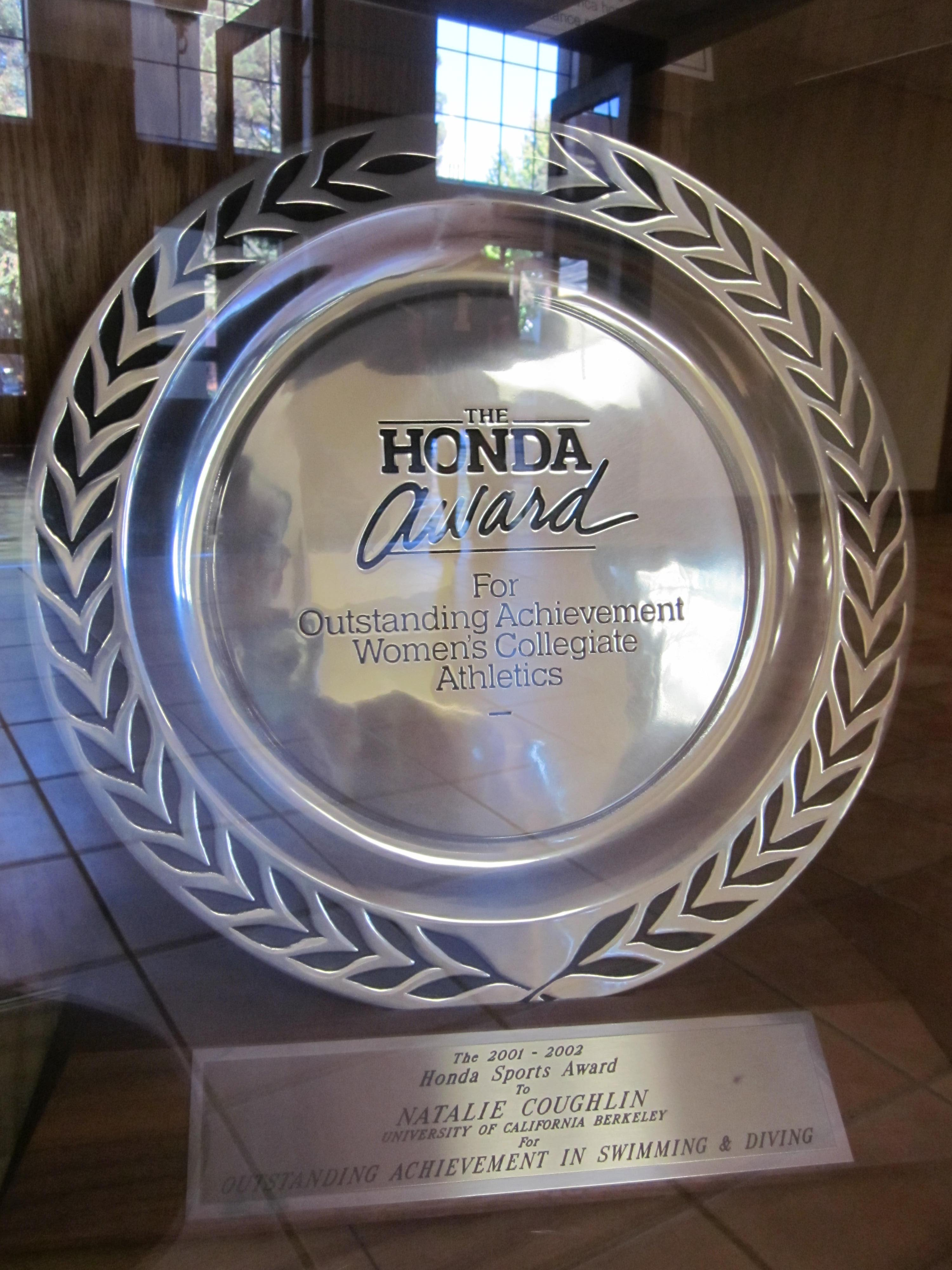
- Exemplar of Honda Sports Award
- Awarded for: Top female athletes in 12 different NCAA-sanctioned sports reflecting athletic achievement, scholastics and community involvement
- Country: United States
- Presented by: Collegiate Women Sports Awards (starting in 2001)
- First award: 1976
- Website: Official website

The Honda Sports Award is an annual award in the United States, given to the best collegiate female athlete in each of twelve sports. There are four nominees for each sport, and the twelve winners of the Honda Sports Award are automatically in the running for the Honda-Broderick Cup award, as the Collegiate Woman Athlete of the Year. Three other athletes are honored as the Division II Athlete of the Year, Division III Athlete of the Year, and Inspiration Award winner.

== Process ==
Winners are selected in each of the 12 NCAA-sanctioned sports by a panel of more than 1,000 NCAA administrators. Three other athletes are honored as the Division II Athlete of the Year, Division III Athlete of the Year, and Inspiration Award winner. Each woman is selected not only for her superior athletic skills, but also for her leadership abilities, academic excellence and eagerness to participate in community service.

At the end of the year, one deserving athlete will be chosen as the Collegiate Woman Athlete of the Year and receive the coveted Honda-Broderick Cup. Past winners of this prestigious award include Jackie Joyner and Mia Hamm.

Honda has donated more than $3.4 million in grants and scholarships to the universities over the course of the program.

== History of the awards ==
The Awards were first created in 1976, when Tom Broderick, an owner of an apparel store in Fergus, Ontario, decided to partner with Judie Holland, the senior women's administrator at UCLA and Irv Grossman, a journalist, sports marketer and media consultant, to create awards to recognize top female athletes at the collegiate level.

The first awards were given in 1977, for Division I athletes, initially in ten sports and later expanded to 12 sports:

- Basketball
- Cross Country
- Field Hockey
- Golf
- Gymnastics
- Softball
- Swimming & Diving
- Tennis
- Track & Field
- Volleyball
- Soccer (added in 1990)
- Lacrosse (added in 2001)

Each of these awards was initially called the Broderick Award. In addition to an individual award for a recipient in each of the ten sports, an overall winner across all sports was selected, and that individual also received an award, called the Broderick Cup, representing the top female athlete in collegiate athletics.

Although athletics prowess was a major consideration in the selection process, the selection committee considered "not only athletic achievement but also the ideals of team contribution, scholastic endeavor, school and community involvement and those personal characteristics as stated in the philosophy of the NCAA".

In 1985, American Honda agreed to become the main sponsor of the awards, so the name of the award was changed to the Honda-Broderick Award for each of the individual sports, and the Honda-Broderick Cup for the overall winner.

In 1988, three new awards were created. Two awards recognize Division II and Division III athletes, respectively with a single award for each division covering all athletes in all of the designated sports. The third award is the Inspiration Award, which goes to a female athlete who has had to overcome hardship. Nominees are provided by all NCAA sanctioned schools and the organization Board of Directors makes the final selection.

Between 1995 and 2008 the organization also selected a recipient of an Award of Merit. The potential recipients were not collegiate athletes, but individuals and organization who contributed significantly to:

- Public awareness and appreciation of women's collegiate athletics
- Elevation of the status of women's collegiate sports on a national level

This award was renamed the Irv Grossman Award of Merit in 2007, after his death in 2006.

The recipients of this award have been:

- 1995 Charlotte West (Southern Illinois)
- 1996 Phyllis Howlett (Big Ten Conference)
- 1997 Christine Grant (Iowa)
- 1998 Judith M. Sweet (UC San Diego)
- 1999 Judith R. Holland (UCLA)
- 2000 Barbara Hedges (Washington)
- 2002 Ruth Berkey (NCAA)
- 2003 Patsy Mink (Senator, Hawaii)
- 2004 Birch Bayh (Senator, Indiana)
- 2007 Vivian Stringer (Head Coach, Rutgers Women's Basketball)
- 2007 Rutgers Women's Basketball (Women's Basketball Team)
- 2008 Women's Sports Foundation (WSF, Founded by Billie Jean King)

== Award ceremony ==
Honda Sports Award announcement for the winners of the twelve sports are scheduled throughout the school year, following the completion of the post-season tournament. Other awards are presented as part of a two-day event, typically in late June of each year.

The Collegiate Women Sports Award (CWSA) partnered with ESPNU for the 2013 event, and since 2014, has partnered with CBS to televise the announcement of the following awards:

- Honda Inspiration Award
- Honda Division II Player of the Year
- Honda Division III Player of the Year
- "Top Three" finalists selected from the twelve award winners of each individual sport
- Honda Cup for the overall Collegiate Woman of the Year

Since 2013, the annual event has been held at the USC Founders Club at Galen Center in Los Angeles.

The 2020 award ceremony scheduled for June was cancelled due to COVID-19.

== Pre-2000 Winners and nominees ==
For award winners and nominees prior to 2000, see Honda Sports Award pre 2000 winners and nominees

== 2000–01 Winners and nominees ==
| Sport | Winner | College | Finalists |
|---|---|---|---|
| Basketball | Jackie Stiles | Southwest Missouri State | Svetlana Abrosimova, Connecticut; Tamika Catchings, Tennessee; Ruth Riley, Notre Dame |
| Cross Country | Kara Grgas-Wheeler | Colorado | Shalane Flanagan, North Carolina; Sabrina Monro, Montana; Erica Palmer, Wisconsin |
| Field Hockey | Marina Digiacomo | Old Dominion | Traci Anselmo, Penn State; Kelli Gannon, Michigan; Carla Tagliente, Maryland |
| Golf | Candy Hannemann | Duke | Natalie Gulbis, Arizona; Candie Kung, Arizona; Lorena Ochoa, Arizona |
| Gymnastics | Mohini Bhardwaj | UCLA | Bridget Knaeble, Michigan; Suzanne Sears, Georgia; Onni Willis, UCLA |
| Lacrosse | Jen Adams | Maryland | Quinn Carney, Maryland; Bowen Holden, Georgetown; Sheehan Stanwick, Georgetown |
| Soccer | Meredith Florance | North Carolina | Meghan Anderson, Nebraska; Anne Makinen, Notre Dame; Tracey Milburn, UCLA; Christie Welsh, Penn State |
| Softball | Jennie Finch | Arizona | Oli Keohohou, BYU/Hawaii; Kelly Kretschman, Alabama; Stacey Nuveman, UCLA |
| Swimming & Diving | Misty Hyman | Stanford | Maggie Bowen, Auburn; Natalie Coughlin, California; Colleen Lanne’, Texas |
| Tennis | Laura Granville | Stanford | Bea Bielik, Wake Forest; Ansley Cargill, Duke; Michelle Dasso, Notre Dame |
| Track & Field | Brenda Taylor | Harvard | Tracy O’Hara, UCLA; Christina Tolson, UCLA; Angela Williams, USC |
| Volleyball | Greichaly Cepero | Nebraska | Kara Gormsen, University of the Pacific; Sherisa Livingston, Wisconsin; Logan Tom, Stanford |

| Award | Winner | Sport | College |
|---|---|---|---|
| Honda Cup Collegiate Woman Athlete of the Year | Jackie Stiles | Basketball | Southwest Missouri State |
| Honda Inspiration Award winner | Kendra Berner | Swimming & Diving | Davidson |
| DII Honda Athlete of the Year | Jessica Martin | Swimming & Diving | Truman State |
| DIII Honda Athlete of the Year | Tasha Rogers | Basketball | Washington (St. Louis) |

== 2001–02 Winners and nominees ==
| Sport | Winner | College | Finalists |
|---|---|---|---|
| Basketball | Sue Bird | Connecticut | Chantelle Anderson, Vanderbilt; Alana Beard, Duke; Diana Taurasi, Connecticut |
| Cross Country | Tara Chaplin | Arizona | Lauren Fleshman, Stanford; Renee Metivier, Georgia Tech; Kristin Price, North Carolina State |
| Field Hockey | Autumn Welsh | Maryland | Jemima Cameron, Wake Forest; Llvy Friebe, Princeton; Adrienne Yoder, Old Dominion |
| Golf | Virada Nirapathpongpora | Duke | Danielle Downey, Auburn; Lorena Ochoa, Arizona; Summer Sirmons, Georgia |
| Gymnastics | Andree’ Pickens | Alabama | Jamie Dantzscher, UCLA; MaryAnne Kelley, Minnesota; Theresa Kulikowski, Utah |
| Lacrosse | Erin Elbe | Georgetown | Rachel Becker, Princeton; Christine McPike, North Carolina; Jaimee Reynolds, Cornell |
| Soccer | Aly Wagner | Santa Clara | Joanna Lohman, Penn State; Abby Wambach, Florida; Christie Welsh, Penn State |
| Softball | Jennie Finch | Arizona | Stacey Nuveman, UCLA; Jamie Southern, Fresno State; Natasha Watley, UCLA |
| Swimming & Diving | Natalie Coughlin | California | Maggie Bowen, Auburn; Maritza Correia, Georgia; Shelly Ripple, Stanford |
| Tennis | Bea Bielik | Wake Forest | Erin Burdette, Stanford; Gabriela Lastra, Stanford; Jessica Lehnhoff, Florida |
| Track & Field | Angela Williams | USC | Brianna Glenn, Arizona; Muna Lee, LSU; Melissa Price, Nebraska |
| Volleyball | Logan Tom | Logan Tom | Emily Adams, USC; Aury Cruz, Florida; Kim Willoughby, Hawai'i |

| Award | Winner | Sport | College |
|---|---|---|---|
| Honda Cup Collegiate Woman Athlete of the Year | Angela Williams | USC | Track & Field |
| Honda Inspiration Award winner | Kristin Koetsier | Basketball | Western Michigan |
| DII Honda Athlete of the Year | Nicole Duncan | Track & Field | Cal State (LA) |
| DIII Honda Athlete of the Year | Julia Bergofsky | Field Hockey | Middlebury |

== 2002–03 Winners and nominees ==
| Sport | Winner | College | Finalists |
|---|---|---|---|
| Basketball | Diana Taurasi | Connecticut | Alana Beard, Duke; Nicole Ohlde, Kansas State; Latoya Thomas, Mississippi State |
| Cross Country | Shalane Flanagan | North Carolina | Alicia Craig, Stanford; Lauren Fleshman, Stanford; Kate O’Neill, Yale |
| Field Hockey | Tiffany Snow | Old Dominion | Marcie Boyer, New Hampshire; Llvy Friebe, Princeton; April Fronzoni, Michigan |
| Golf | Mikaela Parmlid | USC | Erica Blasberg, Arizona; Katherine Hull, Pepperdine; Lindsey Wright, Pepperdine |
| Gymnastics | Onni Willis | UCLA | Jamie Dantzscher, UCLA; Theresa Kulikowski, Utah; Richelle Simpson, Nebraska |
| Lacrosse | Rachael Becker | Princeton | Lauren Aumiller, Virginia; Kelly Coppedge, Maryland; Suzanne Eyler, Loyola College |
| Soccer | Christine Sinclair | Portland | Joanna Lohman, Penn State; Catherine Reddick, North Carolina; Aly Wagner, Santa Clara |
| Softball | Natasha Watley | UCLA | Lovie Jung, Arizona; Cat Osterman, Texas; Kristen Rivera, Washington |
| Swimming & Diving | Natalie Coughlin | California | Maggie Bowen, Auburn; Maritza Correia, Georgia; Shelly Ripple, Stanford |
| Tennis | Vilmarie Castellvi | Tennessee | Agata Cioroch, Georgia; Amber Liu, Stanford; Kelly McCain, Duke |
| Track & Field | Elva Goulbourne | Auburn | Laura Gerraughty, North Carolina; Muna Lee, LSU; Raasin McIntosh, Texas |
| Volleyball | Logan Tom | Stanford | Emily Adams, USC; Aury Cruz, Florida; Kim Willoughby, Hawaii |

| Award | Winner | Sport | College |
|---|---|---|---|
| Honda Cup Collegiate Woman Athlete of the Year | Natasha Watley | Softball | UCLA |
| Honda Inspiration Award winner | Kristy McPherson | Golf | South Carolina |
| DII Honda Athlete of the Year | Missy Gregg | Soccer | Christian Brothers |
| DIII Honda Athlete of the Year | Libby Hysell | Softball | Central |

== 2003–04 Winners and nominees ==
| Sport | Winner | College | Finalists |
|---|---|---|---|
| Basketball | Diana Taurasi | Connecticut | Alana Beard, Duke; Nicole Ohlde, Kansas State; Nicole Powell, Stanford; Lindsay Whalen, Minnesota |
| Cross Country | Shalane Flanagan | North Carolina | Sara Bei, Stanford; Michaela Mannova, Brigham Young; Kimberly Smith, Providence |
| Field Hockey | Kelly Doton | Wake Forest | Mari Creatini, Northeastern; April Fronzoni, Michigan; Vanessa Immordino, Ohio State |
| Golf | Sarah Huarte | California | Karin Sjodin, Oklahoma State; Susie Mathews, UCLA; Charlotte Mayorkas, UCLA |
| Gymnastics | Jeana Rice | Alabama | Jeanette Antolin, UCLA; Melissa Vituj, Utah; Lindsay Wing, Stanford |
| Lacrosse | Amy Appelt | Virginia | Kelly Coppedge, Maryland; Gail Decker, James Madison; Theresa Sherry, Princeton |
| Soccer | Catherine Reddick | North Carolina | Joanna Lohman, Penn State; Nandi Pryce, UCLA; Lindsay Tarpley, North Carolina |
| Softball | Jessica van der Linden | Florida State | Alicia Hollowell, Arizona; Lyhia McMichael, Mississippi State; Kristen Rivera, Washington |
| Swimming & Diving | Tara Kirk | Stanford | Margaret Hoelzer, Auburn; Natalie Coughlin, California; Kaitlin Sandeno, USC |
| Tennis | Amber Liu | Stanford | Megan Bradley, Miami; Julie Coin, Clemson; Jelena Pandzic, Fresno State |
| Track & Field | Kim Smith | Providence | Hyleas Fountain, Georgia; Tiffany McWilliams, Mississippi State; Lauryn Williams, Miami |
| Volleyball | April Ross | USC | Kele Eveland, Georgia Tech; Ogonna Nnamani, Stanford; Kim Willoughby, Hawaii |

| Award | Winner | Sport | College |
|---|---|---|---|
| Honda Cup Collegiate Woman Athlete of the Year | Tara Kirk | Swimming & Diving | Stanford |
| Honda Inspiration Award winner | Chanda Gunn | Ice Hockey | Northeastern |
| DII Honda Athlete of the Year | Zoila Gomez | Soccer | Adams State |
| DIII Honda Athlete of the Year | Mary Ellen Gordon | Tennis | Emory |

== 2004–05 Winners and nominees ==
| Sport | Winner | College | Finalists |
|---|---|---|---|
| Basketball | Seimone Augustus | LSU | Jacqueline Batteast, Notre Dame; Monique Currie, Duke; Jessica Davenport, Ohio State |
| Cross Country | Kim Smith | Providence | Caroline Bierbaum, Columbia; Renee Metivier, Colorado; Laura Turner, Brigham Young |
| Field Hockey | Kelly Dostal | Wake Forest | Veerle Goudswaard, Michigan State; Lauren Henderson, Connecticut; Paula Infante, Maryland |
| Golf | Anna Grzebien | Duke | Amie Cochran, California Los Angeles; Brittany Lang, Duke; Leah Wigger, Virginia |
| Gymnastics | Kristen Maloney | UCLA | Elise Ray, Michigan; Richelle Simpson, Nebraska; Annabeth Eberle, Utah |
| Lacrosse | Kristen Kjellman | Northwestern | Amy Appelt, Virginia; Katie Chrest, Duke; Katieanne Christian, Dartmouth |
| Soccer | Leslie Osborne | Santa Clara | Heather O’Reilly, North Carolina; Christine Sinclair, Portland; Tiffany Weimer, Penn State |
| Softball | Cat Osterman | Texas | Caitlin Lowe, Arizona; Kristen Rivera, Washington; Amanda Scarborough, Texas A&M |
| Swimming & Diving | Kirsty Coventry | Auburn | Caroline Bruce, Stanford; Mary DeScenza, Georgia; Kara Lynn Joyce, Georgia |
| Tennis | Zuzana Zemenová | Baylor | Audra Cohen, Northwestern; Jennifer Magley, Florida; Riza Zalameda, UCLA |
| Track & Field | Monique Henderson | UCLA | Marshevet Hooker, Texas; Tianna Madison, Tennessee; Virginia Powell, USC |
| Volleyball | Ogonna Nnamani | Stanford | Emily Adams, USC; Stacey Gordon, Ohio State; Sam Tortorello, Penn State |

| Award | Winner | Sport | College |
|---|---|---|---|
| Honda Cup Collegiate Woman Athlete of the Year | Ogonna Nnamani | Volleyball | Stanford |
| Honda Inspiration Award winner | Brittney Kroon | Basketball | Seattle Pacific |
| DII Honda Athlete of the Year | Krystal Lewallen | Softball | Northern Kentucky |
| DIII Honda Athlete of the Year | Missy Buttry | Cross Country | Wartburg |

== 2005–06 Winners and nominees ==
| Sport | Winner | College | Finalists |
|---|---|---|---|
| Basketball | Seimone Augustus | LSU | Ivory Latta, North Carolina; Cappie Pondexter, Rutgers; Sophia Young, Baylor |
| Cross Country | Caroline Bierbaum | Columbia | Stephanie Madia, Notre Dame; Victoria Mitchell, Butler; Johanna Nilsson, Northern Arizona |
| Field Hockey | Paula Infante | Maryland | Kayla Bashore, Indiana; Jessica Javelet, Louisville; Hilary Linton, Duke |
| Golf | Irene Cho | USC | Amanda Blumenherst, Duke; Jennie Lee, Duke; Dewi Schreefel, USC |
| Gymnastics | Ashley Miles | Alabama | Courtney Kupets, Georgia; Ashley Postell, Utah; Kate Richardson, UCLA |
| Lacrosse | Kristen Kjellman | Northwestern | Katie Chrest, Duke; Crysti Foote, Notre Dame; Coco Stanwick, Georgetown |
| Soccer | Christine Sinclair | Portland | Heather O’Reilly, North Carolina; Katie Thorlakson, Notre Dame; Tiffany Weimer, Penn State |
| Softball | Cat Osterman | Texas | Monica Abbot, Tennessee; Andrea Duran, UCLA; Sarah Fekete, Tennessee |
| Swimming & Diving | Mary DeScenza | Georgia | Blythe Hartley, Southern California; Kara Lynn Joyce, Georgia; Whitney Myers, Arizona |
| Tennis | Kristi Miller | Georgia Tech | Suzi Babos, California; Audra Cohen, Miami; Lindsey Nelson, USC |
| Track & Field | Virginia Powell | USC | Marshevet Hooker, Texas; Chelsea Johnson, California, Los Angeles; Melaine Walker, Texas |
| Volleyball | Courtney Thompson | Washington | Melissa Elmer, Nebraska; Christina Houghtelling, Nebraska; Sam Tortorello, Penn State |

| Award | Winner | Sport | College |
|---|---|---|---|
| Honda Cup Collegiate Woman Athlete of the Year | Christine Sinclair | Soccer | Portland |
| Honda Inspiration Award winner | Lindsay Payne | Swimming & Diving | Williams |
| DII Honda Athlete of the Year | Kristin Erb | Softball | Lock Haven |
| DIII Honda Athlete of the Year | Megan Silva | Basketball | Randolph-Macon |

== 2006–07 Winners and nominees ==
| Sport | Winner | College | Finalists |
|---|---|---|---|
| Basketball | Candace Parker | Tennessee | Sylvia Fowles, LSU; Lindsey Harding, Duke; Ivory Latta, North Carolina |
| Cross Country | Sally Kipyego | Texas Tech | Jenny Barringer, Colorado; Lindsay Donaldson, Yale; Arianna Lambie, Stanford |
| Field Hockey | Paula Infante | Maryland | Lauren Crandall, Wake Forest; Lizzy Peijs, Connecticut; Amy Stopford, Duke |
| Golf | Amanda Blumenherst | Duke | Christel Boeljon, Purdue; Stacy Lewis, Arkansas; Anna Nordquvist, Arizona State |
| Gymnastics | Courtney Kupets | Georgia | Janet Anson, Iowa State; Emily Parsons, Nebraska; Tasha Schwikert, UCLA |
| Lacrosse | Kristen Kjellman | Northwestern | Caroline Cryer, Duke; Dana Dobbie, Maryland; Mary Key Johns, Hopkins |
| Soccer | Heather O’Reilly | North Carolina | Yael Averbuch, North Carolina; Kerri Hanks, Notre Dame; India Trotter, Florida State |
| Softball | Monica Abbott | Tennessee | Katie Burkhart, Arizona State; Kaitlin Cochran, Arizona State; Caitlin Lowe, Arizona |
| Swimming & Diving | Kara Lynn Joyce | Georgia | Cassidy Krug, Stanford; Whitney Myers, Arizona; Dana Vollmer, California |
| Tennis | Audra Cohen | Miami | Megan Falcon, LSU; Lindsey Nelson, USC; Zuzana Zemenová, Baylor |
| Track & Field | Kerron Stewart | Auburn | Natasha Hastings, South Carolina; Sally Kipyego, Texas Tech; Sarah Stevens, Arizona State |
| Volleyball | Sarah Pavan | Nebraska | Foluke Akinradewo, Stanford; Nana Meriwether, UCLA; Courtney Thompson, Washington |

| Award | Winner | Sport | College |
|---|---|---|---|
| Honda Cup Collegiate Woman Athlete of the Year | Sarah Pavan | Volleyball | Nebraska |
| Honda Inspiration Award winner | Jessica Kohut | Softball | College of New Jersey |
| DII Honda Athlete of the Year | Kylee Hanavan | Soccer | Metropolitan State |
| DIII Honda Athlete of the Year | Liz Bondi | Tennis | Depauw |

== 2007–08 Winners and nominees ==
| Sport | Winner | College | Finalists |
|---|---|---|---|
| Basketball | Candace Parker | Tennessee | Sylvia Fowles, LSU; Maya Moore, Connecticut; Candice Wiggins, Stanford |
| Cross Country | Sally Kipyego | Texas Tech | Jenny Barringer, Colorado; Susan Kuijken, Florida State; Diane Nukuri, Iowa |
| Field Hockey | Rachel Dawson | North Carolina | Jennifer Long, Penn State; Katie O'Donnell, Maryland; Pam Spuehler, Boston |
| Golf | Amanda Blumenherst | Duke | Azahara Muñoz, Arizona State; Tiffany Joh, UCLA; Stacy Lewis, Arkansas |
| Gymnastics | Katie Heenan | Georgia | Lindsey Bruck, Michigan; Ashley Postell, Utah; Tabitha Yim, Stanford |
| Lacrosse | Hannah Nielsen | Northwestern | Dana Dobbie, Maryland; Kelly Kasper, Maryland; Katie Rowan, Syracuse |
| Soccer | Ashlee Pistorius | Texas A & M | Lauren Cheney, UCLA; Kristin Olsen, USC; Mami Yamaguchi, Florida State |
| Softball | Angela Tincher | Virginia Tech | Tonya Callahan, Tennessee; Kaitlin Cochran, Arizona State; Megan Gibson, Texas A & M |
| Swimming & Diving | Caroline Burckle | Florida | Lacy Nymeyer, Arizona; Rebecca Soni, Southern California; Gemma Spofforth, Florida |
| Tennis | Amanda McDowell | Georgia Tech | Ani Mijacika, Clemson; Aurelija Miseviciute, Arkansas; Zuzana Zemenová, Baylor |
| Track & Field | Jacquelyn Johnson | Arizona State | Brie Felnagle, North Carolina; Alysia Johnson, California; Sally Kipyego, Texas Tech |
| Volleyball | Foluke Akinradewo | Stanford | Christa Harmotto, Penn State; Megan Hodge, Penn State; Asia Kaczor, USC |

| Award | Winner | Sport | College |
|---|---|---|---|
| Honda Cup Collegiate Woman Athlete of the Year | Candace Parker | Basketball | Tennessee |
| Honda Inspiration Award winner | Patience Knight | Track & Field | Texas Tech |
| DII Honda Athlete of the Year | Vicky Braegelmann | Volleyball | Volleyball |
| DIII Honda Athlete of the Year | Sarah Zerzan | Cross Country | Willamette |

== 2008–09 Winners and nominees ==
| Sport | Winner | College | Finalists |
|---|---|---|---|
| Basketball | Renee Montgomery (Finalist for Honda-Broderick Cup) | Connecticut | Angel McCoughtry, Louisville; Maya Moore, Connecticut; Courtney Paris, Oklahoma |
| Cross Country | Sally Kipyego | Texas Tech | Tasmin Fanning, Virginia Tech; Brie Felnagle, North Carolina; Susan Kuijken, Florida State |
| Field hockey | Susie Rowe | Maryland | Jen Long, Penn State; Laurie Pfeiffer, Iowa; Shannon Taylor, Syracuse |
| Golf | María Hernández | Purdue | Carlota Ciganda, Arizona State; Jennifer Song, USC; Lizette Salas, USC |
| Gymnastics | Courtney Kupets | Georgia | Kristina Baskett, Utah; Ashleigh Clare-Kearny, LSU; Jessica Lopez, Denver |
| Lacrosse | Hannah Nielsen | Northwestern | Jillian Byers, Notre Dame: Amber Falcone, North Carolina; Caitlyn McFadden, Maryland |
| Soccer | Casey Nogueira | North Carolina | Kerri Hanks, Notre Dame; Brittany Bock, Notre Dame; Christina DiMartino, UCLA |
| Softball | Danielle Lawrie ((Finalist for Honda-Broderick Cup)) | Washington | Kaitlin Cochran, Arizona State; Stacey Nelson, Florida; Tammy Williams, Northwestern |
| Swimming & Diving | Dana Vollmer | California | Julia Smit, Stanford; Rebecca Soni, USC; Gemma Spofforth, Florida |
| Tennis | Mallory Cecil | Duke | Aurelija Miseviciute, Arkansas; Maria Mosolova, Northwestern; Laura Vallverdu, Miami |
| Track & Field | Jennifer Simpson ((Finalist for Honda-Broderick Cup)) | Colorado | Sarah Bowman, Tennessee; Tiffany Ofili, Michigan; Blessing Okagbare, Texas |
| Volleyball | Nicole Fawcett ((Finalist for Honda-Broderick Cup)) | Penn State | Christa Harmotto, Penn State; Destinee Hooker, Texas; Foluke Akinradewo, Stanford |

| Award | Winner | Sport | College |
|---|---|---|---|
| Honda Cup Collegiate Woman Athlete of the Year | Courtney Kupets | Gymnastics | Georgia |
| Honda Inspiration Award winner | Nicole Hester | Basketball | Drexel |
| DII Honda Athlete of the Year | Kristin Erb | Softball | Lock Haven |
| DIII Honda Athlete of the Year | Ashley Huston | Track & Field | Hardin-Simmons |

== 2009–10 Winners and nominees ==
| Sport | Winner | College | Finalists |
|---|---|---|---|
| Basketball | Maya Moore | Connecticut | Tina Charles, Connecticut; Kelsey Griffin, Nebraska; Nnemkadi Ogwumike, Stanford |
| Cross Country | Angela Bizzarri | Illinois | Susan Kuijken, Florida State; Kendra Schaaf, Washington; Catherine White, Virginia |
| Field hockey | Katie O'Donnell | Maryland | Katie Reinprecht, Princeton; LPaige Selenski, Virginia; Loren Sherer, Connecticut |
| Golf | Caroline Hedwall | Oklahoma State | Cydney Clayton, Auburn; Jennifer Johnson, Arizona State; Jennifer Song, USC |
| Gymnastics | Susan Jackson | LSU | Carly Janiga, Stanford; Brandi Personett, Penn State; Sarah Shire, Missouri |
| Lacrosse | Caitlyn McFadden | Maryland | Katrina Dowd, Northwestern; Brittany Kalkstein, Virginia; Jenn Russell, North Carolina |
| Soccer | Whitney Engen | North Carolina | Tobin Heath, North Carolina; Lauren Cheney, UCLA; Kelley O'Hara, Stanford |
| Softball | Danielle Lawrie | Washington | Chelsea Bramlett, Mississippi State; Megan Langenfeld, UCLA; Jen Yee, Georgia Tech |
| Swimming & Diving | Julia Smit | Stanford | Elaine Breeden, Stanford; Allison Schmitt, Georgia; Gemma Spofforth, Florida |
| Tennis | Laura Vallverdu | Miami | Irina Falconi, Georgia Tech; Chelsey Gullickson, Georgia; Jana Juricova, California |
| Track & Field | Lisa Koll | Iowa State | Queen Harrison, Virginia Tech; Mariam Kevkhishvili, Florida; Blessing Okagbare, UTEP |
| Volleyball | Megan Hodge | Penn State | Alisha Glass, Penn State; Hana Cutura, California; Destinee Hooker, Texas |

| Award | Winner | Sport | College |
|---|---|---|---|
| Honda Cup Collegiate Woman Athlete of the Year | Megan Hodge (tie) | Volleyball | Penn State |
| Honda Cup Collegiate Woman Athlete of the Year | Maya Moore (tie) | Basketball | Connecticut |
| Honda Inspiration Award winner | Antoinette Cobb | Track & Field | Louisiana Tech |
| DII Honda Athlete of the Year | Maggie McNamara | Volleyball | Concordia |
| DIII Honda Athlete of the Year | Marie Borner | Track & Field | Bethel |

== 2010–11 Winners and nominees ==
| Sport | Winner | College | Finalists |
|---|---|---|---|
| Basketball | Maya Moore | Connecticut | Brittney Griner, Baylor; Amber Harris, Xavier; Nnemkadi Ogwumike, Stanford |
| Cross Country | Sheila Reid | Villanova | Jordan Hasay, Oregon; Emily Infeld, Georgetown; Risper Kimaiyo, UTEP |
| Field Hockey | Katie O’Donnell | Maryland | Melissa González, Connecticut; Paige Selenski, Virginia; Kathleen Sharkey, Princeton |
| Golf | Marta Silva Zamora | LSU | Lizette Salas, USC; Kelli Shean, Arkansas; Austin Ernst, LSU |
| Gymnastics | Kayla Hoffman | Alabama | Kylee Botterman, Michigan; Brittani McCullough, UCLA; Sharaya Musser, Penn State |
| Lacrosse | Shannon Smith | Northwestern | Grace Gavin, Loyola; Sarah Mollison, Maryland; Katie Schwarzmann, Maryland |
| Soccer | Melissa Henderson | Notre Dame | Alex Morgan, California; Christen Press, Stanford; Sophie Schmidt, Portland |
| Softball | Kelsey Bruder | Florida | Ashley Hansen, Stanford; Jolene Henderson, California; Chelsea Thomas, Missouri |
| Swimming & Diving | Katinka Hosszú | USC Trojans | Allison Schmitt, Georgia; Jillian Tyler, Minnesota; Arianna Vanderpool-Wallace, Auburn. |
| Tennis | Jana Juricová | California | Lauren Embree, Florida; Maria Sanchez, USC; Stacey Tan, Stanford |
| Track & Field | Sheila Reid | Villanova | Jessica Beard, Texas A&M; Kimberlyn Duncan, LSU; Kim Williams, Florida State |
| Volleyball | Blair Brown | Penn State | Julian Faucette, Texas; Alex Jupiter, USC; Carli Lloyd, California |

| Award | Winner | Sport | College |
|---|---|---|---|
| Honda Cup Collegiate Woman Athlete of the Year | Maya Moore | Basketball | Connecticut |
| Honda Inspiration Award winner | Jessica Breland | Basketball | North Carolina |
| DII Honda Athlete of the Year | Sammy Macy | Field Hockey | UMass-Lowell |
| DIII Honda Athlete of the Year | Kendra Stern | Swimming & Diving | Amherst |

== 2011–12 Winners and nominees ==
| Sport | Winner | College | Finalists |
|---|---|---|---|
| Basketball | Brittney Griner | Baylor | Skylar Diggins, Notre Dame; Elena Delle Donne, Delaware; Nnemkadi Ogwumike, Stanford |
| Cross Country | Sheila Reid | Villanova | Jordan Hasay, Oregon; Abbey D’Agostino, Dartmouth; Emily Infeld, Georgetown |
| Field Hockey | Megan Frazer | Maryland | Chelsea Armstrong, Northwestern; Katelyn Falgowski, North Carolina; Whitney Frates, New Hampshire |
| Golf | Brooke Pancake | Alabama | Lindy Duncan, Duke; Chirapat Jao-Javanil, Oklahoma; Emily Tubert, Arkansas |
| Gymnastics | Kytra Hunter | Florida | Amy Glass, Boise State; Jaime Pisani, Arkansas; Geralen Stack-Eaton, Alabama |
| Lacrosse | Taylor Thornton | Northwestern | Brittany Dashiell, Florida; Sarah Plumb, Dartmouth; Katie Schwarzmann, Maryland |
| Soccer | Teresa Noyola | Stanford | Lindsay Taylor, Stanford; Maya Hayes, Penn State |
| Softball | Keilani Ricketts | Oklahoma | Katelyn Boyd, Arizona State; Jolene Henderson, California; Jackie Traina, Alabama |
| Swimming & Diving | Caitlin Leverenz | California | Katinka Hosszu, USC; Megan Romano, Georgia; Breeja Larson, Texas A&M |
| Tennis | Nicole Gibbs | Stanford | Mallory Burdette, Stanford; Beatrice Capra, Duke; Allie Will, Florida |
| Track & Field | Kimberlyn Duncan | LSU | Brigetta Barrett, Arizona; Christina Manning, Ohio State; Jeneva McCall, Southern Illinois |
| Volleyball | Alex Jupiter | USC | Rachael Adams, Texas; Kanani Danielson, Hawaii; Kelly Murphy, Florida State |

| Award | Winner | Sport | College |
|---|---|---|---|
| Honda Cup Collegiate Woman Athlete of the Year | Brittney Griner | Basketball | Baylor |
| Honda Inspiration Award winner | Elena Delle Donne | Basketball | Delaware |
| DII Honda Athlete of the Year | Kari Daugherty | Basketball | Ashland |
| DIII Honda Athlete of the Year | Stacey Hagensen | Softball | Pacific Lutheran |

== 2012–13 Winners and nominees ==
| Sport | Winner | College | Finalists |
|---|---|---|---|
| Basketball | Elena Delle Donne | Delaware | Skylar Diggins, Notre Dame; Brittney Griner, Baylor; Chiney Ogwumike, Stanford |
| Cross Country | Betsy Saina | Iowa State | Jordan Hasay, Oregon; Abbey D’Agostino, Dartmouth; Aliphine Tuliamuk-Bolton, Wichita State |
| Field Hockey | Katie Reinprecht | Princeton | Chelsea Armstrong, Northwestern; Megan Frazer, Maryland; Paige Selenski, Virginia |
| Golf | Annie Park | USC | Lindy Duncan, Duke; Stephanie Meadow, Alabama; Paula Reto, Purdue |
| Gymnastics | Bridget Sloan | Florida | Vanessa Zamarripa, UCLA; Rheagan Courville, LSU; Alina Weinstein, Illinois |
| Lacrosse | Kara Cannizzaro | North Carolina | Alex Aust, Maryland; Becca Block, Syracuse; Katie Schwarzmann, Maryland |
| Soccer | Crystal Dunn | North Carolina | Alina Garciamendez-Rowold, Stanford; Christine Nairn, Penn State; Ines Jaurena, Florida State |
| Softball | Keilani Ricketts | Oklahoma | Lauren Chamberlain, Oklahoma; Amber Freeman, Arizona State; Lauren Gibson, Tennessee |
| Swimming and Diving | Allison Schmitt | Georgia | Elizabeth Beisel, Florida; Breeja Larson, Texas A&M; Elizabeth Pelton, California |
| Tennis | Nicole Gibbs | Stanford | Lauren Embree, Florida; Sabrina Santamaria, Southern California; Mary Weatherholt, Nebraska |
| Track and Field | Kimberlyn Duncan | LSU | Brigetta Barrett, Arizona; Kori Carter, Stanford; Andrea Geubelle, Kansas |
| Volleyball | Alaina Bergsma | Oregon | Haley Eckerman, Texas; Lauren Plum, Oregon; Ariel Scott, Penn State |

| Award | Winner | Sport | College |
|---|---|---|---|
| Honda Cup Collegiate Woman Athlete of the Year | Keilani Ricketts | Softball | Oklahoma |
| Honda Inspiration Award winner | Andrea "Drey" Mingo | Basketball | Purdue |
| DII Honda Athlete of the Year | Kari Daugherty | Basketball | Ashland |
| DIII Honda Athlete of the Year | Allyson Fournier | Softball | Tufts |

== 2013–14 Winners and nominees ==
| Sport | Winner | College | Finalists |
|---|---|---|---|
| Basketball | Breanna Stewart | Connecticut | Kayla McBride, Notre Dame; Alyssa Thomas, Maryland; Chiney Ogwumike, Stanford; Odyssey Sims, Baylor |
| Cross country | Abbey D'Agostino | Dartmouth | Katie Avory, Iona; Emma Bates, Boise State; Aisling Cuffe, Stanford |
| Field hockey | Marie Elena Bolles | Connecticut | Rachael Mack, Michigan; Jill Witmer, Maryland; Emily Wold, North Carolina |
| Golf | Céline Boutier | Duke | Doris Chen, USC; Alison Lee, UCLA; Annie Park, USC |
| Gymnastics | Kim Jacob | Alabama | Katherine Grable, Arkansas; Bridget Sloan, Florida; Emily Wong, Nebraska |
| Lacrosse | Taylor Cummings | Maryland | Shannon Gilroy, Florida; Alyssa Murray, Syracuse; Kayla Treanor, Syracuse |
| Soccer | Abby Dahlkemper | UCLA | Morgan Brian, Virginia; Crystal Dunn, North Carolina; Kassey Kallman, Florida State |
| Softball | Madison Shipman | Tennessee | Cheridan Hawkins, Oregon; Maddie O'Brien, Florida State; Sierra Romero, Michigan |
| Swimming and diving | Felicia Lee | Stanford | Maya DiRado, Stanford; Missy Franklin, California; Breeja Larson, Texas A&M; Brittany MacLean, Georgia |
| Tennis | Robin Anderson | UCLA | Lynn Chi, California; Danielle Collins, Virginia; Jamie Loeb, North Carolina |
| Track and field | Sharika Nelvis | Arkansas State | Courtney Okolo, Texas; Jenna Prandini, Oregon; Kendell Williams, Georgia |
| Volleyball | Krista Vansant | Washington | Haley Eckerman, Texas; Kelsey Robinson, Nebraska; Carly Wopat, Stanford |

| Award | Winner | Sport | College |
|---|---|---|---|
| Honda Cup Collegiate Woman Athlete of the Year | Kim Jacob | Gymnastics | Alabama |
| Honda Inspiration Award winner | Arin Gilliland | Soccer | Kentucky |
| DII Honda Athlete of the Year | Lauren Battista | Basketball | Bentley |
| DIII Honda Athlete of the Year | Christy Cazzolla | Track & Field | Wisconsin-Oshkosh |

== 2014–15 Winners and nominees ==
| Sport | Winner | College | Finalists |
|---|---|---|---|
| Basketball | Breanna Stewart | Connecticut | Jewell Loyd, Notre Dame; Tiffany Mitchell, South Carolina; Kaleena Mosqueda-Lewis, Connecticut |
| Cross country | Kate Avery | Iona | Emma Bates, Boise State; Sarah Disanza, Wisconsin; Rachele Schulist, Michigan State |
| Field hockey | Paula Heuser | Albany | Laura Gebhart, Penn State; Kelsey Harbin, Stanford; Roisin Upton, Connecticut |
| Golf | Emma Talley | Alabama | Bronte Law, UCLA; Gaby López, Arkansas; Leona Maguire, Duke |
| Gymnastics | Kytra Hunter | Florida | Georgia Dabritz, Utah; Lindsay Mable, Minnesota; Samantha Peszek, UCLA |
| Lacrosse | Taylor Cummings | Maryland | Megan Douty, Maryland, Shannon Gilroy, Florida; Kayla Treanor, Syracuse |
| Soccer | Sam Mewis | UCLA | Morgan Brian, University of Virginia; Dagný Brynjarsdóttir, Florida State University; Shea Groom, Texas A&M University |
| Softball | Lauren Haegar | Florida | Lauren Chamberlain, Oklahoma; Cheridan Hawkins, Oregon; Sierra Romero, Michigan |
| Swimming & Diving | Missy Franklin | California | Simone Manuel, Stanford; Leah Smith, Virginia; Kelsi Worrell, Louisville |
| Tennis | Robin Anderson | UCLA | Brooke Austin, Florida; Jamie Loeb, North Carolina; Carol Zhao, Stanford |
| Track & Field | Jenna Prandini | Oregon | Kendra Harrison, Kentucky; Akela Jones, Kansas State; Demi Payne, Stephen F. Austin |
| Volleyball | Krista Vansant | Washington | Inky Ajanaku, Stanford; Lauren Carlini, Wisconsin; Micha Hancock, Penn State |

| Award | Winner | Sport | College |
|---|---|---|---|
| Honda Cup Collegiate Woman Athlete of the Year | Missy Franklin | Swimming & Diving | California |
| Honda Inspiration Award winner | Imani McGee-Stafford | Basketball | Texas |
| DII Honda Athlete of the Year | Rachel Dickinson | Field hockey | Millersville (PA) |
| DIII Honda Athlete of the Year | Allyson Fournier | Softball | Tufts |

== 2015–16 Winners and nominees ==
| Sport | Winner | College | Finalists |
|---|---|---|---|
| Basketball | Breanna Stewart | Connecticut | Moriah Jefferson, Connecticut; Brianna Turner, Notre Dame; A'ja Wilson, South Carolina |
| Cross country | Molly Seidel | Notre Dame | Courtney Frerichs, New Mexico; Allie Ostrander, Boise State; Dominique Scott, Arkansas |
| Field hockey | Alyssa Manley | Syracuse | Lauren Blazing, Duke; Sarah Sprink, Maryland; Roisin Upton, Connecticut |
| Golf | Virginia Elena Carta | Duke | Katelyn Dambaugh, South Carolina; Cheyenne Knight, Alabama; Bronte Law, UCLA |
| Gymnastics | Bridget Sloan | Florida | Lindsay Mable, Minnesota; Nina McGee, Denver; Elizabeth Price, Stanford |
| Lacrosse | Taylor Cummings | Maryland | Alice Mercer, Maryland; Barbara Sullivan, Notre Dame; Kayla Treanor, Syracuse |
| Soccer | Raquel Rodríguez | Penn State | Kadeisha Buchanan, West Virginia; Rachel Daly, St. John's; Emily Sonnett, Virginia |
| Softball | Sierra Romero | Michigan | Lexie Elkins, Louisiana at Lafayette; Megan Good, James Madison; Haylie McCleney, Alabama |
| Swimming & Diving | Kelsi Worrell | Louisville | Ella Eastin, Stanford; Lilly King, Indiana; Olivia Smoliga, Georgia |
| Tennis | Danielle Collins | Virginia | Hayley Carter, North Carolina; Francesca Di Lorenzo, Ohio State; Luisa Stefani, Pepperdine |
| Track & Field | Courtney Okolo | Texas | Keturah Orji, Georgia; Raven Saunders, Ole Miss; Kendell Williams, Georgia |
| Volleyball | Samantha Bricio | USC | Lauren Carlini, Wisconsin; Daly Santana, Minnesota; Haleigh Washington, Penn State |

| Award | Winner | Sport | College |
|---|---|---|---|
| Honda Cup Collegiate Woman Athlete of the Year | Breanna Stewart | Basketball | Connecticut |
| Honda Inspiration Award winner | Emily Fogle | Swimming & Diving | Purdue |
| DII Honda Athlete of the Year | Emily Oren | Track & Field | Hillsdale |
| DIII Honda Athlete of the Year | Sydney Moss | Basketball | Thomas More |

== 2016–17 Winners and nominees ==
| Sport | Winner | College | Finalists |
|---|---|---|---|
| Basketball | Kelsey Plum | Washington | Napheesa Collier, Connecticut; Kelsey Mitchell, Ohio State; A'ja Wilson, South Carolina |
| Cross Country | Karissa Schweizer | Missouri | Erin Finn, Michigan; Katie Rainsberger, Oregon; Anna Rohrer, Notre Dame |
| Field Hockey | Greta Nauck | Delaware | Paula Heuser, Albany; Welma Luus, Maryland; Charlotte Veitner, Connecticut |
| Golf | Monica Vaughn | Arizona State | Jennifer Kupcho, Wake Forest; Andrea Lee, Stanford; Leona Maguire, Duke |
| Gymnastics | Alex McMurtry | Florida | Chayse Capps, Oklahoma; Ashleigh Gnat, LSU; Maggie Nichols, Oklahoma |
| Lacrosse | Zoe Stukenberg | Maryland | Kenzie Kent, Boston College; Marie McCool, North Carolina; Kylie Ohlmiller, Stony Brook |
| Soccer | Kadeisha Buchanan | West Virginia | Savannah McCaskill, South Carolina; Ashley Hatch, Brigham Young; Cassie Miller, Florida State |
| Softball | Kelly Barnhill | Florida | Megan Good, James Madison; Sarah Goenewegen, Minnesota; DJ Sanders, Louisiana Lafayette |
| Swimming & Diving | Katie Ledecky | Stanford | Kathleen Baker, California; Lilly King, Indiana; Simone Manuel, Stanford |
| Tennis | Danielle Collins | Virginia | Hayley Carter, North Carolina; Francesca Di Lorenzo, Ohio State; Luisa Stefani, Pepperdine |
| Track & Field | Kendell Williams | Georgia | Maggie Ewen, Arizona State; Keturah Orji, Georgia; Raevyn Rogers, Oregon |
| Volleyball | Inky Ajanaku | Stanford | Ebony Nwanebu, Texas; Kadie Rolfzen, Nebraska; Sarah Wilhite, Minnesota |

| Award | Winner | Sport | College |
|---|---|---|---|
| Honda Cup Collegiate Woman Athlete of the Year | Katie Ledecky | Swimming & Diving | Stanford |
| Honda Inspiration Award winner | Nicole Stafford | Swimming & Diving | Stanford |
| DII Honda Athlete of the Year | Carly Muscaro | Track & Field | Merrimack |
| DIII Honda Athlete of the Year | Lizzy Crist | Soccer | Washington (St. Louis) |

== 2017–18 Winners and nominees ==
| Sport | Winner | College | Finalists |
|---|---|---|---|
| Basketball | A'ja Wilson | South Carolina | Sabrina Ionescu, Oregon; Kelsey Mitchell, Ohio State; Katie Lou Samuelson, Connecticut |
| Cross Country | Ednah Kurgat | New Mexico | Amy-Eloise Neale, Washington; Allie Ostrander, Boise State; Charlotte Taylor, San Francisco |
| Field Hockey | Charlotte Veitner | Connecticut | Alyssa Chillano, Duke; Ashley Hoffman, North Carolina; Lein Holsboer, Maryland |
| Golf | Jennifer Kupcho | Wake Forest | Andrea Lee, Stanford; Lauren Stephenson, Alabama; Lilia Vu, UCLA |
| Gymnastics | Christine Peng-Peng Lee | UCLA | Sarah Finnegan, LSU; Elizabeth Price, Stanford; Maggie Nichols, Oklahoma |
| Lacrosse | Sam Apuzzo | Boston College | Kristen Gaudian, James Madison; Marie McCool, North Carolina; Kylie Ohlmiller, Stony Brook |
| Soccer | Andi Sullivan | Stanford | Imani Dorsey, Duke; Jessie Fleming, UCLA; Savannah McCaskill, South Carolina |
| Softball | Rachel Garcia | UCLA | Kelly Barnhill, Florida; Amanda Lorenz, Florida; Paige Parker, Oklahoma |
| Swimming & Diving | Simone Manuel | Stanford | Ella Eastin, Stanford; Katie Ledecky, Stanford; Lilly King, Indiana |
| Tennis | Arianne Hartono | Ole Miss | Makenna Jones, North Carolina; Astra Sharma, Vanderbilt; Bianca Turati, Texas |
| Track & Field | Maggie Ewen | Arizona State | Lynna Irby, Georgia; Keturah Orji, Georgia; Karissa Schweizer, Missouri |
| Volleyball | Rhamat Alhassan | Florida | Simone Lee, Penn State; Kathryn Plummer, Stanford; Haleigh Washington, Penn State |

| Award | Winner | Sport | College |
|---|---|---|---|
| Honda Cup Collegiate Woman Athlete of the Year | Simone Manuel | Swimming & Diving | Stanford |
| Honda Inspiration Award winner | Megan Cunningham | Track & Field/Cross Country | Missouri |
| DII Honda Athlete of the Year | Caroline Kurgat | Track & Field | Alaska Anchorage |
| DIII Honda Athlete of the Year | Eudice Chong | Tennis | Wesleyan |

== 2018–19 Winners and nominees ==
| Sport | Winner | College | Finalists |
|---|---|---|---|
| Basketball | Megan Gustafson | Iowa | Asia Durr, Louisville; Sabrina Ionescu, Oregon; Teaira McCowan, Mississippi State |
| Cross Country | Dani Jones | Colorado | Jessica Hull, Oregon; Weini Kelati, New Mexico; Alicia Monson, Wisconsin |
| Field Hockey | Ashley Hoffman | North Carolina | Paula Portugal, Miami (OH); Anna Willocks, Saint Joseph's; Elise Wong, Princeton |
| Golf | María Fassi | Arkansas | Jaravee Boonchant, Duke; Frida Kinhult, Florida State; Albane Valenzuela, Stanford |
| Gymnastics | Maggie Nichols | Oklahoma | Brenna Dowell, Oklahoma; Sarah Finnegan, LSU; Kyla Ross, UCLA |
| Lacrosse | Megan Taylor | Maryland | Sam Apuzzo, Boston College; Dempsey Arsenault, Boston College; Selena Lasota, Northwestern |
| Soccer | Natalia Kuikka | Florida State | Julia Ashley, North Carolina; Jordan DiBiasi, Stanford; Caitlin Farrell, Georgetown |
| Softball | Rachel Garcia | UCLA | Abbey Cheek, Kentucky; Caleigh Clifton, Oklahoma; Amber Fiser, Minnesota |
| Swimming & Diving | Lilly King | Indiana | Mallory Comerford, Louisville; Beata Nelson, Wisconsin; Abbey Weitzeil, California |
| Tennis | Estela Perez-Somarriba | Miami (FL) | Kate Fahey, Michigan; Katarina Jokic, Georgia; Ingrid Gamarra Martins, South Carolina |
| Track & Field | Yanis David | Florida | Janeek Brown, Arkansas; Allie Ostrander, Boise State; Sha'Carri Richardson, LSU |
| Volleyball | Kathryn Plummer | Stanford | Roni Jones-Perry, BYU; Jordyn Poulter, Illinois; Samantha Seliger-Swenson, Minnesota |

| Award | Winner | Sport | College |
|---|---|---|---|
| Honda Cup Collegiate Woman Athlete of the Year | Rachel Garcia | Softball | UCLA |
| Honda Inspiration Award winner | Jenna Fessler | Volleyball | Thomas More |
| DII Honda Athlete of the Year | Taylor Reiss | Volleyball | Southwest Minnesota State |
| DIII Honda Athlete of the Year | Madison Temple | Basketball | Thomas More |

== 2019–20 Winners and nominees ==
Due to COVID-19 issues, sports seasons were affected. The four fall sports (cross country, field hockey, soccer and volleyball) were able to conclude both their regular season and championships. The three winter sports (swimming & diving, basketball and gymnastics) were able to complete their regular seasons, but championships were canceled. The five spring sports (tennis, golf, lacrosse, softball and track & field) were unable to hold their regular season or championships.

2019–20
| Sport | Season | Regular season | Championships | Honda Sports Award |
|---|---|---|---|---|
| Cross Country | Fall | Completed | Completed | Announced |
| Field Hockey | Fall | Completed | Completed | Announced |
| Soccer | Fall | Completed | Completed | Announced |
| Volleyball | Fall | Completed | Completed | Announced |
| Swimming & Diving | Winter | Completed | Cancelled | Announced |
| Basketball | Winter | Completed | Canceled | Announced |
| Gymnastics | Winter | Completed | Canceled | Announced |
| Tennis | Spring | Canceled | Canceled | No Award |
| Golf | Spring | Canceled | Canceled | No Award |
| Lacrosse | Spring | Canceled | Canceled | No Award |
| Softball | Spring | Canceled | Canceled | No Award |
| Track & Field | Spring | Canceled | Canceled | No Award |

The NCAA decisions about cancellations affected the Collegiate Women Sports Awards process.

Each of the fall sports could proceed as usual. The winter sports had a regular season without championships, but the organization concluded it could select nominees and winners based upon regular season results. However, with no regular season or championships for the spring sports, the organization was forced to conclude that no awards could be issued for those five sports.

The winners of each of the twelve sports are considered for both the Top Three award and the overall Honda Cup—but because not all sports are represented, the decision was made not to do selections for the Top Three or overall Honda Cup. In addition, the DII and DIII award is across all sports. While nominees in some sports were selected, not all sports are represented, so there will be no DII or DIII award winner for this year. The Inspiration Award will continue as usual.

| Sport | Winner | College | Finalists |
|---|---|---|---|
| Basketball | Sabrina Ionescu | Oregon | Dana Evans, Louisville; Tyasha Harris, South Carolina; Aari McDonald, Arizona |
| Cross Country | Weini Kelati | New Mexico | Katie Izzo, Arkansas; Taylor Werner, Arkansas; Alicia Monson, Wisconsin |
| Field Hockey | Erin Matson | North Carolina | Svea Boker, UConn; Mercedes Pastor, Louisville; Clara Roth, Princeton |
| Golf | No award due to COVID-19 | | |
| Gymnastics | Kyla Ross | UCLA | Maggie Nichols, Oklahoma; Lexy Ramler, Minnesota; Trinity Thomas, Florida |
| Lacrosse | No award due to COVID-19 | | |
| Soccer | Catarina Macario | Stanford | Mikayla Colohan, BYU; Jessie Fleming, UCLA; Emily Fox, North Carolina |
| Softball | No award due to COVID-19 | | |
| Swimming & Diving | Abbey Weitzeil | California | Erika Brown, Tennessee; Maggie MacNeil, Michigan; Beata Nelson, Wisconsin |
| Tennis | No award due to COVID-19 | | |
| Track & Field | No award due to COVID-19 | | |
| Volleyball | Jenna Gray | Stanford | Yossiana Pressley, Baylor; Dana Rettke, Wisconsin; Jordan Thompson, Cincinnati |

| Award | Winner | Sport | College |
|---|---|---|---|
| Honda Cup Collegiate Woman Athlete of the Year | No award due to COVID-19 | | |
| Honda Inspiration Award winner | Jazzy Richards | Soccer | Oklahoma |
| DII Honda Athlete of the Year | No award due to COVID-19 | | |
| DIII Honda Athlete of the Year | No award due to COVID-19 | | |

== 2020–21 winners and nominees ==
COVID-19 continued to affect college sports seasons in 2020–21. Of the three NCAA divisions, the only one that held championships in any fall sport (cross country, field hockey, soccer, volleyball) was Division I, and even then all of those championship events were held in spring 2021 instead of fall 2020. Divisions II and III held no championships in any fall sport. Of the three winter sports covered by the Honda Award program, the only one whose regular season and championship was held as scheduled was gymnastics, a sport with a single championship open to members of all NCAA divisions. In both basketball and swimming & diving, Divisions I and II held their regular seasons and championship events (although D-II had a reduced field), but most D-III members opted out of winter sports entirely, leading to that division's championships being canceled. Only the five spring sports (tennis, golf, lacrosse, softball, track & field) were largely unaffected, with all divisions holding regular seasons and championships in each sport.

Because of continued disruptions in D-II and D-III, the presenters concluded that no athlete of the year awards would be presented in those divisions.

| Sport | Winner | College | Finalists |
|---|---|---|---|
| Basketball | NaLyssa Smith | Baylor | Dana Evans, Louisville; Naz Hillmon, Michigan; Rhyne Howard, Kentucky |
| Cross Country | Mercy Chelangat | Alabama | Amaris Tyynismaa, Alabama; Mahala Norris, Air Force; Taylor Roe, Oregon State |
| Field Hockey | Erin Matson | North Carolina | Sophie Hamilton, UConn; Megan Schneider, Louisville; Corinne Zanolli, Stanford |
| Golf | Rachel Heck | Stanford | Angelina Ye, Stanford; Emma Spitz, UCLA; Maja Stark, Oklahoma State |
| Gymnastics | Anastasia Webb | Oklahoma | Luisa Blanco, Alabama; Lynnzee Brown, Denver; Lexy Ramler, Minnesota |
| Lacrosse | Charlotte North | Boston College | Lizzie Colson, Maryland; Ally Kennedy, Stony Brook; Taylor Moreno, North Carolina |
| Soccer | Alex Loera | Santa Clara | Emily Alvarado, TCU; Jaelin Howell, Florida State; Ally Schlegel, Penn State |
| Softball | Rachel Garcia | UCLA | Montana Fouts, Alabama; Dejah Mulipola, Arizona; Sami Williams, Iowa State |
| Swimming & Diving | Sarah Bacon | Minnesota | Sophie Hansson, NC State; Maggie MacNeil, Michigan; Paige Madden, Virginia |
| Tennis | Sara Daavettila | North Carolina | Katarina Jokic, Georgia; Emma Navarro, Virginia; Estela Pérez Somarriba, Miami |
| Track & Field | Anna Cockrell | USC | Tara Davis, Texas; Tyra Gittens, Texas A&M; Athing Mu, Texas A&M |
| Volleyball | Madison Lilley | Kentucky | Logan Eggleston, Texas; Dana Rettke, Wisconsin; Stephanie Samedy, Minnesota |

| Award | Winner | Sport | College |
|---|---|---|---|
| Honda Cup Collegiate Woman Athlete of the Year | Rachel Garcia | Softball | UCLA |
| Honda Inspiration Award winner | Asjia O'Neal | Volleyball | Texas |
| DII Honda Athlete of the Year | No award due to COVID-19 | | |
| DIII Honda Athlete of the Year | No award due to COVID-19 | | |

== 2021–22 winners and nominees ==
| Sport | Winner | College | Finalists |
|---|---|---|---|
| Basketball | Aliyah Boston | South Carolina | Caitlin Clark, Iowa; Rhyne Howard, Kentucky; NaLyssa Smith, Baylor |
| Cross Country | Whittni Orton | BYU | Mercy Chelangat, Alabama; Cailie Logue, Iowa State; Ceili McCabe, West Virginia |
| Field Hockey | Jill Bolton | Liberty | Brooke DeBerdine, Maryland; Erin Matson, North Carolina; Maddy Murphy, Iowa |
| Golf | Rose Zhang | Stanford | Alexandra Försterling, Arizona State; Ingrid Lindblad, LSU; Natasha Andrea Oon, San Jose State |
| Gymnastics | Trinity Thomas | Florida | Jade Carey, Oregon State; Sunisa Lee, Auburn; Lexy Ramler, Minnesota |
| Lacrosse | Jamie Ortega | North Carolina | Ally Mastroianni, North Carolina; Charlotte North, Boston College; Emily Sterling, Maryland |
| Soccer | Jaelin Howell | Florida State | Mikayla Colohan, BYU; Gabby Provenzano, Rutgers; Kelsey Turnbow, Santa Clara |
| Softball | Jocelyn Alo | Oklahoma | Georgina Corrick, South Florida; Danielle Gibson, Arkansas; Baylee Klingler, Washington |
| Swimming & Diving | Kate Douglass | Virginia | Alexandra Walsh, Virginia; Katharine Berkoff, NC State; Tarrin Gilliland, Indiana |
| Tennis | Peyton Stearns | Texas | Eryn Cayetano, USC; Sarah Hamner, South Carolina; Emma Navarro, Virginia |
| Track & Field | Abby Steiner | Kentucky | Anna Hall, Florida; Jasmine Moore, Tennessee; Camryn Rogers, California |
| Volleyball | Dana Rettke | Wisconsin | Tori Dilfer, Louisville; Logan Eggleston, Texas; Stephanie Samedy, Minnesota |

| Award | Winner | Sport | College |
|---|---|---|---|
| Honda Cup Collegiate Woman Athlete of the Year | Aliyah Boston | Basketball | South Carolina |
| Honda Inspiration Award winner | Lauren Thibodeau | Golf | Louisville |
| DII Honda Athlete of the Year | Jazmin Petrantonio | Field hockey | Shippensburg |
| DIII Honda Athlete of the Year | Erin Nicholas | Field hockey | Middlebury |

== 2022–23 winners and nominees ==
| Sport | Winner | College | Finalists |
|---|---|---|---|
| Basketball | Caitlin Clark | Iowa | Aliyah Boston, South Carolina; Mackenzie Holmes, Indiana; Maddy Siegrist, Villanova |
| Cross Country | Katelyn Tuohy | NC State | Kesley Chmiel, NC State; Elise Stearns, Northern Arizona; Parker Valby, Florida |
| Field Hockey | Erin Matson | North Carolina | Bente Baekers, Northwestern; Sophia Gladieux, Penn State; Beth Yeager, Princeton |
| Golf | Rose Zhang | Stanford | Jenny Bae, Georgia; Ingrid Lindblad, LSU; Julia Lopez Ramirez, Mississippi State University; |
| Gymnastics | Trinity Thomas | Florida | Haleigh Bryant, LSU; Jade Carey, Oregon State; Raena Worley, Kentucky |
| Lacrosse | Izzy Scane | Northwestern | Delaney Sweitzer, Syracuse; Sam Thacker, Denver; Jillian Wilson, Loyola Maryland |
| Soccer | Lilly Reale | UCLA | Tori Hansen, North Carolina; Jenna Nighswonger, Florida State; Reyna Reyes, Alabama |
| Softball | Montana Fouts | Alabama | Megan Faraimo, UCLA; Kiki Milloy, Tennessee; Ashley Rogers, Tennessee |
| Swimming & Diving | Kate Douglass | Virginia | Gretchen Walsh, Virginia; Maggie MacNeil, North Carolina; Aranza Vazquez, North Carolina |
| Tennis | Fiona Crawley | North Carolina | Lea Ma, Georgia; Mary Stoiana, Texas A&M; Fangran Tian, UCLA |
| Track & Field | Jasmine Moore | Florida | Julien Alfred, Texas; Ackera Nugent, Arkansas; Britton Wilson, Arkansas |
| Volleyball | Logan Eggleston | Texas | Gabby Blossom, San Diego; Claire Chaussee, Louisville; Kendall Kip, Stanford |

| Award | Winner | Sport | College |
|---|---|---|---|
| Honda Cup Collegiate Woman Athlete of the Year | Caitlin Clark | Basketball | Iowa |
| Honda Inspiration Award winner | Mahalia White | Volleyball | North Florida |
| DII Honda Athlete of the Year | Brooke Olson | Basketball | Minnesota Duluth |
| DIII Honda Athlete of the Year | Jane Earley | Lacrosse | Middlebury |

== 2023–24 winners and nominees ==
| Sport | Winner | College | Finalists |
|---|---|---|---|
| Basketball | Caitlin Clark | Iowa | Paige Bueckers, Connecticut; Elizabeth Kitley, Virginia Tech; JuJu Watkins, Southern California |
| Cross Country | Parker Valby | Florida | Doris Lemngole and Hilda Olemomoi, Alabama; Olivia Markezich, Notre Dame |
| Field Hockey | Ryleigh Heck | North Carolina | Iris Langejans, Rutgers; Annabel Skubisz and Lauren Wadas, Northwestern |
| Golf | Ingrid Lindblad | Louisiana State | Adela Cernousek (Texas A&M), Julia López Ramirez (Mississippi State), Lottie Woad (Florida State) |
| Gymnastics | Haleigh Bryant | Louisiana State | Jordan Bowers (Oklahoma), Jade Carey (Oregon State), Leanne Wong (Florida) |
| Lacrosse | Izzy Scane | Northwestern | Chase Boyle (Loyola), Madison Taylor (Northwestern), Jackie Wolak (Notre Dame) |
| Soccer | Onyi Echegini | Florida State | Jasmine Aikey, Stanford; Hannah Anderson, Texas Tech; Brecken Mozingo, Brigham Young |
| Softball | NiJaree Canady | Stanford | Reese Atwood (Texas), Claire Davidson (Duke), Jocelyn Erickson (Florida) |
| Swimming & Diving | Gretchen Walsh | Virginia | Bella Sims, Florida; Aranza Vazquez Montano, North Carolina; Alex Walsh, Virginia |
| Tennis | Mary Stoiana | Texas A&M | Alexa Noel (Miami), Amelia Rajecki (NC State), Darja Vidmanová (Georgia) |
| Track & Field | Parker Valby | Florida | McKenzie Long (Mississippi), Maia Ramsden (Harvard), Jaida Ross (Oregon) |
| Volleyball | Madisen Skinner | Texas | Merritt Beason, Nebraska; Rachel Fairbanks, Pittsburgh; Sarah Franklin, Wisconsin |

| Award | Winner | Sport | College |
|---|---|---|---|
| Honda Cup Collegiate Woman Athlete of the Year | Caitlin Clark | Basketball | Iowa |
| Honda Inspiration Award winner | Aaliyah Gayles | Basketball | Southern California |
| DII Honda Athlete of the Year | Denisha Cartwright | Track & Field | Minnesota State University |
| DIII Honda Athlete of the Year | Tristen Maddox | Softball | East Texas Baptist University |

== 2024–25 winners and nominees ==
| Sport | Winner | College | Finalists |
|---|---|---|---|
| Basketball | Paige Bueckers | Connecticut | Madison Booker,Texas; Hannah Hildalgo, Notre Dame;JuJu Watkins, USC |
| Cross Country | Doris Lemngole | Alabama | Amy Bunnage, Stanford; Pamela Kosgei, New Mexico; Hilda Olemomoi, Florida |
| Field Hockey | Maddie Zimmer | Northwestern | Manu Ghigliotti, Saint Joseph's; Sophia Gladieux, Penn State; Ryleigh Heck, North Carolina |
| Golf | Maria José Marin | Arkansas | Kiara Romero, Oregon; Mirabel Ting, Florida State; Lottie Woad, Florida State |
| Gymnastics | Jordan Bowers | Oklahoma | Jade Carey, Oregon State; Audrey Davis, Oklahoma; Aleah Finnegan, LSU |
| Lacrosse | Chloe Humphrey | North Carolina | Rachel Clark, Boston College; Shea Dolce, Boston College; Madison Taylor, Northwestern |
| Soccer | Kate Faasse | North Carolina | Maggie Graham, Duke; Caiya Hanks, Wake Forest; Taylor Huff, Florida State |
| Softball | NiJaree Canady | Texas Tech | Jordyn Bahl, Nebraska; Bri Ellis, Arkansas; Karlyn Pickens, Tennessee |
| Swimming & Diving | Gretchen Walsh | Virginia | Jillian Cox, Texas; Claire Curzan, Virginia; Chiara Pellacani, Miami |
| Tennis | Darja Vidmanová | Georgia | DJ Bennett, Auburn; Mary Stoiana, Texas A&M; Elza Tomase, Tennessee |
| Track & Field | Aaliyah Butler | Georgia | Doris Lemngole, Alabama; Hana Moll, Washington; Savannah Sutherland, Michigan |
| Volleyball | Olivia Babcock | Pittsburgh | Lexi Rodriguez, Nebraska; Sarah Franklin, Wisconsin; Brooklyn DeLeye, Kentucky |

| Award | Winner | Sport | College |
|---|---|---|---|
| Honda Cup Collegiate Woman Athlete of the Year | Gretchen Walsh | Swimming | Virginia |
| Honda Inspiration Award winner | Sidney Barbier | Nordic Ski | Denver |
| DII Honda Athlete of the Year | Alexis Brown | Track & Field | Lenoir-Rhyne |
| DIII Honda Athlete of the Year | Olivia Foley | Volleyball | Juniata College |

== 2025–26 winners and nominees ==
| Sport | Winner | College | Finalists |
|---|---|---|---|
| Basketball | Lauren Betts | UCLA | Mikayla Blakes, Vanderbilt; Madison Booker, Texas; Sarah Strong, UConn |
| Cross Country | Doris Lemngole | Alabama | Riley Chamberlain, BYU; Jane Hedengren, BYU; Hilda Olemomoi, Florida |
| Field Hockey | Maddie Zimmer | Northwestern | Bronte-May Brough, Harvard; Bo van Kempen, Syracuse; Beth Yeager, Princeton |
| Golf | Farah O'Keefe | Texas | Megha Ganne, Stanford; Paula Martín Sampedro, Stanford; Maria José Marin, Arkansas |
| Gymnastics | Faith Torrez | Oklahoma | Jordan Chiles, UCLA; Kailin Chio, LSU; Anna Roberts, Stanford |
| Lacrosse | Madison Taylor | Northwestern | Brigid Duffy, Army; Chloe Humphrey, North Carolina; Reagan O’Brien, Johns Hopkins |
| Soccer | Jordynn Dudley | Florida State | Jasmine Aikey, Stanford; Seven Castain, TCU; Izzy Engle, Notre Dame |
| Softball | Jordy Frahm | Nebraska | Megan Grant, UCLA; Maya Johnson, Belmont; Isa Torres, Florida State |
| Swimming & Diving | Torri Huske | Stanford | Lucy Bell, Stanford; Claire Curzan, Virginia; Sophie Verzyl, South Carolina |
| Tennis | Lucciana Pérez | Texas A&M | Reese Brantmeier, North Carolina; Carmen Herea, Texas; Luciana Perry, Ohio State |
| Track & Field | Axelina Johansson | Nebraska | Adaejah Hodge, Georgia; Dejanea Oakley, Georgia; Sanu Jallow-Lockhart, Arkansas |
| Volleyball | Olivia Babcock | Pittsburgh | Mimi Colyer, Wisconsin; Eva Hudson, Kentucky; Bergen Reilly, Nebraska |

| Award | Winner | Sport | College |
|---|---|---|---|
| Honda Cup Collegiate Woman Athlete of the Year | Lauren Betts | Basketball | UCLA |
| Honda Inspiration Award winner | Yvonne Lee | Basketball | Catawba |
| DII Honda Athlete of the Year | Natalie Bremer | Basketball | Minnesota State |
| DIII Honda Athlete of the Year | Kaley McIntyre | Swimming | NYU |

== See also ==
- Honda-Broderick Cup
- National Collegiate Athletic Association#Individual awards
- Honda Sports Award (basketball)
- List of sports awards honoring women
