= Boston Storm =

Boston Storm may refer to:

- Boston Storm (UWLX), a team in the United Women's Lacrosse League in the 2016 season
- Boston Storm (inline hockey), a team in Major League Roller Hockey between 2003 and 2008
- Boston Storm (rugby league), a rugby league team in Super League America in the 1998 season
- Boston Storm (soccer), a professional soccer team in the USISL from 1993 to 1995
