= Katie Rowan Thomson =

American women's lacrosse coach and player

Current position
- Title: Head coach
- Team: Albany Great Danes women's lacrosse
- Conference: America East

Biographical details
- Born: 11 April 1987 (age 39); Delmar, New York, U.S.
- Education: Syracuse University

Playing career
- 2005–2009: Syracuse Orange
- 2016: Long Island Sound (UWLX)
- Position: Attack

Coaching career (HC unless noted)
- 2010–2011: Syracuse (Assistant)
- 2011–2012: Albany (Assistant)
- 2012–2015: Syracuse (Assistant)
- 2016–2018: Wagner
- 2018–present: Albany
- 2019: Haudenosaunee U-19
- 2020: Haudenosaunee Senior
Medal record
World Championships
| Gold medal – first place | 2009 Czech Republic |
| Gold medal – first place | 2013 Canada |

Kathryn Rowan Thomson (born April 11, 1987) is an American professional lacrosse player who currently coaches the Albany Great Danes women's lacrosse, a position she has held since June 2018. She played college lacrosse at Syracuse.

== Playing career ==
=== NCAA ===
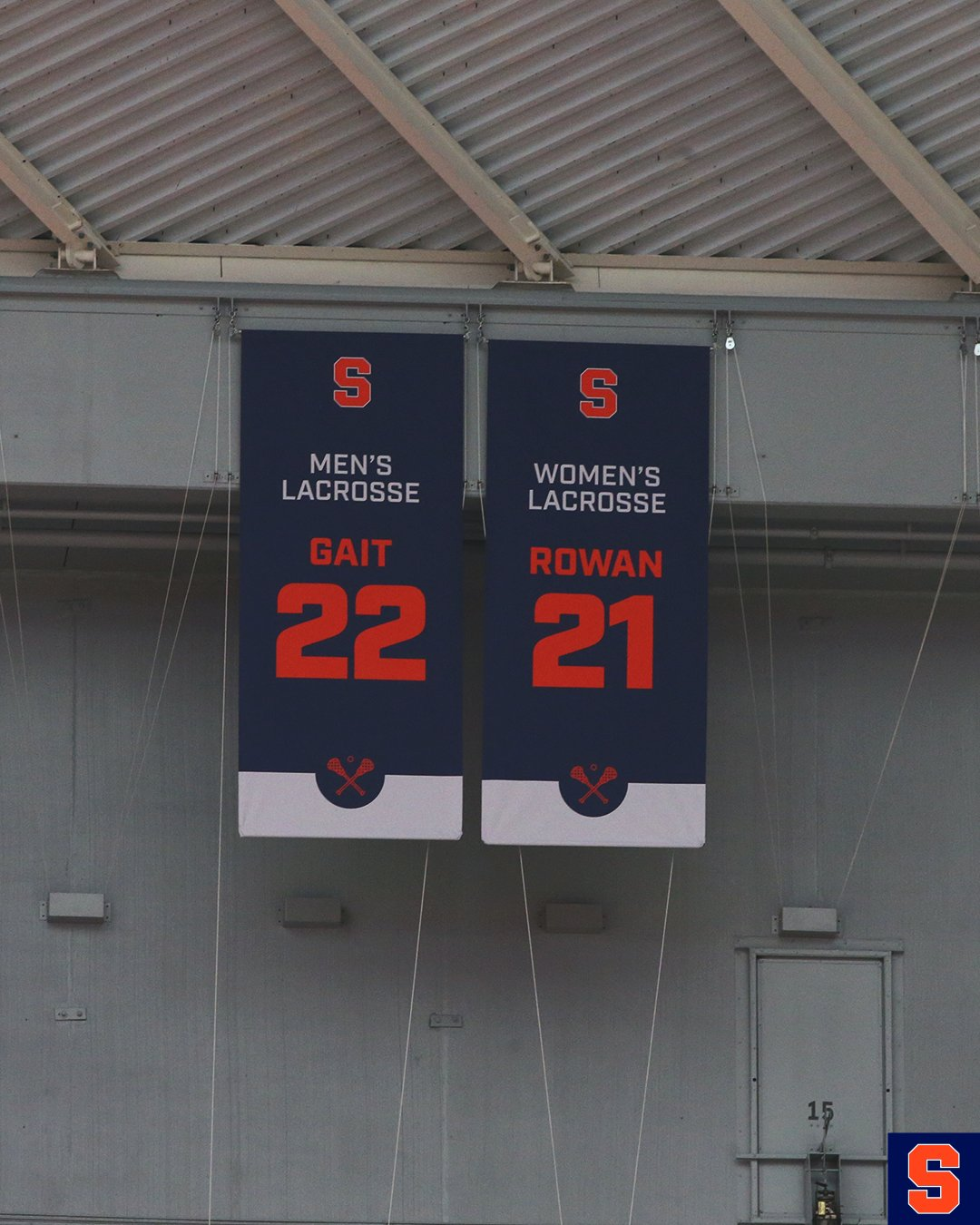
Rowan's retired #21 jersey hangs in the JMA Wireless Dome next to Gary Gait's #22 jersey.

Rowan Thomson graduated from Syracuse in 2010 as an all-time leader in points (396) and assists (164), while also scoring 232 goals. She ranked fourth on the NCAA Division I career scoring list and third on the career assists list. She was a three-time All-American and two-time Big East Attacker of the Year, Rowan Thomson's teams won the program's first-ever NCAA tournament game in 2007 and later reached its first Final Four in 2008. Rowan earned the 2009 Soladay Award, which is the highest honor bestowed upon a Syracuse University student-athlete.

In February 2022, Rowan Thomson made history as the first Syracuse Women's Lacrosse player to have her jersey (#21) retired, and the second Syracuse women's athlete to achieve this honor, following basketball legend Felisha Legette-Jack. She was recognized alongside her mentor and former coach, Gary Gait, whose #22 jersey was also retired that day. Rowan Thomson has also been inducted into the US Lacrosse Hall of Fame and the National Lacrosse Hall of Fame.

=== USA lacrosse ===
Rowan Thomson has won gold medals at the World Lacrosse Championship as a member of the U.S. Women's National Team. She holds the record for the most points scored at World Cups between the 2009 and 2013 tournaments, with a total of 69 points. She also holds the record for the most goals scored in a single game, with 8 goals. Her 35 national team assists are the most for the U.S., and in 2009, when the U.S. won gold, Rowan Thomson scored 35 points in the tournament. Thompson contributed to the U.S. team's gold medal win at the 2009 Women's Lacrosse World Cup in Prague, Czech Republic. She also helped the U.S. national team secure its second consecutive gold medal at the 2013 Women's Lacrosse World Cup in Oshawa, Ontario, where she was named player of the match in the final game after setting a program record with 8 goals and 10 points. She was the second-leading scorer for Team USA at the tournament, with 35 points. In her 14 games with the U.S. national team, Thompson scored a total of 67 points, tying her with Kelly Amonte Hiller for the most points in U.S. history.

=== UWLX ===
Rowan Thomson was selected by the Long Island Sound in the inaugural United Women's Lacrosse League draft in 2016.

== Coaching career ==
After graduation, Rowan Thomson served as an assistant coach at Syracuse and Albany. As an offensive coach with the Orange, she coached three First-Team American attackers: Alyssa Murray, Kayla Treanor and Halle Majorana.

From 2016 to 2018, Rowan Thomson was the head coach of the Wagner Seahawks women's lacrosse. During her first season at Wagner, she guided the team to win the 2016 Northeast Conference championship, which was a first for the program. She posted a 31–27 record at Wagner and led the Seahawks to two conference championships and NCAA Tournament appearances.

Rowan Thomson was named the head coach of the Albany Great Danes women's lacrosse in June 2018. In 2021, she was named America East Coach of the Year, and the Great Danes finished the season with a 11–7 overall record and 7–2 in the America East conference.

She served as the head coach of the Pride, a team in the Women's Professional Lacrosse League, for the duration of the league's existence (2018 and 2019).

In August 2019, she coached the Haudenosaunee women's national under-19 lacrosse team that played in the World Games in Peterborough, Canada. She also served as a coach for the Haudenosaunee team in the Pan-American Lacrosse Association Women's World Qualifiers, which took place in Auburndale, Florida, in November 2019. She held the position of head coach for the Haudenosaunee National Senior Team for the World Games, having been officially named to this role on May 1, 2020.

== Personal life ==
Rowan Thomson was born to Martin and Susan Rowan and grew up in Delmar, New York. She graduated from the Bethlehem High School in 2005. She graduated with bachelor's and master's degrees, in 2009 and 2010 respectively, from the School of Education and the Maxwell School of Citizenship and Public Affairs. She also has a master's degree from Wagner College.

She married UAlbany men's lacrosse coach Merrick Thomson on December 31, 2019, in Saratoga Springs, New York.
