= Michele DeJuliis =

Commissioner of United Women's Lacrosse League until December 2016

Michele DeJuliis is an American lacrosse administrator and former player. She was appointed as the commissioner of the inaugural United Women's Lacrosse League in 2015, holding the position until December 2016. On May 23, 2013, DeJuliis was elected to the US National Lacrosse Hall of Fame. As a player, she earned All-American honors at Penn State and captured a gold medal with the United States women's national lacrosse team at the 2009 Women's Lacrosse World Cup.

== Career ==
DeJuliis attended Loch Raven High School, where she played soccer, basketball, and lacrosse. A starter on the lacrosse team for all four years, she helped Loch Raven win back-to-back state titles during her first two seasons with the squad. As a junior in 1992, DeJuliis was named The Baltimore Sun All-Metro Player of the Year after recording 90 goals and 34 assists. As a senior, she was named The Baltimore Sun Baltimore City/County Player of the Year after recording 76 goals and 25 assists.

Gaining All-America honors as a member of the Penn State Nittany Lions women's lacrosse team, she would amass 142 goals and 203 career points.

Of note, she was part of the US national team program since 1994. A former member of the United States national team, DeJuliis captured a gold medal at the 2009 Federation of International Lacrosse Women's Lacrosse World Cup.

In January 2001, she founded The Ultimate Goal Lacrosse Club. DeJuliis would join the Princeton Tigers women's lacrosse program during the 2004–05 season in a role as offensive coordinator.

== Law enforcement ==
DeJuliis was a former member of the Baltimore Police Department from 1999 to 2004. During her time, she earned Meritorious Conduct Award and the Police Commissioner's Award of Excellence.

== Awards and honors ==
- 1992 The Baltimore Sun Metro Player of the Year
- 1993 The Baltimore Sun Baltimore City/County Player of the Year
- 1997 Aimee Willard Award (presented to the outstanding college player at the National Tournament)
- Three-time IWLCA All-America (1995, 1996, 1997)
- Greater Baltimore Chapter of the US Lacrosse Hall of Fame (2008)
- 2009 Beth Allen Award (presented to a member of the US Lacrosse Women's Division)
- US National Lacrosse Hall of Fame (2013)
