= Michelle Tumolo =

American lacrosse player and coach (born 1991)

Michelle Tumolo (born March 20, 1991) is an American women's lacrosse coach and former player. She has been the Head Coach of the Army Black Knights women's lacrosse team since 2021. After playing with the Syracuse Orange women's lacrosse at the collegiate level, she was named to the US national team for the 2015–16 season. In 2016, she was selected by the Philly Force as their first-ever draft pick in the inaugural United Women's Lacrosse League Draft.

== Playing career ==
Raised in the Mullica Hill section of Harrison Township, New Jersey, Tumolo began her career in the summer of 2005 before her freshman year at Clearview Regional High School, where she was a three-time captain. In her junior year, she participated in the 2008 National High School Girls' Lacrosse Tournament. Playing under the coaching of Megan Conklin, she would graduate with school records for goals (270), assists (121), ground balls (364), and draw controls (308).

=== NCAA ===
Tumolo played with the Syracuse Orange from 2010 to 2013 under head coach Gary Gait. In her debut season, Tumolo would post the highest single-season totals in points and assists for a freshman in program history. With the Orange, Tumolo played for a pair of Big East Championship teams in 2012 and 2013. In addition, she appeared with the Orange in the 2012 NCAA Championship game in 2012, complemented by a pair of NCAA Final Four competitions in 2010 and 2013. In her senior season with the Orange playing against Cornell on April 13, 2013, Tumolo tore her ACL. This injury sidelined her for the rest of her senior season.

Graduating fifth on the program's all-time scoring list with 278 points, Tumolo is just the second player in school history to record 200 points, 100 goals and 100 assists in her career. In 2012, Tumolo became the first player in program history to earn the National Attacker of the Year award. That season, she scored a career-high 95 points while leading the Orange in assists with 43, respectively.

=== USA Lacrosse ===
Though she suffered an ACL tear in 2013, Tumolo bounced back to make the US national team. Along with Orange alums Liz Hogan and Katie Rowan, Tumolo was one of two current stars with the Orange, joined by Becca Block that were named to the team in the summer of 2015.

Tumolo proudly wears the number 35 jersey. She is a key player on the attacking end. During a five-game tour in England in 2016, Tumolo scored nine goals for Team USA and had six assists. Also in 2016 during the Team USA Fall Classic, Tumolo contributed seven goals and led the team with 10 assists.

== Coaching career ==
In 2013, Tumolo was hired to serve on Amanda O’Leary's coaching staff at the University of Florida. During two seasons with Florida, Tumolo helped coach the offense. In 2014, the Gators would lead the NCAA in scoring and goals scored. Tumolo was also a mentor to Shannon Gilroy, who would become the first Gators player to log 100 points in a season.

On August 27, 2015, Tumolo returned to Syracuse as an assistant coach on Gait's staff.

Tumolo began a coaching career for the University of Oregon on July 5, 2016. Coaching alongside head coach Katrina Dowd, Tumolo assisted in coordinating the Ducks' offense.

In July 2018, Tumolo was named head coach for Wagner College's women's lacrosse team.

On June 28, 2021, Tumolo was named the Noto Family Head Coach of the Army Black Knights women's lacrosse team at the United States Military Academy. Tumolo takes over for Kristen Skiera, who was hired away by Virginia Tech earlier the same month. Tumolo led Army to its first ever NCAA Tournament appearance in 2023 as the Black Knights posted a 15-4 overall record including four wins over ranked opponents.

== Head coaching record ==
Statistics overview
| Season | Team | Overall | Conference | Standing | Postseason |
|---|---|---|---|---|---|
Wagner Seahawks (Northeast Conference) (2019–2021)
| 2019 | Wagner | 16-4 | 6-1 | 2nd | NCAA Division I First Round |
| 2020 | Wagner | 3-4 | 0-0 | | |
| 2021 | Wagner | 10–5 | 9–3 | 2nd | |
| Wagner: | | 29-13 (.690) | 16-4 (.800) | | |
Army Black Knights (Patriot League) (2022–present)
| 2022 | Army | 12-6 | 7–2 | 2nd | |
| 2023 | Army | 15-4 | 8–1 | 2nd | NCAA First Round |
| 2024 | Army | 9-8 | 7-2 | 3rd | |
| Army: | | 36–18 (.667) | 22–5 (.815) | | |
| Total: | | 65–31 (.677) | | | |
National champion Postseason invitational champion Conference regular season champion Conference regular season and conference tournament champion Division regular season champion Division regular season and conference tournament champion Conference tournament champion

== Awards and honors ==
- All-South Jersey First Team: 2008 and 2009
- South Jersey Senior All-Star Team: 2009
- All-Big East First Team selection: 2011, 2012 (unanimous) and 2013
- 2012 IWLCA Attacker of the Year
- 2012 finalist, Tewaaraton Award
- 2012 first-team All-America honors
- 2012 Big East Attack Player of the Year
- 2012 NCAA Championship All-Tournament Team.
- 2023 Patriot League Coach of the Year
