= Inky Ajanaku =

American volleyball player

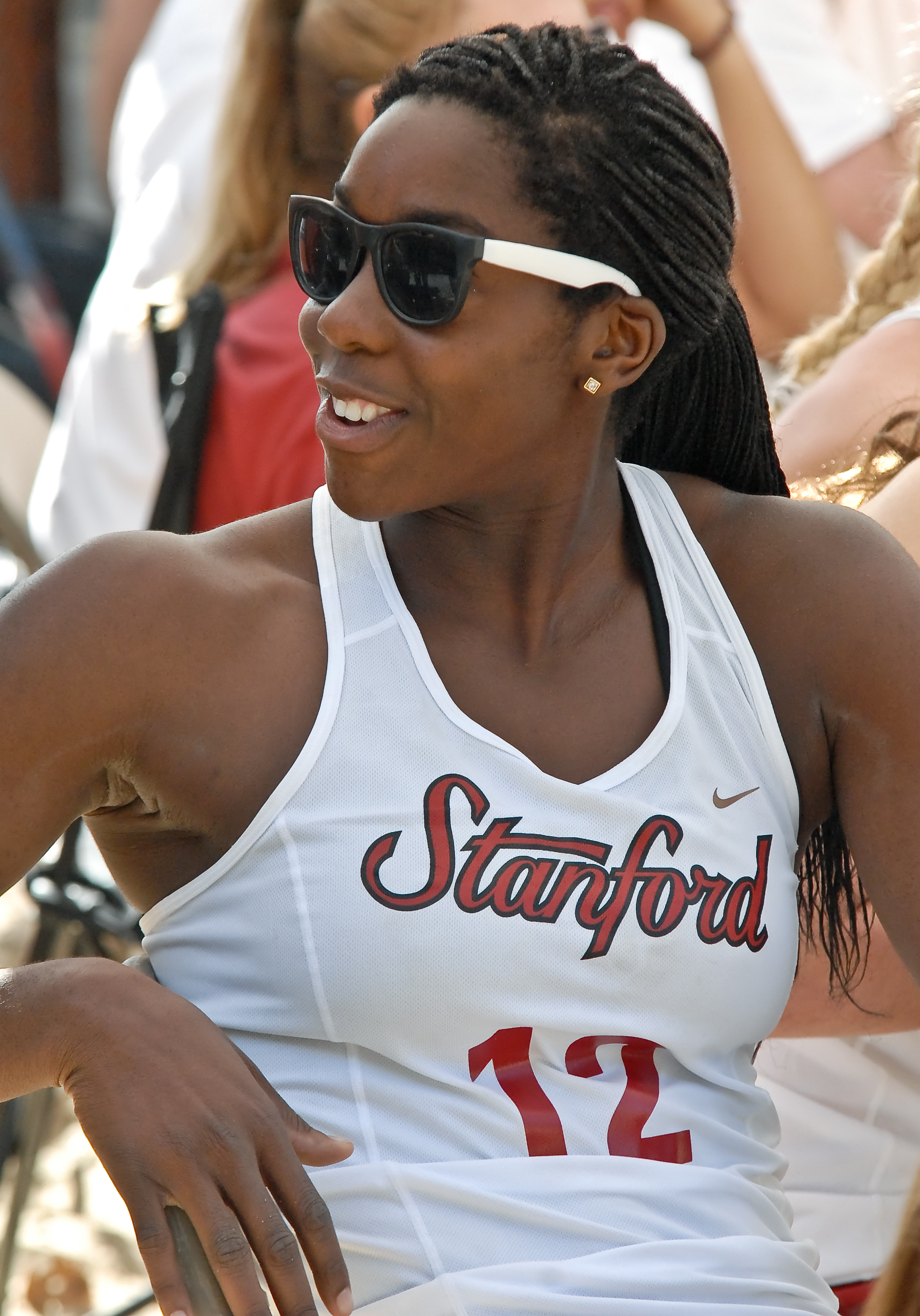
- Ajanaku in 2013

Personal information
- Full name: Oyinkansola OluSeun Ajanaku
- Nationality: United States
- Hometown: Tulsa, Oklahoma
- Height: 6 ft 3 in (191 cm)
- Education: Stanford Cardinal team.

Volleyball information
- Position: Middle blocker
Honors
2016 NCAA Division I Tournament winner
Pan American Games
Gold medal – first place	2015 Toronto	Team competition

Oyinkansola OluSeun Ajanaku, better known as Inky Ajanaku, is an American volleyball player from Tulsa, Oklahoma. Besides her collegiate career, she won a gold medal at the 2015 Pan American Games. She plays as a middle blocker.

== Career ==
Ajanaku attended Bishop Kelley High School in Tulsa, Oklahoma. In 2012 she joined the Stanford Cardinal team. She won a gold medal with the United States team at the 2015 Pan American Games in Toronto but sustained a knee injury during the competition, so she missed the 2015 collegiate season. She won the 2016 NCAA Division I Tournament with the Cardinal as a redshirt senior and was named the Most Outstanding Player. She was a member of the AVCA All-America First-Team in 2013, 2014 and 2016. She was a Honda Sports Award finalist in 2015, and went on to win the Award as the nation's best female collegiate volleyball athlete in 2017. In 2017 she was nominated for the Best Female College Athlete ESPY Award.

After her college career, Ajanaku joined Volero Zurich for the 2017–18 season but missed the Swiss Championships because of an injury. In May 2017, she announced that she would leave Volero Zurich and join Galatasaray S.K., but the contract was cancelled by Galatasaray on September 18.
