= Alyssa Murray =

American lacrosse player (born 1992)

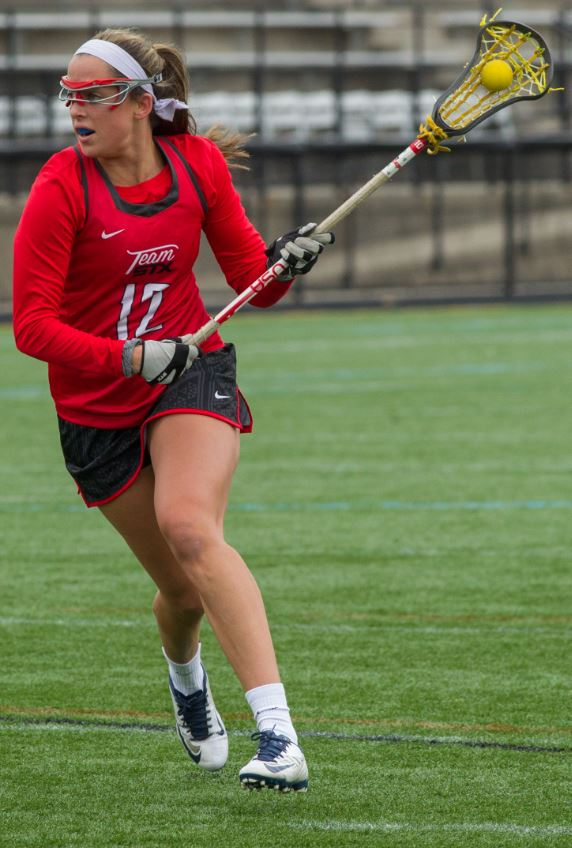

Personal information
- Nationality: United States
- Born: March 17, 1992 (age 34) West Babylon, New York, U.S.
- Height: 5 ft 9 in (175 cm)

Sport
- Coached by: Yale (Assistant) 2015–2016; Michigan (Assistant) 2015; Stony Brook (Assistant) 2014
- NCAA team: Syracuse
- UWLX team Former teams: Philadelphia Force (UWLX); Team STX, Syracuse Orange
Medal record
The World Games
Gold medal – first place	2017 Wroclaw	Lacrosse

Alyssa Murray (born March 17, 1992) is an American professional lacrosse player playing for the Philadelphia Force (UWLX). She played college lacrosse for the Syracuse Orange women's lacrosse.

== Career ==
Murray had a stand out high school career at West Babylon High School in West Babylon, New York, where she set the standing NYSPHSAA all-time record for career assists, registering 278 between 2008 and 2010. Combined with 284 goals, Alyssa finished her scholastic career with 562 career points, along the way becoming a four-time All-Suffolk County honoree and a 2009 US Lacrosse High School All-American.

At Syracuse, Murray was second on school's all-time scoring list (362 pts), third in career goals (225) and assists (136), and fourth in single season points (2014 – 110 pts). She was teammates with Kayla Treanor and Halle Majorana.

Murray was selected 7th overall in the inaugural United Women's Lacrosse League draft in 2016 by the Philadelphia Force (UWLX).

== Awards and honors ==
- 2016 UWLX All-Star Selection

== Media coverage ==
- Featured in the October 2016 issue of SELF Magazine
