= Jazmine Smith =

Jazmine Smith is the founder and CEO of Eyekonz, a United States non-profit organization which provides sporting opportunities for African American girls aged 5 to 15 in Philadelphia through participation in field hockey and lacrosse. Smith was nominated as a White House "Changemaker" for her work with Eyekonz. She would attend the United State of Women Summit from June 14 to 15, 2016 at the White House.

Raised in Radnor, Pennsylvania, Smith played both field hockey and lacrosse growing up. With regards to field hockey, Smith competed at both Radnor Middle School and Radnor High School. In high school, she played for Phyllis Kilgore., a nationally renowned field hockey coach. Afterwards, Smith gained an athletic scholarship for basketball and played club field hock for Kutztown University.

Having also worked as a coach, Her lacrosse and field hockey programs for African-American and Latino girls include clinics, the chance to participate on club teams, while working towards establishing teams on public and charter schools throughout Philadelphia. One of her players, Margret Stewart (who was once homeless) was awarded the "Strong Kid of the Game" Award by the NBA’s Philadelphia 76ers in November 2015.

== Eyekonz ==
Smith’s efforts to establish these sporting programs exists is coordinated through an organization that she founded, known as Eyekonz. Among the organizations that Eyekonz has participated with includes U.S.A. Field Hockey Association, U.S. Lacrosse Association, and the United Women's Lacrosse League UWLX, a professional women’s lacrosse league dedicated to having a positive impact in the female sporting community, highlighted by players working in the community and participating in lacrosse clinics for youth players. Smith brought Philadelphia’s Strawberry Mansion High School girls’ lacrosse team to the inaugural UWLX weekend at Lehigh University, where the team also participated against other youth teams. Her field hockey work with Eyekonz shall also be the subject of a documentary by the USA Olympic Field Hockey Association.
