= Philadelphia Force (UWLX) =

- Founded: 2016
- League: United Women's Lacrosse League
- Based in: Philadelphia, Pennsylvania
- Colors: Midnight Green, Silver, Black, White
- Head coach: Mike Bedford
- General manager: Caitlin Jackson
- Website: Philadelphia Force

The Philadelphia Force are a United Women's Lacrosse League (UWLX) professional women's field lacrosse team based in Philadelphia, Pennsylvania. They have played in the UWLX since the 2016 season. In the 2016 season, the four teams in the UWLX will play on a barnstorming format, with all four teams playing at a single venue.

== Franchise history ==
The Philadelphia Force is one of the original four teams of the United Women's Lacrosse League (MLL). UWLX was founded by Digit Murphy and Aronda Kirby in a strategic partnership with STX. On February 23, 2016, Caitlin Jackson was announced as the first general manager in franchise history. On March 17, 2016, Missy Doherty was announced as the Force's first head coach.

The first game in franchise history took place on May 28, 2016 at Goodman Stadium at Lehigh University in Bethlehem, Pennsylvania. Opposing the Boston Storm, Philadelphia lost by a 16–8 mark. The team's first-ever goal was scored by Rebecca Lynch, with Hilary Bowen logging the assist. Bridget Bianco would register 11 saves in the loss.

=== Draft history ===
The following represented the Force's inaugural draft class. Michelle Tumolo would be the first player drafted in franchise history.

Pick	Player	Position	Nationality	College
1	Michelle Tumolo	Attacker	United States	Syracuse
2	Alyssa Murray	Attacker	United States	Syracuse
3	Kara Mupo	Attacker	United States	Northwestern
4	Bridget Bianco	Goalie	United States	Northwestern
5	Becky Lynch	Attacker	United States	North Carolina
6	Casey Pepperman	Defender	United States	Maryland
7	Demmianne Cook	Midfielder	United States	Stony Brook
8	Katie Hertsch	Defender	United States	Hofstra
9	Emily Garrity	Midfielder	United States	North Carolina
10	Samantha Cermack	Midfielder	United States	Johns Hopkins

== See also ==
- Major League Lacrosse, the professional men's field lacrosse league in North America
- National Lacrosse League, the professional men's box lacrosse league in North America
- List of professional sports teams in the United States and Canada
