= Alice Mercer =

American lacrosse player

Personal information
- Nationality: USA
- Height: 5 ft 9 in (175 cm)

Sport
- Position: Defender
- Shoots: Left/Right
- NCAA UWLX team: Maryland Terrapins (2013–16); Long Island Sound (2016–present)
- Pro career: 2009–

Alice Mercer is an American women's lacrosse player.

Having played with the Maryland Terrapins at the collegiate level, she was named to the US national team for the 2015–16 season. Upon graduating from Maryland, she was signed as a free agent by the Long Island Sound of the United Women's Lacrosse League.

== Career ==
Attending Century High School (Sykesville, Maryland), Mercer captured three state championships; a Class 2A-1A title in 2009, followed by a pair of 3A-2A titles in 2010 and 2012. Competing for the Knights varsity team, Mercer gained Conference Player of the Year honors in 2012 along with a spot on the Under Armour All-America team. She would graduate with 208 career goals.

=== NCAA ===
In her sophomore season (2014), Mercer would start in all 24 games for the Terrapins, earning a spot on the ACC Championship All-Tournament Team, while gaining her first IWLCA All-America nod (third team). Of note, the Terrapins would move to the Big Ten in 2015. On March 11, 2015, Mercer would score her first goal in NCAA play, also registering an assist against Towson.

Heading into her senior season (2016), she was recognized as one of the team captains. Statistically, she ranked second on the Terrapins with 31 caused turnovers. In addition, she registered 39 ground balls and 16 draw controls, respectively. Mercer would finish the season as one of five Terrapins players (including Taylor Cummings, Nadine Hadnagy, Zoe Stukenberg and Megan Whittle) to earn spots on the IWLCA All-America teams.

=== UWLX ===
Mercer made her UWLX debut with the Long Island Sound on June 11, 2016. Competing at Richard F. Garber Field in Amherst, Massachusetts, the Sound prevailed against the Philadelphia Force by a final score of 14–8.

=== Coaching ===
In 2016 Mercer began as an assistant coach for Niagara University.

== Awards and honors ==
- 2012 Under Armour All-American (High School)
- 2013 IWLCA Second Team All-Region
- 2014 ACC Championship All-Tournament Team
- 2014 First Team All-ACC
- 2014 IWLCA Second Team All-Region
- 2014 IWLCA Third Team All-American
- 2014 NCAA All-Tournament Team
- 2015 All-Big Ten
- 2015 IWLCA Second Team All-American
- 2016 All-Big Ten
- 2016 Big Ten All-Tournament Team
- 2016 Big Ten Defensive Player of the Year
- 2016 Honda Award Finalist
- 2016 Inside Lacrosse Preseason First Team All-American
- 2016 IWLCA Defensive Player of the Year (Division I)
- 2016 Tewaaraton Award Finalist
