= Devon Wills =

American lacrosse player

Personal information
- Nationality: USA
- Born: March 28, 1984 (age 42) Colorado, U.S.
- Height: 5 ft 9 in (175 cm)

Sport
- Position: Goaltender
- Shoots: Left/Right
- NCAA team: Dartmouth Big Green
- Pro career: 2003–
Medal record
Representing United States
World Championships
Gold medal – first place	2009 Czech Republic
Gold medal – first place	2013 Canada
The World Games
Gold medal – first place	2017 Wroclaw	Lacrosse

Devon Wills (born March 28, 1984) is an American women's lacrosse player. Having played with the Dartmouth Big Green at the collegiate level, she would become the first female player to sign a contract with the New York Lizards of Major League Lacrosse.

From 2007 to 2013, Wills was a member of the United States national team. In 2016, she became the first-ever draft pick of the Long Island Sound, one of four charter franchises in the United Women's Lacrosse League.

== Playing career ==
A Denver native, Wills was a two-time All-American in high school at Colorado Academy.

=== NCAA ===
Named the Ivy League Rookie of the Year in 2003, Wills was also named to the All-Ivy League second-team notice. Wills participated in the 2003 and 2004 NCAA quarterfinals in 2003 and 2004. In 2005, Dartmouth qualified for the national semifinals. In her senior season, Wills was named team captain as the team appeared in the 2006 NCAA national championship game. During her Dartmouth career, Wills also qualified for a spot on the US national development team.

=== USA Lacrosse ===
One of Wills' first experiences with the US national team included a roster spot on the Prague Cup Touring Team in 2008. With the US national team, Wills would capture a pair of gold medals in the FIL World Cup (2009, 2013).

In the aftermath of the 2009 FIL World Cup, Wills logged a 6.69 goals against average and a 46.6 save percentage. Wills was recognized as the Player of the Match in the championship game. She would log eight saves in the 8-7 championship win over Australia. At the 2013 World Cup in Oshawa, Ontario (located east of Toronto), Wills started all seven games. Overall, she would post a goals against average of 5.58. Wills was named to the training squad that shall prepare for the 2017 edition of the FIL World Cup.

=== UWLX ===
Selected by the Long Island Sound with their first pick in the 2016 UWLX Draft, Wills would gain the start in the first game in franchise history. In addition, said game was also the first in UWLX history. Opposing the Baltimore Ride, Long Island prevailed by a 13-12 tally. Of note, Wills allowed the first goal in UWLX history to Beth Glaros, while also registering the first win in league history.

== Coaching career ==
Upon graduating from Dartmouth, Wills remained with the program serving as an assistant coach from 2007 to 2008. Serving in the capacities of both defensive coordinator and recruiting coordinator, she also helped to start the Dartmouth Winter Lacrosse Camp.

In 2010, Wills joined the University of Denver as a volunteer assistant in 2010. During the season, the Pioneers enjoyed a 13–5 record, qualifying for the Mountain Pacific Sports Federation finals. In 2011, she was appointed to a full-time assistant position on the coaching staff.

Joining the USC Trojans women's lacrosse program in 2013, Wills would become the associate head coach in 2016. Other roles that she occupied with the program included assistant coach, defensive coordinator, and recruiting coordinator. On August 1, 2018, Wills was announced as the new head coach for Harvard women's lacrosse.

== Statistics ==
- GP = Games Played
- GAA = Goals Against Average
- PCT = Percentage
- W = Wins
- L = Losses
- GB = Ground Balls

Season	Team	League	GP	GAA	Saves	Pct	W	L	GB	CT
2003	Dartmouth Big Green	NCAA	11	6.81	88	.547	9	2	31	12
2004	Dartmouth Big Green	NCAA	16	7.56	133	.530	10	6	49	9
2005	Dartmouth Big Green	NCAA	19	7.00	138	.521	16	3	49	12
2006	Dartmouth Big Green	NCAA	20	6.59	134	.502	14	6	64	18
NCAA Totals			66	6.99	493	.525	49	17	193	51

Statistics source

== Awards and honors ==
- 2003 Ivy League Rookie of the Year
- 2003 All-Ivy Second Team
- 2004-06 All-Ivy First Team
- 2004-06 IWLCA/US Lacrosse All-America second team
- 2013, 2017 FIL World Cup All-World Team
- 2006, 2009 Women's Lacrosse Award from Sportswomen of Colorado
- 2016 UWLX All-Star Selection
