= Rachel Vallarelli =

American lacrosse player

Rachel Villardi
Personal information
- Born: Hartsdale, New York, U.S.

Sport
- Position: Goaltender
- NCAA team: University of Massachusetts

Rachel Vallarelli is an American lacrosse player. In 2019, she became the first woman in history to be invited to the NLL U.S. Elite Combine.

== Career ==
From 2012 to 2015, she attended the University of Massachusetts. In her final season at the university, she was named Atlantic 10 Defensive Player of the Year, and she finished her career with 8th-best goals against average in NCAA history.

In 2019, she was invited to try-out for the New York Riptide, but failed to make the cut. She was then drafted by the Whitby Steelhawks of the Canadian Arena Lacrosse League.

== Personal life ==
Vallarelli has a degree in sports management.
