= Taylor Cummings =

American lacrosse player (born 1994)

Personal information
- Born: June 2, 1994 (age 32) United States

Sport
- Position: Midfielder (field), Forward (box)
- NCAA team: University of Maryland's women's lacrosse

Taylor Cummings (born June 2, 1994) is a lacrosse midfielder, formerly for the University of Maryland's women's lacrosse team. Winning the Tewaaraton Trophy in 2014, 2015, and 2016, Cummings was once regarded as the best female collegiate lacrosse player in the country. She helped the Maryland Terrapins win two National Championships in 2014 and in 2015.

In 2015, Cummings was nominated for the Best Female College Athlete ESPY Award. She is also a 2015–2016 U.S. National team member. Cummings finished her collegiate lacrosse career for Maryland in the spring of 2016 as a senior captain. While Cummings pushed through the season with an undefeated record, the Maryland Terrapins fell short on May 29, 2016 in the NCAA National Championship to the Carolina Tar Heels. While at Maryland, Cummings was the first ever three-time recipient of the Honda Sports Award for women's lacrosse, awarded to the top player in a Division I school.

== Early years ==
Cummings grew up in Ellicott City, Maryland. She was born to Carol Cummings and Michael Cummings, who played soccer at the College of William and Mary. She has a younger sister, Kelsey Cummings, who also played on the women's lacrosse team for the University of Maryland.

Cummings attended the McDonogh School, a private, K-12 prep school, in Owings Mills, Maryland. While there, she helped the school's lacrosse team win four state championships. In her sophomore, junior and senior years the lacrosse team went undefeated. Although lacrosse was her focus, Cummings was a three-sport athlete, winning two state championships with soccer and one state championship with basketball. At McDonogh she was an honor roll student and made the dean's list.

In high school, Cummings won the following awards:

- ESPN High School First Team – 2011
- Inside Lacrosse Top Rising Senior – 2011
- Baltimore Sun Athlete of the Year and Lacrosse Player of the Year – 2011, 2012
- Lacrosse Magazine National and Mid-Atlantic Player of the Year – 2011, 2012
- Under Armour All-American and MVP – 2012
- Inside Lacrosse No. 1 Rising Freshman

Cummings studied finance in the Robert H. Smith School of Business at the University of Maryland in College Park, Maryland.

== College career ==
In the fall of her senior year at McDonogh, Cummings committed to play for the University of Maryland's women's lacrosse team as the nation's top recruit. She plays the position of midfield.

=== Freshman year (2013) ===
In Cummings's freshman year she scored 43 goals and had 14 assists. She posted a team-high of 94 draw controls, registered 28 ground balls and caused 21 turnovers.

=== Sophomore year (2014) ===
Cummings won the Tewaaraton Trophy her sophomore year, becoming the youngest woman to win the award and earn the distinction as the most outstanding female collegiate lacrosse player. She started in all 24 games, posted a team-high of 128 draw controls and scored 63 goals. Cummings tied for second on the team in assists (24) and points (87). She also had 37 ground balls and 30 caused turnovers. Cummings scored a hat trick (3 goals) and had 1 assist in Maryland's National Championship win against Syracuse University on May 25, 2014.

=== Junior year (2015) ===
Cummings won the Tewaaraton Trophy for the second time in 2015. She led the nation with 100 points, ranked fifth in the nation with 6.50 draw controls per game, ranked eighth in the nation with 63 goals, and ranked fifth in the nation with 4.55 points per game. Cummings also led her team in assists (37), points (100), ground balls (41), draw controls (143), caused turnovers (36) and started in all 22 games. She scored a hat trick (3 goals), had 2 assists, and posted 7 draw controls in Maryland's National Championship win against the University of North Carolina on May 24, 2015.

=== Senior year (2016) ===
Cummings won the Tewaaraton Trophy for the third time in 2016, making her the first and, to date, only three-time Tewaaraton Award winner for either men or women. Cummings led her team in draw controls (144), groundballs (62) and caused turnovers (52) while starting all 23 games for the Terrapins. She was second on her team in goals (60), assists (19) and points (79).

== Professional ==
In the aftermath of graduating from Maryland, Cummings joined the Baltimore Ride during the 2016 UWLX season. She made her debut on June 10, 2016 as the Ride lost to the Boston Storm by a 17–16 margin at Richard F. Garber Field in Amherst, Massachusetts After the UWLX she was a member of New York Fight of Women's Professional Lacrosse League. Cummings also played in the inaugural season of Athletes Unlimited lacrosse and took home the title of inaugural Athletes Unlimited lacrosse champion, earning 1,943 points.

== Team USA ==
As a member of the U.S. team in the 2022 World Lacrosse Women's World Championship Cummings helped guide her squad to an 11-8 win over Canada for a gold medal, winning Tournament MVP and being named to the All-World Team.

== Awards ==
- 2022 World Lacrosse Women's World Championship Tournament MVP
- 2016 Honda Sports Award
- 2016 Tewaaraton Award winner
- 2015 Tewaaraton Award winner
- 2015 Honda Sports Award winner
- 2014–15 Big Ten Female Athlete of the Year
- 2015–16 U.S. National Team member
- 2015 ESPY Best Female College Athlete nominee
- 2015 IWLCA First Team All-American
- 2015 IWLCA First Team All-Region
- 2015 NCAA Championship MOP
- 2015 NCAA All-Tournament Team
- 2015 Big Ten Midfielder of the Year
- 2015 All-Big Ten
- 2014–15 U.S. National Team member
- 2014 Tewaaraton Award winner
- 2014 Honda Sports Award winner
- 2014 IWLCA National Midfielder of the Year
- 2014 IWLCA First Team All-American
- 2014 IWLCA First Team All-Region
- 2014 NCAA Championship MOP
- 2014 ACC Championship All-Tournament Team
- 2014 First Team All-ACC
- 2014 ESPY Best Female College Athlete nominee
- 2013 IWLCA First Team All-American
- 2013 ACC Freshman of the Year
- 2013 All-ACC
