= Alyssa Leonard =

American women's lacrosse player

Personal information
- Nationality: USA
- Height: 5 ft 8 in (173 cm)
- Weight: 175 lb (79 kg; 12 st 7 lb)

Sport
- Shoots: Left/Right
- NCAA UWLX team: Northwestern University; Long Island Sound
- Pro career: 2009–

Alyssa Leonard is an American women's lacrosse player. Having played with the Northwestern Wildcats women's lacrosse at the collegiate level, she was named to the US national team for the 2015–16 season. In 2016, she was selected by the Long Island Sound with their second pick overall in the inaugural United Women's Lacrosse League Draft. Leonard graduated from Northwestern as the NCAA draw control record holder.

== Playing career ==
=== NCAA ===
On April 27, 2014, Leonard and the Northwestern lacrosse team hosted the University of Southern California Lady Trojans in a contest at historic Wrigley Field. With an attendance of 5,145 fans, the Wildcats prevailed by a final tally of 12–7. Leonard logged a hat trick while teammate Kara Mupo led the team with four goals scored.

=== UWLX ===
Competing in the first-ever game in the history of UWLX, at Goodman Stadium on the campus of Lehigh University, Leonard scored the game-winning goal as the Long Island Sound prevailed against Baltimore. In the Sound's second game, Leonard and Shannon Gilroy would each record hat tricks in a 14–8 final against Philadelphia.

== Coaching career ==
After graduating from Northwestern, Leonard was hired as the offensive coordinator and assistant coach for the USC Lady Trojans. Working on the staff of head coach Lindsey Munday, she replaced fellow Wildcats alum Hilary Bowen.

== Awards and honors ==
- American Lacrosse Conference Rookie of the Year
- 2013 Second-team All-ALC honoree
- 2013 ALC All-Tournament Team selection
- 2014 First-team All-ALC honoree
- 2014 ALC All-Tournament Team selection
- 2014 Second-team IWLCA All-American
- 2014 First-team IWLCA All-West Region honoree
- 2014 NCAA All-Tournament Team
- 2014 Big Ten Athlete of the Year Nominee
- 2014 Female Athlete of the Year Northwestern University
- 2016 UWLX All-Star Selection
