= Liz Hogan =

American women's lacrosse player (born 1989)

Liz Hogan (born July 1989) is an American women's lacrosse player. Having played with the Syracuse Orange at the collegiate level, she was named to the US national team for the 2015-16 season. In 2016, she was selected by the Boston Storm as their first-ever selection in the inaugural United Women's Lacrosse League Draft.

== Playing career ==
In high school, Hogan recorded 265 saves and posted a .650 save percentage in her senior year. An All-Greater Rochester selection in 2007, she also earned Honorable Mention All-American nods from US Lacrosse in 2006 and 2007.

=== NCAA ===
With the Syracuse Orange women's lacrosse, Hogan was a four-year starter for head coach Gary Gait. She was the first goalkeeper in program history to be named to the IWLCA All-America First Team. From 2010 – 2011, Hogan served as team captain.

During Hogan's senior year, she was a unanimous choice to the Preseason All-Big East team. Of note, she led the Big East conference in save percentage (.489). She also made 11 saves in a contest against Notre Dame, which also included the 600th of her career. Hogan graduated as the program's all-time leader in saves (660) and ground balls (181).

=== USA National team ===
In 2012, Hogan was named to the World Cup Training Team, although she was not among the final selections for the 2013 World Cup.

Along with Orange alum Katie Rowan and current stars Becca Block and Michelle Tumolo, Hogan they were named to the US national team in the summer of 2015.

=== UWLX ===
Prior to being drafted 4th place overall in the inaugural United Women's Lacrosse League draft in 2016, Hogan enjoyed an endorsement with STX.

== Coaching career ==
During her time as a player with the Syracuse Orange, Hogan also served as the head goalkeeping coach for the Relentless Hustle Lacrosse Club in Rochester, New York. From 2012 to 2013, Hogan served on the coaching staff at Colgate University. She would join Virginia Tech's coaching staff in 2014, and moved on to the Stanford Cardinal in 2015. With the Cardinal, Hogan coordinated the team's defense and worked as a goalie coach. During Hogan's first season, the Cardinal won the Mountain Pacific Sports Federation regular-season and tournament titles and advanced to the NCAA tournament.

== Awards and honors ==
- 2010 IWLCA Goalkeeper of the Year
- 2010 IWLCA All-American
- All-Big East First Team Member
- 2016 UWLX All-Star Selection
