= Long Island Sound (UWLX) =

Professional women's field lacrosse team

- Founded: 2016
- League: United Women's Lacrosse League
- Based in: Long Island, NY
- Colors: Navy blue, red, white
- Head coach: Regy Thorpe
- General manager: Carol Rainson-Rose assisted by Tracy Wiener
- Website: Long Island Sound

The Long Island Sound are a United Women's Lacrosse League (UWLX) professional women's field lacrosse team based in Long Island, New York. They have played in the UWLX since the 2016 season. In the 2016 season, the four teams in the UWLX played in a barnstorming format, with all four teams playing at a single venue.

== Franchise history ==
The Long Island Sound is one of the original four teams of the United Women's Lacrosse League (MLL). UWLX was founded by Digit Murphy and Aronda Kirby in a strategic partnership with STX. On February 23, 2016, Danielle Gallagher was announced as the first general manager in franchise history. On March 17, 2016, Shannon Smith was announced as the Sound's first head coach.

The first game in franchise history took place on May 28, 2016 at Goodman Stadium at Lehigh University in Bethlehem, Pennsylvania. Opposing the Baltimore Ride, Long Island prevailed by a 13-12 tally. The team's first-ever goal was scored by McKinley Curro, who would also score the league's first-ever two-point goal. Devon Wills served as the starting goaltender, allowing the first goal in UWLX history to Baltimore Ride but also registered the first win in league history.

=== Draft history ===
The following represented the Sound’s inaugural draft class. Devon Wills would be the first player drafted in franchise history.

Pick	Player	Position	Nationality	College
1	Devon Wills	Goalie	United States	Dartmouth
2	Alyssa Leonard	Attacker	United States	Northwestern
3	Shannon Gilroy	Midfielder	United States	Florida
4	Becca Block	Defender	United States	Syracuse
5	Megan Douty	Defender	United States	Maryland
6	Sloane Serpe	Defender	United States	North Carolina
7	Nora Barry	Midfielder	United States	Florida
8	Katrina Dowd	Attacker	United States	Northwestern
9	Katie Rowan	Attacker	United States	Syracuse
10	Kelly McPartland	Midfielder	United States	Maryland

== See also ==
- Women's Professional Lacrosse League
- Major League Lacrosse, the professional men's field lacrosse league in North America
- National Lacrosse League, the professional men's box lacrosse league in North America
- List of professional sports teams in the United States and Canada
