= Katie Schwarzmann =

American lacrosse player

Personal information
- Nationality: USA
- Born: September 15, 1991 (age 34) Maryland, U.S.
- Height: 5 ft 4 in (163 cm)

Sport
- Position: Attack
- Shoots: Left/right
- NCAA team: Maryland Terrapins
- Pro career: 2009–
Medal record
World Championships
Gold medal – first place	2013 Canada
The World Games
Gold medal – first place	2017 Wroclaw	Lacrosse

Katie Schwarzmann (born September 15, 1991) is an American women's lacrosse player. Having played with the Maryland Terrapins at the collegiate level, she was a two-time winner of the Tewaaraton Trophy. She was also a member of the US national team from 2010 to 2013. In 2016, she was selected first overall in the inaugural United Women's Lacrosse League draft, selected by the Baltimore Ride.

== Playing career ==
=== NCAA ===
As a freshman, Schwarzmann would score three goals in the Terrapins victory over Northwestern in the 2010 NCAA championship game. Her 65 goals would lead the team during her sophomore season. In the aftermath of her junior season, Schwarzmann's 72 goals ranked second in the NCAA, while leading all competitors in the ACC conference. With the Terrapins going undefeated in her senior season, Schwarzmann would open the campaign with a hat trick against Richmond. On February 17, she would score a career high seven goals in a 19–11 win against Syracuse. Following her senior year, she would capture multiple honors including: ACC Offensive Player of the Year, IWLCA First Team All-American, Synapse Sport Midfielder of the Year and ACC Championship Most Valuable Player. Schwarzmann graduated third all-time in Terrapins history with 228 goals and 304 points (304). As a side note, she became only the third player to have won the Tewaarton Award twice. The others were Kristen Kjellman (2006–07) and Hannah Nielsen (2008–09).

=== USA Lacrosse ===
In 2013, she was a member of the United States roster that captured the gold medal at the 2013 FIL World Cup held east of Toronto in Oshawa, Ontario. The youngest member of the team, she would register 10 goals, complemented by four assists in a total of seven tournament games.

=== UWLX ===
The first-ever draft pick of the Baltimore Ride, she was also the first player ever selected in the history of the UWLX Draft.

== Coaching career ==
In July 2014, Schwarzmann was hired in a coaching position with Mount St. Mary's. Her younger sister, Katie, also joined her on the coaching staff.

== Statistics ==
- GP = Games Played
- G = Goals
- A = Assists
- PTS = Points
- GB = Ground Balls
- DC = Draw Controls

Season	Team	League	GP	G	A	PTS	GB	DC	CT
2010	Maryland Terrapins	NCAA	23	33	11	44	38	29	15
2011	Maryland Terrapins	NCAA	23	65	16	81	38	45	22
2012	Maryland Terrapins	NCAA	23	72	22	94	31	52	17
2013	Maryland Terrapins	NCAA	23	58	27	85	39	39	19
NCAA Totals			92	228	76	304	146	165	73

Statistics source

== Awards and honors ==
=== NCAA ===
- 2010 ACC Rookie of the Year
- 2010-13 All-ACC First Team
- 2011-13 All-ACC Tournament Team
- 2012-13 ACC Offensive Player of the Year
- 2012-13 ACC Championship Most Valuable Player
- 2011 Honda Sports Award finalist
- 2010 IWLCA All-America third team
- 2011-13 IWLCA All-America first team
- 2011-13 IWLCA National Midfielder of the Year
- 2010 NCAA Rookie of the Year
- 2011 Tewaaraton Award finalist
- 2012, 2013 Tewaaraton Award

== Personal ==
Her two sisters, Ashley and Lauren played lacrosse at Johns Hopkins.
