= Kayla Treanor =

American lacrosse coach and player (born 1993)

Current position
- Title: Head coach
- Team: Penn State Nittany Lions women's lacrosse
- Conference: Big Ten

Biographical details
- Born: November 20, 1993 (age 32); Niskayuna, New York, U.S.
- Education: Syracuse University

Playing career
- 2013-2016: Syracuse Orange
- 2016: Boston Storm (UWLX)
- 2018: New York Fight (WPLL)
- Position: Attack/Midfield

Coaching career (HC unless noted)
- 2016-2017: Harvard (Assistant)
- 2018-2021: Boston College (Assistant)
- 2022-2025: Syracuse

Kayla Treanor (born November 20, 1993) is an American women's lacrosse coach for the Penn State Nittany Lions women's lacrosse team. Prior to this position, she was the head coach at Syracuse, and an assistant coach for Harvard and Boston College.

Having played with the Syracuse Orange at the collegiate level, she was named to the US national team 2013 onwards. Upon graduating from Syracuse, she was signed as a free agent by the Boston Storm of the United Women's Lacrosse League. She also played for the New York Fight in the Women's Professional Lacrosse League. In 2016, Treanor signed a deal to become the face of Nike Women's Lacrosse.

== Playing career ==
At Niskayuna High School, Treanor was a top goal scorer for the school and three-time US Lacrosse All-American. She was on three Section II championship teams while playing alongside her older sister Alyssa Treanor. Treanor was recruited by multiple programs and chose Syracuse over North Carolina.

=== NCAA ===
Treanor is one of the most decorated women's lacrosse players in college lacrosse history. Recognized as a first-team All-America in women's lacrosse for four consecutive seasons, Treanor became only the fifth athlete in the history of Syracuse University to gain four straight All-America nods in her respective varsity sport. The other athletes include wrestler Gene Mills, swimmers Liz Vilbert and Miroslav Vucetic and men's lacrosse player Mike Powell.

In Treanor's sophomore season (2014), she would set the program record for most goals in a season with 79, while finishing the season with 117 points, the second-highest single season total. Among her season highlights, she would score a career-high seven goals against the No. 1 ranked North Carolina Tar Heels. That season, Syracuse would qualify for the NCAA national championship game against Maryland. As a junior, she would become only the fifth Syracuse player to reach 200 career goals.

On April 23, 2016, Treanor registered five points in a 13-10 home win versus the Louisville Cardinals. With 7:30 remaining in the contest, Treanor's 251st career goal surpassed Christina Dove as the all-time leading scorer in Syracuse history, placing her 11th all-time in NCAA history. As a side note, the contest was held on senior day for the graduating Orange players.

Treanor would finish the season leading all Syracuse players with 50 goals and 90 points, helping the program qualify for its fifth consecutive NCAA Final Four appearance. In addition, she would set the NCAA single season record for most draw controls with 217. Of note, she would graduate with 260 career goals, finishing sixth all-time in NCAA history. In addition, she ranks fourth all-time with 393 points.

=== USA lacrosse ===
Treanor made her USA lacrosse debut with the Under-19 national team winning the gold in 2012 and joined the USA Senior Team in 2013. She later led the USA National Lacrosse to Gold in 2017.

=== UWLX ===
Making her debut with the Boston Storm on June 10, 2016, Treanor scored five goals, including the game-winning tally in a 17-16 final against the Baltimore Ride. Treanor would lead the Storm to the inaugural UWLX finals, losing in a hard-fought match to the Long Island Sound.

== Coaching career ==
After graduation, Treanor was hired at Harvard by former Syracuse Orange head coach Lisa Miller as an assistant coach.

She moved to Boston College in 2017, where she stayed until 2021. During her four years BC advanced to the championship game three times (2020 season was cancelled due to COVID-19), in one which they defeated the Orange for the title. She also mentored two Tewaaraton Award winners.

On 23 June 2021, Treanor was named the head coach of the Syracuse Orange women's lacrosse. She is the third coach in the program history, replacing Gary Gait, who was named the Syracuse Orange men's lacrosse head coach in prior month. At 27, she is also the youngest coach in the Atlantic Coast Conference.

On 21 May 2025, Treanor was named the head coach of the Penn State Nittany Lions women's lacrosse team.

== Awards and honors ==
- 2013-16, First Team All-America
- 2013-16, All-Northeast Region First Team
- 2013 All-Big East First Team
- 2014-15, ACC All-Tournament Team selection
- 2014-15, NCAA All-Tournament Team Selection
- 2014-16, Finalist Tewaaraton Award
- 2014-16 IWLCA Attacker of the Year
- 2014 Cuse Award for Female Performance of the Year in Syracuse Athletics
- 2015, All-ACC First Team
- 2015, Finalist Honda Award
- 2015, ACC Offensive Player of the Year
- 2015, ACC Tournament MVP
- 2016 UWLX All-Star Selection

== Personal life ==
Treanor was born to Mark and Janice Treanor in Niskayuna, New York. Her father coached the Niskayuna High School boys' basketball team for more than 20 years. Her older sister Alyssa played lacrosse at Siena College and later became head coach at Union College.
