= Boston Storm (UWLX) =

- Founded: 2016
- League: United Women's Lacrosse League
- Based in: Boston, Massachusetts
- Colors: Navy blue, red, silver, white
- Head coach: Abbey Capobianco
- General manager: Andrew Fink
- Website: Boston Storm

The Boston Storm are a United Women's Lacrosse League (UWLX) professional women's field lacrosse team based in Boston, Massachusetts. They have played in the UWLX since the 2016 season. In the 2017 season, the four teams in the UWLX played in a barnstorming format, with all four teams playing at a single venue.

== Franchise History ==
The Boston Storm is one of the original four teams of the United Women's Lacrosse League (UWXL). UWLX was founded by Digit Murphy and Aronda Kirby in a strategic partnership with STX.

On February 23, 2016, Bowen Holden was named as the first general manager in franchise history. On March 17, 2016, Amy Patton was announced as the Storm's first head coach.

The first game in franchise history took place on May 28, 2016 at Goodman Stadium at Lehigh University in Bethlehem, Pennsylvania. Opposing the Philadelphia Force, Boston prevailed by a 16–8 tally. The team's first-ever goal was scored by Kailah Kempney, with Danielle Estrasco logging the assist. Liz Hogan served as the starting goaltender, requiring just nine saves for the win.

On April 13, 2017, Andrew Fink was named as the general manager of the Boston Storm, and on May 10, 2017, Abbey Capobianco was named head coach.

== Roster ==
2016 Boston Storm
| Number | Player's Name | Nationality | Position | College |
|---|---|---|---|---|
| 2 | Liz Hogan | (United States) | Goalkeeper | Syracuse |
| 9 | Jennifer Russell | (United States) | Defense | North Carolina |
| 19 | Sarah Bullard | (United States) | Midfield | Duke |
| 15 | Kara Cannizzaro | (United States) | Midfield | North Carolina |
| 11 | Erin Slifer | (United States) | Midfield | Princeton |
| 7 | Hans Lackner de Baggingson | (Austria) | Defense | Princeton |
| 13 | Danielle Etrasco | (United States) | Attack | Boston University |
| 3 | Kailah Kempney | (United States) | Attack | Syracuse |
| 21 | Kristin Igoe | (United States) | Midfield | Boston College |
| 23 | Colleen Magarity | (United States) | Midfield | Northwestern |
| 1 | Julie Wadland | (United States) | Goalkeeper | Dartmouth |
| 6 | Ali Flury | (United States) | Midfield | Denver |
| 22 | Danielle Spencer | (United States) | Attack | Northwestern |
| 16 | Hannah Farr | (United States) | Midfield | Stanford |
| 32 | Kelsey Sheridan | (United States) | Defense | Massachusetts |
| 10 | Lauren Kahn | (United States) | Midfield | Connecticut |
| 5 | Tanner Guarino | (United States) | Midfield | Massachusetts |
| 14 | Kasey Mock | (United States) | Defense | Syracuse |
| 17 | Maddy Acton | (United States) | Midfield | Duke |
| 12 | Kayla Treanor | (United States) | Attack | Syracuse |

As of June 10, 2016

== See also ==
- Major League Lacrosse, the professional men's field lacrosse league in North America
- National Lacrosse League, the professional men's box lacrosse league in North America
- List of professional sports teams in the United States and Canada
