= United Women's Lacrosse League =

Defunct American women's lacrosse league (2015–2018)

- Sport: lacrosse
- Founded: 2015
- First season: 2016
- Folded: c. 2018
- Replaced by: Women's Professional Lacrosse League
- Owner: United Women's Sports
- Commissioner: Kristan Ash (2016–2018); Michele DeJuliis (2015–2016)
- No. of teams: 4
- Last champion: Philadelphia Force
- Most titles: Long Island Sound (2 titles)
- Sponsors: STX; Nike
- Website: unitedwomenslacrosse.com

The United Women’s Lacrosse League (UWLX) was a women's lacrosse league in the United States. It was co-founded in Boston, Massachusetts, by Digit Murphy and Aronda Kirby of the Play It Forward Sports Foundation, under the ownership of United Women's Sports LLC in a strategic partnership with STX. Penn State women's lacrosse alum and former United States national team player Michele DeJuliis was appointed as the league’s first commissioner. DeJuliis left after the 2016 season to found the Women's Professional Lacrosse League (WPLL); Kristan Ash served as the second and final league commissioner.

The league comprised four teams: the Baltimore Ride, Boston Storm, Long Island Sound and Philadelphia Force. Long Island won the first two championships and Philadelphia won the third and final championship.

== History ==
UWLX was the first opportunity in the form of a nationally competitive league afforded to women looking to continue playing lacrosse after their collegiate playing days conclude. Among the league's efforts, its inaugural season has allowed for over 100 opportunities for women in post-collegiate sport play in lacrosse.

“Our Play It Forward platform was started to grow opportunities for women in professional sports,” and the inaugural season features games that will be played at or in close proximity to major lacrosse tournaments in the Northeast, allowing the league to connect with and inspire younger players.

During the month of March 2016, the league unveiled the club names and logos, while also announcing the hiring of head coaches. The first four head coaches in league history include Jen Adams (Baltimore), Amy Patton (Boston), Missy Doherty (Philadelphia), and Shannon Smith (Long Island).

In late November 2016, it was announced that UWLX engaged in a partnership with Gillette Stadium which would see the league serve as a promotional partner of the 2017 NCAA Division I Women’s Lacrosse Championship. The event was held on Memorial Day Weekend 2017.

== Structure ==
League play started on May 28, 2016 and a draft took place on April 13 to fill the four team rosters. In the inaugural draft, Maryland Terrapins alumnus and former US national team player Katie Schwarzmann would be the first player ever selected, taken by the Baltimore Ride with the top pick. Other players selected in the first round of the inaugural draft were also current or former members of the US national team. Said players included Liz Hogan (Boston), Michelle Tumolo (Philly), and Devon Wills (Long Island). The inaugural regular season champions were the Long Island Sound, while Dana Dobbie captured the scoring title.

The four teams in the UWLX do not have their own home venues. Instead, all teams travel to large youth lacrosse tournaments to participate in regular season play. During the inaugural season, it was announced that the construction of a new sports complex in Attleboro, Massachusetts, known as the New England Sports Village, would serve as the eventual headquarters for UWLX.

The league also believes in having a positive impact in the female sporting community. Of note, players in UWLX conduct lacrosse clinics for young players. In addition, the league has partnered with Jazmine Smith, the founder and CEO of Eyekonz, which provides sporting opportunities for African American girls in Philadelphia through participation in field hockey and lacrosse. Smith brought the Strawberry Mansion High School girls’ lacrosse team to the inaugural UWLX weekend at Lehigh University.

== Teams ==
Locations of teams for the 2018 UWLX season.

Club	Metro area	Coach
Baltimore Ride	Baltimore	Jen Adams
Boston Storm	Boston	Abbey Capobianco
Long Island Sound	New York	Shannon Smith
Philadelphia Force	Philadelphia	Mike Bedford

== General Managers ==
General Manager	Term
Michele DeJuliis	2015–2016
Gary Gait	2017, Interim
Kristan Ash	2017

== See also ==
- Major League Lacrosse, the professional men's field lacrosse league in North America
- National Lacrosse League, the professional men's box lacrosse league in North America
- Women's Professional Lacrosse League, a professional women's field lacrosse league in North America
- List of professional sports teams in the United States and Canada
- Women's sports
