= 2027 World Lacrosse Sixes Championships =

International lacrosse competition

Tournament details
- Host country: United States
- Venue: 1 (in 1 host city)
- Dates: October 4–10, 2027
- Teams: M: 16 / W: 16

The 2027 World Lacrosse Sixes Championships is a scheduled international lacrosse sixes tournament for men's and women's national teams to be held from October 4 to 10, 2027 in Colorado Springs, United States.

The tournament is part of the qualification process for the 2028 Summer Olympics. The top four teams per gender will qualify for the Olympics. The United States, the host of the 2028 games, will qualify for the Olympics once it teams participates into the World Championships. Furthermore, six teams in each division will participate in a final Olympic qualifying tournament to determine the final Olympic berths.

== Participating nations ==
=== Qualification ===
==== Men's ====
Qualification	Hosts	Date(s)	Spot(s)	Qualifier(s)
2026 African Sixes Lacrosse Championships	(South Africa) Johannesburg	December 2–5	1	TBD
2026 Asia-Pacific Sixes Lacrosse Championships	(Australia) Sunshine Coast	October 5–10	5	Australia; Japan; Philippines; China; Chinese Taipei
2026 European Sixes Lacrosse Championships	(Spain) Salou	November 10–18	5	Great Britain; Ireland; Italy; Germany; Israel
2026 Pan-American Sixes Lacrosse Championships	(Canada) Oshawa	September 29–October 4	5	United States; Canada; Haudenosaunee; Puerto Rico; Brazil

==== Women's ====
Qualification	Hosts	Date(s)	Spot(s)	Qualifier(s)
2026 African Sixes Lacrosse Championships	(South Africa) Johannesburg	December 2–5	1	TBD
2026 Asia-Pacific Sixes Lacrosse Championships	(Australia) Sunshine Coast	October 5–10	5	Japan; Australia; South Korea; Philippines; New Zealand
2026 European Sixes Lacrosse Championships	(Spain) Salou	November 2–9	5	Israel; Great Britain; Czech Republic; Germany; Italy
2026 Pan-American Sixes Lacrosse Championships	(Canada) Oshawa	September 29–October 4	5	United States; Canada; Puerto Rico; Haudenosaunee; Argentina

== Venue ==
Games will be held at the Weidner Field in Colorado Springs. The stadium can hold two lacrosse sixes matches simultaneously.

Colorado Springs	2027 World Lacrosse Sixes Championships (the United States)
Weidner Field	2027 World Lacrosse Sixes Championships (the United States)
Capacity: 8,000	2027 World Lacrosse Sixes Championships (the United States)
