= 2026 Asia-Pacific Sixes Lacrosse Championships =

International lacrosse competition

Tournament details
- Host country: Australia
- Venues: 3 (in 1 host city)
- Dates: 5–10 October 2026
- Teams: M: 11; W: 10

Final positions
- Champions: M: Australia; W: Japan
- Runners-up: M: Japan; W: Australia
- Third place: M: Philippines; W: South Korea
- Fourth place: M: China; W: Philippines

The 2026 Asia-Pacific Sixes Lacrosse Championships was a men's and women's tournament for lacrosse sixes teams held from 5 to 10 October 2026 in Sunshine Coast, Australia. The event was hosted by Lacrosse Australia for the Asia Pacific Lacrosse Union.

The top five teams in both the men's and women's tournament qualified for the 2027 World Lacrosse Sixes Championships which in turn will be used to qualify teams for the 2028 Summer Olympics in Los Angeles.

== Participating teams ==
Men's	Women's
Australia (hosts); China; Chinese Taipei; Hong Kong; India; Japan; New Zealand; Philippines; Saudi Arabia; Singapore; South Korea	Australia (hosts); China; Chinese Taipei; Hong Kong; India; Japan; New Zealand; Philippines; Singapore; South Korea

== Venues ==
Games were played at the Kawana Sports Precinct.

Sunshine Coast	2026 Asia-Pacific Sixes Lacrosse Championships (Queensland)
Sunshine Coast Stadium and Kawana Sports Precinct Fields 2 and 3	2026 Asia-Pacific Sixes Lacrosse Championships (Queensland)

== Results ==
=== Men's ===
==== Preliminary round ====
===== Group A =====
Pos	Team	Pld	W	L	GF	GA	GD	Qualification
1	Australia (H)	3	3	0	68	16	+52	Semifinals
2	Chinese Taipei	3	2	1	43	37	+6	5th–8th place
3	Hong Kong	3	1	2	50	42	+8	5th–8th place
4	Saudi Arabia	3	0	3	3	69	−66	9th–11th place

Source: WL
(H) Hosts

===== Group B =====
Pos	Team	Pld	W	L	GF	GA	GD	Qualification
1	Japan	3	3	0	90	10	+80	Semifinals
2	New Zealand	3	2	1	58	33	+25	5th–8th place
3	India	3	1	2	19	62	−43	9th–11th place
4	Singapore	3	0	3	15	77	−62	9th–11th place

Source: WL

===== Group C =====
Pos	Team	Pld	W	L	GF	GA	GD	Qualification
1	China	2	2	0	28	22	+6	Semifinals
2	Philippines	2	1	1	36	22	+14	Semifinals
3	South Korea	2	0	2	15	35	−20	5th–8th place

Source: WL

==== Final round ====
===== 9th–11th placement =====
Pos	Team	Pld	W	L	GF	GA	GD
9	India	2	2	0	28	17	+11
10	Singapore	2	1	1	27	16	+11
11	Saudi Arabia	2	0	2	10	32	−22

Source: WL

8 October 2026; 15:00	India	14–9	Singapore

Game reference

9 October 2026; 11:15	Singapore	18–2	Saudi Arabia

Game reference

9 October 2026; 15:00	India	14–8	Saudi Arabia

Game reference

===== 5th–8th bracket =====
Seventh place
New Zealand	16
South Korea	15

Semifinals
New Zealand	11
Hong Kong	18
Chinese Taipei	13
South Korea	3

Fifth place
Hong Kong	18
Chinese Taipei	20

Semifinals

8 October 2026; 16:00	New Zealand	11–18	Hong Kong

Game reference

8 October 2026; 16:15	Chinese Taipei	13–3	South Korea

Game reference

Seventh place game

9 October 2026; 12:30	New Zealand	16–15	South Korea

Game reference

Fifth place game

10 October 2026; 11:30	Hong Kong	18–20	Chinese Taipei

Game reference

===== Championship bracket =====
Bronze medal game
China	9
Philippines	17

Semifinals
Australia	23
China	4
Japan	14
Philippines	10

Final
Australia	14
Japan	13

Semifinals

9 October 2026; 13:30	Australia	23–4	China

Game reference

9 October 2026; 16:00	Japan	14–10	Philippines

Game reference

Bronze medal game

10 October 2026; 14:30	China	9–17	Philippines

Game reference

Final

10 October 2026; 19:00	Australia	14–13	Japan

Game reference

==== Women's ====
===== Preliminary round =====
====== Group A ======
Pos	Team	Pld	W	L	GF	GA	GD	Qualification
1	Australia (H)	4	4	0	111	8	+103	Semifinals
2	Philippines	4	3	1	54	53	+1	Semifinals
3	New Zealand	4	2	2	55	42	+13	5th place game
4	China	4	1	3	49	49	0	7th place game
5	Singapore	4	0	4	5	122	−117	10th place game

Source: WL
(H) Hosts

====== Group B ======
Pos	Team	Pld	W	L	GF	GA	GD	Qualification
1	Japan	4	4	0	97	24	+73	Semifinals
2	South Korea	4	3	1	70	42	+28	Semifinals
3	Chinese Taipei	4	2	2	52	50	+2	5th place game
4	Hong Kong	4	1	3	37	48	−11	7th place game
5	India	4	0	4	11	103	−92	10th place game

Source: WL

==== Final round ====
===== Semifinals =====
9 October 2026; 17:30	Australia	15–4	South Korea

Game reference

9 October 2026; 19:00	Japan	23–5	Philippines

Game reference

===== Tenth place game =====
9 October 2026; 13:45	India	15–4	Singapore

Game reference

===== Seventh place game =====
9 October 2026; 16:15	China	9–7	Hong Kong

Game reference

===== Fifth place game =====
10 October 2026; 13:00	Chinese Taipei	11–13	New Zealand

Game reference

===== Bronze medal game =====
10 October 2026; 14:30	South Korea	16–11	Philippines

Game reference

===== Final =====
10 October 2026; 17:30	Australia	8–9	Japan

Game reference

== Final standings ==
=== Men ===
Rank	Team m	Qualification
1st place, gold medalist(s)	Australia	2027 World Championships
2nd place, silver medalist(s)	Japan	2027 World Championships
3rd place, bronze medalist(s)	Philippines	2027 World Championships
4	China	2027 World Championships
5	Chinese Taipei	2027 World Championships
6	Hong Kong	
7	New Zealand	
8	South Korea	
9	India	
10	Singapore	
11	Saudi Arabia	

=== Women ===
Rank	Team m	Qualification
1st place, gold medalist(s)	Japan	2027 World Championships
2nd place, silver medalist(s)	Australia	2027 World Championships
3rd place, bronze medalist(s)	South Korea	2027 World Championships
4	Philippines	2027 World Championships
5	New Zealand	2027 World Championships
6	Chinese Taipei	
7	China	
8	Hong Kong	
9	India	
10	Singapore	
