= 2026 Pan-American Sixes Lacrosse Championships – Women's tournament =

International lacrosse sixes competition

Tournament details
- Host country: Canada
- Venue: 1 (in 1 host city)
- Dates: September 29 – October 4, 2026
- Teams: 8

Final positions
- Champions: United States (1st title)
- Runners-up: Canada
- Third place: Puerto Rico
- Fourth place: Haudenosaunee

2026 Pan-American Sixes Lacrosse Championships – Women's tournament was a women's tournament for lacrosse sixes teams scheduled to be held from September 29 to October 4, 2026 in Oshawa, Canada. The event is hosted by Lacrosse Canada for the Pan-American Lacrosse Association.

The top five teams in both the men's and women's tournament qualified for the 2027 World Lacrosse Sixes Championships which in turn will be used to qualify teams for the 2028 Summer Olympics in Los Angeles.

== Participating teams ==
- Argentina
- Brazil
- Canada (hosts)
- Haudenosaunee
- Jamaica
- Mexico
- Puerto Rico
- United States

== Venues ==
Games were played at the Oshawa Civic Fields.

Oshawa
Oshawa Civic Fields
2026 Pan-American Sixes Lacrosse Championships – Women's tournament (Canada)

== Results ==
=== Preliminary round ===
==== Group A ====
Pos	Team	Pld	W	L	GF	GA	GD	Qualification
1	United States	3	3	0	105	21	+84	Final
2	Puerto Rico	3	2	1	52	52	0	3rd place game
3	Argentina	3	1	2	40	61	−21	5th place game
4	Brazil	3	0	3	16	79	−63	7th place game

Source: WL

==== Group B ====
Pos	Team	Pld	W	L	GF	GA	GD	Qualification
1	Canada (H)	3	3	0	80	13	+67	Final
2	Haudenosaunee	3	2	1	69	32	+37	3rd place game
3	Jamaica	3	1	2	22	72	−50	5th place game
4	Mexico	3	0	3	16	70	−54	7th place game

Source: WL
(H) Hosts

=== Final round ===
==== Seventh place game ====
October 4, 2026; 10:30	Mexico	15–17	Brazil

Game reference

==== Fifth place game ====
October 4, 2026; 9:00	Argentina	17–11	Jamaica

Game reference

==== Bronze medal game ====
October 4, 2026; 12:00	Haudenosaunee	9–15	Puerto Rico

Game reference

==== Final ====
October 4, 2026; 15:00	United States	15–14	Canada

Game reference

== Final standings ==
Rank	Team	Qualification
1st place, gold medalist(s)	United States	2027 World Championships
2nd place, silver medalist(s)	Canada	2027 World Championships
3rd place, bronze medalist(s)	Puerto Rico	2027 World Championships
4	Haudenosaunee	2027 World Championships
5	Argentina	2027 World Championships
6	Jamaica	
7	Brazil	
8	Mexico	
