= Ireland national lacrosse sixes team =

National lacrosse sixes team

Ireland
- WL ranking: Women (7); Men (NR)
- Association: Lacrosse Ireland
- Confederation: ELF (Europe)
- Head coach: (Republic of Ireland) Sean Bodie (Men) (United States) Maddy Buss (Women)

The Ireland national lacrosse sixes team represents Ireland internationally in lacrosse tournaments. They compete in lacrosse sixes, the form of lacrosse which will feature in the 2028 Summer Olympics, rather than the full field format. It is sanctioned by Ireland Lacrosse.

== History ==
Sixes Lacrosse was officially created in 2021 by World Lacrosse, the global governing body for lacrosse, in a bid to achieve lacrosse's participation in the Olympic Games.

Ireland's women's team placed 7th at the 2025 World Games in China beating hosts China to come 7th.

Ireland qualified teams for Men and Women for the 2026 European Sixes Lacrosse Championships in Salou, Spain the first opportunity to qualify for the LA Olympics, Ireland need to place top 5 to qualify for the 2027 World Championships in Colorado.

== Squads ==
=== Men ===
Ireland men's squad for 2026 European Sixes Lacrosse Championships in Salou, Spain

- Ryan Clarke
- Daniel Clarke – (Canada) Toronto Varsity Blues
- Ronan Jacoby
- Sean Holland – (United States) Lincoln Park Lacrosse Club
- Kevin Lynch
- Conor Foley
- Matt Duncan
- Boomer Staunton – (United States) Assumption Greyhounds
- Michael Lynch
- Patrick Brosnan
- Patrick Corbett
- Joe Walsh (GK)

=== Women ===
Ireland womens squad for 2026 European Sixes Lacrosse Championships in Salou, Spain

- Annie Devine – (United States) Florida State Seminoles
- Orla Howlett – (United States) Rhode Island Rams
- Maggie Egan
- Gillian Smith – (United States) Cincinnati Bearcat Bands
- Amy Bolton – (England) Rise
- Amelia Heisler
- Catherine DeKorte
- Niamh Pfaff – (United States) Yale Bulldogs
- Mimi Painting – (United States) Bryant Bulldogs
- Haley Crosson
- Amelie Devine – (United States) Brown Bears
- Julia Ruscio
