= Haudenosaunee women's national lacrosse sixes team =

Haudenosaunee
- WL membership: 2008
- Association: Haudenosaunee Nationals
- Confederation: PALA (Americas)

The Haudenosaunee women's national lacrosse sixes team represents the Haudenosaunee Confederacy internationally in lacrosse tournaments. They compete in lacrosse sixes.

They are under the Haudenosaunee Nationals organization.

== History ==
The Haudenosaunee, under the Iroquois Nationals organization took part in the inaugural PALA Sixes Cup in Auburndale, Florida in September 2021. They won over Puerto Rico in the final. Claudia Jimerson of the Cayuga, as coach conducted tryouts for the first sixes team amidst the COVID-19 pandemic. The 2021 PALA Sixes team was led by head coach Liz Belville.

Under the name Haudenosaunee, the team took part at the Super Sixes in October 2021, the first international competition by World Lacrosse.

The team was originally ineligible to take part at the 2022 World Games in Birmingham. However the team was later allowed to join. The Haudenosaunee did not podium.

The team won the next two editions of the PALA Sixes Cup in 2023 and 2025, also defeating Puerto Rico in the finals in both occasions.

They have campaigned for their inclusion at the 2028 Summer Olympics in Los Angeles despite the Haudenosaunee Confederacy not being recognized as a sovereign nation by the United Nations or it having a federation which is a member of the International Olympic Committee.

== Competitive record ==
=== World Games ===
| Year | Host | GP | W | L | GF | GA | Finish |
|---|---|---|---|---|---|---|---|
| 2022 | United States | 4 | 2 | 2 | 60 | 75 | 5th |
| 2025 | China | Did not qualify | | | | | − |
| Total | 1/2 | 4 | 2 | 2 | 60 | 75 | No medal |

=== Pan-American Sixes Championship ===
| Year | Host | GP | W | L | GF | GA | Finish |
|---|---|---|---|---|---|---|---|
| 2026 | Canada | To be determined | | | | | − |
| Total | − | – | – | – | – | – | No medal |

== Fixtures and results ==
=== 2020s ===
| 3 September 2021 2021 PALA Sixes Cup Round Robin | Haudenosaunee | 32-2 | Colombia | Auburndale, Florida |
| 09:00 (UTC−04:00) | | | | Stadium: Lake Myrtle Sports Complex |

| 3 September 2021 2021 PALA Sixes Cup Round Robin | Haudenosaunee | 17-7 | Puerto Rico | Auburndale, Florida |
| 12:00 (UTC−04:00) | | | | Stadium: Lake Myrtle Sports Complex |

| 4 September 2021 2021 PALA Sixes Cup Round Robin | Haudenosaunee | 20-4 | Argentina | Auburndale, Florida |
| 11:00 (UTC−04:00) | | | | Stadium: Lake Myrtle Sports Complex |

| 4 September 2021 2021 PALA Sixes Cup Semifinals | Haudenosaunee | 20-0 | Colombia | Auburndale, Florida |
| 16:00 (UTC−04:00) | | | | Stadium: Lake Myrtle Sports Complex |

| 5 September 2021 2021 PALA Sixes Cup Championship | Haudenosaunee | 19-7 | Puerto Rico | Auburndale, Florida |
| 13:00 (UTC−04:00) | | | | Stadium: Lake Myrtle Sports Complex |

2021 PALA Sixes Cup roster
| Name | Position |
|---|---|
| Ivy Santana | Attack |
| Taylor Frink | Attack |
| Jacelyn Lazore | Attack |
| Jordan Coulon | Midfield |
| Lois Garlow | Midfield |
| Jalyn Jimerson | Midfield |
| Sierra Cockerille | Midfield |
| Lynnzee Miller | Midfield |
| Ewehegwahs Williams | Defense |
| Cassandra "Bean" Minerd | Defense |
| Beretta Santana | Defense |
| Jenna Haring | Goalie |
| Elizabeth Beville | Head coach |
| Naomi Walser | Assistant Head Coach |
| Joseph Manna | Assistant Head Coach |
| Shaniece Mohawk | General Manager |

| 23 October 2021 2021 Super Sixes Tournament | Haudenosaunee | 13-20 | Canada | Sparks, Maryland |
| 12:00 (UTC−04:00) | | Report | | Stadium: William G. Tierney Field |

| 23 October 2021 2021 Super Sixes Tournament | Haudenosaunee | 9-19 | United States | Sparks, Maryland |
| 17:00 (UTC−04:00) | | Report | | Stadium: William G. Tierney Field |

| 24 October 2021 2021 Super Sixes Tournament | Haudenosaunee | 7-18 | United States | Sparks, Maryland |
| 08:15 (UTC−04:00) | | Report | | Stadium: William G. Tierney Field |

| 24 October 2021 2021 Super Sixes Tournament | Haudenosaunee | 6-24 | Canada | Sparks, Maryland |
| 10:45 (UTC−04:00) | | Report | | Stadium: William G. Tierney Field |

2021 Super Sixes roster
| Name | Position |
|---|---|
| Taylor Frink | - |
| Miya Scanlan | - |
| Lynnzee Miller | - |
| Lauren Scanlan | - |
| Timmia Bomberry | - |
| Sierra Cockerille | - |
| Paisley Cook | - |
| Jordan Coulon | - |
| Lois Garlow | - |
| Jalyn Jimerson | - |
| Larson Sundown | - |
| Koleton Marquis | - |
| Selena Lasota | - |
| Tiana Bomberry | - |
| Cassandra "Bean" Minerd | - |
| Paige Crandall | - |
| Kedoh Hill | - |
| Jenna Haring | - |
| Elizabeth Beville | Head coach |
| Naomi Walser | Assistant Coach |
| Joseph Manna | Assistant Coach |
| Shaniece Mohawk | General Manager |
| Claudia Jimerson | Executive Advisor |
| Alison Bruno | Advisor |
| Betty Lyons | Events Coordinator |
| Kara Gray | Communications |

| 12 July 2022 2022 Preliminary | Haudenosaunee | 10-17 | Israel | Birmingham, Alabama |
| 12:00 (UTC-05:00) | | Report | | Stadium: PNC Field |

| 13 July 2022 2022 Preliminary | Haudenosaunee | 10-11 | Great Britain | Birmingham, Alabama |
| 10:30 (UTC-05:00) | | Report | | Stadium: PNC Field |

| 14 July 2022 2022 Preliminary | Haudenosaunee | 7-19 | Canada | Birmingham, Alabama |
| 14:45 (UTC-05:00) | | Report | | Stadium: PNC Field |

| 15 July 2022 2022 7th Place | Haudenosaunee | 13-8 | Czech Republic | Birmingham, Alabama |
| 10:30 (UTC-05:00) | | Report | | Stadium: PNC Field |

2022 World Games roster
| Number | Name |
|---|---|
| 10 | Tiana Bomberry |
| 17 | Timmia Bomberry |
| 21 | Paisley Cook |
| 34 | Jordan Coulon |
| 22 | Paige Crandall |
| 18 | Lois Garlow |
| 4 | Jalyn Jimerson |
| 19 | Jacelyn Lazore |
| 16 | Cassandra Minerd |
| 24 | Fawn Porter |
| 1 | Ivy Santana |
| 2 | Miya Scanlan |
| Head coach | Elizabeth Beville |

| 7 October 2022 2022 Super Sixes Tournament | Haudenosaunee | 4-23 | Canada | Oshawa |
| 20:30 (UTC−05:00) | | Report | | Stadium: Civic Stadium Field |

| 8 October 2022 2022 Super Sixes Tournament | Haudenosaunee | 12-9 | England | Oshawa |
| 10:00 (UTC−05:00) | | Report | | Stadium: Civic Stadium Field |

| 8 October 2022 2022 Super Sixes Tournament | Haudenosaunee | 9-8 | Canada | Oshawa |
| 14:00 (UTC−05:00) | | Report | | Stadium: Civic Stadium Field |

| 9 October 2022 2022 Super Sixes Tournament | Haudenosaunee | 11-12 | England | Oshawa |
| 10:00 (UTC−05:00) | | | | Stadium: Civic Stadium Field |

| 9 October 2022 2022 Super Sixes Tournament Gold Medal | Haudenosaunee | 4-17 | Canada | Oshawa |
| 12:00 (UTC−05:00) | | | | Stadium: Civic Stadium Field |

2022 Super Sixes roster
| Name | Position |
|---|---|
| Jadie Burns | - |
| Kenedy Cooper | - |
| Callison Foreman | - |
| Mirabella Lazore | - |
| Miya Scanlan | - |
| Elora Waardenburg | - |
| Avery Doran | - |
| Timmia Bomberry | - |
| Paisley Cook | - |
| Fawn Porter | - |
| Tiana Bomberry | - |
| Lottie Gill | - |
| Cassandra "Bean" Minerd | - |
| Ally Trice | - |
| Paige Crandall | - |
| Tim Bomberry | Head coach |
| Naomi Walser | Assistant Coach |
| Joseph Manna | Assistant Coach |
| Shaniece Mohawk | General Manager |
| Claudia Jimerson | Director of Women's Operations |
