= Israel women's national lacrosse sixes team =

National sports team

Israel
- WL membership: 2011
- Association: Israel Lacrosse Association
- Confederation: ELF(Europe)

First international
- Haudenosaunee 10–17 Israel (July 2022; Birmingham, United States)
Medal record
European Championships
Gold medal – first place	2026 Salou	Team

The Israel women's national lacrosse sixes team represents Israel internationally in lacrosse tournaments. They compete in lacrosse sixes, the form of lacrosse which will feature in the 2028 Summer Olympics, rather than the full field format. It is sanctioned by Israel Lacrosse Association.

== History ==
In May 2022, Israel announced its roster for its women's lacrosse sixes national team the 2022 World Games in Birmingham, United States. The Israel Lacrosse Association named Kara Carlin and Kimberly Dubansky and co-head coaches. The team finished fifth in the games.

Israel took part at the 2025 EuroLax Sixes Cup, to attempt to qualify for the 2025 World Games in Chengdu. Israel finished as bronze medallists, but missed a berth to the games in China as only the two finalists qualified.

Under head coach Kara Mupo, Israel then went on to participate at the 2026 European Sixes Lacrosse Championships in Salou, Spain. They won the championships and also qualified for the 2027 World Lacrosse Sixes Championships

== Competitive record ==
=== World Lacrosse Sixes Championships ===
Year	Result
(United States) 2027	Qualified

=== European Sixes Lacrosse Championships ===
Year	Result
(Spain) 2026	(gold) 1st place
