= Great Britain men's national lacrosse sixes team =

National sports team

Great Britain
- Association: British Lacrosse
- Confederation: N/A

World Championship
- Appearances: None

First international
- (United Kingdom) Great Britain 27–10 Germany (25 February 2022; Santo António, Portugal)

Biggest win
- (United Kingdom) Great Britain 35–0 Belgium (25 February 2022; Santo António, Portugal)

Biggest defeat
- (United Kingdom) Great Britain 11–22 Canada (11 July 2022; Birmingham, United States)
- Website: britishlacrosse.org

A Great Britain men's national lacrosse sixes team is under the auspices of British Lacrosse.

The Home Nations have their own national federations which are members of World Lacrosse.

== History ==
Great Britain historically fielded a traditional men's lacrosse side. Their first ever game was in 1883 against Canada. The team played Canada against in the 1908 Summer Olympics when traditional lacrosse was last organized as a regular event. Great Britain fielded a team again in the 1928 and 1948 Summer Olympics when lacrosse was a demonstration event.

In 2021, when World Lacrosse became a member of the International Olympic Committee (IOC). The federation created a new variant of the sport called lacrosse sixes. This prompted the organization of a Great Britain lacrosse sixes team for the lacrosse event of the 2022 World Games in Birmingham. They qualified on the basis of England traditional lacrosse team's finishing at the 2018 World Lacrosse Championship. Two Great Britain teams (Red and White) took part at the 2022 Euro Lax Sixes Cup in February 2022.

They finished fourth in the men's lacrosse event of the 2022 World Games in July.

Lacrosse would potentially return to the Summer Olympics, when the sixes variant of the sport was included in the 2028 Summer Olympics calendar.

They played at the Euro Lax Sixes Cup in February 2024 and the USA Lacrosse Experience in October 2024.

In December 2024, UK Sport announced funding for a potential 2028 Summer Olympics qualification bid.

== Competitive record ==
=== World Games ===
Year	Host	GP	W	L	GF	GA	Finish
2022	United States	5	3	2	73	78	4th
2025	China	Women's event only					–
Total	−	5	3	2	73	78	No Medal

=== European Sixes Lacrosse Championships ===
Year	Host	GP	W	L	GF	GA	Finish
2026	Spain	To be determined					
Total	−	0	0	0	0	0	No Medal

=== Euro Lax Sixes Cup ===
Year	Host	GP	W	L	GF	GA	Finish
2022	Portugal	5	5	0	107	19	(gold) (White)
2022	Portugal	5	4	1	108	38	(silver) (Red)
2023	Portugal	—					1st place, gold medalist(s)
2024	Portugal	5	5	0	125	49	1st place, gold medalist(s)
Total	−	5	3	2	73	78	3 golds, 1 silver
