= Canada women's national lacrosse sixes team =

National sports team

Canada
- Association: Lacrosse Canada
- Confederation: PALA (Americas)
- Head coach: Shawn Williams

First international
- Canada 20–13 Haudenosaunee (October 23, 2021; Sparks, United States)
Medal record
World Games
Gold medal – first place	2022 Birmingham	Team
Silver medal – second place	2025 Chengdu	Team

The Canada women's national lacrosse sixes team represents Canada internationally in lacrosse tournaments. They compete in lacrosse sixes, the form of lacrosse which will feature in the 2028 Summer Olympics, rather than the full field format. It is sanctioned by Lacrosse Canada.

== History ==
Canada fielded its first women's lacrosse sixes in 2021. Scott Teether was appointed as coach in August 2021. The team debuted at the Super Sixes event at Sparks, Maryland in October 2021.

Canada took part at the 2022 World Games in Birmingham where they won the women's lacrosse gold medal at the United States' expense.

Canada, now under coach Shawn Williams, won the inaugural Women's Super Sixes tournament in Oshawa in October 2022.

At the 2025 World Games in Chengdu, China, Canada lost to the United States in the gold medal match, settling for silver.

== Team records ==
=== World Games ===
World Games record
Year	Result	Matches	Wins	Draws	Losses	PF	PA	Coach
(United States) 2022	Gold medal	5	5	0	0	75	41	Scott Teether
(China) 2025	Silver medal	5	4	0	1	88	35	Shawn Williams
Total	2/2	10	9	0	1	163	76	—

- Lacrosse is conducted in the standard field lacrosse format at the 2017 World Games

== Head coaches ==
- (Canada) Scott Teeter (2021–2022)
- (Canada) Shawn Williams (2022–)
