= Philippines men's national lacrosse sixes team =

Philippines
- WL membership: 2014
- Association: Philippines Lacrosse Association
- Confederation: APLU (Asia–Pacific)
- Head coach: Justin Manjares

The Philippines men's national lacrosse sixes team represents the Philippines internationally in lacrosse tournaments. They compete in lacrosse sixes, the form of lacrosse which will feature in the 2028 Summer Olympics, rather than the full field format. It is sanctioned by the Philippines Lacrosse Association.

== History ==
The Philippines Lacrosse Association (PLA), established in 2012 have entered a men's national team in standard field lacrosse in the 2018 and 2023 editions of the World Lacrosse Men's Championship. The PLA formed a lacrosse sixes team.

While lacrosse, was introduced as an official sport at the 2028 Summer Olympics in Los Angeles. It will be the sixes format that will be used rather than the standard format.

The Philippines men's national lacrosse sixes team took part at the 2023 World Lacrosse Super Sixes in Hong Kong finishing last at sixth place. In the 2024 edition also in Hong Kong, the team coached by Justin Manjares finished as runners-up losing to the FOGO Stealers in the final.

Manjares will reprise his role as head coach for the Philippines' stint at the 2026 Asia-Pacific Sixes Championships in Australia.

== Competitive record ==
=== Summer Olympics ===
Year	Host	GP	W	L	GF	GA	Finish
2028	United States	To be determined					−
Total	−	–	–	–	–	–	No medal

=== World Games ===
Year	Host	GP	W	L	GF	GA	Finish
2017	Poland	Field lacrosse format used					−
2022	United States	Did not qualify					−
2025	China	No men's tournament					−
Total	−	–	–	–	–	–	No medal

=== Asia Pacific Sixes Championship ===
Year	Host	GP	W	L	GF	GA	Finish
2026	Australia	To be determined					Bronze medalist (over China)
Total	−	–	–	–	–	–	No medal
