= United States men's national lacrosse sixes team =

National sports team

United States
- Association: USA Lacrosse
- Confederation: PALA (Americas)
- Head coach: Andy Shay

First international
- United States 18–17 Canada (October 23, 2021; Sparks, United States)
Medal record
World Games
Silver medal – second place	2022 Birmingham	Team
Pan-American Championship
Gold medal – first place	2026 Oshawa	Team

The United States men's national lacrosse sixes team represents the United States internationally in lacrosse tournaments. They compete in lacrosse sixes, the form of lacrosse which will feature in the 2028 Summer Olympics, rather than the full field format. It is sanctioned by USA Lacrosse.

== History ==
Lacrosse was included in the Olympics program in 2021 and will be played at the 2028 Summer Olympics in Los Angeles. However, the lacrosse sixes format developed by World Lacrosse will be adopted in the Olympics rather than the standard field lacrosse format.

USA Lacrosse held its first ever training event for its lacrosse sixes national program in July 2021. The United States men's national lacrosse sixes later played at the World Lacrosse Super Sixes in October 2021. Their first officially sanctioned event was the 2022 World Games in Birmingham where they finished as silver medalists.

The United States will participate at the Pan-American Sixes Lacrosse Championship. They are also expected to represent the host country, at the 2028 Olympics in Los Angeles.

== Competitive record ==
=== Olympic Games ===
Olympic Games record
Year	Result	Matches	Wins	Draws	Losses	PF	PA	Coach
(United States) 2028	Qualified as hosts							
Total	0/1							—

=== World Games ===
World Games record
Year	Result	Matches	Wins	Draws	Losses	PF	PA	Coach
(United States) 2022	Silver medal	5	4	0	1	89	64	
Total	1/1	5	4	0	1	89	64	—

=== Pan-American Championship ===
Pan-American Sixes Lacrosse Championship record
Year	Result	Matches	Wins	Draws	Losses	PF	PA	Coach
(Canada) 2026	Champions	4	4	0	0	98	37	Andy Shay
Total	1/1	4	4	0	0	98	37	—
