= China women's national lacrosse sixes team =

National sports team

China
- WL membership: 2009
- Confederation: APLU (Asia-Pacific)
- Head coach: Xiao Xiao (2025)

The China women's national lacrosse sixes team represents China internationally in lacrosse tournaments. They compete in lacrosse sixes, the form of lacrosse which will feature in the 2028 Summer Olympics, rather than the full field format.

== History ==
China has focused on developing its lacrosse sixes teams over the standard field format which required more players. In 2023, the Chinese women's team finished fifth and third place at the Hong Kong Open and Super Sixes respectively.

At the 2025 World Games hosted in Chengdu, hosts China fielded a women's lacrosse sixes team which was coached by Xiao Xiao.

The supervision of the sport of lacrosse was handed over to the Chinese Handball Association in December 2025.

At the 2026 Asian Lacrosse Games in Chengdu, China won the women's tournament.

== Team records ==
=== World Games ===
World Games record
Year	Result	Matches	Wins	Draws	Losses	PF	PA	Coach
(United States) 2022	Did not qualify							
(China) 2025	8th place	4	0	0	4	10	86	Xiao Xiao
Total	1/2	4	0	0	4	10	86	—

- Lacrosse is conducted in the standard field lacrosse format at the 2017 World Games
