= Japan men's national lacrosse sixes team =

National sports team

Japan
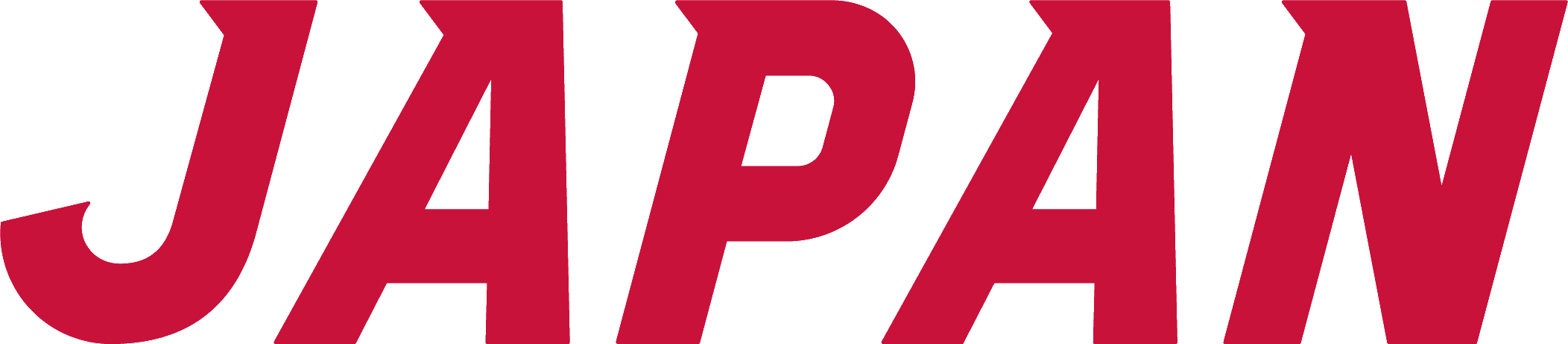
- Association: Japan Lacrosse Association
- Confederation: APLU (Asia-Pacific)
Medal record
World Games
Bronze medal – third place	2022 Birmingham	Team

The Japan men's national lacrosse sixes team represents Japan internationally in lacrosse tournaments. They compete in lacrosse sixes, the form of lacrosse which will feature in the 2028 Summer Olympics, rather than the full field format. It is sanctioned by Japan Lacrosse Association.

== History ==
The Japan Lacrosse Association (JLA) declared in 2020 its intention to develop a dedicated lacrosse sixes program. The JLA launched the "Sixes" initiative in mid-2021.

The Japanese men's lacrosse sixes team participated at the 2022 World Games in Birmingham. They won over Great Britain to win a bronze medal. The team is comprise of mostly office workers who took a paid leave.

They will join the 2026 Asia-Pacific Sixes Championship.

== Team records ==
=== World Games ===
World Games record
Year	Result	Matches	Wins	Draws	Losses	PF	PA	Coach
(United States) 2022	Bronze medal	5	2	0	3	81	98	
(China) 2025	No men's tournament							
Total	1/1	5	2	0	3	81	98	—

- Lacrosse is conducted in the standard field lacrosse format at the 2017 World Games
