= Saudi Arabia women's national lacrosse sixes team =

Saudi Arabia
- Nickname(s): Al-Akhdar (Greens)
- WL membership: 2021
- Association: Saudi Lacrosse Federation
- Confederation: APLU (Asia-Pacific)

The Saudi Arabia women's national lacrosse sixes team represents Saudi Arabia internationally in lacrosse tournaments. They compete in lacrosse sixes, the form of lacrosse which will feature in the 2028 Summer Olympics, rather than the full field format. It is organized by the Saudi Lacrosse Federation.

== History ==
The Saudi Lacrosse Federation formed a women's lacrosse sixes team. Their first participation in an international competition was the inaugural Asian Lacrosse Games in Samarkand, Uzbekistan. They took part in training camps in preparation for the tournament. The Saudi team won the gold medal, deating India in the final.

The second edition of the Asian Lacrosse Games was held in February 2026 in Riyadh. The host country's women's team finished last among three national teams.
