= Saudi Lacrosse Federation =

Governing body of lacrosse in Saudi Arabia

- Sport: Lacrosse
- Jurisdiction: National
- Abbreviation: SLF
- Founded: 2020
- Affiliation: World Lacrosse
- Affiliation date: 2021
- Regional affiliation: APLU
- Affiliation date: 2024
- Headquarters: Riyadh
- President: Fahad Almoamar
- Chairman: Fahad Almoamar
- CEO: Fahad Alarifi

Official website
- slf.sa
- (Saudi Arabia)

Saudi Lacrosse Federation (SLF; Arabic: الاتحاد السعودي للاكروس) is the governing body for lacrosse in Saudi Arabia.

== History ==
The Saudi Lacrosse Federation (SLF) was established in 2020 and immediately started a four-stage program to promote lacrosse in the country.

Saudi Arabia joined World Lacrosse as an associate member in June 2021

In late 2022, the SLF culminated its earlier program by establishing the first lacrosse club, the Saudi Lacrosse Club.

The Asia Pacific Lacrosse Union admitted Saudi Arabia in 2024 as a full member. The country's women's sixes team won the inaugural 2024 Asian Lacrosse Games in Samarkand, Uzbekistan. Saudi Arabia hosted the 2026 Asian Lacrosse Games in Riyadh.
