= Asian Lacrosse Games =

- Sport: Lacrosse sixes
- Founded: 2024
- No. of teams: 4
- Countries: "Emerging" member nations of the APLU
- Most recent champions: M: Hong Kong (1st title); W: China (1st title)

The Asian Lacrosse Games is a lacrosse sixes tournament for "emerging" national teams in Asia.

== History ==
The first ever Asian Lacrosse Games was held in 2024 in Samarkand, Uzbekistan. Only a women's lacrosse sixes tournament was held. Saudi Arabia held the second edition originally scheduled in 2025 but postponed to February 2026. The men's tournament was introduced.

== Results ==
=== Men ===
#	Year	Host	Champions	Runners-up	Third place	Fourth place	Ref
1	2024	(Uzbekistan); Samarkand	Not held				
2	2026 (February)	(Saudi Arabia); Riyadh	India	Iraq	Saudi Arabia	Pakistan	
3	2026 (April)	(China); Chengdu	Hong Kong	China	Malaysia	Saudi Arabia	

=== Women ===
#	Year	Host	Champions	Runners-up	Third place	Fourth place	Ref
1	2024	(Uzbekistan); Samarkand	Saudi Arabia	India	Uzbekistan	N/A	
2	2026 (February)	(Saudi Arabia); Riyadh	India	Pakistan	Saudi Arabia	N/A	
3	2026 (April)	(China); Chengdu	China	Hong Kong	Singapore	Pakistan	
