= Haudenosaunee at the 2022 World Games =

Haudenosaunee at the World Games 2022
- IOC code: HNL
- NOC: N/A

in Birmingham, United States July 7 – 17, 2022
- Competitors: 24 in 1 sport
- Medals: Gold 0 Silver 0 Bronze 0 Total 0

World Games appearances
- 1981; 1985; 1989; 1993; 1997; 2001; 2005; 2009; 2013; 2017; 2022; 2025

The Haudenosaunee Nationals, also known as the Iroquois, competed at the 2022 World Games in Birmingham, United States, from July 7 to 17, 2022.

The only representative team in the 2022 World Games not represented by a National Olympic Committee, they competed solely in lacrosse. They finished in fifth place in the event for the men's team and seventh place for the women's team.

== Competitors ==
Sport	Men	Women	Total	Events
Lacrosse	12	12	24	2
Total	12	12	24	2

== Lacrosse ==
Originally the Haudenosaunee were not eligible to qualify due to not being represented by a National Olympic Committee. Its men's lacrosse team would have qualified through placing third at the 2018 World Lacrosse Championship. The Haudenosaunee were declared eligible after Ireland vacated their berth in their favor.

Like their men's counterpart, the women's team was deemed eligible to qualify.

Both the men's and women's team failed to make a podium finish.

Team	Event	Group stage				Finals / consolations	
Team	Event	Opposition Score	Opposition Score	Opposition Score	Rank	Opposition Score	Rank
Haudenosaunee men	Men's team tournament	Canada; L 9–21	Israel; W 16–12	Japan; L 16–20	3	Australia; W 19–12	5
Haudenosaunee women	Women's team tournament	Israel; L 10–17	Great Britain; L 10–11	Canada; L 7–19	4	Czech Republic; W 13–8	7
