= Japan women's national lacrosse sixes team =

National sports team

Japan
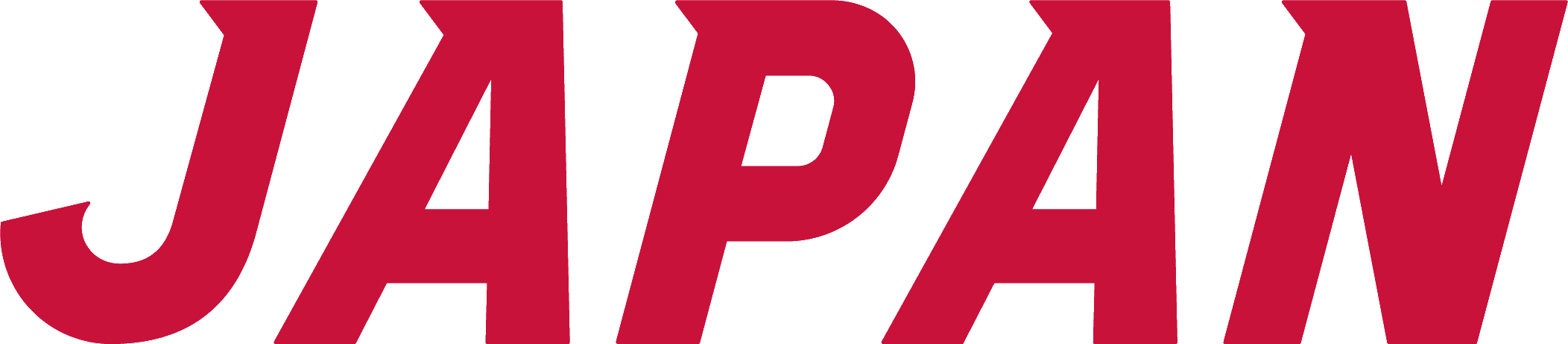
- Association: Japan Lacrosse Association
- Confederation: APLU (Asia-Pacific)
- Head coach: Masakazu Nagashima

The Japan women's national lacrosse sixes team represents Japan internationally in lacrosse tournaments. They compete in lacrosse sixes, the form of lacrosse which will feature in the 2028 Summer Olympics, rather than the full field format. It is sanctioned by Japan Lacrosse Association.

== History ==
The Japan Lacrosse Association (JLA) declared in 2020 its intention to develop a dedicated lacrosse sixes program. The JLA launched the "Sixes" initiative in mid-2021.

The selection process for the Japanese women's lacrosse team that entered the 2022 World Games in Birmingham began in December 2021. Masakazu Nagashima was the head coach for the team which had six months preparation from January 2021. Japan finished in sixth place in the tournament held in July 2022.

Nagashima reprised his role as head coach for Japan at the 2025 World Games in Chengdu, Japan. The team lost to Australia in the bronze medal game, finishing fourth.

They will join the 2026 Asia-Pacific Sixes Championship.

== Team records ==
=== World Games ===
World Games record
| Year | Result | Matches | Wins | Draws | Losses | PF | PA | Coach |
|---|---|---|---|---|---|---|---|---|
| (United States) 2022 | 6th place | 4 | 1 | 0 | 3 | 45 | 45 | Masakazu Nagashima |
| (China) 2025 | 4th place | 5 | 2 | 0 | 3 | 60 | 70 | Masakazu Nagashima |
| Total | 2/2 | 9 | 3 | 0 | 6 | 105 | 115 | |

- Lacrosse is conducted in the standard field lacrosse format at the 2017 World Games

== Head coaches ==
- (Japan) Masakazu Nagashima (2022, 2025–)
