= List of IOC country codes =

Standard identifiers for Olympic teams

This is a list of International Olympic Committee (IOC) country codes. The IOC began to use standard codes in 1976, replacing a prior system of codes chosen by the local organizing committee of each games which often varied based on the local language.

== Current NOCs ==
There are 206 current NOCs (National Olympic Committees) within the Olympic Movement. The following tables show the currently used code for each NOC and any different codes used in past Games, per the official reports from those Games. Some of the past code usage is further explained in the following sections. Codes used specifically for a Summer Games only or a Winter Games only, within the same year, are indicated by "S" and "W" respectively.

Code	National Olympic Committee	Other codes used	Link
AFG	Afghanistan		
ALB	Albania		
ALG	Algeria	AGR (1964); AGL (1968 S) from Spanish Argelia	
AND	Andorra		
ANG	Angola	ANO (as referenced in IAAF World Championships Beijing 2015 Statistics Handbook)	
ANT	Antigua and Barbuda		
ARG	Argentina		
ARM	Armenia		
ARU	Aruba		
ASA	American Samoa	AMS	
AUS	Australia		
AUT	Austria	current code from French Autriche	
AZE	Azerbaijan		
BAH	Bahamas		
BAN	Bangladesh		
BAR	Barbados	BAD (1964) (Note: Barbados did not send a delegation to the 1964 Summer Olympics, but is nevertheless listed as a participant with an official country code in the official Tokyo 1964 results book.)	
BDI	Burundi		
BEL	Belgium		
BEN	Benin	DAY (1964); DAH (1968–1976) as Dahomey	
BER	Bermuda		
BHU	Bhutan		
BIH	Bosnia and Herzegovina	BSH (1992 S), BOS; current code from Bosnian Bosna i Hercegovina	
BIZ	Belize	HBR (1968–1972) from French Honduras britannique as British Honduras; also BHO	
BLR	Belarus		
BOL	Bolivia		
BOT	Botswana		
BRA	Brazil		
BRN	Bahrain	BHR	
BRU	Brunei		
BUL	Bulgaria		
BUR	Burkina Faso	VOL (1972–1984) as Upper Volta; also BKF	
CAF	Central African Republic	AFC (1968)	
CAM	Cambodia	CAB (1964); KHM (1972) as Khmer Republic	
CAN	Canada		
CAY	Cayman Islands		
CGO	Republic of the Congo		
CHA	Chad	CHD (1964)	
CHI	Chile	CIL (1956 W; 1960 S) from Italian Cile	
CHN	China	PRC (1952 S) as People's Republic of China	
CIV	Ivory Coast	IVC (1964); CML (1968) from Spanish Costa de Marfil; current code from French Côte d'Ivoire	
CMR	Cameroon		
COD	Democratic Republic of the Congo	COK (1968) as Congo-Kinshasa; ZAI (1972–1996) as Zaire	
COK	Cook Islands	CKI	
COL	Colombia		
COM	Comoros		
CPV	Cape Verde	CVD	
CRC	Costa Rica	COS (1964)	
CRO	Croatia		
CUB	Cuba		
CYP	Cyprus		
CZE	Czech Republic		
DEN	Denmark	DAN (1960 S; 1968 W); DIN (1968 S); previous codes taken from Italian Danimarca, French Danemark and Spanish Dinamarca	
DJI	Djibouti		
DMA	Dominica	DMN	
DOM	Dominican Republic		
ECU	Ecuador		
EGY	Egypt	RAU (1960; 1968); UAR (1964) as United Arab Republic; previous codes taken from Italian Repubblica Araba Unita, French République Arabe Unie and Spanish República Árabe Unida	
ERI	Eritrea		
ESA	El Salvador	SAL (1964–1976)	
ESP	Spain	SPA (1956–1964; 1968 W); current code taken from French Espagne or Spanish España	
EST	Estonia		
ETH	Ethiopia	ETI (1960; 1968)	
FIJ	Fiji	FIG (1960) from Italian Figi	
FIN	Finland		
FRA	France		
FSM	Federated States of Micronesia		
GAB	Gabon		
GAM	The Gambia		
GBR	Great Britain	GRB (1956 W–1960); GBI (1956 athletics; 1964)	
GBS	Guinea-Bissau		
GEO	Georgia		
GEQ	Equatorial Guinea	current code taken from French Guinée équatoriale	
GER	Germany		
GHA	Ghana		
GRE	Greece		
GRN	Grenada		
GUA	Guatemala	GUT (1964)	
GUI	Guinea		
GUM	Guam		
GUY	Guyana	GUA (1960); GUI (1964); BGU	
HAI	Haiti		
HKG	Hong Kong	HOK (1960–1968)	
HON	Honduras		
HUN	Hungary	UNG (1956 W; 1960 S) from Italian Ungheria	
INA	Indonesia	INS (1960)	
IND	India		
IRI	Iran	IRN (1956–1988); IRA (1968 W); current code from Islamic Republic of Iran	
IRL	Ireland	current code taken from French Irlande. EIR (1956 athletics; see Ireland at the Olympics § Name of the country)	
IRQ	Iraq	IRK (1960; 1968) from French/Spanish Irak	
ISL	Iceland	ICE (1960 W; 1964 S); current code taken from French Islande, Icelandic Ísland or Spanish Islandia	
ISR	Israel		
ISV	Virgin Islands	current code taken from French Îles Vierges (des États-Unis)	
ITA	Italy		
IVB	British Virgin Islands	BVI current code taken from French Îles Vierges britanniques	
JAM	Jamaica		
JOR	Jordan		
JPN	Japan	GIA (1956 W; 1960 S) from Italian Giappone; JAP (1960 W)	
KAZ	Kazakhstan		
KEN	Kenya		
KGZ	Kyrgyzstan		
KIR	Kiribati		
KOR	South Korea	COR (1956 W; 1960 S; 1968 S; 1972 S); previous code taken from Italian Corea, French Corée and Spanish Corea	
KOS	Kosovo		
KSA	Saudi Arabia	ARS (1968–1976) from French Arabie saoudite; SAU (1980–1984); current code from Kingdom of Saudi Arabia	
KUW	Kuwait		
LAO	Laos		
LAT	Latvia		
LBA	Libya	LYA (1964); LBY (1968 W)	
LBN	Lebanon	LEB (1960 W; 1964 S); LIB (1964–2016) from French Liban	
LBR	Liberia		
LCA	Saint Lucia	STL	
LES	Lesotho		
LIE	Liechtenstein	LIC (1956 W; 1964 S; 1968 W)	
LTU	Lithuania	LIT (1992 W)	
LUX	Luxembourg		
MAD	Madagascar	MAG (1964)	
MAR	Morocco	MRC (1964); current code from French Maroc	
MAS	Malaysia	MAL (1964–1988)	
MAW	Malawi		
MDA	Moldova	MLD (1994)	
MDV	Maldives		
MEX	Mexico		
MGL	Mongolia	MON (1968 W)	
MHL	Marshall Islands		
MKD	North Macedonia	current code taken from Macedonian Македонија/Makedonija	
MLI	Mali		
MLT	Malta	MAT (1960–1964)	
MNE	Montenegro		
MON	Monaco		
MOZ	Mozambique		
MRI	Mauritius		
MTN	Mauritania		
MYA	Myanmar	BIR (1948–1960; 1968–1988) from French Birmanie; BUR (1964) as Burma	
NAM	Namibia		
NCA	Nicaragua	NCG (1964); NIC (1968)	
NED	Netherlands	OLA (1956 W) from Italian Olanda; NET (1960 W); PBA (1960 S) from Italian Paesi Bassi; NLD (1964 S); HOL (1968–1988) as Holland; current code taken from Dutch Nederland	
NEP	Nepal		
NGR	Nigeria	NIG (1960 S); NGA (1964)	
NIG	Niger	NGR (1964)	
NOR	Norway		
NRO	Nauru	NRU (1996–2024); current code taken from Nauruan Naoero	
NZL	New Zealand	NZE (1960; 1968 W)	
OMA	Oman	OMN	
PAK	Pakistan		
PAN	Panama		
PAR	Paraguay		
PER	Peru		
PHI	Philippines	FIL (1960; 1968) from Spanish Filipinas and Italian Filippine	
PLE	Palestine		
PLW	Palau	from archaic English Pelew	
PNG	Papua New Guinea	NGY (1976–1980); NGU (1984–1988)	
POL	Poland		
POR	Portugal		
PRK	North Korea	NKO (1964 S; 1968 W); CDN (1968) from French Corée du Nord or Spanish Corea del Norte; current code from People's Republic of Korea	
PUR	Puerto Rico	PRI (1960); PRO (1968)	
QAT	Qatar		
ROU	Romania	ROM (1956–1960; 1972–2006); RUM (1964–1968) from obsolete spelling Rumania; current code from French Roumanie	
RSA	South Africa	SAF (1960–1972) current code from Republic of South Africa	
RUS	Russia	From 1994 to 2016	
RWA	Rwanda		
SAM	Samoa	WSM (1984–1996) as Western Samoa	
SEN	Senegal	SGL (1964)	
SEY	Seychelles		
SGP	Singapore	SIN (1959–2016)	
SKN	Saint Kitts and Nevis	STK	
SLE	Sierra Leone	SLA (1968)	
SLO	Slovenia		
SMR	San Marino	SMA (1960–1964)	
SOL	Solomon Islands		
SOM	Somalia		
SRB	Serbia	from Serbian Srbija	
SRI	Sri Lanka	CEY (1948–1964; 1972) as Ceylon; CEI (1968 S) from Spanish Ceilán	
SSD	South Sudan		
STP	São Tomé and Príncipe		
SUD	Sudan		
SUI	Switzerland	SVI (1956 W; 1960 S) from Italian Svizzera; SWI (1960 W; 1964 S); current code from French Suisse	
SUR	Suriname		
SVK	Slovakia		
SWE	Sweden	SVE (1956 W; 1960 S) from Italian Svezia; SUE (1968 S) from Spanish Suecia	
SWZ	Eswatini	current code from former name Swaziland	
SYR	Syria	SIR (1968) from Spanish Siria	
TAN	Tanzania		
TGA	Tonga	TON (1984)	
THA	Thailand		
TJK	Tajikistan		
TKM	Turkmenistan		
TLS	Timor-Leste	current code taken from Portuguese Timor-Leste	
TOG	Togo		
TPE	Chinese Taipei	RCF (1956–1960) as Republic of China, Formosa; TWN (1964–1968) as Taiwan; ROC (1972–1976) as Republic of China	
TTO	Trinidad and Tobago	TRT (1964–1968); TRI (1972–2012)	
TUN	Tunisia		
TUR	Turkey		
TUV	Tuvalu		
UAE	United Arab Emirates		
UGA	Uganda		
UKR	Ukraine		
URU	Uruguay	URG (1968)	
USA	United States	SUA (1960 S) from Italian Stati Uniti d'America; EUA (1968 S) from French États-Unis d'Amérique or Spanish Estados Unidos de América	
UZB	Uzbekistan		
VAN	Vanuatu		
VEN	Venezuela		
VIE	Vietnam	VET (1964); VNM (1952–1975) as Republic of Vietnam	
VIN	Saint Vincent and the Grenadines	STV	
YEM	Yemen		
ZAM	Zambia	NRH (1964) as Northern Rhodesia	
ZIM	Zimbabwe	RHO (1960–1972) as Rhodesia	

== Current NPCs ==
Most National Paralympic Committees (NPC) cover a territory with an active NOC. In these cases the NPC codes matches the IOC codes shown above. The two current NPCs without a corresponding NOC use the following NPC codes.

Code	National Paralympic Committee	Link
FRO	Faroe Islands	The Faroese Sport Organisation for Disabled
MAC	Macau, China	Associação Recreativa dos Deficientes de Macau

== Historic NOCs and teams ==
=== Codes still in use ===
Fourteen historical NOCs or teams have codes that are still used in the IOC results database to refer to past medal winners from these teams.

Code	Nation/Team	Other codes used
AHO	Netherlands Antilles	ATO (1960); NAN (1964); code from French Antilles hollandaises
ANZ	Australasia	Also AUA
BOH	Bohemia	
BWI	British West Indies	ANT (1960) from Antilles
EUA	United Team of Germany	code taken from French Équipe unifiée d'Allemagne
EUN	Unified Team	code from the French Équipe unifiée
FRG	West Germany	ALL (1968 W) from French Allemagne; ALE (1968 S) from Spanish Alemania; GER (1972–1976); code FRG taken from Federal Republic of Germany
GDR	East Germany	ODE (1968 S) from German Ostdeutschland code GDR taken from German Democratic Republic
SCG	Serbia and Montenegro	code from Serbian Србија и Црна Гора / Srbija i Crna Gora
TCH	Czechoslovakia	CSL (1956 W); CZE (1960 W); CSV (1960 S); CZS (1964 S); CHE (1968 S) from Spanish Checoslovaquia; code taken from French Tchécoslovaquie
URS	Soviet Union	SOV (1968 W) code from French Union des républiques socialistes soviétiques (URSS)
VNM	South Vietnam	Code of the State of Vietnam and then Republic of Vietnam from 1952 to 1975.
YUG	Yugoslavia	JUG (1956–1960; 1968 W) from Југославија/Jugoslavija in native languages; YUS (1964 S)

=== Obsolete codes ===
Unlike the previous list, these codes no longer appear in the IOC results database. When a past athlete from one of these teams has won a medal, the new code is shown next to them instead.

Code	Nation (NOC)	Years	Notes
BIR	Burma; From French Birmanie	1948–1988	Now Myanmar (MYA)
CEY	Ceylon	1948–1972	Now Sri Lanka (SRI)
DAH	Dahomey	1964–1976	Now Benin (BEN)
GUI	British Guiana	1948–1964	Now Guyana (GUY). The code former GUI has been reassigned to Guinea (GUI) in 1965 when its new NOC was recognized by the IOC and used publicly in their first competed games in 1968. All formerly known by BGU
HBR	British Honduras; From French Honduras britannique	1968–1972	Now Belize (BIZ)
IHO	Dutch East Indies code from French Indes orientales hollandaises	1934–1938	Now Indonesia (INA)
KHM	Khmer Republic; From French République khmère	1972	Now Cambodia (CAM)
MAL	Malaya; From French Malaisie	1956–1960	Competed independently before the formation of Malaysia in 1963. Now Malaysia (MAS)
NBO	North Borneo	1956	Competed independently before the formation of Malaysia in 1963. Now Malaysia (MAS)
NRH	Northern Rhodesia	1964	Now Zambia (ZAM)
RAU	United Arab Republic code from French République arabe unie	1960	Now Egypt (EGY) and Syria (SYR)
RHO	Rhodesia also Southern Rhodesia and Federation of Rhodesia and Nyasaland until it became Zimbabwe in 1980	1960–1972	Now Zimbabwe (ZIM)
ROC	Republic of China	1932–1976	Medal winners from 1948 and earlier display as Republic of China (ROC), while medal winners from after 1948 display as Chinese Taipei (TPE) under which the team now competes.
RU1	Russian Empire	1900; 1908–1912	Now Russia (RUS)
SAA	Saar	1952	Competed independently before rejoining West Germany (FRG) in 1957
UAR	United Arab Republic	1960–1968	Now Egypt (EGY)
VOL	Upper Volta	1972–1984	Now Burkina Faso (BUR)
WSM	Western Samoa	1984–1996	Now Samoa (SAM)
YAR	North Yemen code from Yemen Arab Republic	1984–1988	Competed independently before Yemeni unification in 1990. Now Yemen (YEM)
YMD	South Yemen code from Yemen Democratic Republic	1988	Competed independently before Yemeni unification in 1990. Now Yemen (YEM)
ZAI	Zaire; From French Zaïre	1972–1996	Now Democratic Republic of the Congo (COD)

Two other significant code changes have occurred, both because of a change in the nation's designation as used by the IOC:

- HOL was changed to NED for the Netherlands for the 1992 Games, reflecting the change in designation from Holland.
- IRN was changed to IRI for Iran for the 1992 Games, reflecting the change in designation to Islamic Republic of Iran.

== Special codes for Olympics ==
Code	Nation/team	Years	Notes
AIN	Individual Neutral Athletes from French Athlètes Individuels Neutres	2024, 2026	Used for Russian and Belarusian athletes competing as neutrals due to the Russian invasion of Ukraine. The delegation will use a flag and a one-off instrumental anthem assigned by the IOC.
ANZ	Australasia	1908–1912	Used in the IOC's medal database to identify the team from Australasia, composed of athletes from both Australia and New Zealand for the 1908 and 1912 Games. Both nations competed separately by 1920.
COR	Korea from French Corée	2018	Used for the unified Korean women's ice hockey team at the 2018 Winter Olympics.
EOR	Refugee Olympic Team from French Équipe olympique des réfugiés	2016–2024	Used for the Refugee Olympic Team, for athletes who have been displaced from their home countries. The IOC code was changed from ROT which was used in 2016.
EUA	United Team of Germany from French Équipe unifiée d'Allemagne	1956–1964	Used in the IOC's medal database to identify the United Team of Germany, composed of athletes representing the NOCs of both East Germany and West Germany for the 1956–1964 Games. The team was simply known as Germany in the official reports for those six games at the time.
EUN	Unified Team from French Équipe unifiée	1992	Used in 1992 (both Summer and Winter Games) for the Unified Team, composed of athletes from most of the former Soviet republics that chose to compete as a unified team. It also consisted of athletes in team sports such as Ice Hockey, Basketball, Handball, and so on. This was primarily due to the breakup of the old Soviet Union in late December of 1991 due to there being less than 7 weeks before the Albertville Games. The Unified Team qualified for the Olympics in competitions as the Soviet Union. Estonia, Latvia and Lithuania entered separately in 1992, whereas Russia and eleven other post-Soviet nations competed independently for the first time in 1994 or 1996.
IOP	Independent Olympic Participants	1992; 2014	Used for independent Olympic participants at the 1992 Summer Olympics as a designation used for athletes from FR Yugoslavia who could not compete as a team due to United Nations sanctions. At the 1992 Summer Olympics IOP was used as a designation for athletes from the Republic of Macedonia too. IOP was also used during the 2014 Winter Olympics in Sochi by Indian athletes due to the Indian Olympic Association suspension.
IOA	Independent Olympic Athletes	2000; 2012; 2016	Used for Individual Olympic Athletes in 2000, a designation used for athletes from Timor-Leste before the formation of its NOC. IOA was used again in the 2012 Games, when it stood for Independent Olympic Athletes, comprising athletes from the former Netherlands Antilles and a runner from South Sudan. The Netherlands Antilles Olympic Committee's membership from the IOC was withdrawn the previous year, and South Sudan had not yet formed an NOC at the time. IOA was used again in 2016 for athletes from Kuwait as a result of the suspension of its National Olympic Committee.
IOC	Athletes from Kuwait	2010–2012	Used as the country code for Athletes from Kuwait, when the Kuwait Olympic Committee was suspended the first time, at the 2010 Summer Youth Olympics, the 2010 Asian Games and the 2011 Asian Winter Games; for the second suspension in 2015–2017, athletes from Kuwait were also competing in several international competitions under the IOC flag, but this time in the team of Individual Olympic Athletes (IOA), including (but not only) in the 2016 Summer Olympics.
MIX	Mixed-NOCs	2010–	Used as the country code for Mixed NOCs at the Youth Olympics.
OAR	Olympic Athletes from Russia	2018	Used for Olympic Athletes from Russia competing as neutral athletes due to the state-sponsored doping scandal.
ROC	ROC from the abbreviation for Russian Olympic Committee	2020–2022	Used for Russian Olympic Committee athletes at the 2020 Summer Olympics and 2022 Winter Olympics following the sanctions due to the state-sponsored doping scandal. The delegation used a flag depicting the logo of the Russian Olympic Committee.
XXB	Mixed team	1896–1904	Used in the IOC's medal database to identify medals won by mixed teams of athletes from multiple nations (such as the combination of France and Great Britain), a situation that happened several times in the Games of 1896, 1900, and 1904. Until 2021, the IOC used the code ZZX for mixed teams. (Note: ZZX is visible in the page HTML for the mixed team's flag.) In 2021, the code was changed to MIX, matching the code for mixed teams at the Youth Olympics. In 2024, the code was changed to XXB.

== Special codes for Paralympics ==
Code	Nation/Team	Years	Notes
IPP	Independent Paralympic Participants	1992	Used for Independent Paralympic Participants at the 1992 Summer Paralympics as a designation used for athletes from FR Yugoslavia and Former Yugoslavian Republic of Macedonia who could not compete as a team due to United Nations sanctions.
IPA	Individual Paralympic Athletes	2000	De facto independent East Timor was not yet recognised as a sovereign state, and did not have a recognised National Paralympic Committee. Two athletes from the country gained the opportunity to in the 2000 Summer Paralympics in Sydney, but they competed officially as Individual Paralympic Athletes, rather than as representatives of an NPC.
IPA	Independent Paralympic Athletes	2016	A team consisting of refugee and asylee Paralympic athletes competed at the 2016 Summer Paralympics in Rio de Janeiro as Independent Paralympic Athletes.
NPA	Neutral Paralympic Athletes	2018; 2024	Used in 2018 for Russian athletes competing as neutral athletes due to the state-sponsored doping scandal. Was to be used in 2022 for Russian athletes competing as neutral athletes due to the Russian invasion of Ukraine, however the Russian athletes were ultimately banned before the start of the 2022 Games. Used again in the 2024 Summer Paralympics for both Russian and Belarusian athletes. In 2024, the designation was banned from using the Paralympic flag and instead used a white flag with black letters displaying "NPA" (but still used the Paralympic Anthem).
PNA	Paralympic Neutral Athletes	–	Was to be used for Belarusian athletes competing as neutral athletes due to the 2022 Russian invasion of Ukraine, however the Belarusian athletes were ultimately banned before the start of the 2022 Winter Paralympics and the code was not used.
RPC	RPC from the abbreviation for Russian Paralympic Committee	2020	Used for Russian Paralympic Committee athletes at the 2020 Summer Paralympics following the sanctions due to the state-sponsored doping scandal. The delegation used a flag with an altered emblem of the Russian Paralympic Committee (the original emblem being banned due to containing the flag of Russia). Was to be used in 2022 as well, however the Russian athletes were ultimately banned due to the 2022 Russian invasion of Ukraine.
RPT	Refugee Paralympic Team	2020; 2024	The team represents the estimated 82 million people around the world who are refugees, and the 12 million of which have disabilities per UNHCR estimate.

== Special codes for World Games ==
The World Games are a multi-sport event comprising sports and sporting disciplines that are not contested in the Olympic Games. The World Games are governed by the International World Games Association, under the patronage of the International Olympic Committee.

Code	Nation/Team	Years	Notes
HNL	Haudenosaunee	2022	The Haudenosaunee (also known as the Iroquois), who invented the sport of lacrosse and which has spiritual significance to them, were initially denied a spot to compete at the 2022 World Games, despite the Haudenosaunee national team's placement at the 2018 World Lacrosse Championship, due to not having a recognized NOC and issues concerning other countries recognizing sovereignty; they were given a spot to compete after Ireland agreed to drop out of competition in a show of solidarity.

== See also ==
- Comparison of alphabetic country codes
- List of FIFA country codes
- Lists of National Olympic Committees by continental association:
  - Association of National Olympic Committees of Africa
  - European Olympic Committees
  - Oceania National Olympic Committees
  - Olympic Council of Asia
  - Pan American Sports Organization
- List of participating nations at the Summer Olympic Games
- List of participating nations at the Winter Olympic Games
- List of CGF country codes
- ISO 3166-1
