= 2026 European Sixes Lacrosse Championships =

International lacrosse sixes competition

Tournament details
- Host country: Spain
- Venue: 1 (in 1 host city)
- Dates: November 4–18, 2026
- Teams: M: 22; W: 18

Final positions
- Champions: M: Great Britain; W: Israel
- Runners-up: M: Ireland; W: Great Britain
- Third place: M: Italy; W: Czech Republic
- Fourth place: M: Germany; W: Germany

2026 European Sixes Lacrosse Championships was a men's and women's tournament for lacrosse sixes teams held from 2 to 18, November 2026 in Salou, Spain. The event is hosted by Spain Lacrosse for the European Lacrosse Federation.

The top five teams in both the men's and women's tournament qualified for the 2027 World Lacrosse Sixes Championships which in turn will be used to qualify teams for the 2028 Summer Olympics in Los Angeles.

== Participating teams ==
Men's
  - Austria
  - Croatia
  - Czech Republic
  - Finland
  - France
  - Germany
  - Great Britain
  - Greece
  - Hungary
  - Ireland
  - Israel
  - Italy
  - Latvia
  - Netherlands
  - Norway
  - Poland
  - Portugal
  - Spain (hosts)
  - Sweden
  - Switzerland
  - Turkey
  - Ukraine
Women's
  - Austria
  - Croatia
  - Czech Republic
  - Finland
  - France
  - Germany
  - Great Britain
  - Ireland
  - Israel
  - Italy
  - Latvia
  - Netherlands
  - Norway
  - Poland
  - Portugal
  - Spain (hosts)
  - Sweden
  - Switzerland

== Venue ==
Games were played at the Mediterranean Sports Hub.

Salou
Mediterranean Sports Hub
2026 European Sixes Lacrosse Championships (Spain)

== Results ==
=== Men's ===
==== Preliminary round ====
===== Group A =====
Pos	Team	Pld	W	L	GF	GA	GD	Qualification
1	Great Britain	4	4	0	79	32	+47	Quarterfinals
2	Poland	4	3	1	73	52	+21	Playoffs
3	Latvia	4	2	2	66	42	+24	Playoffs
4	Spain (H)	4	1	3	42	94	−52	13th–20th placement
5	Turkey	4	0	4	46	86	−40	Play-ins

Source: WL
(H) Hosts

===== Group B =====
Pos	Team	Pld	W	L	GF	GA	GD	Qualification
1	Germany	5	4	1	118	59	+59	Quarterfinals
2	Greece	5	4	1	101	69	+32	Playoffs
3	Switzerland	5	3	2	68	62	+6	Playoffs
4	Czech Republic	5	3	2	85	76	+9	13th–20th placement
5	Hungary	5	1	4	57	98	−41	Play-ins
6	Ukraine	5	0	5	49	114	−65	Play-ins

Source: WL

===== Group C =====
Pos	Team	Pld	W	L	GF	GA	GD	Qualification
1	Israel	5	5	0	119	41	+78	Quarterfinals
2	Ireland	5	4	1	117	47	+70	Playoffs
3	Austria	5	3	2	76	90	−14	Playoffs
4	France	5	2	3	55	83	−28	13th–20th placement
5	Norway	5	1	4	59	104	−45	13th–20th placement
6	Croatia	5	0	5	47	108	−61	Play-ins

Source: WL

===== Group D =====
Pos	Team	Pld	W	L	GF	GA	GD	Qualification
1	Netherlands	4	4	0	86	43	+43	Quarterfinals
2	Italy	4	3	1	87	42	+45	Playoffs
3	Sweden	4	2	2	53	72	−19	Playoffs
4	Portugal	4	1	3	46	71	−25	13th–20th placement
5	Finland	4	0	4	28	72	−44	13th–20th placement

Source: WL

==== Final round ====
===== 13th–22nd bracket =====
Winners of the play-offs advances to the 13th–20th bracket

Play-ins
A5	Turkey	11
B6	Ukraine	10
B5	Hungary	15
C6	Croatia	8

Twentyfirst place
B6	Ukraine	16
C6	Croatia	17

====== Play-ins ======
15 November 2026; 9:00	Turkey	11–10	Ukraine

Game reference

15 November 2026; 9:30	Hungary	15–8	Croatia

Game reference

====== Twentyfirst place ======
17 November 2026; 10:00	Ukraine	16–17	Croatia

Game reference

===== 13th–20th bracket =====
Placement (Seventeenth place)
17 November
C4	France	20
D4	Portugal	10
Placement (Nineteenth place)
17 November
D5	Finland	10
C5	Norway	17

Consolation (17th–20th)
16 November
C4	France	13
D5	Finland	5
16 November
C5	Norway	14
D4	Portugal	15

Placement (13th–20th)
15 November
C4	France	13
A5 (P1)	Turkey	17
15 November
A4	Spain	13
D5	Finland	11
15 November
B4	Czech Republic	25
C5	Norway	14
15 November
D4	Portugal	8
B5 (P2)	Hungary	15

Semifinals (13th–16th)
16 November
A5	Turkey	13
A4	Spain	15
16 November
B4	Czech Republic	16
B5	Hungary	15

Thirteenth place
17 November
A4	Spain	16
B4	Czech Republic	29
Fifteenth place
17 November
A5	Turkey	16
B5	Hungary	21

====== 13th–20th placement ======
15 November 2026; 14:00	France	13–17	Turkey

Game reference

15 November 2026; 14:30	Czech Republic	25–14	Norway

Game reference

15 November 2026; 15:30	Spain	13–11	Finland

Game reference

15 November 2026; 16:00	Portugal	8–15	Hungary

Game reference

====== Semifinals (13th–16th) ======
16 November 2026; 14:00	Turkey	13–15	Spain

Game reference

16 November 2026; 15:30	Czech Republic	16–15	Hungary

Game reference

====== 17th–20th placement ======
16 November 2026; 10:30	Norway	14–15	Portugal

Game reference

16 November 2026; 12:30	France	13–5	Finland

Game reference

====== Nineteenth place match ======
17 November 2026; 10:30	Norway	17–10	Finland

Game reference

====== Seventeenth place match ======
17 November 2026; 12:00	Portugal	10–20	France

Game reference

====== Fifteenth place match ======
17 November 2026; 12:30	Turkey	16–21	Hungary

Game reference

====== Thirteenth place match ======
17 November 2026; 13:30	Spain	16–29	Czech Republic

Game reference

===== Playoffs (9th–12th) =====
Winners of the play-offs advances to the quarterfinals

Play-ins
A2	Poland	17
D3	Sweden	9
B2	Greece	26
C3	Austria	15
C2	Ireland	24
B3	Switzerland	6
D2	Italy	25
A3	Latvia	9

9th-12th places
D3	Sweden	12
C3	Austria	13
B3	Switzerland	8
A3	Latvia	18

Ninth place
C3	Austria	13
B3	Latvia	26
Eleventh place
D3	Sweden	16
A3	Switzerland	15

====== Playoffs ======
15 November 2026; 10:30	Italy	25–9	Latvia

Game reference

15 November 2026; 11:00	Poland	17–9	Sweden

Game reference

15 November 2026; 12:30	Ireland	24–6	Switzerland

Game reference

15 November 2026; 13:00	Greece	26–15	Austria

Game reference

====== 9th-12th places ======
16 November 2026; 9:00	Sweden	12–13	Austria

Game reference

16 November 2026; 9:30	Latvia	18–8	Switzerland

Game reference

====== Eleventh place match ======
18 November 2026; 10:00	Sweden	16–15	Latvia

Game reference

====== Ninth place match ======
18 November 2026; 10:30	Austria	13–26	Latvia

Game reference

===== 1st–8th bracket =====
Placement (Fifth place)
18 November
C1	Israel	19
D1	Netherlands	11
Placement (Seventh place)
18 November
B2	Greece	19
A2	Poland	18

Consolation (5th–8th)
17 November
B2	Greece	12
C1	Israel	14
17 November
A2	Poland	14
D1	Netherlands	19

Quarterfinals
16 November
A1	Great Britain	24
B2 (P4)	Greece	14
16 November
C1	Israel	10
D2 (P1)	Italy	13
16 November
B1	Germany	18
A2 (P2)	Poland	17
16 November
D1	Netherlands	15
C2 (P3)	Ireland	19

Semifinals
17 November
A1	Great Britain	16
D2	Italy	14
17 November
B1	Germany	21
C2	Ireland	25

Final
18 November
A1	Great Britain	21
C2	Ireland	14
Bronze medal game
D2	Italy	18
B1	Germany	14

====== Quarterfinals ======
16 November 2026; 11:00	Germany	18–17	Poland

Game reference

16 November 2026; 13:00	Great Britain	24–14	Greece

Game reference

16 November 2026; 14:30	Netherlands	15–19	Ireland

Game reference

16 November 2026; 16:00	Israel	16:00	Italy

====== Semifinals ======
17 November 2026; 15:00	Germany	21–25	Ireland

Game reference

17 November 2026; 16:30	Great Britain	16–14	Italy

Game reference

====== 5th–8th placement ======
17 November 2026; 14:00	Poland	14–19	Netherlands

Game reference

17 November 2026; 15:30	Greece	12–14	Israel

Game reference

====== Seventh place match ======
18 November 2026; 11:30	Poland	18–19	Greece

Game reference

====== Fifth place match ======
18 November 2026; 12:00	Netherlands	11–19	Israel

Game reference

====== Bronze medal match ======
18 November 2026; 13:30	Germany	14–18	Italy

Game reference

====== Gold medal match ======
18 November 2026; 15:00	Ireland	14–21	Great Britain

Game reference

=== Women's ===
==== Preliminary round ====
===== Group A =====
Pos	Team	Pld	W	L	GF	GA	GD	Qualification
1	Israel	4	4	0	123	17	+106	Quarterfinals
2	Poland	4	3	1	54	51	+3	Quarterfinals
3	Latvia	4	2	2	52	58	−6	9th–16th places
4	France	4	1	3	36	73	−37	9th–16th places
5	Portugal	4	0	4	26	92	−66	17th place game

Source: WL

===== Group B =====
Pos	Team	Pld	W	L	GF	GA	GD	Qualification
1	Italy	4	4	0	59	22	+37	Quarterfinals
2	Ireland	4	3	1	55	24	+31	Quarterfinals
3	Sweden	4	2	2	46	40	+6	9th–16th places
4	Switzerland	4	1	3	32	49	−17	9th–16th places
5	Finland	4	0	4	16	73	−57	17th place game

Source: WL

===== Group C =====
Pos	Team	Pld	W	L	GF	GA	GD	Qualification
1	Czech Republic	3	3	0	59	11	+48	Quarterfinals
2	Germany	3	2	1	52	18	+34	Quarterfinals
3	Croatia	3	1	2	21	59	−38	9th–16th places
4	Spain (H)	3	0	3	15	59	−44	9th–16th places

Source: WL
(H) Hosts

===== Group D =====
Pos	Team	Pld	W	L	GF	GA	GD	Qualification
1	Great Britain	3	3	0	74	8	+66	Quarterfinals
2	Netherlands	3	2	1	34	31	+3	Quarterfinals
3	Norway	3	1	2	19	39	−20	9th–16th places
4	Austria	3	0	3	5	54	−49	9th–16th places

Source: WL

==== Final round ====
===== Seventeenth place match =====
8 November 2026; 12:30	Portugal	12–11	Finland

Game reference

===== 9th–16th bracket =====
Thirteenth place
8 November
D4	Austria	7
D3	Norway	10
Fifteenth place
8 November
C3	Croatia	6
C4	Spain	15

Consolation
7 November
D4	Austria	12
C3	Croatia	10
7 November
C4	Spain	1
D3	Norway	17

Quarterfinals
6 November
A3	Latvia	15
D4	Austria	4
6 November
C3	Croatia	6
B4	Switzerland	14
6 November
B3	Sweden	12
C4	Spain	4
6 November
D3	Norway	13
A4	France	18

Semifinals
7 November
A3	Latvia	13
B4	Switzerland	6
7 November
B3	Sweden	16
A4	France	11

Ninth place
8 November
A3	Latvia	13
B3	Sweden	8
Eleventh place
8 November
B4	Switzerland	11
A4	France	6

====== Quarterfinals ======
6 November 2026; 13:00	Sweden	12–4	Spain

Game reference

6 November 2026; 15:00	Latvia	15–4	Austria

Game reference

6 November 2026; 16:30	Norway	13–18	France

Game reference

6 November 2026; 18:00	Croatia	6–14	Switzerland

Game reference

====== Semifinals (9th–12th) ======
7 November 2026; 11:30	Latvia	13–6	Switzerland

Game reference

7 November 2026; 15:00	Sweden	16–11	France

Game reference

====== 13th–16th placement ======
7 November 2026; 10:00	Austria	12–10	Croatia

Game reference

7 November 2026; 13:30	Spain	1–17	Norway

Game reference

====== Fifteenth place match ======
8 November 2026; 12:00	Croatia	6–15	Spain

Game reference

====== Thirteenth place match ======
8 November 2026; 14:00	Austria	7–10	Norway

Game reference

====== Eleveth place match ======
8 November 2026; 14:30	Switzerland	14–6	France

Game reference

====== Ninth place match ======
8 November 2026; 16:00	Latvia	13–8	Sweden

Game reference

===== 1st–8th bracket =====
Placement (Fifth place)
9 November
B2	Ireland	10
B1	Italy	21
Placement (Seventh place)
8 November
D2	Netherlands	13
A2	Poland	11

Consolation (5th–8th)
7 November
D2	Netherlands	8
B2	Ireland	11
7 November
B1	Italy	20
A2	Poland	10

Quarterfinals
6 November
A1	Israel	22
D2	Netherlands	7
6 November
C1	Czech Republic	11
B2	Ireland	3
6 November
B1	Italy	10
C2	Germany	14
6 November
D1	Great Britain	33
A2	Poland	4

Semifinals
7 November
A1	Israel	15
C1	Czech Republic	14
7 November
C2	Germany	2
D1	Great Britain	15

Final
9 November
A1	Israel	11
D1	Great Britain	10
Bronze medal game
9 November
C1	Czech Republic	10
C2	Germany	7

====== Quarterfinals ======
6 November 2026; 11:00	Israel	22–7	Netherlands

Game reference

6 November 2026; 12:30	Italy	10–14	Germany

Game reference

6 November 2026; 14:30	Great Britain	23–4	Poland

Game reference

6 November 2026; 16:00	Czech Republic	11–3	Ireland

Game reference

====== Semifinals ======
7 November 2026; 11:00	Israel	15–14	Czech Republic

Game reference

7 November 2026; 14:30	Germany	2–15	Great Britain

Game reference

====== 5th–8th placement ======
7 November 2026; 9:30	Netherlands	8–11	Ireland

Game reference

7 November 2026; 13:00	Italy	20–10	Poland

Game reference

====== Seventh place match ======
8 November 2026; 16:30	Netherlands	13–11	Poland

Game reference

====== Fifth place match ======
9 November 2026; 11:00	Ireland	10–21	Italy

Game reference

====== Bronze medal match ======
9 November 2026; 12:30	Czech Republic	10–7	Germany

Game reference

====== Gold medal match ======
9 November 2026; 14:00	Israel	11–10	Great Britain

Game reference

== Final standings ==
=== Men ===
Rank	Team m	Qualification
1st place, gold medalist(s)	Great Britain	2027 World Championships
2nd place, silver medalist(s)	Ireland	2027 World Championships
3rd place, bronze medalist(s)	Italy	2027 World Championships
4	Germany	2027 World Championships
5	Israel	2027 World Championships
6	Netherlands	
7	Greece	
8	Poland	
9	Latvia	
10	Austria	
11	Sweden	
12	Switzerland	
13	Czech Republic	
14	Spain	
15	Hungary	
16	Turkey	
17	France	
18	Portugal	
19	Norway	
20	Finland	
21	Croatia	
22	Ukraine	

=== Women ===
Rank	Team m	Qualification
1st place, gold medalist(s)	Israel	2027 World Championships
2nd place, silver medalist(s)	Great Britain	2027 World Championships
3rd place, bronze medalist(s)	Czech Republic	2027 World Championships
4	Germany	2027 World Championships
5	Italy	2027 World Championships
6	Ireland	
7	Netherlands	
8	Poland	
9	Latvia	
10	Sweden	
11	Switzerland	
12	France	
13	Norway	
14	Austria	
15	Spain	
16	Croatia	
17	Portugal	
18	Finland	

== All-tournament team ==
=== Men ===
William Baxter, (United Kingdom)

Nicolas DeCaprio, (United Kingdom)

David Disque, (Italy)

Conor Foley, (Republic of Ireland)

Ryan Hunns, (United Kingdom)

Eric Malever, (Israel)
