= University of Cincinnati Bearcat Bands =

Collegiate athletic bands program

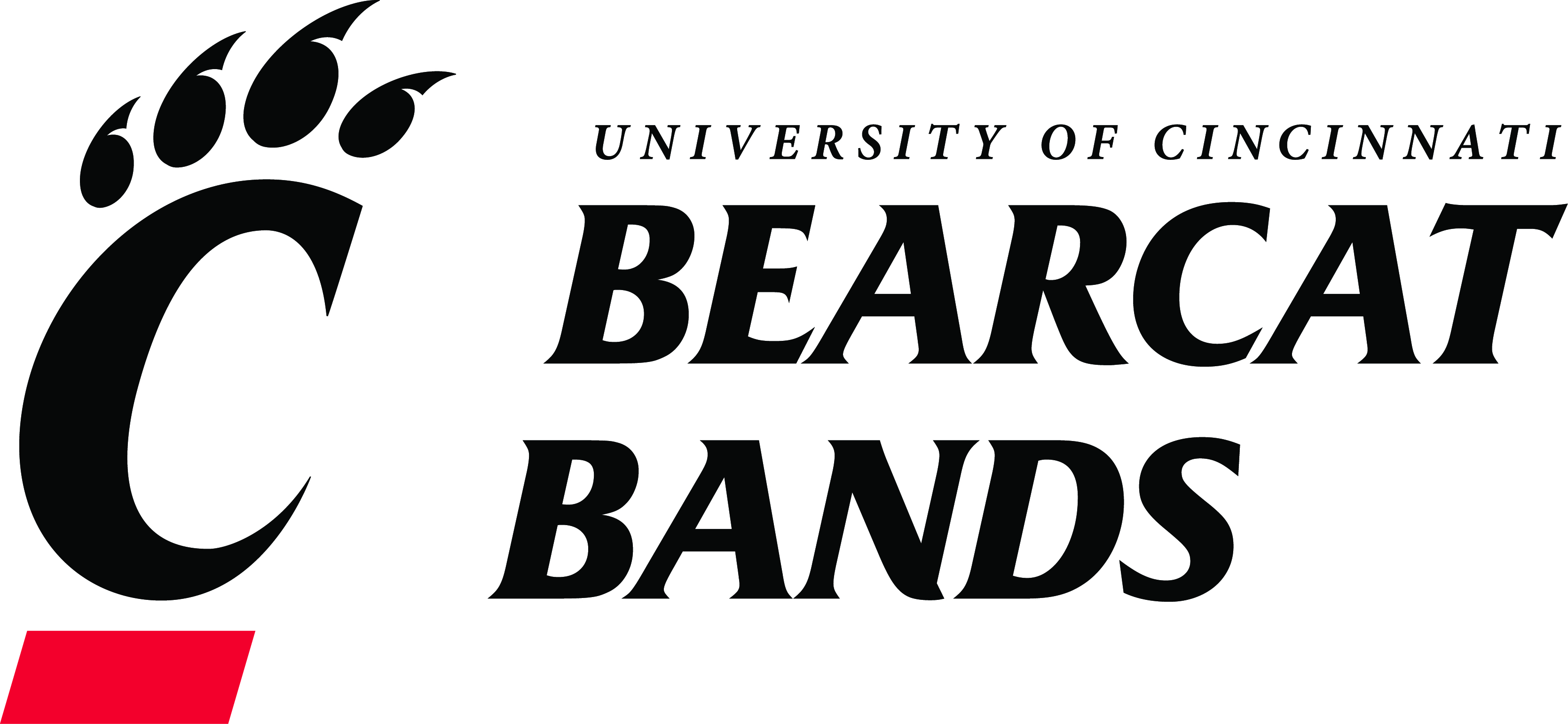
- School: University of Cincinnati
- Location: Cincinnati, Ohio
- Conference: Big 12
- Founded: 1920
- Director: Christopher Nichter
- Assistant Director: Andrea Meyer
- Members: 270
- Fight song: "Cheer Cincinnati"
- Website: https://www.uc.edu/campus-life/bearcat-bands.html

The University of Cincinnati Bearcat Bands is a comprehensive band program distinct and separate from the College-Conservatory of Music. Consisting of multiple ensembles beyond its Spirit Band, the program is housed under the Division of Student Affairs.

The program is also frequently referred to as "TUCBIDG" (pronounced tuck-bidge) in reference to its motto: "The UC Band is Damn Good." Recently, the program celebrated its centennial as well as its 80th year of women involvement in the band program.

Participation is open to all students enrolled at the University of Cincinnati including its branch campuses at Blue Ash and Clermont, as well as all students enrolled in an institution part of the Greater Cincinnati Collegiate Connection (GC3)

== Ensembles ==
The Bearcat Bands consists of multiple ensembles including its Spirit Band program (Marching and Basketball Bands), Concert and Jazz Ensembles in both the Fall and Spring Semesters, as well as a various brass, woodwind, and percussion ensembles. The Bearcat Bands also boasts visual ensembles in Spring Semester. All the ensembles combine for about 130 public performances each year, or about one every three days. Entrance into these ensembles are generally revolved around placement auditions.

=== Bearcat Spirit: Marching and basketball bands ===
The Bearcat Spirit Bands are the largest and most visible of the ensembles found within the program.

==== Bearcat Marching Band ====
The Bearcat Marching Band has historically boasted approximately 270 members. This ensemble is most active in the Fall Semester during football season, where they perform at every home game at the Historic Nippert Stadium with the possibility of travel for away games and/or bowl contention. It is also common for the ensemble to perform exhibitions in other settings, such as high school band competitions. The Bearcat Marching Band begins preparation before the start of the school year with a pre-season camp, kicking off the season on its last day with a Preview Performance.

==== Basketball Band ====
At the start of the basketball season, members of the Bearcat Spirit Bands also perform at men's and women's basketball games in Fifth Third Arena. Basketball bands are usually composed of approximately 30-50 individuals of both a visual and musical variety. This ensemble is present in both the Fall and Spring Semesters with an opportunity for students to sign up for "Winter Band" as the games continue throughout the university's winter break. These basketball bands have also been known to travel to Big 12 or NCAA tournament games as well as a nearby away game, on occasion. It is generally expected that members of the basketball bands have also participated in the Bearcat Marching Band, but situational exceptions have been granted by the band's directorship.

==== "Gig bands" ====
It is common for the Bearcat Bands to receive many requests to perform from various groups both internal and external from the University of Cincinnati. It is then possible for the Bearcat Bands to create "gig bands," where members sign up to attend and perform at these requested events. Size may vary depending on the demand and realistic capabilities. Common gigs have included the Cincinnati Reds Opening Day Parade, the Cincinnati Bearcats Spring Football Game, and much more such as ribbon cuttings, pep rallies, etc.

=== Concert bands ===
In addition to its Spirit Bands, the Bearcat Bands boasts a Fall Concert Band, a Spring Concert Band, and a Spring Wind Ensemble. Of the three concert bands, the Spring Winter Ensemble acts as the program's premier group, consisting of the most outstanding wind and percussion musicians on campus, committed to high standards of musical excellence. The program's Fall Concert Band is a half semester long and usually has two performances: one for the UC Veterans Day Ceremony and one for its winter holiday concert. In the Spring Semester, the Wind Ensemble usually has two performances: one in February and then one at the end of the school year where its counterpart, the Concert Band, joins along.

=== Jazz bands ===
The Bearcat Bands offers a Fall Jazz Band and a Spring Jazz Band. These ensembles adopt a big band style and are dedicated to the development of fine music. While pursuing contemporary and traditional pieces, these ensembles also dive deeper into combo music that represent different styles and periods. Both groups have end-of-semester performances and concerts, but always open themselves up to additional performance opportunities throughout the school year.

=== Visual Ensembles ===
In addition to a strong musical presence, the Bearcat Bands also holds a strong visual ensemble. In the Fall Semester, the Bearcat Spirit Bands display a colour guard and feature twirlers. Many of these individuals go on into the Spring Semester to pursue Bearcat Winter Guard. In this ensemble, individuals previously not familiar with the visual arts may still participate and learn such skills they have to offer. This group has the opportunity to perform at selected pregames and halftimes at men's and/or women's basketball games.

== Instrumentation ==
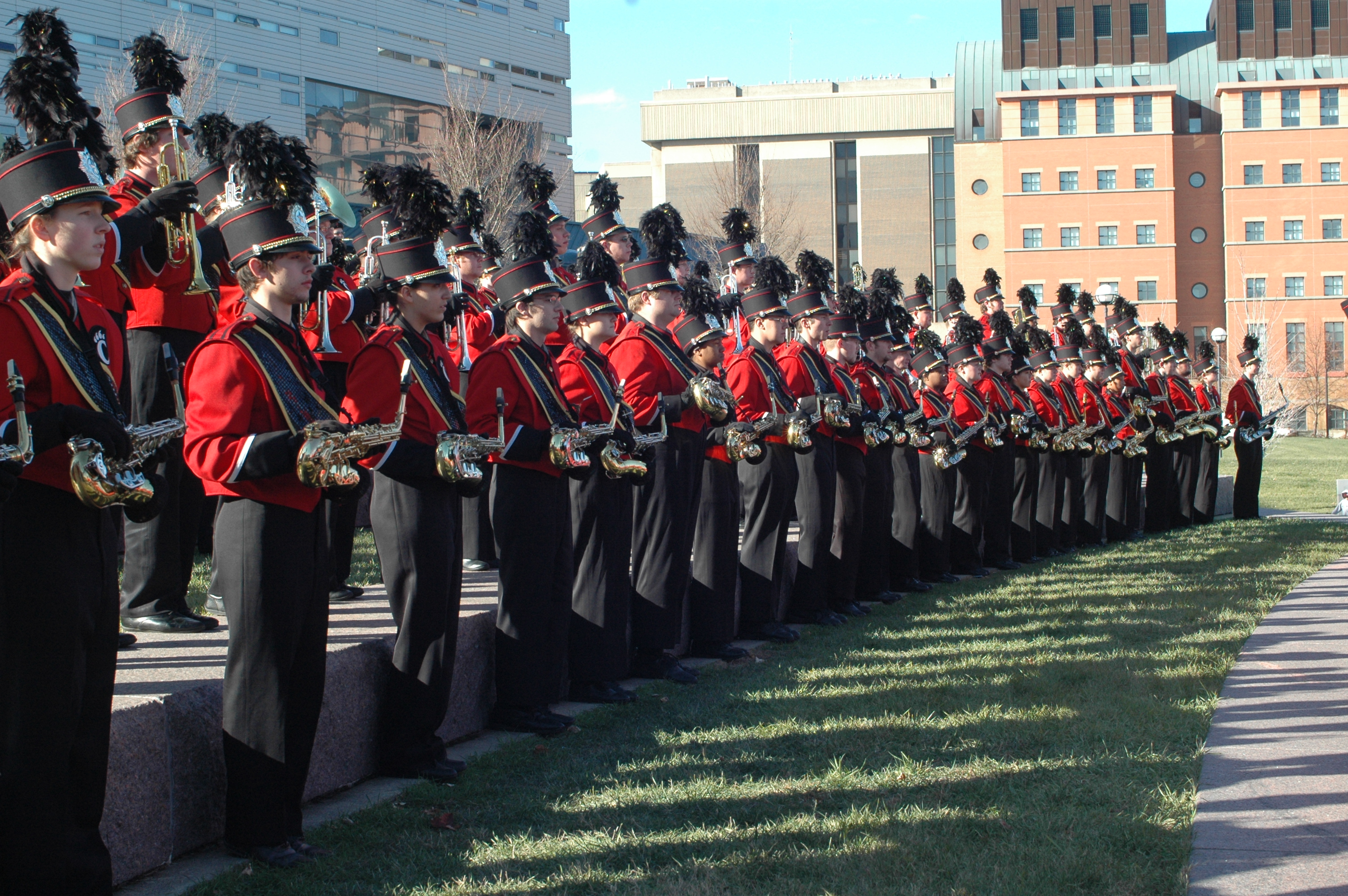
Pre-game performance at Sigma Sigma Commons

The Marching Band usually consists of these numbers. The Pep Bands for Men's Basketball and Women's Basketball games are divided into fourths.

The Flute/Piccolo section consists of approximately 16 members.

The Clarinet section consists of approximately 25 members.

The Saxophone section consists of approximately 36 members.

The Trumpet section consists of approximately 46 members.

The Horn/Mellophone section consists of approximately 16 members.

The Trombone section consists of approximately 22 members.

The Baritone section consists of approximately 8 members.

The Tuba section consists of approximately 14 members.

The Percussion section consists of approximately 10 Snares, 7 Tenor Drums, 7 varying size Bass Drums, 14 Cymbals, and 14 in the Front Ensemble.

The Color Guard consists of approximately 35 members.

There are 3 Feature Twirlers.

There are 3-4 Drum Majors.

== Performance style ==
The marching band uses the roll step and glide step when performing. The marching snare section uses Traditional Grip while playing. The Bearcat Marching Band is known for its contemporary approach to both music and drill design. Over 250 UC students come together to form the band's membership. This includes the all instrumentalists, the Bearcat Guard, Twirlers, and Drum Majors corps.

== Organization ==
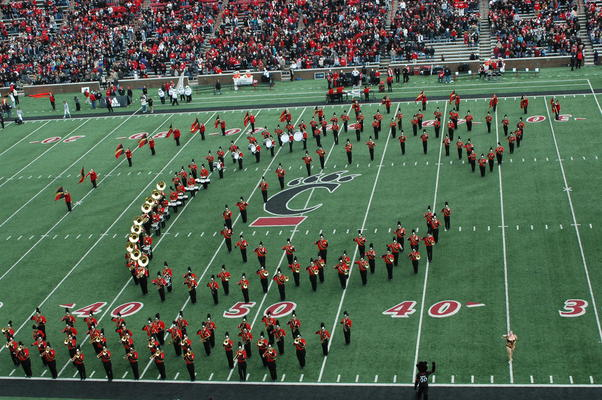
The UC Bearcat Band forms a C-Paw during their pre-game show.

The Bearcat Bands currently holds two-full time directors and a full-time program manager. The Head Director is Mr. Christopher J. Nichter (since 2017). The assistant director is Ms. Andrea L. Meyer (since 2022). The Program Manager is Ms. Alicja Lipsky (since 2022).

=== Student leadership ===
==== Student Band Council ====
Since 1923, the Bearcat Bands houses a Student Band Council, which is composed of members from all ensembles in the program. Being enrolled and involved in one of these ensembles automatically entitles students to full membership privileges. The Student Band Council, beyond the general membership, holds a Senate and an Executive Council. The Executive Council holds the President, the Vice President of Involvement, the Vice President of Experience, the Treasurer, the Internal Communications Coordinator, and the Historian. While historically taking on many roles throughout its century-long existence, the organization has adopted a support stance solely revolved around social experiences for the general member.

== History ==
=== The Beginning: An ROTC band (1920-1929) ===
In the fall of 1920, Mr. Ralph A. Van Wye, a student in the College of Engineering, had just returned to the University of Cincinnati after a tour of duty in the US Army during World War I as an army bandsman. At the time, ROTC was compulsory for all male students at the University of Cincinnati. Since Mr. Van Wye had just completed two years of army service, he did not feel obligated to continue as a member of ROTC on campus, requesting to have his requirement waived. However, when the commandant saw that he was an army bandsman, he told Mr. Van Wye that he was just the man they needed. They wanted to organize an ROTC band, but had no one available to serve as bandmaster. Rather than being excused from ROTC, Mr. Van Wye was appointed as bandmaster to the first University of Cincinnati ROTC band. That fall Mr. Ralph A. Van Wye held his first rehearsal in one of the laboratories in the College of Engineering. Eight members were in attendance. Looking back on the group, Mr. Van Wye humorously remarked, "The only letter we could form was the letter I". Mr. Van Wye continued as band director until his graduation in the spring of 1923. In September 1923, Sergeant Victor Norling transferred from Ft. Thomas, Kentucky to the ROTC detachment at the University of Cincinnati as the second band director. He remained in this position until 1929. Throughout these first nine years, the UC Band was an ROTC band, administered by the ROTC unit. In addition to performing at all ROTC functions, it also presented halftime shows at UC football games. At the Nippert Stadium Dedication Day game between Oberlin College and UC on November 8, 1924, the band made its first appearance in uniforms. In 1925, the bandsmen initiated the idea of the coed band sponsor, and in the same year elected Julia E. Sale their first band sponsor. Candidates from local sororities would be nominated for the band sponsor, who would then be selected each year at the band’s annual Fall banquet. This single female bandmember would provide a social “in” to the world of dating for the all-male band. During Sgt. Norling's tenure as director, the UC Band also began making trips with the team to some of the away football games.

=== The transitioning years: A student group (1929-1942) ===
In 1929 Colonel R. A. Aderegg, Assistant Dean of the College of Engineering, was appointed faculty advisor to the band. In the fall of 1929, Merrill B. Van Pelt assumed the position of director of the UC Band. At this point the band shifted from an ROTC band to a student activity for all male students on campus. Up to this point, all membership had been from the College of Engineering. Mr. Van Pelt looked to change this and began recruiting students from other colleges. Among his recruiting efforts was the development of the "Varsity Vanities", a musical review sponsored by the UC Band in which students from all colleges and groups participated. During the 1930s the UC Band gained a national reputation at football games. Mr. Van Pelt and the UC Band were one of the first to use animated formations and dance steps in football halftime shows. The band also traveled extensive ly during these years.

=== World War II: Incorporation of bandswomen (1942-1949) ===
The rise of World War II put an end to football games after the fall season of 1942. While the band stopped marching, it did not stop playing. Combined concerts with the Conservatory Symphonic Band were held, while the band also played for all formal military functions and War Band Rallies. Throughout the first twenty-three years of its existence, the membership of the band was only men. However Due to the recruitment needs of World War II, only two bandsmen were left on campus from previous years by the fall of 1944. At this time, the UC Band began accepting women for membership on a temporary basis. For the remainder of World War II, membership in the band was predominantly female. Then with the close of World War II in 1945, football games resumed and the UC Band returned to perform on the football field, both men and women. The return of older band members in 1946 though created tension within the UC Band. Many of the returning men felt that the band should revert to its all male status. Their case eventually lost, and the band officially became coed. The 1946–1947 school year was highlighted by a trip to the Sun Bowl in El Paso, Texas, as the UC Football Team made its first appearance in a major bowl game. In the spring of 1947, Mr. Van Pelt submitted his resignation in order to devote full-time to his responsibilities as Supervisor of Instrumental Music in the Cincinnati Public Schools. The search for a new director brought Mr. Clarence E. Mills to the UC Band as its fourth overall director and first full-time director. Mr. Mills had recently been released from the Army where he had served as an Army bandmaster during World War II. He served as director from 1947 to 1949, completely reorganizing and branching the band into a precise, intricate marching Bearcat Band, two pep bands and an intramural band. Varsity Vanities continued, along with a Band Clinic that proved successful for area high school bands. It was during this period that the concert band began its development. In 1949 Mr. Mills left the University of Cincinnati in order to return to the Army as Special Services Officer.

=== The expansion years: The Bearcat Bands (1949-1970) ===
Mr. Robert Hamilton served as director of the band from 1949 until the spring of 1954, when he left to take a position in California. Mr. Hamilton introduced the "story-telling maneuver", adding a new dimension to halftime entertainment. In the spring of 1954, Dr. Roy Robert Hornyak became the sixth director of the UC Band. That fall he introduced the famed CHARGE down the stadium steps, and in 1955 he established the Bearkittens drill team. Due to the increased scope of the activities of the band, 1955 also saw the name of the organization changed to the plural: The University of Cincinnati Bearcat Bands. The UC Band's first Band Camp convened in the fall of 1958. Later that same year, the band was spotlighted on national television as they performed at Chicago's Wrigley Field for a Chicago Bears game. In 1959 the Bearcat Varsity Band joined the Concert Band and the Marching Band as one of the three basic units within the band organization. In 1964, a Stage Band program was initiated and quickly grew under the leadership of Mr. John Defoor, a former arranger for the UC Bands. In 1968 the Brass Band was discontinued and absorbed by the CCM Symphonic Band. The University Band program was incorporated into the College Conservatory of Music around this time as well. Due to increasing demands upon his ti me from other CCM obligations, Dr. Hornyak completed his tenure as director of the UC Bands in the spring of 1970.

=== The seventies: Searching for stability (1970-1979) ===
In September 1970, Dr. Robert Wojciak became the seventh director of the UC Bands. The band saw many national appearances through performing at Cincinnati Reds and Bengal games. In 1972, Harry McTerry took over as director of the UC Bands and focused on improving the driving marching and playing style of the UC Marching Band. The UC Band also performed at the 1972 National League Play-offs and World Series. In 1973, Prof. Woodrow Hodges became the ninth director of the UC Bands. During his tenure the band saw much travel with trips to Philadelphia, Disney World, Athens, Georgia, and Louisville. The band was met with great enthusiasm with each trip and received praise for its outstanding performances. The UC Marching Band also performed at the 1975 National League Play-offs and World Series, the 1976 World Series and a Monday Night Football for the Cincinnati Bengals. During Mr. Hodges tenure more emphasis was placed on the basketball Varsity Band. Under the leadership of "Woody", the UC Band was well known for its high-stepping marching style, original music arrangements, and powerful sound. After four action packed years, Mr. Hodges left to take a position in Wisconsin. The fall of 1977 marked the arrival of the tenth UC Marching Band director, Prof. Glenn Richter, former assistant director of the University of Texas Longhorn Band. Mr. Richter introduced the "show band" techniques of the southern marching bands, and created the UC Band Flag Corps, incorporating a new color and dimension to the band's performances. After two years with the UC Band, Mr. Richter headed further north to accept a position as director of the University of Michigan marching band.

=== Into the modern era: The return of the CHARGE (1979-1994) ===
Dr. Terence G. Milligan, former director of the Northwest Missouri State University Bands, became the eleventh Director of Bands at UC in 1979. During "Doc's" time, the band went through a style change to the glide step that is currently used. In the fall of 1981, Dr. Milligan introduced the Rifle Line to complete the UC Color Guard. Dr. Milligan also reintroduced the tradition of charging down the stadium steps during pre-game that had been lost over the years. In the winter of 1986, students in the band organized the "Varsity Clown Band", which entertained the crowds at basketball games throughout the season. Although popular with the crowd, the Clown Band was disbanded after only two years of performance. In 1987 Mr. Eugene Corporon took the position as Director of Wind Studies at CCM. His new position at UC included responsibility for the Bearcat Bands, and so in the fall of 1988 he instituted "Campus Band". This new band was designed as a year-round concert band open to all students, faculty, and employees at the University of Cincinnati. Due to changes in the athletic department and the introduction of a new University Dance Team, the Bearkittens were disbanded in the fall of 1989. In 1993, the Bearcat Bands were dropped from CCM funding and for a brief period, the band found itself completely independent of any university sponsorship. Mr. Matthew McInturf, a CCM graduate student, was hired as the interim director of the UC Bands. In the spring of that year, the band was officially transferred from CCM to the Athletic Department. The band also went to an off campus location for band camp, the first time since it was moved on campus by Dr. Milligan. Student members in the band were very excited with the leadership change and off-site band camp, which created a much improved marching band for the 1993 season.

=== A new era: The modern band (1994–present) ===
In the fall of 1994, the beginning of the marching season brought Dr. Terren Frenz Sr. to the UC Band as the thirteenth director. Under the baton of Dr. Frenz, several changes helped the UC Band evolve into a much more effective unit. The leadership of the band was transferred from the students of band council, who had been running the band in recent years, to Dr. Frenz. The 1990s were a time of great improvement in the image of the UC Band. New uniforms, provided by the university administration, gave the Band a much-needed face-lift. These new contemporary style uniforms debuted at the Humanitarian Bowl in Boise, Idaho in 1997. This trip marked the first bowl trip for the Bearcats since the Sun Bowl in 1956. However, bowl trips would become almost a regular occurrence at the turn of the century as the football team continued to improve. The year 1999 led to many innovations, including the first appearance of the UC Band at a professional football game in recent history when the Bengals celebrated their last game in Riverfront Stadium. Dr. Frenz would continue this relationship with the Bengals for many years to come. Also in 1999, the band welcomed assistant director Mr. David Martin, who would serve the band for over a decade. The same year, the Bearcat Bands was incorporated as its own independent department under the Office of Student Life. In the Spring of 2000, the band was finally presented with a new, "temporary" facility in Armory Fieldhouse. This marked the first real home for the Bearcat Bands in almost 25 years and replaced its previous lodgings in the basement of Laurence Hall. The band would remain there until March 29, 2005, when the Rockwern Band Center was officially dedicated on May 26, 2005. The university hired an additional assistant band director, Mr. Nick Angelis (Assistant Band Director 2005–2016, Associate Band Director 2017–2024), bringing the staff to three full-time directors. The continued success of the basketball and football teams led to increased exposure for the band all throughout the first decade of the new millennium. Through this exposure and the development of the UC Bands as a whole, membership peaked at over 250 members in 2010. The same year, assistant director David Martin retired after many years of hard work and dedication to the UC Bearcat Bands. His retirement gave way to new assistant band director Dr. Jody Besse graduate from the University of Southern Mississippi. On May 3, 2017. the university announced Mr. Christopher Nichter (assistant director for The Pride of West Virginia) as the new band director, replacing Dr. Besse who served as interim director for the last five months.

The program continued to grow to just over 270 members in the 2019 season, with operations ceasing in 2020 due to the outbreak of the COVID-19 pandemic. Despite various hardships, the program still operated in 2020, standing still on the campus’s baseball field and playing songs in a format dubbed by the directors as LOPE (Large Outdoor Performing Ensemble), until eventually the band was allowed to perform at football games. This consisted of a spaced-apart seating arrangement in the stands, with each game-day only containing a third of the band’s population who would rotate through football games.

The 2021 iteration of the Bearcat Bands is celebrated as one of the most widely viewed ensembles in its history. The 2021 University of Cincinnati Football Team achieved an unprecedented 13-0 regular season record and became the first Group of 5 team to reach the College Football Playoff. This success helped propel the Bearcat Bands further into the national spotlight, performing before an audience of over 340,000 and making their first ever appearance on ESPN's College Gameday. Their journey culminated in an appearance at the Cotton Bowl in Dallas, Texas, where they participated in the "Battle of the Bands". The Bearcat Bands also performed John William's "Swing Swing Swing" at the bowl's halftime.

The Bearcat Bands' acclaim travelled to the Fenway Bowl in Boston, Massachusetts in 2022. In 2024, the Future University of Egypt would fund an opportunity for a Pep Band to travel to Cairo to perform several times on the campus of FUE, as well as to meet with students to share college experiences, and tour various museums. Before the 2024 season, Mr. Nick Angelis was let go as the band's Associate Band Director.

In order, the 14 band directors of the UC Bearcat Bands:

- 1920 - 1923: Mr. Ralph Van Wye
- 1923 - 1929: Sgt. Victor Norling
- 1929 - 1947: Mr. Merrill B. Van Pelt
- 1947 - 1949: Mr. Clarence E. Mills
- 1949 - 1954: Mr. Robert Hamilton
- 1954 - 1970: Dr. Roy Robert Hornyak
- 1970 - 1972: Dr. Robert Wojciak
- 1972 - 1973: Mr. Harry McTerry
- 1973 - 1977: Prof. Woodrow Hodges
- 1977 - 1979: Prof. Glenn Richter
- 1979 - 1993: Dr. Terence G. Milligan
- 1993 - 1994: Mr. Matthew McInturf
- 1994–2016: Dr. Terren L. Frenz Sr.
- 2017: Dr. Jody Besse (Interim)
- 2017–Present: Mr. Christopher Nichter

== School songs ==
- "Army Fanfare" - played at UC home games before the CHARGE Down the Stadium Steps
- "Cheer Cincinnati"- the fight song of the University of Cincinnati
- "Red and Black"
- "Give A Cheer"
- "The University of Cincinnati Alma Mater"
- "Down The Drive" - the UC Drum Line's signature cadence and the University's most popular gameday cheer
- "Paw" - cadence played by the UC Drum Line while exiting the stadium, written by associate director of Bands Nick Angelis (2005–2024)
- "Five-Second Cheer/Dr. Who Hey Song" - a combination of the fanfare of "Cheer Cincinnati" and the "Hey Song"
