= United States women's national lacrosse sixes team =

United States
- Association: USA Lacrosse
- Confederation: PALA (Americas)
- Head coach: Lindsey Munday

First international
- United States 14–17 Canada (October 23, 2021; Sparks, United States)
Medal record
World Games
Gold medal – first place	2025 Chengdu	Team
Silver medal – second place	2022 Birmingham	Team
Pan-American Championship
Gold medal – first place	2026 Oshawa	Team

The United States women's national lacrosse sixes team represents the United States internationally in lacrosse tournaments. They compete in lacrosse sixes, the form of lacrosse which will feature in the 2028 Summer Olympics, rather than the full field format. It is sanctioned by USA Lacrosse.

== History ==
In November 2018, the United States fielded a team and played an exhibition matches against United Women's Lacrosse League and the Women's Professional Lacrosse League featuring a new six-a-side variant of the sport that would become known as the "lacrosse sixes" that will be played in the 2028 Summer Olympics. Lacrosse was included in the Olympics in 2021.

USA Lacrosse held its first ever training event for its lacrosse sixes national program in July 2021. The United States women's national lacrosse sixes later played at the World Lacrosse Super Sixes in October 2021.Their first officially sanctioned event was the 2022 World Games in Birmingham where they finished as silver medalists.

In 2024, Lindsey Munday was named as head coach, leading the United States to a gold medal finish at the 2025 World Games in Chengdu.

The United States will participate at the Pan-American Sixes Lacrosse Championship. They are also expected to represent the host country, at the 2028 Olympics in Los Angeles.

== Team records ==
=== Olympic Games ===
Olympic Games record
Year	Result	Matches	Wins	Draws	Losses	PF	PA	Coach
(United States) 2028	Qualified as hosts							
Total	0/1							

=== World Games ===
World Games record
Year	Result	Matches	Wins	Draws	Losses	PF	PA	Coach
(United States) 2022	Silver medal	5	4	0	1	90	41	
(China) 2025	Gold medal	5	5	0	0	129	50	Lindsey Munday
Total	2/2	10	9	0	1	219	91	—

- Lacrosse is conducted in the standard field lacrosse format at the 2017 World Games

=== Pan-American Championship ===
Pan-American Sixes Lacrosse Championship record
Year	Result	Matches	Wins	Draws	Losses	PF	PA	Coach
(Canada) 2026	Champions	4	4	0	0	120	35	Lindsey Munday
Total	1/1	4	4	0	0	120	35	—

== Head coaches ==
- (United States) Lindsey Munday (2024–present)
