= Australia women's national lacrosse sixes team =

Australia
- Association: Lacrosse Australia
- Confederation: APLU (Asia-Pacific)
- Head coach: Katrina Dowd
Medal record
World Games
Bronze medal – third place	2025 Chengdu	Team
Bronze medal – third place	2022 Birmingham	Team

The Australia women's national lacrosse sixes team represents Australia internationally in lacrosse tournaments. They compete in lacrosse sixes, the form of lacrosse which will feature in the 2028 Summer Olympics, rather than the full field format. It is organized by Lacrosse Australia.

== History ==
Australia made its World Games women's lacrosse debut in the 2022 edition in Birmingham finished as bronze medalist.

Katrina Dowd was appointed head coach in May 2025. At the 2025 World Games in Chengdu in August, Australia defeated Japan in overtime to win the bronze medal. In October 2025, Australia won a silver medal at the Super Sixes tournament in Oshawa, Canada.

In January 2026, Lacrosse Australia retained Dowd as coach and also established a developmental squad to complement the main sixes team.
