= Sparks, Maryland =

Unincorporated community in Maryland, United States

- Unincorporated community
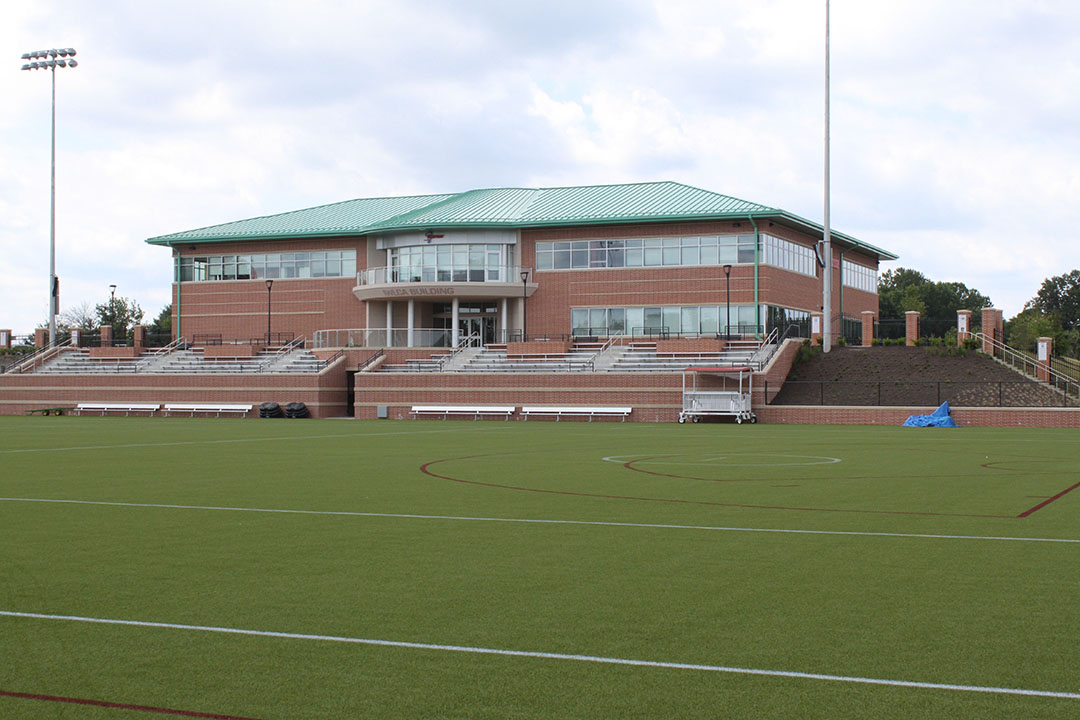
- US Lacrosse headquarters in Sparks, MD

- Location within the State of Maryland Sparks, Maryland (the United States)
- Coordinates: 39°31′51″N 76°38′45″W
- Country: United States
- State: Maryland
- County: Baltimore
- Time zone: UTC-5 (Eastern (EST))
  - Summer (DST): UTC-4 (EDT)
- ZIP code: 21152

Sparks is an unincorporated community that is located in Baltimore County, Maryland, United States. It is situated approximately 20 miles (32 km) north of Baltimore and is considered to be a suburb of the City of Baltimore. The Gunpowder River runs through Sparks.

The popular North Central Railroad ("NCR") Hike-Bike Trail runs through Sparks along the basin of the Gunpowder Falls (a.k.a. the Gunpowder River). The town's ZIP Code is 21152 and it is frequently accessed at Exit 24, Belfast Road, along Interstate 83, a Highway that runs from Baltimore to Harrisburg, Pennsylvania. Although Sparks is unincorporated and has no official town limits, the area that is usually considered to constitute Sparks runs from several miles west of I-83 to Carroll Road to the east, and from north of Hunt Valley/Cockeysville along York Road and I-83 to Hereford. According to the 2010 US Census, 5,094 people live in the Sparks area. Glencoe is a smaller community that is largely surrounded by Sparks and the area is sometimes collectively known as "Sparks Glencoe, Maryland".

== History ==
=== 1800s ===
In 1835, the Baltimore and Susquehanna Railroad constructed a track through Baltimore County which included a siding and switch near a large tract of land owned by the Sparks family. Railroad officials gave the name Sparks to the switch, and soon area residents began to refer to the location as "Sparks' Switch." Abraham Lincoln's body was carried through Sparks on the Baltimore and Susquehanna Railroad from Washington, D.C., on its way to burial in Illinois following his assassination in 1865.

For a number of years a creamery was operated for farmers who brought their milk in daily to be separated. (The stone structure which once housed the creamery can be seen today.) The cream was shipped to Baltimore while the skim milk was used by the farmers on their farms. With the passage of time, Sparks' Switch came to be known simply as "Sparks." In 1888, the area had grown to a point where "a substantial foot bridge 6 feet in width" had to be built across the Gunpowder River.

Beginning in 1889, a combination passenger and freight station was operated by the Northern Central Railway (NCR) along the right-of-way and line that had previously been known as the Baltimore and Susquehanna Railroad. A passenger and freight stop along the North Central Railroad was named Sparks Station. Railroad operations through Sparks ceased in 1972, as a direct result of major damage to the tracks and rail bed that occurred during flooding that followed Hurricane Agnes.

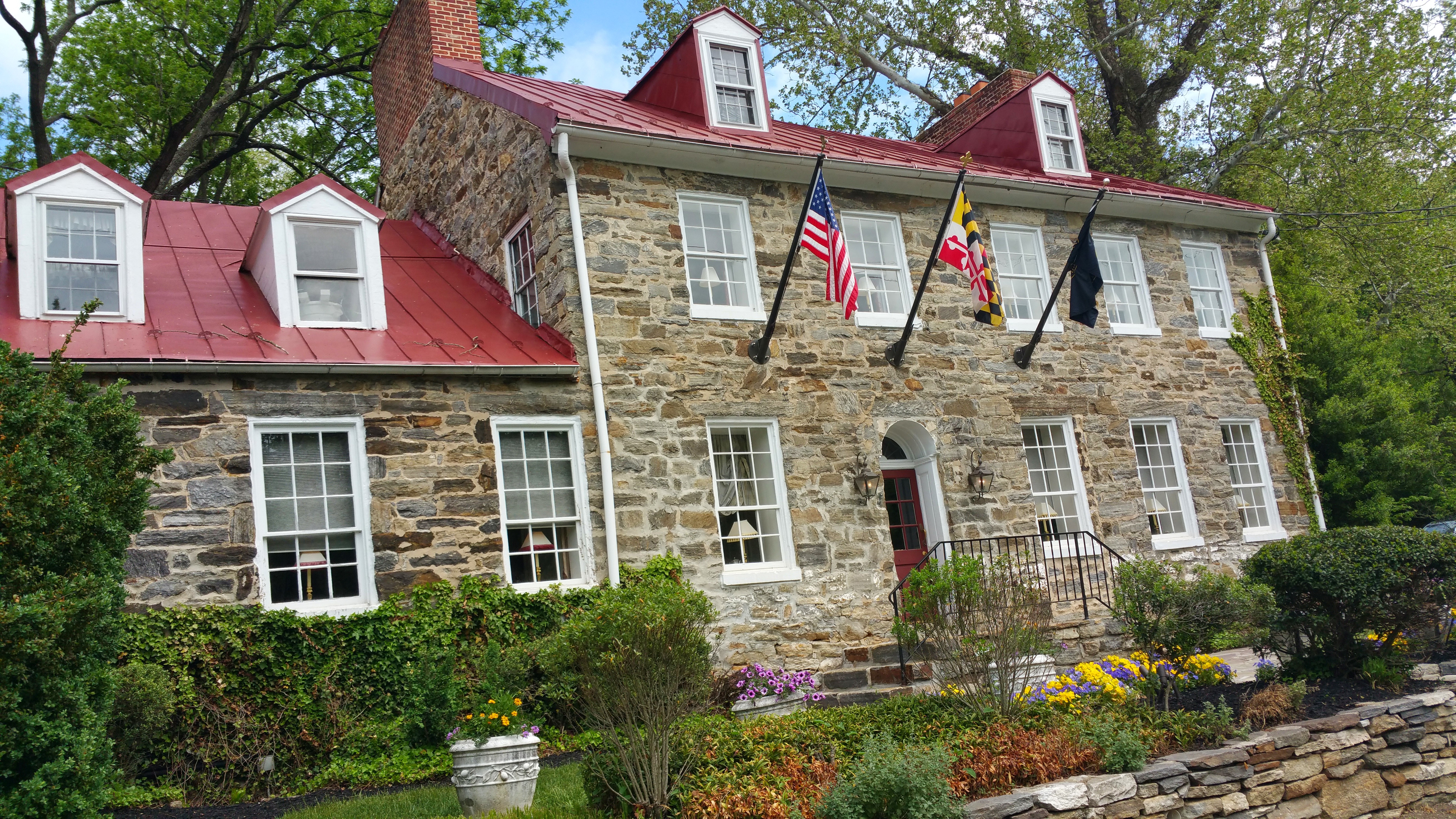
Milton Inn

The section along York Road that is today known as Sparks was previously named Philopolis. (The name "Philopolis" is from the Greek and means "Love Town." Today, a subdivision of Sparks is named "Loveton Farms."). The original town of Sparks, as distinguished from Philopolis, was merely a cluster of homes and farms one mile to the east along the NCR tracks and Sparks Road. Philopolis was the site of the Milton Academy, a well known private day and boarding school for boys. Of note is the fact that one of the school's students was John Wilkes Booth. The Milton Academy stands today along York Road in Sparks and serves as one of the region's finest restaurants, the Milton Inn. Wallace Warfield Simpson, better known as the Duchess of Windsor, and the Princess of Jordan, graduated from the nearby Oldfields School, a private boarding school for young women. Also located in the area that was originally known as Sparks (along Sparks Road) was a blacksmith and a wheelwright shop, an undertaker, a milliner, and a general store. In time, the entire area came to be known as Sparks and the village of Philopolis disappeared from county maps.

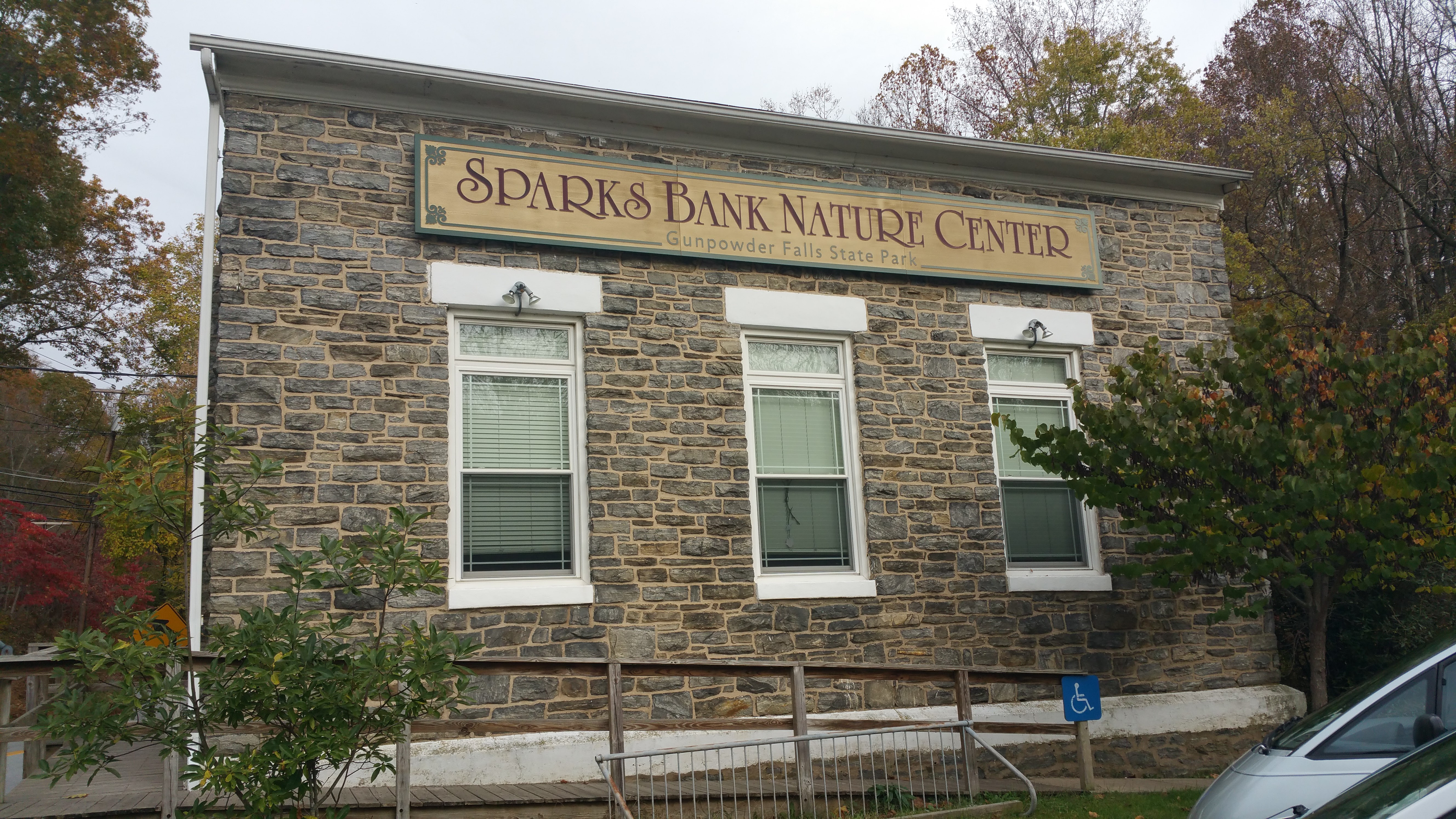
Sparks State Bank building

=== 1900s ===
In 1909, six small rural schools were consolidated into what is known today as the once-historic Sparks Elementary School building on Sparks Road.

Sparks State Bank was built in 1916 next to the store along the NCR tracks. Both the bank and the post office have since been moved back to York Road, which now serves as the main area of local business. The bank moved in 1954 due to a decrease in train activity as well as repeated flooding from the Gunpowder River; some of the bank's safe deposit boxes were said to have contained water from past floods. The original Sparks Bank building still stands and is now operated as a Nature Center for young children by volunteers of Gunpowder Falls State Park in conjunction with the NCR Hike and Bike Trail, which follows the old railroad path through northern Baltimore County. In 1913, a general store and warehouse was built and the post office was moved from York Road to Sparks Road.

==== Sparks Elementary School fire ====
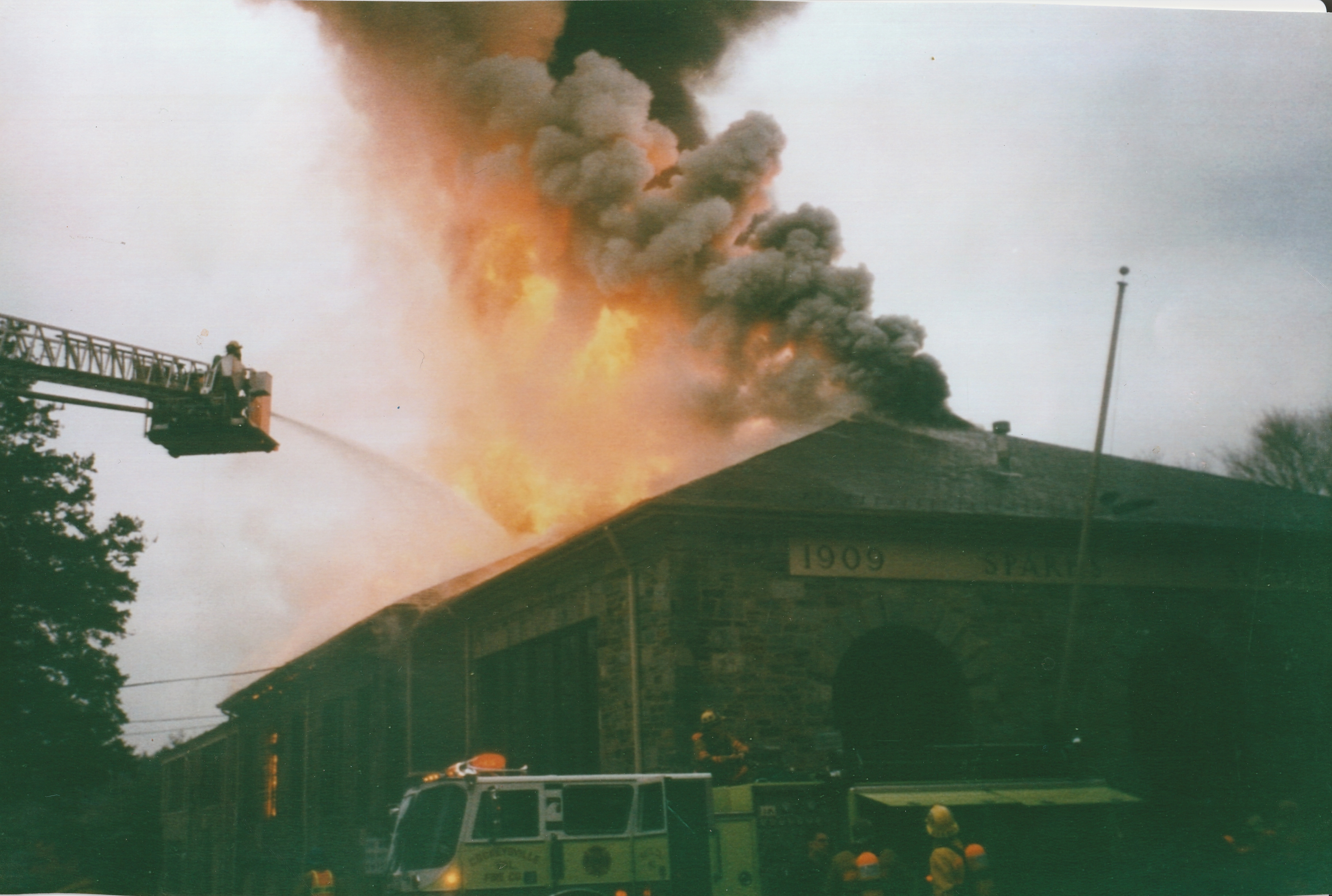
Sparks Elementary School Fire (January 8, 1995)

Sparks Elementary School was completely gutted by an electrical fire on the morning of January 8, 1995.

Although remnants of the stone foundation and outer face of the building still remain, the once-historic stone building was clearly unsuitable to be used again for its original purpose. Returning students who were slated to continue classes at Sparks Elementary School from winter-spring of 1995 were instead transferred to a makeshift Elementary School wing set up within Cockeysville Middle School in Cockeysville, Maryland. Incoming students who were slated to begin kindergarten classes at Sparks Elementary School in the fall of 1995 were instead transferred to a makeshift kindergarten wing of Bosley Church in Sparks, on Thornton Mill Road, Maryland. In 1998, Sparks Elementary School was rebuilt on Belfast Road, approximately one mile west of its original location on Sparks Road. This new incarnation of Sparks Elementary School opened on November 23, 1998.

== Economy ==
Sparks, and in particular the Loveton business area, is the home of a growing economic presence. From 1995 until 2011, it was the headquarters of sportwear manufacturer FILA USA. KELLY, an employee benefits and payroll services provider with 500 employees moved to the former Fila headquarters in Sparks in June, 2015. Acclaimed video game development studio Firaxis Games also moved to the town in 2009. McCormick & Company, a Fortune 1000 company that manufactures spices, herbs, and flavorings for retail, commercial, and industrial markets, was headquartered in Sparks until late 2018. US Lacrosse moved its headquarters to Sparks in 2016. Apex Tool Group is based in Sparks.
