= Lacrosse at the 2025 World Games =

- Venue: Chengdu No. 7 High School Eastern Campus Athletics Field
- Dates: 7–10 August 2025
- Competitors: 8 teams from 8 nations

The lacrosse competition at the 2025 World Games only consisted of a women's tournament and was held at the Chengdu No. 7 High School Eastern Campus Athletics Field in Chengdu, China.

The games in 2025, like in 2022, was played in the sixes format, with teams of six players per side, reduced field size, and shorter games as compared to the parent field lacrosse format, which was conducive to daily tournament play.

== Qualification ==
A total of eight women's teams competed in the lacrosse event at the 2025 World Games.

Qualification	Hosts	Date(s)	Spot(s)	Qualifier(s)
Host nation	—	—	1	China
2022 World Games	(United States) Birmingham	12–16 July	4	Canada; United States; Australia; Great Britain
2025 Asia-Pacific Women’s Lacrosse Championship	(Australia) Sunshine Coast	6–11 January	1	Japan
2025 EuroLax Sixes Cup	(Portugal) Algarve	3–8 March	2	Ireland; Czech Republic

== Medalists ==
Event	Gold	Silver	Bronze
Women's tournament	United States; Chloe Humphrey; Sam Apuzzo; Marie McCool; Cassidy Weeks; Charlotte North; Ally Mastroianni; Kenzie Kent; Izzy Scane; Ally Kennedy; Taylor Moreno; Shea Dolce; Ellie Masera	Canada; Lauren Black; Aurora Cordingley; Brooklyn Walker-Welch; Kylea Dobson; Erica Evans; Annabel Child; Bianca Chevarie; Lauren Spence; Maddy Baxter; Dylana Williams; Nicole Perroni; Jordan Dean	Australia; Stephanie Kelly; Rebecca Lane; Abby Thorne; Hannah Nielsen; Addie Cunningham; Olivia Parker; Theo Kwas; Ocea Leavy; Ashtyn Hiron; Georgia Latch; Mim Suares-Jury; Bonnie Yu

== Results ==
=== Preliminary round ===
==== Group A ====
Pos	Team	Pld	W	L	GF	GA	GD	Qualification
1	Canada	3	3	0	59	15	+44	Advance to Semifinals
2	Japan	3	2	1	38	33	+5	Advance to Semifinals
3	Great Britain	3	1	2	44	31	+13	Advance to 5th place game
4	China (H)	3	0	3	5	67	−62	Advance to 7th place game

Source: 2025 World Games
(H) Hosts

7 August 2025; 10:30	Canada	20–5	Japan	Chengdu No.7 Athl. Field, Chengdu

Game reference

7 August 2025; 14:30	China	2–24	Great Britain	Chengdu No.7 Athl. Field, Chengdu

Game reference

8 August 2025; 9:00	Great Britain	10–14	Canada	Chengdu No.7 Athl. Field, Chengdu

Game reference

8 August 2025; 13:00	Japan	18–3	China	Chengdu No.7 Athl. Field, Chengdu

Game reference

9 August 2025; 10:30	Canada	25–0	China	Chengdu No.7 Athl. Field, Chengdu

Game reference

9 August 2025; 14:30	Great Britain	10–15	Japan	Chengdu No.7 Athl. Field, Chengdu

Game reference

==== Group B ====
Pos	Team	Pld	W	L	GF	GA	GD	Qualification
1	United States	3	3	0	89	32	+57	Advance to Semifinals
2	Australia	3	2	1	54	42	+12	Advance to Semifinals
3	Czech Republic	3	1	2	34	65	−31	Advance to 5th place game
4	Ireland	3	0	3	28	66	−38	Advance to 7th place game

Source: 2025 World Games

7 August 2025; 9:00	United States	32–11	Ireland	Chengdu No.7 Athl. Field, Chengdu

Game reference

7 August 2025; 13:00	Czech Republic	10–23	Australia	Chengdu No.7 Athl. Field, Chengdu

Game reference

8 August 2025; 10:30	Australia	13–25	United States	Chengdu No.7 Athl. Field, Chengdu

Game reference

8 August 2025; 13:00	Ireland	10–16	Czech Republic	Chengdu No.7 Athl. Field, Chengdu

Game reference

9 August 2025; 9:00	United States	32–8	Czech Republic	Chengdu No.7 Athl. Field, Chengdu

Game reference

9 August 2025; 13:00	Australia	18–7	Ireland	Chengdu No.7 Athl. Field, Chengdu

Game reference

=== Consolation round ===
==== 7th place game ====
10 August 2025; 9:00	China	5–19	Ireland	Chengdu No.7 Athl. Field, Chengdu

Game reference

==== 5th place game ====
10 August 2025; 10:30	Great Britain	20–11	Czech Republic	Chengdu No.7 Athl. Field, Chengdu

Game reference

=== Final round ===
Semifinals
B1	United States	24
A2	Japan	10
A1	Canada	21
B2	Australia	4

Final
B1	United States	16
A1	Canada	8
Bronze medal game
A2	Japan	12
B2	Australia	13

==== Semifinals ====
10 August 2025; 13:00	Canada	21–4	Australia	Chengdu No.7 Athl. Field, Chengdu

Game reference

10 August 2025; 14:30	United States	24–10	Japan	Chengdu No.7 Athl. Field, Chengdu

Game reference

==== Bronze medal game ====
11 August 2025; 10:00	Australia	13–12	Japan	Chengdu No.7 Athl. Field, Chengdu

Game reference

==== Final ====
11 August 2025; 11:30	United States	16–8	Canada	Chengdu No.7 Athl. Field, Chengdu

Game reference

== Final standings ==
Rank	Team
1st place, gold medalist(s)	United States
2nd place, silver medalist(s)	Canada
3rd place, bronze medalist(s)	Australia
4	Japan
5	Great Britain
6	Czech Republic
7	Ireland
8	China

== Ranking ==
=== Women Lacrosse sixes ===
Rank	Team	M	W	D	L	GF	GA	GD
1	United States	5	5	0	0	129	50	+79
2	Canada	5	4	0	1	88	35	+53
3	Australia	5	3	0	2	69	75	−6
4	Japan	5	2	0	3	60	70	−10
5	Great Britain	4	2	0	2	64	42	+22
6	Czech Republic	4	1	0	3	45	85	−40
7	Ireland	4	1	0	3	47	71	−24
8	China	4	0	0	4	10	86	−76
