= Lacrosse at the 2022 World Games =

- Venue: PNC Field
- Dates: 12–16 July 2022 (women); 8–12 July 2022 (men)
- Competitors: from 9 nations

The lacrosse competition at the 2022 World Games took place in July 2022, in Birmingham in United States, at the University of Alabama Birmingham. Originally scheduled to take place in July 2021, the Games were rescheduled for July 2022 as a result of the 2020 Summer Olympics postponement due to the COVID-19 pandemic. The women's tournament was played as an official event. The men's tournament, at first designated an invitational event, was also added to the official programme. José Perurena, IWGA President, stated, "In Birmingham, for the first time, invitational sports were no longer presented separately but were also part of the official programme."

This was the first time that men's and women's field lacrosse were played in a six-a-side format in a multi-sport competition. This was also an absolute debut of a men's tournament in a World Games programme, as in 2017 women played the traditional lacrosse discipline for the first time in the history of the World Games. The games in 2022 were played in the sixes format, with teams of six players per side, reduced field size, and shorter games as compared to the parent field lacrosse format, which was conducive to daily tournament play. The game was played in eight-minute quarters and emphasized speed and efficiency.

== Qualification ==
A total of 8 teams for each gender competed in the lacrosse event at the 2022 World Games.

Qualification for the men's tournament of the 2022 World Games was based primarily on final placement at the 2018 World Lacrosse Championship. The Iroquois team, who took third at the 2018 championship, were initially disqualified as the Iroquois confederacy does not have a National Olympic Committee; after the ruling was overturned, the Irish team vacated their place in their favour. Lacrosse was invented by Indigenous nations including the Iroquois or Haudenosaunee peoples, and the game has spiritual significance for them.

For the women's tournament, the 2021 World Lacrosse Women's World Championship was supposed to be the basis for qualification. Like their men's counterpart, the Iroquois women's national lacrosse team was eligible to qualify. However, the Women's World Championship was postponed to July 2022.

=== Women's teams ===
- Australia
- Canada
- Czech Republic
- Great Britain
- Haudenosaunee
- Israel
- Japan
- United States

=== Men's teams ===
- Australia
- Canada
- Germany
- Great Britain
- Haudenosaunee
- Israel
- Japan
- United States

== Results ==
=== Medal table ===
* Host nation (United States)

Rank	Nation	Gold	Silver	Bronze	Total
1	Canada	2	0	0	2
2	United States*	0	2	0	2
3	Australia	0	0	1	1
3	Japan	0	0	1	1
Totals (4 entries)		2	2	2	6

=== Medalists ===
Event	Gold	Silver	Bronze
Men's tournament	Canada; Wesley Berg; Reid Bowering; Josh Byrne; Bryan Cole; Zach Currier; Brett Dobson; Jordan MacIntosh; Clarke Petterson; Drake Porter; Challen Rogers; Dhane Smith; Jeff Teat	United States; Martin Brandau; Liam Byrnes; Ryan Conrad; Adam Ghitelman; Zach Goodrich; Justin Guterding; Colin Heacock; Jack Kelly; Connor Kirst; Tom Schreiber; Brian Tevlin; Ryan Tierney	Japan; Yuki Fukushima; Hiroki Kanaya; Yuto Komatsu; Seiya Natsume; Kazuki Obana; Kiyoshi Sano; Dai Sato; Kinori Sugihara; Junichi Suzuki; Shinya Tateishi; Soya Tokumasu; Tomoki Umehara
Women's tournament	Canada; ~~Madalyn Baxter~~; Lauren Black; Emily Boissonneault; Annabel Child; Aurora Cordingley; Dana Dobbie; Erica Evans; Megan Kinna; Nicole Perroni; Lauren Spence; Lydia Sutton; Brooklyn Walker-Welch	United States; Madison Ahern; Kasey Choma; Marge Donovan; Madison Doucette; Haley Hicklen; Ellie Masera; Danielle Pavinelli; Paige Petty; Belle Smith; Sam Swart; Meaghan Tyrrell; Caitlyn Wurzburger	Australia; Tegan Brown; Addie Cunningham; Cassidy Doster; Theo Kwas; Bec Lane; Georgia Latch; Sarah Mollison; Olivia Parker; Sarah Smith; Abby Thorne; Indyah Williams; Bonnie Yu

=== Men's tournament ===
Group A

Pos	Team	Pld	W	L	GF	GA	GD	Qualification
1	United States (H)	3	3	0	63	29	+34	Advance to Semifinals
2	Great Britain	3	2	1	44	38	+6	Advance to Semifinals
3	Australia	3	1	2	45	40	+5	Advance to 5th place game
4	Germany	3	0	3	28	73	−45	Advance to 7th place game

Source: 2022 World Games
(H) Hosts

Group B

Pos	Team	Pld	W	L	GF	GA	GD	Qualification
1	Canada	3	3	0	73	26	+47	Advance to Semifinals
2	Japan	3	1	2	50	63	−13	Advance to Semifinals
3	Haudenosaunee	3	1	2	41	53	−12	Advance to 5th place game
4	Israel	3	1	2	40	62	−22	Advance to 7th place game

Source: 2022 World Games

Knockout stage

Seventh place game

July 11, 2022	Germany	16−11	Israel	Birmingham
10:30		Report		Stadium: PNC Field

Fifth place game

July 11, 2022	Australia	12−19	Haudenosaunee	Birmingham
12:00		Report		Stadium: PNC Field

Semifinals

July 11, 2022	United States	17−12	Japan	Birmingham
14:00		Report		Stadium: PNC Field

July 11, 2022	Great Britain	11−22	Canada	Birmingham
15:30		Report		Stadium: PNC Field

Bronze Medal Game

July 12, 2022	Japan	19−18 (OT)	Great Britain	Birmingham
19:00		Report		Stadium: PNC Field

Gold Medal Game

July 12, 2022	United States	9−23	Canada	Birmingham
19:00		Report		Stadium: PNC Field

=== Women's tournament ===
Group A

Pos	Team	Pld	W	L	GF	GA	GD	Qualification
1	United States (H)	3	3	0	57	22	+35	Advance to Semifinals
2	Australia	3	2	1	41	37	+4	Advance to Semifinals
3	Japan	3	1	2	33	32	+1	Advance to 5th place game
4	Czech Republic	3	0	3	24	64	−40	Advance to 7th place game

Source: World Games
(H) Hosts

Group B

Pos	Team	Pld	W	L	GF	GA	GD	Qualification
1	Canada	3	3	0	49	22	+27	Advance to Semifinals
2	Great Britain	3	2	1	34	38	−4	Advance to Semifinals
3	Israel	3	1	2	35	38	−3	Advance to 5th place game
4	Haudenosaunee	3	0	3	27	47	−20	Advance to 7th place game

Source: World Games

Knockout stage

Seventh place game

July 15, 2022	Czech Republic	8−13	Haudenosaunee	Birmingham
10:30		Report		Stadium: PNC Field

Fifth place game

July 15, 2022	Japan	12−13	Israel	Birmingham
12:00		Report		Stadium: PNC Field

Semifinals

July 15, 2022	United States	21−5	Great Britain	Birmingham
14:00		Report		Stadium: PNC Field

July 15, 2022	Australia	7−12	Canada	Birmingham
14:00		Report		Stadium: PNC Field

Bronze medal game

July 16, 2022	Great Britain	7−13	Australia	Birmingham
19:00		Report		Stadium: PNC Field

Gold medal game

July 16, 2022	United States	12−14	Canada	Birmingham
20:30		Report		Stadium: PNC Field
