= Lacrosse in the United States =

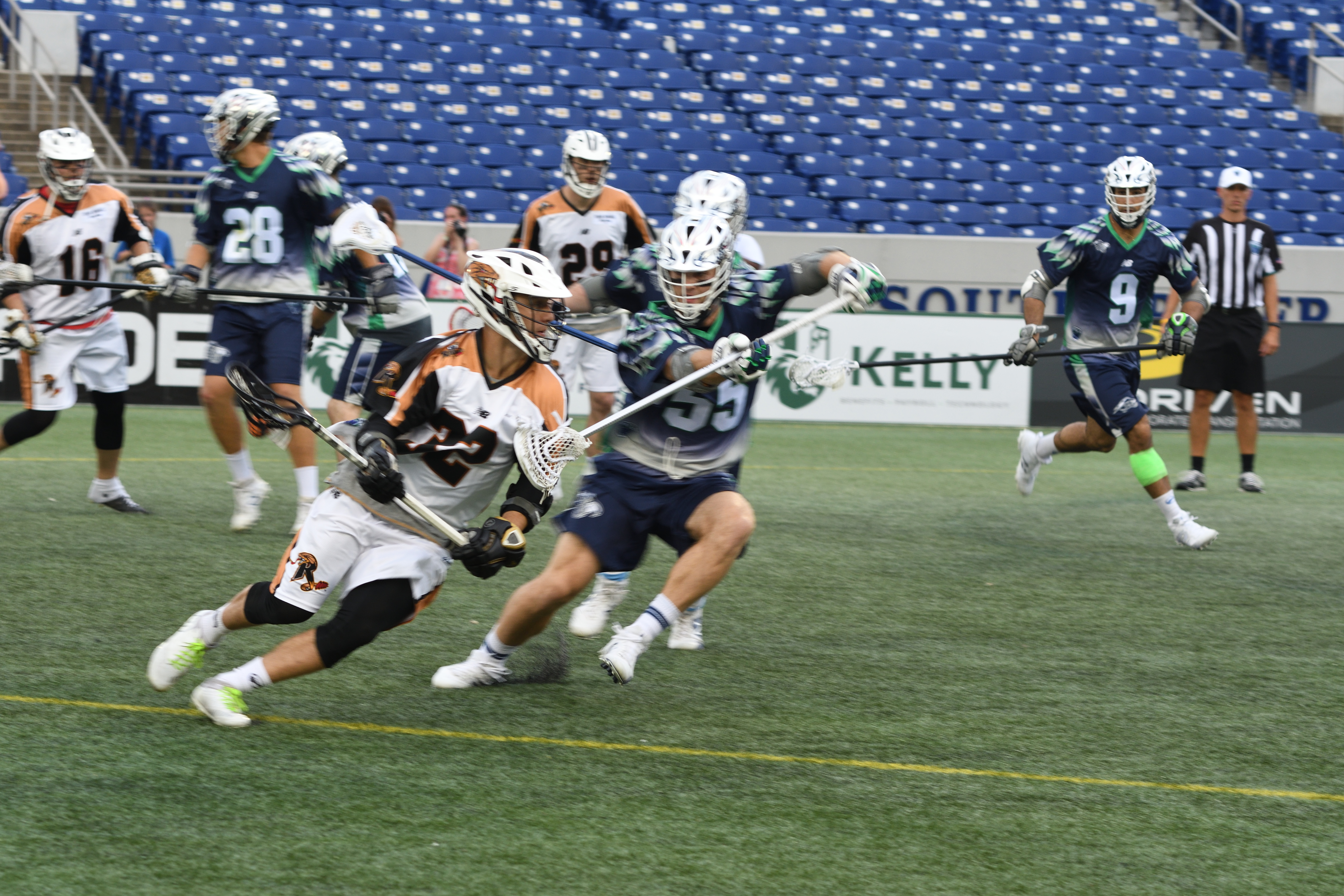
- Country: United States
- Governing body: US Lacrosse
- National teams: Men's national team Women's national team

National competitions
- Premier Lacrosse League; National Lacrosse League; United Women's Lacrosse League

International competitions
- World Lacrosse Championship; World Lacrosse Box Championships; Women's Lacrosse World Cup

Audience records
- Single match: 48,970 (2008)

The sport of lacrosse has been played in the United States by Native Americans long before European exploration. The sport is most popular in the northeast and mid-Atlantic areas of the country. However, the game has recently developed into a popular team sport for both men and women in all regions of the United States.

== U.S. national teams ==
Every year the United States puts together five teams to compete on an international level. There is also an men's indoor team, and four outdoor teams: men's, women's, men's under 19 and women's under 19. Since the beginning of the men's World Lacrosse Championship in 1967, the United States national teams have won a total of thirty world championships.

== Professional lacrosse ==
=== National Lacrosse League ===
The National Lacrosse League is the most popular lacrosse league drawing more than million attendees every year. The league is also the oldest lacrosse league still in operation with its first season in 1987. In contrast to the PLL and WLL its a box lacrosse league which operates from January to June. Because of these differing schedules, many current professional lacrosse players will start the year off in box lacrosse and end with outdoor lacrosse in the summer. Box lacrosse is a slightly different version of traditional lacrosse and is played in a dried-out hockey rink and also frequently includes bare knuckle fighting in contrast to field lacrosse. Goalies wear pads comparable to the pads an ice hockey player would traditionally wear. Games in box lacrosse also feature six players versus six instead of ten versus ten matchups in outdoor lacrosse. There are currently 14 teams in the National Lacrosse League. They are the Buffalo Bandits, Calgary Roughnecks, Colorado Mammoth, Georgia Swarm, Halifax Thunderbirds, Las Vegas Desert Dogs, Philadelphia Wings, Rochester Knighthawks, San Diego Seals, Saskatchewan Rush, Toronto Rock, Oshowa Firewolves, Ottowa Black Bears and Vancouver Warriors.

==== Attendances ====
The top 5 box lacrosse teams by average home league attendance (including Canadian Teams) in the 2025-2026 season:

#	Team	Average
1	Buffalo Bandits	18,290
2	Calgary Roughnecks	11,649
3	Halifax Thunderbirds	10,337
4	Vancouver Warriors	9690
5	Colorado Mammoth	9599

=== Premier Lacrosse League ===
In 2018, star lacrosse player Paul Rabil introduced a new league, called the Premier Lacrosse League. It is a joint venture with his brother, Mike. Three main contributors are The Chernin Group, Joe Tsai and The Raine Group. It consists of eight teams, Chaos Lacrosse Club, Chrome Lacrosse Club, Atlas Lacrosse Club, Whipsnakes Lacrosse Club, Redwoods Lacrosse Club, Waterdogs Lacrosse Club, Cannons Lacrosse Club and Archers Lacrosse Club. It currently has a deal with NBC Sports to broadcast the games. The league shortened the field by 10 yards, and introduced many other new rules in order to speed the game up. It also offered higher salaries than Major League Lacrosse, health-care, and a stake in the company. The league is using a tour based system, so the franchises aren't based in any cities. Its inaugural season was in 2019.

=== Major League Lacrosse ===
In 1998, Jake Steinfeld became inspired by an article that spoke about the growth of lacrosse, and wanted to develop a professional outdoor league. By 2001, the MLL or Major League Lacrosse had started play to capitalize on the growing demand of lacrosse both in the United States and around the world.

Major League Lacrosse is currently a six-team professional league with the bulk of the teams in the Northeastern United States. Many of these players are considered some of the best, if not the best, in the world. The current Major League Lacrosse teams include: Atlanta Blaze, Boston Cannons, New York Lizards, Chesapeake Bayhawks, Denver Outlaws, Dallas Rattlers, along with the Charlotte Hounds, who are on a hiatus. Unlike high school and college lacrosse, the MLL uses a two-point line on its field that sits sixteen yards from the front of the goal. They also have recently implemented a sixty-second shot clock which speeds up an already fast-paced game.

On December 16, 2020, the league announced that it would be merging with the Premier Lacrosse League.

==== Attendances ====
The top 5 field lacrosse teams from the United States by average home league attendance in the 2019 season:

#	Team	Average
1	Chesapeake Bayhawks	7,145
2	Denver Outlaws	5,812
3	New York Lizards	4,553
4	Dallas Rattlers	4,185
5	Boston Cannons	4,087

Source: League page on Wikipedia

=== United Women’s Lacrosse League ===
Starting in 2016, the United Women's Lacrosse League began play. Currently, the league's teams are located only on the northern east coast as these areas can draw the biggest fan bases. The teams involved in the league play are the Baltimore Ride, the Boston Storm, the Long Island Sound, and the Philadelphia Force. At the moment, players have their travel expenses paid for but do not receive a salary as the thirty to forty-thousand-dollar budget is currently used to keep the league running. By comparison, players in the MLL make somewhere between ten and twenty-five thousand dollars a year.

=== Women’s Professional Lacrosse League ===
The Women's Professional Lacrosse League (WPLL) is a women's lacrosse league in the United States. The league is composed of five teams: the Baltimore Brave, New England Command, New York Fight, Philadelphia Fire, and Upstate Pride. League play started on Saturday, June 2, 2018.

== Structure and function ==
Lacrosse is a full field, 10 vs 10 contact sport, unless in women’s there's 12 players. Four attackers, four defenders, three midfielders, and a goalie. Every men’s team has one goalie, three defenders, three mid fielders, and three attack-men. Throughout the contest, players attempt use their sticks to shoot the ball into the opponent's goal. At the end of the game, the team with the most goals wins. In college lacrosse, the games consist of four, fifteen minute quarters. This game length decreases to twelve minutes per quarter at the high school level, and decreases to ten minute per quarter at the little league level.

Each team must have five players (a goalie and four defenders typically), on their defensive side of the field at all times. They must also have four players (usually four attackmen) on their offensive side of the ball at all times. The remaining three players (usually midfielders or middies) are free to roam the field as they please during the game. There are twelve players on the field at a time. Still each team is allowed a maximum of seven players on their half of the field at a team and six players on their opponents’ side of the field at a time with the goalie being the extra man. Like hockey, substitutions are considered “on the fly” meaning that the players may enter and exit the field during gameplay assuming each team has a maximum of ten players on the field at the time. The game essentially has the same rules as hockey and is played both indoor (box lacrosse) and outdoor (full field).

== History ==
Lacrosse started out as a tribal ritual for Native Americans to play before going to war. Differences between groups may have been settled through large, multi-day games covering expansive fields and many players. The game was originally known as stickball. Ever since its creation, it has been considered a collision sport like football and hockey, not a contact sport like basketball and soccer. For a short amount of time, lacrosse was a full-fledged Olympic sport. After westward expansion, Europeans modified the game to make it much more alike the college and high school level game played today. When natives played lacrosse, dodging defenders was considered cowardly and was looked down upon. Since they were preparing for war, they were taught to embrace the pains involved with playing the game and fight through them. Throwing the ball from stick to stick was seen as a trick in the game, not a commonly utilized skill. Nowadays, these two trends have changed in a great way. Being able to skillfully pass from between teammates and dodge defenders to create open shots have become a pinnacle of today's current game.

== Growth ==
Lacrosse in the US is currently one of the fastest growing sports in America. With a faster growth rate than swimming, bowling, water polo, cross country, ice hockey, and soccer, there were 36,000 college lacrosse players in the United States as of 2015. From 2009 to 2014 the growth rate for lacrosse has been 28%. In 2009, 1,984 high schools across the country had sponsored a lacrosse program, but by 2014, 2,535 high schools across the country had sponsored a lacrosse program. Originally lacrosse was only played on the east coast, but it is starting to make a move out to the middle and west of the United States. 750,000 children across the United States played lacrosse in 2015. For junior league lacrosse, the growth rate has been 43% for boys and girls. Denver became the first non-east coast team in history to make it to the NCAA division 1 finals in 2015.
