= Gillette Stadium =

Stadium in Foxborough, Massachusetts, US

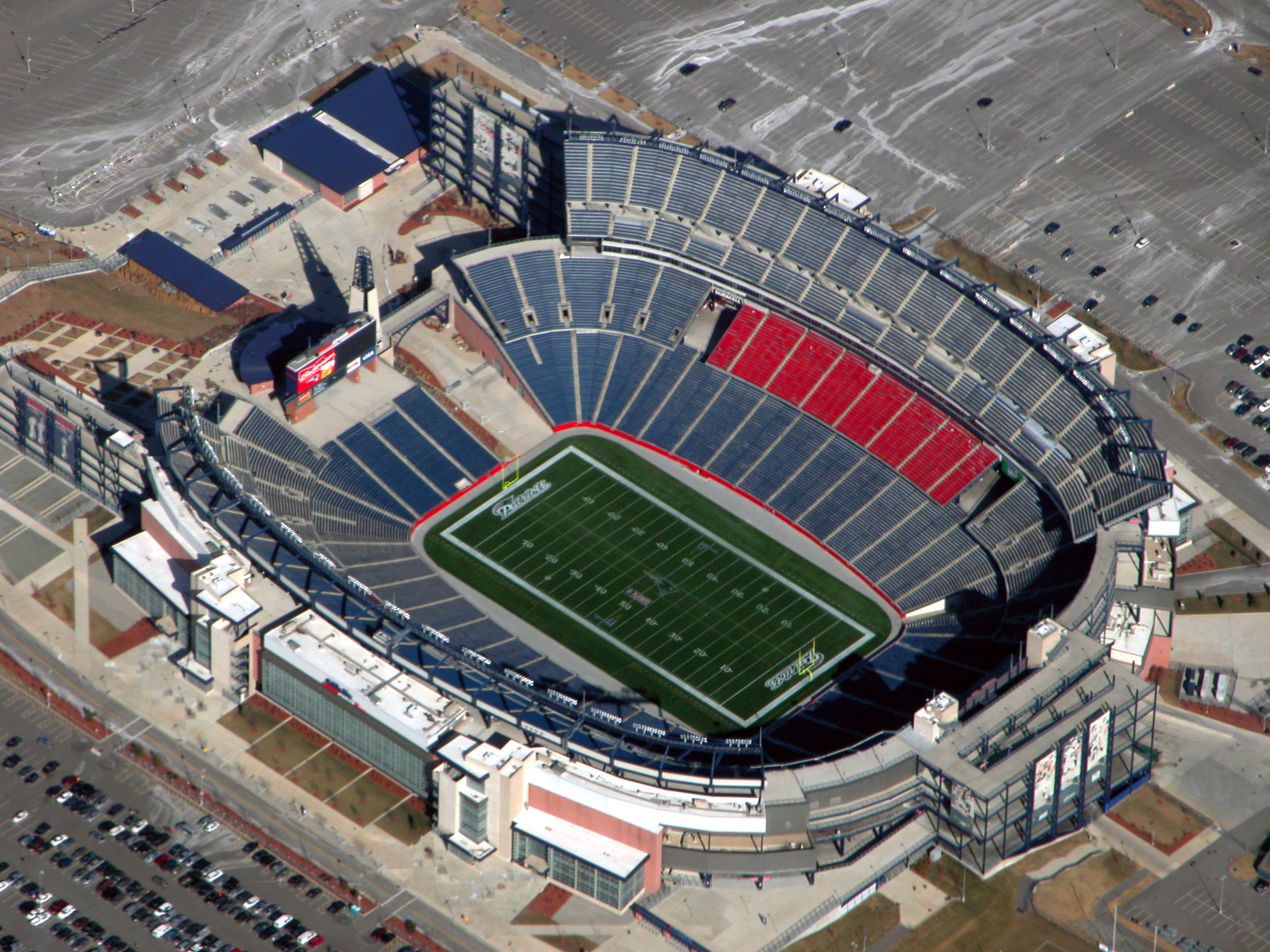
- Gillette Stadium in 2007

- Location in Massachusetts Location in the United States
- Former names: CMGI Field (May 11 – August 4, 2002); Boston Stadium (2026 FIFA World Cup)
- Address: 1 Patriot Place
- Location: Foxborough, Massachusetts, U.S.
- Coordinates: 42.091°N 71.264°W
- Owner: Kraft Group
- Operator: Kraft Group
- Capacity: American football: 64,628 (2023–present); 65,878 (2015–2023); 68,756 (2002–2014); Soccer: 20,000 (expandable); 64,146 (2026 FIFA World Cup)
- Executive suites: 82
- Surface: FieldTurf CORE (2006–present); Grass (2002–2006)
- Scoreboard: Daktronics
- Record attendance: 73,538 (concert; Zach Bryan, October 3, 2026)
- Field size: American football: 120 yd × 53 1/3 yd Soccer: 116 yd × 75 yd
- Public transit: Franklin/Foxboro; Providence/Stoughton Line at Foxboro (regular service for Franklin/Foxboro Line, game days only for Providence Line)

Construction
- Groundbreaking: March 24, 2000
- Opened: May 11, 2002
- Renovated: 2023
- Cost: $325 million ($582 million in 2025)
- Architect: HOK Sport
- Project manager: Barton Malow
- Structural engineers: Bliss and Nyitray, Inc.
- Services engineer: Vanderweil Engineers
- General contractor: Skanska

Tenants
- New England Patriots (NFL) (2002–present); New England Revolution (MLS) (2002–present); Boston Legacy FC (NWSL) (2026); Massachusetts Minutemen (NCAA) (2012–2016, 2018); Boston Cannons (MLL/PLL) (2015–2020, 2024–present); New England Revolution II (MLSNP) (2020–present)

Website
- gillettestadium.com

Gillette Stadium is a multi-purpose stadium located in Foxborough, Massachusetts, United States. The stadium is 22 miles (35 km) southwest of Downtown Boston and 18 miles (29 km) northeast of Providence, Rhode Island. It serves as the home stadium and administrative offices for both the New England Patriots of the National Football League (NFL) and the New England Revolution of Major League Soccer (MLS). It opened in 2002, replacing the adjacent Foxboro Stadium. It also served as the home venue for the University of Massachusetts (UMass) Minutemen football team in 2012 and 2013 while on-campus Warren McGuirk Alumni Stadium underwent renovations; it continued to serve as a part-time home venue for higher attendance UMass games through 2018. Gillette Stadium's seating capacity is 64,628, including 5,876 club seats and 82 luxury suites.

The town of Foxborough approved plans for the stadium's construction on December 6, 1999, and work on the stadium began on March 24, 2000. The first official event at the stadium was an MLS soccer game on May 11, 2002, where the New England Revolution defeated Dallas Burn, 2–0. Jeremiah Freed was the opening band at the WBCN River Rave on June 9, making them the first band to play at the stadium. Grand opening ceremonies were held on September 9, when the Patriots unveiled their Super Bowl XXXVI championship banner before a Monday Night Football game against the Pittsburgh Steelers. The stadium was originally known as CMGI Field before the naming rights were bought by Gillette after the "dot-com" bust. Although Gillette was acquired by Procter & Gamble in 2005, the stadium retains the Gillette name. In September 2010, Gillette and the Patriots announced that their partnership, which includes naming rights to the stadium, would extend through the 2031 season. Additionally, uBid (a wholly owned subsidiary of CMGI until 2003) continued to sponsor one of the main entrance gates to the stadium.

Gillette Stadium is served by special MBTA Commuter Rail service from Boston and Providence during events, plus regular weekday service via the Franklin/Foxboro Line, at Foxboro station. The Patriots have sold out every home game since moving to the stadium—preseason, regular season, and playoffs. This streak dates back to the 1994 season at Foxboro Stadium; by September 2016, it had reached 231 games. The stadium is owned and operated by Kraft Sports Group, a subsidiary of the Kraft Group, the company through which businessman Robert Kraft owns the Patriots and Revolution.

The stadium hosted several matches during the 2026 FIFA World Cup. Due to FIFA rules regarding stadium sponsorships, Gillette Stadium was known as Boston Stadium for the tournament, in reference to the Greater Boston area the stadium resides in.

== History ==
=== Foxboro Stadium ===
The Patriots were founded in 1960 as the Boston Patriots of the American Football League, and joined the NFL when the AFL merged into the NFL in 1970. For their first 11 seasons, the Patriots played at several venues in and around Boston, none of which were large enough or suitable enough for a professional team. The lack of a professional-caliber stadium had stymied numerous past attempts at professional football in Boston.

From 1971 to 2001, the Patriots played their home games at Foxboro Stadium. The stadium was privately funded on an extremely small budget and featured few amenities. Its aluminum benches would freeze over during cold-weather games and it had an unorganized dirt parking lot that turned to mud whenever it rained. At just over 60,000 seats, it was one of the NFL's smallest stadiums.

In 1984, team executive Chuck Sullivan funded the Victory Tour of The Jacksons, in an attempt to earn more profit for the team. Ticket sales failed, however, and the team's debt increased even further – to a final total of US$126 million. After two successive owners bought the team and stadium, it was clear that a new stadium had to be built for the team to stay in New England. This is when other cities in the New England area, including Boston (which was previously home to the Patriots), Hartford, and Providence became interested in building new stadiums to lure the Patriots away from Foxborough.

=== Location discussions ===
The first major stadium proposal from another city came in September 1993. Lowell Weicker, the Governor of Connecticut, proposed to the Connecticut General Assembly that a new stadium should be built in Hartford to attract the Patriots to move there, stating that a stadium had "potentially great benefit" if it were built. The bill passed in the State Assembly on September 27, 1993.

Back in Massachusetts, there was a proposal to build a "Megaplex" in Boston, which would be the site of the stadium, as well as a new Fenway Park (the home park of the Boston Red Sox) and a convention center. The proposed sites for this hybrid convention center-stadium were along Summer Street in South Boston or at the so-called Crosstown site along Melnea Cass Boulevard in Roxbury, adjacent to Boston's South End. The administration of Massachusetts Governor William Weld pushed for construction of a full "Megaplex" at the crosstown site, with then-new Boston Mayor Thomas Menino favoring construction of a new, stand-alone convention center in South Boston. Ultimately, the residents of neither of these neighborhoods wanted a stadium, and as a result, Menino backed out, fearing that it would affect his chance at re-election. The Fenway Park plan was cancelled after many "Save Fenway Park!" groups popped up to save the historic ballpark.

Kraft then began a plan to build a new stadium in South Boston. In that plan, Kraft was to pay for the stadium himself, hoping to win the support of Weld and Menino. He began to sketch designs, but the project was leaked to the press in December 1996. The residents of South Boston objected to a stadium being built in that location, causing Menino and Weld to become angry at Kraft. Kraft abandoned all plans for a Boston Stadium after the affair. In January 1997, Kraft began talks with Providence mayor Vincent Cianci to relocate the team to Providence and build a new stadium there. The proposed 68,000-seat domed stadium would have cost $250 million, and would have been paid through income taxes, public bonds, surcharges on tickets, and private funds. Residents of the neighborhood of the proposed project were extremely opposed to the project because the surrounding area would have needed massive infrastructure improvements. The proposal fell through after a few weeks.

During a news conference in September 1998, the team revealed plans to build a new stadium in Foxborough, keeping the team in Massachusetts. It was to be funded by the state as well as Kraft himself. This plan brought more competition from Connecticut, as a $1 billion plan to renovate an area of Hartford, including building a stadium. Kraft then signed an agreement to move the team to Hartford on November 18, 1998. The proposed stadium included 68,000 seats, 60 luxury boxes, and had a projected cost of $375 million. As before in Boston and Providence, construction of the stadium was challenged by the residents. Problems with the site were discovered, and an agreement could not be reached regarding the details of the stadium. The entire plan eventually fell through, enraging then Connecticut governor John G. Rowland, who lobbied hard for the stadium and spent weeks deliberating with Robert Kraft. Rowland announced at a press conference that he was officially "a New York Jets fan, now and probably forever". In 1999, the team officially announced that it would remain in Foxborough, which led to Gillette Stadium's construction. After the Hartford proposal fell through, Robert Kraft paid for 100% of the construction costs, a rare instance of an NFL owner privately financing the construction of a stadium.

=== Design ===
On April 18, 2000, the team revealed plans for the new stadium in Foxborough. It was announced as a 68,000-seat stadium at a cost of $325 million, with the entire cost privately funded. Boston is thus the only city in professional sports in which all facilities are privately owned and operated. The Kraft Group (owner of the NFL team the Patriots and the MLS team the Revolution) owns Gillette Stadium, the Red Sox own Fenway Park, and TD Garden is owned by Delaware North (the owner of the Bruins) (the Celtics rent the TD Garden from Delaware North).

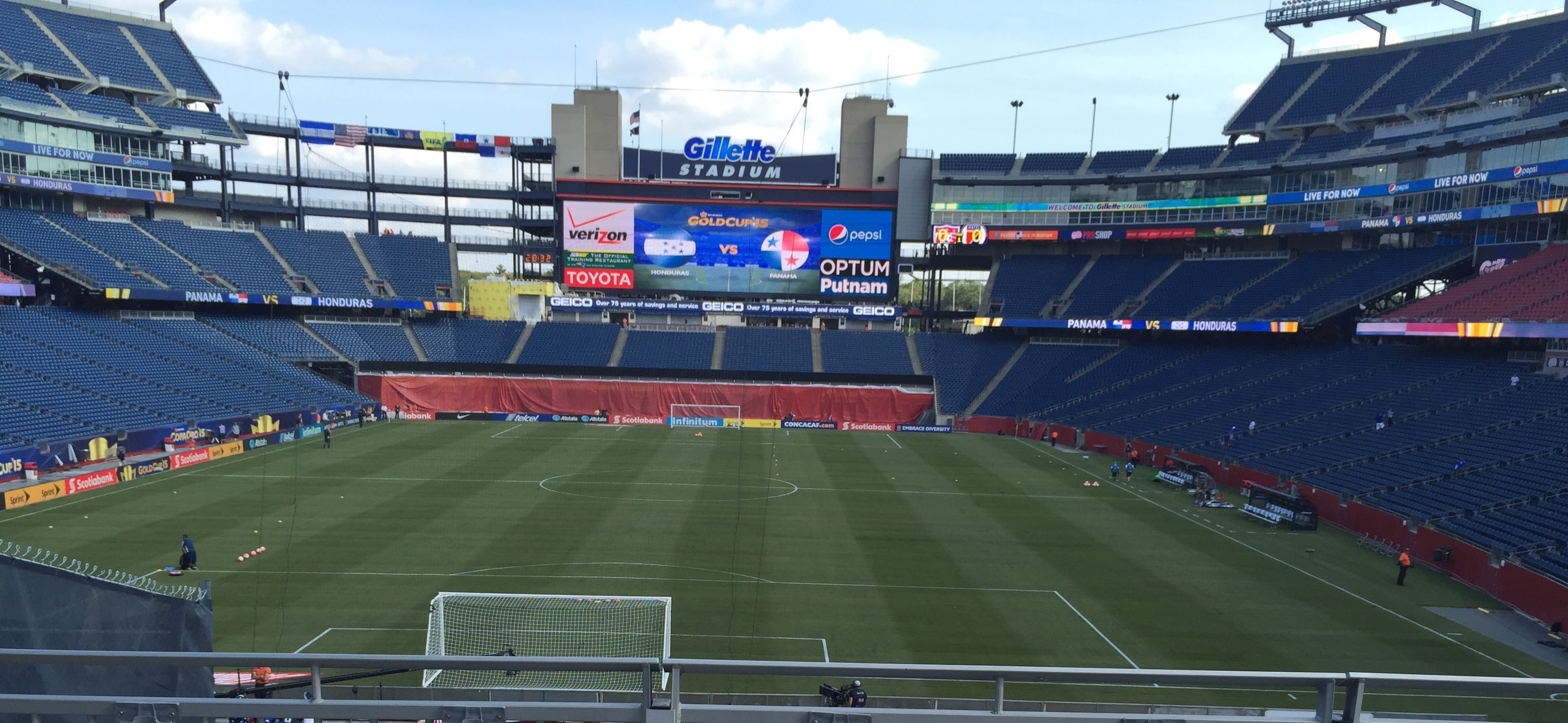
End zone club under construction, summer 2015

Concurrently announced was a new road to access the stadium from U.S. Route 1, and an additional 3,000 parking spaces to accommodate the increased number of fans.

The stadium was designed by HOK Sport (now Populous). Kraft wanted it modeled on M&T Bank Stadium which had opened in Baltimore in 1998. Kraft insisted on it having a "front door" with a Disneyland-like entrance. Populous went through 200 designs before coming up with one that Kraft liked. The entrance includes a lighthouse (which was originally designed to shoot a light 2 miles (3.2 km) high) and a bridge modeled on Boston's Longfellow Bridge. The lighthouse and bridge are now featured on the stadium's logo.

For the first eight years of its existence, the stadium used a video display, with a smaller LED scoreboard just beneath it, at each end of the field. The south side also had a large LED scoreboard in addition to the smaller one. In 2010, the stadium installed two new HD Daktronics video displays to replace the entire previous setup at both ends. At the time of their construction, the larger screen, at 41.5 feet tall and 164 feet wide (12.6 m x 50.0 m), was the second-largest video monitor in any NFL stadium; only AT&T Stadium had a larger one.

Gillette Stadium ranks first among all NFL venues in stadium food safety with 0% critical violations. The Gillette Stadium food service, instead of being outsourced like most NFL teams, is run in-house and is led by the Patriots executive director of foods and beverage David Wheeler.

From January 18, 2021, to June 14, 2021, Gillette Stadium was used as a mass distribution site for the COVID-19 vaccine, with a total of 610,283 shots being administered.

Marking the 20th anniversary of the September 11 attacks, a memorial garden was installed outside Gillette Stadium. It has a semicircle of six flowering trees, a commemorative plaque, a mural, and tribute stones with the names of the victims.

==== 2023 renovation project ====
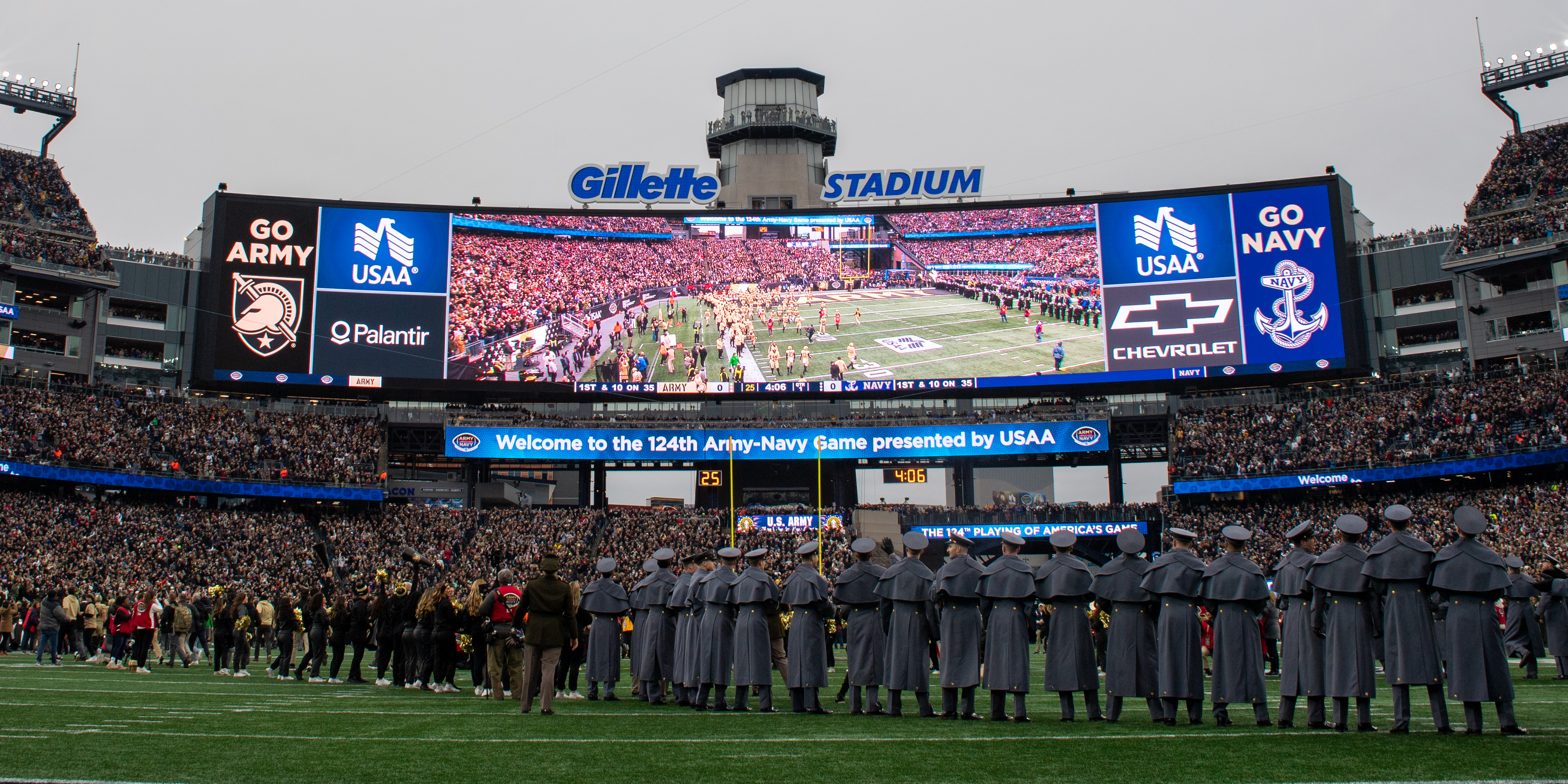
Video board completed in 2023

On December 10, 2021, a $225 million renovation project was announced. Construction began in January 2022 and was completed in September 2023. The renovations included a new 22,000-square-foot outdoor video board installed at the north end, the largest video board of its kind in the United States. A new lighthouse, which reaches 218 feet at the top, provides 360-degree views of the stadium, Patriot Place, Foxborough, and beyond. 75,000 square feet of hospitality and function spaces were constructed to connect the East and West Putnam Clubs, the Dell Technology Suite Levels, and the upper concourse. The construction of these new spaces connected all levels 360 degrees. A new plaza and fan entrance were also built on the stadium's north end.

== Events ==
=== NFL ===
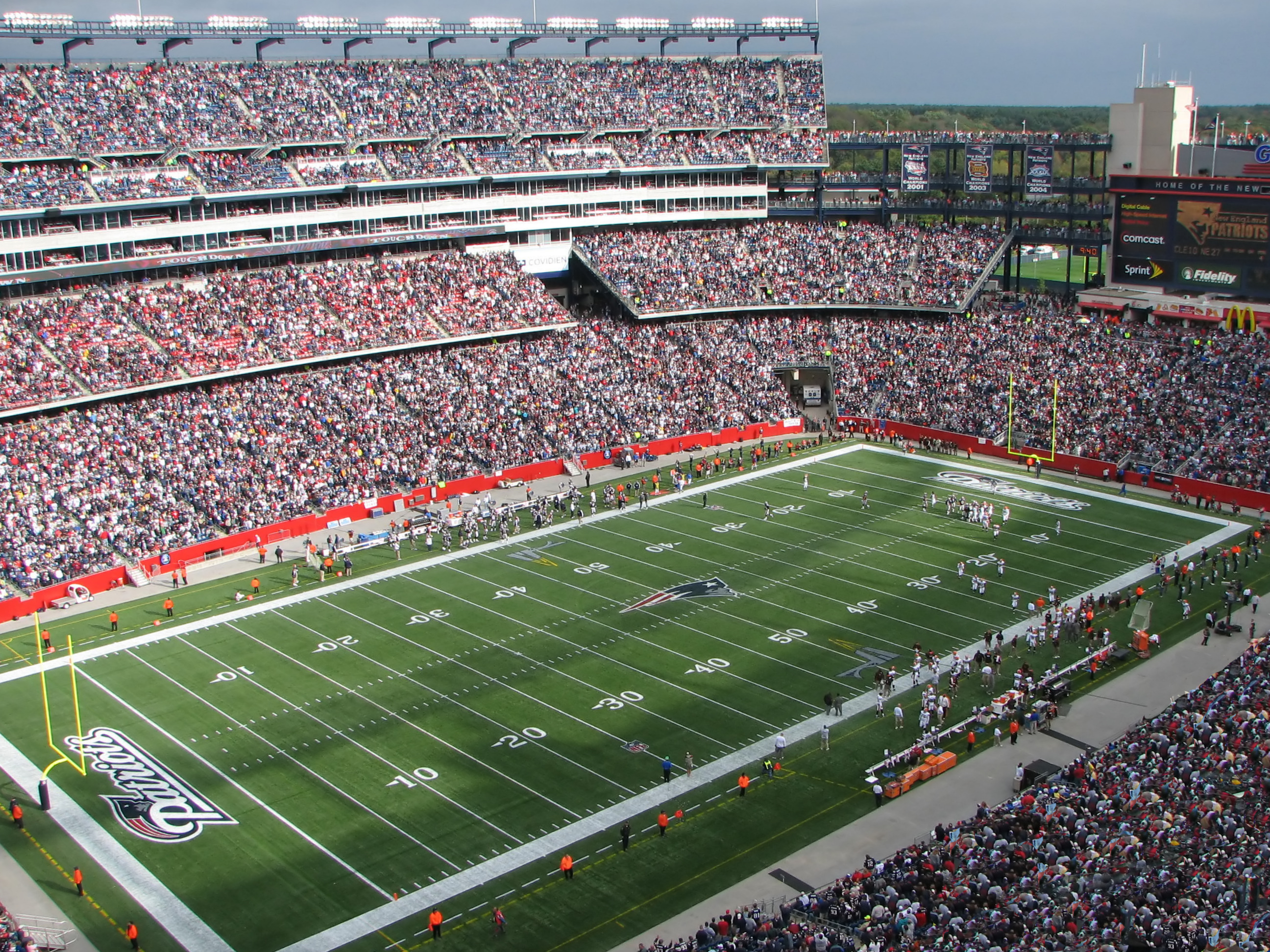
Field view, circa 2007

The venue has hosted the NFL's nationally–televised primetime season-opening games in 2002, 2004, 2005, 2015, 2017, and 2019 (when the Patriots unveiled their championship banners from Super Bowls XXXVI, XXXVIII, XXXIX, XLIX, LI, and LIII.) The first ever NFL game at the stadium was held on September 9, 2002, against the Pittsburgh Steelers, a 30–14 Patriots victory. The stadium's first playoff game was held the next year following the 2003 regular season. Playing in the Divisional Round against the Tennessee Titans, the Patriots hosted the coldest game (4 °F (2 °C), −12 °F (−7 °C) wind chill) in New England Patriots history. The Patriots won 17–14. The stadium also played host to the 2003 AFC Championship Game, in which the Patriots defeated the Indianapolis Colts 24–14.

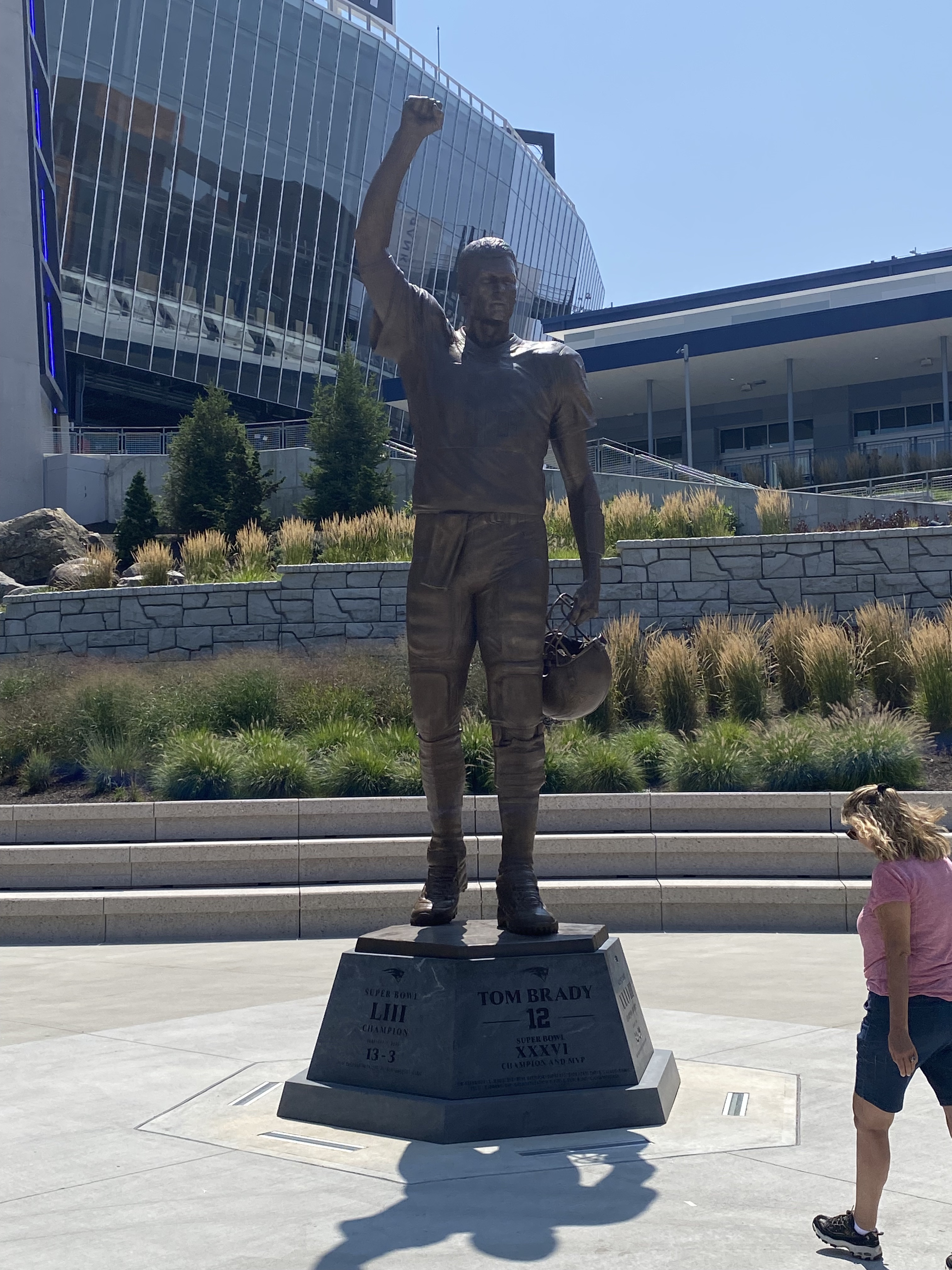
The statue of Tom Brady, displayed in front of Gillette Stadium

The Patriots won the first seven playoff games held at the stadium between the 2003 and 2007 seasons, including the 2007 AFC Championship Game, where they beat the San Diego Chargers to improve to 18–0 and advance to Super Bowl XLII. On January 10, 2010, the Baltimore Ravens beat the Patriots 33–14, giving the Patriots their first home loss in the playoffs in Gillette Stadium. The Patriots suffered their second consecutive home playoff loss on January 16, 2011, in a 28–21 New York Jets victory. During the 2011–12 NFL playoffs, the Patriots defeated the Denver Broncos, 45–10, and the stadium hosted its third AFC Championship, where they won against the Baltimore Ravens, 23–20. However, the New York Giants ruined the Patriots' season by beating them in the Super Bowl for the second time. The following year, they again hosted the AFC Championship game, where they lost 28–13 to the Baltimore Ravens in the final game for long-time Patriots radio announcer Gil Santos. During the Divisional Round of the 2014–15 NFL playoffs, the Patriots avenged their 2012 defeat by the Baltimore Ravens by beating them 35–31. The following week, they defeated the Indianapolis Colts 45–7 in the 2014 AFC Championship. The stadium hosted its sixth AFC Championship game during the 2016 playoffs, as the Patriots defeated the Pittsburgh Steelers 36–17. The seventh AFC Championship hosted at Gillette Stadium came the next year, when the Patriots knocked off the Jacksonville Jaguars by a score of 24–20. In the 2018 season, Gillette Stadium hosted a Divisional Round game, as the Patriots knocked off the Los Angeles Chargers by a score of 41–28 on the way to winning Super Bowl LIII. In Tom Brady's final game as a Patriot, they were upset by the Tennessee Titans in the First Round of the 2019 playoffs with a loss of 20–13. As of the end of the 2025 season, the Patriots had an all-time playoff record of 21–4 at the stadium.

The stadium also hosted Tom Brady's Patriots Hall of Fame induction ceremony. Inductions typically take place in front of the stadium's pro shop; however, due to Brady's stature within the organization, it was decided to utilize the venue's capacity. Over 60,000 spectators attended the event.

=== College football ===
As part of the UMass football program's move to Division I FBS, the Minutemen played all of their home games at Gillette Stadium for the 2012 and 2013 seasons. The stadium is 95 miles (153 km) away from the UMass campus in Amherst—the longest trip of any FBS member. The Minutemen's on-campus stadium, Warren McGuirk Alumni Stadium, was not suitable for FBS football in its previous configuration. Its small size (17,000 seats) would have made it prohibitively difficult to meet FBS average attendance requirements, and its press box and replay facilities were well below Mid-American Conference standards. Additionally, several nonconference teams would not even consider playing games in Amherst. McGuirk Stadium was renovated to FBS standards for the 2014 season, but the Minutemen's deal with the Kraft Group called for the Minutemen to play four of their home games in Foxborough from 2014 to 2016 in exchange for keeping part of the revenue from ticket sales. Moving forward, Gillette continued to host UMass football for games of anticipated larger attendance.

In 2023, Gillette Stadium was used as a neutral site for the Army–Navy Game. Navy also played their rivalry game with Notre Dame in Foxborough in 2026.

Date	Away team	Result	Home team	Attendance
October 23, 2010	New Hampshire	39–13	(Massachusetts) UMass Amherst	32,848
October 22, 2011	New Hampshire	27–21	(Massachusetts) UMass Amherst	24,022
September 8, 2012	Indiana	45–6	(Massachusetts) UMass Amherst	16,304
September 29, 2012	Ohio	37–34	(Massachusetts) UMass Amherst	8,321
October 20, 2012	(Ohio) Bowling Green	24–0	(Massachusetts) UMass Amherst	10,846
November 17, 2012	(New York (state)) Buffalo	29–19	(Massachusetts) UMass Amherst	12,649
November 23, 2012	Central Michigan	42–21	(Massachusetts) UMass Amherst	6,385
September 7, 2013	Maine	24–14	(Massachusetts) UMass Amherst	15,624
September 21, 2013	(Tennessee) Vanderbilt	24–7	(Massachusetts) UMass Amherst	16,419
October 12, 2013	(Ohio) Miami (OH)	10–17	(Massachusetts) UMass Amherst	21,707
October 26, 2013	Western Michigan	31–30	(Massachusetts) UMass Amherst	20,571
November 2, 2013	Northern Illinois	63–19	(Massachusetts) UMass Amherst	10,061
November 16, 2013	(Ohio) Akron	14–13	(Massachusetts) UMass Amherst	10,599
August 30, 2014	(Massachusetts) Boston College	30–7	(Massachusetts) UMass Amherst	30,479
September 6, 2014	Colorado	41–38	(Massachusetts) UMass Amherst	10,227
October 18, 2014	Eastern Michigan	14–36	(Massachusetts) UMass Amherst	12,030
September 19, 2015	(Pennsylvania) Temple	25–23	(Massachusetts) UMass Amherst	10,141
October 24, 2015	(Ohio) Toledo	51–35	(Massachusetts) UMass Amherst	12,793
November 7, 2015	(Ohio) Akron	17–13	(Massachusetts) UMass Amherst	6,228
September 10, 2016	(Massachusetts) Boston College	26–7	(Massachusetts) UMass Amherst	25,112
September 24, 2016	Mississippi State	47–35	(Massachusetts) UMass Amherst	13,074
October 15, 2016	Louisiana Tech	56–28	(Massachusetts) UMass Amherst	13,311
November 10, 2018	(Utah) BYU	35–16	(Massachusetts) UMass Amherst	14,082
December 9, 2023	(New York (state)) Army	17–11	(Maryland) Navy	65,878
October 31, 2026	(Indiana) Notre Dame	35–13	(Maryland) Navy	61,293

=== Ice hockey ===
Gillette Stadium also hosted the eighth edition of the NHL Winter Classic, between the Boston Bruins and Montreal Canadiens, on January 1, 2016.

Date	Away team	Result	Home team	Event	Spectators
December 31, 2015	(Canada) Les Canadiennes de Montréal	1–1	(United States) Boston Pride	2016 Outdoor Women's Classic	—
January 1, 2016	(Canada) Montreal Canadiens	5–1	(United States) Boston Bruins	2016 NHL Winter Classic	67,246

=== Notable soccer games ===
Memorable Major League Soccer playoff victories include wins over the Chicago Fire in the 2005 and 2007 Eastern Conference Final, sending the Revs to the MLS Cup. Additionally, the venue hosted MLS Cup 2002, four games of the 2003 FIFA Women's World Cup, and some Copa America Centenario matches in 2016.

The crowd of 61,316 drawn to the 2002 MLS Cup Final was the largest stand-alone MLS post-season crowd on record until the 2018 MLS Cup in Atlanta at Mercedes-Benz Stadium. The stadium's soccer attendance record would once again be broken on April 27, 2024, during a regular season match between the Revolution and Inter Miami CF, who had signed Lionel Messi the year prior; 65,612 would watch the Revolution fall 1–4.

The stadium hosted eight of Boston Legacy FC's home games in the 2026 season, their first in the National Women's Soccer League. The club's first-ever match on March 16, a 1-0 loss to Gotham FC, was attended by 30,207 fans, which set a then-league record for largest attendance at an expansion team's first home game.

==== MLS Cup ====
Date	Winning Team	Result	Losing Team	Tournament	Spectators
October 20, 2002	(United States) Los Angeles Galaxy	1–0	(United States) New England Revolution	MLS Cup 2002	61,316

==== International soccer matches ====
Date	Winning Team	Result	Losing Team	Tournament	Spectators
May 19, 2002	Netherlands	2–0	United States	Friendly	36,778
July 11, 2003	United States	2–0	El Salvador	2003 CONCACAF Gold Cup First Round	33,652
July 11, 2003	Canada	1–0	Costa Rica	2003 CONCACAF Gold Cup First Round	33,652
July 13, 2003	United States	2–0	Martinique	2003 CONCACAF Gold Cup First Round	8,780
July 13, 2003	Cuba	2–0	Canada	2003 CONCACAF Gold Cup First Round	8,780
July 15, 2003	El Salvador	1–0	Martinique	2003 CONCACAF Gold Cup First Round	10,361
July 15, 2003	Costa Rica	3–0	Cuba	2003 CONCACAF Gold Cup First Round	10,361
July 19, 2003	United States	5–0	Cuba	2003 CONCACAF Gold Cup Quarterfinals	15,627
July 19, 2003	Costa Rica	5–2	El Salvador	2003 CONCACAF Gold Cup Quarterfinals	15,627
June 2, 2004	United States	4–0	Honduras	Friendly	11,533
September 4, 2004	United States	2–0	El Salvador	2006 FIFA World Cup qualification - CONCACAF third round	25,266
July 11, 2005	United States	0–0	Costa Rica	2005 CONCACAF Gold Cup Group B	15,211
July 11, 2005	Canada	2–1	Cuba	2005 CONCACAF Gold Cup Group B	15,211
July 16, 2005	Honduras	3–2	Costa Rica	2005 CONCACAF Gold Cup Quarterfinals	22,108
July 16, 2005	United States	3–1	Jamaica	2005 CONCACAF Gold Cup Quarterfinals	22,108
October 12, 2005	United States	2–0	Panama	2006 FIFA World Cup qualification - CONCACAF fourth round	9,192
April 14, 2007	United States women	5–0	Mexico women	Women's International Friendly	18,184
June 12, 2007	United States	4–0	El Salvador	2007 CONCACAF Gold Cup Group B	26,523
June 12, 2007	Trinidad and Tobago	1–1	Guatemala	2007 CONCACAF Gold Cup Group B	26,523
June 16, 2007	Canada	3–0	Guatemala	2007 CONCACAF Gold Cup Quarterfinals	22,412
June 16, 2007	United States	2–1	Panama	2007 CONCACAF Gold Cup Quarterfinals	22,412
September 12, 2007	Brazil	3–1	Mexico	Friendly	67,584
June 6, 2008	Venezuela	2–0	Brazil	Friendly	N/A
July 11, 2009	United States	2–2	Haiti	2009 CONCACAF Gold Cup Group B	24,137
July 11, 2009	Honduras	4–0	Grenada	2009 CONCACAF Gold Cup Group B	24,137
June 4, 2011	Spain	4–0	United States	Friendly	64,121
June 15, 2013	United States women	4–1	South Korea women	Women's International Friendly	13,035
September 10, 2013	Brazil	3–1	Portugal	Brasil Global Tour	62,310
June 6, 2014	Portugal	1–0	Mexico	Friendly	56,292
July 10, 2015	Honduras	1–1	Panama	2015 CONCACAF Gold Cup Group A	46,720
July 10, 2015	United States	1–0	Haiti	2015 CONCACAF Gold Cup Group A	46,720
September 8, 2015	Brazil	4–1	United States	Friendly	29,308
June 10, 2016	Chile	2–1	Bolivia	Copa América Centenario Group D	19,392
June 12, 2016	Peru	1–0	Brazil	Copa América Centenario Group B	36,187
June 18, 2016	Argentina	4–1	Venezuela	Copa América Centenario Quarterfinal	59,183
May 19, 2019	(England) Chelsea F.C.	3–0	(United States) New England Revolution	Club Friendly	27,329
July 29, 2019	(Portugal) S.L. Benfica	1–0	(Italy) A.C. Milan	2019 International Champions Cup	27,565
March 26, 2026	France	2–1	Brazil	Friendly	66,215

=== 2003 FIFA Women's World Cup ===
Date	Winning Team	Result	Losing Team	Tournament	Spectators
September 27, 2003	Norway	7–1	South Korea	Group B	14,356
September 27, 2003	Canada	3–1	Japan	Group C	14,356
October 1, 2003	United States	1–0	Norway	Quarterfinals	25,103
October 1, 2003	Sweden	2–1	Brazil	Quarterfinals	25,103

=== 2026 FIFA World Cup ===
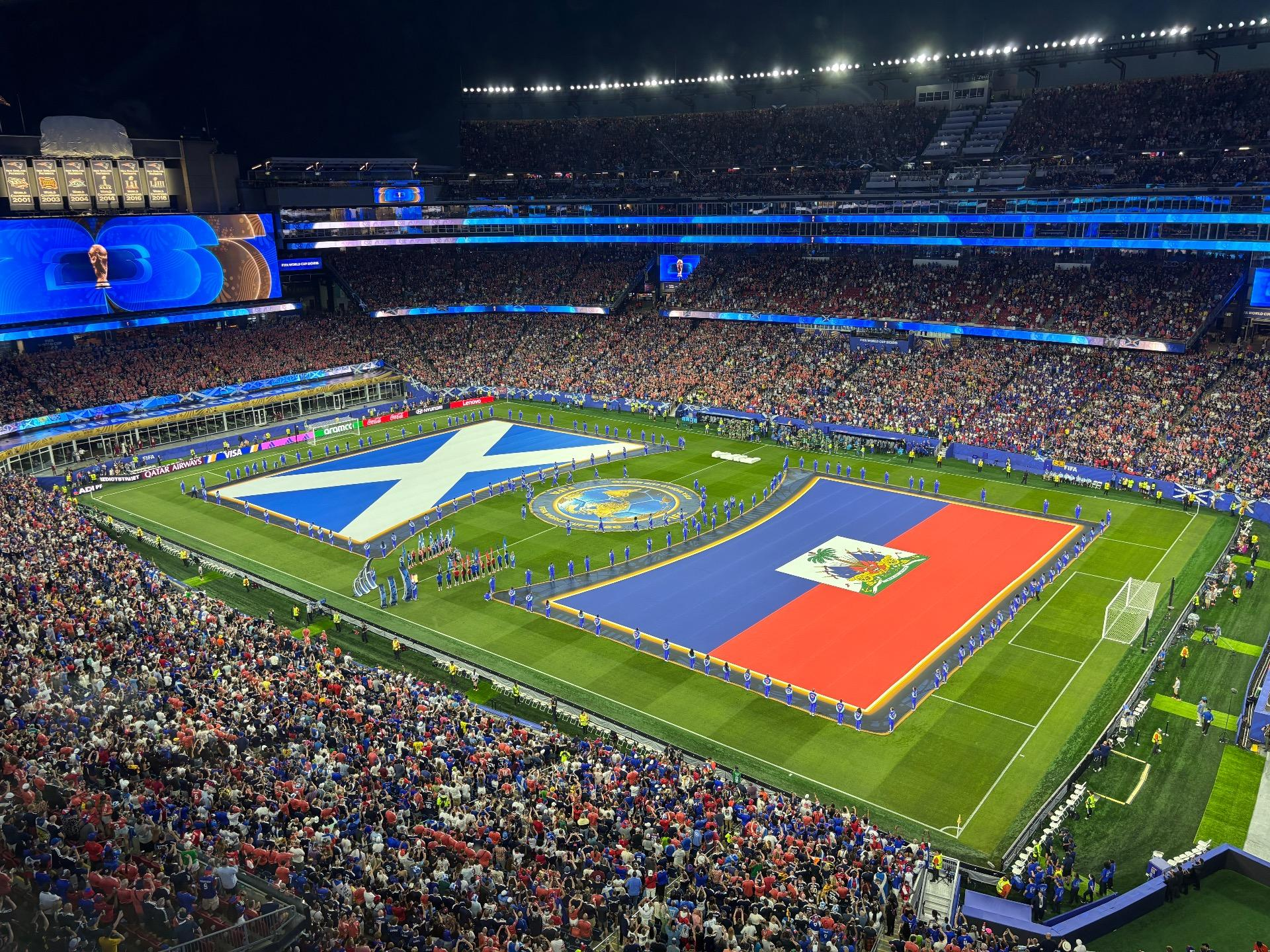
Inside Gillette Stadium before the start of the Scotland vs. Haiti match during the 2026 FIFA World Cup

Gillette Stadium hosted seven matches during the 2026 FIFA World Cup: five in the group stage, one in the Round of 32, and one in the quarterfinals. It was one of eleven US venues selected to host matches during the tournament. During the event, the stadium was temporarily renamed to "Boston Stadium" in accordance with FIFA's policy on corporate sponsored names.

Date	Time (UTC−4)	Team #1	Res.	Team #2	Round	Attendance
June 13, 2026	21:00	Haiti	0–1	Scotland	Group C	64,146
June 16, 2026	18:00	Iraq	1–4	Norway	Group I	63,106
June 19, 2026	18:00	Scotland	0–1	Morocco	Group C	64,146
June 23, 2026	16:00	England	0–0	Ghana	Group L	63,983
June 26, 2026	15:00	Norway	1–4	France	Group I	64,146
June 29, 2026	16:30	Germany	1–1 (a.e.t.) (3–4 pen.)	Paraguay	Round of 32	63,945
July 9, 2026	16:00	France	2–0	Morocco	Quarterfinal	63,811

=== Lacrosse ===
Gillette Stadium hosted the NCAA Men's Lacrosse Championships in 2008, 2009, 2012, 2017, 2018, and 2025 and was the home of the Boston Cannons for the 2015 season.

==== Collegiate ====
Dates	Tournaments	Result			Spectators
Dates	Tournaments	DI	DII	DIII	Spectators
May 10–26, 2008	Division I Men's, Division II & Division III	(New York (state)) Syracuse	(New York (state)) NYIT	(Maryland) Salisbury	97,194
May 9–25, 2009	Division I Men's, Division II & Division III	(New York (state)) Syracuse	(New York (state)) C.W. Post	(New York (state)) Cortland State	78,529
May 9–25, 2012	Division I Men's, Division II & Division III	(Maryland) Loyola (MD)	(New York (state)) Dowling	(Maryland) Salisbury	62,590
May 12–28, 2017	Division I Women's	Maryland	-	-	11,668
May 13–29, 2017	Division I Men's, Division II & Division III	Maryland	(South Carolina) Limestone	(Maryland) Salisbury	59,501
May 12–28, 2018	Division I Men's, Division II & Division III	(Connecticut) Yale	(Massachusetts) Merrimack	(Connecticut) Wesleyan	60,071

==== Major League Lacrosse ====
Date	Away	Result	Home	Spectators
April 12, 2015	(Colorado) Denver Outlaws	13–16	(Massachusetts) Boston Cannons	4,285
April 26, 2015	(North Carolina) Charlotte Hounds	12–11 (OT)	(Massachusetts) Boston Cannons	3,612
May 3, 2015	(New York (state)) New York Lizards	15–13	(Massachusetts) Boston Cannons	4,713
May 17, 2015	(New York (state)) Rochester Rattlers	16–17 (OT)	(Massachusetts) Boston Cannons	5,654
May 30, 2015	Florida Launch	9–13	(Massachusetts) Boston Cannons	10,142
June 28, 2015	(Maryland) Chesapeake Bayhawks	11–14	(Massachusetts) Boston Cannons	7,211
July 11, 2015	Ohio Machine	19–12	(Massachusetts) Boston Cannons	6,813

==== Premier Lacrosse League ====
On February 15, 2019, the Premier Lacrosse League announced that Boston would be the first city on the schedule for the 2019 season. It was also announced that Gillette Stadium would be the venue to host the league on June 1 and 2. The PLL was planning on returning to Gillette for the 2020 season, but the COVID-19 pandemic put the season on pause and the league scrapped their 2020 schedule.

Date	Away	Result	Home	Spectators
June 1, 2019	Archers L.C.	13–12 (OT)	Chrome L.C.	PLL announced 13,681 over three games (average of 4,560 for three games)
June 1, 2019	Whipsnakes L.C.	15–14 (OT)	Chaos L.C.	PLL announced 13,681 over three games (average of 4,560 for three games)
June 2, 2019	Atlas L.C.	9–11	Redwoods L.C.	PLL announced 13,681 over three games (average of 4,560 for three games)
June 4, 2021	Cannons	11–12	Redwoods	
June 5, 2021	Whipsnakes	13–7	Chaos	
June 5, 2021	Archers	18–6	Atlas	
June 6, 2021	Waterdogs	7–13	Cannons	
June 6, 2021	Chrome	11–14	Redwoods	
July 16, 2022	PLL All-Star Game; Team Farrell 13–33 Team Baptiste			
September 3, 2022; Quarterfinals	Chaos	11–3	Chrome	
September 3, 2022; Quarterfinals	Redwoods	8–13	Archers	
September 3, 2022; Quarterfinals	Waterdogs	19–14	Atlas	
September 4, 2023; Quarterfinals	Redwoods	15–9	Chaos	
September 4, 2023; Quarterfinals	Waterdogs	15–12	Whipsnakes	
September 4, 2023; Quarterfinals	Cannons	20–11	Atlas	
September 4, 2024; Quarterfinals	Whipsnakes	11–10	Outlaws	
September 4, 2024; Quarterfinals	Cannons	4–8	Chaos	

==== Women's Professional Lacrosse League ====
On June 2, 2019, Gillette hosted a handful of games for the Women's Professional Lacrosse League to start their 2019 season.

Date	Winning Team	Result	Opponent	Ref.
June 1, 2019	Command	11–8	Fire	
June 2, 2019	Fight	6–4	Pride	

=== Concerts ===
Date	Artist	Opening act(s)	Tour / Concert name	Attendance	Gross	Notes
September 5, 2002	The Rolling Stones	The Pretenders	The Licks Tour	—	—	
July 6, 2003	Metallica	Limp Bizkit; Linkin Park; Deftones; Mudvayne	The Summer Sanitarium Tour	42,898 / 48,600	$3,217,350	
July 22, 2003	Bon Jovi	Sheryl Crow; Goo Goo Dolls	Bounce Tour	—	—	
August 1, 2003	Bruce Springsteen and the E Street Band	—	The Rising Tour	96,108 / 98,559	$7,107,215	
August 2, 2003	Bruce Springsteen and the E Street Band	—	The Rising Tour	96,108 / 98,559	$7,107,215	
July 24, 2004	Toby Keith	Montgomery Gentry; Jo Dee Messina; Gretchen Wilson; Scotty Emerick; Don Campbell Band	The Big Throwdown Tour	39,717 / 41,354	$2,850,279	
July 23, 2005	Kenny Chesney	Keith Urban; Gretchen Wilson; Uncle Kracker; Pat Green	The Somewhere in the Sun Tour	50,860 / 50,860	$3,263,448	
September 3, 2005	Green Day	Jimmy Eat World; Against Me!	The American Idiot Tour	26,781 / 43,615	$1,006,421	
July 16, 2006	Kenny Chesney	Dierks Bentley; Big & Rich; Carrie Underwood; Gretchen Wilson	The Road and The Radio Tour	55,124 / 55,124	$4,136,945	
July 27, 2006	Bon Jovi	Nickelback	The Have a Nice Day Tour	45,874 / 45,874	$3,384,804	
September 20, 2006	The Rolling Stones	Kanye West	A Bigger Bang Tour	44,115 / 45,285	$4,042,193	
July 28, 2007	Kenny Chesney	Brooks & Dunn; Sugarland; Sara Evans; Pat Green	The Flip-Flop Summer Tour	56,926 / 56,926	$4,496,363	
September 2, 2007	Jimmy Buffett	—	Bama Breeze Tour	—	—	
September 8, 2007	Jimmy Buffett	—	Bama Breeze Tour	—	—	
July 26, 2008	Kenny Chesney	Keith Urban; LeAnn Rimes; Gary Allan; Sammy Hagar	The Poets and Pirates Tour	57,394 / 57,394	$5,274,364	
August 2, 2008	Bruce Springsteen and the E Street Band	—	Magic Tour		$4,760,337	
July 18, 2009	Elton John; Billy Joel	—	Face to Face 2009	52,007 / 52,007	$6,209,342	
July 28, 2009	AC/DC	Anvil	The Black Ice World Tour	—	—	
August 15, 2009	Kenny Chesney	Sugarland; Montgomery Gentry; Miranda Lambert; Lady Antebellum	The Sun City Carnival Tour	57,890 / 57,890	$5,041,001	
September 20, 2009	U2	Snow Patrol	The U2 360° Tour	69,402 / 69,402	$12,859,778	
September 21, 2009	U2	Snow Patrol	The U2 360° Tour	69,402 / 69,402	$12,859,778	
June 5, 2010	Taylor Swift	Kellie Pickler; Gloriana; Justin Bieber	Fearless Tour	56,868 / 56,868	$3,726,157	Swift became the first woman to headline the stadium.
June 12, 2010	Eagles	Dixie Chicks; Keith Urban	The Long Road Out of Eden Tour	26,433 / 41,582	$2,822,410	
July 24, 2010	Bon Jovi	Kid Rock	The Circle Tour	51,138 / 51,138	$4,418,585	
August 21, 2010	Brad Paisley	Jason Aldean; Darius Rucker; Sara Evans; Easton Corbin	The H2O Tour	51,107 / 51,107	$3,476,779	
June 25, 2011	Taylor Swift	Needtobreathe; Randy Montana; James Wesley	Speak Now World Tour	110,800 / 110,800	$8,026,350	
June 26, 2011	Taylor Swift	Needtobreathe; Randy Montana; James Wesley	Speak Now World Tour	110,800 / 110,800	$8,026,350	
August 26, 2011	Kenny Chesney	Zac Brown Band; Billy Currington; Uncle Kracker	The Goin' Coastal Tour	106,755 / 106,755	$9,228,920	
August 27, 2011	Kenny Chesney	Zac Brown Band; Billy Currington; Uncle Kracker	The Goin' Coastal Tour	106,755 / 106,755	$9,228,920	
August 18, 2012	Bruce Springsteen and the E Street Band	—	The Wrecking Ball World Tour	49,621 / 50,000	$4,548,896	
August 24, 2012	Kenny Chesney; Tim McGraw	Grace Potter and the Nocturnals; Jake Owen	The Brothers of the Sun Tour	111,209 / 111,209	$9,926,110	This was the birth of No Shoes Nation.
August 25, 2012	Kenny Chesney; Tim McGraw	Grace Potter and the Nocturnals; Jake Owen	The Brothers of the Sun Tour	111,209 / 111,209	$9,926,110	This was the birth of No Shoes Nation.
July 20, 2013	Bon Jovi	The J. Geils Band	The Because We Can Tour	45,912 / 45,912	$3,514,571	
July 26, 2013	Taylor Swift	Ed Sheeran; Austin Mahone; Joel Crouse	The Red Tour	110,712 / 110,712	$9,464,063	At the first show, Carly Simon was a special guest.
July 27, 2013	Taylor Swift	Ed Sheeran; Austin Mahone; Joel Crouse	The Red Tour	110,712 / 110,712	$9,464,063	At the first show, Carly Simon was a special guest.
August 23, 2013	Kenny Chesney; Eric Church	Eli Young Band; Kacey Musgraves	The No Shoes Nation Tour	109,207 / 109,207	$9,465,256	
August 24, 2013	Kenny Chesney; Eric Church	Eli Young Band; Kacey Musgraves	The No Shoes Nation Tour	109,207 / 109,207	$9,465,256	
May 31, 2014	George Strait	Tim McGraw; Faith Hill; Cassadee Pope	The Cowboy Rides Away Tour	55,863 / 55,863	$5,005,789	
July 1, 2014	Beyoncé; Jay-Z	—	The On the Run Tour	52,802 / 52,802	$5,738,114	Jay-Z became the first rapper to headline the stadium. First Black artists to headline at the stadium.
August 7, 2014	One Direction	5 Seconds of Summer	The Where We Are Tour	148,251 / 148,251	$13,475,239	First musical act to headline three consecutive shows at the stadium.
August 8, 2014	One Direction	5 Seconds of Summer	The Where We Are Tour	148,251 / 148,251	$13,475,239	First musical act to headline three consecutive shows at the stadium.
August 9, 2014	One Direction	5 Seconds of Summer	The Where We Are Tour	148,251 / 148,251	$13,475,239	First musical act to headline three consecutive shows at the stadium.
August 10, 2014	Luke Bryan	Dierks Bentley; Lee Brice; Cole Swindell	The That's My Kind of Night Tour	56,048 / 56,048	$4,349,568	
July 24, 2015	Taylor Swift	Vance Joy; Shawn Mendes; Haim	The 1989 World Tour	116,849 / 116,849	$12,533,166	Walk the Moon was a special guest.
July 25, 2015	Taylor Swift	Vance Joy; Shawn Mendes; Haim	The 1989 World Tour	116,849 / 116,849	$12,533,166	MKTO was a special guest.
August 22, 2015	AC/DC	Vintage Trouble	Rock or Bust World Tour	48,000 / 50,000	—	
August 28, 2015	Kenny Chesney; Jason Aldean	Brantley Gilbert; Cole Swindell; Old Dominion	The Big Revival Tour; The Burn It Down Tour	120,206 / 120,206	$11,624,917	
August 29, 2015	Kenny Chesney; Jason Aldean	Brantley Gilbert; Cole Swindell; Old Dominion	The Big Revival Tour; The Burn It Down Tour	120,206 / 120,206	$11,624,917	
September 12, 2015	One Direction	Icona Pop	The On the Road Again Tour	48,167 / 48,167	$4,493,993	Liam Payne and Niall Horan, respectively, made a cover of "22" by Taylor Swift because of the 22nd birthday of both.
September 25, 2015	Ed Sheeran	Passenger; Christina Perri	x Tour	51,996 / 54,000	$3,234,377	
June 3, 2016	Beyoncé	DJ Khaled	The Formation World Tour	48,304 / 48,304	$6,008,698	
July 15, 2016	Luke Bryan	Little Big Town; Chris Stapleton; Dustin Lynch	The Kill the Lights Tour	76,450 / 87,871	$7,511,536	
July 16, 2016	Luke Bryan	Little Big Town; Chris Stapleton; Dustin Lynch	The Kill the Lights Tour	76,450 / 87,871	$7,511,536	
July 19, 2016	Guns N' Roses	Lenny Kravitz	The Not In This Lifetime... Tour	65,472 / 71,099	$8,302,575	
July 20, 2016	Guns N' Roses	Lenny Kravitz	The Not In This Lifetime... Tour	65,472 / 71,099	$8,302,575	
July 30, 2016	Coldplay	Alessia Cara; Foxes	A Head Full of Dreams Tour	54,952 / 54,952	$6,530,260	
August 26, 2016	Kenny Chesney	Miranda Lambert; Sam Hunt; Old Dominion	The Spread the Love Tour	121,399 / 121,399	$11,455,368	
August 27, 2016	Kenny Chesney	Miranda Lambert; Sam Hunt; Old Dominion	The Spread the Love Tour	121,399 / 121,399	$11,455,368	
September 14, 2016	Bruce Springsteen and the E Street Band	—	The River Tour	48,324 / 51,664	$5,439,521	
May 19, 2017	Metallica	Volbeat; Local H Mix Master Mike	The WorldWired Tour	47,778 / 48,905	$6,095,723	
June 25, 2017	U2	The Lumineers	The Joshua Tree Tour 2017	55,231 / 55,231	$6,881,340	
August 4, 2017	Coldplay	AlunaGeorge; Izzy Bizu	A Head Full of Dreams Tour	52,188 / 52,188	$6,263,906	
August 25, 2017	Kenny Chesney	Thomas Rhett; Old Dominion; Midland	The No Shoes Nation Tour 2017	121,642 / 121,642	$12,095,688	
August 26, 2017	Kenny Chesney	Thomas Rhett; Old Dominion; Midland	The No Shoes Nation Tour 2017	121,642 / 121,642	$12,095,688	
July 26, 2018	Taylor Swift	Camila Cabello; Charli XCX	Taylor Swift's Reputation Stadium Tour	174,764 / 174,764	$21,779,846	Hayley Kiyoko was a special guest on night one. Swift also became the first woman to headline three consecutive nights at the venue.
July 27, 2018	Taylor Swift	Camila Cabello; Charli XCX	Taylor Swift's Reputation Stadium Tour	174,764 / 174,764	$21,779,846	Hayley Kiyoko was a special guest on night one. Swift also became the first woman to headline three consecutive nights at the venue.
July 28, 2018	Taylor Swift	Camila Cabello; Charli XCX	Taylor Swift's Reputation Stadium Tour	174,764 / 174,764	$21,779,846	Hayley Kiyoko was a special guest on night one. Swift also became the first woman to headline three consecutive nights at the venue.
August 5, 2018	Beyoncé; Jay-Z	Chloe x Halle; DJ Khaled	On the Run II Tour	47,667 / 47,667	$6,159,980	
August 24, 2018	Kenny Chesney	Dierks Bentley; Brothers Osborne; Brandon Lay	Trip Around the Sun Tour	121,714/121,714	$11,631,679	
August 25, 2018	Kenny Chesney	Dierks Bentley; Brothers Osborne; Brandon Lay	Trip Around the Sun Tour	121,714/121,714	$11,631,679	
September 14, 2018	Ed Sheeran	Snow Patrol; Anne-Marie	÷ Tour	110,238 / 110,238	$9,382,550	
September 15, 2018	Ed Sheeran	Snow Patrol; Anne-Marie	÷ Tour	110,238 / 110,238	$9,382,550	
June 21, 2019	Luke Bryan	Cole Swindell; Brett Young; Jon Langston	Sunset Repeat Tour	TBA	TBA	
June 22, 2019	Dead & Company		Summer Tour 2019	40,509 / 43,779	$3,281,808	
July 7, 2019	The Rolling Stones	Gary Clark Jr.	No Filter Tour	49,669 / 49,669	$11,675,732	This concert was originally scheduled to take place on June 8, 2019, but was postponed due to Mick Jagger recovering from a heart procedure.
August 17, 2019	George Strait		The George Strait 2019 Tour			
July 2, 2022	Dead & Company		Summer Tour 2022			There was a one-hour delay due to thunderstorms.
July 21, 2022	The Weeknd	Kaytranada; Mike Dean	After Hours til Dawn Stadium Tour	48,993 / 56,257	$6,278,792	
July 27, 2022	Elton John		Farewell Yellow Brick Road			
July 28, 2022	Elton John		Farewell Yellow Brick Road			
August 26, 2022	Kenny Chesney	Dan + Shay; Old Dominion; Carly Pearce	Here and Now Tour	122,021 / 122,021	$12,968,004	
August 27, 2022	Kenny Chesney	Dan + Shay; Old Dominion; Carly Pearce	Here and Now Tour	122,021 / 122,021	$12,968,004	
September 9, 2022	Rammstein		North American Stadium Tour			
May 19, 2023	Taylor Swift	Phoebe Bridgers; Gayle	The Eras Tour	—	—	
May 20, 2023	Taylor Swift	Phoebe Bridgers; Gayle	The Eras Tour	—	—	
May 21, 2023	Taylor Swift	Phoebe Bridgers; Gracie Abrams	The Eras Tour	—	—	
June 30, 2023	Ed Sheeran		+–=÷× Tour			
July 1, 2023	Ed Sheeran		+–=÷× Tour			The July 1 show set a single-show attendance record with 71,723 in attendance.
July 21, 2023	Luke Combs	David Lee Murphy; Gary Allan; The Avett Brothers; Flatland Cavalry; Brent Cobb; Lainey Wilson; Riley Green	Luke Combs World Tour			Night 1 - Murphy, Allan, Avett Brothers; Night 2 - Flatland Cavalry, Cobb, Green, Wilson
July 22, 2023	Luke Combs	David Lee Murphy; Gary Allan; The Avett Brothers; Flatland Cavalry; Brent Cobb; Lainey Wilson; Riley Green	Luke Combs World Tour			Night 1 - Murphy, Allan, Avett Brothers; Night 2 - Flatland Cavalry, Cobb, Green, Wilson
August 1, 2023	Beyoncé		Renaissance World Tour	49,740 / 49,740	$13,801,160	
August 24, 2023	Bruce Springsteen		Springsteen and E Street Band 2023 Tour			
August 26, 2023	Bruce Springsteen		Springsteen and E Street Band 2023 Tour			
September 23, 2023	Billy Joel Stevie Nicks					
September 28, 2023	Karol G	Agudelo; Young Miko	Mañana Será Bonito Tour			
May 30, 2024	The Rolling Stones	The Red Clay Strays	Hackney Diamonds Tour			
August 2, 2024	Metallica	Pantera; Mammoth WVH	M72 World Tour	127,889 / 127,889	$16,791,826	
August 4, 2024	Metallica	Five Finger Death Punch; Ice Nine Kills	M72 World Tour	127,889 / 127,889	$16,791,826	
August 21, 2024	P!nk	The Script; Sheryl Crow	Summer Carnival			
August 23, 2024	Kenny Chesney; Zac Brown Band	Megan Moroney; Uncle Kracker	Sun Goes Down 2024 Tour			This was Chesney's 22nd show at the stadium.
August 24, 2024	Kenny Chesney; Zac Brown Band	Megan Moroney; Uncle Kracker	Sun Goes Down 2024 Tour			
August 25, 2024	Kenny Chesney; Zac Brown Band	Megan Moroney; Uncle Kracker	Sun Goes Down 2024 Tour			
May 4, 2025	AC/DC	The Pretty Reckless	Power Up Tour			
May 12, 2025	Kendrick Lamar; SZA	Mustard	Grand National Tour	49,793 / 49,793	$10,211,688	
May 31, 2025	Post Malone; Jelly Roll		Big Ass Stadium Tour			
June 10, 2025	The Weeknd	Playboi Carti; Mike Dean	After Hours til Dawn Tour	88,432 / 88,432	$11,498,903	
June 11, 2025	The Weeknd	Playboi Carti; Mike Dean	After Hours til Dawn Tour	88,432 / 88,432	$11,498,903	
June 21, 2025	George Strait; Chris Stapleton	Parker McCollum				
July 15, 2025	Coldplay	Ayra Starr; Elyanna	Music of the Spheres World Tour			The July 16th concert made headlines worldwide after tech CEO Andy Byron was caught having an extramarital affair with his firm Astronomer's chief human resources officer, Kristin Cabot.
July 16, 2025	Coldplay	Ayra Starr; Elyanna	Music of the Spheres World Tour			The July 16th concert made headlines worldwide after tech CEO Andy Byron was caught having an extramarital affair with his firm Astronomer's chief human resources officer, Kristin Cabot.
August 22, 2025	Morgan Wallen	Miranda Lambert; Corey Kent	I'm The Problem Tour			
August 23, 2025	Morgan Wallen	Miranda Lambert; Corey Kent	I'm The Problem Tour			
August 5, 2026	BTS		Arirang World Tour			
August 6, 2026	BTS		Arirang World Tour			
August 17, 2026	Usher; Chris Brown		The R&B Tour			
September 5, 2026	Bruno Mars	DJ Pee .Wee; Raye	The Romantic Tour			
September 6, 2026	Bruno Mars	DJ Pee .Wee; Raye	The Romantic Tour			
September 12, 2026	Karol G		Viajando Por El Mundo Tropitour			
September 25, 2026	Ed Sheeran		Loop Tour			Macklemore was removed as an opening act as Gillette Stadium and other venues would not allow him to perform. Lukas Graham and Aaron Rowe, who were also scheduled as opening acts for the shows at Gillette, would remove themselves from the tour in solidarity.Both shows were cancelled because of weather.
September 26, 2026	Ed Sheeran		Loop Tour			Macklemore was removed as an opening act as Gillette Stadium and other venues would not allow him to perform. Lukas Graham and Aaron Rowe, who were also scheduled as opening acts for the shows at Gillette, would remove themselves from the tour in solidarity.Both shows were cancelled because of weather.
October 2, 2026	Zach Bryan	Gregory Alan Isakov; Gabriella Rose	With Heaven On Tour			The Saturday show broke the attendance record for a concert.
October 3, 2026	Zach Bryan	Gregory Alan Isakov; Gabriella Rose	With Heaven On Tour	73,538		The Saturday show broke the attendance record for a concert.
May 1, 2027	Luke Combs					
August 10, 2027	Oasis	Richard Ashcroft				
August 13, 2027	Oasis	Richard Ashcroft				
August 14, 2027	Oasis	Richard Ashcroft				
August 27, 2027	Kenny Chesney	Eric Church Sheryl Crow				
August 28, 2027	Kenny Chesney	Eric Church Sheryl Crow				

=== Other events ===
The AMA Supercross Championship has been racing at Gillette Stadium since 2016.

Monster Jam has been coming to the stadium since 2014.

A Hall of Fame Induction Ceremony for former quarterback Tom Brady was hosted at Gillette Stadium on June 12, 2024.

The annual graduation ceremonies of Bridgewater State University are held at the stadium.

The Savannah Bananas played at Gillette August 28 and 29, 2026, vs the Loco Beach Coconuts as part of their 2026 Banana Ball Tour. Both shows sold out and included appearances from Hunter Henry who threw the first pitch for Fridays game.

== Playing surface ==
On November 14, 2006, two days after a rainstorm contributed to the deterioration of the grass surface in a Patriots game against the Jets, team management decided to replace the natural grass surface with a synthetic surface, FieldTurf. Normally, NFL rules insist that such work could only be done during the off-season; however, the grass field was in such poor condition, the league agreed to waive the rule. The entire job was done during a two-week road trip, with three shifts working around the clock. The Patriots' first game on the surface was a victory over the previously 9–1 Chicago Bears on November 26. Brady and his teammates commended the much-improved surface. At the conclusion of the 2007 season, Patriots quarterback Tom Brady had a career record of 31–3 on artificial turf. The team lost a preseason matchup in August 2007 to the Tennessee Titans on the new FieldTurf but otherwise won its first eleven regular-season and playoff games on the surface covering the period of November 2006 until September 2008, when the Patriots lost to the Miami Dolphins.

In February 2010, the surface was pulled and upgraded to FieldTurf "Duraspine Pro", which was expected to meet FIFA standards that the previous turf did not, preventing the team from having to place sod on top of their turf to host international soccer matches.

The surface was upgraded again in April 2014 to FieldTurf "Revolution" with "VersaTile" drainage system. The FieldTurf Revolution product is currently used at many venues across North America, including Lumen Field (home to the NFL's Seattle Seahawks and MLS's Seattle Sounders) and Providence Park, home of the MLS's Portland Timbers, where its installation was recently completed.

=== Field logo ===
When the field is configured for American football, the Patriots have their "Flying Elvis" logo (or "Pat Patriot" if they are wearing throwback uniforms) painted on the field at dead center of the 50-yard line. Prior to the 2022 season, the Gillette Stadium logo was painted on the field. This is a gray-and-blue stylized representation of the bridge and tower at the north entrance of the stadium. This logo was redone in time for the 2023 renovation project, but is no longer present on the field.

== Patriot Place ==
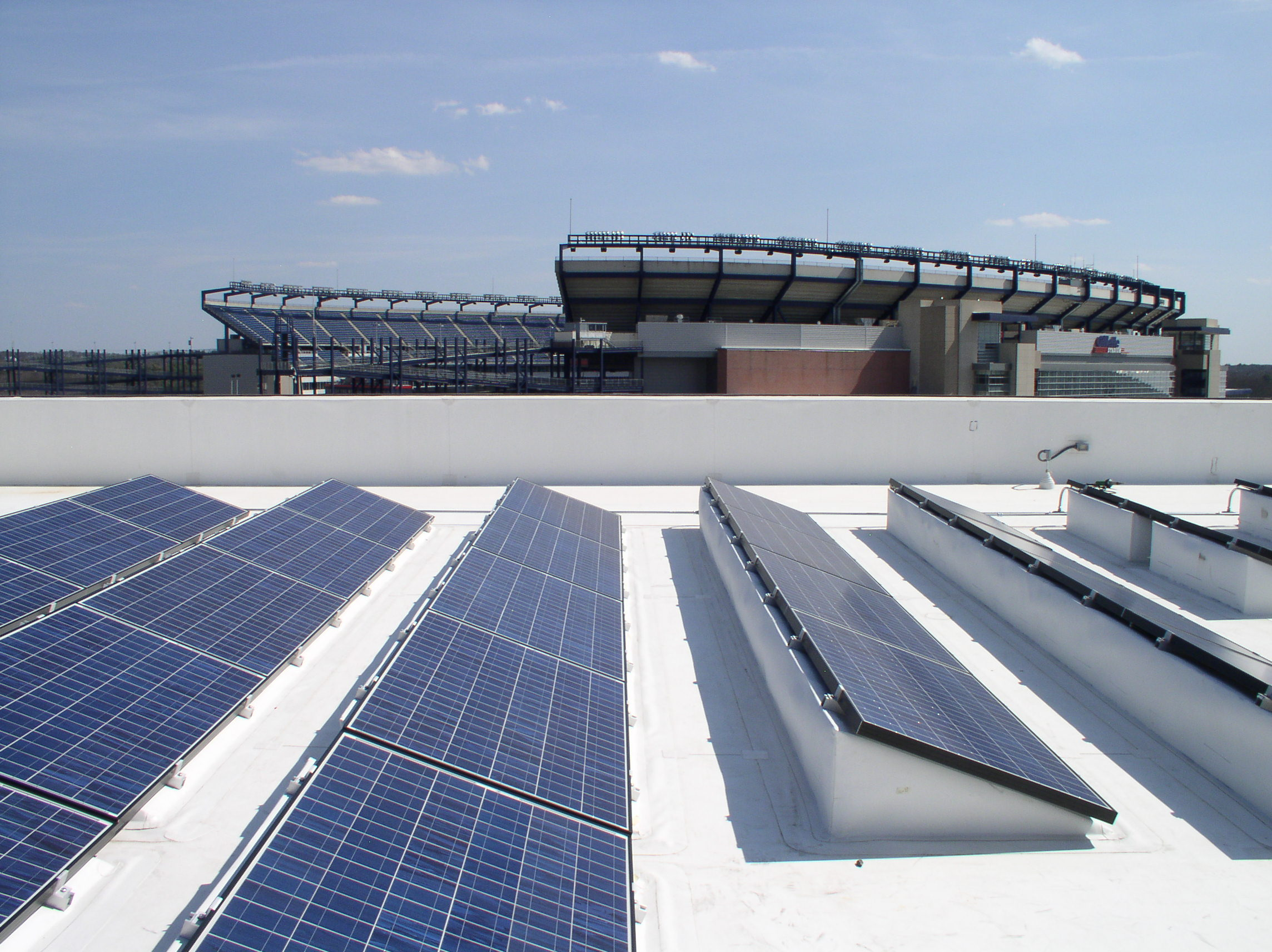
2009 Energy Project Award Winning 525 kilowatt BIPV CoolPly system on the Patriot Place Complex Adjacent to the Gillette Stadium in Foxborough. The Solar Project was built, and is owned and operated by Constellation Energy.

In 2006, the Patriots and Kraft announced plans to build a "super regional lifestyle and entertainment center" in the area around Gillette Stadium named Patriot Place. The cost of the project was $350 million, more than the cost to build Gillette Stadium itself; Kraft had purchased much of the surrounding land, about 700 acres (280 ha), when he bought Foxboro Stadium in the late 1980s.

The first phase of the project opened in fall of 2007, and featured the first Bass Pro Shops in New England, as well as Circuit City (now closed), Bed Bath & Beyond (now closed), Five Guys Burgers, Christmas Tree Shops (now closed), and Staples. In December 2007, the Patriots and CBS announced plans to build a themed restaurant and nightclub, named "CBS Scene" (now closed), at the site, which would also include studios for CBS-owned WBZ-TV. The restaurant was part of the second phase of the project, which included an open mall, a health center, a Cinema de Lux movie theater, a four-star Renaissance hotel, and the Patriots Hall of Fame. Attached to Gillette Stadium, the Hall includes a two-level interactive museum honoring the Patriots accomplishments and Super Bowl championships, plus the Patriots Pro Shop. The first restaurants and stores in phase two began opening in July 2008, and were followed by the openings of the Patriots Hall of Fame and the CBS Scene in time for the beginning of the 2008 New England Patriots season. More locations, including the health center and hotel, opened in 2009, along with additional sites in phase one.

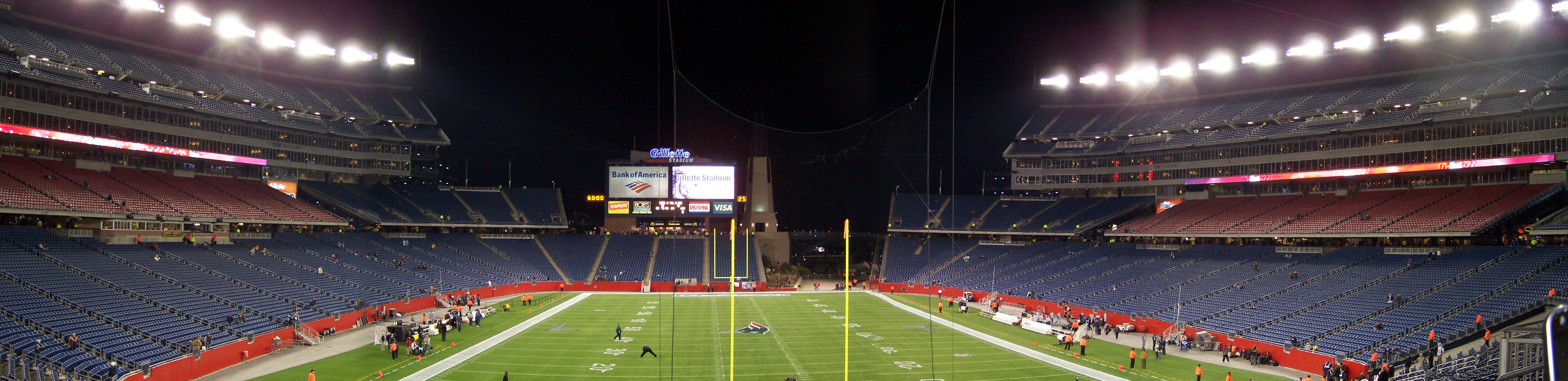
Panorama of Gillette Stadium, taken from the south end, in 2007. Many renovations have been made since.

== See also ==
- List of American football stadiums by capacity
- List of current NFL stadiums
- Lists of stadiums
- Statue of Tom Brady

== Sources ==
- Roberts, Randy (2005). The Rock, the Curse, and the Hub. Cambridge, Massachusetts: Harvard University Press. ISBN 978-0-674-01504-3.
- Foulds, Alan E. (2005). Boston's Ballparks & Arenas. University Press of New England. ISBN 978-1-58465-409-4.

Events and tenants
Preceded by Foxboro Stadium	Home of the New England Patriots; 2002 – present	Succeeded by current
Preceded by Foxboro Stadium	Home of the New England Revolution; 2002 – present	Succeeded by current
Preceded by Columbus Crew Stadium	Host of the MLS Cup; 2002	Succeeded by Home Depot Center
Preceded by Invesco Field at Mile High	Home of the Drum Corps International; World Championship; 2005	Succeeded by Camp Randall Stadium
Preceded by M&T Bank Stadium	Home of the NCAA Lacrosse Final Four; 2008–2009	Succeeded by M&T Bank Stadium
Preceded by Oakland Coliseum; RCA Dome; Heinz Field; Sports Authority Field at Mile High; Sports Authority Field at Mile High	Host of AFC Championship Game; 2004; 2008; 2012–2013; 2015; 2017–2018	Succeeded by Heinz Field; Heinz Field; Sports Authority Field at Mile High; Sports Authority Field at Mile High; Arrowhead Stadium
Preceded by Nationals Park	Host of the NHL Winter Classic; 2016	Succeeded by Busch Stadium
Preceded by first stadium	Home of the Boston Legacy FC 2026 – present	Succeeded by current
