= Miyu Shirako =

Japanese rugby sevens player

Miyu Shojima
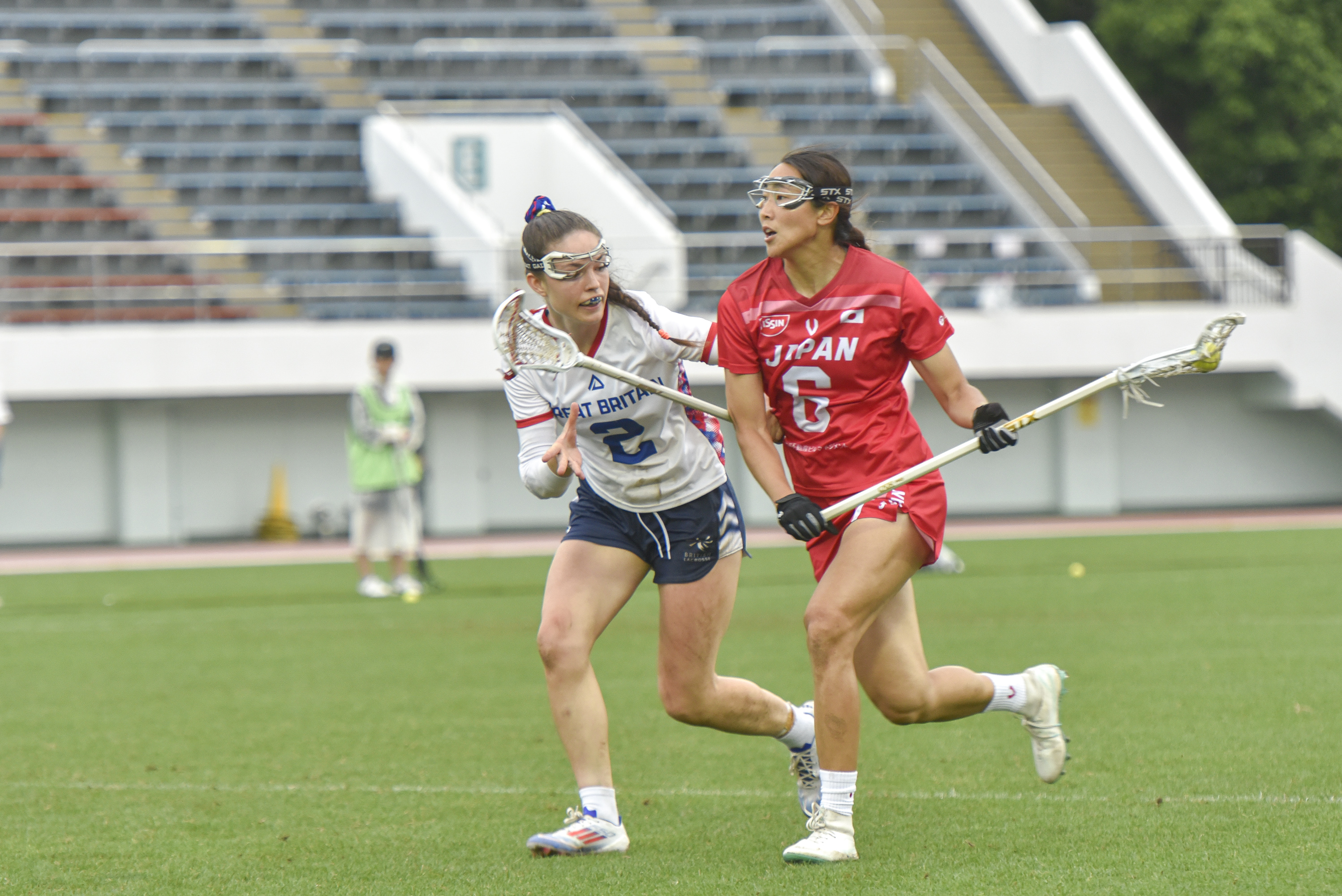
- Shojima playing for the Japanese women's national lacrosse team.
- Born: 22 July 1995 (age 31) Tokyo, Japan
- Height: 174 cm (5 ft 9 in)
- Weight: 68 kg (150 lb; 10 st 10 lb)

Rugby union career
- Position(s): Prop, Wing
Senior career
Years	Team	Apps	(Points)
2020–2024	Nanairo Prism Fukuoka		
National sevens team
Years	Team		Comps
2019–2024	Japan 7s		

Miyu Shojima (庄島未祐 , Shojima Miyū, formerly 白子未祐 Shirako Miyū, born 22 July 1995) is a Japanese lacrosse player. She is a former rugby sevens player who competed at the 2020 Summer Olympics.

== Early life ==
Shojima played basketball from elementary school through to high school.

== Lacrosse career ==
Shojima was selected for the Japanese women's Under-22 national team that won the Asia-Pacific tournament in 2017, she was named MVP of the tournament.

In 2018, she was selected as a training player for the All Japan Women's Lacrosse team. She featured in an international friendly match against England and was named MVP of the match.

In 2019, she was drafted by the New England Command of the American Women's Professional Lacrosse League, but declined the offer to pursue a career in rugby sevens.

Shojima returned to lacrosse in October 2024. She joined the NeO Lacrosse Club in June 2025. She was invited to the Japan women's national lacrosse team trials. On 14 June, she participated in the second match of the 31st International Lacrosse Friendly against Great Britain.

== Rugby sevens career ==
Shojima switched to play rugby sevens in 2019. She joined Nanairo Prism Fukuoka in 2020.

She represented Japan at the delayed 2020 Summer Olympics. In 2024, she announced her departure from Nanairo Prism Fukuoka and her retirement from rugby sevens.

== Personal life ==
She is married to Gyo Shojima who is former professional American football player.
