= Baltimore Ride =

American lacrosse team

- Founded: 2016
- League: United Women's Lacrosse League
- Based in: Baltimore, Maryland
- Colors: Purple, Black, Metallic Gold
- Head coach: Jen Adams
- General manager: Krystin Porcella
- Website: Baltimore Ride

The Baltimore Ride were a United Women's Lacrosse League (UWLX) professional women's field lacrosse team based in Baltimore, Maryland. They played in the UWLX since the 2016 season. In the 2016 season, the four teams in the UWLX played in a barnstorming format, with all four teams playing at a single venue.

== Franchise History ==
The Baltimore Ride was one of the original four teams of the United Women's Lacrosse League (MLL). UWLX was founded by Digit Murphy and Aronda Kirby in a strategic partnership with STX. On February 23, 2016, Colleen Shearer was named as the first general manager in franchise history. On March 17, 2016, Jen Adams was announced as the Ride's first head coach.

The first game in franchise history took place on May 28, 2016 at Goodman Stadium at Lehigh University in Bethlehem, Pennsylvania. Opposing the Long Island Storm, Baltimore lost by a 13–12 mark. The team's first-ever goal was scored by Beth Glaros, with Courtney Swan logging the assist. Glaros would finish the game with four goals to compile the first four-goal performance in franchise history.

In the Ride’s second game, a 17–16 loss to the Boston Storm, Alex Aust set a league record and team record for most goals in a game. She would score a hat trick in the first and second half of the game, logging six goals overall.

=== Draft history ===
The following represented the Ride’s inaugural draft class. Of note, Katie Schwarzmann would be the first ever player selected in the history of the UWLX Draft, taken by the Ride with the top pick. Later in the draft, Dana Dobbie would be the first Canadian-born player selected in draft history.

Pick	Player	Position	Nationality	College
1	Katie Schwarzmann	Midfielder	United States	Maryland
2	Alex Aust	Attacker	United States	Maryland
3	Kristen Carr	Defender	United States	North Carolina
4	Brooke Griffin	Attacker	United States	Maryland
5	Allyson Carey	Midfielder	United States	Vanderbilt
6	Morgan Stephens	Defender	United States	Virginia
7	Courtney Swan	Attacker	United States	Virginia
8	Dana Dobbie	Attacker	Canada	Maryland
9	Beth Glaros	Midfielder	United States	Maryland
10	Sam Farrell	Defender	United States	Florida
11	Kitty Cullen	Attack	United States	Florida
12	Corinne Gandolfi-Unterstein	Midfielder	United States	Hofstra
13	Crysti Foote	Attack	United States	Notre Dame
14	Frankie Caridi	Goalie	United States	Stony Brook
15	Kerry Stoothoff	Goalie	United States	Loyola
16	Alyssa Fleming	Defender	United States	Stony Brook
17	Maddie Lesher	Defender	United States	Loyola
18	Amanda Johansen	Midfielder	United States	USC
19	Mallory Frysinger	Defense	United States	North Carolina
20	Erica Bodt	Midfielder	United States	Syracuse
21	Taylor Cummings	Midfielder	United States	Maryland

== Roster ==
NUMBER	NAME	POSITION	HOMETOWN	COLLEGE
30	Kerry Stoothoff	Goalie	Blue Point, NY	Loyola
4	Awehiyo Thomas	Attack	Siz Nations, Ont.	Syracuse
19	Meg Bartley	Attack	Washington, DC	Virginia Tech
20	Haley Warden	Midfield	Glen Mills, PA	James Madison
13	Molly Hulseman	Attack	Fairfield, CT	Loyola
27	Brittany Poist	Defense	Hampstead, MD	Maryland
34	Michaela Duranti	Midfield	Farmingdale, NY	Towson
15	Faye Brust	Attack	Bel Air, MD	Louisville
33	Maggie Auslander	Defense	Cary, NC	North Carolina
23	Taylor Virden	Defense	Ellicott City, MD	Duke
10	Nicole Beatson	Attack	Skaneateles, NY	Winthrop
32	Sam Maguire	Midfield	Bel Air, MD	Stetson
5	Brittain Altomare	Attack	Wolfsville, MD	Hofstra
21	Molly Cobb	Midfield	Towson, MD	Notre Dame
2	Claudia Flister	Defense	Catonsville, MD	Johns Hopkins
24	Kristine Loscalzo	Attack	Miller Place, NY	Virginia Tech
26	Rachel Vallerelli	Goalie	Hartsdale, NY	UMass
25	Allison LaBeau	Attack	Mountain Lakes, NJ	Lehigh
22	Meghan Macera	Midfield	Westminster, MD	Virginia Tech
29	Brittney Orashen	Midfield	Jacksonville Beach, FL	Jacksonville
9	Nikki Boltja	Attack	Medina, OH	Louisville
8	Erica Bodt	Midfield	Forest Hill, MD	Syracuse
7	Emma Schait	Midfield	Seaford, NY	Stony Brook

== See also ==
- Women's Professional Lacrosse League
- Major League Lacrosse, the professional men's field lacrosse league in North America
- National Lacrosse League, the professional men's box lacrosse league in North America
- List of professional sports teams in the United States and Canada
