= 2019 WPLL season =

- League: Women's Professional Lacrosse League
- Sport: Women's lacrosse
- Teams: 5
- Top scorer: Dana Dobbie, Marie McCool, Kylie Ohlmiller, Halle Majorana
- Finals champions: Brave

WPLL seasons
- ← 2018

The 2019 Women's Professional Lacrosse League season is the 2nd season of Women's Professional Lacrosse League.

== Regular season standings ==
Team	Games	Wins	Losses
New York Fight	3	3	0
Baltimore Brave	3	2	1
Upstate Pride	3	2	1
New England Command	4	1	3
Philadelphia Fire	3	0	3

== Schedule ==
Week	Date(s)	Winner	Score	Loser	Venue	City	Ref.
1	June 1	Command	11-8	Fire	Gillette Stadium	Boston, MA	
1	June 2	Fight	6-4	Pride	Gillette Stadium	Boston, MA	
2	June 14	Fight	15-12	Brave	River City Sports Complex	Richmond, VA	
2	June 15	Pride	18-5	Command	River City Sports Complex	Richmond, VA	
3	June 23	Brave	19-9	Fire	Homewood Field	Baltimore, MD	
3	June 24	Fight	16-9	Command	Homewood Field	Baltimore, MD	
-	July 6	Postponed			TBA	Philadelphia, PA	
4	July 13	Brave	13-9	Command	Ridley Athletic Complex	Baltimore, MD	
4	July 13	Pride	16-12	Fire	Ridley Athletic Complex	Baltimore, MD	
5	July 20	Pride	(cancelled)	Brave	James M. Shuart Stadium	Long Island, NY	
5	July 20	Fight	(cancelled)	Fire	James M. Shuart Stadium	Long Island, NY	
Semis	July 26	Fight	13-10	Command	Reese Stadium	New Haven, CT	
Semis	July 26	Brave	15-10	Pride	Reese Stadium	New Haven, CT	
Final	July 28	Brave	13-12	Fight	US Lacrosse Headquarters	Sparks, MD	

== League Leaders ==
- Goals: (4 tied) 8: Dana Dobbie, Marie McCool, Kylie Ohlmiller, Halle Majorana
- Assists: (2 tied) 6: Hannah Nielsen, Dempsey Arsenault
- Points: (2 tied) 13: Hannah Nielsen, Dempsey Arsenault
- Saves: 26: Gussie Johns
- Ground balls: 12: Dempsey Arsenault
