= Dana Dobbie =

Canadian lacrosse player and coach

Dana Dobbie (born September 30, 1984) is a Canadian women's lacrosse player and coach. Having played with the Maryland Terrapins at the collegiate level, she has also competed with the Canadian national team, winning the silver medal at the 2013 FIL World Cup. In 2016, she was selected by the Baltimore Ride as their first-ever selection in the inaugural United Women's Lacrosse League Draft. She also coaches at Loyola University.

== Playing career ==
=== NCAA ===
Having originally competed with Ohio University, she would register 34 goals in her freshman campaign. The following season (2005), she would improve on her total with 37 goals for the Bobcats. As a freshman, she had sprained both of her ankles, and discovered that by the end of the 2005 season, she has actually been playing with torn ligaments. After two reconstructive surgeries, she was a redshirt in 2006.

Transferring to the Maryland Terrapins in 2007, she would graduate from the program in 2008 as the NCAA's all-time leader in draw controls, gaining a record 334. In addition, she would set the NCAA single-season record for draw controls with 126 during the 2008 campaign.

Of note, Dobbie was the first Canadian to win the Atlantic Coast Conference Player of the Year Award. Along with Jen Adams and Katie Chrest, she became the third Terrapin to win the award twice. She would also lead the ACC as a senior with 70 goals.

=== Canadian National team ===
Raised in Fergus, Ontario, Dobbie served as the captain of the 2003 Canadian Junior U-19 team, winning a bronze medal at the U19 World Championships. With the senior team, Dobbie would capture a bronze medal in the aftermath of the 2009 FIL World Cup. She would follow it up four years later with a silver medal, the greatest showing for a Canadian team in World Cup history. With the 2013 FIL Women's World Cup hosted in Oshawa, Ontario, Canada, she would score four goals in the semifinals, an 11-7 win against Australia, advancing to the gold-medal game. For her efforts, Dobbie was named to the 2013 World Cup All-World Team.

=== UWLX ===
Drafted by the Baltimore Ride with their eighth pick overall in the United Women's Lacrosse League, Dobbie was reunited with Jen Adams, her former coach at Maryland. Of note, Adams was named head coach of the Baltimore franchise. Dobbie would finish the inaugural UWLX season as the regular season scoring champion, culminating with a nod to the league's All-Star Team.

=== WPLL ===
Dobbie joined the Women's Professional Lacrosse League for their inaugural season in 2018 as a member of the Baltimore Brave. She tied for the league lead in goals with 8.

== Coaching career ==
In 2009, Dobbie joined former Maryland assistant coach Jen Adams on the Loyola Greyhounds coaching staff. During their time as coaches with the program, the Loyola Greyhounds would win consecutive Big East crowns in 2011 and 2012 along with a Patriot League championship.

== Awards and honors ==
- 2004, 2005 All-ALC honoree for the Bobcats
- 2005 WomensLacrosse.com Freshman All-America Team laurels.
- 2007 and 2008 All-American
- 2007 and 2008Tewaaraton Trophy finalist
- 2007 and 2008Atlantic Coast Conference Player of the Year
- 2008 IWLCA Midfielder of the Year
- 2013 FIL World Cup All-World Team
- 2016 UWLX Regular Season Scoring Champion
- 2016 UWLX All-Star Selection

== Personal ==
Dobbie and Jen Adams are both owners of Seven Lacrosse Training .
