= Philadelphia Fire =

Women's Professional Lacrosse League team

Fire
- Founded: 2018
- First season: 2018 WPLL season
- Disbanded: 2020
- Last season: 2019 WPLL season
- League: Women's Professional Lacrosse League
- Based in: Philadelphia, Pennsylvania
- Head coach: Ricky Fried
- General manager: Amy Bokker
- Website: Philadelphia Fire

The Fire was a Women's Professional Lacrosse League (WPLL) professional women's field lacrosse team based in Philadelphia, Pennsylvania. They have played in the WPLL since the 2018 season. In the 2018 season, the five teams in the WPLL played in a barnstorming format, with all five teams playing at a single venue.

After cancelling the 2020 season in April due to the COVID-19 pandemic, the league announced on August 6, 2020, that it would be closing down.

== Roster ==
NUMBER	NAME	POSITION	COLLEGE
2	Abbie Burgess	M	Team Australia
3	Gussie Johns	GK	USC
5	Aly Messinger	A	UNC
6	Morgan Stephens	D	University of Virginia
7	Hannah Nielsen	A	Northwestern University
8	Katrina Geiger	M	Loyola University Maryland
11	Spring Sanders	D	Northwestern
15	Lauren Kahn	M	UConn
21	Caroline Margolis	M	Boston College
22	Shannon Fitzgerald	A	Johns Hopkins University
26	Maddy Lesher	D	Loyola University Maryland
28	Courtney Waite	D	University of North Carolina
30	Amanda Leavell	D	Princeton University
33	Maddie Crutchfield	M	Duke University
35	Michelle Tumolo	A	Syracuse
37	Katie Haus	M	University of Maryland
38	Haley Schweizer	M	Johns Hopkins University
42	Frankie Kamely	A	Loyola University Maryland
43	Caylee Waters	GK	UNC
44	Kelyn Freedman	M	Georgetown University
77	Sheila Nesselbush	A	Northwestern University

== 2018 season ==
Date	Opponent	Home/Away	Result	Score
06/02/2018	Baltimore Brave	Away	L	12-20
06/09/2018	Upstate Pride	Home	L	10-15
06/28/2018	New England Command	Away	L	11-12
07/06/2018	New York Fight	Neutral	L	10-19
