= Alyssa Fleming =

American women's lacrosse player

Personal information
- Nationality: USA
- Born: March 8, 1994 (age 32) New York, USA
- Height: 5 ft 9 in (175 cm)

Sport
- Position: Defense
- Shoots: Left/Right
- NCAA team: Stony Brook Seawolves
- Pro career: 2016–

Alyssa Fleming (born March 8, 1994) is an American women's lacrosse player. Having played with the Stony Brook Seawolves at the collegiate level, she was signed to the Baltimore Ride of the United Women's Lacrosse League.

== Sporting career ==
=== High school ===
Fleming played four years of varsity lacrosse at Shoreham-Wading River High School and was named All-Tourney in 2009, All-Country in 2010, and All-American and All-Country in 2012. She led the team to State Championships in 2009, 2010, and 2012.

=== College ===
In college, Fleming was a Synapse Sports All-Rookie in 2013 and named to the All-America East second team. She was selected to the American East all-rookie squad and started all 19 games. In 2014, she was on the first team All-American East, and second team All-Mid Atlantic, starting 21 games and leading the team with 55 ground balls (the third-most in a single-season in school history). In 2015, she was on the first team All-America East. She received an Inside Lacrosse honorable mention preseason All-American and was Inside Lacrosse third-team mid-season All-American. In 2016, she was selected as an IWLCA (Intercollegiate Women's Lacrosse Coaches Association) third-team All-American and IWLCA Mid-Atlantic all-region first team. She was named America East co-defensive player-of-the-year.

=== UWLX ===
After graduating from Stony Brook, Fleming joined the Baltimore Ride during the 2016 UWLX season. She made her debut on May 28, 2016, as the Ride lost to the Long Island Sound by a score of 13–12.
