= United Women's Sports =

- Company type: LLC
- Industry: Professional sports
- Founded: (2016)
- Founder: Digit Murphy; Aronda Kirby
- Headquarters: Providence, Rhode Island, United States
- Area served: New England, Maryland, New York State, Pennsylvania
- Key people: Digit Murphy, President and CEO; Aronda Kirby, COO; Michele Dejulius, UWLX Commissioner
- Products: Professional sports teams
- Owner: Digit Murphy Enterprises
- Subsidiaries: UWLX; Play It Forward Foundation
- Website: www.unitedwomenssports.com www.playitforwardsport.org

United Women's Sports LLC (UWS) is an American professional sports company based in Providence, Rhode Island. Operating women's professional sports leagues as a financially sustainable sports entertainment product, UWS works toward raising awareness of women in sport.

The business model for UWS is based on the objective of Play It Forward Sports, which was founded in 2015, aiming to create female leaders through sport. Such goals include providing opportunities for women to work in sports, including disciplines such as Marketing, On-Air, Production, Operations and Finance. Operating expenses for UWS includes administration, player salaries, facilities, game operations, travel/lodging and insurance, among others.

== Properties ==
Founded by Digit Murphy and Aronda Kirby in 2016, the first venture of UWS involved lacrosse, with the launch of UWLX, its inaugural game took place on May 28, 2016. The flagship season culminated with the Long Island Sound capturing the league championship.

=== Play It Forward Foundation ===
In addition to the UWLX, Murphy and Kirby are co-founders of the Play It Forward Sports Foundation, with the goal of advancing gender equity in sports at all levels of play.

With the objective of providing more opportunities for women in sport as professional athletes, coaches and managers, the model for Play It Forward Sports also allows female athletes a chance to participate in the community by educating, training and mentoring young female athletes, providing them with earning potential.

Among their initiatives included an initiative with Eyekonz. Founded by Jazmine Smith, with the goal of introducing African-American girls to lacrosse, the initiative saw the UWLX run a free clinic for members of Philadelphia's Strawberry Mansion high school lacrosse team following a UWLX regular season game.

Athlete ambassadors for Play It Forward include Molly Schaus, along with tennis players Neha Uberoi and Shikha Uberoi. In addition, Schaus is part of the Foundation's Board, which includes Valarie Gelb, Debbie Mckay and John Mayers.

During March 2016, it was announced that Play It Forward Sport would support a new girls' hockey development program launched by the New York Islanders at their practice facility, the Northwell Health Ice Center. Said program shall include working with players 12 and under, while another shall involve an Under-14 and Under-16 years of age program.
