= Digit Murphy =

American ice hockey coach and administrator

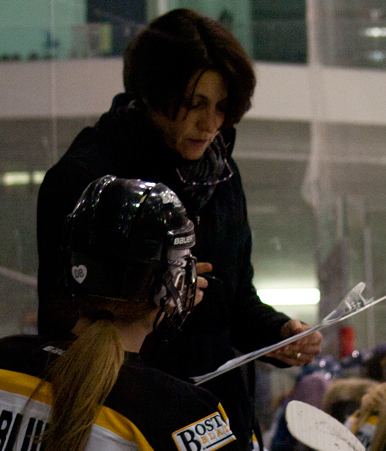
- Murphy in 2015
- Born: December 7, 1961 (age 64) Cranston, Rhode Island, U.S.
- Position: Centre
- Played for: Cornell Big Red
- Coached for: Brown Bears; Boston Blades; Kunlun Red Star WIH; Toronto Six
- Playing career: 1979–1983
- Coaching career: 1987–present
- Website: digitmurphyathletics.com

Margaret Pearl "Digit" Murphy (née Degidio; born December 7, 1961) is an American ice hockey coach, administrator, and former college ice hockey player. She is president of the Metropolitan Riveters of the Premier Hockey Federation (PHF).

Murphy has served as head coach of the Boston Blades, with whom she won two Clarkson Cups, and Kunlun Red Star WIH in the Canadian Women's Hockey League (CWHL). She served as both head coach and president of the Toronto Six in the NWHL during the team’s inaugural season. Prior to joining the Blades, she was the head coach of the Brown Bears women's ice hockey program. She became the winningest coach in NCAA Division I women's ice hockey history during her 18th season at Brown (2006–07). She finished her NCAA coaching career with 318 wins.

== Playing career ==
Murphy had a standout career as a student athlete at Cornell University during 1979 to 1983. She was a four-year letter winner for the Cornell Big Red women's ice hockey team and was a Big Red alternate captain as a junior and the team captain as a senior. In 1981, she was named Ivy League Player of the Year and finished her career with 123 goals and 90 assists. She was inducted into the Cornell Athletic Hall of Fame in 1994 and the women's hockey Most Valuable Player Award at Cornell is named after her.

Murphy was inducted in the Scholar-Athlete Hall of Fame at the Institute for International Sport in South Kingstown, Rhode Island.

== Coaching career ==
=== Brown Bears ===
Murphy had winning percentages of .500 or better in fourteen of her eighteen seasons as head coach at Brown. During the 2006–07 season, a 3–1 victory over Boston University made Murphy the most victorious coach in Division I women's hockey history. With the win, she passed former Providence and Yale coach John Marchetti. In the same season, the Bears beat Union, 6-0 for the 300th win of her career.

In 2010, Murphy applied for the Brown Bears men's ice hockey head coaching position. Brown ultimately offered the position to Brendan Whittet, who had no history of NCAA head coaching experience at the time, over Murphy.

During her time at Brown, Murphy coached the Bears to six ECAC Hockey titles and five Ivy League titles. In addition, Murphy's players included one Patty Kazmaier Award winner, three AHCA All-Americans, and seven Olympians, including three-time gold medalist Becky Kellar. As a side note, Amanda Asay, who competed for Murphy from 2006–09, was a participant in the inaugural women's baseball tournament at the 2015 Pan American Games. Murphy was the first female coach named to Brown's Wall of Honor.

=== CWHL ===
For the 2012–13 CWHL season, Murphy served as both head coach and general manager of the Boston Blades. She led the franchise to the 2013 Clarkson Cup and 2015 Clarkson Cup championships, along with an appearance in the finals of the 2014 Clarkson Cup. Murphy was named the 2013 CWHL Coach of the Year and was credited as the winning coach for Team Red in the inaugural 1st Canadian Women's Hockey League All-Star Game.

During her second season with the Blades, she was recognized with the Women's Ice Hockey Founders Award, leading the Blades to the best regular season record in league play. Her time with the Blades involved becoming the first American-born coach to win two Clarkson Cup titles, and becoming the first coach to lead a US-based team to two Cup wins.

On February 27, 2017, Murphy was named as the chief coach for the HC Kunlun Red Star women's team, known as Kunlun Red Star WIH that competed as a member of the CWHL, signaling her return to the CWHL for the 2017–18 season. Serving as the head coach of the Kunlun Red Star WIH franchise, one of two expansion teams in China, the club featured goaltender Noora Räty and forward Kelli Stack, who played for Murphy with the Blades. Räty became the first European goaltender to win the CWHL Goaltender of the Year Award, while Stack became the first American-born player to capture the Angela James Bowl, awarded to the CWHL's leading scorer. By season's end, the Red Star qualified for the 2018 Clarkson Cup championship game, which they lost to the Markham Thunder. She left Kunlun Red Star in May 2018.

=== NWHL/PHF ===
On April 22, 2020, Murphy was named president of the National Women's Hockey League's (NWHL) first Canadian expansion franchise, the Toronto Six. On October 20, 2020, Murphy was named first head coach in franchise history. With a coaching staff that included Lisa Haley, Murphy led the Six to a first place finish during the 2020–21 NWHL season, highlighted by a four-game winning streak. Following the season, she stepped down as coach to focus on her role as president of the Six. On May 5, 2022, Murphy joined the Metropolitan Riveters as their new team president.

=== International ===
On numerous occasions, Murphy has been involved with USA Hockey. She coached the U.S. national team at the Lake Placid Olympic Festival in 2004. She was an assistant at the 1992 IIHF Women's World Championship and the 1996 Three Nations Cup. In addition, she was a member of the 1998 Olympic Selection Committee.

Murphy was part of the International Ice Hockey Federation (IIHF) Ambassador and Mentorship Program, working with Rick Polutnik as a coach-mentor for the Slovak women's national ice hockey team.

While in China coaching Kunlun Red Star WIH during the 2017–18 season, Murphy also served as head coach to the Chinese women's national team and the women's national under-18 team. Under Murphy's leadership, China placed fifth of six at the 2018 World Championship Division 1B tournament and China U18 placed fourth of six at the 2018 IIHF World Women's U18 Championship Division 1B tournament.

In August 2019, Murphy served as the head coach of Team Americas at the 2019 Aurora Games.

== Play It Forward Sport Foundation ==
Murphy and her partner, Aronda Kirby, former general manager with the Boston Blades, established the Play It Forward Sport Foundation, which works towards gender equity at all levels of sport with a focus on creating leaders through participation in women's sport. The first annual Play It Forward Girls Sports Festival was held in August 2015 in Rochester, New York. In addition to Murphy and Kirby, the inaugural Play It Forward Sport Foundation's leadership group comprised Valarie Gelb, Debbie McKay, John Mayers, and Olympic silver medalist and Clarkson Cup champion Molly Schaus. As of 2021, the foundation's advisory board includes Gelb, Kirby, McKay, Murphy, and two additions in former Cornell Big Red captain Sue Fulshaw and Eyekonz Field Hockey and Lacrosse founder Jazmine A Smith.

=== United Women's Sports ===
Founded by Murphy in 2016, United Women's Sports (UWS) is an American professional sports company based in Providence, Rhode Island, formed with the primary objective of establishing women’s professional sport leagues for a variety of sports. The company focuses on increasing female participation in all areas of sport and on creating opportunities for women to work in disciplines including marketing, broadcasting and on-air, production, operations and finance as they relate to women's sport.

==== UWLX ====
In 2015, Murphy and Kirby founded the United Women's Lacrosse League (UWLX) under the ownership of United Women's Sports, the first professional women's lacrosse league in the United States. The league saw year over year growth in the first two seasons, 2016 and 2017, and was able to offer stipends to players in the second season. When Murphy accepted the head coaching position with Kunlun Red Star WIH for the 2017–18 CWHL season, operation of the UWLX was transferred entirely to 3d Lacrosse. After the third UWLX season in 2018, the league appeared to cease operations and no additional seasons have been organized. Though no official statement was ever released by the league, it has been speculated that the league ending may have been caused in part by the splitting of the market due to the establishment of the Women's Professional Lacrosse League (WPLL) in 2017.

== Other ==
During the 1998 Nagano Winter Games, Murphy worked as a broadcaster, becoming the first American female color analyst for a women's hockey game broadcast on television.

In 2001, Murphy was the co-founder of the RI IXpress Select Tier 1 Program, the first elite level girls' hockey program in the state of Rhode Island.

== Personal life ==
Murphy was born on Pearl Harbor Remembrance Day and her given name, Margaret Pearl, honors the event – Margaret also means "pearl."

She graduated from Cornell in 1983 with a BBA and worked in logistics for the computer company Data General for several years thereafter. During a staff reduction at Data General, she accepted a buy out offer and began studying at the University of Rhode Island to become a physical education teacher before joining the Brown Bears women's program as an assistant coach in 1987.

Murphy married Ken Murphy in 1990 and they had four children together.

In 2002, Murphy came out as lesbian and divorced her husband after meeting and falling in love with Aronda Kirby. Murphy and Kirby moved in to their home in Providence where they went on to raise their six children – Murphy's four children and Kirby's two children from their previous marriages – together.

== Coaching record ==
=== NCAA ===
Year	Wins	Losses	Ties	Postseason
1989–90	9	11	2	
1990–91	8	11	0	
1991–92	10	11	0	
1992–93	15	8	1	
1993–94	16	5	0	
1994–95	16	4	3	ECAC regular season championship
1995–96	16	4	5	ECAC regular season championship
1996–97	28	2	1	ECAC regular season championship
1997–98	22	7	4	ECAC tournament championship, AWCHA Championship loss
1998–99	20	7	4	
1999–00	25	4	3	ECAC tournament championship, AWCHA Championship loss
2000–01	19	7	3	
2001–02	25	8	2	2002 NCAA Championship runner-up
2002–03	14	14	4	
2003–04	18	11	2	
2004–05	15	15	2	
2005–06	15	13	5	
2006–07	10	17	2	
2007–08	5	19	5	
2008–09	7	21	1	
2009–10	3	21	4	
2010–11	2	23	4	
Career	274	224	57	

=== CWHL ===
Season	Team	W	L	OTL	Pts	Pct.	Rank	Postseason
2012–13	Boston Blades	19	4	1	39	.813	1st	2013 Clarkson Cup champions
2013–14	Boston Blades	13	11	0	26	.542	2nd	2014 Clarkson Cup finalists
2014–15	Boston Blades	17	6	1	35	.729	1st	2015 Clarkson Cup champions
2017–18	Kunlun Red Star WIH	21	6	1	43	.767	2nd	2018 Clarkson Cup finalists
Career		70	27	3	143			

=== NWHL ===
Season	Team	GP	W	L	OTL	PTS	Pts%	GF	GA	Rank	Postseason
2020–21	Toronto Six	6	4	1	1	9	.750	21	14	1st	Lost semifinal game

== Awards and honors ==
- Brown Bears Wall of Honor
- 1981 Ivy League Co-Player of the Year
- 1994 Cornell University's Athletic Hall of Fame
- 1997 ECAC/KOHO Coach of the Year
- 1997 New England Hockey Writers' Coach of the Year
- 2004 International Scholar Athlete Hall of Fame
- 2013 Canadian Women's Hockey League Coach of the Year.
- 2014 Women's Ice Hockey Founders Award
- 2015 Honoree, Forty Over 40
- 2019 Inductee of the Rhode Island Hockey Hall of Fame

== See also ==
- List of college women's ice hockey career coaching wins leaders
