= New England Command =

Women's field lacrosse team

Command
- Founded: 2018
- First season: 2018 WPLL season
- Disbanded: 2020
- Last season: 2019 WPLL season
- League: Women's Professional Lacrosse League
- Team history: New England Command; 2018; Command; 2019—2020
- Based in: Boston, Massachusetts
- Head coach: Amy Patton
- General manager: Alice Lee
- Website: New England Command

The Command was a Women's Professional Lacrosse League (WPLL) professional women's field lacrosse team. They have played in the WPLL since the 2018 season. In the 2018 season, the five teams in the WPLL played in a barnstorming format, with all five teams playing at a single venue, and the Command were the inaugural champions.

After cancelling the 2020 season in April due to the COVID-19 pandemic, the league announced on August 6, 2020, that it would be closing down.

== Roster ==
| NUMBER | NAME | POSITION | COLLEGE |
|---|---|---|---|
| 99 | Emily Leitner | GK | University of Pennsylvania |
| 81 | Sarah Martin | A | University of Albany |
| 63 | Kierra Sweeney | A | Dartmouth College |
| 34 | Casey Pearsall | M | University of Notre Dame |
| 33 | Becca Block | D | Syracuse University |
| 31 | Bailey Mathis | D | Loyola University Maryland |
| 29 | Megan Douty | D | University of Maryland |
| 28 | Bridget Bianco | GK | Northwestern University |
| 25 | Katie Hertsch | D | Hofstra University |
| 24 | Sarah Lloyd | M | Princeton University |
| 23 | Steph Lazo | A | Penn State University |
| 21 | Kristin Igoe | M | Boston College |
| 20 | Taylor Hensh | A | University of Maryland |
| 18 | Taryn VanThof | M | Loyola University Maryland |
| 16 | Olivia Jenner | A | Duke University |
| 15 | Tanner Guarino | M | UMass Amherst |
| 14 | Ela Hazar | A | University of North Carolina |
| 12 | Kasey Behr | M | University of Virginia |
| 9 | Gabby Capuzzi | M | Ohio State University |
| 8 | Kara Mupo | A | Northwestern University |
| 6 | Izzy Nixon | A | Yale University |
| 5 | Katie O'Donnell | M | Penn State University |
| 4 | Kenzie Kent | A | Boston College |

== 2018 season ==
| Date | Opponent | Home/Away | Result | Score |
|---|---|---|---|---|
| June 2 | New York Fight | Neutral | W | 13-10 |
| June 9 | Baltimore Brave | Away | L | 6-15 |
| June 24 | Upstate Pride | Away | W | 11-10 (OT) |
| June 28 | Philadelphia Fire | Home | W | 12-11 |

== 2019 season ==
| Date | Opponent | Home/Away | Venue | Result | Score |
|---|---|---|---|---|---|
| June 1 | Philadelphia Fire | Home | Gillette Stadium, Foxboro, MA | W | 11-8 |
| June 15 | Upstate Pride | Neutral | River City Sports Complex, Richmond, VA | L | 5-18 |
| June 24 | New York Fight | Neutral | Homewood Field, Baltimore, MD | L | 5-16 |
| July 13 | Baltimore Brave | Away | Ridley Athletic Complex, Baltimore, MD | L | 9-13 |
