= Upstate Pride =

Field lacrosse team in New York, US

Pride
- Founded: 2018
- First season: 2018 WPLL season
- Disbanded: 2020
- Last season: 2019 WPLL season
- League: Women's Professional Lacrosse League
- Based in: Albany, New York
- Head coach: Katie Rowan
- General manager: Laura Field
- Website: Upstate Pride

The Pride was a Women's Professional Lacrosse League (WPLL) professional women's field lacrosse team based in Albany, New York. They have played in the WPLL since the 2018 season. In the 2018 season, the five teams in the WPLL played on a barnstorming format, with all five teams playing at a single venue.

After cancelling the 2020 season in April due to the COVID-19 pandemic, the league announced on August 6, 2020, that it would be closing down.

== Roster ==
NUMBER	NAME	POSITION	COLLEGE
3	Danielle Etrasco	A	Boston University
6	Kristen Carr	D	University of North Carolina
7	Shayna Pirecca	A	University of Florida
10	Alex Aust	A	University of Maryland
13	Sammy Jo Tracy	A	University of North Carolina
14	Nadine Hadnagy	D	University of Maryland
16	Molly Hulseman	M	Loyola University (MD)
17	Mollie Stevens	A/M	University of Florida
19	Katie Kerrigan	A	James Madison University
20	Lydia Sutton	D	University of Southern California
22	Olivia Hompe	A	Princeton University
23	Lauren Murray	D	Northwestern University
25	Haley Warden	M	James Madison University
28	Elena Romesburg	M	James Madison University
30	Molly Wolf	GK	Loyola University (MD)
32	Ally Carey	M	Vanderbilt University
33	Shelby Fredericks	A	Northwestern University
37	Halle Majorana	A	Syracuse University
46	Megan Whittle	A	University of Maryland
99	Renee Poullott	GK	Cornell University

== 2018 season ==
Date	Opponent	Home/Away	Result	Score
06/09/2018	Philadelphia Fire	Away	W	15-10
06/24/2018	New England Command	Home	L	10-11 (OT)
06/30/2018	New York Fight	Away	W	10-9
07/06/2018	Baltimore Brave	Away	L	10-18
