= Beth Glaros =

American women's lacrosse player (born 1992)

Beth Glaros (born August 20, 1992) is an American women's lacrosse player. Having played with the Maryland Terrapins at the collegiate level, she won a national championship in 2014. In 2016, she was selected by the Baltimore Ride with their ninth pick in the inaugural United Women's Lacrosse League Draft.

== Playing career ==
Glaros attended Wilde Lake High School in Maryland, where she participated in lacrosse, soccer, and track.

Glaros played college lacrosse for the Maryland Terrapins from 2011 to 2014. As a freshman, she scored four goals in the national championship game, which they lost to Northwestern. As a senior, Glaros led Maryland to the 11th national title in program history, scoring five goals in the championship game of the 2014 NCAA tournament and earning all-tournament honors.

Competing in the inaugural game in UWLX history, Glaros scored the first goal in league history, against Devon Wills of the Long Island Sound.

== Awards and honors ==
- 2014 NCAA Championship All-Tournament Team
- 2014 First Team All-ACC
- 2014 IWLCA Second Team All-American
