= 2018 WPLL season =

- League: Women's Professional Lacrosse League
- Sport: Women's lacrosse
- Teams: 5
- Finals champions: New England Command
- Runners-up: Baltimore Brave

WPLL seasons
- 2019 →

The 2018 Women's Professional Lacrosse League season was the 1st season of the Women's Professional Lacrosse League. The New England Command beat the Baltimore Brave to win the championship.

== Standings ==
Team	W	L	PCT
New England Command	4	1	
Baltimore Brave	4	1	
Upstate Pride	2	2	
New York Fight	1	3	
Philadelphia Fire	0	4	

== Schedule ==
Week	Date(s)	Winner	Score	Loser	City	Ref.
1	June 2	New England Command	13-10	New York Fight	Olney, MD	
1	June 2	Baltimore Brave	20-12	Philadelphia Fire	Annapolis, MD	
2	June 9	Upstate Pride	15-10	Philadelphia Fire	West Chester, PA	
2	June 9	Baltimore Brave	15-6	New England Command	Annville, PA	
3	June 23	Baltimore Brave	16-13	New York Fight	North East, MD	
3	June 24	New England Command	11-10 (OT)	Upstate Pride	Albany, NY	
4	June 28	New England Command	12-11	Philadelphia Fire	Boston, MA	
4	June 30	Upstate Pride	10-9	New York Fight	Hempstead, NY	
5	July 6	Baltimore Brave	18-10	Upstate Pride	Baltimore, MD	
5	July 6	New York Fight	19-10	Philadelphia Fire	Baltimore, MD	
Final	July 14	New England Command	12-11	Baltimore Brave	Sparks, MD	
