= Jeremiah Freed =

American rock band

Jeremiah Freed is a rock band from York, Maine. The band's style combines elements of the alternative and southern rock genres.

== Band ==
Jeremiah Freed is: singer Joseph Smith, drummer Kerry Ryan, guitarist Nick Goodale, guitarist Jake Roche, and bassist Matt Cosby. The band formed during their sophomore year of high school, and all graduated together in June 2000. The first song that the band learned was "Free Bird" by Lynyrd Skynyrd.

== Discography ==
Jeremiah Freed's first major record label recording was a self-titled released by the Republic/Universal label on March 26, 2002. Previously, the band had independently released a CD, which featured some of the same songs that are found on the Republic/Universal release. The next recording, a five-song EP entitled Times Don't Change, was released November 1, 2002. On August 12, 2003, Jeremiah Freed released Slowburn. Both of the final two CDs were independently released.
