= Ellie DeGarmo =

American lacrosse player

- Born: August 29, 1994 (age 31); New York, New York, U.S.
- Education: Princeton University, Princeton
- Parent(s): Lindley DeGarmo and Sarah Finlayson

Eleanor Lynn DeGarmo (born August 29, 1994) is a goalie in the Women's Professional Lacrosse League and former goalie for the Princeton University women's lacrosse team.

== Early years ==
DeGarmo grew up in Baltimore, Maryland. She was born to Sarah Finlayson and Lindley DeGarmo, who is a Presbyterian minister. DeGarmo attended Bryn Mawr High School, a private, K-12 prep school, in Baltimore, Maryland.

At Princeton University, she studies public policy at the Woodrow Wilson School of Public and International Affairs.

== College career ==
In the fall of her junior year at Bryn Mawr, DeGarmo committed to play for the Princeton University women's lacrosse team.

=== Sophomore year (2015) ===
DeGarmo made the Ivy League All-Tournament Team and was named Ivy League Defensive Player of the Week. She started all 20 games and made 134 saves (46.8% save percentage).

=== Junior year (2016) ===
DeGarmo was unanimously named Ivy League Defender of the Year, earning first-team, all-Ivy honors. A Tewaaraton Trophy top-25 finalist, she led the nation with a 55.7% regular season save percentage.

DeGarmo was named Ivy League Defensive Player of the Week three times. She received them after stopping career-highs of 13, 14, and 16 shots against UVA, Harvard, and Cornell, respectively. She started all 15 games, and has made 157 saves (55.7% save percentage).

=== Senior year (2017) ===
For the second year in a row, DeGarmo was unanimously named Ivy League Defender of the Year, earning first-team, all-Ivy honors. A Tewaaraton Trophy top-25 finalist, she led the nation with a 55.4% regular season save percentage with an average of 12.57 saves per game. With 235 saves over the season, DeGarmo set the single-season save record for Princeton.
