= Aronda Kirby =

American ice hockey manager

- Occupation: Co-founder of United Women's Sports
- Known for: Former Canadian Women's Hockey League general manager (Boston Blades)
- Awards: Clarkson Cup (2015)

Aronda Kirby was appointed as the general manager of the Boston Blades in the Canadian Women's Hockey League in May 2013. Along with former Blades head coach Digit Murphy, the two are co-founders of United Women's Sports.

== Sporting career ==
Kirby served in the capacity of director with the RI IXpress hockey program, which she also helped co-found. The program was the first girls' Tier 1 hockey program in the state of Rhode Island.

=== Boston Blades ===
Joining the Blades organization in the autumn of 2012, Kirby began in team operations. Serving as general manager of the Boston Blades during the 2014–15 CWHL season, the Blades compiled a won-loss record of 17-6-1. Of note, the Blades finished with the best regular season record in the CWHL, culminating with an overtime victory against the Montreal Stars in the 2015 Clarkson Cup finals.

=== United Women's Sports ===
The business model for UWS is based on the objective of Play It Forward Sports, which was founded in 2015, aiming to create female leaders through sport. Of note, their first venture of UWS involved lacrosse, with the launch of UWLX, its inaugural game took place on May 28, 2016.

=== Play It Forward Foundation ===
In addition to the UWLX, Murphy and Kirby are co-founders of the Play It Forward Sports Foundation, to advance gender equity in sports at all levels of play.

== Other ==
Kirby is a graduate of Rhode Island College. She was named a fellow of the Rhode Island Women's Fund Policy Institute in 2013. On April 9, 2015, Kirby was appointed by Rhode Island governor Gina Raimondo to the Rhode Island State Labor Relations Board.
