= Baltimore Brave =

Women's lacrosse team

Brave
- Founded: 2018
- First season: 2018 WPLL season
- Disbanded: 2020
- Last season: 2019 WPLL season
- League: Women's Professional Lacrosse League
- Head coach: Sonia LaMonica
- General manager: Jessy Morgan
- Website: Baltimore Brave

The Brave was a Women's Professional Lacrosse League (WPLL) professional women's field lacrosse team. They played in the WPLL beginning in the 2018 WPLL season. In the 2018 season, the five teams in the WPLL played on a barnstorming format, with all five teams playing at a single venue, and the Brave were the final champions of the league.

After cancelling the 2020 season in April due to the COVID-19 pandemic, the league announced on August 6, 2020, that it would be closing down.

== Roster ==
| NUMBER | NAME | POSITION | COLLEGE |
|---|---|---|---|
| 1 | Laura Zimmerman | M | University of North Carolina |
| 2 | Alyssa Leonard | A | Northwestern University |
| 4 | Marie McCool | M | University of North Carolina |
| 7 | Amanda Johansen | M | University of Southern California |
| 8 | Kaitlyn Montalbano | M | Towson University |
| 9 | Taylor Thornton | M/D | Northwestern University |
| 10 | Grace Nolan | A | University of Connecticut |
| 11 | Brooke Griffin | A | University of Maryland |
| 14 | Kristen Gaudian | A | James Madison University |
| 15 | Cortney Fortunato | A | University of Notre Dame |
| 24 | Kaitlyn Weeks | A | Boston College |
| 25 | Kelly McQuilkin | D | Towson University |
| 26 | Kelsea Donnelly | GK | Towson University |
| 27 | Dana Dobbie | A | University of Maryland |
| 30 | Tianna Wallpher | D | Towson University |
| 32 | Kelsey Sheridan | D | UMass Amherst |
| 33 | Kathy Rudkin | D | University of Maryland/ Syracuse University |
| 35 | Aniya Flanagan | D | University of Florida |
| 44 | Jenna Collins | M | United States Naval Academy |
| 51 | Ellie DeGarmo | GK | Princeton University |
