= New York Fight =

Women's lacrosse team

Fight
- Founded: 2018
- First season: 2018 WPLL season
- Disbanded: 2020
- Last season: 2019 WPLL season
- League: Women's Professional Lacrosse League
- Based in: Long Island, New York
- Head coach: Jill Batcheller (2020)
- General manager: Wendy Stone (2020)
- Website: New York Fight

The Fight was a Women's Professional Lacrosse League (WPLL) professional women's field lacrosse team based in Long Island, New York. They played in the WPLL beginning with the 2018 WPLL season. In the 2018 season, the five teams in the WPLL played on a barnstorming format, with all five teams playing at a single venue.

After cancelling the 2020 season in April due to the COVID-19 pandemic, the league announced on August 6, 2020, that it would be closing down.

== Roster ==
NUMBER	NAME	POSITION	COLLEGE
1	Lauren Lea	M	University of Florida
2	Sam Apuzzo	M	Boston College
4	Katrina Dowd	A	Northwestern University
5	Lindsay Scott	A	University of North Carolina/ Hofstra University
6	Kelly McPartland	M	University of Maryland
8	Alice Mercer	D	University of Maryland
10	Paige Soenksen	GK	University of Colorado Boulder
11	Caroline Fitzgerald	D	University of Florida
12	Kayla Treanor	A	Syracuse University
13	Casey Pepperman	D	University of Maryland
15	Zoe Stukenberg	M	University of Maryland
16	Nicole Graziano	M	University of Florida
17	Kylie Ohlmiller	A	Stony Brook University
18	Courtney Murphy	A	Stony Brook University
20	Marisa Romero	A	Harvard University
21	Taylor Cummings	M	University of Maryland
22	Caitlin Ingrilli	M	Northwestern University
27	Shanna Brady	D	University of Maryland
32	Daniela Eppler	D	University of Virginia
34	Kelsey Gregerson	GK	Hofstra University
48	Sarah Brown	D	University of Colorado at Boulder
