= Women's Professional Lacrosse League =

Women's lacrosse league in the United States

- Most recent season or competition: 2019 WPLL season
- Sport: Women's lacrosse
- Founded: 2018
- First season: 2018 WPLL season
- Folded: 2020
- Replaced by: Athletes Unlimited Lacrosse
- CEO: Michele DeJuliis
- No. of teams: 4
- Last champion: Brave (1) (2019 WPLL season)
- Most titles: Command; Brave (1 each)

The Women's Professional Lacrosse League (WPLL) was a women's lacrosse league in the United States. The league was formally composed of five teams: the Brave, Command, Fight, Fire, and Pride. The league announced on February 27, 2020, that it would restructure and downsize the league to four teams, which would ultimately be: the Brave, Command, Fight, and Pride. League play started on Saturday, June 2, 2018.

After cancelling the 2020 season in April due to the COVID-19 pandemic, the league announced on August 6, 2020, that it would be closing down, and that some of its athletes would be given opportunities to play with Athletes Unlimited. The new Athletes Unlimited league began play in July 2021.

== Teams ==
Team	Coach	Joined	Left
Brave	Sonia LaMonica	2018	2020
Command	Amy Patton	2018	2020
Fight	Shannon Smith	2018	2020
Fire	Ricky Fried	2018	2020 (Note: Left the league before the 2020 WPLL season was announced canceled, and the league closing down.)
Pride	Katie Rowan	2018	2020

== Media coverage ==
On April 16, 2019, ESPN and the WPLL announced that the 10-game 2019 regular season would air on ESPN3 and the ESPN App. Meanwhile, the postseason semifinals would on ESPN3, with the championship game airing on ESPNU.

== See also ==
- United Women's Lacrosse League, professional women's lacrosse league in North America
- Premier Lacrosse League, professional men's field lacrosse league in North America
- Major League Lacrosse, professional men's field lacrosse league in North America
- National Lacrosse League, professional men's box lacrosse league in North America
- List of professional sports teams in the United States and Canada
- Women's sports
