= 2011 NCAA Division I women's lacrosse tournament =

- Dates: May 14–29, 2011
- Teams: 16
- Finals site: Kenneth P. LaValle Stadium; Stony Brook, NY
- Champions: Northwestern (6th title)
- Runner-up: Maryland (16th title game)
- MOP: Shannon Smith, Northwestern
- Attendance: 19,319 finals

The 2011 NCAA Division I Women's Lacrosse Championship was the 30th annual single-elimination tournament to determine the national champion of Division I NCAA women's college lacrosse. The first two rounds of the tournament were played at the home fields of higher-seeded teams from May 14–21, and the semifinal and championship rounds were played at Kenneth P. LaValle Stadium in Stony Brook, New York from May 27–29. All NCAA Division I women's lacrosse programs were eligible for this championship, and a total of 16 teams were invited to participate.

Northwestern defeated Maryland, 8–7, to win their sixth national championship, and first since 2009. This would subsequently become the sixth of Northwestern's seven national titles in eight years (2005–2009, 2011–12) as well as the seventh of the Wildcats' eight consecutive appearances in the championship game (2005–12). This was also a rematch of the previous year's final, won by Maryland.

The leading scorer for the tournament was Shannon Smith from Northwestern (22 goals). Smith was also named the tournament's Most Outstanding Player.

== Tournament field ==
A total of 16 teams were invited to participate. 9 teams qualified automatically by winning their conference tournaments while the remaining 7 teams qualified at-large based on their regular season records.

=== Play-in games ===
May 7
Navy (Patriot, 14-5)	20
Quinnipiac (NEC, 13-4)	5

May 7
Massachusetts (A-10, 16-2)	16
Canisius (MAAC, 14-5)	8

=== Teams ===
Seed	School	Conference	Berth type	RPI	Record
1	Maryland	ACC	Automatic	2	18-1
2	Northwestern	ALC	Automatic	1	17-2
3	North Carolina	ACC	At-large	4	13-5
4	Florida	ALC	At-large	3	15-3
5	Duke	ACC	At-large	5	13-4
6	Loyola (MD)	Big East	Automatic	7	16-2
7	Albany	America East	Automatic	6	17-0
8	James Madison	CAA	Automatic	8	15-3
	Boston College	ACC	At-large	14	12-6
	Dartmouth	Ivy League	At-large	15	11-4
	Massachusetts	Atlantic 10	Automatic	9	17-2
	Navy	Patriot League	Automatic	23	15-5
	Penn	Ivy League	At-large	11	11-5
	Princeton	Ivy League	Automatic	12	11-6
	Stanford	MPSF	Automatic	10	16-2
	Virginia	ACC	At-large	13	9-8

== Tournament bracket ==
First Round; Campus sites May 14–15
1	Maryland*	19
Navy	6
8	James Madison*	10
Princeton	11
5	Duke*	12
Penn	9
4	Florida*	13
Stanford	11
3	North Carolina*	15
Virginia	7
6	Loyola (MD)*	14
Massachusetts	7
7	Albany	10
Dartmouth*	7
2	Northwestern*	11
Boston College	8

Quarterfinals; Campus sites May 21
1	Maryland*	15
Princeton	6
5	Duke	13
4	Florida*	9
3	North Carolina*	16
6	Loyola (MD)	13
7	Albany	4
2	Northwestern*	18

Semifinals; LaValle Stadium; Stony Brook, NY; May 27
1	Maryland	14
5	Duke	8
3	North Carolina	10
2	Northwestern	11

Finals; LaValle Stadium; Stony Brook, NY; May 29
1	Maryland	7
2	Northwestern	8

* Host institution

== All-tournament team ==
- Emma Hamm, Duke
- Mollie Mackler, Duke
- Brandi Jones, Maryland
- Sarah Mollison, Maryland
- Katie Schwarzmann, Maryland
- Corey Donohoe, North Carolina
- Laura Zimmerman, North Carolina
- Erin Fitzgerald, Northwestern
- Brianne LoManto, Northwestern
- Colleen Magarity, Northwestern
- Shannon Smith, Northwestern (Most outstanding player)
- Taylor Thornton, Northwestern

== See also ==
- NCAA Division II Women's Lacrosse Championship
- NCAA Division III Women's Lacrosse Championship
- 2011 NCAA Division I Men's Lacrosse Championship
