= 2010 NCAA Division I women's lacrosse tournament =

- Dates: May 15–30, 2010
- Teams: 16
- Finals site: Johnny Unitas Stadium; Towson, MD
- Champions: Maryland (10th title)
- Runner-up: Northwestern (6th title game)
- MOP: Caitlyn McFadden, Maryland
- Attendance: 26,112 finals

The 2010 NCAA Division I Women's Lacrosse Championship was the 29th annual single-elimination tournament to determine the national champion of Division I NCAA women's college lacrosse. The first two rounds of the tournament were played at the home fields of higher-seeded teams from May 15–22, and the semifinal and championship rounds were played at Johnny Unitas Stadium in Towson, Maryland from May 28–30. All NCAA Division I women's lacrosse programs were eligible for this championship, and a total of 16 teams were invited to participate.

Maryland defeated Northwestern, 13–11, to win their tenth national championship, and first since 2001. Maryland's win ended Northweastern's streak of five consecutive national titles (2005–09). Nonetheless, this would subsequently become the sixth of the Wildcats' eight consecutive appearances in the championship game (2005–12).

The leading scorer for the tournament was Shannon Smith from Northwestern (20 goals). Caitlyn McFadden from Maryland was named the tournament's Most Outstanding Player.

== Tournament field ==
A total of 16 teams were invited to participate. 9 teams qualified automatically by winning their conference tournaments while the remaining 7 teams qualified at-large based on their regular season records.

=== Play-in games ===
May 8
Navy (Patriot, 16–3)	12
Sacred Heart (NEC, 14–4)	2

May 8
Stanford (MPSF, 14–5)	15
Massachusetts (A-10, 10–9)	12

=== Teams ===
Seed	School	Conference	Berth type	RPI	Record
1	Maryland	ACC	Automatic	1	18–1
2	Northwestern	ALC	Automatic	2	17–1
3	North Carolina	ACC	At-large	3	15–2
4	Georgetown	Big East	Automatic	5	13–5
5	James Madison	CAA	Automatic	8	16–2
6	Virginia	ACC	At-large	6	13–5
7	Duke	ACC	At-large	4	13–5
8	Penn	Ivy League	Automatic	9	14–3
	Boston U.	America East	Automatic	26	11–8
	Marist	MAAC	Automatic	46	10–7
	Navy	Patriot League	Automatic	27	17–3
	Notre Dame	Big East	At-large	12	11–6
	Stanford	MPSF	Automatic	13	15–5
	Syracuse	Big East	At-large	10	13–6
	Towson	CAA	At-large	11	13–4
	Vanderbilt	ALC	At-large	7	12–5

== Tournament bracket ==
First Round; Campus sites May 15–16
1	Maryland*	20
Marist	5
8	Penn*	14
Boston U.	9
5	James Madison*	9
Stanford	8
4	Georgetown*	8
Syracuse	15
3	North Carolina*	18
Navy	5
6	Virginia*	14
Towson	12
7	Duke*	16
Vanderbilt	15
2	Northwestern*	19
Notre Dame	7

Quarterfinals; Campus sites May 22
1	Maryland*	15
8	Penn	10
5	James Madison*	3
Syracuse	7
3	North Carolina*	17
6	Virginia	7
7	Duke	8
2	Northwestern*	18

Semifinals; Johnny Unitas Stadium; Towson, MD; May 28
1	Maryland	14
Syracuse	5
3	North Carolina	10
2	Northwestern	15

Finals; Johnny Unitas Stadium; Towson, MD; May 30
1	Maryland	13
2	Northwestern	11

* Host institution

== All-tournament team ==
- Kari Ellen Johnson, Maryland
- Caitlyn McFadden, Maryland (Most outstanding player)
- Sarah Mollison, Maryland
- Katie Schwarzmann, Maryland
- Karissa Taylor, Maryland
- Corey Donohoe, North Carolina
- Laura Zimmerman, North Carolina
- Katrina Dowd, Northwestern
- Shannon Smith, Northwestern
- Danielle Spencer, Northwestern
- Liz Hogan, Syracuse
- Halley Quillinan, Syracuse

== See also ==
- NCAA Division II Women's Lacrosse Championship
- NCAA Division III Women's Lacrosse Championship
- 2010 NCAA Division I Men's Lacrosse Championship
