= 2007 NCAA Division I women's lacrosse tournament =

- Dates: May 2007
- Teams: 16
- Finals site: Franklin Field; Philadelphia, PA
- Champions: Northwestern (3rd title)
- Runner-up: Virginia (9th title game)
- MOP: Hilary Bowen, Northwestern
- Attendance: 18,369 finals

The 2007 NCAA Division I Women's Lacrosse Championship was the 26th annual single-elimination tournament to determine the national champion of Division I NCAA women's college lacrosse. The championship game was played at Franklin Field in Philadelphia, Pennsylvania during May 2007. All NCAA Division I women's lacrosse programs were eligible for this championship, and a total of 16 teams were invited to participate.

Northwestern defeated Virginia, 15–13, to win their third national championship. This would subsequently become the third of Northwestern's seven national titles in eight years (2005–2009, 2011–12).

The leading scorer for the tournament was Katie Breslin from Virginia (17 goals). Hilary Bowen, from Northwestern, was named the tournament's Most Outstanding Player.

== Tournament field ==
A total of 16 teams were invited to participate. 9 teams qualified automatically by winning their conference tournaments while the remaining 7 teams qualified at-large based on their regular season records.

=== Play-in game ===
May 5
Le Moyne (MAAC, 15-4)	19
Monmouth (NEC, 15-4)	12

=== Teams ===
Seed	School	Conference	Berth type	Record
1	Northwestern	ALC	Automatic	17-1
2	Duke	ACC	At-large	14-3
3	Virginia	ACC	Automatic	16-3
4	Penn	Ivy League	Automatic	14-1
5	Maryland	ACC	At-large	15-3
6	North Carolina	ACC	At-large	15-4
7	Johns Hopkins	ALC	At-large	11-7
8	Vanderbilt	ALC	At-large	11-5
	Boston U.	America East	Automatic	13-5
	Hofstra	CAA	Automatic	12-6
	Holy Cross	Patriot League	Automatic	13-5
	Le Moyne	MAAC	Automatic	16-4
	Princeton	Ivy League	At-large	10-6
	Richmond	Atlantic 10	Automatic	14-5
	Syracuse	Big East	Automatic	12-5
	Yale	Ivy League	At-large	13-3

== Tournament bracket ==
First Round
1	Northwestern	19
Holy Cross	7
8	Vanderbilt	10
Syracuse	16
5	Maryland	13
Yale	7
4	Penn	11
Boston U.	5
3	Virginia	19
Princeton	10
6	North Carolina	14
Richmond	7
7	Johns Hopkins	12
Hofstra	8
2	Duke	23
Le Moyne	8

Quarterfinals
1	Northwestern	14
Syracuse	9
5	Maryland	7
4	Penn	9
3	Virginia	14
6	North Carolina	8
7	Johns Hopkins	7
2	Duke	12

Semifinals
1	Northwestern	12
4	Penn	2
3	Virginia	14
2	Duke	13

Finals; Franklin Field; Philadelphia, PA
1	Northwestern	15
3	Virginia	13

== All-tournament team ==
- Caroline Cryer, Duke
- Kim Imbesi, Duke
- Hilary Bowen, Northwestern (Most outstanding player)
- Christy Finch, Northwestern
- Aly Josephs, Northwestern
- Kristen Kjellman, Northwestern
- Hannah Nielsen, Northwestern
- Karen Jann, Penn
- Hilary Renna, Penn
- Kaitlin Duff, Virginia
- Ashley McCulloch, Virginia
- Jess Wasilewski, Virginia

== See also ==
- NCAA Division II Women's Lacrosse Championship
- NCAA Division III Women's Lacrosse Championship
- 2007 NCAA Division I Men's Lacrosse Championship
