= Loyola Greyhounds women's lacrosse =

- Founded: 1973; 53 years ago
- University: Loyola University Maryland
- Head coach: Jen Adams (since 2009 season)
- Stadium: Ridley Athletic Complex (capacity: 6000)
- Location: Baltimore, Maryland
- Conference: Patriot League
- Nickname: Greyhounds
- Colors: Green and gray

NCAA Tournament Runner-Up
- 1997

NCAA Tournament Final Fours
- 1990, 1994, 1996, 1997, 2000, 2001, 2003

NCAA Tournament appearances
- 1983, 1984, 1990, 1994, 1996, 1997, 1998, 1999, 2000, 2001, 2002, 2003, 2004, 2011, 2012, 2013, 2014, 2015, 2016, 2018, 2019, 2021, 2022, 2023, 2024, 2025, 2026

Conference Tournament championships
- 1987, 1990, 1993, 1994, 1996, 1998, 2000, 2002, 2011, 2012, 2014, 2015, 2016, 2019, 2021, 2022, 2023, 2024

Conference regular season championships
- 1987, 1990, 1992, 1994, 1996, 1997, 1998, 2001, 2002, 2014, 2015, 2016, 2017, 2018, 2019, 2021, 2022, 2023, 2024, 2025

The Loyola Greyhounds women's lacrosse team is an NCAA Division I college lacrosse team representing Loyola University Maryland as part of the Patriot League. They play their home games at Ridley Athletic Complex in Baltimore, Maryland.

== Historical statistics ==
Overall
Years of Lacrosse	54
1st Season	1973
Head Coaches	7
All-Time Record	617-285-10
SALC games
SALC season W-L record (1987–91)	13-7
SALC Titles	2
SALC Tournament Titles	2
CAA games
CAA season W-L record (1992-2002)	64-5
CAA Titles	7
CAA Tournament Titles	6
Big East games
Big East season W-L record (2006–13)	31-24
Big East Titles	2
Big East Tournament Titles	0
Patriot League games
Patriot League season W-L record (Since 2014)	100-2
Patriot League Titles	12
Patriot League Tournament Titles	9
NCAA Tournament
NCAA Appearances	27
NCAA W-L record	25-27
Final Fours	7
Championship Games	1
NCAA National Championships	0

*Statistics through 2026 season

== Individual career records ==
Record	Number	Player	Years
Goals	243	Chase Boyle	2022-25
Assists	230	Livy Rosenzweig	2018-22
Points	439	Livy Rosenzweig	2018-22
Ground balls	193	Tricia Dabrowski	1999-02
Draw controls	481	Chase Boyle	2022-25
Caused turnovers	130	Jen Albright	2000-03
Saves	837	Sue Heether	1987-90
Save %	.715	Diane Geppi	1982-84
GAA	6.05	Kourtney Heavey	1995-98

== Individual single-season records ==
Record	Number	Player	Years
Goals	85	Chase Boyle	2024
Assists	71	Georgia Latch	2025
Points	127	Georgia Latch	2025
Ground balls	80	Kelly McGuigan	1992
Draw controls	238	Mae Murphy	2026
Caused turnovers	54	Kellye Gallagher	2012
Saves	312	Sue Heether	1988
Save %	.749	Diane Geppi	1983
GAA	5.37	Kim Lawton	2003

== Seasons ==
Record table
Season	Coach	Overall	Conference	Standing	Postseason
USWLA Division II (1973–1980)
1973	Raynette Fiorentino	0-8			
1974	Raynette Fiorentino	0-4			
1975	Betsy Fair	8-1-2			
1976	Betsy Fair	5-3-3			
1977	Anne McCloskey	5-4-1			
1978	Anne McCloskey	6-3			
1979	Anne McCloskey	13-4			
1980	Anne McCloskey	13-4			
AIAW Division II (1981–1982)
1981	Anne McCloskey	15-4			
1982	Anne McCloskey	13-3-1			
NCAA Division I (Independent) (1983–1986)
1983	Anne McCloskey	7-4-2			NCAA First Round
1984	Anne McCloskey	14-4			NCAA First Round
1985	Anne McCloskey	10-5			
1986	Anne McCloskey	9-6			
NCAA Division I (South Atlantic Lacrosse Conference) (1987–1991)
1987	Sandy Campanaro	8-7-1	3-1		
1988	Sandy Campanaro	8-11	1-3		
1989	Diane Aikens	9-10	2-2		
1990	Diane Aikens	14-4	4-0		NCAA Semifinal
1991	Diane Aikens	9-7	3-1		
NCAA Division I (Colonial Athletic Association) (1992–2002)
1992	Diane Aikens	11-4	5-0	1st	
1993	Diane Aikens	11-6	5-1	2nd	
1994	Diane Aikens	16-3	7-0	1st	NCAA Semifinal
1995	Diane Aikens	9-6	5-2	T-3rd	
1996	Diane Aikens	14-2	6-0	1st	NCAA Semifinal
1997	Diane Aikens	15-3	6-0	1st	NCAA Runner-up
1998	Diane Aikens	13-4	6-0	1st	NCAA Quarterfinal
1999	Diane Aikens	12-5	5-1	2nd	NCAA First Round
2000	Diane Geppi-Aikens	16-5	5-1	2nd	NCAA Semifinal
2001	Diane Geppi-Aikens	15-5	6-0	1st	NCAA Semifinal
2002	Diane Geppi-Aikens	15-4	8-0	1st	NCAA First Round
NCAA Division I (Independent) (2003–2005)
2003	Diane Geppi-Aikens	17-2			NCAA Semifinal
2004	Kerri Johnson	14-4			NCAA First Round
2005	Kerri O'Day	5-11			
NCAA Division I (Big East Conference) (2006–2013)
2006	Kerri O'Day	7-8	3-2	3rd	
2007	Kerri O'Day	2-14	0-5	6th	
2008	Kerri O'Day	6-10	1-4	5th	
2009	Jen Adams	11-6	3-4	T-4th	
2010	Jen Adams	11-7	5-3	4th	
2011	Jen Adams	17-3	6-2	T-3rd	NCAA Quarterfinal
2012	Jen Adams	14-6	7-1	2nd	NCAA Quarterfinal
2013	Jen Adams	11-9	6-3	T-2nd	NCAA Second Round
NCAA Division I (Patriot League) (2014–present)
2014	Jen Adams	15-6	8-0	1st	NCAA Second Round
2015	Jen Adams	17-5	8-0	1st	NCAA Quarterfinal
2016	Jen Adams	14-6	9-0	1st	NCAA First Round
2017	Jen Adams	11-8	9-0	1st	
2018	Jen Adams	16-5	9-0	1st	NCAA Second Round
2019	Jen Adams	16-5	9-0	1st	NCAA Second Round
2020	Jen Adams	5-0	†	†	†
2021	Jen Adams	12-3	5-0	1st (South)	NCAA Second Round
2022	Jen Adams	20-2	9-0	1st	NCAA Quarterfinals
2023	Jen Adams	19-3	9-0	1st	NCAA Quarterfinals
2024	Jen Adams	18-3	9-0	1st	NCAA Second Round
2025	Jen Adams	13-7	9-0	1st	NCAA First Round
2026	Jen Adams	12-8	7-2	3rd	NCAA First Round
Total:		617-285-10 (.684)			
National champion Postseason invitational champion Conference regular season champion Conference regular season and conference tournament champion Division regular season champion Division regular season and conference tournament champion Conference tournament champion

† NCAA canceled 2020 collegiate activities due to the COVID-19 virus.

== Postseason Results ==
The Greyhounds have appeared in 27 NCAA tournaments. Their postseason record is 25-27.

Year	Seed	Round	Opponent	Score
1983	--	First Round	Penn	L, 5-9
1984	--	First Round	Lehigh	L, 10-11 (OT)
1990	--	Quarterfinal; Semifinal	Virginia; Maryland	W, 13-7; L, 5-10
1994	--	Quarterfinal; Semifinal	Harvard; Maryland	W, 9-4; L, 4-19
1996	--	Semifinal	Virginia	L, 6-8
1997	--	Quarterfinal; Semifinal; Final	William & Mary; North Carolina; Maryland	W, 11-2; W, 10-8; L, 7-8
1998	--	First Round; Quarterfinal	West Chester #4 Dartmouth	W, 18-7; L, 8-9 (OT)
1999	--	First Round	Dartmouth	L, 7-20
2000	--	First Round; Quarterfinal; Semifinal	Delaware #4 North Carolina #1 Maryland	W, 14-4; W, 7-5; L, 7-17
2001	#7	First Round; Quarterfinal; Semifinal	#10 William & Mary #2 Duke #3 Georgetown	W, 15-7; W, 7-6; L, 9-10
2002	--	First Round	Maryland	L, 8-13
2003	#1	First Round; Quarterfinal; Semifinal	UMBC; Yale; Princeton	W, 18-3; W, 13-7; L, 3-5
2004	#4	First Round	Vanderbilt	L, 4-5
2011	#6	First Round; Quarterfinal	Massachusetts #3 North Carolina	W, 14-7; L, 13-16
2012	#6	First Round; Quarterfinal	Penn #3 Maryland	W, 10-9 (OT); L, 11-17
2013	--	First Round; Second Round	High Point #3 North Carolina	W, 18-7; L, 9-19
2014	--	First Round; Second Round	Massachusetts #7 Boston College	W, 10-4; L, 3-8
2015	--	First Round; Second Round; Quarterfinal	Bryant #5 Boston College #4 Syracuse	W, 21-3; W, 19-12; L, 7-10
2016	--	First Round	Duke	L, 8-14
2018	#8	First Round; Second Round	Fairfield; Navy	W, 18-2; L, 15-19
2019	--	First Round; Second Round	Richmond #7 Princeton	W, 19-6; L, 13-17
2021	--	First Round; Second Round	Hofstra #3 Syracuse	W, 11-9; L, 8-20
2022	#6	First Round; Second Round; Quarterfinal	Mount St. Mary's; James Madison #3 Boston College	W, 17-5; W, 18-8; L, 13-20
2023	#8	First Round; Second Round; Quarterfinal	Fairfield; Stony Brook #1 Northwestern	W, 11-6; W, 9-8; L, 6-16
2024	--	First Round; Second Round	Duke #8 Penn	W, 16-11; L, 9-12
2025	--	First Round	Stony Brook	L, 8-11
2026	--	First Round	Syracuse	L, 6-8
