= 2006 NCAA Division I women's lacrosse tournament =

- Dates: May 2006
- Teams: 16
- Finals site: Nickerson Field, Boston, MA
- Champions: Northwestern (2nd title)
- Runner-up: Dartmouth (1st title game)
- MOP: Sarah Albrecht, Northwestern
- Attendance: 14,976 finals

The 2006 NCAA Division I Women's Lacrosse Championship was the 25th annual single-elimination tournament to determine the national champion of Division I NCAA women's college lacrosse. The championship game was played at Nickerson Field in Boston, Massachusetts during May 2006. All NCAA Division I women's lacrosse programs were eligible for this championship, and a total of 16 teams were invited to participate.

Northwestern defeated Dartmouth, 7–4, to win their second national championship. This would subsequently become the second of Northwestern's seven national titles in eight years (2005–2009, 2011–12).

The leading scorer for the tournament was Crysti Foote from Notre Dame (17 goals). Sarah Albrecht, from Northwestern, was named the tournament's Most Outstanding Player.

== Qualification ==
A total of 16 teams were invited to participate. 10 teams qualified automatically by winning their conference tournaments while the remaining 6 teams qualified at-large based on their regular season records.

=== Play-in game ===
May 6
Holy Cross (Patriot, 13–6)	14
Le Moyne (MAAC, 15–3)	8

=== Teams ===
Seed	School	Conference	Berth type	Record
1	Duke	ACC	At-large	16–2
2	Virginia	ACC	Automatic	15–3
3	Georgetown	Big East	Automatic	13–3
4	Northwestern	ALC	Automatic	16–1
5	North Carolina	ACC	At-large	12–5
6	Notre Dame	Big East	At-large	13–3
7	Dartmouth	Ivy League	At-large	11–5
8	James Madison	CAA	Automatic	14–4
	Boston U.	America East	Automatic	15–4
	Cornell	Ivy League	At-large	12–3
	Holy Cross	Patriot League	Automatic	14–6
	Maryland	ACC	At-large	12–7
	Monmouth	NEC	Automatic	13–6
	Princeton	Ivy League	Automatic	11–5
	Richmond	Atlantic 10	Automatic	16–3
	Stanford	MPSF	Automatic	12–5

== Tournament bracket ==
First Round
1	Duke	18
Holy Cross	2
8	James Madison	9
Richmond	8
5	North Carolina	9
Maryland	6
4	Northwestern	17
Stanford	9
3	Georgetown	18
Monmouth	2
6	Notre Dame	16
Cornell	8
7	Dartmouth	9
Boston U.	4
2	Virginia	7
Princeton	8

Quarterfinals
1	Duke	16
8	James Madison	6
5	North Carolina	6
4	Northwestern	17
3	Georgetown	9
6	Notre Dame	12
7	Dartmouth (OT)	7
Princeton	6

Semifinals
1	Duke	10
4	Northwestern (OT)	11
6	Notre Dame	8
7	Dartmouth	14

Finals; Nickerson Field; Boston, MA
4	Northwestern	7
7	Dartmouth	4

== All-tournament team ==
- Whitney Douthett, Dartmouth
- Sarah Szefi, Dartmouth
- Devon Wills, Dartmouth
- Kristen Zimmer, Dartmouth
- Laura Anderson, Duke
- Katie Chrest, Duke
- Sarah Albrecht, Northwestern (Most outstanding player)
- Lindsay Finocchiaro, Northwestern
- Aly Josephs, Northwestern
- Kristen Kjellman, Northwestern
- Morgan Lathrop, Northwestern
- Crysti Foote, Notre Dame
- Becky Ranck, Notre Dame

== See also ==
- NCAA Division II Women's Lacrosse Championship
- NCAA Division III Women's Lacrosse Championship
- 2006 NCAA Division I Men's Lacrosse Championship
