= 2005 NCAA Division I women's lacrosse tournament =

- Dates: May 2005
- Teams: 16
- Finals site: Navy–Marine Corps Memorial Stadium; Annapolis, MD
- Champions: Northwestern (1st title)
- Runner-up: Virginia (8th title game)
- MOP: Kristen Kjellman, Northwestern
- Attendance: 10,635 finals

The 2005 NCAA Division I Women's Lacrosse Championship was the 24th annual single-elimination tournament to determine the national champion of Division I NCAA women's college lacrosse. The championship game was played at Navy–Marine Corps Memorial Stadium in Annapolis, Maryland during May 2005. All NCAA Division I women's lacrosse programs were eligible for this championship, and a total of 16 teams were invited to participate.

Northwestern defeated Virginia, 13–10, to win their first national championship. This would subsequently become the first of Northwestern's seven national titles in eight years (2005–2009, 2011–12). Furthermore, the Wildcats' championship secured an undefeated season (21–0) for the team.

The leading scorer for the tournament was Cary Chasney from Virginia (17 goals). Kristen Kjellman, from Northwestern, was named the tournament's Most Outstanding Player.

== Qualification ==
A total of 16 teams were invited to participate. 9 teams qualified automatically by winning their conference tournaments while the remaining 7 teams qualified at-large based on their regular season records.

=== Play-in game ===
May 2
Mount St. Mary's (NEC, 13-5)	18
Manhattan (MAAC, 9-7)	2

=== Teams ===
Seed	School	Conference	Berth type	Record
1	Northwestern	ALC	Automatic	17-0
2	Duke	ACC	Automatic	15-3
3	Boston U.	America East	Automatic	17-1
4	Dartmouth	Ivy League	Automatic	14-2
5	Georgetown	Big East	Automatic	12-4
6	Virginia	ACC	At-large	14-4
7	Penn State	ALC	At-large	12-4
8	Princeton	Ivy League	At-large	12-4
	Colgate	Patriot League	Automatic	13-6
	Johns Hopkins	ALC	At-large	11-5
	Maryland	ACC	At-large	12-6
	Mount St. Mary's	NEC	Automatic	14-5
	North Carolina	ACC	At-large	13-5
	Richmond	Atlantic 10	Automatic	9-7
	Syracuse	Big East	At-large	12-4
	Towson	CAA	Automatic	13-5

== Tournament bracket ==
First Round
1	Northwestern	16
Mount St. Mary's	3
8	Princeton	16
Maryland	8
5	Georgetown	15
Towson	14
4	Dartmouth	9
Syracuse	8
3	Boston U.	12
Colgate	6
6	Virginia	10
Johns Hopkins	8
7	Penn State	6
North Carolina (3OT)	7
2	Duke	16
Richmond	4

Quarterfinals
1	Northwestern	8
8	Princeton	6
5	Georgetown	3
4	Dartmouth	13
3	Boston U.	9
6	Virginia	13
North Carolina	7
2	Duke	15

Semifinals
1	Northwestern	8
4	Dartmouth	4
6	Virginia	15
2	Duke	13

Finals; Navy–Marine Corps Memorial Stadium; Annapolis, MD
1	Northwestern	13
6	Virginia	10

== All-tournament team ==
- Erin Osborn, Dartmouth
- Devon Wills, Dartmouth
- Leigh Jester, Duke
- Kristen Waagbo, Duke
- Sarah Albrecht, Northwestern
- Kristen Kjellman, Northwestern (Most outstanding player)
- Ashley Koester, Northwestern
- Courtney Koester, Northwestern
- Lindsey Munday, Northwestern
- Amy Appelt, Virginia
- Cary Chasney, Virginia
- Nikki Lieb, Virginia

== See also ==
- NCAA Division II Women's Lacrosse Championship
- NCAA Division III Women's Lacrosse Championship
- 2005 NCAA Division I Men's Lacrosse Championship
