= 2002 NCAA Division I women's lacrosse tournament =

- Dates: May 2002
- Teams: 16
- Finals site: Diane Geppi-Aikens Field; Baltimore, MD
- Champions: Princeton (2nd title)
- Runner-up: Georgetown (2nd title game)
- MOP: Lauren Simone, Princeton
- Attendance: 9,023 finals

The 2002 NCAA Division I Women's Lacrosse Championship was the 21st annual single-elimination tournament to determine the national champion of Division I NCAA women's college lacrosse. The championship game was played at Diane Geppi-Aikens Field in Baltimore, Maryland during May 2002. All NCAA Division I women's lacrosse programs were eligible for this championship. A total of 16 teams were invited to participate.

Princeton defeated Georgetown, 12–7, to win their second national championship. This was the first time since 1994 (also won by Princeton) that Maryland did not win the national title.

The leading scorer for the tournament was Lauren Simone from Princeton (23 goals). Simone was also named the tournament's Most Outstanding Player.

== Qualification ==
| Seed | School | Conference | Berth | Record |
|---|---|---|---|---|
| 1 | Georgetown | Big East | Automatic | 14–1 |
| 2 | Princeton | Ivy League | Automatic | 15–1 |
| 3 | North Carolina | ACC | Automatic | 15–2 |
| 4 | Cornell | Ivy League | At-large | 14–1 |
| | Duke | ACC | At-large | 9–7 |
| | Lafayette | Patriot | Automatic | 13–6 |
| | Le Moyne | MAAC | Automatic | 10–7 |
| | Loyola (MD) | CAA | Automatic | 15–3 |
| | Maryland | ACC | At-large | 10–9 |
| | Notre Dame | Big East | At-large | 12–4 |
| | Ohio State | ALC | At-large | 11–4 |
| | Syracuse | Big East | At-large | 10–5 |
| | Temple | Atlantic 10 | Automatic | 14–4 |
| | UMBC | NEC | Automatic | 12–4 |
| | Vanderbilt | ALC | Automatic | 10–5 |
| | Virginia | ACC | At-large | 14–3 |

== Tournament bracket ==
First Round
1 | Georgetown | 20
Lafayette | 9
Duke | 10
Vanderbilt | 5
4 | Cornell | 16
Syracuse | 8
Maryland | 13
Loyola (MD) | 8
2 | Princeton | 25
Le Moyne | 3
Notre Dame | 15
Ohio State | 7
3 | North Carolina | 22
UMBC | 6
Virginia | 20
Temple | 8

Quarterfinals
1 | Georgetown | 11
Duke | 4
4 | Cornell | 14
Maryland | 4
2 | Princeton | 11
Notre Dame | 5
3 | North Carolina (OT) | 14
Virginia | 13

Semifinals
1 | Georgetown (OT) | 12
4 | Cornell | 10
2 | Princeton | 16
3 | North Carolina | 2

Finals; Diane Geppi-Aikens Field; Baltimore, MD
1 | Georgetown | 7
2 | Princeton | 12

== All-tournament team ==
- Katie McCorry, Cornell
- Jaimee Reynolds, Cornell
- Melissa Biles, Georgetown
- Erin Elbe, Georgetown
- Chandler Vicchio, Georgetown
- Beth Ames, North Carolina
- Jazmine Norton, North Carolina
- Rachel Becker, Princeton
- Sarah Kolodner, Princeton
- Whitney Miller, Princeton
- Brooke Owens, Princeton
- Lauren Simone, Princeton (Most outstanding player)

== See also ==
- NCAA Division II Women's Lacrosse Championship
- NCAA Division III Women's Lacrosse Championship
- 2002 NCAA Division I Men's Lacrosse Championship
