= 2008 NCAA Division I women's lacrosse tournament =

Collegiate lacrosse tournament

- Dates: May 2008
- Teams: 16
- Finals site: Johnny Unitas Stadium; Towson, MD
- Champions: Northwestern (4th title)
- Runner-up: Penn (1st title game)
- MOP: Hilary Bowen, Northwestern
- Attendance: 19,093 finals

The 2008 NCAA Division I Women's Lacrosse Championship was the 27th annual single-elimination tournament to determine the national champion of Division I NCAA women's college lacrosse. The championship game was played at Johnny Unitas Stadium in Towson, Maryland during May 2008. All NCAA Division I women's lacrosse programs were eligible for this championship, and a total of 16 teams were invited to participate.

Northwestern defeated Penn 10–6 to win their fourth overall, as well as fourth straight, national championship. This would subsequently become the fourth of Northwestern's seven national titles in eight years (2005–2009, 2011–12).

The leading scorer for the tournament was Hilary Bowen from Northwestern (23 goals). Bowen was also named the tournament's Most Outstanding Player.

== Tournament field ==
A total of 16 teams were invited to participate. 8 teams qualified automatically by winning their conference tournaments while the remaining 8 teams qualified at-large based on their regular season records.

=== Play-in games ===
May 3
Colgate (Patriot, 10–9)	19
Marist (MAAC, 10–8)	18

May 3
Boston U. (A-East, 16–2)	18
Sacred Heart (NEC, 12–7)	3

=== Teams ===
Seed	School	Conference	Berth type	Record
1	Northwestern	ALC	Automatic	17–1
2	Penn	Ivy League	Automatic	14–1
3	Maryland	ACC	At-large	17–2
4	Virginia	ACC	Automatic	14–3
5	Syracuse	Big East	Automatic	16–2
6	Georgetown	Big East	At-large	12–6
7	Boston U.	America East	Automatic	17–2
8	Princeton	Ivy League	At-large	12–4
	Colgate	Patriot League	Automatic	11–9
	Duke	ACC	At-large	11–7
	New Hampshire	America East	At-large	13–5
	North Carolina	ACC	At-large	12–6
	Notre Dame	Big East	At-large	12–6
	Temple	Atlantic 10	Automatic	13–6
	Towson	CAA	Automatic	13–5
	Vanderbilt	ALC	At-large	13–5

== Tournament bracket ==
- The first two rounds were held on campus sites.

First Round; Campus sites
1	Northwestern	15
Notre Dame	7
8	Princeton	14
Vanderbilt	10
5	Syracuse	21
Towson	9
4	Virginia	7
North Carolina	11
3	Maryland	20
Temple	7
6	Georgetown	8
Duke	10
7	Boston U.	16
New Hampshire	8
2	Penn	16
Colgate	7

Quarterfinals; Campus sites
1	Northwestern	18
8	Princeton	11
5	Syracuse	13
North Carolina	11
3	Maryland	7
Duke	9
7	Boston U.	5
2	Penn	8

Semifinals; Johnny Unitas Stadium; Towson, MD
1	Northwestern	16
5	Syracuse	8
Duke	8
2	Penn (OT)	9

Finals; Johnny Unitas Stadium; Towson, MD
1	Northwestern	10
2	Penn	6

== All-tournament team ==
- Carolyn Davis, Duke
- Lindsey Gilbride, Duke
- Hilary Bowen, Northwestern (Most Outstanding Player)
- Maggie Bremer, Northwestern
- Christy Finch, Northwestern
- Meredith Frank, Northwestern
- Morgan Lathrop, Northwestern
- Hannah Nielsen, Northwestern
- Melissa Lehman, Penn
- Rachel Manson, Penn
- Hilary Renna, Penn
- Megan Mosenson, Syracuse
- Halley Quillinan, Syracuse

== See also ==
- NCAA Division II Women's Lacrosse Championship
- NCAA Division III Women's Lacrosse Championship
- 2008 NCAA Division I Men's Lacrosse Championship
