= 2000 NCAA Division I women's lacrosse tournament =

- Dates: May 2000
- Teams: 12
- Finals site: Lions Stadium, Trenton, NJ
- Champions: Maryland (8th title)
- Runner-up: Princeton (4th title game)
- MOP: Jen Adams, Maryland
- Attendance: 4,788 finals

The 2000 NCAA Division I Women's Lacrosse Championship was the 19th annual single-elimination tournament to determine the national champion of Division I NCAA women's college lacrosse. The championship game was played at Lions Stadium in Trenton, New Jersey during May 2000. All NCAA Division I women's lacrosse programs were eligible for this championship. Ultimately, 12 teams were invited to the tournament.

Maryland defeated Princeton, 16–8, to win their eighth overall and sixth consecutive, national championship. This would subsequently become the sixth of Maryland's record seven straight national titles (1995–2001).

For the second consecutive year, the leading scorer for the tournament was Jen Adams from Maryland, with 22 goals. Adams was also again named the tournament's Most Outstanding Player.

== Teams ==
Seed	School	Conference	Berth	Record
1	Maryland	ACC	Automatic	18-1
2	Princeton	Ivy League	At-large	13-3
3	James Madison	CAA	At-large	12-4
4	North Carolina	ACC	At-large	12-5
	Boston U.	America East	Automatic	15-3
	Dartmouth	Ivy League	Automatic	11-4
	Delaware	CAA	At-large	13-4
	Duke	ACC	At-large	10-5
	Georgetown	Independent	At-large	11-4
	Loyola (MD)	CAA	Automatic	14-4
	Syracuse	Independent	At-large	12-3
	Virginia	ACC	At-large	12-5

== Tournament bracket ==
First Round
Georgetown	11
Syracuse	10
Loyola (MD)	14
Delaware	4
Virginia	13
Boston U.	10
Duke	7
Dartmouth	6

Quarterfinals
1	Maryland (2OT)	7
Georgetown	6
4	North Carolina	5
Loyola (MD)	7
3	James Madison	12
Virginia	5
2	Princeton (2OT)	9
Duke	8

Semifinals
1	Maryland	17
Loyola (MD)	7
3	James Madison	9
2	Princeton	15

Finals; Lions Stadium; Trenton, NJ
1	Maryland	16
2	Princeton	8

== All-tournament team ==
- Alivian Coates, James Madison
- Kristin Hagart, Loyola (MD)
- Jess Marion, James Madison
- Stacey Moriand, Loyola (MD)
- Jen Adams, Maryland (Most outstanding player)
- Christie Jenkins, Maryland
- Alex Kahoe, Maryland
- Tonia Porras, Maryland
- Brooke Owens, Princeton
- Julie Shaner, Princeton
- Lauren Simone, Princeton

== See also ==
- 2000 NCAA Division I Men's Lacrosse Championship
- 2000 NCAA Division II Lacrosse Championship
- 2000 NCAA Division III Women's Lacrosse Championship
