= 2004 NCAA Division I women's lacrosse tournament =

- Dates: May 2004
- Teams: 16
- Finals site: Princeton Stadium; Princeton, NJ
- Champions: Virginia (3rd title)
- Runner-up: Princeton (7th title game)
- MOP: Andrea Pfeiffer, Virginia
- Attendance: 13,623 finals

The 2004 NCAA Division I Women's Lacrosse Championship was the 23rd annual single-elimination tournament to determine the national champion of Division I NCAA women's college lacrosse. The championship game was played at Princeton Stadium in Princeton, New Jersey during May 2004. All NCAA Division I women's lacrosse programs were eligible for this championship. A total of 16 teams were invited to participate. This was also the first tournament to have a total game attendance exceed 10,000 people.

In a rematch of the previous year's final, Virginia defeated Princeton, 10–4, to win their third national championship.

The leading scorer for the tournament was Amy Appelt from Virginia (15 goals). Andrea Pfeiffer, also from Virginia, was named the tournament's Most Outstanding Player.

== Qualification ==
=== Play-in game ===
May 8
Mount St. Mary's (NEC, 14–4)	12
Manhattan (MAAC, 11–7)	7

=== Teams ===
Seed	School	Conference	Berth type	Record
1	Princeton	Ivy League	Automatic	16–0
2	Virginia	ACC	Automatic	15–3
3	Maryland	ACC	At-large	14–4
4	Loyola (MD)	CAA	At-large	14–3
	Colgate	Patriot	Automatic	13–6
	Dartmouth	Ivy League	At-large	10–5
	Duke	ACC	At-large	13–5
	Georgetown	Big East	Automatic	11–4
	James Madison	CAA	Automatic	15–3
	Johns Hopkins	ALC	At-large	12–4
	Mount St. Mary's	NEC	Automatic	15–4
	New Hampshire	America East	Automatic	15–4
	Northwestern	ALC	At-large	14–2
	Notre Dame	Big East	At-large	12–4
	Temple	Atlantic 10	Automatic	11–7
	Vanderbilt	ALC	Automatic	10–5

== Tournament bracket ==
First Round
1	Princeton	18
Colgate	6
Dartmouth	14
New Hampshire	12
James Madison	14
Johns Hopkins	9
4	Loyola (MD)	4
Vanderbilt	5
3	Maryland	22
Temple	4
Georgetown (OT)	13
Duke	12
Northwestern	10
Notre Dame	8
2	Virginia	19
Mount St. Mary's	2

Quarterfinals
1	Princeton (OT)	6
Dartmouth	5
James Madison	4
Vanderbilt	10
3	Maryland	10
Georgetown	14
Northwestern	11
2	Virginia	15

Semifinals
1	Princeton	11
Vanderbilt	3
Georgetown	9
2	Virginia	12

Finals; Princeton Stadium; Princeton, NJ
1	Princeton	4
2	Virginia	10

== All-tournament team ==
- Michi Ellers, Georgetown
- Coco Stanwick, Georgetown
- Lauren Vance, Princeton
- Ashley Bastinelli, Vanderbilt
- Bridget Morris, Vanderbilt
- Katie Norbury, Princeton
- Elizabeth Pilion, Princeton
- Amy Appelt, Virginia
- Caitlin Banks, Virginia
- Nikki Lieb, Virginia
- Andrea Pfeiffer, Virginia (Most outstanding player)
- Elizabeth Pinney, Virginia

== See also ==
- NCAA Division II Women's Lacrosse Championship
- NCAA Division III Women's Lacrosse Championship
- 2004 NCAA Division I Men's Lacrosse Championship
