= 1999 NCAA Division I women's lacrosse tournament =

American women's college lacrosse championship

- Dates: May 1999
- Teams: 12
- Finals site: Homewood Field; Baltimore, MD
- Champions: Maryland (7th title)
- Runner-up: Virginia (5th title game)
- MOP: Jen Adams, Maryland
- Attendance: 7,759 finals

The 1999 NCAA Division I Women's Lacrosse Championship was the 18th annual single-elimination tournament to determine the national champion of Division I NCAA women's college lacrosse. The championship game was played at Homewood Field in Baltimore, Maryland during May 1999. All NCAA Division I women's lacrosse programs were eligible for this championship. Ultimately, 12 teams were invited to the tournament.

Maryland defeated Virginia, 16–6, to win their seventh and fifth consecutive, national championship. This was a rematch of the previous year's final, also won by the Terrapins. This would subsequently become the fifth of Maryland's record seven straight national titles (1995–2001). Furthermore, Maryland's win secured an undefeated season (21–0) for the team.

The leading scorer for the tournament, with 16 goals, was Jen Adams from Maryland. Adams was also named the tournament's Most Outstanding Player.

== Teams ==
Seed	School	Conference	Berth	Record
1	Maryland	ACC	Automatic	18-0
2	Virginia	ACC	At-large	13-5
3	Duke	ACC	At-large	12-4
4	Princeton	Ivy League	At-large	12-4
	Dartmouth	Ivy League	Automatic	10-4
	Georgetown	Independent	At-large	10-5
	James Madison	CAA	Automatic	12-4
	Loyola (MD)	CAA	At-large	12-4
	North Carolina	ACC	At-large	8-6
	Penn State	Independent	At-large	13-4
	Rutgers	Independent	At-large	14-2
	West Chester	Independent	At-large	11-3

== Tournament bracket ==
First Round
Georgetown	7
North Carolina	6
Penn State	23
West Chester	7
Dartmouth	20
Loyola (MD)	7
James Madison	11
Rutgers	6

Quarterfinals
1	Maryland	17
Georgetown	6
4	Princeton	6
Penn State (OT)	9
2	Virginia	20
Dartmouth	8
3	Duke	11
James Madison	10

Semifinals
1	Maryland	17
Penn State	13
2	Virginia	9
3	Duke	8

Finals; Homewood Field; Baltimore, MD
1	Maryland	16
2	Virginia	6

== Tournament outstanding players ==
- Sandy Johnston, Duke
- Kate Kaiser, Duke
- Jen Adams, Maryland (Most outstanding player)
- Allison Comito, Maryland
- Christie Jenkins, Maryland
- Alex Kahoe, Maryland
- Kristin Sommar, Maryland
- Colleen O'Brien, Penn State
- Jen Webb, Penn State
- Kelly Allenbach, Virginia
- Melissa Hayes, Virginia
- Gina Sambus, Virginia

== See also ==
- NCAA Division I Women's Lacrosse Championship
- NCAA Division III Women's Lacrosse Championship
- 1999 NCAA Division I Men's Lacrosse Championship
