= Duke Blue Devils women's lacrosse =

- Founded: 1996; 30 years ago
- University: Duke University
- Head coach: Kerstin Kimel (since 1996 season)
- Stadium: Koskinen Stadium (capacity: 4,500)
- Location: Durham, North Carolina
- Conference: Atlantic Coast Conference
- Nickname: Blue Devils
- Colors: Duke blue and white

NCAA Tournament Final Fours
- 1999, 2005, 2006, 2007, 2008, 2011, 2015

NCAA Tournament appearances
- 1998, 1999, 2000, 2001, 2002, 2003, 2004, 2005, 2006, 2007, 2008, 2009, 2010, 2011, 2012, 2013, 2014, 2015, 2016, 2021, 2022, 2024, 2025

Conference Tournament championships
- 2005

Conference regular season championships
- 2004, 2005, 2006, 2007

The Duke Blue Devils women's lacrosse team is an NCAA Division I college lacrosse team representing Duke University as part of the Atlantic Coast Conference. They play their home games at Koskinen Stadium in Durham, North Carolina.

== Historical statistics ==
Overall
Years of Lacrosse	29
1st Season	1996
Head Coaches	1
All-Time Record	338-182
ACC games
ACC season W-L record (Since 1997)	71-68
ACC Titles	4
ACC Tournament Titles	1
NCAA Tournament
NCAA Appearances	22
NCAA W-L record	27-22
Final Fours	7
Championship Games	0
NCAA National Championships	0

*Statistics through 2024 season

== Individual career records ==
Record	Number	Player	Years
Goals	216	Katie Chrest	2003-06
Assists	119	Kerrin Maurer	2012-15
Points	287	Katie Chrest	2003-06
Ground balls	210	Kate Kaiser	1999-03
Draw controls	791	Maddie Jenner	2019-23
Caused turnovers	142	Kate Kaiser	1999-03
Saves	646	Megan Huether	2003-06
Save %	.563	Shannon Chaney	1997-00
GAA	7.64	Kristen Foster	1999-02

== Individual single-season records ==
Record	Number	Player	Year
Goals	82	Charlotte North	2019
Assists	47	Christie Kaestner	2011
Points	105	Charlotte North	2019
Ground balls	61	Meghan Miller	2003
Draw controls	233	Maddie Jenner	2022
Caused turnovers	46	Rachel Sanford	2006
Saves	196	Megan Huether	2005
Save %	.593	Shannon Chaney	1997
GAA	6.63	Kristen Foster	2001

== Seasons ==
Statistics overview
Season	Coach	Overall	Conference	Standing	Postseason
NCAA Division I (Independent) (1996–1996)
1996	Kerstin Kimel	3-12			
NCAA Division I (Atlantic Coast Conference) (1997–present)
1997	Kerstin Kimel	8-8	0-3	4th	
1998	Kerstin Kimel	10-7	1-2	T-2nd	NCAA First Round
1999	Kerstin Kimel	13-5	1-2	T-2nd	NCAA Semifinal
2000	Kerstin Kimel	11-6	1-2	T-3rd	NCAA Quarterfinal
2001	Kerstin Kimel	15-4	2-1	2nd	NCAA Quarterfinal
2002	Kerstin Kimel	10-8	1-2	3rd	NCAA Quarterfinal
2003	Kerstin Kimel	13-5	2-1	2nd	NCAA First Round
2004	Kerstin Kimel	13-6	3-0	1st	NCAA First Round
2005	Kerstin Kimel	17-4	3-1	T-1st	NCAA Semifinal
2006	Kerstin Kimel	18-3	4-1	T-1st	NCAA Semifinal
2007	Kerstin Kimel	16-3	4-1	T-1st	NCAA Semifinal
2008	Kerstin Kimel	13-8	3-2	3rd	NCAA Semifinal
2009	Kerstin Kimel	15-6	3-2	3rd	NCAA Quarterfinal
2010	Kerstin Kimel	14-6	2-3	4th	NCAA Quarterfinal
2011	Kerstin Kimel	15-5	4-1	2nd	NCAA Semifinal
2012	Kerstin Kimel	12-7	3-2	T-2nd	NCAA Quarterfinal
2013	Kerstin Kimel	14-6	2-3	4th	NCAA Quarterfinal
2014	Kerstin Kimel	11-8	3-4	T-4th	NCAA Quarterfinal
2015	Kerstin Kimel	16-5	5-2	T-2nd	NCAA Semifinal
2016	Kerstin Kimel	11-9	4-3	T-3rd	NCAA Second Round
2017	Kerstin Kimel	8-9	1-6	8th	
2018	Kerstin Kimel	8-9	2-5	6th	
2019	Kerstin Kimel	11-8	2-5	6th	
2020 (Note: Season cancelled due to COVID-19 pandemic)	Kerstin Kimel	6-3	1-1	N/A	
2021	Kerstin Kimel	11-8	4-6	5th	NCAA Quarter Finals
2022	Kerstin Kimel	16-4	6-2	3rd	NCAA Second Round
2023	Kerstin Kimel	8-10	1-8	9th	
2024	Kerstin Kimel	10-9	4-5	6th	NCAA First Round
Total:		338-182 (.654)			
National champion Postseason invitational champion Conference regular season champion Conference regular season and conference tournament champion Division regular season champion Division regular season and conference tournament champion Conference tournament champion

== Postseason Results ==
The Blue Devils have appeared in 22 NCAA tournaments. Their postseason record is 27-22.

Year	Seed	Round	Opponent	Score
1998	--	First Round	Temple	L, 11-17
1999	#3	Quarterfinal; Semifinal	James Madison #2 Virginia	W, 11-10; L, 8-9
2000	--	First Round; Quarterfinal	Dartmouth #2 Princeton	W, 7-6; L, 8-9 (2ot)
2001	#2	First Round; Quarterfinal	#15 Temple #7 Loyola (MD)	W, 17-3; L, 6-7
2002	--	First Round; Quarterfinal	Vanderbilt #1 Georgetown	W, 10-5; L, 4-11
2003	#4	First Round	Ohio State	L, 7-10
2004	--	First Round	Georgetown	L, 12-13 (ot)
2005	#2	First Round; Quarterfinal; Semifinal	Richmond; North Carolina #6 Virginia	W, 16-4; W, 15-7; L, 13-15
2006	#1	First Round; Quarterfinal; Semifinal	Holy Cross #8 James Madison #4 Northwestern	W, 18-2; W, 16-6; L, 10-11 (ot)
2007	#2	First Round; Quarterfinal; Semifinal	Le Moyne #7 Johns Hopkins #3 Virginia	W, 23-8; W, 12-6; L, 13-14
2008	--	First Round; Quarterfinal; Semifinal	#6 Georgetown #3 Maryland #2 Penn	W, 10-8; W, 9-7; L, 8-9
2009	#5	First Round; Quarterfinal	Virginia #4 Penn	W, 15-13 (ot); L, 9-10 (2ot)
2010	#7	First Round; Quarterfinal	Vanderbilt #2 Northwestern	W, 16-15; L, 8-18
2011	#5	First Round; Quarterfinal; Semifinal	Penn #4 Florida #1 Maryland	W, 12-9; W, 13-9; L, 8-14
2012	#7	First Round; Quarterfinal	Virginia #2 Northwestern	W, 11-9; L, 7-12
2013	--	First Round; Second Round; Quarterfinal	Princeton #8 Navy #1 Maryland	W, 10-9 (2ot); W, 10-5; L, 9-14
2014	--	First Round; Second Round; Quarterfinal	Stanford #8 Notre Dame #1 Maryland	W, 13-8; W, 10-8; L, 8-15
2015	#3	Second Round; Quarterfinal; Semifinal	USC; Princeton #2 North Carolina	W, 17-9; W, 7-3; L, 7-16
2016	--	First Round; Second Round	Loyola (MD) #3 North Carolina	W, 14-8; L, 10-15
2021	#7	First Round; Second Round; Quarterfinal	Mount St. Mary's; Maryland #2 Northwestern	W, 19-13; W, 13-12; L, 10-22
2022	--	First Round; Second Round	Johns Hopkins #2 Maryland	W, 17-12; L, 6-19
2024	--	First Round	Loyola (MD)	L, 11-16
