= Virginia Cavaliers women's lacrosse =

- Founded: 1976
- University: University of Virginia
- Head coach: Sonia LaMonica (from 2023/2024 season)
- Stadium: Klöckner Stadium (capacity: 8000)
- Location: Charlottesville, Virginia
- Conference: Atlantic Coast Conference
- Nickname: Cavaliers
- Colors: Orange and blue

NCAA Tournament championships
- 1991, 1993, 2004

NCAA Tournament Runner-Up
- 1996, 1998, 1999, 2003, 2005, 2007

NCAA Tournament Final Fours
- 1986, 1987, 1991–1994, 1996, 1998, 1999, 2003–2005, 2007, 2014

NCAA Tournament appearances
- 1986, 1987, 1989, 1990–1994, 1996–2019, 2021–2025

Conference Tournament championships
- 1998, 2004, 2006–2008

Conference regular season championships
- 2002, 2005, 2006, 2008, 2010

The Virginia Cavaliers women's lacrosse team is an NCAA Division I college lacrosse team representing the University of Virginia as part of the Atlantic Coast Conference. They play their home games at Klöckner Stadium in Charlottesville, Virginia.

== History ==
In its over 40-year history, Virginia has only had four head coaches: Linda Southworth, Jane Miller, Julie Myers, and Sonia LaMonica

=== Linda Southworth era (1976–83) ===
Linda Southworth was hired as the Cavaliers' first head coach in 1975, with the first team fielded the following year. She had been a part of Longwood's first women's lacrosse team, then taught and coached at Huguenot High School, before taking the position at Virginia. In her eight-year tenure, the team went 58–37–5. She guided the program into the NCAA era, and during her time in Charlottesville, she also coached field hockey at UVa and started a local girls' middle school lacrosse league. After leaving the University of Virginia, she became the Athletics Director at St. Catherine's School in Richmond. In 2005 she was inducted into the Virginia Lacrosse Hall of Fame. As of 2012, she is still coaching girls' JV lacrosse at St. Catherine's.

=== Jane Miller era (1984–95) ===
In 1984, Jane Miller was hired as the program's second coach. Miller was a 1973 graduate of Northeastern University, where she had been a standout in basketball, field hockey, and lacrosse. In her twelve seasons, Miller compiled a record of 145–44, including six final fours and national championships in 1991 and 1993. She was awarded the IWLCA Coach of the Year in 1991 for her efforts in bringing home the program's first national title. She left after the 1995 season to accept a full-time administrative role. The next year, she was inducted into the Virginia Lacrosse Hall of Fame, and was also voted into the U.S. Lacrosse National Hall of Fame in 2003. Since 2001, she has served as the senior associate director of athletics for programs and senior woman administrator. In 2014 she was appointed to the NCAA Division I Board of Directors.

=== Julie Myers era (1996–2023) ===
Julie Myers, a 1990 graduate of Virginia, returned to her alma mater six years later to assume the head coaching position. She has led the Cavaliers to a postseason berth in all 22 of her seasons in Charlottesville, a feat unmatched by any other coach at the Division I level. Virginia's 22 straight appearances are also the second-most behind Maryland. As of the conclusion of the 2018 season, Myers has led the Cavs to a 30–22 postseason record and the 2004 national title, in addition to championship game appearances in 1996, 1998, 1999, 2003, 2005, and 2007. The Cavaliers have been ranked in the IWLCA Coaches' Poll for all but four weeks of Myers' tenure. In 2017, Myers won her 300th game, becoming just the fourth Division I coach to reach that mark.

In 2010, the women's lacrosse program garnered national attention after one of its players, Yeardley Love, was beaten to death by her ex-boyfriend, men's lacrosse player George Huguely, on May 3. Huguely was arrested later that day and charged with second-degree murder. He was sentenced to prison in 2012 and is scheduled to be released in 2029. In September 2010, Love's family created the One Love Foundation, which aims to raise awareness about relationship violence.

== Awards ==
=== NCAA awards ===
==== National Hall of Fame ====
- Julie Williams – 2002
- Heather Dow – 2002
- Jane Miller – 2003
- Cherie Greer – 2009
- Bonnie Rosen – 2010

==== NCAA Woman of the Year ====
- Peggy Boutilier – 1998

==== Honda Sports Award ====
- Amy Appelt – 2003–04

==== NCAA Top VIII ====
- Peggy Boutilier – 1999

==== Tewaaraton Trophy ====
- Amy Appelt – 2004

==== NCAA Elite 89 Award ====
- Courtney Swan – 2014

=== IWLCA awards ===
==== Coach of the Year ====
- Jane Miller – 1991
- Julie Myers – 2004

==== Assistant Coach of the Year ====
- Colleen Shearer – 2010

==== Offensive Player of the Year ====
- Jenny Slingluff – 1992
- Amy Appelt – 2004

==== Defensive Player of the Year ====
- Robyn Nye – 1991
- Cherie Greer – 1994
- Peggy Boutilier – 1997, 1998

==== Goalkeeper of the Year ====
- Michelle Cusimano – 1995, 1996

=== ACC awards ===
==== Player of the Year ====
- Peggy Boutilier – 1998
- Amy Appelt – 2004

==== Freshman of the Year ====
- Amy Fromal – 1997
- Mills Hook – 1998
- Caitlin Banks – 2001
- Amy Appelt – 2002
- Blair Weymouth – 2006
- Brittany Kalkstein – 2007
- Rachel Vander Kolk – 2015

==== Coach of the Year ====
- Julie Myers – 2002, 2008

==== Tournament MVP ====
- Kara Ariza – 1998
- Ashleigh Haas – 2004
- Tyler Leachman – 2006
- Kendall McBrearty – 2007, 2008

== Individual career records ==
Record	Number	Player	Years
Goals	258	Amy Appelt	2001–05
Assists	129	Lindsay Sheehan	1984–86
Points	373	Amy Appelt	2001–05
Ground balls	404	Elaine Maddox	1984–87
Draw controls	287	Brittany Kalkstein	2007–10
Caused turnovers	127	Tiffany Schummer; Kaitlin Duff	2000–03; 2007–10
Saves	681	Michelle Cusimano	1993–97
Save %	.659	Heather Dow	1980–82
GAA	5.12	Kim Prendergast	1990–93

== Individual single-season records ==
Record	Number	Player	Year
Goals	90	Amy Appelt	2004
Assists	66	Lindsay Sheehan	1986
Points	125	Lindsay Sheehan	1986
Ground balls	108	Elaine Maddox	1986
Draw controls	97	Brittany Kalkstein	2010
Caused turnovers	56	Samm Taylor	1998
Saves	225	Michelle Cusimano	1994
Save %	.741	Heather Dow	1981
GAA	4.97	Heather Dow	1981

== Seasons ==
Statistics overview
Season	Coach	Overall	Conference	Standing	Postseason
AIAW (1976–1982)
1976	Linda Southworth	8–4–1			
1977	Linda Southworth	8–2–1			
1978	Linda Southworth	7–4–1			
1979	Linda Southworth	5–6–1			
1980	Linda Southworth	10–6			
1981	Linda Southworth	9–3			
1982	Linda Southworth	7–5			
NCAA Division I Independent (1983–1996)
1983	Linda Southworth	4–7–1			
1984	Jane Miller	6–7			
1985	Jane Miller	11–2			
1986	Jane Miller	14–2			NCAA Semifinal
1987	Jane Miller	13–3			NCAA Semifinal
1988	Jane Miller	11–5			
1989	Jane Miller	12–5			NCAA Quarterfinal
1990	Jane Miller	12–4			NCAA Quarterfinal
1991	Jane Miller	17–1			NCAA Champions
1992	Jane Miller	14–3			NCAA Semifinal
1993	Jane Miller	15–1			NCAA Champions
1994	Jane Miller	13–4			NCAA Semifinal
1995	Jane Miller	7–7			
1996	Julie Myers	14–4			NCAA Runner-up
NCAA Division I (Atlantic Coast Conference) (1997–present)
1997	Julie Myers	14–5	1–2	3rd	NCAA Quarterfinal
1998	Julie Myers	17–3	1–2	T-2nd	NCAA Runner-up
1999	Julie Myers	15–6	1–2	T-2nd	NCAA Runner-up
2000	Julie Myers	13–6	1–2	T-3rd	NCAA Quarterfinal
2001	Julie Myers	11–7	0–3	4th	NCAA First Round
2002	Julie Myers	15–4	3–0	1st	NCAA Quarterfinal
2003	Julie Myers	17–5	1–2	3rd	NCAA Runner-up
2004	Julie Myers	19–3	2–1	2nd	NCAA Champions
2005	Julie Myers	17–5	3–1	T-1st	NCAA Runner-up
2006	Julie Myers	15–4	4–1	T-1st	NCAA First Round
2007	Julie Myers	19–4	3–2	T-3rd	NCAA Runner-up
2008	Julie Myers	14–4	4–1	T-1st	NCAA First Round
2009	Julie Myers	11–8	2–3	4th	NCAA First Round
2010	Julie Myers	14–6	4–1	T-1st	NCAA Quarterfinal
2011	Julie Myers	9–9	1–4	T-4th	NCAA First Round
2012	Julie Myers	11–8	2–3	4th	NCAA First Round
2013	Julie Myers	11–10	1–4	5th	NCAA Quarterfinal
2014	Julie Myers	12–9	3–4	T-4th	NCAA Semifinal
2015	Julie Myers	12–7	4–3	4th	NCAA Second Round
2016	Julie Myers	9–9	3–4	T-5th	NCAA First Round
2017	Julie Myers	12–9	4–3	T-3rd	NCAA Second Round
2018	Julie Myers	10–10	4–3	4th	NCAA Second Round
Total:		502–217–5 (.698)			
National champion Postseason invitational champion Conference regular season champion Conference regular season and conference tournament champion Division regular season champion Division regular season and conference tournament champion Conference tournament champion

== Postseason Results ==
The Cavaliers have appeared in 35 NCAA tournaments. Their postseason record is 39–32.

Year	Seed	Round	Opponent	Score
1986	–	Semifinal	Maryland	L, 7–12
1987	–	Quarterfinal; Semifinal	Maryland; Penn State	W, 10–5; L, 9–14
1989	–	Quarterfinal	Princeton	L, 5–6
1990	–	Quarterfinal	Loyola (MD)	L, 7–13
1991	–	Semifinal; Final	Penn State; Maryland	W, 10–5; W, 8–6
1992	–	Quarterfinal; Semifinal	Penn State; Maryland	W, 11–5; L, 7–8 (ot)
1993	–	Semifinal; Final	Harvard; Princeton	W, 11–10 (ot); W, 8–6 (ot)
1994	–	Quarterfinal; Semifinal	William & Mary; Princeton	W, 8–4; L, 13–14 (ot)
1996	–	Quarterfinal; Semifinal; Final	William & Mary; Loyola (MD); Maryland	W, 8–6; W, 8–6; L, 5–10
1997	–	Quarterfinal	North Carolina	L, 11–12 (ot)
1998	#1	Quarterfinal; Semifinal; Final	Princeton #4 Dartmouth #3 Maryland	W, 8–7; W, 10–7; L, 5–11
1999	#2	Quarterfinal; Semifinal; Final	Dartmouth #3 Duke #1 Maryland	W, 20–8; W, 9–8; L, 6–16
2000	–	First Round; Quarterfinal	Boston U. #3 James Madison	W, 13–10; L, 5–12
2001	#8	First Round	#9 James Madison	L, 8–11
2002	–	First Round; Quarterfinal	Temple #3 North Carolina	W, 20–8; L, 13–14 (2ot)
2003	#3	First Round; Quarterfinal; Semifinal; Final	American; Georgetown #2 Maryland; Princeton	W, 19–3; W, 16–9; W, 9–8; L, 7–8 (ot)
2004	#2	First Round; Quarterfinal; Semifinal; Final	Mount St. Mary's; Northwestern; Georgetown #1 Princeton	W, 19–2; W, 15–11; W, 12–9; W, 10–4
2005	#6	First Round; Quarterfinal; Semifinal; Final	Johns Hopkins #3 Boston U. #2 Duke #1 Northwestern	W, 10–8; W, 13–9; W, 15–13; L, 10–13
2006	#2	First Round	Princeton	L, 7–8
2007	#3	First Round; Quarterfinal; Semifinal; Final	Princeton #6 North Carolina #2 Duke #1 Northwestern	W, 19–10; W, 14–8; W, 14–13; L, 13–15
2008	#4	First Round	North Carolina	L, 7–11
2009	–	First Round	#5 Duke	L, 13–15 (ot)
2010	#6	First Round; Quarterfinal	Towson #3 North Carolina	W, 14–12; L, 7–17
2011	–	First Round	#3 North Carolina	L, 7–15
2012	–	First Round	#7 Duke	L, 9–11
2013	–	First Round; Second Round; Quarterfinal	Penn #6 Georgetown #3 North Carolina	W, 12–6; W, 10–8; L, 9–13
2014	#6	Second Round; Quarterfinal; Semifinal	Princeton #3 North Carolina #2 Syracuse	W, 13–11; W, 10–9; L, 8–16
2015	#7	First Round; Second Round	Winthrop; Penn State	W, 18–6; L, 11–13
2016	–	First Round	Johns Hopkins	L, 10–12
2017	–	First Round; Second Round	Elon #2 North Carolina	W, 11–9; L, 12–23
2018	–	First Round; Second Round	Stanford #3 James Madison	W, 12–3; L, 12–15
2019	#6	Second Round; Quarterfinal	Navy #3 North Carolina	W, 15–12; L, 7–14
2021	--	First Round; Second Round	UConn #5 Notre Dame	W, 19–13; L, 8–13
2022	--	First Round; Second Round	USC #1 North Carolina	W, 13–11; L, 2–24
2023	–	First Round	Albany	L, 14–16
