= Maryland Terrapins women's lacrosse =

Represents the University of Maryland in NCAA Division I women's college lacrosse

- Founded: 1974
- University: University of Maryland
- Head coach: Cathy Reese (13th season)
- Stadium: SECU Stadium (capacity: 46,185)
- Location: College Park, Maryland
- Conference: Big Ten
- Nickname: Terps
- Colors: Red, white, gold, and black

Pre-NCAA era championships
- (1) - 1981

NCAA Tournament championships
- (14) - 1986, 1992, 1995, 1996, 1997, 1998, 1999, 2000, 2001, 2010, 2014, 2015, 2017, 2019

NCAA Tournament Runner-Up
- (8) - 1984, 1985, 1990, 1991, 1994, 2011, 2013, 2016

NCAA Tournament Final Fours
- (29) - 1984, 1985, 1986, 1990, 1991, 1992, 1993, 1994, 1995, 1996, 1997, 1998, 1999, 2000, 2001, 2003, 2009, 2010, 2011, 2012, 2013, 2014, 2015, 2016, 2017, 2018, 2019, 2022, 2026

NCAA Tournament appearances
- (41) - 1983, 1984, 1985, 1986, 1987, 1990, 1991, 1992, 1993, 1994, 1995, 1996, 1997, 1998, 1999, 2000, 2001, 2002, 2003, 2004, 2005, 2006, 2007, 2008, 2009, 2010, 2011, 2012, 2013, 2014, 2015, 2016, 2017, 2018, 2019, 2021, 2022, 2023, 2024, 2025, 2026

Conference Tournament championships
- (15) - 1997, 1999, 2000, 2001, 2003, 2009, 2010, 2011, 2012, 2013, 2014, 2016, 2017, 2018, 2022

Conference regular season championships
- (17) - 1997, 1999, 2001, 2003, 2007, 2008, 2009, 2010, 2011, 2013, 2014, 2015, 2016, 2017, 2018, 2019, 2022

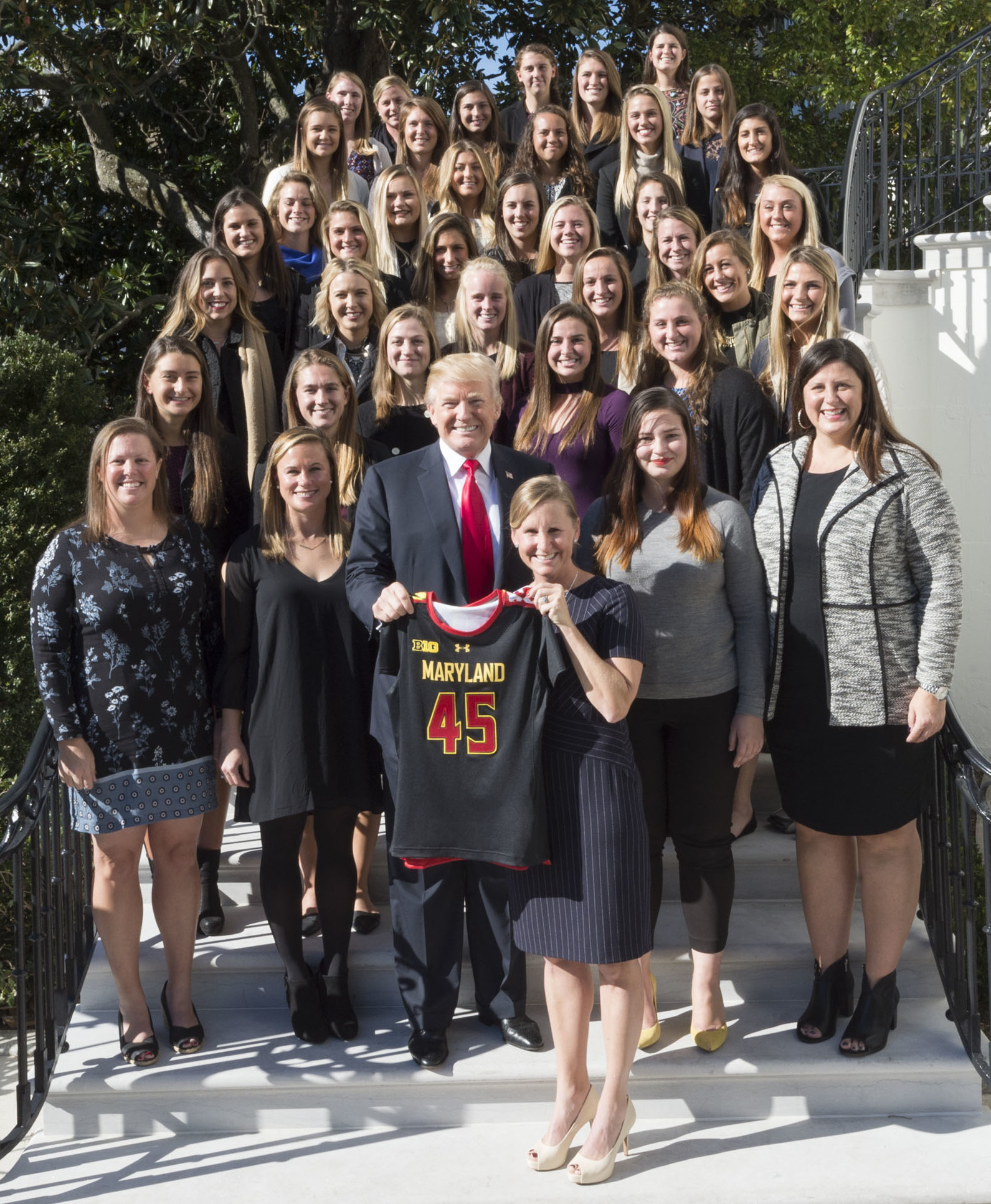
The 2017 National Championship team with President Donald Trump

The Maryland Terrapins women's lacrosse team represents the University of Maryland in National Collegiate Athletic Association (NCAA) Division I women's college lacrosse. The Maryland program has won 15 national championships, the most of any women's lacrosse program. The Terrapins have also made the most NCAA tournament appearances, won the most tournament games, and made the most NCAA championship game appearances. Before the NCAA sanctioned women's lacrosse, Maryland also won the AIAW national championship in 1981.

Starting with the 2014–15 season, the Terrapins joined the Big Ten women's lacrosse league.

== Historical statistics ==
Overall
| Years of Lacrosse | 52 |
| 1st Season | 1974 |
| Head Coaches | 4 |
| All-Time Record | 821–172–3 |
ACC games
| ACC season W–L record (Prior to 2015) | 56–19 |
| ACC Titles | 11 |
| ACC Tournament Titles | 11 |
Big Ten games
| Big Ten season W–L record (Since 2015) | 68–17 |
| Big Ten Titles | 6 |
| Big Ten Tournament Titles | 4 |
NCAA Tournament
| NCAA Appearances | 41 |
| NCAA W–L record | 81–27 |
| Final Fours | 29 |
| Championship Games | 22 |
| NCAA National Championships | 15 |

*Statistics through 2026 season

== Individual career records ==
| Record | Number | Player | Years |
|---|---|---|---|
| Goals | 298 | Megan Whittle | 2015–18 |
| Assists | 178 | Jen Adams | 1998–01 |
| Points | 445 | Jen Adams | 1998–01 |
| Ground balls | 272 | Jen Adams | 1998–01 |
| Draw controls | 509 | Taylor Cummings | 2013–16 |
| Caused turnovers | 139 | Taylor Cummings | 2013–16 |
| Saves | 968 | Alex Kahoe | 1997–00 |
| GAA | 6.74 | Alex Kahoe | 1997–00 |

== Individual single-season records ==
| Record | Number | Player | Year |
|---|---|---|---|
| Goals | 88 | Jen Adams | 2001 |
| Assists | 60 | Jen Adams | 2001 |
| Points | 148 | Jen Adams | 2001 |
| Ground balls | 77 | Jen Adams | 1999 |
| Draw controls | 144 | Taylor Cummings | 2016 |
| Caused turnovers | 52 | Taylor Cummings | 2016 |
| Saves | 269 | Alex Kahoe | 1998 |
| Save % | .673 | Jamie Brodsky | 1996 |
| GAA | 3.55 | Jamie Brodsky | 1996 |

== Seasons ==
Record table
| Season | Coach | Overall | Conference | Standing | Postseason |
|---|---|---|---|---|---|
AIAW (1974–1982)
| 1974 | Sue Tyler | 7–4 | | | |
| 1975 | Margarite Albright | 6–8 | | | |
| 1976 | Sue Tyler | 5–7 | | | |
| 1977 | Sue Tyler | 12–2 | | | |
| 1978 | Sue Tyler | 12–2–1 | | | AIAW National Runners-Up |
| 1979 | Sue Tyler | 10–6 | | | AIAW Tournament |
| 1980 | Sue Tyler | 16–1 | | | AIAW Tournament |
| 1981 | Sue Tyler | 12–3 | | | AIAW National Champions |
| 1982 | Sue Tyler | 12–6 | | | AIAW National Runners-Up |
NCAA Division I (Independent) (1983–1996)
| 1983 | Sue Tyler | 11–3–1 | | | NCAA Quarterfinals |
| 1984 | Sue Tyler | 16–1–1 | | | NCAA Runner-up |
| 1985 | Sue Tyler | 15–2 | | | NCAA Runner-up |
| 1986 | Sue Tyler | 15–4 | | | NCAA Champions |
| 1987 | Sue Tyler | 12–5 | | | NCAA Quarterfinal |
| 1988 | Sue Tyler | 11–7 | | | |
| 1989 | Sue Tyler | 9–7 | | | NCAA Quarterfinal |
| 1990 | Sue Tyler | 16–2 | | | NCAA Runner-up |
| 1991 | Cindy Timchal | 14–3 | | | NCAA Runner-up |
| 1992 | Cindy Timchal | 14–1 | | | NCAA Champions |
| 1993 | Cindy Timchal | 12–2 | | | NCAA Semifinal |
| 1994 | Cindy Timchal | 13–1 | | | NCAA Runner-up |
| 1995 | Cindy Timchal | 17–0 | | | NCAA Champions |
| 1996 | Cindy Timchal | 19–0 | | | NCAA Champions |
NCAA Division I (Atlantic Coast Conference) (1997–2014)
| 1997 | Cindy Timchal | 21–1 | 3–0 | 1st | NCAA Champions |
| 1998 | Cindy Timchal | 18–3 | 1–2 | T-2nd | NCAA Champions |
| 1999 | Cindy Timchal | 21–0 | 3–0 | 1st | NCAA Champions |
| 2000 | Cindy Timchal | 21–1 | 2–1 | T-1st | NCAA Champions |
| 2001 | Cindy Timchal | 23–0 | 3–0 | 1st | NCAA Champions |
| 2002 | Cindy Timchal | 11–10 | 0–3 | 4th | NCAA Quarterfinal |
| 2003 | Cindy Timchal | 18–4 | 3–0 | 1st | NCAA Semifinal |
| 2004 | Cindy Timchal | 15–5 | 1–2 | 3rd | NCAA Quarterfinal |
| 2005 | Cindy Timchal | 12–7 | 2–2 | T-3rd | NCAA First Round |
| 2006 | Cindy Timchal | 12–8 | 2–3 | 4th | NCAA First Round |
| 2007 | Cathy Reese | 16–4 | 4–1 | T-1st | NCAA Quarterfinal |
| 2008 | Cathy Reese | 18–3 | 4–1 | T-1st | NCAA Quarterfinal |
| 2009 | Cathy Reese | 21–1 | 5–0 | 1st | NCAA Semifinal |
| 2010 | Cathy Reese | 22–1 | 4–1 | T-1st | NCAA Champions |
| 2011 | Cathy Reese | 21–2 | 5–0 | 1st | NCAA Runner-up |
| 2012 | Cathy Reese | 19–4 | 3–2 | T-2nd | NCAA Semifinal |
| 2013 | Cathy Reese | 22–1 | 5–0 | 1st | NCAA Runner-up |
| 2014 | Cathy Reese | 23–1 | 6–1 | T-1st | NCAA Champions |
NCAA Division I (Big Ten Conference) (2015–present)
| 2015 | Cathy Reese | 21–1 | 5–0 | 1st | NCAA Champions |
| 2016 | Cathy Reese | 22–1 | 5–0 | 1st | NCAA Runner-up |
| 2017 | Cathy Reese | 23–0 | 6–0 | 1st | NCAA Champions |
| 2018 | Cathy Reese | 20–2 | 6–0 | 1st | NCAA Semifinal |
| 2019 | Cathy Reese | 22–1 | 6–0 | 1st | NCAA Champions |
| 2020 | Cathy Reese | 3–3 | 0–0 | | Cancelled due to the coronavirus pandemic |
| 2021 | Cathy Reese | 10–7 | 6–5 | T-2nd | NCAA Second Round |
| 2022 | Cathy Reese | 19–2 | 6–0 | 1st | NCAA Semifinal |
| 2023 | Cathy Reese | 15–7 | 4–2 | 2nd | NCAA Second Round |
| 2024 | Cathy Reese | 14–6 | 4–2 | 3rd | NCAA Quarterfinal |
| 2025 | Cathy Reese | 15–6 | 7–1 | 2nd | NCAA Second Round |
| 2026 | Cathy Reese | 18-4 | 6-2 | 2nd | NCAA Semifinal |
| Total: | | 821–172–3 (.826) | | | |
National champion Postseason invitational champion Conference regular season champion Conference regular season and conference tournament champion Division regular season champion Division regular season and conference tournament champion Conference tournament champion

== Postseason results ==
The Terrapins have appeared in 41 NCAA tournaments. Their combined postseason record is 81–27.

| Year | Seed | Round | Opponent | Score |
|---|---|---|---|---|
| 1983 | -- | Quarterfinal | Delaware | L, 7–11 |
| 1984 | -- | Quarterfinal; Semifinal; Final | Lehigh; Massachusetts; Temple | W, 12–6; W, 9–3; L, 4–6 |
| 1985 | -- | Semifinal; Final | Penn State; New Hampshire | W, 12–11 (3ot); L, 5–6 |
| 1986 | -- | Quarterfinal; Semifinal; Final | Northwestern; Virginia; Penn State | W, 11–7; W, 12–7; W, 11–10 |
| 1987 | -- | Quarterfinal | Virginia | L, 5–10 |
| 1990 | -- | Semifinal; Final | Loyola (MD); Harvard | W, 10–5; L, 7–8 |
| 1991 | -- | Semifinal; Final | New Hampshire; Virginia | W, 4–3; L, 6–8 |
| 1992 | -- | Semifinal; Final | Virginia; Harvard | W, 8–7 (ot); W, 11–10 (ot) |
| 1993 | -- | Semifinal | Princeton | L, 6–7 |
| 1994 | -- | Semifinal; Final | Loyola (MD); Princeton | W, 19–4; L, 7–10 |
| 1995 | -- | Semifinal; Final | Penn State; Princeton | W, 12–7; W, 13–5 |
| 1996 | -- | Semifinal; Final | Princeton; Virginia | W, 6–5; W, 10–5 |
| 1997 | -- | Quarterfinal; Semifinal; Final | Penn State; Temple; Loyola (MD) | W, 6–2; W, 9–6; W, 8–7 |
| 1998 | #3 | Quarterfinal; Semifinal; Final | James Madison #2 North Carolina #1 Virginia | W, 13–8; W, 14–9; W, 11–5 |
| 1999 | #1 | Quarterfinal; Semifinal; Final | Georgetown; Penn State #2 Virginia | W, 17–6; W, 17–13; W, 16–6 |
| 2000 | #1 | Quarterfinal; Semifinal; Final | Georgetown; Loyola (MD) #2 Princeton | W, 7–6 (ot); W, 17–7; W, 16–8 |
| 2001 | #1 | First Round; Quarterfinal; Semifinal; Final | #16 Monmouth #9 James Madison #5 Princeton #3 Georgetown | W, 23–9; W, 11–9; W, 14–7; W, 14–13 (3ot) |
| 2002 | -- | First Round; Quarterfinal | Loyola (MD) #4 Cornell | W, 13–8; L, 4–14 |
| 2003 | #2 | First Round; Quarterfinal; Semifinal | Temple; Dartmouth #3 Virginia | W, 26–6; W, 13–5; L, 8–9 |
| 2004 | #3 | First Round; Quarterfinal | Temple; Georgetown | W, 22–4; L, 10–14 |
| 2005 | -- | First Round | #8 Princeton | L, 8–16 |
| 2006 | -- | First Round | #5 North Carolina | L, 6–9 |
| 2007 | #5 | First Round; Quarterfinal | Yale #4 Penn | W, 13–7; L, 7–9 |
| 2008 | #3 | First Round; Quarterfinal | Temple; Duke | W, 20–7; L, 7–9 |
| 2009 | #2 | First Round; Quarterfinal; Semifinal | Colgate #7 Syracuse #3 North Carolina | W, 20–4; W, 12–10; L, 7–8 |
| 2010 | #1 | First Round; Quarterfinal; Semifinal; Final | Marist #8 Penn; Syracuse #2 Northwestern | W, 20–5; W, 15–10; W, 14–5; W, 13–11 |
| 2011 | #1 | First Round; Quarterfinal; Semifinal; Final | Navy; Princeton #5 Duke #2 Northwestern | W, 19–6; W, 15–6; W, 14–8; L, 7–8 |
| 2012 | #3 | First Round; Quarterfinal; Semifinal | Massachusetts #6 Loyola (MD) #2 Northwestern | W, 15–12; W, 17–11; L, 7–9 |
| 2013 | #1 | Second Round; Quarterfinal; Semifinal; Final | Stony Brook; Duke #4 Syracuse #3 North Carolina | W, 11–3; W, 14–9; W, 11–10; L, 12–13 (3ot) |
| 2014 | #1 | Second Round; Quarterfinal; Semifinal; Final | Penn; Duke #5 Northwestern #2 Syracuse | W, 13–5; W, 15–8; W, 9–6; W, 15–12 |
| 2015 | #1 | Second Round; Quarterfinal; Semifinal; Final | Massachusetts #8 Northwestern #4 Syracuse #2 North Carolina | W, 19–8; W, 17–5; W, 10–8; W, 9–8 |
| 2016 | #1 | Second Round; Quarterfinal; Semifinal; Final | Johns Hopkins; Massachusetts #4 Syracuse #3 North Carolina | W, 14–8; W, 18–3; W, 19–9; L, 7–13 |
| 2017 | #1 | Second Round; Quarterfinal; Semifinal; Final | High Point #8 Stony Brook #4 Penn State; Boston College | W, 21–6; W, 13–12; W, 20–10; W, 16–13 |
| 2018 | #1 | Second Round; Quarterfinal; Semifinal | Denver; Navy #4 Boston College | W, 15–4; W, 17–15; L, 13–15 |
| 2019 | #1 | Second Round; Quarterfinal; Semifinal; Final | Stony Brook; Denver #4 Northwestern #2 Boston College | W, 17–8; W, 17–8; W, 25–13; W, 12–10 |
| 2021 | -- | First Round; Second Round | High Point #7 Duke | W, 17–6; L, 12–13 |
| 2022 | #2 | Second Round; Quarterfinal; Semifinal | Duke #7 Florida #3 Boston College | W, 19–6; W, 18–5; L, 16–17 |
| 2023 | -- | First Round; Second Round | Drexel #7 James Madison | W, 11–6; L, 14–15 |
| 2024 | #4 | First Round; Second Round; Quarterfinal | Robert Morris; James Madison; Florida | W, 17–1; W, 17–7; L 9–15 |
| 2025 | #6 | First Round; Second Round | Fairfield; Penn | W, 16–7; L, 11–10 |
| 2026 | #3 | Second Round; Quarterfinal; Semifinal | Rutgers #6 Navy #2 North Carolina | W, 11–8; W, 14–10; L, 6–16 |

== See also ==
- Jen Adams
