= 2003 NCAA Division I women's lacrosse tournament =

Collegiate lacrosse tournament

- Dates: May 2003
- Teams: 16
- Finals site: Carrier Dome; Syracuse, NY
- Champions: Princeton (3rd title)
- Runner-up: Virginia (6th title game)
- MOP: Rachel Becker, Princeton
- Attendance: 6,614 finals

The 2003 NCAA Division I Women's Lacrosse Championship was the 22nd annual single-elimination tournament to determine the national champion of Division I NCAA women's college lacrosse. The championship game was played at the Carrier Dome in Syracuse, New York during May 2003. All NCAA Division I women's lacrosse programs were eligible for this championship. A total of 16 teams were invited to participate.

Princeton defeated Virginia, 8–7 (in overtime), to win their third overall, and second consecutive, national championship.

The leading scorer for the tournament was Lauren Aumiller from Virginia (21 goals). Rachel Becker, from Princeton, was named the tournament's Most Outstanding Player.

== Qualification ==
Seed	School	Conference	Berth type	Record
1	Loyola (MD)	CAA	At-large	15-1
2	Maryland	ACC	Automatic	16-3
3	Virginia	ACC	At-large	14-4
4	Duke	ACC	At-large	13-4
	American	Patriot	Automatic	11-7
	Boston U.	America East	Automatic	14-4
	Dartmouth	Ivy League	Auto (shared)	10-4
	Georgetown	Big East	Automatic	13-3
	James Madison	CAA	Automatic	13-5
	Le Moyne	MAAC	Automatic	12-5
	Ohio State	ALC	Automatic	13-3
	Princeton	Ivy League	Auto (shared)	12-4
	Syracuse	Big East	At-large	10-5
	Temple	A-10	Automatic	13-5
	UMBC	NEC	Automatic	10-8
	Yale	Ivy League	Auto (shared)	13-3

== Tournament bracket ==
First Round
1	Loyola (MD)	18
UMBC	3
Yale	12
Syracuse	7
4	Duke	7
Ohio State	10
Princeton	19
Le Moyne	1
2	Maryland	26
Temple	6
Dartmouth	9
Boston U.	6
3	Virginia	19
American	3
Georgetown	9
James Madison	5

Quarterfinals
1	Loyola (MD)	11
Yale	4
Ohio State	8
Princeton	17
2	Maryland	13
Dartmouth	5
3	Virginia	16
Georgetown	9

Semifinals
1	Loyola (MD)	3
Princeton	5
2	Maryland	8
3	Virginia	9

Finals; Carrier Dome; Syracuse, NY
Princeton (OT)	8
3	Virginia	7

== All-tournament team ==
- Suzanne Eyler, Loyola (MD)
- Marianne Gioffre, Loyola (MD)
- Kelly Coppedge, Maryland
- Alexis Venechanos, Maryland
- Rachel Becker, Princeton (Most outstanding player)
- Sarah Kolodner, Princeton
- Whitney Miller, Princeton
- Elizabeth Pillion, Princeton
- Theresa Sherry, Princeton
- Caitlin Banks, Virginia
- Lauri Kenis, Virginia

== See also ==
- 2003 NCAA Division I Men's Lacrosse Championship
- 2003 NCAA Division II Women's Lacrosse Championship
- 2003 NCAA Division III Women's Lacrosse Championship
