= Dartmouth Big Green women's lacrosse =

College lacrosse team

- Founded: 1973
- University: Dartmouth College
- Head coach: Alex Frank (since 2019 season)
- Stadium: Scully-Fahey Field (capacity: 1600)
- Location: Hanover, New Hampshire
- Conference: Ivy League
- Nickname: Big Green
- Colors: Dartmouth green and white

NCAA Tournament Runner-Up
- 2006

NCAA Tournament Final Fours
- 1995, 1998, 2005, 2006

NCAA Tournament appearances
- 1983, 1993, 1995, 1998, 1999, 2000, 2001, 2003, 2004, 2005, 2006, 2011, 2012, 2013, 2019

Conference Tournament championships
- 2012

Conference regular season championships
- 1986, 1987, 1995, 1997, 1998, 1999, 2000, 2001, 2003, 2005, 2011, 2019

The Dartmouth Big Green women's lacrosse team is an NCAA Division I college lacrosse team representing Dartmouth College as part of the Ivy League. They play their home games at Scully-Fahey Field in Hanover, New Hampshire.

== Historical statistics ==
Overall
Years of Lacrosse	50
1st Season	1973
Head Coaches	5
All-Time Record	399–272–4
Ivy League games
Ivy League season W-L record (since 1980)	167–87
Ivy League Titles	12
Ivy League Tournament Titles	1
NCAA Tournament
NCAA Appearances	14
NCAA W-L record	11–14
Final Fours	4
Championship Games	1
NCAA National Championships	0

*Statistics through 2018 season

== Individual career records ==
Record	Number	Player	Years
Goals	199	Jacque Weitzel	1997-00
Assists	98	Whitney Douthett	2004–07
Points	248	Jacque Weitzel	1997-00
Ground balls	236	Amy Zimmer	1998-01
Draw controls	155	Sarah Plumb	2009–12
Caused turnovers	138	Kristen Zimmer	2003–06
Saves	550	Sarah Hughes	1999-02

== Individual single-season records ==
Record	Number	Player	Years
Goals	67	Jacque Weitzel	2000
Assists	39	Jen Greene	1998
Points	79	Jacque Weitzel	2000
Ground balls	83	Amy Zimmer	2001
Draw controls	108	Kathryn Giroux	2017
Caused turnovers	62	Jacque Weitzel	2000
Saves	199	Laura Melly	1979

== Seasons ==
Statistics overview
Season	Coach	Overall	Conference	Standing	Postseason
AIAW (Independent) (1973–1979)
1973	Aggie Kurtz	2–2			
1974	Aggie Kurtz	1–7			
1975	Aggie Kurtz	7–2			
1976	Aggie Kurtz	6–4–1			
1977	Aggie Kurtz	6–6–2			
1978	Aggie Kurtz	7–9–1			
1979	Aggie Kurtz	6–9			
AIAW (Ivy League) (1980–1982)
1980	Aggie Kurtz	5–6	2–4	5th	
1981	Aggie Kurtz	5–7	2–4	5th	
1982	Josie Harper	2–9	0–6	7th	
NCAA Division I (Ivy League) (1983–present)
1983	Josie Harper	9–6	4–2	T-2nd	NCAA First Round
1984	Josie Harper	5–9	2–4	T-4th	
1985	Josie Harper	9–4	4–2	T-2nd	
1986	Josie Harper	12–3	6–0	1st	
1987	Josie Harper	10–4	5–0	T-1st	
1988	Josie Harper	10–7	4–2	T-2nd	
1989	Josie Harper	9–6	3–3	T-3rd	
1990	Josie Harper	7–9	3–3	T-3rd	
1991	Josie Harper	5–8	1–5	T-6th	
1992	Josie Harper	10–4	5–1	2nd	
1993	Amy Patton	11–4	4–2	3rd	NCAA Quarterfinal
1994	Amy Patton	11–4	4–2	3rd	
1995	Amy Patton	12–3	6–0	1st	NCAA Semifinal
1996	Amy Patton	9–6	3–3	T-3rd	
1997	Amy Patton	10–4	5–1	T-1st	
1998	Amy Patton	13–3	7–0	1st	NCAA Semifinal
1999	Amy Patton	11–5	7–0	1st	NCAA Quarterfinal
2000	Amy Patton	11–5	7–0	1st	NCAA First Round
2001	Amy Patton	13–4	6–1	T-1st	NCAA Quarterfinal
2002	Amy Patton	10–6	4–3	4th	
2003	Amy Patton	11–5	6–1	T-1st	NCAA Quarterfinal
2004	Amy Patton	11–6	6–1	2nd	NCAA Quarterfinal
2005	Amy Patton	16–3	7–0	1st	NCAA Semifinal
2006	Amy Patton	14–6	5–2	3rd	NCAA Runner-up
2007	Amy Patton	9–7	4–3	4th	
2008	Amy Patton	7–9	3–4	5th	
2009	Amy Patton	8–8	5–2	3rd	
2010	Amy Patton	11–5	5–2	2nd	
2011	Amy Patton	11–5	6–1	T-1st	NCAA First Round
2012	Amy Patton	12–5	5–2	T-2nd	NCAA First Round
2013	Amy Patton	11–8	5–2	3rd	NCAA Second Round
2014	Amy Patton	6–8	3–4	T-5th	
2015	Amy Patton	3–11	3–4	5th	
2016	Amy Patton	7–8	3–4	5th	
2017	Danielle Spencer	7–8	2–5	T-5th	
2018	Danielle Spencer	11-5	5-2	3rd	
Total:		399–272 (.595)			
National champion Postseason invitational champion Conference regular season champion Conference regular season and conference tournament champion Division regular season champion Division regular season and conference tournament champion Conference tournament champion

== Postseason Results ==
The Big Green have appeared in 15 NCAA tournaments. Their postseason record is 11–15.

Year	Seed	Round	Opponent	Score
1983	--	First Round	Princeton	L, 4–12
1993	--	Quarterfinal	Harvard	L, 8–11
1995	--	Semifinal	Princeton	L, 8–13
1998	#4	Quarterfinal; Semifinal	Loyola (MD) #1 Virginia	W, 9–8 (ot); L, 7–10
1999	--	First Round; Quarterfinal	Loyola (MD) #2 Virginia	W, 20–7; L, 8–20
2000	--	First Round	Duke	L, 6–7
2001	#4	First Round; Quarterfinal	#13 Penn State #5 Princeton	W, 9–7; L, 4–10
2003	--	First Round; Quarterfinal	Boston U. #2 Maryland	W, 9–7; L, 5–13
2004	--	First Round; Quarterfinal	New Hampshire #1 Princeton	W, 14–12; L, 5–6 (ot)
2005	#4	First Round; Quarterfinal; Semifinal	Syracuse #5 Georgetown #1 Northwestern	W, 9–8; W, 13–3; L, 4–8
2006	#7	First Round; Quarterfinal; Semifinal; Final	Boston U. Princeton #6 Notre Dame #4 Northwestern	W, 9–4; W, 7–6 (ot); W, 14–8; L, 4–7
2011	--	First Round	#7 Albany	L, 7–10
2012	--	First Round	#4 Syracuse	L, 5–15
2013	--	First Round; Second Round	Boston College #4 Syracuse	W, 11–8; L, 8–21
2019	--	First Round	Colorado	L, 13–16
