= 2001 NCAA Division I women's lacrosse tournament =

- Dates: May 2001
- Teams: 16
- Finals site: Homewood Field; Baltimore, MD
- Champions: Maryland (9th title)
- Runner-up: Georgetown (1st title game)
- MOP: Courtney Martinez, Maryland
- Attendance: 7,967 finals

The 2001 NCAA Division I Women's Lacrosse Championship was the 20th annual single-elimination tournament to determine the national champion of Division I NCAA women's college lacrosse. The championship game was played at Homewood Field in Baltimore, Maryland during May 2001. All NCAA Division I women's lacrosse programs were eligible for this championship. This year, the tournament field expanded from 12 to 16 teams, its current size.

Maryland defeated Georgetown, 14–13 after triple overtime, to win their ninth overall, and seventh consecutive, national championship. This was the last of Maryland's record seven straight national titles (1995–2001). With the win, the Terrapins also secured an undefeated season (23–0).

For the third consecutive year, the leading scorer for the tournament was Jen Adams from Maryland (26 goals). Courtney Martinez, also from Maryland, was named the tournament's Most Outstanding Player.

== Qualification ==
Seed	School	Conference	Berth	Record
1	Maryland	ACC	Automatic	19-0
2	Duke	ACC	At-large	14-3
3	Georgetown	Big East	Automatic	14-2
4	Dartmouth	Ivy League	Automatic	12-3
5	Princeton	Ivy League	At-large	12-4
6	North Carolina	ACC	At-large	10-6
7	Loyola (MD)	CAA	At-large	13-4
8	Virginia	ACC	At-large	11-6
9	James Madison	CAA	Automatic	10-8
10	William & Mary	CAA	At-large	9-6
11	Syracuse	Big East	At-large	10-4
12	Cornell	Ivy League	At-large	11-3
13	Penn State	Independent	At-large	8-9
14	Hofstra	America East	Automatic	16-2
15	Temple	Atlantic 10	Automatic	13-5
16	Monmouth	NEC	Automatic	12-7

== Tournament bracket ==
First Round
1	Maryland	23
16	Monmouth	9
8	Virginia	8
9	James Madison	11
4	Dartmouth	9
13	Penn State	7
5	Princeton	14
12	Cornell	4
2	Duke	17
15	Temple	3
7	Loyola (MD)	15
10	William & Mary	7
3	Georgetown	20
14	Hofstra	5
6	North Carolina	14
11	Syracuse	9

Quarterfinals
1	Maryland	11
9	James Madison	9
4	Dartmouth	4
5	Princeton	10
2	Duke	6
7	Loyola (MD)	7
3	Georgetown	10
6	North Carolina	4

Semifinals
1	Maryland	14
5	Princeton	7
7	Loyola (MD)	9
3	Georgetown	10

Finals; Homewood Field; Baltimore, MD
1	Maryland (3OT)	14
Georgetown	13

== All-tournament team ==
- Erin Elbe, Georgetown
- Caitlin McLean, Georgetown
- Sheehan Stanwick, Georgetown
- Suzanne Eyler, Loyola (MD)
- Stacey Moriang, Loyola (MD)
- Jen Adams, Maryland
- Quinn Carney, Maryland
- Kelly Coppedge, Maryland
- Courtney Martinez, Maryland (Most outstanding player)
- Tori Wellington, Maryland
- Rachel Becker, Princeton
- Jess Nelson, Princeton

== See also ==
- NCAA Division I Women's Lacrosse Championship
- NCAA Division II Women's Lacrosse Championship (began 2001)
- NCAA Division III Women's Lacrosse Championship
- 2001 NCAA Division I Men's Lacrosse Championship
