= 1996 NCAA Division I women's lacrosse tournament =

- Dates: May 1996
- Teams: 6
- Finals site: Goodman Stadium, Bethlehem, PA
- Champions: Maryland (4th title)
- Runner-up: Virginia (3rd title game)
- Attendance: 2,381 finals

The 1996 NCAA Division I Women's Lacrosse Championship was the 15th annual single-elimination tournament to determine the national champion of Division I NCAA women's college lacrosse. The championship game was played at Goodman Stadium in Bethlehem, Pennsylvania during May 1996. All NCAA Division I women's lacrosse programs were eligible for this championship; a total of 6 teams were invited to participate.

Maryland defeated Virginia, 10–5, to win their fourth, and second consecutive, national championship. This would subsequently become the second of Maryland's record seven straight national titles (1995–2001). Furthermore, Maryland's championship win secured its second straight undefeated season (19–0).

The leading scorer for the tournament, with 7 goals, was Kelly Amonte from Maryland. The Most Outstanding Player trophy was not awarded this year.

== Teams ==
School	Record
Loyola (MD)	14-1
Maryland	17-0
Penn State	11-4
Princeton	12-2
Virginia	12-3
William & Mary	10-6

== Tournament bracket ==
First Round
Princeton	13
Penn State	9
Virginia	8
William & Mary	6

Semifinals
Maryland	6
Princeton	5
Loyola (MD)	9
Virginia	10

Finals; Goodman Stadium; Bethlehem, PA
Maryland	10
Virginia	5

== Tournament outstanding players ==
- Kerri Johnson, Loyola (MD)
- Kelly Amonte, Maryland
- Sarah Forbes, Maryland
- Karen MacCrate, Maryland
- Sascha Newmarch, Maryland
- Tami Riley, Maryland
- Erin O'Neill, Princeton
- Lisa Rebane, Princeton
- Cristi Samaras, Princeton
- Kara Ariza, Virginia
- Peggy Boutilier, Virginia
- Michelle Cusimano, Virginia

== See also ==
- NCAA Division I Women's Lacrosse Championship
- NCAA Division III Women's Lacrosse Championship
- 1996 NCAA Division I Men's Lacrosse Championship
