= Georgetown Hoyas women's lacrosse =

- Founded: 1977; 49 years ago
- University: Georgetown University
- Head coach: Ricky Fried (since 2005 season)
- Stadium: Cooper Field (capacity: 3,750)
- Location: Washington, DC
- Conference: Big East
- Nickname: Hoyas
- Colors: Blue and gray

NCAA Tournament Runner-Up
- 2001, 2002

NCAA Tournament Final Fours
- 2001, 2002, 2004

NCAA Tournament appearances
- 1998, 1999, 2000, 2001, 2002, 2003, 2004, 2005, 2006, 2008, 2009, 2010, 2013, 2014, 2018, 2019

Conference Tournament championships
- 2010, 2019

Conference regular season championships
- 2001, 2002, 2003, 2004, 2005, 2006, 2007, 2009, 2010, 2011, 2015

The Georgetown Hoyas women's lacrosse team competes in the Big East Conference, an NCAA Division I conference. The first team was formed in 1977.

== Historical statistics ==
Overall
Years of Lacrosse	42
1st Season	1977
Head Coaches	9
All-Time Record	350-262-3
Big East games
Big East season W-L record (since 2001)	104-18
Big East Titles	11
Big East Tournament Titles	1
NCAA Tournament
NCAA Appearances	15
NCAA W-L record	14-15
Final Fours	3
Championship Games	2
NCAA National Championships	0

*Statistics through 2018 season

== Current team ==
The current head coach is Ricky Fried, who took over after Kim Simons retired following the 2004 season. Previously, Fried held the positions of assistant coach from 2002 to 2003 and associate head coach from 2003 to 2004, both under Simons.

The current assistant coaches are Erin Wellner-Hellmold and Michi Ellers. Hellmold played for Fried at Johns Hopkins University. Ellers played under Simons, with Fried as assistant coach, at Georgetown from 2002 to 2004.

== History ==
The Georgetown Women's Lacrosse team advanced to two National Championship games in 2001 and 2002. The team appeared in 9 consecutive NCAA tournaments from 1998 to 2006 and advanced to 3 NCAA Final Four games in 2001, 2002, and 2004. The team had an undefeated record in the Big East from 2001 to 2006, earning them 6 consecutive Conference Championships. In 2007, the women's lacrosse team was defeated by Syracuse University in the first ever Big East women's lacrosse tournament. However, the Hoyas had previously been crowned the Big East Regular-Season Champions.

=== 2006 season ===
In 2006, the Georgetown Women's lacrosse team continued to be a household name on the national scene. The team started the 2006 season ranked number 10/12 in National Polls and climbed all the way to earn the number 3 seed in their ninth straight NCAA Tournament appearance. Key regular season wins over Princeton, North Carolina, Maryland and Notre Dame continued to give the Hoyas a strong reputation as the women's game grows across the country. The Hoyas posted a 14-4 overall record, won its sixth straight Big East Conference Championship and made its eighth consecutive appearance in the NCAA Tournament Quarterfinals. The Hoyas defense ranked second in the nation allowing just 7.0 goals per game. During the 2006 season, the team posted a 4–1 record in a program-high five overtime games. Additionally, the squad had a 5–2 record in games decided by one goal.

New to the coaching staff in 2006, was assistant coach Michi Ellers, a former Georgetown player from 2000 to 2004. The team was led by Captains Stephanie Zodtner and Coco Stanwick.

=== 2005 season ===
After advancing to the second round of the NCAA Tournament after beating Towson University 15–14, the Hoyas fell to Dartmouth College by a score of 13–3. The game marked Georgetown's seventh consecutive appearance in the NCAA quarterfinals and the team's eighth-straight NCAA appearance. Georgetown finished the 2005 season with a 13-5 overall record and a perfect 5–0 mark in the Big East. The team earned its fifth consecutive Big East Championship, continuing its undefeated record in the conference. This was Ricky Fried's first year as head coach of the team and Bowen Holden's first year as associate head coach. This was Erin Wellner's first year as assistant coach. The team was led by Captains Lauryn Bernier, Allison Chambers and Sarah Oliphant.

=== 2004 season ===
The Hoyas continued to be undefeated Big East with a spotless 6-0 conference record in 2004. As Big East Conference Champion, the team earned an automatic bid to the NCAA tournament. The Hoyas advanced to the semifinals before losing to Virginia 12–9. The team was led by head coach, Kim Simons, associate head coach, Ricky Fried, assistant coach, Bowen Holden, and Captains Anouk Peters, Michi Ellers, and Gloria Lozano.

== Individual career records ==
Record	Number	Player	Years
Goals	232	Sheehan Stanwick	1998-01
Assists	105	Jordy Kirr	2008-11
Points	330	Sheehan Stanwick	1998-01
Ground balls	240	Erin Elbe	1999-02
Draw controls	223	Gloria Lozano	2001-04
Caused turnovers	204	Michi Ellers	2001-04
Saves	1067	Chris Lindsey	1995-98

== Individual single-season records ==
Record	Number	Player	Years
Goals	75	Sheehan Stanwick	2001
Assists	40	Sheehan Stanwick	2001
Points	115	Sheehan Stanwick	2001
Ground balls	81	Chris Lindsey	1996
Draw controls	113	Coco Stanwick	2006
Caused turnovers	66	Michi Ellers	2004
Saves	295	Chris Lindsey	1998
Save %	.720	Chris Lindsey	1996
GAA	6.38	Chris Lindsey	1996

== Seasons ==
Statistics overview
Season	Coach	Overall	Conference	Standing	Postseason
1977	Pat Becker	1-5			
1978	Pat Becker	3-6			
1979	Jill Roody	1-7			
1980	Cindy Wilhelmy	3-4-1			
1981	Cindy Wilhelmy	1-5-1			
1982	Meg Galligan	1-8			
NCAA Division I (Independent) (1983–2000)
1983	Meg Galligan	3-4			
1984	Sandie Inglis	5-4			
1985	Sandie Inglis	7-1-1			
1986	Sandie Inglis	7-3			
1987	Sandie Inglis	4-7			
1988	Sandie Inglis	6-5			
1989	Yvonne Landis	4-9			
1990	Yvonne Landis	7-6			
1991	Yvonne Landis	3-13			
1992	Yvonne Landis	3-11			
1993	Allison Williams	5-8			
1994	Allison Williams	11-3			
1995	Allison Williams	11-6			
1996	Kim Simons	12-3			
1997	Kim Simons	9-8			
1998	Kim Simons	9-7			NCAA First Round
1999	Kim Simons	11-6			NCAA Quarterfinal
2000	Kim Simons	12-5			NCAA Quarterfinal
NCAA Division I (Big East Conference) (2001–present)
2001	Kim Simons	17-3	6-0	1st	NCAA Runner-up
2002	Kim Simons	17-2	6-0	1st	NCAA Runner-up
2003	Kim Simons	13-4	6-0	1st	NCAA Quarterfinal
2004	Kim Simons	13-5	6-0	1st	NCAA Semifinal
2005	Ricky Fried	13-5	5-0	1st	NCAA Quarterfinal
2006	Ricky Fried	14-4	5-0	1st	NCAA Quarterfinal
2007	Ricky Fried	10-8	4-1	T-1st	
2008	Ricky Fried	12-7	3-2	3rd	NCAA First Round
2009	Ricky Fried	13-6	6-1	T-1st	NCAA First Round
2010	Ricky Fried	13-6	8-0	1st	NCAA First Round
2011	Ricky Fried	9-8	7-1	T-1st	
2012	Ricky Fried	9-8	5-3	4th	
2013	Ricky Fried	13-6	6-2	T-2nd	NCAA Second Round
2014	Ricky Fried	11-9	6-1	2nd	NCAA Second Round
2015	Ricky Fried	7-10	6-1	T-1st	
2016	Ricky Fried	6-11	4-3	T-3rd	
2017	Ricky Fried	9-9	7-2	T-2nd	
2018	Ricky Fried	12-7	8-1	2nd	NCAA First Round
Total:		350-262-3 (.572)			
National champion Postseason invitational champion Conference regular season champion Conference regular season and conference tournament champion Division regular season champion Division regular season and conference tournament champion Conference tournament champion

== Postseason Results ==
The Hoyas have appeared in 16 NCAA tournaments. Their postseason record is 15–16.

Year	Seed	Round	Opponent	Score
1998	--	First Round	Princeton	L, 11-12 (ot)
1999	--	First Round; Quarterfinal	North Carolina #1 Maryland	W, 7-6; L, 6-17
2000	--	First Round; Quarterfinal	Syracuse #1 Maryland	W, 11-10; L, 6-7 (ot)
2001	#3	First Round; Quarterfinal; Semifinal; Final	#14 Hofstra #6 North Carolina #7 Loyola (MD) #1 Maryland	W, 20-5; W, 10-4; W, 10-9; L, 13-14 (3ot)
2002	#1	First Round; Quarterfinal; Semifinal; Final	Lafayette; Duke #4 Cornell #2 Princeton	W, 20-9; W, 11-4; W, 12-10 (2ot); L, 7-12
2003	--	First Round; Quarterfinal	James Madison #3 Virginia	W, 9-5; L, 9-16
2004	--	First Round; Quarterfinal; Semifinal	Duke #3 Maryland #2 Virginia	W, 13-12 (ot); W, 14-10; L, 9-12
2005	#5	First Round; Quarterfinal	Towson #4 Dartmouth	W, 15-14; L, 3-13
2006	#3	First Round; Quarterfinal	Monmouth #6 Notre Dame	W, 18-2; L, 9-12
2008	#6	First Round	Duke	L, 8-10
2009	--	First Round	#8 Princeton	L, 9-15
2010	#4	First Round	Syracuse	L, 8-15
2013	#6	Second Round	Virginia	L, 8-10
2014	--	First Round; Second Round	Johns Hopkins #3 North Carolina	W, 9-8 (ot); L, 8-10
2018	--	First Round	Virginia Tech	L, 10-13
2019	--	First Round; Second Round	Penn #5 Syracuse	W, 13-12 (ot); L, 8-14

== See also ==
- Georgetown Hoyas men's lacrosse
