= 1998 NCAA Division I women's lacrosse tournament =

- Dates: May 1998
- Teams: 12
- Finals site: UMBC Stadium; Catonsville, MD
- Champions: Maryland (6th title)
- Runner-up: Virginia (4th title game)
- MOP: Cathy Nelson, Maryland
- Attendance: 6,080 finals

The 1998 NCAA Division I Women's Lacrosse Championship was the 17th annual single-elimination tournament to determine the national champion of Division I NCAA women's college lacrosse. The championship game was played at UMBC Stadium in Catonsville, Maryland during May 1998. All NCAA Division I women's lacrosse programs were eligible for this championship. This year, the tournament field expanded from 8 to 12 teams, the second consecutive expansion after increasing from 6 to 8 teams the previous year.

Maryland defeated Virginia, 11–5, to win their sixth and fourth consecutive, national championship. This would subsequently become the fourth of Maryland's record seven straight national titles (1995–2001).

The leading scorer for the tournament, with 15 goals, was Cathy Nelson from Maryland. Nelson was also the recipient of the Most Outstanding Player award, given out for the first time since 1984.

== Teams ==
Seed	School	Conference	Berth	Record
1	Virginia	ACC	Automatic	15-2
2	North Carolina	ACC	At-large	14-2
3	Maryland	ACC	At-large	15-3
4	Dartmouth	Ivy League	Automatic	12-2
	Duke	ACC	At-large	10-6
	Georgetown	Independent	At-large	9-6
	James Madison	CAA	At-large	10-7
	Loyola (MD)	CAA	Automatic	12-3
	Princeton	Ivy League	At-large	11-4
	Temple	Independent	At-large	13-4
	West Chester	Independent	At-large	13-4
	William & Mary	CAA	At-large	8-7

== Tournament bracket ==
First Round
Princeton (OT)	12
Georgetown	11
Loyola (MD)	18
West Chester	7
Temple	17
Duke	11
James Madison	15
William & Mary	9

Quarterfinals
1	Virginia	8
Princeton	7
4	Dartmouth (OT)	9
Loyola (MD)	8
3	North Carolina	11
Temple	10
2	Maryland	13
James Madison	8

Semifinals
1	Virginia	10
4	Dartmouth	7
3	North Carolina	9
2	Maryland	14

Finals; UMBC Stadium; Catonsville, MD
1	Virginia	5
2	Maryland	11

== Tournament outstanding players ==
- Kate Graw, Dartmouth
- Jacque Weitzel, Dartmouth
- Alex Kahoe, Maryland
- Kathleen Lund, Maryland
- Cathy Nelson, Maryland (Most outstanding player)
- Sascha Newmarch, Maryland
- Kristin Sommar, Maryland
- Sarah Dacey, North Carolina
- Aubrey Falk, North Carolina
- Kara Ariza, Virginia
- Peggy Boutilier, Virginia
- Melissa Hayes, Virginia

== See also ==
- 1998 NCAA Division I Men's Lacrosse Championship
- 1998 NCAA Division II Lacrosse Championship
- 1998 NCAA Division III Women's Lacrosse Championship
