= 2009 NCAA Division I women's lacrosse tournament =

- Dates: May 10–24, 2009
- Teams: 16
- Finals site: Johnny Unitas Stadium; Towson, MD
- Champions: Northwestern (5th title)
- Runner-up: North Carolina (1st title game)
- MOP: Katrina Dowd, Northwestern
- Attendance: 20,698 finals

The 2009 NCAA Division I Women's Lacrosse Championship was the 28th annual single-elimination tournament to determine the national champion of Division I NCAA women's college lacrosse. The tournament was played from May 10 to May 24, 2009, and the semifinal and championship rounds were played at Johnny Unitas Stadium in Towson, Maryland from May 22–24. All NCAA Division I women's lacrosse programs were eligible for this championship, and a total of 16 teams were invited to participate.

Northwestern defeated North Carolina, 21–7, to win their fifth overall, as well as fifth straight, national championship. This would subsequently become the fifth of Northwestern's seven national titles in eight years (2005–2009, 2011–12) as well as the fifth of the Wildcats' eight consecutive appearances in the championship game (2005–12). Furthermore, Northwestern's win secured an undefeated season (23–0) for the team.

The leading scorer for the tournament was Katrina Dowd from Northwestern (24 goals). Dowd was also named the tournament's Most Outstanding Player.

== Tournament field ==
A total of 16 teams were invited to participate. 9 teams qualified automatically by winning their conference tournaments while the remaining 7 teams qualified at-large based on their regular season records.

=== Play-in game ===
May 2
Fairfield (MAAC, 16–2)	16
Sacred Heart (NEC, 12–6)	10

=== Teams ===
Seed	School	Conference	Berth type	RPI	Record
1	Northwestern	ALC	Automatic	1	19–0
2	Maryland	ACC	Automatic	2	19–0
3	North Carolina	ACC	At-large	3	13–4
4	Penn	Ivy League	Automatic	4	13–2
5	Duke	ACC	At-large	5	14–5
6	Notre Dame	Big East	At-large	6	15–4
7	Syracuse	Big East	At-large	7	13–4
8	Princeton	Ivy League	At-large	9	13–3
	Boston U.	America East	Automatic	11	15–3
	Colgate	Patriot League	Automatic	24	14–4
	Fairfield	MAAC	Automatic	16	17–2
	Georgetown	Big East	Automatic	8	13–5
	Massachusetts	Atlantic 10	Automatic	30	11–7
	Towson	CAA	Automatic	18	13–5
	Vanderbilt	ALC	At-large	12	10–6
	Virginia	ACC	At-large	10	11–7

== Tournament bracket ==
First Round; Campus sites May 10
1	Northwestern*	23
Massachusetts	6
8	Princeton*	15
Georgetown	9
5	Duke* (2OT)	15
Virginia	13
4	Penn*	10
Fairfield	8
3	North Carolina*	15
Towson	4
6	Notre Dame*	19
Vanderbilt	13
7	Syracuse*	16
Boston U.	10
2	Maryland*	20
Colgate	4

Quarterfinals; Campus sites May 16
1	Northwestern*	16
8	Princeton	9
5	Duke	9
4	Penn* (2OT)	10
3	North Carolina*	16
6	Notre Dame	10
7	Syracuse	10
2	Maryland*	12

Semifinals; Johnny Unitas Stadium; Towson, MD; May 22
1	Northwestern (2OT)	13
4	Penn	12
3	North Carolina	8
2	Maryland	7

Finals; Johnny Unitas Stadium; Towson, MD; May 24
1	Northwestern	21
3	North Carolina	7

* Host institution

== All-tournament team ==
- Kari Ellen Johnson, Maryland
- Brittany Poist, Maryland
- Amber Falcone, North Carolina
- Jenn Russell, North Carolina
- Laura Zimmerman, North Carolina
- Hilary Bowen, Northwestern
- Katrina Dowd, Northwestern (Most outstanding player)
- Meredith Frank, Northwestern
- Hannah Nielsen, Northwestern
- Danielle Spencer, Northwestern
- Ali DeLuca, Penn
- Katie Mazer, Penn

== See also ==
- NCAA Division II Women's Lacrosse Championship
- NCAA Division III Women's Lacrosse Championship
- 2009 NCAA Division I Men's Lacrosse Championship
