= 1993 NCAA Division I women's lacrosse tournament =

- Dates: May 1993
- Teams: 6
- Finals site: Byrd Stadium; College Park, MD
- Champions: Virginia (2nd title)
- Runner-up: Princeton (1st title game)
- Attendance: 2,730 finals

The 1993 NCAA Division I Women's Lacrosse Championship was the 12th annual single-elimination tournament to determine the national championship of Division I NCAA women's college lacrosse. The championship game was played at Byrd Stadium in College Park, Maryland during May 1993. All NCAA Division I women's lacrosse programs were eligible for this championship; a total of 6 teams were invited to participate.

Virginia defeated Princeton, 8–6 (in overtime), to win their second national championship.

The leading scorer for the tournament, with 9 goals, was Jenny Bristow, from Princeton. The Most Outstanding Player trophy was not awarded this year.

== Teams ==
School	Record
Dartmouth	11-3
Harvard	12-2
Maryland	12-1
Penn State	11-4
Princeton	13-2
Virginia	13-1

== Tournament bracket ==
First Round
Harvard	11
Dartmouth	8
Princeton	11
Penn State	7

Semifinals
Virginia (OT)	11
Harvard	10
Maryland	6
Princeton	7

Finals; Byrd Stadium; College Park, MD
Virginia (OT)	8
Princeton	6

== Tournament outstanding players ==
- Liz Berkery, Harvard
- Betsy Elder, Maryland
- Jenny Bristow, Princeton
- Erin O'Neill, Princeton
- Amory Rowe, Princeton
- Cherie Greer, Virginia
- Crista Mathes, Virginia
- Kim Prendergast, Virginia
- Anna Yates, Virginia

== See also ==
- NCAA Division I Women's Lacrosse Championship
- NCAA Division III Women's Lacrosse Championship
- 1993 NCAA Division I Men's Lacrosse Championship
