= Princeton Tigers women's lacrosse =

Lacrosse team

- Founded: 1973; 53 years ago
- University: Princeton University
- Head coach: Jenn Cook (since 2023 season)
- Stadium: Sherrerd Field at Class of 1952 Stadium (capacity: 4000)
- Location: Princeton, New Jersey
- Conference: Ivy League
- Nickname: Tigers
- Colors: Black and orange

NCAA Tournament championships
- 1994, 2002, 2003

NCAA Tournament Runner-Up
- 1993, 1995, 2000, 2004

NCAA Tournament Final Fours
- 1989, 1992, 1993, 1994, 1995, 1996, 1998, 2000, 2001, 2002, 2003, 2004

NCAA Tournament appearances
- 1983, 1989, 1992, 1993, 1994, 1995, 1996, 1998, 1999, 2000, 2001, 2002, 2003, 2004, 2005, 2006, 2007, 2008, 2009, 2011, 2013, 2014, 2015, 2016, 2017, 2018, 2019, 2022, 2024, 2025, 2026

Conference Tournament championships
- 2011, 2015, 2017, 2018, 2019, 2022, 2026

Conference regular season championships
- 1993, 1994, 1996, 1997, 2001, 2002, 2003, 2004, 2006, 2014, 2015, 2016, 2017, 2018, 2019, 2022, 2025

The Princeton Tigers women's lacrosse team is an NCAA Division I college lacrosse team representing Princeton University as part of the Ivy League. They play their home games at Sherrerd Field at Class of 1952 Stadium in Princeton, New Jersey.

== Historical statistics ==
Overall
Years of Lacrosse	54
1st Season	1973
Head coaches	4
All-Time Record	540–274–7
Ivy League games
Ivy League season W-L record (Since 1980)	216–74–1
Ivy League Titles	17
Ivy League Tournament Titles	7
NCAA Tournament
NCAA Appearances	31
NCAA W-L record	42–28
Final Fours	12
Championship Games	7
NCAA National Championships	3

*Statistics through 2026 season

== Individual career records ==
Record	Number	Player	Years
Goals	231	McKenzie Blake	2022–25
Assists	166	Haven Dora	2023–26
Points	307	Kyla Sears	2018–22
Ground balls	289	Julie Shaner	1998–01
Draw controls	249	Sophie Whiteway	2022–25
Caused turnovers	171	Rachael Becker	2000–03
Saves	731	Erin O'Neill	1993–96
Save %	.667	Catherine Wolf	1975–77
GAA	6.16	Leila Saddic	1990–92

== Individual single-season records ==
Record	Number	Player	Year
Goals	89	McKenzie Blake	2025
Assists	60	Haven Dora	2025
Points	110	Olivia Hompe	2017
Ground balls	118	Barbara Russell	1981
Draw controls	112	Marge Donovan	2022
Caused turnovers	58	Cristi Samaras	1998
Saves	235	Ellie DeGarmo	2017
Save %	.667	Catherine Wolf	1977
GAA	3.20	Abby Westervelt	1978

== Seasons ==
Record table
Season	Coach	Overall	Conference	Standing	Postseason
AIAW (Independent) (1973–1979)
1973	Penny Hinckley	0–2			
1974	Penny Hinckley	3–3			
1975	Penny Hinckley	2–5–1			
1976	Penny Hinckley	2–5–1			
1977	Penny Hinckley	3–4			
1978	Betty Logan	6–1–3			
1979	Betty Logan	9–3–1			AIAW Quarterfinal
AIAW (Ivy League) (1980–1981)
1980	Betty Logan	10–5–1	3–2–1	4th	AIAW Consolation Winner
1981	Betty Logan	7–5	3–3	4th	
NCAA Division I (Ivy League) (1982–present)
1982	Betty Logan	6–6	4–2	T-3rd	
1983	Betty Logan	8–7	4–2	T-2nd	NCAA Quarterfinal
1984	Betty Logan	2–12	2–4	T-4th	
1985	Betty Logan	1–11	1–5	T-5th	
1986	Betty Logan	3–10	2–4	T-5th	
1987	Chris Sailer	3–9	1–5	T-6th	
1988	Chris Sailer	7–7	2–4	T-4th	
1989	Chris Sailer	14–3	5–1	2nd	NCAA Semifinal
1990	Chris Sailer	14–2	5–1	2nd	
1991	Chris Sailer	11–6	3–3	T-3rd	
1992	Chris Sailer	13–4	4–2	3rd	NCAA Semifinal
1993	Chris Sailer	15–3	5–1	T-1st	NCAA Runner-up
1994	Chris Sailer	16–1	6–0	1st	NCAA Champions
1995	Chris Sailer	14–3	5–1	2nd	NCAA Runner-up
1996	Chris Sailer	13–3	6–0	1st	NCAA Semifinal
1997	Chris Sailer	7–7	5–1	T-1st	
1998	Chris Sailer	12–5	6–1	2nd	NCAA Semifinal
1999	Chris Sailer	12–5	6–1	2nd	NCAA Quarterfinal
2000	Chris Sailer	15–4	6–1	2nd	NCAA Runner-up
2001	Chris Sailer	14–5	6–1	T-1st	NCAA Semifinal
2002	Chris Sailer	19–1	7–0	1st	NCAA Champions
2003	Chris Sailer	16–4	6–1	T-1st	NCAA Champions
2004	Chris Sailer	19–1	7–0	1st	NCAA Runner-up
2005	Chris Sailer	13–5	6–1	2nd	NCAA Quarterfinal
2006	Chris Sailer	12–6	6–1	T-1st	NCAA Quarterfinal
2007	Chris Sailer	10–7	5–2	3rd	NCAA First Round
2008	Chris Sailer	13–5	5–2	T-2nd	NCAA Quarterfinal
2009	Chris Sailer	14–4	6–1	2nd	NCAA Quarterfinal
2010	Chris Sailer	6–10	4–3	T-3rd	
2011	Chris Sailer	12–7	5–2	T-3rd	NCAA Quarterfinal
2012	Chris Sailer	8–7	4–3	5th	
2013	Chris Sailer	10–7	6–1	2nd	NCAA First Round
2014	Chris Sailer	12–7	6–1	T-1st	NCAA Second Round
2015	Chris Sailer	16–4	7–0	1st	NCAA Quarterfinal
2016	Chris Sailer	11–6	6–1	T-1st	NCAA First Round
2017	Chris Sailer	15–4	6–1	T-1st	NCAA Quarterfinal
2018	Chris Sailer	13–6	6–1	T-1st	NCAA Second Round
2019	Chris Sailer	16–4	6–1	T-1st	NCAA Quarterfinal
2020	Chris Sailer	3–2	0–0		
2022	Chris Sailer	15–4	7–0	1st	NCAA Second Round
2023	Jenn Cook	7–9	4–3	T–3rd	
2024	Jenn Cook	11–7	6–1	2nd	NCAA Second Round
2025	Jenn Cook	16–4	6–1	1st	NCAA Quarterfinal
2026	Jenn Cook	11–7	5–2	T-2nd	NCAA First Round
Total:		540–274–7 (.662)			
National champion Postseason invitational champion Conference regular season champion Conference regular season and conference tournament champion Division regular season champion Division regular season and conference tournament champion Conference tournament champion

== Postseason results ==
The Tigers have appeared in 31 NCAA tournaments. Their postseason record is 42–28.

Year	Seed	Round	Opponent	Score
1983	–	First Round; Quarterfinal	Dartmouth; Temple	W, 12–10; L, 6–16
1989	–	Quarterfinal; Semifinal	Virginia; Harvard	W, 6–5; L, 5–7
1992	–	Quarterfinal; Semifinal	Temple; Harvard	W, 11–6; L, 5–10
1993	–	Quarterfinal; Semifinal; Final	Penn State; Maryland; Virginia	W, 11–7; W, 7–6; L, 6–8 (ot)
1994	–	Semifinal; Final	Virginia; Maryland	W, 14–13 (ot); W, 10–7
1995	–	Quarterfinal; Semifinal; Final	Temple; Dartmouth; Maryland	W, 14–8; W, 13–8; L, 5–13
1996	–	Quarterfinal; Semifinal	Penn State; Maryland	W, 13–9; L, 5–6
1998	–	Quarterfinal; Semifinal	Georgetown #1 Virginia	W, 12–11; L, 7–8
1999	#4	Quarterfinal	Penn State	L, 7–8
2000	#2	Quarterfinal; Semifinal; Final	Duke #3 James Madison #1 Maryland	W, 9–8 (3ot); W, 15–9; L, 8–16
2001	#5	First Round; Quarterfinal; Semifinal	#12 Cornell #4 Dartmouth #1 Maryland	W, 14–4; W, 10–4; L, 7–14
2002	#2	First Round; Quarterfinal; Semifinal; Final	Le Moyne; Notre Dame #3 North Carolina #1 Georgetown	W, 25–3; W, 11–5; W, 16–2; W, 12–7
2003	–	First Round; Quarterfinal; Semifinal; Final	Le Moyne; Ohio State #1 Loyola (MD) #3 Virginia	W, 19–1; W, 17–8; W, 5–3; W, 8–7 (ot)
2004	#1	First Round; Quarterfinal; Semifinal; Final	Colgate; Dartmouth; Vanderbilt #2 Virginia	W, 18–6; W, 6–5 (ot); W, 11–3; L, 4–10
2005	#8	First Round; Quarterfinal	Maryland #1 Northwestern	W, 16–8; L, 6–8
2006	–	First Round; Quarterfinal	#2 Virginia #7 Dartmouth	W, 8–7; L, 6–7 (2ot)
2007	–	First Round	#3 Virginia	L, 10–19
2008	#8	First Round; Quarterfinal	Vanderbilt #1 Northwestern	W, 14–10; L, 11–18
2009	#8	First Round; Quarterfinal	Georgetown #1 Northwestern	W, 15–9; L, 9–16
2011	–	First Round; Quarterfinal	#8 James Madison #1 Maryland	W, 11–10; L, 6–15
2013	–	First Round	Duke	L, 9–10 (2ot)
2014	–	First Round; Second Round	Penn State #6 Virginia	W, 16–13; L, 11–13
2015	–	First Round; Second Round; Quarterfinal	Fairfield #6 Stony Brook #3 Duke	W, 18–8; W, 8–4; L, 3–7
2016	–	First Round	Massachusetts	L, 12–13 (ot)
2017	#5	Second Round; Quarterfinal	Cornell #4 Penn State	W, 11–9; L, 12–14
2018	–	First Round; Second Round	Syracuse #4 Boston College	W, 12–11 (2ot); L, 10–16
2019	#7	First Round; Second Round; Quarterfinal	Wagner; Loyola (MD) #2 Boston College	W, 19–7; W, 17–13; L, 12–17
2022	–	First Round; Second Round	Massachusetts #5 Syracuse	W, 15–9; L, 9–13
2024	–	First Round; Second Round	Drexel #2 Boston College	W, 14–9; L, 16–21
2025	–	First Round; Second Round; Quarterfinal	Massachusetts #8 Johns Hopkins #1 North Carolina	W, 19–10; W, 18–12; L, 10–19
2026	–	First Round	Rutgers	L, 11–12
