= 1994 NCAA Division I women's lacrosse tournament =

- Dates: May 1994
- Teams: 6
- Finals site: Byrd Stadium; College Park, MD
- Champions: Princeton (1st title)
- Runner-up: Maryland (7th title game)
- Attendance: 2,859 finals

The 1994 NCAA Division I Women's Lacrosse Championship was the 13th annual single-elimination tournament to determine the national champion of Division I NCAA women's college lacrosse. The championship game was played at Byrd Stadium in College Park, Maryland during May 1994. All NCAA Division I women's lacrosse programs were eligible for this championship; a total of 6 teams were invited to participate.

Princeton defeated Maryland, 10–7, to win their first national championship.

The leading scorer for the tournament, with 10 goals, was Kelly Amonte from Maryland. The Most Outstanding Player trophy was not awarded this year.

== Teams ==
School	Record
Harvard	11-3
Loyola (MD)	15-2
Maryland	11-0
Princeton	14-1
Virginia	12-3
William & Mary	11-5

== Tournament bracket ==
First Round
Loyola (MD)	9
Harvard	4
Virginia	8
William & Mary	4

Semifinals
Maryland	19
Loyola (MD)	4
Princeton (OT)	14
Virginia	13

Finals; Byrd Stadium; College Park, MD
Maryland	7
Princeton	10

== Tournament outstanding players ==
- Kelly Amonte, Maryland
- Betsy Elder, Maryland
- Laura Harmon, Maryland
- Theresa Ingram, Maryland
- Patty Parichy, Maryland
- Jenny Bristow, Princeton
- Cherie Greer, Virginia
- Abigail Gutstein, Princeton
- Erin O'Neill, Princeton

== See also ==
- NCAA Division I Women's Lacrosse Championship
- NCAA Division III Women's Lacrosse Championship
- 1994 NCAA Division I Men's Lacrosse Championship
