= Big Ten Conference women's lacrosse =

Starting with the 2014–2015 season, the Big Ten sponsored women's lacrosse as a league sport. The inaugural season consisted of teams from Northwestern, Maryland, Michigan, Ohio State, Penn State, and Rutgers.

Johns Hopkins joined the Big Ten for the 2017 season. The Blue Jays men's program started Big Ten play in the conference's inaugural 2015 season.
