= Shannon Smith (lacrosse) =

American lacrosse player

- Born: West Babylon, New York, US
- Education: BS, 2012, Northwestern University
- Occupation: Head coach of Hofstra Pride's Women's Lacrosse team

Shannon Elizabeth Smith is an American lacrosse coach and former player. Smith concluded her collegiate career at Northwestern University as their all-time leading goal scorer with 254, three-time IWLCA first-team All-American, three-time All-ALC first-team choice, and a two-time MVP of the NCAA Championship.

== Early life and education ==
Smith was born to parents Bill and Patty in West Babylon, New York, US. Growing up, she was a multi-sport athlete but only began playing lacrosse during middle school after a family friend needed an extra player for a game. In spite of this, she qualified for West Babylon High School's varsity lacrosse team as a seventh-grader. As a sophomore, Smith set a new state record with 129 goals and 67 assists during the 2006 season.

During her senior year, Smith recorded 13 goals in one game, ranking second behind Shari Maslin of Clarkstown North for the highest single-game total in state history. She finished her senior year with 93 goals and 23 assists, becoming the only player in state history to reach 500 goals. Throughout her school career, she was a six-time letter-winner and set New York state records for goals and points in lacrosse. Smith was also a member of the 2005 NYS National School Girls Team and United States' Under 19 team which competed at the 2007 World Championships.

== Career ==
=== Collegiate ===
Upon graduating high school, Smith enrolled at Northwestern University and competed with the Northwestern Wildcats women's lacrosse team with a Division I scholarship. As a freshman, she started in all 23 games for the Wildcats and ranked fifth on the team with 33 goals. At the conclusion of the year, she was named to the Womenslacrosse.com All-Rookie Team and was invited to the United States Women's Lacrosse Developmental Team.

The following year, Smith recorded 69 goals and 102 points on the year, both of which were the seventh-highest single-season totals in program history. As a result, she earned a first-team IWLCA All-American selection and All-America selection by both WomensLax.com and WomensLacrosse.com. In her junior year, Smith scored 78 goals and 41 assists to lead Division I in total points, points per game and total goals. As a result, she became the third Northwestern player in the past six years to win the Tewaaraton Award as women's lacrosse National Player of the Year. At the time of winning the award, she led the nation in points and goals, setting a Northwestern single-season record for the latter.

In 2012, Smith helped the Wildcats win their seventh championship title in eight years by defeating Syracuse University 8–6. Following this, she became the school's all-time leading goal scorer and was named the NCAA championship MVP for the second straight season. Smith concluded her collegiate career at Northwestern as their all-time leading goal scorer with 254, three-time IWLCA first-team All-American, three-time All-ALC first-team choice, and a two-time MVP of the NCAA Championship.

=== Coaching ===
Following Northwestern, Smith considered attending graduate school or pursuing a job on Wall Street but instead accepted the head coaching position with the Hofstra Pride's Women's Lacrosse team. During her first year with the team, Smith was named the head coach for the 2012 Under Armour All-America Lacrosse Classic. Within her first three years in this position, she led the Pride to 26 wins including appearances in the Colonial Athletic Association Championship tournament. In 2015, Smith lead the Pride to an 11-win season and a regular season Colonial Athletic Association (CAA) title.

As a result of her lacrosse play, Smith was inducted into the Suffolk Sports Hall of Fame, West Babylon Hall of Fame, and Northwestern Hall of Fame.
