= 2012 NCAA Division I women's lacrosse tournament =

- Dates: May 12–27, 2012
- Teams: 16
- Finals site: LaValle Stadium, Stony Brook, New York
- Champions: Northwestern (7th title)
- Runner-up: Syracuse
- MOP: Shannon Smith, Northwestern

The 2012 NCAA Division I Women's Lacrosse Championship was the thirty-first annual single-elimination tournament to determine the national championship for National Collegiate Athletic Association (NCAA) Division I women's college lacrosse. The tournament began with first-round play on May 12, and concluded with the championship game played at Kenneth P. LaValle Stadium of Stony Brook University in Stony Brook, New York, on May 27, 2012. The Northwestern Wildcats were the 2012 NCAA Tournament champions.

== Dates and locations ==
The NCAA Tournament's eight first-round games were played Saturday, May 12, and Sunday, May 13, and the four quarterfinal games were played Saturday, May 19, and Sunday, May 20. The tournament's first-round and quarterfinal games were played on the home fields of the higher seeded teams. The winners of the four quarterfinal games advanced to the two semifinal games played on May 25 and hosted by Stony Brook University at LaValle Stadium, the home field of the Stony Brook Seawolves football and lacrosse teams. The tournament championship game was played at LaValle Stadium on May 27.

== Tournament field ==
The NCAA Division I Women's Lacrosse Committee selected sixteen teams to compete in the 2012 Division I women's lacrosse tournament. Eight teams were selected on an "automatic qualifier" basis. The tournament champions of five conferences, including the America East Conference, the American Lacrosse Conference (ALC), the Atlantic Coast Conference (ACC), the Big East Conference and the Ivy League, received automatic invitations to the NCAA Tournament. These five teams included the Albany Great Danes of the America East, the No. 1 seed Florida Gators of the ALC, the No. 3 seed Maryland Terrapins of the ACC, the No. 6 seed Loyola Greyhounds of the Big East, and the Dartmouth Big Green of the Ivy League.

In addition, three play-in games were held to determine the last three automatic qualifiers. The champions of the Patriot League, the Mountain Pacific Sports Federation, the Colonial Athletic Association (CAA), the Northeast Conference (NEC), the Atlantic 10 Conference, and the Metro Atlantic Athletic Conference (MAAC) competed in the play-in games. The Patriot League's Navy Midshipmen defeated the Oregon Ducks of the Mountain Pacific, the CAA's Towson Tigers beat the NEC's Monmouth Hawks, and the Atlantic 10's UMass Minutemen defeated the Canisius Golden Griffins of the MAAC, with the winners receiving the final three automatic qualifier bids.

The remaining eight tournament teams were chosen by the NCAA tournament selection committee on an at-large basis; the factors considered by the selection committee included: (1) the NCAA's ratings percentage index (RPI); (2) results against common opponents; (3) significant wins and losses; and (4) evaluation of the ten highest-rated teams on a team's schedule, as defined by strength of schedule and winning percentage. The eight at-large teams selected by the committee were the No. 2 seed Northwestern Wildcats, No. 4 seed Syracuse Orange, No. 5 seed North Carolina Tar Heels, and No. 7 seed Duke Blue Devils, as well as the unseeded Notre Dame Fighting Irish, Penn Quakers, Penn State Nittany Lions, and Virginia Cavaliers.

Eight conferences placed member teams in the 2012 tournament, but four conferences dominated the selections, garnering twelve invitations in the sixteen-team field. The ACC received four bids (Maryland, North Carolina, Duke, and Virginia), the ALC got three (Florida, Northwestern, Penn State), the Big East also received three (Syracuse, Loyola, Notre Dame), and the Ivy League got two (Dartmouth, Penn). The ACC, ALC and Big East also dominated the tournament seeding, with member teams receiving the top seven seeds.

=== Play-in games ===
May 5
Navy (Patriot, 17–2)	10
Oregon (MPSF, 14–4)	9

May 5
Towson (CAA, 15–3)	15
Monmouth (NEC, 9–10)	5

May 6
Massachusetts (A-10, 18–1)	13
Canisius (MAAC, 10–8)	12

=== Teams ===
Seed	School	Conference	Berth type	RPI	Record
1	Florida	ALC	Automatic	2	17–2
2	Northwestern	ALC	At-large	1	17–2
3	Maryland	ACC	Automatic	4	17–3
4	Syracuse	Big East	At-large	3	16–3
5	North Carolina	ACC	At-large	5	14–3
6	Loyola (MD)	Big East	Automatic	10	13–5
7	Duke	ACC	At-large	7	11–6
8	Towson	CAA	Automatic	8	16–3
	Albany	America East	Automatic	29	12–5
	Dartmouth	Ivy League	Automatic	12	12–4
	Massachusetts	Atlantic 10	Automatic	6	19–1
	Navy	Patriot League	Automatic	13	18–2
	Notre Dame	Big East	At-large	11	13–4
	Penn	Ivy League	At-large	14	9–7
	Penn State	ALC	At-large	17	11–6
	Virginia	ACC	At-large	9	11–7

== Tournament bracket ==
The 2012 NCAA Tournament bracket consisted of sixteen teams, eight of whom were seeded No. 1 through No. 8. In the first round of the tournament, each of the eight seeded teams was paired with one of the eight unseeded teams.

First Round; May 12–13
1	Florida	6
Albany	4
Penn State	15
8	Towson	8
5	North Carolina	14
Navy	7
Dartmouth	5
4	Syracuse	15
3	Maryland	15
Massachusetts	12
Penn	9
6	Loyola	10
7	Duke	11
Virginia	9
Notre Dame	7
2	Northwestern	12

Quarterfinals; May 19–20
1	Florida	15
Penn State	2
5	North Carolina	16
4	Syracuse	17
3	Maryland	17
6	Loyola	11
7	Duke	7
2	Northwestern	12

Semifinals; May 25
1	Florida	13
4	Syracuse	14
3	Maryland	7
2	Northwestern	9

Final; May 27
4	Syracuse	6
2	Northwestern	8

== See also ==
- NCAA Division I Women's Lacrosse Championship
- 2012 NCAA Division I Men's Lacrosse Championship
