= Kristen Kjellman =

American women's lacrosse player (born 1984)

Kristen Kjellman (born November 18, 1984) is an American women's lacrosse player. She played for the Northwestern Wildcats and the USA World Cup Team.

== Early life ==
Kjellman was born in Boston, Massachusetts and raised in Westwood, MA, and attended Westwood High School from 1999-2003. She was a four-year varsity letter winner in soccer, basketball and lacrosse.

== Career ==
Kjellman was recruited in 2003 by Kelly Amonte Hiller, head coach of the Northwestern Wildcats women's lacrosse team, Kjellman made her debut in 2004, starting all 18 games for the Wildcats. She was named Inside Lacrosse National Rookie of the Year, Co-National Rookie of the Year, and led Northwestern with 53 goals, winning 3 straight national championships from 2005-2007. Kjellman was the first lacrosse player (men or women) to be named the Tewaaraton Trophy winner in consecutive seasons. She led the team to a 77-5 record during her career and was arguably the catalyst to Northwestern's dynasty in Women's lacrosse. While at Northwestern, she won the Honda Sports Award as the nation's best female lacrosse player three consecutive years, in 2005, 2006 and 2007.

She graduated in 2007 and now lives and works in Chicago as a Sales Representative for Nike Lacrosse. In 2008 Kjellman was named the National Rookie of the Year for Nike Sales. 2010 will mark her 4th year as a US National Team member. The draw specialist made her first World Cup appearance in the 2009 World Championships in Prague. The team reached the finals and beat Australia 8-7 in an amazing championship game. Kjellman had a goal, an assist and several key draw controls in the final match. She was named to the All-World team as a midfielder. Since her college debut in 2003, Kjellman has graced the covers of numerous publications, including Sports Illustrated, SI on Campus, Inside Lacrosse and the New England Lacrosse Journal.

== Awards and accomplishments ==
- Inside Lacrosse National Rookie of the Year- 2007.
- Tewaaraton Trophy- 2006, 2007.
- Four-year All-America choice.
- Three-time American Lacrosse Conference (ALC) Player of the Year.
- Three-time National Midfielder of the Year.
- All-time Northwestern record for goals (250) and points (349).
- NCAA record with 39 career goals in NCAA Championship play.
- Three-time Honda Sports Award winner for lacrosse.
- Member of the U.S. National Elite team, 2007.
- Gold medalist in the 2009 World Cup, 2009.
- All-World team midfielder, 2009.
