= Jen Adams =

All-American lacrosse player

Current position
- Title: Head coach
- Team: Loyola

Biographical details
- Born: 19 August 1980 (age 46); Adelaide, South Australia

Playing career
- 1998–2001: Maryland
- Position: Attack

Coaching career (HC unless noted)
- 2004 2006: Denver (asst.)
- 2007 2008: Maryland (assoc. HC)
- 2009 present: Loyola

Head coaching record
- Overall: 22–13

Accomplishments and honors

Awards
- Tewaaraton Trophy (2001); 3× National Attacker of the Year (1999, 2000, 2001); 2× ACC Female Athlete of the Year (2000, 2001); Honda Award (2001); National Lacrosse Hall of Fame (2012)

Jen Adams (born 1980) is the head women's lacrosse coach at Loyola University Maryland and was an All-American lacrosse player at the University of Maryland from 1998 to 2001, leading the Terrapins to national titles for four straight years, including a perfect 21 and 0 record in 1999, as well as a perfect 23 and 0 record in 2001. Maryland under coach Cindy Timchal won seven national titles in a row from 1995 through 2001. The Maryland lacrosse team has more Women's Division I lacrosse titles (14) than any other program. In the 2000 NCAA Lacrosse championship game, Adams scored five goals and had five assists, all in the second half, to turn a close game into a 16–8 victory over Princeton. While at Maryland, Adams was the first recipient of the Honda Award for women's lacrosse, awarded to the top player in a Division I school.

== Biography ==
Adams, born in Adelaide, South Australia, began her lacrosse career with the Brighton Lacrosse Club. She first represented Australia as a 15-year-old in the U19 world championship winning team of 1995. She has gone on to represent Australia at the senior level, including captaining them to the Women's Lacrosse World Cup title in 2005. Adams also played for the Australian team at the 2009 Women's Lacrosse World Cup in Prague.

Adams is ranked second all-time in NCAA women's lacrosse scoring with 445 career points, (267 goals and 178 assists in 86 games). Adams was a three-time national player of the year and was the first-ever winner of the Tewaaraton Trophy, given annually to the nation's top player. She is regarded as the finest female lacrosse player of all time.

In between stints with the Koalas, she has played independent club lacrosse in Baltimore, and was the only woman ever drafted into the National Lacrosse League with the Washington Power. She also was selected to try to jumpstart a women's professional league in 2001, but it did not get beyond a series of summer exhibition games.

After assistant coaching stints with Denver University and the University of Maryland, Adams was hired in June 2008 as head coach of the Greyhounds. In 2009, Loyola had an 11–6 record including wins over top 20 teams Georgetown and Cornell. The team finished the year fourth in the Big East.

In 2016, she was named first-ever head coach of the Baltimore Ride, who participated in the inaugural season of the United Women's Lacrosse League.

== Statistics ==
=== University of Maryland ===
Season	GP	G	A	Pts	PPG
1998	21	27	17	44	–
1999	21	71	46	117	5.57
2000	22	81	55	136	6.18
2001	22	88	60	148	6.73
Totals	86	267	178	445	5.17

== National team ==
As of 2019, she has been head coach of the Australian U19 women's national lacrosse team.
