= American Lacrosse Conference =

US college women's lacrosse conference

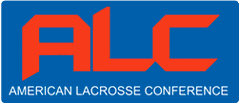
- Association: NCAA
- Founded: 2001
- Folded: 2014
- Sports fielded: 1; men's: 0; women's: 1
- Division: Division I
- No. of teams: 7 (final), 9 (total)
- Headquarters: Erie, Pennsylvania
- Region: Eastern United States

The American Lacrosse Conference (ALC) was a women's lacrosse-only college athletic conference whose members competed at the Division I level of the National Collegiate Athletic Association (NCAA). All of the ALC's members throughout its history were located in the eastern half of the United States. The conference was founded in 2001 in advance of the 2002 NCAA lacrosse season with seven members; nine schools were members at one time or another during its history.

In 2009–10, two more Southeastern Conference universities joined the ALC: South Carolina and Florida. The South Carolina program was eventually delayed with no timetable to begin play. In 2011 it was announced that the conference would add Michigan as the seventh member. The Wolverines began NCAA competition in 2013–14, after transitioning the program from club to varsity status.

Starting with the 2015 season, Michigan, Ohio State, Penn State, and Northwestern joined Maryland and Rutgers in the new Big Ten women's lacrosse league, and Johns Hopkins' women's lacrosse team went independent. In April 2014 it was announced that the two remaining programs, Florida and Vanderbilt, would be joining the Big East Conference as affiliate members in 2015, leaving the 2014 season as the last in American Lacrosse Conference history.

== Final members ==
In its final season, the ALC had seven members in the Eastern United States:

Institution	Nickname	Location	Founded	Affiliation	Enrollment	New lacrosse conference	Current lacrosse conference
University of Florida	Gators	Gainesville, Florida	1853	Public	51,413	Big East	The American
Johns Hopkins University	Blue Jays	Baltimore, Maryland	1876	Private	6,025	Independent	Big Ten
University of Michigan	Wolverines	Ann Arbor, Michigan	1817	Public	37,197	Big Ten	
Northwestern University	Wildcats	Evanston, Illinois	1851	Private	13,407	Big Ten	
Ohio State University	Buckeyes	Columbus, Ohio	1870	Public	51,818	Big Ten	
Pennsylvania State University	Nittany Lions	State College, Pennsylvania	1855	Public	41,289	Big Ten	
Vanderbilt University	Commodores	Nashville, Tennessee	1873	Private	11,500	Big East	The American

=== Former members ===
Schools that left the ALC before 2014 include Davidson College in Davidson, North Carolina and Ohio University in Athens, Ohio. Davidson later moved to the National Lacrosse Conference, still later became an associate member of the Big South Conference, and now houses its women's lacrosse team with most of its other sports in the Atlantic 10 Conference. Ohio University exited the ALC when the OU Athletics Department decided to drop several sports programs including women's lacrosse in January 2007.

=== Membership timeline ===
Years listed in this timeline are lacrosse seasons. Since NCAA lacrosse for both men and women is a spring sport, the year of joining is the calendar year before the first season.

== Championship history ==
Year	Regular season	Record	Tournament championship
2002	Vanderbilt	6–0	not held
2003	Ohio State / Penn State	5–1	not held
2004	Vanderbilt / Northwestern	5–1	not held
2005	Northwestern	6–0	not held
2006	Northwestern	5–0	not held
2007	Northwestern	4–0	Northwestern 22, Johns Hopkins 6
2008	Northwestern	4–0	Northwestern 14, Vanderbilt 3
2009	Northwestern	4–0	Northwestern 13, Penn State 3
2010	Northwestern	5–0	Northwestern 23, Vanderbilt 14
2011	Florida	5–0	Northwestern 10, Florida 9
2012	Florida	5–0	Florida 14, Northwestern 7
2013	Florida / Northwestern / Penn State	4–1	Northwestern 8, Florida 3
2014	Florida	6–0	Florida 9, Northwestern 8
