= NCAA Division I Women's Lacrosse Championship bids by school =

This is a list of NCAA Women's Division I Lacrosse Championship bids by school, as of the end of the 2026 season. Schools whose names are italicized are not currently in Division I and cannot be included in the tournament. There are currently 29 bids for the tournament each year (15 automatic, 14 at-large). Previous sizes include 16 (2001–12), 12 (1983–84, 1998-2000), 8 (1997), 6 (1986–96), 4 (1985), and 2 (1982). The 2020 tournament was cancelled due to the COVID-19 pandemic in the United States.

Play-in games were held from 2004–12. These games are not counted in this list, as the NCAA's record book does not mention them.

== Bids ==
						Last appearance by round			
Bids	School	Conference	Years	Last bid	Last win	QF	SF	F	Title (#)
41	Maryland	Big Ten	1983-87, 1990-2019, 2021-	2026	2026	2026	2026	2019	2019 (14)
37	Virginia	Atlantic Coast	1986-87, 1989–94, 1996-2019, 2021-25	2025	2025	2019	2014	2007	2004 (3)
31	Princeton	Ivy	1983, 1989, 1992–96, 1998-2009, 2011, 2013–19, 2022, 2024-	2026	2025	2025	2004	2004	2003 (3)
27	Loyola (MD)	Patriot	1983-84, 1990, 1994, 1996-2004, 2011–16, 2018–19, 2021-	2026	2024	2023	2003	1997	
27	North Carolina	Atlantic Coast	1997-2002, 2005–19, 2021-	2026	2026	2026	2026	2026	2025 (4)
27	Northwestern	Big Ten	1983-84, 1986–88, 2004–19, 2021-	2026	2026	2026	2026	2026	2026 (9)
27	Penn State	Big Ten	1983-93, 1995–97, 1999, 2001, 2005, 2012–18, 2023-24, 2026	2026	2017	2017	2017	1989	1989 (2)
23	Duke	Atlantic Coast	1998-2016, 2021-22, 2024-25	2025	2025	2025	2015		
23	Syracuse	Atlantic Coast	2000-03, 2005, 2007–10, 2012-19, 2021-	2026	2026	2024	2024	2021	
22	James Madison	American	1995, 1997-2001, 2003–04, 2006, 2010–11, 2015–19, 2021-	2026	2026	2023	2018	2018	2018 (1)
18	Notre Dame	Atlantic Coast	2002, 2004, 2006, 2008–10, 2012–17, 2019, 2021-24, 2026-	2026	2024	2023	2006		
18	Penn	Ivy	1983-84, 2007–19, 2023-25	2025	2025	2025	2009	2008	
18	Temple	American	1983-90, 1992, 1995, 1997–98, 2001–04, 2008, 2021	2021	2021	1998	1997	1988	1988 (2)
16	Georgetown	Big East	1998-2006, 2008–10, 2013–14, 2018–19	2019	2019	2006	2004	2002	
16	Massachusetts	MAC	1982-84, 2009, 2011–17, 2021-23, 2025-	2026	2017	2016	1984	1982	1982 (1)
15	Dartmouth	Ivy	1983, 1993, 1995, 1998-2001, 2003–06, 2011–13, 2019	2019	2013	2006	2006	2006	
15	Florida	Big 12	2011-19, 2021-	2026	2025	2025	2025		
14	Boston College	Atlantic Coast	2011, 2013–19, 2021-	2026	2026	2025	2025	2024	2024 (2)
14	Johns Hopkins	Big Ten	2004-05, 2007, 2014–16, 2018-19, 2021-	2026	2026	2026	2026		
14	Stanford	Atlantic Coast	2006, 2010–11, 2013–16, 2018-19, 2021-22, 2024-	2026	2026	2026			
13	Stony Brook	CAA	2013-19, 2021-	2026	2026	2026			
11	Towson	CAA	2005, 2008–10, 2012–14, 2016-18, 2021	2021	2018				
10	Denver	Big East	2013-14, 2018–19, 2021-	2026	2026	2023	2023		
10	Fairfield	MAAC	2009, 2015, 2018–19, 2021-	2026					
10	Jacksonville	Atlantic Sun	2013-15, 2017–19, 2021-23, 2026	2026	2022				
9	Harvard	Ivy	1983-84, 1988–94	1994	1993	1993	1993	1992	1990 (1)
9	Navy	Patriot	2010-13, 2017–19, 2025–	2026	2026	2026	2017		
8	Boston University	Patriot	2000, 2003, 2005–10	2010	2008	2008			
8	Mercer	Big South	2018-19, 2021-	2026					
7	New Hampshire	America East	1984-87, 1991, 2004, 2008	2008	1991	1991	1991	1985	1985 (1)
7	Richmond	Atlantic 10	2005-07, 2018–19, 2023-24	2024	2023				
7	UAlbany	America East	2011-12, 2015, 2017, 2023, 2025-	2026	2023	2011			
7	Vanderbilt	American	2002, 2004, 2007–10, 2021	2021	2004	2004	2004		
7	William & Mary	CAA	1983, 1988, 1994, 1996–98, 2001	2001		1997			
6	High Point	Big South	2013-14, 2017–19, 2021	2021	2017				
6	Michigan	Big Ten	2019, 2022-	2026	2026	2024			
6	USC	Big Ten	2015-17, 2019, 2022-23	2023	2017	2017			
6	Yale	Ivy	1984, 2003, 2007, 2024-	2026	2025	2025			
5	Cornell	Ivy	2001-02, 2006, 2016–17	2017	2017	2002	2002		
4	Canisius	MAAC	2013-14, 2016–17	2017					
4	Colgate	Patriot	2004-05, 2008–09	2009					
4	Colorado	Big 12	2017-19, 2026	2026	2026	2026			
4	Connecticut	Big East	2013, 2021-23	2023					
4	Drexel	CAA	2021-24	2024					
4	Lafayette	Patriot	1988-89, 1991, 2002	2002		1991	1988		
4	Louisville	Atlantic Coast	2014-17	2017	2014				
4	Mount St. Mary's	MAAC	2004-05, 2021-22	2022					
4	Ohio State	Big Ten	2002-03, 2014–15	2015	2003	2003			
4	Rutgers	Big Ten	1999, 2021-22, 2026	2026	2026				
3	Army	Patriot	2023, 2025-	2026	2026				
3	Bryant	America East	2014-15, 2017	2017					
3	Delaware	Atlantic Sun	1983-84, 2000	2000	1984	1984	1984	1983	1983 (1)
3	Hofstra	CAA	2001, 2007, 2021	2021					
3	Le Moyne	Northeast	2002-03, 2007	2007					
3	Monmouth	CAA	2001, 2006, 2013	2013					
3	Wagner	Northeast	2016, 2018–19	2019	2019				
2	Central Michigan	MAC	2022-23	2023					
2	Clemson	Atlantic Coast	2025-	2026	2026				
2	Holy Cross	Patriot	2006-07	2007					
2	LIU	Northeast	2024-25	2025					
2	Robert Morris	MAC	2021, 2024	2024					
2	UMBC	America East	2002-03	2003					
2	West Chester	n/a	1998-99	1999					
2	Winthrop	Big South	2015-16	2016					
1	Akron	MAC	2025	2025					
1	American	Patriot	2003	2003					
1	Binghamton	America East	2024	2024					
1	Brown	Ivy	2025	2025					
1	Coastal Carolina	Atlantic Sun	2024	2024					
1	Davidson	Atlantic 10	2026	2026					
1	Elon	CAA	2017	2017					
1	Lehigh	Patriot	1984	1984	1984	1984			
1	Liberty	Atlantic Sun	2025	2025					
1	Marist	MAAC	2010	2010					
1	Marquette	Big East	2023	2023					
1	Niagara	MAAC	2024	2024					
1	Old Dominion	American	2016	2016					
1	Sacred Heart	MAAC	2023	2023					
1	Saint Joseph's	Atlantic 10	2022	2022					
1	Stonehill	Northeast	2026	2026					
1	TCNJ	n/a	1982	1982				1982	
1	Vermont	America East	2022	2022					
1	Virginia Tech	Atlantic Coast	2018	2018	2018				
