= Cindy Timchal =

American lacrosse coach (born 1954)

Personal information
- Nationality: American

Sport
- NCAA team: West Chester University

Cindy Timchal is an American lacrosse coach. She is the head women's lacrosse coach at the United States Naval Academy. She has coached for some of the top programs in college women's lacrosse, including Northwestern University, University of Maryland. At Maryland Timchal coached the Terrapins to seven straight NCAA Division I Women's Lacrosse Championships.

== Background ==
Timchal grew up in Havertown, Pennsylvania, and despite not playing lacrosse in high school, Timchal went on to play on the lacrosse team at West Chester University. While at West Chester, Timchal was also a member of the Tennis and Track and Field teams. After graduating college, Timchal got her first coaching job at Unionville High School in Kennett Square, Pennsylvania, where she was a member of the coaching staff for the lacrosse, field hockey, and basketball teams. In 1979, after coaching for two years at Unionville, Timchal began her college coaching career at The University of Pennsylvania, where she was an assistant for the lacrosse and field hockey teams.

== Coaching at Northwestern ==
Timchal's head coaching career started in 1982 when she took on the program at Northwestern University. She stayed with the Wildcats for nine years, coaching them to five NCAA Tournament appearances in 1983, 1984, 1986, 1987, and 1988. Timchal's record at Northwestern was 76–40. She posted a winning season for eight out of her nine seasons.

== Coaching at Maryland ==
In 1991, Timchal left Northwestern to pursue her coaching career at the University of Maryland. Although Maryland had a history of being a powerhouse in lacrosse, the Terps only had one NCAA title which they won in 1986. In just her first season as head coach, Timchal led her team to an NCAA final as well as a 14–3 record before they lost to Virginia in the NCAA championship. The next season, 1992, Maryland would make it to the finals, where they would defeat Harvard 11–10 in overtime as Timchal would gain her first national championship.

Following Maryland's loss to Princeton in the 1994 finals, Maryland went on a 50-game winning streak. This would take place during Maryland's seven-year reign as national champions from 1995 to 2001. This included a 13-5 national championship win over Princeton in 1995. The seven-season championship streak was completed with the 2001 title game, in which Maryland posted a perfect 23–0 season and defeated Georgetown in triple overtime.

Overall, Timchal's record at Maryland was 260-46 and her winning percentage was 85%.

== Coaching at Navy ==
On August 5, 2006, Timchal was named the head coach for the women's lacrosse team at the United States Naval Academy. Timchal was given the opportunity by athletic director Chet Gladchuk to become the first women's lacrosse coach as Navy decided to elevate its club program to the Division I level. Gladchuck described Timchal as "the finest coach in the history of the game".

In 2010, Navy broke out, going 17-4 while capturing their first Patriot League title and their first NCAA tournament appearance. It took only three years for Navy to achieve an NCAA appearance, the fastest a new team had qualified in 13 years. Their success in 2010 left Navy ranked 19th nationally.

== Awards and achievements ==
The following awards and achievements were listed on gonavy.com:

- Two-time National Coach of the Year
- 8 NCAA Championships- the 25th most all-time in any sport by a coach and fourth most in a women's sport in NCAA history
- 7 consecutive NCAA Championships (1995–2001)- tied for the seventh most in any sport in NCAA Division I history and third most in a women's sport
- 394 victories, which is the most in NCAA history for any division
- A career winning percentage of .790
- 499 games coached which is the second most in NCAA history
- The most NCAA tournament appearances with 23 NCAA Tournament appearances
- Only coach in NCAA history to lead three different teams to NCAA Tournament
- 18 NCAA quarterfinal appearances
- Has coached 54 different players who received 96 All-America honors
- Four-time ACC Coach of the Year
- Inducted into the Delaware County sports hall of fame

In 2012, Timchal was inducted into the National Lacrosse Hall of Fame.

== Head coaching record ==
Record table
Season	Team	Overall	Conference	Standing	Postseason
Northwestern Wildcats (NCAA independent) (1982–1990)
1982	Northwestern	8–3			
1983	Northwestern	11–3			NCAA first round
1984	Northwestern	10–4			NCAA quarterfinals
1985	Northwestern	7–4			
1986	Northwestern	10–4			NCAA Division I quarterfinals
1987	Northwestern	10–4			NCAA Division I quarterfinals
1988	Northwestern	10–5			NCAA Division I quarterfinals
1989	Northwestern	6–5			
1990	Northwestern	4–8			
Northwestern:		76–40 (.655)			
Maryland Terrapins (NCAA independent) (1991–1996)
1991	Maryland	14–3			NCAA Division I runner-up
1992	Maryland	14–1			NCAA Division I champion
1993	Maryland	12–2			NCAA Division I semifinals
1994	Maryland	12–1			NCAA Division I runner-up
1995	Maryland	17–0			NCAA Division I champion
1996	Maryland	19–0			NCAA Division I champion
Maryland Terrapins (Atlantic Coast Conference) (1997–2006)
1997	Maryland	21–1	3–0	1st	NCAA Division I champion
1998	Maryland	18–3	1–2	T–2nd	NCAA Division I champion
1999	Maryland	21–0	3–0	1st	NCAA Division I champion
2000	Maryland	21–1	2–1	T–1st	NCAA Division I champion
2001	Maryland	23–0	3–0	1st	NCAA Division I champion
2002	Maryland	11–10	0–3	4th	NCAA Division I quarterfinals
2003	Maryland	18–4	3–0	1st	NCAA Division I semifinals
2004	Maryland	15–5	1–2	3rd	NCAA Division I quarterfinals
2005	Maryland	12–7	2–2	T–2nd	NCAA Division I first round
2006	Maryland	12–8	2–3	4th	NCAA Division I first round
Maryland:		260–46 (.850)	20–13 (.606)		
Navy Midshipmen (Patriot League) (2008–present)
2008	Navy	13–4	4–2	T–2nd	
2009	Navy	13–5	4–2	T–2nd	
2010	Navy	17–4	5–1	T–1st	NCAA Division I first round
2011	Navy	15–6	4–2	3rd	NCAA Division I first round
2012	Navy	18–3	6–0	1st	NCAA Division I first round
2013	Navy	19–2	6–0	1st	NCAA Division I second round
2014	Navy	14–3	6–2	2nd	
2015	Navy	15–5	6–2	T–2nd	
2016	Navy	13–6	7–2	2nd	
2017	Navy	18–5	8–1	2nd	NCAA Division I semifinal
2018	Navy	18–4	8–1	2nd	NCAA Division I quarterfinal
2019	Navy	16–5	8–1	2nd	NCAA Division I second round
2020	Navy	2–4	0–0		Season canceled due to COVID-19
2021	Navy	8–4	4–2	3rd (South)	
2022	Navy	15–5	7–2	T–2nd	
2023	Navy	13–6	6–3	T–3rd	
2024	Navy	15–4	8–1	2nd	
2025	Navy	15–6	7–2	3rd	NCAA Division I first round
Navy:		257–81 (.760)	104–26 (.800)		
Total:		593–167 (.780)			
National champion Postseason invitational champion Conference regular season champion Conference regular season and conference tournament champion Division regular season champion Division regular season and conference tournament champion Conference tournament champion
