= UMass Minutewomen lacrosse =

American college lacrosse team

- Founded: 1976; 50 years ago
- University: University of Massachusetts Amherst
- Head coach: Jana Drummond (4th season)
- Stadium: Garber Field (capacity: 5000)
- Location: Amherst, Massachusetts
- Conference: Mid-American Conference
- Nickname: Minutewomen
- Colors: Maroon and white

NCAA Tournament championships
- 1982

NCAA Tournament Final Fours
- 1982, 1983, 1984

NCAA Tournament appearances
- 1982, 1983, 1984, 2009, 2011, 2012, 2013, 2014, 2015, 2016, 2017, 2021, 2022, 2023, 2025, 2026

Conference Tournament championships
- 2000, 2009, 2010, 2011, 2012, 2013, 2014, 2015, 2016, 2017, 2021, 2025, 2026

Conference regular season championships
- 2000, 2009, 2011, 2012, 2013, 2014, 2015, 2016, 2017, 2018, 2019, 2021, 2022, 2023, 2024, 2025, 2026

The UMass Minutewomen lacrosse team is an NCAA Division I college lacrosse team representing the University of Massachusetts Amherst as part of the Mid-American Conference. They play their home games at Garber Field in Amherst, Massachusetts.

== Individual career records ==
Record	Amount	Player	Years
Goals	247	Kassidy Morris	2021–26
Assists	145	Kaitlyn Cerasi	2017–21
Points	330	Katie Ferris	2011–14
Ground balls	178	Michel Warrington	1994–97
Draw controls	664	Jordan Dean	2021–25
Caused turnovers	115	Kristin St. Hilaire	2002–05
Saves	600	Jen Nardi	1998-01

== Individual single-season records ==
Record	Amount	Player	Years
Goals	78	Kassidy Morris	2025
Assists	56	Fiona McGowan	2024
Points	104	Kassidy Morris	2026
Ground balls	76	Michel Warrington	1996
Draw controls	261	Jordan Dean	2024
Caused turnovers	47	Sarah Crowley	2017
Saves	257	Trish DiBenedetto	1994

== Seasons ==
Record table
Season	Coach	Overall	Conference	Standing	Postseason
USWLA (1976–1979)
1976	Frank Garahan	7–1			
1977	Frank Garahan	10–2–1			
1978	Frank Garahan	20–2–2			
1979	Pam Hixon	15–1			
AIAW (1980–1981)
1980	Pam Hixon	13–2			
1981	Pam Hixon	8–5–1			
NCAA Division I (Independent) (1982–1990)
1982	Pam Hixon	10–0			NCAA Champions
1983	Pam Hixon	12–3–1			NCAA Semifinals
1984	Pam Hixon	9–7			NCAA Semifinals
1985	Pam Hixon	9–3			
1986	Pam Hixon	6–4			
1987	Pam Hixon	9–5			
1988	Patti Bossio	7–7–1			
1989	Patti Bossio	2–11			
1990	Patti Bossio	4–10			
No Team (1991–1992)
NCAA Division I (Independent) (1993–1998)
1993	Karen Marley	0–8			
1994	Francesca McClellan	3–11			
1995	Francesca McClellan	3–10			
1996	Francesca McClellan	4–10			
1997	Francesca McClellan	6–7			
1998	Francesca McClellan	9–6			
NCAA Division I (Atlantic 10 Conference) (1999–2025)
1999	Francesca McClellan	9–6	4–1	2nd	
2000	Phil Barnes	10–7	5–1	T-1st	
2001	Phil Barnes	6–10	3–2	3rd	
2002	Phil Barnes	8–8	5–2	3rd	
2003	Carrie Bolduc	11–8	6–1	T-1st	
2004	Carrie Bolduc	6–10	4–3	T-3rd	
2005	Carrie Bolduc	5–12	1–6	T-7th	
2006	Carrie Bolduc	7–11	4–3	T-4th	
2007	Alexis Venechanos	8–9	3–4	5th	
2008	Alexis Venechanos	7–11	4–3	4th	
2009	Alexis Venechanos	11–8	6–1	1st	NCAA First Round
2010	Alexis Venechanos	10–10	5–2	T-2nd	NCAA Play-in
2011	Angela McMahon	17–3	7–0	1st	NCAA First Round
2012	Angela McMahon	19–2	7–0	1st	NCAA First Round
2013	Angela McMahon	18–3	7–0	1st	NCAA Second Round
2014	Angela McMahon	18–2	7–0	1st	NCAA First Round
2015	Angela McMahon	19–2	8–0	1st	NCAA Second Round
2016	Angela McMahon	20–2	9–0	1st	NCAA Quarterfinal
2017	Angela McMahon	17–4	9–0	1st	NCAA Second Round
2018	Angela McMahon	14–5	8–1	T-1st	
2019	Angela McMahon	15–4	9–0	1st	
2020	Angela McMahon	4–1	0–0		Season suspended (COVID-19)
2021	Angela McMahon	15–3	8–0	T-1st	NCAA First Round
2022	Angela McMahon	16–4	9–0	1st	NCAA First Round
2023	Jana Drummond	16–3	9–0	1st	NCAA First Round
2024	Jana Drummond	13–5	9–0	1st	
2025	Jana Drummond	15–4	10–0	1st	NCAA First Round
NCAA Division I (Mid American Conference) (2026–present)
2026	Jana Drummond	16–3	7–0	1st	NCAA First Round
Total:		501–271–6 (.649)			
National champion Postseason invitational champion Conference regular season champion Conference regular season and conference tournament champion Division regular season champion Division regular season and conference tournament champion Conference tournament champion

== Postseason Results ==
The Minutewomen have appeared in 17 NCAA tournaments, excluding their 2010 play-in game loss, which is not counted as a tournament game in NCAA's record book. Their official postseason record is 11–16.

Year	Seed	Round	Opponent	Score
1982	–	Final	TCNJ	W, 9–6
1983	–	Quarterfinal; Semifinal	Harvard; Temple	W, 7–6; L, 4–10
1984	–	First Round; Quarterfinal; Semifinal	Yale; Harvard; Maryland	W, 6–5 (ot); W, 6–5; L, 3–9
2009	–	First Round	#1 Northwestern	L, 6–23
2010	–	Play-in	Stanford	L, 12–15
2011	–	Play-in; First Round	Canisius #6 Loyola (MD)	W, 16–8; L, 7–14
2012	–	Play-in; First Round	Canisius #3 Maryland	W, 13–12; L, 12–15
2013	–	First Round; Second Round	Connecticut #7 Penn State	W, 14–10; L, 9–12
2014	–	First Round	Loyola (MD)	L, 4–10
2015	–	First Round; Second Round	Jacksonville #1 Maryland	W, 13–8; L, 8–19
2016	–	First Round; Second Round; Quarterfinal	Princeton #8 Cornell #1 Maryland	W, 13–12 (ot); W, 7–6; L, 3–18
2017	–	First Round; Second Round	Colorado; Navy	W, 12–7; L, 11–23
2021	–	First Round	Temple	L, 13–14
2022	–	First Round	Princeton	L, 9–15
2023	–	First Round	Johns Hopkins	L, 8–19
2025	–	First Round	Princeton	L, 10–19
2026	–	First Round	#6 Navy	L, 16–17
