= NCAA Division I women's lacrosse tournament =

Annual american lacrosse tournament

- Current season, competition or edition: 2026 NCAA Division I women's lacrosse tournament
- Association: NCAA
- Sport: Women's college lacrosse
- Founded: 1982; 44 years ago
- Division: Division I
- No. of teams: 29
- Country: United States
- Most recent champion: Northwestern (9th title)
- Most titles: Maryland (14)
- Broadcasters: ESPN, ESPNU, ESPN+
- Website: NCAA.com

The NCAA Division I women's lacrosse tournament is annual single-elimination tournament hosted by the National Collegiate Athletic Association to determine the national champion women's collegiate lacrosse among its Division I members in the United States. It has been held every year since 1982, except for 2020.

The Maryland Terrapins have been the most successful program, with fourteen titles.

Northwestern is the reigning national champions, winning their ninth title in 2026.

== History ==
Lacrosse was one of the twelve women's sports that was added to the NCAA championship program for the 1981–82 school year, as the NCAA engaged in battle with the AIAW for sole governance of women's collegiate sports. The AIAW continued to conduct its established championship program in the same twelve (and other) sports; however, only after a year of dual women's championships, the AIAW held their last championship in 1982 and they ceased operation.

Separate championships are held for Division II, founded in 2001, and Division III, founded in 1985.

== Results ==
See Association for Intercollegiate Athletics for Women Champions for the women's lacrosse champions from 1978 to 1982. NOTE: In 1982 there were both NCAA and AIAW Division I champions.

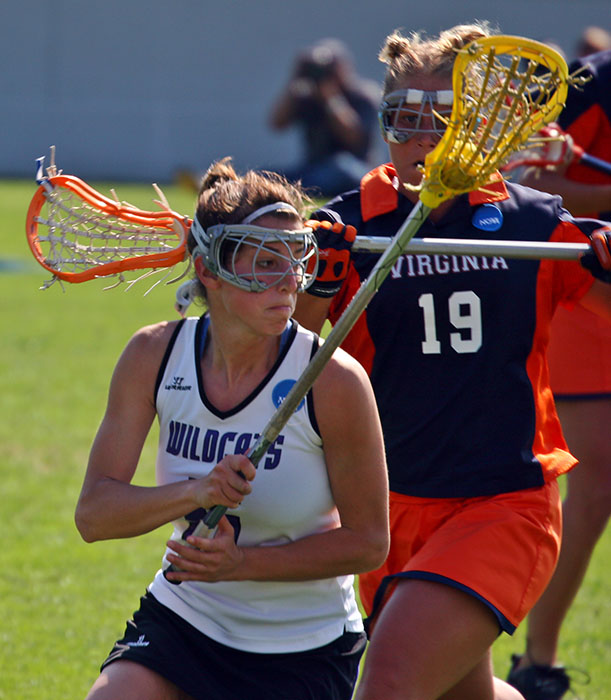
2005 Championship between the Virginia Cavaliers and Northwestern Wildcats

NCAA Division I women's lacrosse tournament
Year	Site	Stadium	Championship Results		
Year	Site	Stadium	Champion	Score	Runner-up
1982; Details	Trenton, NJ (Trenton State)	Lions Stadium	Massachusetts	9–6	Trenton State
1983; Details	Philadelphia, PA (Penn)	Franklin Field	Delaware	10–7	Temple
1984; Details	Boston, MA (Boston U.)	Nickerson Field	Temple	6–4	Maryland
1985; Details	Philadelphia, PA (Penn)	Franklin Field	New Hampshire	6–5	Maryland
1986; Details	College Park, MD (Maryland)	Byrd Stadium	Maryland	6–5	Penn State
1987; Details	College Park, MD (Maryland)	Byrd Stadium	Penn State	7–6	Temple
1988; Details	Haverford, PA (Haverford)	Walton Field	Temple (2)	15–7	Penn State
1989; Details	West Chester, PA (West Chester)	John A. Farrell Stadium	Penn State (2)	7–6	Harvard
1990; Details	Princeton, NJ (Princeton)	Palmer Stadium	Harvard	8–7	Maryland
1991; Details	Trenton, NJ (Trenton State)	Lions Stadium	Virginia	8–6	Maryland
1992; Details	Bethlehem, PA (Lehigh)	Goodman Stadium	Maryland (2)	11–10 (OT)	Harvard
1993; Details	College Park, MD (Maryland)	Byrd Stadium	Virginia (2)	8–6 (OT)	Princeton
1994; Details	College Park, MD (Maryland)	Byrd Stadium	Princeton	10–7	Maryland
1995; Details	Trenton, NJ (Trenton State)	Lions Stadium	Maryland (3)	13–5	Princeton
1996; Details	Bethlehem, PA (Lehigh)	Goodman Stadium	Maryland (4)	10–5	Virginia
1997; Details	Bethlehem, PA (Lehigh)	Goodman Stadium	Maryland (5)	8–7	Loyola (MD)
1998; Details	Catonsville, MD (UMBC)	UMBC Stadium	Maryland (6)	11–5	Virginia
1999; Details	Baltimore, MD (Johns Hopkins)	Homewood Field	Maryland (7)	16–6	Virginia
2000; Details	Trenton, NJ (TCNJ)	Lions Stadium	Maryland (8)	16–8	Princeton
2001; Details	Baltimore, MD (Johns Hopkins)	Homewood Field	Maryland (9)	14–13 (3OT)	Georgetown
2002; Details	Baltimore, MD (Loyola)	Diane Geppi-Aikens Field	Princeton (2)	12–7	Georgetown
2003; Details	Syracuse, NY (Syracuse)	Carrier Dome	Princeton (3)	8–7 (OT)	Virginia
2004; Details	Princeton, NJ (Princeton)	Princeton Stadium	Virginia (3)	10–4	Princeton
2005; Details	Annapolis, MD (Navy)	Navy–Marine Corps Memorial Stadium	Northwestern	13–10	Virginia
2006; Details	Boston, MA (Boston U.)	Nickerson Field	Northwestern (2)	7–4	Dartmouth
2007; Details	Philadelphia, PA (Penn)	Franklin Field	Northwestern (3)	15–13	Virginia
2008; Details	Towson, MD (Towson)	Johnny Unitas Stadium	Northwestern (4)	10–6	Penn
2009; Details	Towson, MD (Towson)	Johnny Unitas Stadium	Northwestern (5)	21–7	North Carolina
2010; Details	Towson, MD (Towson)	Johnny Unitas Stadium	Maryland (10)	13–11	Northwestern
2011; Details	Stony Brook, NY (Stony Brook)	Kenneth P. LaValle Stadium	Northwestern (6)	8–7	Maryland
2012; Details	Stony Brook, NY (Stony Brook)	Kenneth P. LaValle Stadium	Northwestern (7)	8–6	Syracuse
2013; Details	Villanova, PA (Villanova)	Villanova Stadium	North Carolina	13–12 (3OT)	Maryland
2014; Details	Towson, MD (Towson)	Johnny Unitas Stadium	Maryland (11)	15–12	Syracuse
2015; Details	Chester, PA (Saint Joseph's)	PPL Park	Maryland (12)	9–8	North Carolina
2016; Details	Chester, PA (Saint Joseph's)	Talen Energy Stadium	North Carolina (2)	13–7	Maryland
2017; Details	Foxborough, MA (UMass)	Gillette Stadium	Maryland (13)	16–13	Boston College
2018; Details	Stony Brook, NY (Stony Brook)	Kenneth P. LaValle Stadium	James Madison	16–15	Boston College
2019; Details	Baltimore, MD (Johns Hopkins)	Homewood Field	Maryland (14)	12–10	Boston College
2020	Baltimore, MD (Johns Hopkins)	Homewood Field	Canceled due to the COVID-19 pandemic		
2021; Details	Towson, MD (Towson)	Johnny Unitas Stadium	Boston College	16–10	Syracuse
2022; Details	Baltimore, MD (Johns Hopkins)	Homewood Field	North Carolina (3)	12–11	Boston College
2023; Details	Cary, NC (North Carolina)	WakeMed Soccer Park	Northwestern (8)	18–6	Boston College
2024; Details	Cary, NC (North Carolina)	WakeMed Soccer Park	Boston College (2)	14–13	Northwestern
2025; Details	Foxborough, MA (Harvard)	Gillette Stadium	North Carolina (4)	12–8	Northwestern
2026; Details	Evanston, IL (Northwestern)	Martin Stadium	Northwestern (9)	14–11	North Carolina
2027; Details	Chester, PA (Temple)	Subaru Park			
2028; Details	Chester, PA (Temple)	Subaru Park			

== Team titles ==
National Championships by school: 14, 9, 4, 3, 2, 1

Team	Titles	Winning years
Maryland	14	1986, 1992, 1995, 1996, 1997, 1998, 1999, 2000, 2001, 2010, 2014, 2015, 2017, 2019
Northwestern	9	2005, 2006, 2007, 2008, 2009, 2011, 2012, 2023, 2026
North Carolina	4	2013, 2016, 2022, 2025
Virginia	3	1991, 1993, 2004
Princeton	3	1994, 2002, 2003
Temple	2	1984, 1988
Penn State	2	1987, 1989
Boston College	2	2021, 2024
UMass	1	1982
Delaware	1	1983
New Hampshire	1	1985
Harvard	1	1990
James Madison	1	2018

== Results by year ==
- CH National Champion
- RU National Runner-up
- SF Semifinals
- QF Quarterfinals
- 12 16 Round of 12 (1983 through 1984, 1998 through 2000); Round of 16 (2001 through present)
- • First Round (2013 to present)
- ◦ Opening Round (2018 through 2019)
- P Play-in Game (2004 through 2012. Unlike the Opening Round game of 2018 and 2019, the losers of these Play-in Games are not considered by the NCAA to have been NCAA participants. They appear in the table below, but not counted as having an appearance in the total column.)

The NCAA began seeding the top 4 teams in 1998. The No. 1 seed is marked with double underline, and teams seeded between No. 2 and No. 4 are shown with single underline. Starting in 2005, the top 8 teams were seeded. Teams seeded between No. 5 and No. 8 are shown with dotted underline.

School	Current Conference	#	QF	SF	CG	CH	82	83	84	85	86	87	88	89	90	91	92	93	94	95	96	97	98	99	00	01	02	03	04	05	06	07	08	09	10	11	12	13	14	15	16	17	18	19	21	22	23	24	25	26
Maryland	Big Ten	41	36	29	21	14		QF	RU	RU	CH	QF			RU	RU	CH	SF	RU	CH	CH	CH	CH	CH	CH	CH	QF	SF	QF	16	16	QF	QF	SF	CH	RU	SF	RU	CH	CH	RU	CH	SF	CH	16	SF	16	QF	16	SF
Northwestern	Big Ten	27	24	17	12	9		12	QF		QF	QF	QF																QF	CH	CH	CH	CH	CH	RU	CH	CH	SF	SF	QF	16	16	QF	SF	SF	SF	CH	RU	RU	CH
North Carolina	ACC	27	25	15	7	4																SF	SF	12	QF	QF	SF			QF	QF	QF	QF	RU	SF	SF	QF	CH	QF	RU	CH	QF	SF	SF	SF	CH	QF	•	CH	RU
Virginia	ACC	37	22	14	8	3					SF	SF		QF	QF	CH	SF	CH	SF		RU	QF	RU	RU	QF	16	QF	RU	CH	RU	16	RU	16	16	QF	16	16	QF	SF	16	•	16	16	QF	16	16	•	16	16	
Princeton	Ivy League	31	23	11	7	3		QF						SF			SF	RU	CH	RU	SF		QF	QF	RU	SF	CH	CH	RU	QF	QF	16	QF	QF		QF		•	16	QF	•	QF	16	QF		16		16	QF	•
Boston College	ACC	14	9	8	7	2																														16		•	QF	16	•	RU	RU	RU	CH	RU	RU	CH	SF	16
Penn State	Big Ten	27	20	11	4	2		SF	QF	SF	RU	CH	RU	CH	QF	SF	QF	QF		SF	QF	QF		SF		16				16							QF	QF	•	QF	SF	SF	•				•	•		•
Temple	American	18	12	9	4	2		RU	CH	SF	SF	RU	CH	SF	SF		QF			QF		SF	QF			16	16	16	16				16												16					
Harvard	Ivy League	9	9	5	3	1		QF	QF				SF	RU	CH	QF	RU	SF	QF																															
UMass	MAC	16	4	3	1	1	CH	SF	SF																									16	P	16	16	16	•	16	QF	16			•	•	•		•	•
New Hampshire	America East	7	4	3	1	1			12	CH	QF	SF				SF													16				16																	
James Madison	American	22	11	2	1	1														QF		QF	QF	QF	SF	QF		16	QF		QF				QF	16				•	•	16	CH	•	16	16	QF	16	•	16
Delaware	ASUN	3	2	2	1	1		CH	SF																12																									
Syracuse	ACC	23	14	10	3	-																			12	16	16	16		16		QF	SF	QF	SF		RU	SF	RU	SF	SF	16	•	QF	RU	QF	SF	SF	16	16
Georgetown	Big East	16	8	3	2	-																	12	QF	QF	RU	RU	QF	SF	QF	QF		16	16	16			16	16				•	16						
Loyola (MD)	Patriot	27	13	7	1	-		12	12						SF				SF		SF	RU	QF	12	SF	SF	16	SF	16							QF	QF	16	16	QF	•		16	16	16	QF	QF	16	•	•
Dartmouth	Ivy League	15	9	4	1	-		12										QF		SF			SF	QF	12	QF		QF	QF	SF	RU					16	16	16						•						
Penn	Ivy League	18	8	3	1	-		QF	12																							SF	RU	SF	QF	16	16	•	16	16	QF	•	16	•			16	QF	QF	
TCNJ	D3	1	1	1	1	-	RU																																											
Duke	ACC	23	17	7	-	-																	12	SF	QF	QF	QF	16	16	SF	SF	SF	SF	QF	QF	SF	QF	QF	QF	SF	16				QF	16		•	QF	
Florida	Big 12	15	9	3	-	-																														QF	SF	QF	QF	16	16	16	QF	16	QF	QF	16	SF	SF	•
Notre Dame	ACC	18	6	1	-	-																					QF		16		SF		16	QF	16		16	•	16	16	QF	•		16	QF	•	QF	16		•
Navy	Patriot	9	3	1	-	-																													16	16	16	16				SF	QF	16					•	QF
Lafayette	Patriot	4	3	1	-	-							SF	QF		QF											16																							
Johns Hopkins	Big Ten	13	2	1	-	-																							16	16		QF							•	•	16		•	•	•	•	16	16	16	SF
Denver	Big East	10	2	1	-	-																																16	16				16	QF	16	16	SF	16	•	16
Vanderbilt	American	7	1	1	-	-																					16		SF			16	16	16	16										•					
Cornell	Ivy League	5	1	1	-	-																				16	SF				16										16	16								
Stony Brook	CAA	13	5	-	-	-																																16	16	16	16	QF	QF	16	QF	QF	16	16	16	QF
William & Mary	CAA	7	4	-	-	-		12					QF						QF		QF	QF	12			16																								
Yale	Ivy League	6	3	-	-	-			12																			QF				16																QF	QF	•
Boston University	Patriot	8	2	-	-	-																			12			16		QF	16	16	QF	16	16															
USC	Big Ten	6	2	-	-	-																																		16	QF	QF		•		•	•			
Stanford	ACC	14	1	-	-	-																									16				16	16		16	•	•	16		•	•	•	•		•	16	QF
Albany	America East	7	1	-	-	-																														QF	16			•		•					16		•	•
Michigan	Big Ten	6	1	-	-	-																																						16		16	16	QF	16	16
Ohio State	Big Ten	4	1	-	-	-																					16	QF											•	•										
Colorado	Big 12	4	1	-	-	-																																				•	16	16						QF
Lehigh	Patriot	1	1	-	-	-			QF																																									
Towson	CAA	11	-	-	-	-																								16			16	16	16		16	•	•		16	•	16		•					
Fairfield	Metro	10	-	-	-	-																												16						•			•	◦	•	•	•	•	•	•
Jacksonville	ASUN	10	-	-	-	-																																•	•	•		•	•	•	16	16	•			•
Mercer	Big South	8	-	-	-	-																																					◦	◦	•	•	•	•	•	•
Richmond	Atlantic 10	7	-	-	-	-																								16	16	16											•	•			16	•		
High Point	Big South	6	-	-	-	-																																•	•			16	•	•	•					
Rutgers	Big Ten	4	-	-	-	-																		12																					16	16				16
Colgate	Patriot	4	-	-	-	-																							16	16			16	16																
Mount St. Mary's	Metro	4	-	-	-	-																							16	16															•	•				
Canisius	Metro	4	-	-	-	-																														P	P	•	•		•	•								
UConn	Big East	4	-	-	-	-																																•							•	•	•			
Louisville	ACC	4	-	-	-	-																																	16	•	•	•								
Drexel	CAA	4	-	-	-	-																																							•	•	•	•		
Hofstra	CAA	3	-	-	-	-																				16						16													•					
Monmouth	CAA	3	-	-	-	-																				16					16	P					P	•												
Le Moyne	NEC	3	-	-	-	-																						16	16			P	16																	
Bryant	America East	3	-	-	-	-																																	•	•		•								
Wagner	NEC	3	-	-	-	-																																			•		•	•						
Army	Patriot	3	-	-	-	-																																									•		•	16
West Chester	D2	2	-	-	-	-																	12	12																										
UMBC	America East	2	-	-	-	-																					16	16																						
Holy Cross	Patriot	2	-	-	-	-																									16	16																		
Winthrop	Big South	2	-	-	-	-																																		•	•									
Robert Morris	MAC	2	-	-	-	-																																							•			•		
Central Michigan	MAC	2	-	-	-	-																																								•	•			
LIU	NEC	2	-	-	-	-																																										•	•	
Clemson	ACC	2	-	-	-	-																																											16	16
American	Patriot	1	-	-	-	-																						16																						
Marist	Metro	1	-	-	-	-																											P		16															
Old Dominion	American	1	-	-	-	-																																			•									
Elon	CAA	1	-	-	-	-																																				•								
Virginia Tech	ACC	1	-	-	-	-																																					16							
Saint Joseph's	Atlantic 10	1	-	-	-	-																																								•				
Vermont	America East	1	-	-	-	-																																								•				
Marquette	Big East	1	-	-	-	-																																									•			
Sacred Heart	Metro	1	-	-	-	-																											P	P	P												•			
Binghamton	America East	1	-	-	-	-																																										•		
Coastal Carolina	ASUN	1	-	-	-	-																																										•		
Niagara	Metro	1	-	-	-	-																																										•		
Akron	MAC	1	-	-	-	-																																											•	
Brown	Ivy League	1	-	-	-	-																																											•	
Liberty	ASUN	1	-	-	-	-																																											•	
Davidson	Atlantic 10	1	-	-	-	-																																												•
Stonehill	NEC	1	-	-	-	-																																												•
Manhattan	Metro	-	-	-	-	-																							P	P																				
Quinnipiac	Metro	-	-	-	-	-																														P														
Oregon	Big Ten	-	-	-	-	-																															P													

== All-time record ==
- Note: As of end of 2023 championship
- school indicates schools belong to Division II and school indicates a school belongs to Division III.

Team	App	C	F	3	4	GP	W	L	Pct	GF	GA	GD	Notes
Albany	5	0	0	0	0	7	2	5	.286	57	79	-22	
American	1	0	0	0	0	1	0	1	.000	3	19	-16	
Army	1	0	0	0	0	1	0	1	.000	8	12	-4	
Boston College	11	1	5	0	0	33	23	10	.697	475	370	105	
Boston University	8	0	0	0	0	10	2	8	.200	86	107	-21	
Bryant	3	0	0	0	0	3	0	3	.000	18	59	-41	
Canisius	4	0	0	0	0	4	0	4	.000	37	59	-22	
Central Michigan	2	0	0	0	0	2	0	2	.000	13	35	-22	
Colgate	4	0	0	0	0	4	0	4	.000	23	66	-43	
Connecticut	4	0	0	0	0	4	0	4	.000	38	60	-22	
Cornell	5	0	0	1	0	9	4	5	.444	94	90	4	
Colorado	3	0	0	0	0	5	2	3	.400	64	78	-14	
Dartmouth	15	0	1	3	0	26	11	15	.423	226	256	-30	
Delaware	3	1	0	1	0	9	7	2	.778	83	69	14	Wins championship in its first appearance
Denver	7	0	0	1	0	17	10	7	.588	164	187	-23	
Drexel	3	0	0	0	0	3	0	3	.000	23	43	-20	
Duke	21	0	0	7	0	48	27	21	.563	543	495	48	
Elon	1	0	0	0	0	1	0	1	.000	9	11	-2	
Fairfield	7	0	0	0	0	7	0	7	.000	54	103	-49	
Florida	12	0	0	1	0	25	13	12	.520	323	265	58	
Georgetown	16	0	2	1	0	31	15	16	.484	324	322	2	
Harvard	9	1	2	2	0	15	7	8	.467	123	116	7	
High Point	6	0	0	0	0	7	1	6	.143	59	124	-65	
Hofstra	3	0	0	0	0	3	0	3	.000	22	43	-21	
Holy Cross	2	0	0	0	0	2	0	2	.000	9	37	-28	
Jacksonville	9	0	0	0	0	12	3	9	.250	142	160	-18	
James Madison	19	1	0	1	0	34	16	18	.471	346	368	-22	
Johns Hopkins	11	0	0	0	0	14	3	11	.214	138	182	-44	
Lafayette	4	0	0	0	0	4	0	4	.000	29	50	-21	
Lehigh	1	0	0	0	0	2	1	1	.500	17	22	-5	
Le Moyne	3	0	0	0	0	3	0	3	.000	12	67	-55	
Louisville	4	0	0	0	0	5	1	4	.200	37	58	-21	
Loyola (MD)	24	0	1	6	0	48	24	24	.500	520	465	55	
Marist	1	0	0	0	0	1	0	1	.000	5	20	-15	
Marquette	1	0	0	0	0	1	0	1	.000	8	18	-10	
Maryland	38	14	8	6	0	100	76	24	.760	1279	822	457	Seven consecutive champion, two consecutive champion
Massachusetts	14	1	0	0	2	24	9	15	.375	195	281	-86	
Mercer	5	0	0	0	0	5	0	5	.000	39	98	-59	
Michigan	3	0	0	0	0	6	3	3	.500	67	58	9	
Monmouth	3	0	0	0	0	3	0	3	.000	17	53	-36	
Mount St. Mary's	4	0	0	0	0	4	0	4	.000	23	71	-48	
Navy	7	0	0	1	0	14	7	7	.500	178	179	-1	
New Hampshire	7	1	0	2	0	10	4	6	.400	73	84	-11	
North Carolina	24	3	2	8	0	63	42	21	.667	774	621	153	
Northwestern	24	8	1	5	0	70	54	16	.771	917	658	259	Five consecutive champion, two consecutive champion
Notre Dame	16	0	0	1	0	28	12	16	.429	317	317	0	
Ohio State	4	0	0	0	0	5	1	4	.200	46	63	-17	
Old Dominion	1	0	0	0	0	1	0	1	.000	5	16	-11	
Penn	16	0	1	2	0	31	15	16	.484	283	309	-26	
Penn State	25	2	2	7	0	46	23	23	.500	457	457	0	
Princeton	28	3	4	4	0	64	39	25	.609	689	586	103	Two consecutive champion
Richmond	6	0	0	0	0	7	1	6	.143	73	106	-33	
Robert Morris	1	0	0	0	0	1	0	1	.000	0	16	-16	
Rutgers	3	0	0	0	0	5	2	3	.400	54	65	-11	
Sacred Heart	1	0	0	0	0	1	0	1	.000	5	16	-11	
Saint Joseph's	1	0	0	0	0	1	0	1	.000	10	17	-7	
Stanford	11	0	0	0	0	13	2	11	.154	112	173	-61	
Stony Brook	10	0	0	0	0	22	12	10	.545	238	199	39	
Syracuse	20	0	3	6	0	46	26	20	.565	560	505	55	
Temple	18	2	2	5	0	30	14	16	.467	276	320	-44	
Towson	11	0	0	0	0	13	2	11	.154	137	177	-40	
Trenton State	1	0	1	0	0	1	0	1	.000	6	9	-3	
UMBC	2	0	0	0	0	2	0	2	.000	9	40	-31	
USC	6	0	0	0	0	10	4	6	.400	117	123	-6	
Vanderbilt	7	0	0	1	0	9	2	7	.222	83	114	-31	
Vermont	1	0	0	0	0	1	0	1	.000	3	16	-13	
Virginia	35	3	6	5	0	71	39	32	.549	770	736	34	
Virginia Tech	1	0	0	0	0	2	1	1	.500	21	27	-6	
Wagner	3	0	0	0	0	5	2	3	.400	48	74	-26	
West Chester	2	0	0	0	0	2	0	2	.000	14	41	-27	
William & Mary	7	0	0	0	0	7	0	7	.000	41	75	-34	
Winthrop	2	0	0	0	0	2	0	2	.000	12	34	-22	
Yale	3	0	0	0	0	4	1	3	.250	28	37	-9	

== See also ==
- NCAA Division I Women's Lacrosse Championship bids by school
- AIAW Intercollegiate Women's Lacrosse Champions
- NCAA Division II Women's Lacrosse Championship (from 2001)
- NCAA Division III Women's Lacrosse Championship (from 1985)
- List of NCAA Division I Women's lacrosse programs
- NCAA Division I Men's Lacrosse Championship
