= 1990 NCAA Division I women's lacrosse tournament =

- Dates: May 1990
- Teams: 6
- Finals site: Palmer Stadium; Princeton, NJ
- Champions: Harvard (1st title)
- Runner-up: Maryland (4th title game)
- Attendance: 2,367 finals

The 1990 NCAA Division I Women's Lacrosse Championship was the ninth annual single-elimination tournament to determine the national championship for Division I National Collegiate Athletic Association (NCAA) women's college lacrosse. The championship game was played at Palmer Stadium in Princeton, New Jersey during May 1990.

The Harvard Crimson won their first championship by defeating the Maryland Terrapins in the final, 8–7.

The leading scorer for the tournament, with 10 goals, was Mary Ann Oelgoetz, from Maryland. The Most Outstanding Player trophy was not awarded this year.

== Qualification ==
All NCAA Division I women's lacrosse programs were eligible for this championship. A total of 6 teams were invited to participate in this single-elimination tournament.

| Team | Appearance | Previous | Record |
|---|---|---|---|
| Harvard | 5th | 1989 | 13-0 |
| Loyola(MD) | 3rd | 1984 | 14-4 |
| Maryland | 6th | 1987 | 15-1 |
| Penn State | 8th | 1989 | 13-4 |
| Temple | 8th | 1989 | 11-3 |
| Virginia | 4th | 1989 | 12-3 |

== Tournament bracket ==
First Round
Temple | 9
Penn State | 4
Loyola (MD) | 13
Virginia | 7

Semifinals
Harvard | 13
Temple | 7
Maryland | 10
Loyola (MD) | 5

Finals; Palmer Stadium; Princeton, NJ
Harvard | 8
Maryland | 7

== Tournament outstanding players ==
- Julia French, Harvard
- Charlotte Joslin, Harvard
- Maggie Vaughan, Harvard
- Mary Konder, Maryland
- Mary Ann Oelgoetz, Maryland
- Jenny Ulehla, Maryland

== See also ==
- NCAA Division I Women's Lacrosse Championship
- NCAA Division III Women's Lacrosse Championship
- 1990 NCAA Division I Men's Lacrosse Championship
