= 1989 NCAA Division I women's lacrosse tournament =

- Dates: May 1989
- Teams: 6
- Finals site: John A. Farrell Stadium; West Chester, PA
- Champions: Penn State (2nd title)
- Runner-up: Harvard (1st title game)
- Attendance: 2,661 finals

The 1989 NCAA Division I Women's Lacrosse Championship was the eighth annual single-elimination tournament to determine the national championship for Division I National Collegiate Athletic Association (NCAA) women's college lacrosse. The championship game was played at John A. Farrell Stadium in West Chester, Pennsylvania during May 1989.

The Penn State Nittany Lions won their second championship by defeating the Harvard Crimson in the final, 7–8. This was Penn State's fourth consecutive appearance in the tournament final (2 wins, 2 losses).

The leading scorer for the tournament, with 6 goals, was Karen Everling, from Harvard. The Most Outstanding Player trophy was not awarded this year.

== Teams ==
All NCAA Division I women's lacrosse programs were eligible for this championship. Ultimately, 6 teams were invited to participate in this single-elimination tournament.

Team	Appearance	Previous	Record
Harvard	4th	1988	13-0
Lafayette	2nd	1988	16-2
Penn State	7th	1988	17-1
Princeton	2nd	1983	13-2
Temple	7th	1988	13-2
Virginia	3rd	1987	12-4

== Tournament bracket ==
First Round
Temple	11
Lafayette	5
Princeton	6
Virginia	5

Semifinals
Penn State	9
Temple	3
Harvard	7
Princeton	5

Finals; John A. Farrell Stadium; West Chester, PA
Penn State	7
Harvard	6

== Tournament outstanding players ==
- Lisi Bailliere, Harvard
- Katie McAnaney, Harvard
- Cheri McMonagle, Penn State
- Diane Whipple, Penn State
- Tami Worley, Penn State
- Demer Holleran, Princeton

== See also ==
- NCAA Division I Women's Lacrosse Championship
- NCAA Division III Women's Lacrosse Championship
- 1989 NCAA Division I Men's Lacrosse Championship
