= Carol Schultz Greenberg =

American lacrosse player

Personal information
- Nationality: USA

Sport
- NCAA team: Bridgeport Purple Knights (1980-1981); Temple Owls (1981-1984)

Carol Schultz Greenberg is an American former college lacrosse player. Greenberg is best known for her time at Temple University, playing for the Temple Owls women's lacrosse team.

== Early life ==
Greenberg is a native of Philadelphia and attended Abington Friends School from 1977 to 1979.

== College career ==
Greenberg began her college career at the University of Bridgeport before transferring to Temple University.

She was a First Team All-America selection in 1983 and 1984 at Temple, leading the Owls to the 1984 NCAA Women's Lacrosse Championship. She was also on the 1982 AIAW championship and 1983 NCAA national runner-up teams at Temple. In the 1984 national semifinals she set the NCAA tournament goal scoring record at the time with 7 goals in a win over Delaware.

== Halls of fame ==
Greenberg was inducted into the Temple Athletics Hall of Fame in 2008 and into the Philadelphia Jewish Sports Hall of Fame in 2007.
