= 1995 NCAA Division I women's lacrosse tournament =

- Dates: May 1995
- Teams: 6
- Finals site: Lions Stadium; Trenton, NJ
- Champions: Maryland (3rd title)
- Runner-up: Princeton (3rd title game)
- Attendance: 9,247 finals

The 1995 NCAA Division I Women's Lacrosse Championship was the 14th annual single-elimination tournament to determine the national champion of Division I NCAA women's college lacrosse. The championship game was played at Lions Stadium in Trenton, New Jersey during May 1995. All NCAA Division I women's lacrosse programs were eligible for this championship; a total of 6 teams were invited to participate.

Maryland defeated Princeton, 13–5, to win their third national championship. This would subsequently be the first of Maryland's record seven straight national titles (1995–2001). Furthermore, Maryland's championship secured an undefeated season (17–0) for the team.

The leading scorer for the tournament, with 10 goals, was Cristi Samaras from Princeton. The Most Outstanding Player trophy was not awarded this year.

== Teams ==
School	Record
Dartmouth	12-2
James Madison	12-5
Maryland	15-0
Penn State	11-5
Princeton	12-2
Temple	11-3

== Tournament bracket ==
First Round
Penn State	11
James Madison	7
Princeton	14
Temple	8

Semifinals
Maryland	12
Penn State	7
Dartmouth	8
Princeton	13

Finals; Lions Stadium; Trenton, NJ
Maryland	13
Princeton	5

== Tournament outstanding players ==
- Sarah Devens, Dartmouth
- Lauren Holleran, Dartmouth
- Kelly Amonte, Maryland
- Jamie Brodsky, Maryland
- Liz Downing, Maryland
- Randall Goldsborough, Maryland
- Laura Harmon, Maryland
- Cathy Nelson, Maryland
- Tami Riley, Maryland
- Jill Pearsall, Penn State
- Amory Rowe, Princeton
- Cristi Samaras, Princeton

== See also ==
- NCAA Division I Women's Lacrosse Championship
- NCAA Division III Women's Lacrosse Championship
- 1995 NCAA Division I Men's Lacrosse Championship
