= Kelly Amonte Hiller =

American lacrosse player and coach

Current position
- Title: Head coach
- Team: Northwestern
- Conference: Big Ten
- Record: 403–97 (.806)

Playing career
- 1992–1996: Maryland
- Position: Attack

Coaching career (HC unless noted)
- 1997–1998: Brown (assistant)
- 1999: UMass (assistant)
- 2000: Boston (assistant)
- 2002–Present: Northwestern

Head coaching record
- Overall: 403–97 (.806)

Accomplishments and honors

Championships
- 2x NCAA Champion (player) – (1995, 1996); 9x NCAA Champion (coach) (2005, 2006, 2007, 2008, 2009, 2011, 2012, 2023, 2026); 8x American Lacrosse Conference Champion (2004, 2005, 2006, 2007, 2008, 2009, 2010, 2013); 5x Big Ten Champion (2021, 2023, 2024, 2025, 2026)

Awards
- 2× NCAA National Player of the Year (1995, 1996)

Kelly Amonte Hiller is an American lacrosse coach and former player who is the women's lacrosse head-coach at Northwestern University. She has coached the Northwestern Wildcats to nine NCAA Women's Lacrosse Championships. Amonte Hiller played for the University of Maryland Terrapins, and won two national championships as a player. She was named the ACC Female Athlete of the Year in 1996. In 2012, Amonte Hiller was inducted into the National Lacrosse Hall of Fame.

Amonte Hiller is the sister of former National Hockey League player Tony Amonte. She attended high school at Thayer Academy.

== Head coaching record ==
Record table
Season	Team	Overall	Conference	Standing	Postseason
NCAA Division I (American Lacrosse Conference) (2002–2014)
2002	Northwestern	5–10	2–4		
2003	Northwestern	8–8	2–4		
2004	Northwestern	15–3	5–1	T–1st	NCAA Quarterfinal
2005	Northwestern	21–0	6–0	1st	NCAA Champions
2006	Northwestern	20–1	5–0	1st	NCAA Champions
2007	Northwestern	21–1	4–0	1st	NCAA Champions
2008	Northwestern	21–1	4–0	1st	NCAA Champions
2009	Northwestern	23–0	6–0	1st	NCAA Champions
2010	Northwestern	20–2	5–0	1st	NCAA Runner–Up
2011	Northwestern	21–2	3–2	T–2nd	NCAA Champions
2012	Northwestern	21–2	4–1	2nd	NCAA Champions
2013	Northwestern	19–3	4–1	T–1st	NCAA Final Four
2014	Northwestern	14–7	3–3	T–3rd	NCAA Final Four
NCAA Division I (Big Ten Conference) (2015–Present)
2015	Northwestern	14–7	3–2	3rd	NCAA Quarterfinal
2016	Northwestern	11–10	3–2	T–2nd	NCAA Second Round
2017	Northwestern	11–10	4–2	3rd	NCAA Second Round
2018	Northwestern	15–6	5–1	2nd	NCAA Quarterfinal
2019	Northwestern	16–5	5–1	2nd	NCAA Final Four
2020	Northwestern	4–3	0–0	†	†
2021	Northwestern	15–1	11–0	1st	NCAA Final Four
2022	Northwestern	16–5	5–1	2nd	NCAA Final Four
2023	Northwestern	21–1	6–0	1st	NCAA Champions
2024	Northwestern	18–3	5–1	1st	NCAA Runner–Up
2025	Northwestern	19–3	8–0	1st	NCAA Runner–Up
2026	Northwestern	15–3	7–1	1st	NCAA Champions
Northwestern:		403–97 (.806)	125–28 (.817)		
Total:		403–97 (.806)			
National champion Postseason invitational champion Conference regular season champion Conference regular season and conference tournament champion Division regular season champion Division regular season and conference tournament champion Conference tournament champion
