= Taylor Thornton =

American lacrosse player

- Height: 5 ft 9 in (1.75 m)
- Position: Midfield
- NCAA team: Northwestern Wildcats (2010–2013)

Taylor Alexis Thornton is an American lacrosse player who competed for the Northwestern Wildcats. She won the Honda Sports Award in June 2012 and was nominated for the Sports Illustrated College Athlete of the Year Award in 2013.

== Early life ==
A native of Dallas, Texas, Thornton is the daughter of Steve and Janice Thornton. Her brother, Blakely, played college football at Penn. Thornton attended the Hockaday School in Dallas. She starred on the lacrosse team and was a two-time All-American, two-time Texas Player of the Year, and three-time all-state selection, in addition to leading Hockaday to its first two state titles in 2008 and 2009. In addition, Thornton was a four-year letterwinner in field hockey, leading the team in scoring all four years. She also played varsity basketball as a freshman, leading the team in assists as the starting point guard.

Recruited by Kelly Amonte Hiller, head coach of the Northwestern Wildcats women's lacrosse team, Thornton committed to Northwestern in October of her senior year of high school.

== College career ==
Thornton made her debut at Northwestern in 2010 starting all 22 games for the Wildcats. In her freshman year, she was named IWLCA third-team All-American, earned second team All America honors for WomensLacrosse.com and was named to the All-Rookie Team. She led the Wildcats with 29 caused turnovers and was second on the team with 38 ground balls. During her sophomore season, in 2011, Taylor established herself as a top player and premier one-on-one defender for the Wildcat team. She was named First-team IWLCA All-American and IWLCA Division I Defender of the Year. She notched 14 goals, 1 assist, 38 ground balls, and 15 caused turnovers. In 2012 she was named as a Tewaaraton award finalist. Thornton was named the winner of Lacrosse Honda Sports Award as the national player of the year. In 2013 Thornton was co-captain. She started all 85 games of her career. With 24 goals, 2 assists, 38 ground balls and 24 caused turnovers heading into playoffs.

In 2018, Thornton was inducted into the Northwestern Athletics Hall of Fame.

In 2023, Thorton became the first female inductee into the Western Lacrosse Hall of Fame.
