= 2023 NCAA Division I women's lacrosse tournament =

College lacrosse tournament

- Dates: May 12–28, 2023
- Teams: 29
- Finals site: WakeMed Soccer Park, Cary, NC
- Champions: Northwestern (8th title)
- Runner-up: Boston College (6th title game)
- Semifinalists: Denver (1st Final Four); Syracuse (9th Final Four)
- Winning coach: Kelly Amonte Hiller (8th title)
- MOP: Izzy Scane, Northwestern
- Attendance: 6,705 finals

The 2023 NCAA Division I Women's Lacrosse Championship was the 41st annual single-elimination tournament to determine the national champion of Division I NCAA women's college lacrosse. The semifinal and championship rounds were played at WakeMed Soccer Park in Cary, NC from May 26–28, 2023. All other rounds were played at campus sites, usually at the home field of the higher-seeded team, from May 12–18. The Northwestern Wildcats won their eighth championship, beating Boston College 18–6 in the final.

== Tournament field ==
All NCAA Division I women's lacrosse programs were eligible for this championship, and a total of 29 teams were invited to participate. 15 teams qualified automatically by winning their conference tournaments, while the remaining 14 teams qualified at-large based on their regular season records.

=== Teams ===
Seed	School	Conference	Berth Type	RPI	Record
1	Northwestern	Big Ten	Automatic	1	17–1
2	Syracuse	ACC	At-large	2	16–2
3	Boston College	ACC	Automatic	3	16–3
4	North Carolina	ACC	At-large	4	14–4
5	Denver	Big East	Automatic	5	19–0
6	Florida	American	Automatic	7	16–3
7	James Madison	American	At-large	6	17–2
8	Loyola (MD)	Patriot	Automatic	8	17–2
	Albany	America East	Automatic	20	12–6
	Army	Patriot	At-large	16	15–3
	Central Michigan	MAC	Automatic	81	10–8
	Drexel	CAA	At-large	23	12–5
	Fairfield	MAAC	Automatic	21	14–4
	Jacksonville	ASUN	Automatic	25	12–7
	Johns Hopkins	Big Ten	At-large	18	8–8
	Maryland	Big Ten	At-large	9	14–6
	Marquette	Big East	At-large	19	15–3
	Mercer	Big South	Automatic	26	17–2
	Michigan	Big Ten	At-large	14	11–7
	Notre Dame	ACC	At-large	11	13–5
	Penn	Ivy	Automatic	15	13–4
	Penn State	Big Ten	At-large	32	11–6
	Richmond	Atlantic Ten	Automatic	22	16–3
	Sacred Heart	NEC	Automatic	71	11–7
	Stony Brook	CAA	Automatic	10	14–3
	UConn	Big East	At-large	12	12–6
	UMass	Atlantic 10	At-large	17	16–2
	USC	Pac-12	Automatic	24	16–3
	Virginia	ACC	At-large	13	11–6

== Bracket ==
=== Tournament bracket ===
First Round; May 12; Regional Campus Sites
Michigan	13
Central Michigan	6
Stony Brook	12
Penn State	8
Fairfield	6
8	Loyola (MD)*	11
5	Denver*	10
USC	7
Virginia	14
Albany (NY)	16
Richmond	18
Marquette	8
Sacred Heart	5
4	North Carolina*	16
Penn	13
UConn	8
Mercer	6
Notre Dame	21
Jacksonville	7
6	Florida*	13
7	James Madison*	12
Army	8
Maryland	11
Drexel	6
Johns Hopkins	19
UMass	8

Second Round; May 14; Regional Campus Sites
1	Northwestern*	8
Michigan	7
Stony Brook	8
8	Loyola (MD)	9
5	Denver	8
Albany (NY)	6
Richmond	12
4	North Carolina	16
3	Boston College*	9
Penn	7
Notre Dame	16
6	Florida	15
7	James Madison	15
Maryland	14
Johns Hopkins	8
2	Syracuse*	25

Quarterfinals; May 18; Campus Sites
1	Northwestern	16
8	Loyola (MD)	6
5	Denver	5
4	North Carolina	4
3	Boston College	20
Notre Dame	6
7	James Madison	7
2	Syracuse	13

Semifinals; May 26; WakeMed Soccer Park
1	Northwestern	15
5	Denver	7
3	Boston College	8
2	Syracuse	7

Final; May 28; WakeMed Soccer Park
1	Northwestern	18
3	Boston College	6

- *First and second round host

== Record by conference ==
Conference	# of Bids	Record	Win %	R1	R16	QF	SF	CG	NC
Big Ten	5	6–4	.600	4	4	1	1	1	1
ACC	5	9–5	.643	3	4	4	2	1	–
Big East	3	3–3	.500	3	1	1	1	–	–
American	2	3–2	.600	2	2	1	–	–	–
Patriot	2	2–2	.500	2	1	1	–	–	–
America East	1	1–1	.500	1	1	–	–	–	–
Ivy League	1	1–1	.500	1	1	–	–	–	–
A-10	2	1–2	.333	2	1	–	–	–	–
CAA	2	1–2	.333	2	1	–	–	–	–
ASUN	1	0–1	.000	1	–	–	–	–	–
Big South	1	0–1	.000	1	–	–	–	–	–
MAAC	1	0–1	.000	1	–	–	–	–	–
MAC	1	0–1	.000	1	–	–	–	–	–
NEC	1	0–1	.000	1	–	–	–	–	–
Pac-12	1	0–1	.000	1	–	–	–	–	–

== See also ==
- NCAA Division II Women's Lacrosse Championship
- NCAA Division III Women's Lacrosse Championship
- NCAA Division I Men's Lacrosse Championship
