= 1988 NCAA Division I women's lacrosse tournament =

- Dates: May 1988
- Teams: 6
- Finals site: Walton Field, Haverford, PA
- Champions: Temple (2nd title)
- Runner-up: Penn State (3rd title game)
- Attendance: 2,570 finals

The 1988 NCAA Division I Women's Lacrosse Championship was the seventh annual single-elimination tournament to determine the national championship for Division I National Collegiate Athletic Association (NCAA) women's college lacrosse. The championship game was played at Walton Field in Haverford, Pennsylvania, on May 21, 1988.

The Temple Owls won their second championship by defeating the Penn State Nittany Lions in the final, 15–7. This was a rematch of the previous year's final, won by Penn State. Furthermore, Temple's win secured an undefeated season (19–0) for the Owls.

The leading scorers for the tournament, all with 8 goals, were Gail Cummings (Temple), Denise Bourassa (Temple), Mandee Moore (Temple), and Tami Worley (Penn State). The Most Outstanding Player trophy was not awarded this year.

== Qualification ==
All NCAA Division I women's lacrosse programs were eligible for this championship. In the end, 6 teams contested this tournament, an increase of two from the previous year.

Team	Appearance	Previous	Record
Harvard	3rd	1984	11–2
Lafayette	1st	Never	17–1
Northwestern	5th	1987	9–4
Penn State	6th	1987	13–3
Temple	6th	1987	15–0
William & Mary	2nd	1983	11–1

== Tournament bracket ==
First Round
Harvard	7
William & Mary	6
Penn State	12
Northwestern	6

Semifinals
Temple	13
Harvard	8
Lafayette	6
Penn State	8

Finals; Walton Field; Haverford, PA
Temple	15
Penn State	7

== Tournament outstanding players ==
- Gail Cummings, Temple
- Mandee Moore, Temple
- Vicki Yocum, Penn State

== See also ==
- NCAA Division I Women's Lacrosse Championship
- NCAA Division III Women's Lacrosse Championship
- 1988 NCAA Division I Men's Lacrosse Championship
