= 1986 NCAA Division I women's lacrosse tournament =

- Dates: May 1986
- Teams: 6
- Finals site: Byrd Stadium; College Park, MD
- Champions: Maryland (1st title)
- Runner-up: Penn State (1st title game)
- Attendance: 1,555 finals

The 1986 NCAA Division I Women's Lacrosse Championship was the fifth annual single-elimination tournament to determine the national championship for Division I National Collegiate Athletic Association (NCAA) women's college lacrosse. The championship game was played at Byrd Stadium in College Park, Maryland during May 1986.

The Maryland Terrapins won their first championship after defeating the Penn State Nittany Lions in the final, 11–10.

For the second consecutive year, the leading scorer for the tournament was Anysia Fedec, from Maryland, with 13 goals. The Most Outstanding Player trophy was not awarded this year.

== Qualification ==
All NCAA Division I women's lacrosse programs were eligible for this championship. In the end, 6 teams contested this tournament, an increase of two from the previous year.

| Team | Appearance | Previous | Record |
|---|---|---|---|
| Maryland | 4th | 1985 | 12-4 |
| New Hampshire | 3rd | 1985 | 11-3 |
| Northwestern | 3rd | 1984 | 10-3 |
| Penn State | 4th | 1985 | 15-1 |
| Temple | 4th | 1985 | 14-2 |
| Virginia | 1st | Never | 14-1 |

== Tournament bracket ==
First Round
Temple | 8
New Hampshire | 5
Maryland | 11
Northwestern | 7

Semifinals
Penn State | 8
Temple | 7
Virginia | 7
Maryland | 12

Finals; Byrd Stadium; College Park, MD
Penn State | 10
Maryland | 11

== Tournament outstanding players ==
- Anysia Fedec, Maryland
- Trudy Stumpf, Maryland
- Maggy Dunphy, Penn State

== See also ==
- NCAA Division I Women's Lacrosse Championship
- NCAA Division III Women's Lacrosse Championship
- 1986 NCAA Division I Men's Lacrosse Championship
