= Howarth Field =

Lacrosse and field hockey stadium

- Interactive map of Howarth Field
- Address: Philadelphia, Pennsylvania; United States
- Coordinates: 39.9720°N 75.1577°W
- Owner: Temple
- Operator: Temple Athletics
- Capacity: 500
- Type: Stadium
- Current use: Lacrosse and Field Hockey

Construction
- Opened: 2016

Tenants
- Temple Owls (NCAA); Temple Field Hockey and Women's Lacrosse

Website
- owlsports.com/facilities/howarth-field/103

Howarth Field is a lacrosse and field hockey stadium in Philadelphia, Pennsylvania. The field is the home of Temple Owls field hockey and Temple Owls women's lacrosse.

== Name ==
The field is named in honor of former student-athlete and field hockey player Cherifa Howarth and her husband Greg, who made a $500,000 gift to the university for the construction of the field.

== Opening ==
The grand opening of the field was held on September 2, 2016, when the Temple field hockey team faced Penn State.
