= 1985 NCAA Division I women's lacrosse tournament =

1985 women's lacrosse championship

- Dates: May 1985
- Teams: 4
- Finals site: Franklin Field; Philadelphia, PA
- Champions: New Hampshire (1st title)
- Runner-up: Maryland (2nd title game)
- Attendance: 1,157 finals

The 1985 NCAA Division I Women's Lacrosse Championship was the fourth annual single-elimination tournament to determine the national championship of Division I NCAA women's college lacrosse. The championship game was played at Franklin Field in Philadelphia, Pennsylvania during May 1985.

The New Hampshire Wildcats won their first championship by defeating the Maryland Terrapins in the final, 6–5.

The leading scorer for the tournament was Anysia Fedec, from Maryland, with 8 goals. The Most Outstanding Player trophy would not be awarded again until 1998.

== Qualification ==
With the addition of the NCAA Division III Women's Lacrosse Championship this year, only NCAA Division I women's lacrosse programs were eligible for this championship. In turn, only 4 teams contested this tournament, a decrease from the 12 teams who participated each of the previous two years.

Team	Appearance	Last Bid	Record
Maryland	3rd	1984	14-1
New Hampshire	2nd	1984	9-3
Penn State	3rd	1984	14-3
Temple	3rd	1984	17-0

== Tournament bracket ==
Semifinals
New Hampshire	7
Temple	3
Maryland (3OT)	12
Penn State	11

Finals; Franklin Field; Philadelphia, PA
New Hampshire	6
Maryland	5

== Tournament outstanding players ==
- Karen Trudel, Maryland
- Trudy Stumpf, Maryland
- Sandy Vander-Heyden, New Hampshire

== See also ==
- NCAA Division I Women's Lacrosse Championship
- NCAA Division III Women's Lacrosse Championship
- 1985 NCAA Division I Men's Lacrosse Championship
