= 1982 NCAA women's lacrosse tournament =

American lacrosse tournament

1982 NCAA Division I women's lacrosse tournament
- Dates: May 1982
- Teams: 2
- Finals site: Lions Stadium; Trenton, NJ
- Champions: Massachusetts (1st title)
- Runner-up: Trenton State (1st title game)

The 1982 NCAA Women's Lacrosse Championship was the first annual single-elimination tournament to determine the national championship of NCAA women's college lacrosse. Unlike later editions, this title was determined by a single game. The championship game was played at Lions Stadium in Trenton, New Jersey during May 1982.

The Massachusetts Minutewomen won their first championship by defeating the host Trenton State Lions in the final, 9–6.

The leading scorer in the match was Repy Hattersly, from Trenton State, with 4 goals. There was no All-Tournament Team or Most Outstanding Player named this year.

== Qualification ==
Until 1985, there was only one NCAA championship; a Division III title was added in 1985 and a Division II title in 2001. Hence, all NCAA women's lacrosse programs were eligible for this championship. Nonetheless, only 2 teams were invited to participate.

Team	Appearance	Last Bid
Massachusetts	1st	Never
Trenton State	1st	Never

== Tournament bracket ==
Championship; May 1982
Massachusetts	9
Trenton State	6

== See also ==
- 1982 NCAA Division I men's lacrosse tournament
