= 1997 NCAA Division II lacrosse tournament =

1997 NCAA Division II Lacrosse Championship
Tournament information
- Sport: College lacrosse
- Location: (New York (state)) Garden City, New York
- Host(s): Adelphi University
- Venue(s): Stiles Field
- Participants: 2

Final positions
- Champions: NYIT (1st title)
- Runner-up: Adelphi (8th title game)

Tournament statistics
- Matches played: 1
- Goals scored: 29 (29 per match)
- Attendance: 838 (838 per match)
- MVP: Joe Brock, NYIT
- Top scorer(s): Steve Tempone, NYIT (6)

The 1997 NCAA Division II Lacrosse Championship was the 13th annual tournament to determine the national champions of NCAA Division II men's college lacrosse in the United States.

The final, and only match of the tournament, was played at Stiles Field at Adelphi University in Garden City, New York.

NYIT defeated hosts Adelphi in the championship game, 18–11, to claim the Bears' first Division II national title.

== Bracket ==
Championship
Adelphi	11
NYIT	18

== See also ==
- 1997 NCAA Division I Men's Lacrosse Championship
- 1997 NCAA Division I Women's Lacrosse Championship
