= 1991 NCAA Division I women's lacrosse tournament =

- Dates: May 1991
- Teams: 6
- Finals site: Lions Stadium, Trenton, NJ
- Champions: Virginia (1st title)
- Runner-up: Maryland (5th title game)
- Attendance: 2,338 finals

The 1991 NCAA Division I Women's Lacrosse Championship was the 10th annual single-elimination tournament to determine the national championship of Division I NCAA women's college lacrosse. The championship game was played at Lions Stadium in Trenton, New Jersey during May 1991. All NCAA Division I women's lacrosse programs were eligible for this championship. A total of 6 teams were invited to participate.

The Virginia Cavaliers won their first championship by defeating the Maryland Terrapins in the final, 8–6.

The leading scorer for the tournament, with 10 goals, was Jenny Slingluff from Virginia. The Most Outstanding Player trophy was not awarded this year.

== Teams ==
School	Record
Harvard	10-2
Lafayette	16-1
Maryland	13-2
New Hampshire	10-1
Penn State	13-3
Virginia	15-1

== Tournament bracket ==
First Round
Penn State	11
Lafayette	9
New Hampshire	11
Harvard	10

Semifinals
Virginia	10
Penn State	5
Maryland (OT)	4
New Hampshire	3

Finals; Lions Stadium; Trenton, NJ
Virginia	8
Maryland	6

== Tournament outstanding players ==
- Mandy Stevenson, Maryland
- Michele Uhlfelder, Maryland
- Kierstin Coppola, New Hampshire
- Karen Hoysted, Penn State
- Robyn Nye, Virginia
- Jenny Slingluff, Virginia

== See also ==
- NCAA Division I Women's Lacrosse Championship
- NCAA Division III Women's Lacrosse Championship
- 1991 NCAA Division I Men's Lacrosse Championship
