= 2015 NCAA Division I women's lacrosse tournament =

- Dates: May 8–24, 2015
- Teams: 26
- Finals site: PPL Park, Chester, PA
- Champions: Maryland (12th title)
- Runner-up: North Carolina (3rd title game)
- MOP: Taylor Cummings, Maryland

The 2015 NCAA Division I Women's Lacrosse Championship was the 34th annual single-elimination tournament to determine the national champion of Division I NCAA women's college lacrosse. For the first time, the semifinal and championship rounds were played at PPL Park (the home of the Philadelphia Union of the MLS) in Chester, Pennsylvania from May 22–24, 2015.

Maryland defeated North Carolina in the final, 9–8, to win their twelfth national title.

== Tournament field ==
All NCAA Division I women's lacrosse programs were eligible for this championship, and a total of 26 teams were invited to participate. 13 teams qualified automatically by winning their conference tournaments while the remaining 13 teams qualified at-large based on their regular season records.

=== Teams ===
| Seed | School | Conference | Berth Type | RPI | Record |
|---|---|---|---|---|---|
| 1 | Maryland | Big Ten | At-large | 1 | 17–1 |
| 2 | North Carolina | ACC | At-large | 2 | 15–3 |
| 3 | Duke | ACC | At-large | 5 | 14–4 |
| 4 | Syracuse | ACC | Automatic | 3 | 14–7 |
| 5 | Boston College | ACC | At-large | 6 | 15–3 |
| 6 | Stony Brook | America East | Automatic | 4 | 18–1 |
| 7 | Virginia | ACC | At-large | 7 | 11–6 |
| 8 | Northwestern | Big Ten | At-large | 9 | 12–6 |
| | Albany | America East | At-large | 19 | 14–4 |
| | Bryant | NEC | Automatic | 49 | 14–4 |
| | Fairfield | MAAC | Automatic | 30 | 14–4 |
| | Florida | Big East | Automatic | 15 | 14–5 |
| | Jacksonville | Atlantic Sun | Automatic | 17 | 17–2 |
| | James Madison | CAA | Automatic | 11 | 15–4 |
| | Johns Hopkins | Independent | At-large | 14 | 14–3 |
| | Louisville | ACC | At-large | 24 | 10–7 |
| | Loyola (MD) | Patriot | Automatic | 12 | 15–4 |
| | Massachusetts | Atlantic 10 | Automatic | 18 | 18–1 |
| | Notre Dame | ACC | At-large | 20 | 10–8 |
| | Ohio State | Big Ten | At-large | 21 | 13–7 |
| | Penn | Ivy | At-large | 16 | 13–4 |
| | Penn State | Big Ten | Automatic | 8 | 14–4 |
| | Princeton | Ivy | Automatic | 10 | 14–3 |
| | Stanford | MPSF | Automatic | 13 | 15–2 |
| | USC | MPSF | At-large | 22 | 13–5 |
| | Winthrop | Big South | Automatic | 42 | 17–3 |

== Bracket ==
First Round; May 8 Regional Campus Sites
Massachusetts | 13
Jacksonville | 8
Notre Dame | 13
Ohio State | 11
8 | Northwestern | 10
Louisville | 7
Loyola (MD) | 21
Bryant | 3
Penn | 11
Albany (NY) | 10
James Madison | 10
USC | 13
Princeton | 18
Fairfield | 8
7 | Virginia | 18
Winthrop | 6
Penn State | 14
Johns Hopkins | 11
Stanford | 10
Florida | 15

Second Round; May 10; Regional Campus Sites
1 | Maryland | 19
Massachusetts | 8
Notre Dame | 11
8 | Northwestern | 16
5 | Boston College | 12
Loyola (MD) | 19
Penn | 10
4 | Syracuse | 13
3 | Duke | 17
USC | 9
Princeton | 8
6 | Stony Brook | 4
7 | Virginia | 11
Penn State | 13
Florida | 6
2 | North Carolina | 11

Quarterfinals; May 16–17; Campus Sites
1 | Maryland | 17
8 | Northwestern | 5
Loyola (MD) | 7
4 | Syracuse | 10
3 | Duke | 7
Princeton | 3
Penn State | 8
2 | North Carolina | 11

Semifinals; May 22; PPL Park
1 | Maryland | 10
4 | Syracuse | 8
3 | Duke | 7
2 | North Carolina | 16

Final; May 24; PPL Park
1 | Maryland | 9
2 | North Carolina | 8

== See also ==
- NCAA Division II Women's Lacrosse Championship
- NCAA Division III Women's Lacrosse Championship
- 2015 NCAA Division I Men's Lacrosse Championship
