= 1992 NCAA Division I women's lacrosse tournament =

- Dates: May 1992
- Teams: 6
- Finals site: Goodman Stadium, Bethlehem, PA
- Champions: Maryland (2nd title)
- Runner-up: Harvard (3rd title game)
- Attendance: 1,799 finals

The 1992 NCAA Division I Women's Lacrosse Championship was the 11th annual single-elimination tournament to determine the national championship of Division I NCAA women's college lacrosse. The championship game was played at Goodman Stadium in Bethlehem, Pennsylvania during May 1992. All NCAA Division I women's lacrosse programs were eligible for this championship; a total of 6 teams were invited to participate.

Maryland defeated Harvard, 11–10 (in overtime), to win their second national championship.

The leading scorers for the tournament, both with 7 goals, were Liz Berkery (Harvard) and Betsy Elder (Maryland). The Most Outstanding Player trophy was not awarded this year.

== Teams ==
School	Record
Harvard	13-1
Maryland	12-1
Penn State	11-4
Princeton	12-3
Temple	11-4
Virginia	13-2

== Tournament bracket ==
First Round
Princeton	11
Temple	6
Virginia	11
Penn State	5

Semifinals
Harvard	10
Princeton	5
Maryland (OT)	8
Virginia	7

Finals; Goodman Stadium; Bethlehem, PA
Harvard	10
Maryland (OT)	11

== Tournament outstanding players ==
- Liz Berkery, Harvard
- Ceci Clark, Harvard
- Sarah Winters, Harvard
- Betsy Elder, Maryland
- Kerstin Manning, Maryland
- Mandy Stevenson, Maryland

== See also ==
- NCAA Division I Women's Lacrosse Championship
- NCAA Division III Women's Lacrosse Championship
- 1992 NCAA Division I Men's Lacrosse Championship
