= 1997 NCAA Division I women's lacrosse tournament =

- Dates: May 1997
- Teams: 8
- Finals site: Goodman Stadium; Bethlehem, PA
- Champions: Maryland (5th title)
- Runner-up: Loyola (MD) (1st title game)
- Attendance: 3,571 finals

The 1997 NCAA Division I Women's Lacrosse Championship was the 16th annual single-elimination tournament to determine the national champion of Division I NCAA women's college lacrosse. The championship game was played at Goodman Stadium in Bethlehem, Pennsylvania during May 1997. All NCAA Division I women's lacrosse programs were eligible for this championship. This year, the tournament field expanded from 6 to 8 teams, the first expansion since 1986.

Maryland defeated Loyola Maryland, 8–7, to win their fifth and third consecutive, national championship. This would subsequently become the third of Maryland's record seven straight national titles (1995–2001).

The leading scorers for the tournament, each with 10 goals, were Amy Fine from North Carolina and Kerri Johnson from Loyola (MD). The Most Outstanding Player trophy was not awarded this year, although it would be reintroduced in 1998.

== Teams ==
| School | Conference | Berth | Record |
|---|---|---|---|
| James Madison | CAA | Automatic | 13-4 |
| Loyola (MD) | CAA | At-large | 13-2 |
| Maryland | ACC | Automatic | 18-1 |
| North Carolina | ACC | At-large | 13-3 |
| Penn State | Independent | At-large | 10-5 |
| Temple | Independent | At-large | 13-2 |
| Virginia | ACC | At-large | 14-4 |
| William & Mary | CAA | At-large | 10-5 |

== Tournament bracket ==
First Round
Maryland | 6
Penn State | 2
Temple | 17
James Madison | 10
North Carolina (3OT) | 12
Virginia | 11
Loyola (MD) | 11
William & Mary | 2

Semifinals
Maryland | 9
Temple | 6
North Carolina | 8
Loyola (MD) | 10

Finals; Goodman Stadium; Bethlehem, PA
Maryland | 8
Loyola (MD) | 7

== Tournament outstanding players ==
- Kerri Johnson, Loyola (MD)
- Michelle Meyer, Loyola (MD)
- Stephanie Roberts, Loyola (MD)
- Allison Valentino, Loyola (MD)
- Ginette Chelious, Maryland
- Caryl Duckworth, Maryland
- Sarah Forbes, Maryland
- Alex Kahoe, Maryland
- Ryan Laubach, Maryland
- Cathy Nelson, Maryland
- Sascha Newmarch, Maryland
- Sarah Dacey, North Carolina
- Melissa Michaels, Temple

== See also ==
- 1997 NCAA Division I Men's Lacrosse Championship
- 1997 NCAA Division II Lacrosse Championship
- 1997 NCAA Division III Women's Lacrosse Championship
