= Penn Quakers women's lacrosse =

- Founded: 1974
- University: University of Pennsylvania
- Head coach: Karin Corbett (since 1999 season)
- Stadium: Franklin Field (capacity: 52,958)
- Location: Philadelphia, Pennsylvania
- Conference: Ivy League
- Nickname: Quakers
- Colors: Red and blue

NCAA Tournament Runner-Up
- 2008

NCAA Tournament Final Fours
- 2007, 2008, 2009

NCAA Tournament appearances
- (18) - 1983, 1984, 2007, 2008, 2009, 2010, 2011, 2012, 2013, 2014, 2015, 2016, 2017, 2018, 2019, 2023, 2024, 2025

Conference Tournament championships
- 2010, 2013, 2014, 2023

Conference regular season championships
- 1980, 1982, 2007, 2008, 2009, 2010, 2011, 2012, 2013, 2014, 2016, 2017, 2018, 2023

The Penn Quakers women's lacrosse team is an NCAA Division I college lacrosse team representing the University of Pennsylvania as part of the Ivy League. They play their home games at Franklin Field in Philadelphia, Pennsylvania.

== Individual career records ==
Record	Number	Player	Years
Goals	148	Ali DeLuca	2007-10
Assists	127	Nina Corcoran	2013-16
Points	237	Sherry Marcantonio	1980-83
Saves	620	Leslie Campbell	1980-82

== Individual single-season records ==
Record	Number	Player	Years
Goals	58	Julie Heller; Tory Bensen	1981; 2015
Assists	58	Nina Corcoran	2016
Points	85	Nina Corcoran	2016
Saves	204	Wendy DiDomenico	1987

== Seasons ==
Statistics overview
Season	Coach	Overall	Conference	Standing	Postseason
USWLA (1974–1979)
1974	?	3-3-1			
1975		4-4-1			
1976		5-4-2			
1977		8-3-1			
1978		8-4-1			
1979		9-3			
AIAW (Ivy League) (1980–1982)
1980	Anne Sage	9-2-2	4-0-2	T-1st	AIAW Fourth-Place
1981		10-3	5-1	2nd	
1982		11-4-1	5-1	T-1st	AIAW Third Place
NCAA Division I (Ivy League) (1983–present)
1983		9-5	4-2	T-2nd	NCAA Quarterfinal
1984		7-7	4-2	3rd	NCAA First Round
1985		5-9	4-2	T-2nd	
1986		3-10	3-3	T-3rd	
1987		5-8	2-4	5th	
1988		6-5	4-2	T-2nd	
1989		6-7	3-3	T-3rd	
1990		3-9	1-5	T-6th	
1991		2-10	1-5	T-6th	
1992		3-10	0-6	7th	
1993		6-9	2-4	T-5th	
1994		8-6	3-3	4th	
1995		5-7	1-5	T-6th	
1996		5-7	3-3	T-3rd	
1997		5-7	2-4	5th	
1998		4-9	2-5	T-6th	
1999	Karin Brower	1-12	1-6	7th	
2000		6-8	1-6	7th	
2001		8-8	3-4	5th	
2002		7-8	3-4	5th	
2003		6-10	2-5	6th	
2004		9-7	4-3	4th	
2005		8-7	4-3	T-3rd	
2006		10-6	4-3	4th	
2007		16-2	7-0	1st	NCAA Semifinal
2008		17-2	7-0	1st	NCAA Runner-up
2009		15-3	7-0	1st	NCAA Semifinal
2010		15-4	7-0	1st	NCAA Quarterfinal
2011		11-6	6-1	T-1st	NCAA First Round
2012		9-8	6-1	1st	NCAA First Round
2013		11-6	7-0	1st	NCAA First Round
2014		13-5	6-1	T-1st	NCAA Second Round
2015		14-5	6-1	2nd	NCAA Second Round
2016		15-5	6-1	T-1st	NCAA Quarterfinal
2017		13-4	6-1	T-1st	NCAA First Round
2018		14-5	6-1	T-1st	NCAA Second Round
2023	Karin Corbett	11-4	7-0	1st	
Total:		379-281-10 (.574)			
National champion Postseason invitational champion Conference regular season champion Conference regular season and conference tournament champion Division regular season champion Division regular season and conference tournament champion Conference tournament champion

== Postseason Results ==
The Quakers have appeared in 16 NCAA tournaments. Their postseason record is 15-16.

Year	Seed	Round	Opponent	Score
1983	--	First Round; Quarterfinal	Loyola (MD); Penn State	W, 9-5; L, 2-12
1984	--	First Round	Delaware	L, 1-18
2007	#4	First Round; Quarterfinal; Semifinal	Boston U. #5 Maryland #1 Northwestern	W, 11-5; W, 9-7; L, 2-12
2008	#2	First Round; Quarterfinal; Semifinal; Final	Colgate #7 Boston U. Duke #1 Northwestern	W, 16-7; W, 8-5; W, 9-8; L, 6-10
2009	#4	First Round; Quarterfinal; Semifinal	Fairfield #5 Duke #1 Northwestern	W, 10-8; W, 10-9 (2ot); L, 12-13 (2ot)
2010	#8	First Round; Quarterfinal	Boston U. #1 Maryland	W, 14-9; L, 10-15
2011	--	First Round	#5 Duke	L, 9-12
2012	--	First Round	#6 Loyola (MD)	L, 9-10 (ot)
2013	--	First Round	Virginia	L, 6-12
2014	--	First Round; Second Round	Canisius #1 Maryland	W, 9-4; L, 5-13
2015	--	First Round; Second Round	Albany #4 Syracuse	W, 11-10 (ot); L, 10-13
2016	#7	First Round; Second Round; Quarterfinal	Wagner; Towson; Penn State	W, 17-7; W, 12-4; L, 4-8
2017	#7	First Round	Navy	L, 10-11
2018	--	First Round; Second Round	Penn State; Stony Brook	W, 15-14 (2ot); L, 5-18
2019	--	First Round	Georgetown	L, 12-13 (ot)
2023	--	First Round; Second Round	UConn; Boston College	W, 13-8; L, 7-9
