= Penn State Nittany Lions women's lacrosse =

Women's varsity lacrosse team of Penn State University

- Founded: 1965; 61 years ago
- University: Pennsylvania State University
- Head coach: Missy Doherty (since 2011 season)
- Stadium: Panzer Stadium (capacity: 1,300)
- Location: State College, Pennsylvania
- Conference: Big Ten Conference
- Nickname: Nittany Lions
- Colors: Blue and white

NCAA Tournament championships
- 1987, 1989

NCAA Tournament Runner-Up
- 1986, 1988

NCAA Tournament Final Fours
- 1983, 1985, 1986, 1987, 1988, 1989, 1991, 1995, 1999, 2016, 2017

NCAA Tournament appearances
- 1983, 1984, 1985, 1986, 1987, 1988, 1989, 1990, 1991, 1992, 1993, 1995, 1996, 1997, 1999, 2001, 2005, 2012, 2013, 2014, 2015, 2016, 2017, 2018, 2023, 2024, 2026

Conference Tournament championships
- 2015

Conference regular season championships
- 2013

The Penn State Nittany Lions women's lacrosse team is an NCAA Division I college lacrosse team representing Pennsylvania State University as part of the Big Ten Conference. They play their home games at Panzer Stadium in State College, Pennsylvania.

== Coach ==
The Nittany Lions have been coached by Missy Doherty since 2011. Doherty was a 1997 graduate of the University of Maryland, where she won 3 national titles and amassed a 68–2 record playing lacrosse there. She spent time as an assistant coach at Vanderbilt, Brown, and Princeton from 1998 to 2003, playing an important part of Princeton's back-to-back national titles in 2002 and 2003. In 2004 she became head coach at Towson, and the next year led the Tigers to their first NCAA tournament appearance in school history, which resulted in a one-goal loss to #5 Georgetown in the first round. Doherty's Tigers made three more appearances in 2008, 2009, and 2010 before she moved to State College in 2011 to coach the Nittany Lions. While at Towson she amassed a 79–46 record.

After a rebuilding 2011 season, Doherty led Penn State to the NCAA Tournament for the first time in seven years in 2012, and the quarterfinal for the first time in thirteen years as well. Penn State has made seven straight NCAA Tournament appearances under her watch from 2012 to 2018, including five quarterfinals and back-to-back Final Fours in 2016 and 2017.

== Historical statistics ==
Overall
Years of Lacrosse	62
1st Season	1965
Head coaches	10
All-Time Record	603–323–5
Big Ten games
Big Ten season W-L record (Since 2015)	34–31
Big Ten Titles	0
Big Ten Tournament Titles	1
NCAA Tournament
NCAA Appearances	27
NCAA W-L record	23–25
Final Fours	11
Championship Games	4
NCAA National Championships	2

*Statistics through 2026 season

== Individual career records ==
Record	Number	Player	Years
Goals	271	Marsha Florio	1982–85
Assists	137	Maggie McCormick	2012–15
Points	380	Marsha Florio	1982–85
Draw Controls	278	Jenna Mosketti	2013–16
Saves	735	Lee Tortorelli	2002–05
Save %	.725	Jody Field	1976–79
GAA	3.51	Jody Field	1976–79

== Individual single-season records ==
Record	Number	Player	Year
Goals	79	Marsha Florio	1985
Assists	51	Megan Smith	1990
Points	109	Marsha Florio	1985
Saves	219	Lee Tortorelli	2004
Save %	.748	Jody Field	1979
GAA	3.10	Jody Field	1977

== Seasons ==
Record table
Season	Coach	Overall	Conference	Standing	Postseason
Unaffiliated (1965–1972)
1965	Margaret Fringer	2–1			
1966	Virginia Harpster	0–1			
1967	Virginia Harpster	0–3–1			
1968	Ellen Perry	5–1			
1969	Ellen Perry	1–5			
1970	Ellen Perry	2–4			
1971	Ellen Perry	1–5			
1972	Ellen Perry	3–4–1			
USWLA (South District) (1973–1980)
1973	Ellen Perry	3–5			
1974	Gillian Rattray	7–1			
1975	Gillian Rattray	8–2			
1976	Gillian Rattray	8–1			
1977	Gillian Rattray	9–1			
1978	Gillian Rattray	14–0–1			USWLA National Champions
1979	Gillian Rattray	17–0			USWLA National Champions
1980	Gillian Rattray	14–1–2			USWLA National Champions
AIAW (1981–1982)
1981	Gillian Rattray	13–2			AIAW Fifth Place
1982	Gillian Rattray	14–3			AIAW Third Place
NCAA Division I (Independent) (1983–2001)
1983	Gillian Rattray	14–2			NCAA Semifinal
1984	Gillian Rattray	12–2			NCAA Quarterfinal
1985	Gillian Rattray	14–4			NCAA Semifinal
1986	Susan Delaney-Scheetz	16–2			NCAA Runner-up
1987	Susan Delaney-Scheetz	17–2			NCAA Champions
1988	Susan Delaney-Scheetz	15–4			NCAA Runner-up
1989	Susan Delaney-Scheetz	19–1			NCAA Champions
1990	Julie Williams	13–5			NCAA Quarterfinal
1991	Julie Williams	14–4			NCAA Semifinal
1992	Julie Williams	11–5			NCAA Quarterfinal
1993	Julie Williams	11–5			NCAA Quarterfinal
1994	Julie Williams	9–6			
1995	Julie Williams	12–6			NCAA Semifinal
1996	Julie Williams	11–5			NCAA Quarterfinal
1997	Julie Williams	10–6			NCAA Quarterfinal
1998	Julie Williams	10–8			
1999	Julie Williams	15–5			NCAA Semifinal
2000	Karen Schnellenbach	8–9			
2001	Suzanne Isidor	8–10			NCAA First Round
NCAA Division I (American Lacrosse Conference) (2002–2014)
2002	Suzanne Isidor	8–9	4–2		
2003	Suzanne Isidor	9–8	5–1		
2004	Suzanne Isidor	6–11	3–3		
2005	Suzanne Isidor	12–5	5–1	2nd	NCAA First Round
2006	Suzanne Isidor	8–8	4–1	2nd	
2007	Suzanne Isidor	9–8	0–4	5th	
2008	Suzanne Isidor	5–12	0–4	5th	
2009	Suzanne Isidor	9–8	2–2	T-2nd	
2010	Suzanne Isidor	10–7	1–4	T-4th	
2011	Missy Doherty	10–8	3–2	T-2nd	
2012	Missy Doherty	12–7	3–2	3rd	NCAA Quarterfinal
2013	Missy Doherty	14–7	4–1	T-1st	NCAA Quarterfinal
2014	Missy Doherty	10–8	3–3	T-3rd	NCAA First Round
NCAA Division I (Big Ten Conference) (2015–present)
2015	Missy Doherty	16–5	4–1	2nd	NCAA Quarterfinal
2016	Missy Doherty	14–7	3–2	T-2nd	NCAA Semifinal
2017	Missy Doherty	17–4	5–1	2nd	NCAA Semifinal
2018	Missy Doherty	10–10	3–3	3rd	NCAA First Round
2019	Missy Doherty	8–9	3–3	T-3rd	
2020	Missy Doherty	5–2	0–0		
2021	Missy Doherty	4–9	4–8	T-5th	
2022	Missy Doherty	6–9	0–6	7th	
2023	Missy Doherty	11–7	3–3	T-2nd	NCAA First Round
2024	Missy Doherty	11–8	4–2	T-2nd	NCAA First Round
2025	Missy Doherty	7–9	5–3	T-2nd	
2026	Kayla Treanor	12–7	4–4	T-4th	NCAA First Round
Total:		603–323–5 (.651)			
National champion Postseason invitational champion Conference regular season champion Conference regular season and conference tournament champion Division regular season champion Division regular season and conference tournament champion Conference tournament champion

== Postseason Results ==
The Nittany Lions have appeared in 27 NCAA tournaments. Their postseason record, including third place games, is 23–25.

Year	Seed	Round	Opponent	Score
1983	–	Quarterfinal; Semifinal; Third Place	Penn; Delaware; Massachusetts	W, 12–2; L, 5–7; W, 7–6 (ot)
1984	–	Quarterfinal	Delaware	L, 9–10
1985	–	Semifinal	Maryland	L, 11–12 (3ot)
1986	–	Semifinal; Final	Temple; Maryland	W, 8–7; L, 10–11
1987	–	Semifinal; Final	Virginia; Temple	W, 14–9; W, 7–6
1988	–	Quarterfinal; Semifinal; Final	Northwestern; Lafayette; Temple	W, 12–6; W, 8–6; L, 7–15
1989	–	Semifinal; Final	Temple; Harvard	W, 9–3; W, 7–6
1990	–	Quarterfinal	Temple	L, 4–9
1991	–	Quarterfinal; Semifinal	Lafayette; Virginia	W, 11–9; L, 5–10
1992	–	Quarterfinal	Virginia	L, 5–11
1993	–	Quarterfinal	Princeton	L, 7–11
1995	–	Quarterfinal; Semifinal	James Madison; Maryland	W, 11–7; L, 7–12
1996	–	Quarterfinal	Princeton	L, 9–13
1997	–	Quarterfinal	Maryland	L, 2–6
1999	–	First Round; Quarterfinal; Semifinal	West Chester #4 Princeton #1 Maryland	W, 23–7; W, 9–7 (ot); L, 13–17
2001	#13	First Round	#4 Dartmouth	L, 7–9
2005	#7	First Round	North Carolina	L, 6–7 (3ot)
2012	–	First Round; Quarterfinal	#8 Towson #1 Florida	W, 15–8; L, 2–15
2013	#7	First Round; Second Round; Quarterfinal	Canisius; Massachusetts #2 Northwestern	W, 14–13; W, 12–9; L, 7–15
2014	–	First Round	Princeton	L, 13–16
2015	–	First Round; Second Round; Quarterfinal	Johns Hopkins #7 Virginia #2 North Carolina	W, 14–11; W, 13–11; L, 8–11
2016	–	First Round; Second Round; Quarterfinal; Semifinal	Winthrop #2 Florida #7 Penn #3 North Carolina	W, 16–6; W, 14–13 (ot); W, 8–4; L, 11–12
2017	#4	Second Round; Quarterfinal; Semifinal	James Madison #5 Princeton #1 Maryland	W, 19–14; W, 14–12; L, 10–20
2018	–	First Round	Penn	L, 14–15 (2ot)
2023	–	First Round	Stony Brook	L, 8–12
2024	–	First Round	James Madison	L, 13–14
2026	–	First Round	Stanford	L, 5–7

== See also ==
- Lacrosse in Pennsylvania
