= 1987 NCAA Division I women's lacrosse tournament =

- Dates: May 1987
- Teams: 6
- Finals site: Byrd Stadium, College Park, MD
- Champions: Penn State (1st title)
- Runner-up: Temple (2nd title game)
- Attendance: 1,169 finals

The 1987 NCAA Division I Women's Lacrosse Championship was the sixth annual single-elimination tournament to determine the national championship for Division I National Collegiate Athletic Association (NCAA) women's college lacrosse. The championship game was played at Byrd Stadium in College Park, Maryland during May 1987.

Penn State defeated Temple, 7–6, in the final to win their fourth national championship, albeit first in the NCAA.

The leading scorers for the tournament, both with 9 goals, were Karen Geromini, from New Hampshire, and Tami Worley, from Penn State. The Most Outstanding Player trophy was not awarded this year.

== Qualification ==
All NCAA Division I women's lacrosse programs were eligible for this championship. In the end, 6 teams contested this tournament, an increase of two from the previous year.

Team	Appearance	Previous	Record
Maryland	5th	1986	13-4
New Hampshire	4th	1986	12-3
Northwestern	4th	1986	11-3
Penn State	5th	1986	15-2
Temple	5th	1986	15-0
Virginia	2nd	1986	12-2

== Tournament bracket ==
First Round
New Hampshire	11
Northwestern	9
Virginia	10
Maryland	5

Semifinals
Temple	9
New Hampshire	8
Penn State	14
Virginia	9

Finals; Byrd Stadium; College Park, MD
Temple	6
Penn State	7

== Tournament outstanding players ==
- Beth Stokes, Penn State
- Chris Vitale, Penn State
- Mandee Moore, Temple

== See also ==
- NCAA Division I Women's Lacrosse Championship
- NCAA Division III Women's Lacrosse Championship
- 1987 NCAA Division I Men's Lacrosse Championship
