= Northwestern Wildcats women's lacrosse =

American college lacrosse team

- Founded: 1982; 44 years ago; relaunched in 2002
- University: Northwestern University
- Head coach: Kelly Amonte Hiller (since 2001 season)
- Stadium: Martin Stadium (outdoor) and Ryan Fieldhouse (indoor) (capacity: 2,000)
- Location: Evanston, Illinois
- Conference: Big Ten Conference (previously ALC)
- Nickname: Wildcats
- Colors: Purple and white

NCAA Tournament championships
- 2005, 2006, 2007, 2008, 2009, 2011, 2012, 2023, 2026

NCAA Tournament Runner-Up
- 2010, 2024, 2025

NCAA Tournament Final Fours
- 2005, 2006, 2007, 2008, 2009, 2010, 2011, 2012, 2013, 2014, 2019, 2021, 2022, 2023, 2024, 2025, 2026

NCAA Tournament Quarterfinals
- 1984, 2004, 2005, 2006, 2007, 2008, 2009, 2010, 2011, 2012, 2013, 2014, 2015, 2018, 2019, 2021, 2022, 2023, 2024, 2025, 2026

NCAA Tournament appearances
- 1983, 1984, 1986, 1987, 1988, 2004, 2005, 2006, 2007, 2008, 2009, 2010, 2011, 2012, 2013, 2014, 2015, 2016, 2017, 2018, 2019, 2021, 2022, 2023, 2024, 2025, 2026

Conference Tournament championships
- 2007, 2008, 2009, 2010, 2011, 2013, 2019, 2021, 2023, 2024, 2025, 2026

Conference regular season championships
- 2004, 2005, 2006, 2007, 2008, 2009, 2010, 2013, 2021, 2023, 2024, 2025, 2026

The Northwestern Wildcats women's lacrosse team is an NCAA Division I college lacrosse team representing Northwestern University as part of the Big Ten Conference. The Wildcats are led by head coach Kelly Amonte Hiller. Northwestern plays their home games at Ryan Fieldhouse (indoors) and Martin Stadium (outdoors).

It was a member of the American Lacrosse Conference until the 2014 season, joining their current Big Ten Conference for the 2015 season. The team began competition at the varsity level in 1982, operated as a club sport from 1993 to 2001, and resumed play at the varsity level in 2002. Northwestern has won eight national championships in women's lacrosse, including five straight from 2005 to 2009 and back-to-back in 2011 and 2012. After a twelve year drought, the team won their eighth title in 2023, and most recently, a ninth title in 2026. The Midwestern team's success is a rarity in a sport that enjoys most of its popularity on the East Coast - the Wildcats are the only women's team from outside the Eastern Time Zone to win the national title.

== History ==
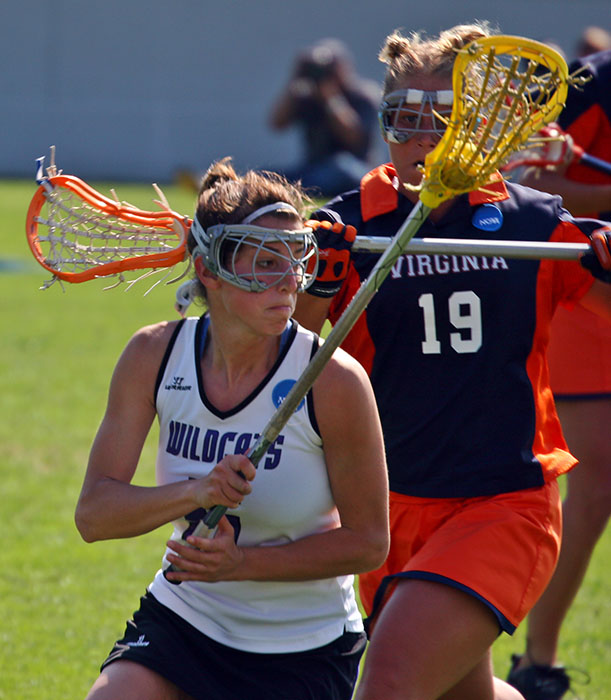
2005 NCAA Women's Lacrosse Championship between the Virginia Cavaliers and Northwestern Wildcats

The Wildcats began playing at the varsity level in 1982 and enjoyed success early, appearing in the NCAA tournament five times before budget cuts forced the team to disband in 1993 and operate as a club sport from 1993 to 2001. Northwestern hired former Maryland player Kelly Amonte Hiller to be the head coach when the university revived the team in 2002. Hiller had to think outside the box in forming her squad; she recruited two freshmen who had never played the game before after seeing them jog around campus (they went on to be named All-Americans).

Her methods proved successful, however, and the team improved its record every year from its inception until 2005, when the Wildcats went undefeated and won their first national title. Two years and two more championships later in 2007, they joined Maryland as the only teams to win three consecutive national titles. The Wildcats would take home championship trophies again in 2008 and after a second undefeated season in 2009. From 2005 to 2009 the team won five consecutive national championships. The streak ended in 2010 when the team lost to Maryland in a championship game that set the attendance record for a women's lacrosse match in the United States. During their five-year championship run, the Wildcats had a record of 106-3 and were undefeated at home.

The Wildcats started a new streak the following year in 2011 when they won their sixth championship, and then a seventh in 2012. Their streak of finals appearances would end in 2013 following a Final Four loss to the North Carolina Tar Heels.

When the team visited the White House after winning their first championship in 2005, they created a minor fashion scandal when some members wore flip-flops. The publicity inspired the team to auction off their sandals with the proceeds going to the Friends of Jaclyn charity. The team first met Jaclyn Murphy in 2005 when she was recovering from a brain tumor and their support prompted her father to start a charity that matches other college teams with pediatric brain tumor patients.

Following the Wildcats dynastic run of seven titles in eight years from 2005 to 2012, Northwestern lost in the Final Four in 2013 and 2014. They reached the Final Four in 2019, 2021, and 2022 as well.

In 2023, Northwestern won their eighth national title after defeating Boston College 18-6 in the finals.

2024 and 2025 both featured trips to the national championship game but both resulted in losses and seasons as national runner-ups. In 2024, the Wildcats lost to Boston College and in 2025 Northwestern lost to North Carolina. The Wildcats won their 9th national championship in 2026 after avenging their 2025 national championship loss to North Carolina. Prior to the start of the season, Martin Stadium was selected as the host site for the 2026 National Championship, making the Wildcats the first team since 1986 to win the tournament on home turf.

== Historical Statistics ==
Overall
Years of Lacrosse	33
1st Season	1982
Head Coaches	4
All-Time Record	431-146
ALC Games
ALC W-L record	66-17
ALC Titles	8
Big Ten Games
Big Ten W-L record	103-25
Big Ten Titles	3
NCAA tournament
NCAA Appearances	24
NCAA W-L record	54-16
Final Fours	14
National Championships	8

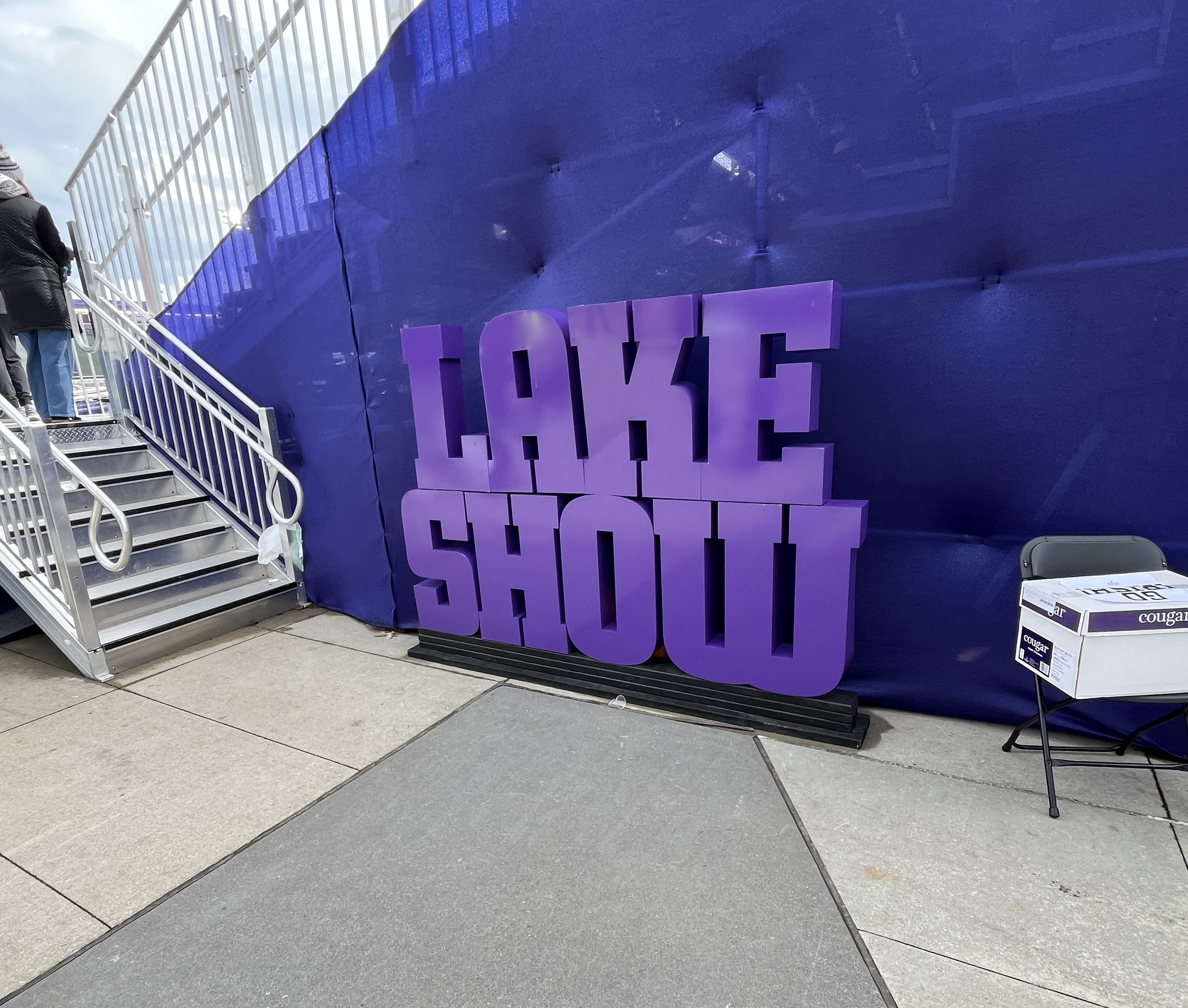

- Statistics through 2023 season

== Individual career records ==
Record	Number	Player	Years
Goals	376	Izzy Scane	2019-2024
Assists	224	Hannah Nielsen	2006-09
Points	483	Izzy Scane Madison Taylor	2019-2024 2023-2026
Ground balls	183	Christy Finch	2005-08
Draw controls	496	Shelby Fredericks	2015-18
Saves	553	Morgan Lathrop	2006-09

== Individual single-season records ==
Record	Number	Player	Year
Goals	109	Madison Taylor	2025
Assists	83	Hannah Nielsen	2009
Points	158	Madison Taylor	2025
Draw controls	185	Sam Smith	2025
Saves	191	Jenika Cuocco	2026

== Seasons ==
Record table
Season	Coach	Overall	Conference	Standing	Postseason
NCAA Division I (Independent) (1982–1992)
1982	Cindy Timchal	8–3			
1983	Cindy Timchal	11–3			NCAA First Round
1984	Cindy Timchal	10–4			NCAA Quarterfinal
1985	Cindy Timchal	7–4			
1986	Cindy Timchal	10–4			NCAA First Round
1987	Cindy Timchal	10–4			NCAA First Round
1988	Cindy Timchal	10–5			NCAA First Round
1989	Cindy Timchal	6–5			
1990	Cindy Timchal	4–8			
1991	Robin Cummings	1–10			
1992	Patti Bossio	2–8			
No team (1993–2001)
NCAA Division I (American Lacrosse Conference) (2002–2014)
2002	Kelly Amonte Hiller	5–10	2–4		
2003	Kelly Amonte Hiller	8–8	2–4		
2004	Kelly Amonte Hiller	15–3	5–1	T–1st	NCAA Quarterfinal
2005	Kelly Amonte Hiller	21–0	6–0	1st	NCAA Champions
2006	Kelly Amonte Hiller	20–1	5–0	1st	NCAA Champions
2007	Kelly Amonte Hiller	21–1	4–0	1st	NCAA Champions
2008	Kelly Amonte Hiller	21–1	4–0	1st	NCAA Champions
2009	Kelly Amonte Hiller	23–0	6–0	1st	NCAA Champions
2010	Kelly Amonte Hiller	20–2	5–0	1st	NCAA Runner–Up
2011	Kelly Amonte Hiller	21–2	3–2	T–2nd	NCAA Champions
2012	Kelly Amonte Hiller	21–2	4–1	2nd	NCAA Champions
2013	Kelly Amonte Hiller	19–3	4–1	T–1st	NCAA Final Four
2014	Kelly Amonte Hiller	14–7	3–3	T–3rd	NCAA Final Four
NCAA Division I (Big Ten Conference) (2015–Present)
2015	Kelly Amonte Hiller	14–7	3–2	3rd	NCAA Quarterfinal
2016	Kelly Amonte Hiller	11–10	3–2	T–2nd	NCAA Second Round
2017	Kelly Amonte Hiller	11–10	4–2	3rd	NCAA Second Round
2018	Kelly Amonte Hiller	15–6	5–1	2nd	NCAA Quarterfinal
2019	Kelly Amonte Hiller	16–5	5–1	2nd	NCAA Final Four
2020	Kelly Amonte Hiller	4–3	0–0	†	†
2021	Kelly Amonte Hiller	15–1	11–0	1st	NCAA Final Four
2022	Kelly Amonte Hiller	16–5	5–1	2nd	NCAA Final Four
2023	Kelly Amonte Hiller	21–1	6–0	1st	NCAA Champions
2024	Kelly Amonte Hiller	18–3	5–1	1st	NCAA Runner–Up
2025	Kelly Amonte Hiller	19–3	8–0	1st	NCAA Runner–Up
2026	Kelly Amonte Hiller	19–3	7–1	1st	NCAA Champions
Total:		487–155 (.759)			
National champion Postseason invitational champion Conference regular season champion Conference regular season and conference tournament champion Division regular season champion Division regular season and conference tournament champion Conference tournament champion

†NCAA canceled 2020 collegiate activities due to the COVID-19 virus.

== Postseason Results ==
The Wildcats have appeared in 27 NCAA tournaments. Their postseason record is 64-18.

Year	Seed	Round	Opponent	Score
1983	--	First Round	Harvard	L, 4-9
1984	--	First Round; Quarterfinal	New Hampshire #3 Temple	W, 6-2; L, 8-16
1986	--	Quarterfinal	Maryland	L, 7-11
1987	--	Quarterfinal	New Hampshire	L, 9-11
1988	--	Quarterfinal	Penn State	L, 6-12
2004	--	First Round; Quarterfinal	Notre Dame #2 Virginia	W, 10-8; L, 11-15
2005	#1	First Round; Quarterfinal; Semifinal; Final	Mount St. Mary's #8 Princeton #4 Dartmouth #6 Virginia	W, 16-3; W, 8-6; W, 8-4; W, 13-10
2006	#4	First Round; Quarterfinal; Semifinal; Final	Stanford #5 North Carolina #1 Duke #7 Dartmouth	W, 17-9; W, 17-6; W, 11-10 (ot); W, 7-4
2007	#1	First Round; Quarterfinal; Semifinal; Final	Holy Cross; Syracuse #4 Penn #3 Virginia	W, 19-7; W, 14-9; W, 12-2; W, 15-13
2008	#1	First Round; Quarterfinal; Semifinal; Final	Notre Dame #8 Princeton #5 Syracuse #2 Penn	W, 15-7; W, 18-11; W, 16-8; W, 10-6
2009	#1	First Round; Quarterfinal; Semifinal; Final	Massachusetts #8 Princeton #4 Penn #3 North Carolina	W, 23-6; W, 16-9; W, 13-12 (2OT); W, 21-7
2010	#2	First Round; Quarterfinal; Semifinal; Final	Notre Dame #7 Duke #3 North Carolina #1 Maryland	W, 19-7; W, 18-8; W, 15-10; L, 11-13
2011	#2	First Round; Quarterfinal; Semifinal; Final	Boston College #7 Albany #3 North Carolina #1 Maryland	W, 11-8; W, 18-4; W, 11-10; W, 8-7
2012	#2	First Round; Quarterfinal; Semifinal; Final	Notre Dame #7 Duke #3 Maryland #4 Syracuse	W, 12-7; W, 12-7; W, 9-7; W, 8-6
2013	#2	Second Round; Quarterfinal; Semifinal	Stanford #7 Penn State #3 North Carolina	W, 15-8; W, 15-7; L, 4-11
2014	#5	Second Round; Quarterfinal; Semifinal	Louisville #4 Florida #1 Maryland	W, 11-8; W, 12-11 (OT); L, 6-9
2015	#8	First Round; Second Round; Quarterfinal	Louisville; Notre Dame #1 Maryland	W, 10-7; W, 16-11; L, 5-17
2016	--	First Round; Second Round	Louisville #6 Notre Dame	W, 15-5; L, 3-15
2017	--	First Round; Second Round	Albany #8 Stony Brook	W, 15-7; L, 9-13
2018	--	First Round; Second Round; Quarterfinal	Richmond #7 Towson #2 North Carolina	W, 24-18; W, 21-17; L, 14-19
2019	#4	Second Round; Quarterfinal; Semifinal	Notre Dame #5 Syracuse #1 Maryland	W, 13-10; W, 18-14; L, 13-25
2021	#2	Second Round; Quarterfinal; Semifinal	Denver #7 Duke #3 Syracuse	W, 19-4; W, 22-10; L, 13-21
2022	#4	First Round; Second Round; Quarterfinal; Semifinal	Central Michigan; Michigan #5 Syracuse #1 North Carolina	W, 22-7; W, 15-12; W, 15-4; L, 14-15
2023	#1	Second Round; Quarterfinal; Semifinal; Final	Michigan #8 Loyola (MD) #5 Denver #3 Boston College	W, 8-7; W, 16-6; W, 15-7; W, 18-6
2024	#1	Second Round; Quarterfinal; Semifinal; Final	Denver #8 Penn; Florida #2 Boston College	W, 17-4; W, 20-7; W, 15-11; L, 13-14
2025	#3	Second Round; Quarterfinal; Semifinal; Final	Michigan; Penn #2 Boston College #1 North Carolina	W, 15-7; W, 17-12; W, 12-11; L, 8-12
2026	#1	Second Round; Quarterfinal; Semifinal; Final	James Madison #8 Colorado #4 Johns Hopkins #2 North Carolina	W, 17-5; W, 13-12 (2OT); W, 16-11; W, 14-11

== Awards and records ==
- Tewaaraton Trophy

Kristen Kjellman – 2006, 2007
Hannah Nielsen – 2008, 2009
Shannon Smith – 2011
Izzy Scane – 2023, 2024
Madison Taylor – 2026

- Honda Sports Award – Lacrosse

Kristen Kjellman – 2005, 2006, 2007
Hannah Nielsen – 2008, 2009
Shannon Smith – 2011
Taylor Thornton – 2012
Izzy Scane – 2023, 2024

- Big Ten – Suzy Favor Athlete of the Year

Hannah Nielsen – 2008
Shannon Smith – 2011

- Intercollegiate Women's Lacrosse Coaches Association Division I National Coach of the Year

Kelly Amonte Hiller – 2005, 2008, 2009, 2011, 2012, 2023

- Big Ten Tournament MVP – Lacrosse

Mallory Weisse – 2019
Izzy Scane – 2021, 2023, 2024
Jane Hansen – 2025
Jenika Cuocco – 2026
