= Temple Owls women's lacrosse =

- Founded: 1975
- University: Temple University
- Head coach: Bonnie Rosen (since 2007 season)
- Stadium: Howarth Field (capacity: 500)
- Location: Philadelphia, Pennsylvania
- Conference: American Conference
- Nickname: Owls
- Colors: Cherry and white

Pre-NCAA era championships
- 1982

NCAA Tournament championships
- 1984, 1988

NCAA Tournament Runner-Up
- 1983, 1987

NCAA Tournament Final Fours
- 1983, 1984, 1985, 1986, 1987, 1988, 1989, 1990, 1997

NCAA Tournament appearances
- 1983, 1984, 1985, 1986, 1987, 1988, 1989, 1990, 1992, 1995, 1997, 1998, 2001, 2002, 2003, 2004, 2008, 2021

Conference Tournament championships
- 2001, 2002, 2003, 2004, 2008

Conference regular season championships
- 1999, 2000, 2001, 2002, 2003, 2004, 2005, 2008

The Temple Owls women's lacrosse is an NCAA Division I college lacrosse team representing Temple University as a member of the American Conference. The team plays home games at Howarth Field in Philadelphia.

== Historical statistics ==
Overall
Years of Lacrosse	44
1st Season	1975
Head Coaches	4
All-Time Record	464-255-4
Atlantic 10 games
Atlantic 10 season W-L record (1999-2013)	74-26
Atlantic 10 Titles	8
Atlantic 10 Tournament Titles	5
Big East games
Big East season W-L record (2014-2018)	51-35
Big East Titles	0
Big East Tournament Titles	0
American Athletic games
American Athletic season W-L record (2019-)	24-21
American Athletic Titles	0
American Athletic Tournament Titles	0
NCAA Tournament
NCAA Appearances	17
NCAA W-L record	13-15
Final Fours	9
Championship Games	4
NCAA National Championships	2

*Statistics through 2018 season

== Individual career records ==
Record	Number	Player	Years
Goals	289	Gail Cummings	1985-88
Assists	89	Gail Cummings	1985-88
Points	378	Gail Cummings	1985-88
Ground balls	175	Amy Stein	1996-00
Draw controls	343	Belle Mastropietro	2019- 2024
Caused turnovers	98	Shelly Wosczyna	1999-02
Saves	754	Jill Marple	1988-91
Save %	.656	Jill Marple	1988-91
GAA	4.87	Chrissy Muller	1984-87

== Individual single-season records ==
Record	Number	Player	Years
Goals	94	Gail Cummings	1988
Assists	37	Noelle Cebron	2002
Points	126	Gail Cummings	1988
Ground balls	68	Shelly Wosczyna	2002
Draw controls	105	Belle Mastropietro	2022
Caused turnovers	43	Shelly Wosczyna	2002
Saves	273	Debbie Kelly	1982
Save %	.796	Debbie Kelly	1982
GAA	3.68	Debbie Kelly	1982

== Seasons ==
Record table
Season	Coach	Overall	Conference	Standing	Postseason
AIAW (1975–1982)
1975	Tina Sloan Green	1-4			
1976		4-3			
1977		6-3			
1978		6-3			
1979		11-6			
1980		12-5			
1981		12-7			
1982		16-2-1			AIAW champions
NCAA Division I (Independent) (1983–1998)
1983		12-2-3			NCAA Runner-up
1984		16-2			NCAA Champions
1985		17-1			NCAA Semifinal
1986		15-3			NCAA Semifinal
1987		16-1			NCAA Semifinal
1988		19-0			NCAA Champions
1989		14-3			NCAA Semifinal
1990		12-4			NCAA Semifinal
1991		5-8			
1992		11-5			NCAA Quarterfinal
1993	Kim Ciarrocca	9-6			
1994		6-9			
1995		11-4			NCAA Quarterfinal
1996		11-5			
1997		14-3			NCAA Semifinal
1998		14-5			NCAA Quarterfinal
NCAA Division I (Atlantic 10 Conference) (1999–2013)
1999		8-11	5-0	1st	
2000		9-9	5-1	T-1st	
2001		13-6	5-0	1st	NCAA First Round
2002		14-5	7-0	1st	NCAA First Round
2003		13-6	7-0	1st	NCAA First Round
2004		11-8	6-1	T-1st	NCAA First Round
2005	Jenny Ulehla	10-7	6-1	T-1st	
2006		10-8	5-2	T-2nd	
2007	Bonnie Rosen	6-11	4-3	4th	
2008		13-7	6-1	T-1st	NCAA First Round
2009		4-12	2-5	6th	
2010		7-10	4-3	4th	
2011		7-10	5-2	3rd	
2012		9-8	3-4	T-5th	
2013		9-8	4-3	T-3rd	
NCAA Division I (Big East Conference) (2014–present)
2014		6-10	4-3	T-4th	
2015		10-6	2-5	6th	
2016		13-6	4-3	T-3rd	
2017		13-5	6-3	4th	
2018		9-8	4-5	T-5th	
Total:		464-255-4 (.645)			
National champion Postseason invitational champion Conference regular season champion Conference regular season and conference tournament champion Division regular season champion Division regular season and conference tournament champion Conference tournament champion

== Postseason Results ==
The Owls have appeared in 19 NCAA tournaments. Their postseason record is 15-17.

Year	Seed	Round	Opponent	Score
1983	--	Quarterfinal; Semifinal; Final	Princeton; Massachusetts; Delaware	W, 16-6; W, 10-4; L, 7-10
1984	--	Quarterfinal; Semifinal; Final	Northwestern; Delaware; Maryland	W, 16-8; W, 13-3; W, 6-4
1985	--	Semifinal	New Hampshire	L, 3-7
1986	--	Quarterfinal; Semifinal	New Hampshire; Penn State	W, 8-5; L, 7-8
1987	--	Semifinal; Final	New Hampshire; Penn State	W, 9-8; L, 6-7
1988	--	Semifinal; Final	Harvard; Penn State	W, 13-8; W, 15-7
1989	--	Quarterfinal; Semifinal	Lafayette; Penn State	W, 11-5; L, 3-9
1990	--	Quarterfinal; Semifinal	Penn State; Harvard	W, 9-4; L, 7-13
1992	--	Quarterfinal	Princeton	L, 6-11
1995	--	Quarterfinal	Princeton	L, 8-14
1997	--	Quarterfinal; Semifinal	James Madison; Maryland	W, 17-10; L, 6-9
1998	--	First Round; Quarterfinal	Duke #2 North Carolina	W, 17-11; L, 9-10
2001	#15	First Round	#2 Duke	L, 3-17
2002	--	First Round	Virginia	L, 8-20
2003	--	First Round	#2 Maryland	L, 6-26
2004	--	First Round	#3 Maryland	L, 4-22
2008	--	First Round	#3 Maryland	L, 7-20
2021	--	First Round; Second Round	UMass #4 Boston College	W, 14-13; L, 11-21
