= 1984 NCAA women's lacrosse tournament =

1984 NCAA Division I women's lacrosse tournament
- Dates: May 1984
- Teams: 12
- Finals site: Nickerson Field, Boston, MA
- Champions: Temple (1st title)
- Runner-up: Maryland (1st title game)
- MOP: Marie Schmucker, Temple
- Attendance: 1,938 finals

The 1984 NCAA Women's Lacrosse Championship was the third annual single-elimination tournament to determine the national championship of NCAA women's college lacrosse. The championship game was played at Nickerson Field in Boston, Massachusetts during May 1984.

The Temple Owls won their first championship after defeating the Maryland Terrapins in the final, 6–4.

The leading scorer for the tournament, for the second straight year, was Karen Emas, from Delaware, with 20 goals. Marie Schmucker, from Temple, was named the Most Outstanding Player of the tournament.

== Qualification ==
Until 1985, there was only one NCAA championship; a Division III title was added in 1985 and a Division II title in 2001. Hence, all NCAA women's lacrosse programs were eligible for this championship. This tournament, in turn, was contested by 12 teams.

Team	Appearance	Last Bid	Record
Delaware	2nd	1983	12-3-1
Harvard	2nd	1983	12-1
Lehigh	1st	Never	12-4
Loyola (MD)	2nd	1983	14-3
Maryland	2nd	1983	14-0-1
Massachusetts	3rd	1983	7-5
New Hampshire	1st	Never	11-2
Northwestern	2nd	1983	8-3
Penn	2nd	1983	7-6
Penn State	2nd	1983	12-1
Temple	2nd	1983	12-2
Yale	1st	Never	8-5

== Tournament bracket ==
First round
Lehigh (2OT)	11
Loyola (MD)	10
Massachusetts (OT)	6
Yale	5
Northwestern	6
New Hampshire	2
Delaware	18
Penn	1

Quarterfinals
1	Maryland	12
Lehigh	6
4	Harvard	4
Massachusetts	5
3	Temple	16
Northwestern	7
2	Penn State	9
Delaware	10

Semifinals
1	Maryland	9
Massachusetts	3
3	Temple	13
Delaware	3

Finals; Nickerson Field; Boston, MA
1	Maryland	4
3	Temple	6
Third place
Massachusetts	5
Delaware	9

== Tournament outstanding players ==
- Karen Emas, Delaware
- Missy Meharg, Delaware
- Linda Schmidt, Delaware
- Celine Flynn, Maryland
- Andrea Lemire, Maryland
- Mary Lynne Morgan, Maryland
- Kay Ruffino, Maryland
- Tracy Stumpf, Maryland
- Carol Progulski, Massachusetts
- Barbara Bielicki, Temple
- Marie Schmucker, Temple (Most Outstanding Player)
- Carol Schultz, Temple

== See also ==
- NCAA Division I Women's Lacrosse Championship
- 1984 NCAA Division I Men's Lacrosse Championship
