= 1983 NCAA women's lacrosse tournament =

1983 NCAA Division I women's lacrosse tournament
- Dates: May 1983
- Teams: 12
- Finals site: Franklin Field; Philadelphia, PA
- Champions: Delaware (1st title)
- Runner-up: Temple (1st title game)
- MOP: Karen Emas, Delaware
- Attendance: 2,880 finals

The 1983 NCAA Women's Lacrosse Championship was the second annual single-elimination tournament to determine the national championship of NCAA women's college lacrosse. The championship game was played at Franklin Field in Philadelphia, Pennsylvania during May 1983.

The Delaware Blue Hens won their first championship by defeating the Temple Owls in the final, 10–7.

The leading scorer for the tournament was Karen Emas, from Delaware, with 14 goals. Emas was also named the Most Outstanding Player of the tournament.

== Qualification ==
Until 1985, there was only one NCAA championship; a Division III title was added in 1985 and a Division II title in 2001. Hence, all NCAA women's lacrosse programs were eligible for this championship. A total of 12 teams were invited to contest the tournament, expanding on the 2 teams from the previous year. Eleven teams made their debuts in the NCAA tournament this year.

Team	Appearance	Last Bid	Record
Dartmouth	1st	Never	8-5
Delaware	1st	Never	14-2
Harvard	1st	Never	11-3-1
Loyola (MD)	1st	Never	7-3-1
Maryland	1st	Never	11-2-1
Massachusetts	2nd	1982	11-1-1
Northwestern	1st	Never	8-2
Penn	1st	Never	8-4
Penn State	1st	Never	12-1
Princeton	1st	Never	7-6
Temple	1st	Never	11-1-3
William & Mary	1st	Never	8-5

== Tournament bracket ==
First round
Princeton	12
Dartmouth	10
Harvard	9
Northwestern	4
Delaware	11
William & Mary	7
Penn	9
Loyola (MD)	5

Quarterfinals
1	Temple	16
Princeton	6
4	Massachusetts	7
Harvard	6
3	Maryland	8
Delaware	11
2	Penn State	12
Penn	2

Semifinals
1	Temple	10
4	Massachusetts	4
Delaware	7
2	Penn State	5

Finals; Franklin Field; Philadelphia, PA
1	Temple	7
Delaware	10
Third place
4	Massachusetts	6
2	Penn State (OT)	7

== Tournament outstanding players ==
- Anne Brooking, Delaware
- Karen Emas, Delaware (Most Outstanding Player)
- Missy Meharg, Delaware
- Linda Schmidt, Delaware
- Rita Hubneri, Massachusetts
- Pam Moryl, Massachusetts
- Carol Progulske, Massachusetts
- Marsha Florio, Penn State
- Barb Jordan, Penn State
- Jane Koffenberger, Penn State
- Kathleen Barrett Geiger, Temple
- Marie Schmucker, Temple

== See also ==
- NCAA Division I Women's Lacrosse Championship
- 1983 NCAA Division I Men's Lacrosse Championship
