= Lions Stadium =

Soccer stadium in Brisbane, Australia

Luxury Paints Stadium
- Lions Stadium
- Interactive map of Luxury Paints Stadium
- Location: Richlands; Queensland, 4077; Australia
- Coordinates: 27°35′33″S 152°57′00″E
- Capacity: 5,000
- Surface: Grass
- Record attendance: 2,535 (Brisbane Roar Women vs Western Sydney Wanderers Women, 28 November 2019

Tenants
- Brisbane Lions/Queensland Lions (1980–2004); Lions FC (2013–present); Brisbane Roar Women (2018–2021); Brisbane Roar Academy

Lions Stadium (also known as Luxury Paints Stadium for sponsorship reasons) is a soccer stadium located in Brisbane, Queensland, Australia. It has lights for night matches and can seat up to 5000 people.

It serves as the primary ground for the Queensland Lions in the National Premier League.

It also hosts the Brisbane Roar Women and the Brisbane Roar Academy teams.
