= NCAA Division II women's lacrosse tournament =

American collegiate lacrosse tournament

- Association: NCAA
- Sport: Women's college lacrosse
- Founded: 2001; 25 years ago
- Division: Division II
- No. of teams: 16
- Country: United States
- Most recent champion: Florida Southern (2nd)
- Most titles: Adelphi (9)
- Broadcaster: ESPNU
- Website: NCAA.com

The NCAA Division II women's lacrosse tournament is an annual single-elimination tournament hosted by the National Collegiate Athletic Association to determine the national team champion of women's collegiate lacrosse among its Division II members in the United States. It has been held annually since 2001, except for 2020.

Adelphi have been the most successful team, with nine national titles.

Florida Southern are the reigning national champions, winning their second title in 2026.

== Results ==
NCAA Division II women's lacrosse tournament
Year	Site (Host Team)	Championship Results		
Year	Site (Host Team)	Champion	Score	Runner-up
2001; Details	Easton, MA (Stonehill)	C.W. Post	13–9	West Chester
2002; Details	West Chester, PA (West Chester)	West Chester	11–6	Stonehill
2003; Details	Easton, MA (Stonehill)	Stonehill	9–8	Longwood
2004; Details	Orlando, FL	Adelphi	12–11	West Chester
2005; Details	West Chester, PA (West Chester)	Stonehill (2)	13–10	West Chester
2006; Details	Lisle, IL (Benedictine)	Adelphi (2)	16–8	West Chester
2007; Details	Salem, VA	C.W. Post (2)	15–7	West Chester
2008; Details	Houston, TX	West Chester (2)	13–12	C.W. Post
2009; Details	Salem, VA	Adelphi (3)	16–4	Lock Haven
2010; Details	Gettysburg, PA	Adelphi (4)	17–7	West Chester
2011; Details	Garden City, NY (Adelphi)	Adelphi (5)	17–4	Limestone
2012; Details	Louisville, KY (Bellarmine)	C.W. Post (3)	17–16	West Chester
2013; Details	Owings Mills, MD	C.W. Post (4)	10–7	Limestone
2014; Details	Salem, VA	Adelphi (6)	7–5	Lock Haven
2015; Details	Salem, VA	Adelphi (7)	5–4	Lock Haven
2016; Details	Denver, CO (Metro State)	Florida Southern	8-7	Adelphi
2017; Details	Bloomsburg, PA (Bloomsburg)	Adelphi (8)	6-4	Florida Southern
2018; Details	Tampa, FL (Tampa)	Le Moyne	16-11	Florida Southern
2019; Details	Allendale, MI (Grand Valley State)	Adelphi (9)	11–5	West Chester
2020	Canceled due to the COVID-19 pandemic			
2021; Details	Salem, VA (Mountain East Conference)	Lindenwood	14–12	Queens (NC)
2022; Details	St. Charles, MO (Lindenwood)	Indianapolis	11–9	East Stroudsburg
2023; Details	Indianapolis, IN (Indianapolis)	Pace	19–9	West Chester
2024; Details	Orlando, FL	Tampa	13–8	Adelphi
2025; Details	Salem, VA (Mountain East Conference)	Tampa (2)	15–9	Adelphi
2026; Details	Rochester, NY (RIT)	Florida Southern (2)	9–7	Maryville
2027	Tampa, FL (Tampa)			
2028				

== Champions ==
=== Active programs ===
Team	Titles	Years
Adelphi	9	2004, 2006, 2009, 2010, 2011, 2014, 2015, 2017, 2019
West Chester	2	2002, 2008
Tampa	2	2024, 2025
Florida Southern	2	2016, 2026
Pace	1	2023
Indianapolis	1	2022

=== Former programs ===
Team	Titles	Years
LIU Post (Note: The LIU Post athletic program was merged with the Division I program of Long Island University's Brooklyn campus in July 2019. The new program, playing as the LIU Sharks, maintains Brooklyn's Division I membership.)	4	2001, 2007, 2012, 2013
Stonehill	2	2003, 2005
Le Moyne	1	2018
Lindenwood	1	2021

=== Finals appearances by state ===
State	Titles	University	Runners-up	University
(New York (state)) New York	15	Adelphi (9), LIU Post (4), Le Moyne (1), Pace (1)	4	Adelphi (3), LIU Post (1)
Florida	4	Tampa (2), Florida Southern (2)	2	Florida Southern (2)
Pennsylvania	2	West Chester (2)	13	West Chester (9), Lock Haven (3), East Stroudsburg (1)
Massachusetts	2	Stonehill (2)	1	Stonehill (1)
Indiana	1	Indianapolis (1)	0	
Missouri	1	Lindenwood (1)	1	Maryville (1)
South Carolina	0		2	Limestone (2)
North Carolina	0		1	Queens (1)
Virginia	0		1	Longwood (1)

== See also ==
- NCAA women's lacrosse tournaments (Division I, Division III)
- NAIA women's lacrosse championship
