= 2013 NCAA Division I women's lacrosse tournament =

- Dates: May 10–26, 2013
- Teams: 26
- Finals site: Villanova Stadium; Villanova, Pennsylvania
- Champions: North Carolina (1st title)
- Runner-up: Maryland (17th title game)
- Semifinalists: Northwestern (9th Final Four); Syracuse (4th Final Four)
- Winning coach: Jenny Levy (1st title)
- MOP: Kara Cannizzaro, North Carolina
- Attendance: 9,391 finals 24,962 total

The 2013 NCAA Division I Women's Lacrosse Championship was the 32nd annual single-elimination tournament to determine the national champion of Division I NCAA women's college lacrosse. The semifinal and championship rounds were played at Villanova Stadium (the home of Villanova Wildcats football) from May 24–26, 2013.

The University of North Carolina defeated their ACC rival University of Maryland to win their first ever women's lacrosse championship.

== Tournament field ==
All NCAA Division I women's lacrosse programs were eligible for this championship, and a total of 26 teams were invited to participate. 13 teams qualified automatically by winning their conference tournaments while the remaining 13 teams qualified at-large based on their regular season records.

=== Teams ===
Seed	School	Conference	Berth type	RPI	Record
1	Maryland	ACC	Automatic	1	19–0
2	Northwestern	ALC	Automatic	2	17–2
3	North Carolina	ACC	At-large	3	14–3
4	Syracuse	Big East	Automatic	4	16–3
5	Florida	ALC	At-large	5	17–2
6	Georgetown	Big East	At-large	6	13–5
7	Penn State	ALC	At-large	11	12–6
8	Navy	Patriot League	Automatic	7	18–1
	Boston College	ACC	At-large	9	12–7
	Canisius	MAAC	Automatic	38	14–4
	Connecticut	Big East	At-large	17	13–4
	Dartmouth	Ivy League	At-large	24	10–7
	Denver	MPSF	At-large	13	17–2
	Duke	ACC	At-large	10	12–5
	High Point	Big South	Automatic	33	10–8
	Jacksonville	Atlantic Sun	Automatic	45	13–5
	Loyola (MD)	Big East	At-large	19	10–8
	Massachusetts	Atlantic 10	Automatic	8	17–2
	Monmouth	NEC	Automatic	39	13–6
	Notre Dame	Big East	At-large	15	12–4
	Penn	Ivy League	Automatic	14	11–5
	Princeton	Ivy League	At-large	21	10–6
	Stanford	MPSF	Automatic	18	13–5
	Stony Brook	America East	Automatic	12	16–2
	Towson	CAA	Automatic	22	10–8
	Virginia	ACC	At-large	16	9–9

== Tournament bracket ==
First round May 10
Stony Brook	8
Towson	6
Duke	10
Princeton	9
8	Navy	12
Monmouth	6
Denver	14
Jacksonville	7
Boston College	8
Dartmouth	11
Loyola (MD)	18
High Point	7
Penn	6
Virginia	12
7	Penn State	14
Canisius	13
Massachusetts	14
Connecticut	10
Notre Dame	7
Stanford	8

Second round May 12
1	Maryland	11
Stony Brook	3
Duke	10
8	Navy	5
5	Florida	16
Denver	5
4	Syracuse	21
Dartmouth	8
3	North Carolina	19
Loyola (MD)	9
6	Georgetown	8
Virginia	10
7	Penn State	12
Massachusetts	9
2	Northwestern	15
Stanford	8

Quarterfinals; May 18
1	Maryland	14
Duke	9
5	Florida	9
4	Syracuse	13
3	North Carolina	13
Virginia	9
7	Penn State	7
2	Northwestern	15

Semifinals; May 24; Villanova, Pennsylvania
1	Maryland	11
4	Syracuse	10
3	North Carolina	11
2	Northwestern	4

Championship; May 26; Villanova, Pennsylvania
1	Maryland	12
3	North Carolina	13
