= NCAA Division III women's lacrosse tournament =

Woman's lacrosse single-elimination tournament

- Association: NCAA
- Sport: Women's college lacrosse
- Founded: 1985; 41 years ago
- Division: Division III
- No. of teams: 46
- Country: United States
- Most recent champion: Middlebury (12th)
- Most titles: TCNJ/Middlebury (12 each)
- Broadcaster: ESPNU
- Website: NCAA.com

The NCAA Division III women's lacrosse tournament is annual single-elimination tournament hosted by the National Collegiate Athletic Association to determine the national champion women's collegiate lacrosse among its Division III members in the United States. It has been held every year since 1985, except for 2020.

Middlebury Panthers are the current champions, winning their twelfth title—and fifth consecutive—in 2026.

TCNJ, previously known as Trenton State also has won twelve titles.

== Results ==
See Association for Intercollegiate Athletics for Women Champions for the 1981 and 1982 Division III women's lacrosse champions.

NCAA Division III women's lacrosse tournament
Year	Site (Host Team)	Championship Results			Semifinalists
Year	Site (Host Team)	Champion	Score	Runner-up	Semifinalists
1985; Details	Philadelphia, PA (Penn)	Trenton State	7–4	Ursinus	Drew and Lynchburg
1986; Details	College Park, MD (Maryland)	Ursinus	12–10	Trenton State	Lynchburg and Wheaton (MA)
1987; Details	College Park, MD (Maryland)	Trenton State (2)	8–7 (OT)	Ursinus	Western Maryland and William Smith
1988; Details	Haverford, PA (Haverford)	Trenton State (3)	14–11	William Smith	Johns Hopkins and Ursinus
1989; Details	West Chester, PA (West Chester)	Ursinus (2)	8–6	Trenton State	St. Lawrence and William Smith
1990; Details	Princeton, NJ (Princeton)	Ursinus (3)	7–6	St. Lawrence	Roanoke and Trenton State
1991; Details	Ewing Township, NJ (Trenton State)	Trenton State (4)	7–6	Ursinus	Franklin & Marshall and William Smith
1992; Details	Bethlehem, PA (Lehigh)	Trenton State †	5-3	William Smith	Roanoke and Ursinus
1993; Details	College Park, MD (Maryland)	Trenton State (5)	10–9	William Smith	Franklin & Marshall and Johns Hopkins
1994; Details	College Park, MD (Maryland)	Trenton State (6)	29–11	William Smith	Johns Hopkins and Middlebury
1995; Details	Ewing Township, NJ (Trenton State)	Trenton State (7)	15–14	William Smith	Johns Hopkins and Middlebury
1996; Details	Bethlehem, PA (Lehigh)	TCNJ (8)	15–8	Middlebury	Goucher and Ursinus
1997; Details	Bethlehem, PA (Lehigh)	Middlebury	14–9	TCNJ	Johns Hopkins and William Smith
1998; Details	Baltimore, MD (UMBC)	TCNJ (9)	12–11 (OT)	Williams	Hartwick and Middlebury
1999; Details	Baltimore, MD (Johns Hopkins)	Middlebury (2)	10–9	Amherst	TCNJ and William Smith
2000; Details	Ewing Township, NJ (TCNJ)	TCNJ (10)	14–8	Williams	Middlebury and Salisbury State
2001; Details	Baltimore, MD (Johns Hopkins)	Middlebury (3)	11–10 (2OT)	Amherst	Mary Washington and TCNJ
2002; Details	Glassboro, NJ (Rowan)	Middlebury (4)	12–6	TCNJ	Amherst and Mary Washington
2003; Details	Rochester, NY (St. John Fisher)	Amherst	11–9	Middlebury	TCNJ and William Smith
2004; Details	Rochester, NY (St. John Fisher)	Middlebury (5)	13–11 (OT)	TCNJ	Amherst and Salisbury
2005; Details	Ewing Township, NJ (TCNJ)	TCNJ (11)	9–7	Salisbury	Colorado College and Middlebury
2006; Details	Hoboken, NJ (Stevens)	TCNJ (12)	10–4	Gettysburg	SUNY Cortland and Middlebury
2007; Details	Geneva, NY (William Smith)	Franklin & Marshall	11–8	Salisbury	Gettysburg and Middlebury
2008; Details	Salem, VA (Roanoke)	Hamilton	13–6	Franklin & Marshall	TCNJ and Salisbury
2009; Details	Salem, VA (Roanoke)	Franklin & Marshall (2)	11–10 (OT)	Salisbury	Gettysburg and Hamilton
2010; Details	Gettysburg, PA (Gettysburg)	Salisbury	7–6	Hamilton	Franklin & Marshall and Gettysburg
2011; Details	Garden City, NY (Adelphi)	Gettysburg	16–5	Bowdoin	SUNY Cortland and TCNJ
2012; Details	Montclair, NJ (Montclair State)	Trinity (CT)	8–7	Salisbury	SUNY Cortland and Middlebury
2013; Details	Stevenson, MD (Stevenson)	Salisbury (2)	12–5	Trinity (CT)	SUNY Cortland and Middlebury
2014; Details	Gettysburg, PA (Gettysburg)	Salisbury (3)	9–6	Trinity (CT)	Amherst and SUNY Cortland
2015; Details	Philadelphia, PA	Cortland	17-6	Trinity (CT)	Middlebury and Franklin & Marshall
2016; Details	Philadelphia, PA	Middlebury (6)	9-5	Trinity (CT)	SUNY Cortland and Franklin & Marshall
2017; Details	Salem, VA (Roanoke)	Gettysburg (2)	6-5	TCNJ	Trinity (CT) and Washington & Lee
2018; Details	Salem, VA (Roanoke)	Gettysburg (3)	11-9	Middlebury	Salisbury and TCNJ
2019; Details	Ashland, VA (Randolph–Macon)	Middlebury (7)	14–9	Salisbury	Tufts and Wesleyan
2020	Canceled due to COVID-19 pandemic				
2021; Details	Salem, VA (Roanoke)	Salisbury (4)	14-13	Tufts	Denison and St. John Fisher
2022; Details	Salem, VA (Roanoke)	Middlebury (8)	13–5	Tufts	Gettysburg and TCNJ
2023; Details	Salem, VA (Roanoke)	Middlebury (9)	17–9	Gettysburg	Franklin & Marshall and William Smith
2024; Details	Salem, VA (Roanoke)	Middlebury (10)	16–5	Salisbury	Franklin & Marshall and William Smith
2025; Details	Salem, VA (Roanoke)	Middlebury (11)	10–9	Tufts	Colby and Gettysburg
2026; Details	Rochester, NY (RIT)	Middlebury (12)	8–6	Wesleyan	Salisbury and Tufts
2027	Tampa, FL (Tampa)				
2028	Rochester, NY (RIT)				

† NCAA vacated the 1992 Trenton State title due to use of an ineligible player during the tournament

== Champions ==
=== Active programs ===
Team	Titles	Years
TCNJ (Trenton State)	12 (Note: NCAA vacated the 1992 Trenton State title due to use of an ineligible player during the tournament.)	1985, 1987, 1988, 1991, 1993, 1994, 1995, 1996, 1998, 2000, 2005, 2006
Middlebury	12	1997, 1999, 2001, 2002, 2004, 2016, 2019, 2022, 2023, 2024, 2025, 2026
Salisbury	4	2010, 2013, 2014, 2021
Gettysburg	3	2011, 2017, 2018
Ursinus	3	1986, 1989, 1990
Franklin & Marshall	2	2007, 2009
Cortland	1	2015
Trinity (CT)	1	2012
Hamilton	1	2008
Amherst	1	2003

=== Finals appearances by state ===
State	Titles	University	Runners-up	University
New Jersey	12	TCNJ (12)	6	TCNJ (6)
Vermont	12	Middlebury (12)	3	Middlebury (3)
Pennsylvania	8	Gettysburg (3), Ursinus (3), Franklin & Marshall (2)	6	Ursinus (3), Gettysburg (2), Franklin & Marshall (1)
Maryland	4	Salisbury (4)	6	Salisbury (6)
(New York (state)) New York	2	Cortland (1), Hamilton (1)	7	William Smith (5), Hamilton (1), St. Lawrence (1)
Massachusetts	1	Amherst (1)	7	Tufts (3), Amherst (2), Williams (2)
Connecticut	1	Trinity (1)	5	Trinity (4), Wesleyan (1)
Maine	0		1	Bowdoin (1)

== See also ==
- AIAW Intercollegiate Women's Lacrosse Champions
- NCAA women's lacrosse championships (Division I, Division II)
- NCAA men's lacrosse championships (Division I, Division II, Division III)
