= Stony Brook Seawolves women's lacrosse =

American women's college lacrosse team

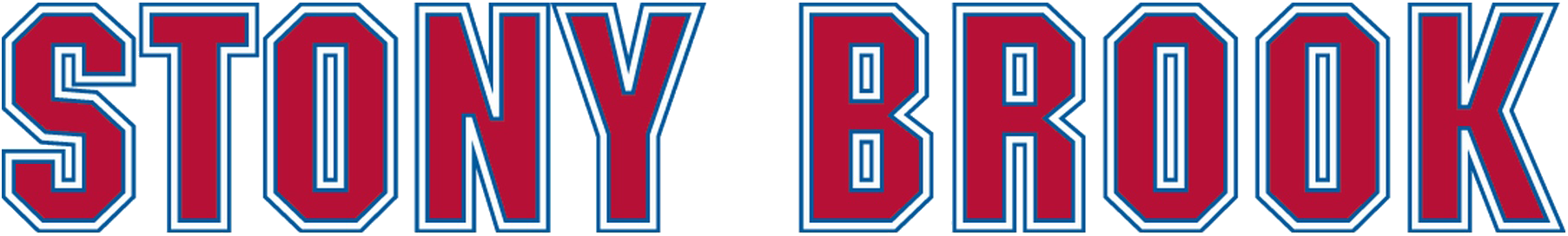
- Founded: 2003; 23 years ago
- University: Stony Brook University
- Head coach: Joe Spallina (13th season)
- Stadium: Kenneth P. LaValle Stadium (capacity: 12,300)
- Location: Stony Brook, New York
- Conference: Coastal Athletic Association
- Nickname: Seawolves
- Colors: Red, blue, and gray

NCAA Tournament Quarterfinals
- 2017, 2018, 2021, 2022, 2026

NCAA Tournament appearances
- 2013, 2014, 2015, 2016, 2017, 2018, 2019, 2021, 2022, 2023, 2024, 2025, 2026

Conference Tournament championships
- 2013, 2014, 2015, 2016, 2017, 2018, 2019, 2021, 2023, 2024, 2025, 2026

Conference regular season championships
- 2007, 2013, 2014, 2015, 2016, 2017, 2018, 2019, 2021, 2022, 2023, 2024, 2025, 2026

The Stony Brook Seawolves women's lacrosse team is a college women's lacrosse program representing Stony Brook University. The school competes in the Coastal Athletic Association (CAA) in Division I of the National Collegiate Athletic Association (NCAA). The team plays its home games at Kenneth P. LaValle Stadium, located on the university's campus in Stony Brook, New York.

Stony Brook has appeared in 13 consecutive NCAA Tournaments since 2013, advancing to the quarterfinals five times. Stony Brook completed an undefeated regular season in 2018, in which the Seawolves were ranked at No. 1 in all major polls for nearly the entire year. From 2017 to 2019, Stony Brook won 29 straight regular season games. The Seawolves currently own a 99-game winning streak in conference play, the longest active streak in any Division I sport.

Under head coach Joe Spallina, Stony Brook has built an identity of a national powerhouse constructed out of overlooked Long Island recruits. Kylie Ohlmiller, who played for Stony Brook from 2015 to 2018, holds both the NCAA career and single season records for points and assists. Courtney Murphy, who played for Stony Brook from 2014 to 2018, broke the NCAA career and single season records for goals.

== History ==
=== Formation and beginnings (2001–2011) ===
Stony Brook University formed their women's lacrosse team in 2001 with Danie Caro as their first head coach, with the announcement that the program would begin play during the 2003 season. In the team's first season, the Seawolves finished in third place in the conference but advanced to the semifinals in the America East playoffs, losing 15–4 to Boston University.

Caro left the program in 2005 and was replaced by former Maryland player and four-time national champion Allison Comito. Under Comito, the Seawolves returned to the semifinal round of the America East playoffs in both 2006 and 2007. The 2007 team went 13–4, the first time Stony Brook had won double-digit games, and the team tied for first place in the America East. Comito resigned following the 2011 season, amassing a 42–54 record in her six-year tenure as head coach.

=== Spallina establishes success (2012–2014) ===
Joe Spallina, who had won three straight Division II titles as the coach at Adelphi University, succeeded Comito. In Spallina's first season, the Seawolves improved their win total by ten, from 4 to 14, as the Seawolves finished second in the America East. Stony Brook defeated UMBC 9–7 in the America East semifinals before losing to Albany in the conference finals, falling one game short of their first NCAA Tournament. Stony Brook finished with a 14–5 record in Spallina's first season as head coach.

Stony Brook had their most successful season yet in 2013, going undefeated in conference play for the first time, winning their second regular season conference championship and beating Vermont 18–4 and Albany 14–3 in the America East playoffs to win their first America East Tournament and advance to their first NCAA Tournament. There, they defeated Towson 8–6 in the first round for their first NCAA Tournament victory but lost in the second round to No. 1 Maryland. Still, the team's final 17–3 record bore the program the most single-season wins to date, beginning the first of six consecutive conference championships. For the first time in team history, Stony Brook was ranked Top 10 in a major national poll. Also on March 9, 2013, against Longwood, Claire Petersen set the NCAA single-game assist record with 11.

Stony Brook returned to the NCAA Tournament in 2014 after a 17–4 season where they tied for first place in the America East regular season, including victories over New Hampshire and Albany in the America East playoffs. In the first round, the Seawolves faced Towson again and won 10–8, advancing to the second round where they lost to Syracuse. Spallina became Stony Brook's all-time winningest coach after the season.

=== Ohlmiller and Murphy break records (2015–2018) ===
In 2015, the first season which Kylie Ohlmiller and Courtney Murphy played together, Stony Brook finished with an 18–2 record. On March 17, the Seawolves beat No. 6/7 Florida on the road in Gainesville, the team's first victory over a Top 10-ranked opponent in program history. They started the season 11–0 before losing to No. 20 Johns Hopkins. After disposing of UMBC and Albany in the America East Tournament, Stony Brook earned the No. 6 seed in their third straight NCAA Tournament appearance. Coming out of a first round bye, the Seawolves lost 8–4 to Princeton.

Stony Brook entered the 2016 season ranked No. 11/8. Although they lost to ranked opponents Florida, Northwestern, and USC to start the season 2–3, the Seawolves would embark on a 15-game winning streak, including wins against No. 9/8 Stanford and No. 20 Johns Hopkins. Stony Brook captured their fourth straight America East title after defeating New Hampshire and Albany in the America East Playoffs; the finals victory came on a last-second comeback. Stony Brook beat Boston College 11–9 in the first round of the NCAA Tournament before losing 7–6 to No. 4–seeded Syracuse in the second round. Murphy broke the NCAA single-season record with 100 goals.

Preseason polls ranked Stony Brook at No. 6/5 to begin the 2017 season. Their lone regular season loss came on March 11, 2017, at No. 3 Florida. Murphy tore her ACL four games into her senior season, but earned an extra year of eligibility. Sweeping the America East for the third consecutive year, Stony Brook beat ranked opponents such as No. 12 Northwestern, No. 9 USC, and No. 4 Colorado before taking down New Hampshire and Albany in the America East playoffs to win their fifth straight conference title and NCAA Tournament appearance. Stony Brook was seeded eighth in a controversial move that was later attributed to New York governor Andrew Cuomo's state-sanctioned travel ban to the state of North Carolina due to the Public Facilities Privacy & Security Act. The Seawolves defeated Bryant 21–6 in the first round and Northwestern 13–9 in the second round to advance to the first NCAA Quarterfinal in program history, where they lost to undefeated No. 1–seeded Maryland 13–12. Stony Brook, despite leading 11–7, could not pull off the upset victory. With 164 points and 86 assists, Kylie Ohlmiller broke the previous NCAA single-season records in both statistics.

Stony Brook was ranked No. 2 to enter the 2018 season, which began with victories against No. 5 USC, No. 23 Stanford, No. 20 Denver, No. 8 Northwestern, and No. 13 Towson. After starting the season 3–0, Stony Brook earned the No. 1 ranking in all three major polls because former No. 1 Maryland lost in overtime to North Carolina. Stony Brook ended the regular season undefeated at 17–0 and beat New Hampshire and Albany in the America East Playoffs to win their sixth straight conference title. Despite a 19–0 record, Stony Brook controversially earned the No. 5 seed in the NCAA Tournament. They defeated Penn 18–5 in the second round. In the quarterfinals, Stony Brook battled fourth-seeded Boston College to double overtime before losing 12–11 on a last-second goal.

=== Last years in the America East (2019–2022) ===
The 2019 season, the team's first since graduating Kylie Ohlmiller, began with a No. 4/6 ranking and a victory against No. 13 Colorado. However, the Seawolves lost at No. 16 Denver on February 24, snapping their 29–game regular season winning streak. On March 3, Stony Brook lost 15–12 at home to Stanford, breaking the team's 33–game home winning streak. Spallina earned his 200th victory on March 16, 2019, against Cornell. After a 11–10 home loss to No. 20 Florida, Stony Brook was unranked but re-entered the polls following defeats of No. 17 Johns Hopkins and No. 14 USC. The Seawolves swept America East play for the fifth consecutive season to win their seventh straight regular season title. In the America East playoffs, Stony Brook took down UMBC and Albany to win their seventh straight America East championship. In the first round of the NCAA Tournament, Stony Brook upset defending champions James Madison 10–9 in overtime. In the second round, Stony Brook jumped out to a quick 4–0 lead against No. 1 Maryland, but ultimately lost 17–8 to snap their 12-game winning streak and end their season.

In 2020, Stony Brook began the season ranked No. 12, and upset No. 4 Syracuse in the Carrier Dome 17–16 in the season opener. They beat Ohio State 20–7 to move up to No. 3 in the rankings before losing to No. 8 Florida on the road. Stony Brook rebounded with home victories over Towson and No. 11 Princeton. On March 12, the NCAA cancelled all spring sports due to the COVID-19 pandemic. Stony Brook ended the season with a 4–1 record and ranked at No. 5 in all three national polls.

In the 2021 season opener, Stony Brook lost 14–7 to No. 1 North Carolina. The Seawolves beat No. 15 USC 15–3, lost to No. 2 Syracuse 16–6 and rebounded by beating No. 16 Towson 10–8. Stony Brook went undefeated in conference play again and easily won the conference tournament to enter the NCAA Tournament as the No. 8 seed on a 12-game win streak. Stony Brook beat Towson 14–8 in the first round and Rutgers 20–8 in the second round to set up a rematch with top-seeded North Carolina in the quarterfinals. The Seawolves led 11–9 late and were eight minutes away from their first Final Four in program history, but the Tar Heels came back to win 14–11 and snap Stony Brook's 14-game win streak, ending their season at 16–3.

Before the season, Spallina's contract was extended through 2026. In the 2022 opener, No. 4 Stony Brook lost to No. 3 Syracuse 12–11 at the Carrier Dome. They beat No. 11 Florida 14–13 then lost to No. 5 Northwestern 16–12, both on the road. Then, Stony Brook won 14 straight games, including ranked wins over No. 16 Johns Hopkins, No. 10 Princeton and No. 24 Yale. The America East Conference banned Stony Brook from the conference tournament because of its impending move to the Colonial Athletic Association, marking the first time since 2012 that the Seawolves did not win it. However, Stony Brook earned an at-large bid to the 2022 NCAA Tournament as the No. 8 seed, beating Drexel and Rutgers to rematch No. 1 North Carolina in the quarterfinals. UNC won again, 8–5.

=== Entering the CAA (2023–present) ===
In Stony Brook's first year as a member of the Colonial Athletic Association, the 2023 Seawolves began 4–0 with ranked wins over No. 18 Michigan, No. 21 Yale and No. 17 Stanford before falling at No. 3 Northwestern and No. 1 Syracuse. On April 12, Stony Brook lost 12–7 at Rutgers, the program's first loss to an unranked team since 2019. The Seawolves finished 7–0 in CAA play and also won the CAA Tournament in their first year, beating Delaware 18–6 in the quarterfinals and Towson 19–4 in the championship game. Stony Brook broke the record for most goals scored and margin of victory in a CAA title game. However, Stony Brook was unseeded in the NCAA Tournament for the first time since 2019. Stony Brook beat Penn State 12–8 in the first round but lost to eight-seed Loyola 9–8 in the second round, the first time the Seawolves did not advance past that stage since 2019.

On March 5, 2024, No. 12 Stony Brook upset No. 5 Syracuse 13–12 in overtime at the JMA Wireless Dome, the program's fifth-ever win against a top-five opponent. The 2024 team finished with a 18-3 overall record and defeated Niagara 19-7 in the NCAA first round. Stony Brook lost to Syracuse 15-10 in the second round.

In 2025, the Seawolves ended the season 16-5. Stony Brook defeated Loyola Maryland in the NCAA tournament first round and lost to #2 Boston College in the second round.

In 2026, Stony Brook returned to the NCAA tournament quarterfinals for the first time since 2022 following wins over Stonehill and Boston College in the first two rounds.

== Individual career records ==
Record	Amount	Player	Years
Goals	341*	Courtney Murphy	2014–18
Assists	246*	Kylie Ohlmiller	2015–18
Points	498*	Kylie Ohlmiller	2015–18
Ground balls	189	Kaitlin Leggio	2006–09
Draw controls	390	Ellie Masera	2021–24
Caused turnovers	125	Danielle Werner	2003–06

An asterisk indicates the all-time NCAA record.

== Individual single-season records ==
Record	Amount	Player	Year
Goals	100*	Courtney Murphy	2016
Assists	86*	Kylie Ohlmiller	2017
Points	164*	Kylie Ohlmiller	2017
Ground balls	73	Beth Arikian	2003
Draw controls	145	Ellie Masera	2024
Caused turnovers	66	Avery Hines	2024

An asterisk indicates the all-time NCAA record.

== Seasons ==
Record table
Season	Coach	Overall	Conference	Standing	Postseason
NCAA Division I (America East Conference) (2003–2022)
2003	Danie Caro	7–10	2–3	T–3rd	
2004	Danie Caro	6–9	2–4	5th	
2005	Danie Caro	8–7	2–4	5th	
2006	Allison Comito	9–9	4–2	T-3rd	
2007	Allison Comito	13–4	5–1	T–1st	
2008	Allison Comito	9–6	2–4	T–4th	
2009	Allison Comito	4–12	1–5	6th	
2010	Allison Comito	3–12	1–5	T–5th	
2011	Allison Comito	4–11	1–5	T–6th	
2012	Joe Spallina	14–5	5–1	2nd	
2013	Joe Spallina	17–3	6–0	1st	NCAA Second Round
2014	Joe Spallina	17–4	4–1	T–1st	NCAA Second Round
2015	Joe Spallina	18–2	6–0	1st	NCAA Second Round
2016	Joe Spallina	17–4	6–0	1st	NCAA Second Round
2017	Joe Spallina	20–2	6–0	1st	NCAA Quarterfinal
2018	Joe Spallina	20–1	7–0	1st	NCAA Quarterfinal
2019	Joe Spallina	16–5	7–0	1st	NCAA Second Round
2020	Joe Spallina	4–1	0–0		Season canceled due to COVID-19
2021	Joe Spallina	16–3	8–0	1st	NCAA Quarterfinal
2022	Joe Spallina	16–3	6–0	1st	NCAA Quarterfinal
NCAA Division I (Colonial/Coastal Athletic Association) (2023–present)
2023	Joe Spallina	15–4	7–0	1st	NCAA Second Round
2024	Joe Spallina	18–3	8–0	1st	NCAA Second Round
2025	Joe Spallina	16–5	8–0	1st	NCAA Second Round
2026	Joe Spallina	19–3	7–0	1st	NCAA Quarterfinal
Total:		287–126 (.695)			
National champion Postseason invitational champion Conference regular season champion Conference regular season and conference tournament champion Division regular season champion Division regular season and conference tournament champion Conference tournament champion

== Postseason results ==
The Seawolves have appeared in 13 NCAA tournaments. Their postseason record is 16–13.

Year	Seed	Round	Opponent	Score
2013	–	First Round; Second Round	Towson #1 Maryland	W, 8–6; L, 3–11
2014	–	First Round; Second Round	Towson #2 Syracuse	W, 10–8; L, 6–13
2015	#6	Second Round	Princeton	L, 4–8
2016	–	First Round; Second Round	Boston College #4 Syracuse	W, 11–9; L, 6–7
2017	#8	First Round; Second Round; Quarterfinal	Bryant; Northwestern #1 Maryland	W, 21–6; W, 13–9; L, 12–13
2018	#5	Second Round; Quarterfinal	Penn #4 Boston College	W, 18–5; L, 11–12 (2OT)
2019	–	First Round; Second Round	James Madison #1 Maryland	W, 10–9 (OT); L, 8–17
2021	#8	First Round; Second Round; Quarterfinal	Towson; Rutgers #1 North Carolina	W, 14–8; W, 20–8; L, 11–14
2022	#8	First Round; Second Round; Quarterfinal	Drexel; Rutgers #1 North Carolina	W, 16–4; W, 11–7; L, 5–8
2023	–	First Round; Second Round	Penn State #8 Loyola	W, 12–8; L, 8–9
2024	–	First Round; Second Round	Niagara #3 Syracuse	W, 19–7; L, 10–15
2025	–	First Round; Second Round	Loyola #2 Boston College	W, 11–8; L, 7–10
2026	#5	First Round; Second Round; Quarterfinal	Stonehill; Boston College #4 Johns Hopkins	W, 19–5; W, 10–9; L, 12–13

== Program leaders ==
=== Career ===
Points
Rk	Player	Points
1	Kylie Ohlmiller	498*
2	Taryn Ohlmiller	413
3	Courtney Murphy	406
4	Ally Kennedy	329
5	Ellie Masera	317

Goals
Rk	Player	Goals
1	Courtney Murphy	341*
2	Ally Kennedy	266
3	Kylie Ohlmiller	252
4	Ellie Masera	232
5	Kailyn Hart	230

Assists
Rk	Player	Assists
1	Kylie Ohlmiller	246*
2	Taryn Ohlmiller	194
3	Carlee Buck	135
4	Claire Petersen	105
5	Kaitlin Leggio	96

=== Single season ===
Points
Rk	Player	Points	Year
1	Kylie Ohlmiller	164*	2017
2	Kylie Ohlmiller	157	2018
3	Courtney Murphy	130	2018
4	Ellie Masera	117	2024
5	Courtney Murphy	116	2016

Goals
Rk	Player	Goals	Year
1	Courtney Murphy	100*	2016
2	Courtney Murphy	95	2018
3	Demianne Cook	90	2013
4	Kylie Ohlmiller	88	2018
5	Ally Kennedy	85	2019

Assists
Rk	Player	Assists	Year
1	Kylie Ohlmiller	86*	2017
2	Kylie Ohlmiller	69	2018
3	Claire Petersen	59	2012
4	Taryn Ohlmiller	56	2021
5	Taryn Ohlmiller	55	2018
