= Kylie Ohlmiller =

American professional lacrosse player (born 1996)

Personal information
- Born: September 24, 1996 (age 30) Islip, New York, U.S.
- Height: 5 ft 3 in (160 cm)

Sport
- Position: Attack
- Shoots: Left
- NCAA team: Stony Brook (2018)

Career highlights
- 2× Tewaaraton Trophy finalist (2017, 2018); IWLCA Division I Attacker of the Year (2017); 2× Inside Lacrosse first-team All-American (2017, 2018); 2× IWLCA first-team All-American (2017, 2018); IWLCA second-team All-American (2016); IWLCA third-team All-American (2015); 2× America East Offensive Player of the Year (2017, 2018); 4× first-team All-America East (2015–2018) NCAA records: 498 career points; 164 points, single season; 246 career assists; 84 assists, single season

Kylie Ohlmiller (born September 24, 1996) is an American professional women's lacrosse player for the New York Charging of the Women's Lacrosse League (WLL). She played collegiately at Stony Brook University, where she set the record for most career points in Division I history with 498 and most career assists with 246.

She played professionally for the now-defunct United Women's Lacrosse League, being selected first overall by the Boston Storm in the 2018 UWLX draft and the now-defunct Women's Professional Lacrosse League, selected first overall by the New York Fight. From 2021 to 2024, she played for Athletes Unlimited Lacrosse before the league folded.

Ohlmiller was crowned "the face of women’s lacrosse" by The New York Times and "a human highlight reel" by ESPN. She has been a member of the United States women's national lacrosse team since 2017. Ohlmiller has signed endorsement deals with New Balance and Brine Lacrosse. Ohlmiller is also the founder of KO17 Lacrosse, a lacrosse training organization which hosts camps, clinics and online instruction.

== Early life and high school ==
Ohlmiller was born in Islip, New York, where she attended Islip High School. While she missed her freshman year of high school with an injury, she was named a team captain during her sophomore, junior and senior years, scoring over 250 points and being named a two-time Academic All-American. After scoring 112 goals in her senior year of high school, Ohlmiller was named a US Lacrosse All-American. She also played volleyball and basketball in high school. As high schoolers, both Ohlmiller and future college teammate Courtney Murphy watched Northwestern beat Syracuse in the 2012 NCAA championship game held at Stony Brook's Kenneth P. LaValle Stadium.

== College career ==
Before her freshman season even began, Spallina said of Ohlmiller that "before she’s out of here, she’ll be a very strong candidate to win the Tewaaraton." In her collegiate debut on February 21, 2015 against USC, Ohlmiller recorded two assists. She scored her first career goal against Drexel and tied the program freshman record for assists against Villanova. She was named America East Rookie of the Week six times, Inside Lacrosse National Rookie of the Week three times and Inside Lacrosse National Player of the Week after guiding Stony Brook to a victory over No. 5 Northwestern, Stony Brook's first win over a top-five team in school history. She ended her freshman season with 42 goals and 44 assists for 86 points.

In her sophomore year, Ohlmiller scored 91 points, the fifth-most in the country, and recorded 47 assists, the fourth-most. She earned IWLCA Player of the Week once and America East Player of the Week three times. She set a new career high with six goals against Vermont and earned a spot on the SportsCenter Top 10 for a no-look, behind-the-back goal she scored against Johns Hopkins.

Ohlmiller's junior season was record-breaking. With 78 goals and 86 assists, she scored 164 points, breaking Maryland's Jen Adams' Division I single-season record of 148 points set in 2001. Ohlmiller became the first player in Division I history to record 70 goals and 70 assists in the same season. Her 86 assists broke Hannah Nielsen of Northwestern's record for 83 assists in a season, set in 2009. Ohlmiller set an America East record with eight assists in a game against New Hampshire. A behind-the-back assist to her sister Taryn Ohlmiller in that game earned her another SportsCenter Top 10 appearance. She was named a finalist for the Tewaaraton Award, the first ever in Stony Brook history, the IWLCA Division I Attacker of the Year, a first-team IWLCA and ILWomen All-American selection and America East Offensive Player of the Year. She scored a career-high 12 points against Bryant. Stony Brook ended the season 20–2 with a loss in the 2017 NCAA Tournament quarterfinals to Maryland, the furthest the program had advanced yet; Stony Brook led 11–7 in the second half before Maryland came back to win 13–12. Ohlmiller had seven points in the game, coming from three points and four assists.

As a senior, Ohlmiller led Stony Brook to its first-ever No. 1 ranking in all three national polls. She led the country with 157 points, coming from 88 goals and a nation-leading 69 assists. She had five 10-point games and ended the season by scoring at least five points in 20 straight games. Ohlmiller was named a Tewaaraton Award finalist for the second straight year and was again named an Inside Lacrosse and IWLCA first team All-American, America East Offensive Player of the Year and first-team All-America East. On April 14, 2018, Stony Brook held "Kylie Ohlmiller Bobblehead Night" against Johns Hopkins, attracting a single-game program record 3,123 fans. She became the first Stony Brook female student-athlete to receive a bobblehead. On April 21 against UMBC, Ohlmiller broke both the NCAA career points and assists records, previously held by Jen Adams (445) and Hannah Nielsen (224), respectively. She was named the 2017–18 America East Woman of the Year. Stony Brook began the season 20–0 and advanced to the quarterfinals of the 2018 NCAA Tournament, where the Seawolves lost to Boston College 12–11 in double overtime to end their perfect season bid.

Ohlmiller ended her career with 498 career points and 246 career assists, both NCAA records. She also scored 252 goals, second-most in Stony Brook history behind teammate Courtney Murphy's 341 career goals, an NCAA record. Her 252 career goals were the 16th-most in NCAA history.

From 2019 to 2021, Ohlmiller also served as a volunteer assistant coach for Stony Brook after her graduation.

Ohlmiller was inducted into the Stony Brook Rita & Kurt Eppenstein Athletics Hall of Fame during the class of 2023.

== College statistics ==
Season	GP	G	A	Pts	PPG
2015	20	42	44	86	4.30
2016	21	44	47	91	4.33
2017	22	78	86*	164*	7.45
2018	22	88	69	157	7.14
Totals	84	252	246*	498*	5.17

Asterisks indicate NCAA Division I all-time record.

== National team career ==
Ohlmiller tried out for the United States women's national lacrosse team in 2016 and made the 36-man roster for the 2017 team. She trained for the 2017 Federation of International Lacrosse Women's World Cup held in Guildford, England but did not make the final 18-player roster for competition. She made the 36-man roster again in 2021 and was named to the final 18-player roster ahead of the 2022 World Championship, along with her Stony Brook teammate Ally Kennedy.

On July 7, 2022, in the world championship semifinals against Australia, Ohlmiller tore her anterior cruciate ligament (ACL), medial collateral ligament (MCL) and meniscus.

== Professional career ==
Ohlmiller was selected as the first overall draft pick in the 2018 United Women's Lacrosse League (UWLX) and the Women's Professional Lacrosse League (WPLL) drafts. Both leagues are now defunct.

Players in the WPLL, including Ohlmiller, moved on to the Athletes Unlimited Lacrosse league after the former folded in 2020 after the COVID-19 pandemic. She signed with Athletes Unlimited in March 2021.

Ohlmiller missed the 2022 season with a torn ACL, MCL and meniscus that she suffered in the 2022 World Lacrosse Women's World Championship semifinals.

Ohlmiller returned during the 2023 season, recording 19 goals and 10 assists while tying the AU single-game record with six goals in Week 4. In November 2023, while training for the 2024 World Lacrosse Box Championships, Ohlmiller tore her ACL again. AU Lacrosse was shut down indefinitely in December 2024.

In 2025, the Women's Lacrosse League became the lone professional women's lacrosse league in the United States. Ohlmiller was named to the roster of the New York Charging team. Making her return from her second torn ACL, she scored the league's first-ever goal on February 11, 2025 in a 14–13 win over the Maryland Charm.

== Retirement ==
Ohlmiller announced her retirement from professional lacrosse on January 22, 2026.

== Broadcasting career ==
Ohlmiller served as a color analyst for the Coastal Athletic Association broadcasts of Stony Brook women's lacrosse teams from 2022 to 2024. In 2024, while recovering from her second torn ACL, Ohlmiller joined the broadcast team for the Athletes Unlimited Pro Lacrosse season.

== Personal life ==
Ohlmiller's younger sister, Taryn, also played for Stony Brook from 2017 to 2021. The two sisters were teammates for the 2017 and 2018 seasons, and Taryn graduated in 2021 with the second-most goals and assists in Stony Brook program history behind Kylie.

Ohlmiller is known for her Batman-inspired eye black pattern which she always wears to competition.

Ohlmiller began dating fellow Stony Brook lacrosse alumnus Ryland Rees in 2021. The two were engaged in 2024.
