= High Point Panthers women's lacrosse =

- Founded: 2011
- University: High Point University
- Head coach: Lyndsey Boswell (since 2011 season)
- Stadium: Vert Stadium (Capacity: 1,100 Chair, 3,000 Total)
- Location: High Point, North Carolina
- Conference: Big South Conference
- Nickname: Panthers
- Colors: Purple and white

NCAA Tournament appearances
- 2013, 2014, 2017, 2018, 2019, 2021

Conference Tournament championships
- 2011, 2013, 2014, 2017, 2018, 2019, 2021

Conference regular season championships
- 2012, 2014, 2017, 2018, 2019, 2021, 2022

The High Point Panthers women's lacrosse team is an NCAA Division I college lacrosse team representing High Point University as part of the Big South Conference. They play their home games at Vert Stadium in High Point, North Carolina.

== History ==
In September 2008, High Point athletics director Craig Keilitz announced the formation of a women's lacrosse team. A nationwide search was conducted for its first head coach, and Lyndsey Boswell was hired the following summer. Boswell was a 2005 graduate of Pfeiffer, where she was a two-time IWLCA All-American and was the Carolinas-Virginia Athletics Conference player of the year in 2004. Boswell also set program records in goals, assists, and points. She was an assistant coach at Pfeiffer from 2005 to 2006, before landing her first head coaching job at St. Andrews in 2007. From 2007 to 2009, she coached the Knights to an increasing number of wins each year, culminating in 11 in 2009. In June 2009, Boswell became head coach at High Point, and after a year and a half of recruiting, the Panthers' first Division I season was in spring 2011. Through the 2018 season, Boswell has led the team to a 108–46 record, including a 39–4 mark in the Big South.

The program has had a successful existence, having reached the conference tournament championship game in either the National Lacrosse Conference or the Big South Conference every year except for 2015. The team won a conference tournament in 2011 and a regular-season championship in 2012 in the National Lacrosse Conference before the league folded.

In 2013 the Big South Conference began sponsoring women's lacrosse and was also granted an automatic berth to the NCAA tournament. The Panthers joined the new league and have won the conference tournament in 2013, 2014, and 2017. In 2013, after an 8–8 regular season, High Point won the Big South tournament title, but lost 18–7 to Loyola (MD) in the NCAA tournament. In 2014, for the second straight year, the Panthers scheduled four eventual tournament teams. While they lost all four, the stiff competition prepared them well for the Big South, where they swept the rest of the teams en route to another NCAA tournament appearance, an 18–4 loss to Notre Dame.

2015 was a rebuilding year for the Panthers, who won just one game on the road en route to an 8–10 record. The team finished fourth in the Big South Conference and lost to Winthrop in the conference tournament semifinal.

In 2016, the Panthers finished 13–6, with a quality 15–9 win over No. 21 James Madison, but again ran into Winthrop in the conference tournament championship, losing 7–10.

2017 saw the Panthers get off to a rough start, falling to eventual NCAA Tournament teams North Carolina, Elon, and James Madison. However, the Panthers regained their footing by winning their last six nonconference games. Led by five players who scored 38+ goals, the Panthers swept through the Big South regular season and captured the conference tournament championship, outscoring every opponent by 7+ goals. The program garnered its first NCAA tournament win (and the first in High Point Panthers history) by defeating Towson, 21–15. The team then faced top-seeded Maryland, where they lost 6-21, ending a team record 16-game win streak.

In 2018, led by Tewaaraton Award Watch List nominee Erica Perrotta, and freshman Abby Hormes, who scored 59 goals, the Panthers returned to the NCAA tournament. After two early losses to eventual top-3 seeds UNC and James Madison, the Panthers rattled off sixteen straight wins, including triumphs over at the time #21 Notre Dame and #19 Duke. The Panthers rose as high as #16 in the national rankings before a 19-10 first-round defeat to Denver in the NCAA tournament.

In 2019, led by Big South Offensive Player of the year Abby Hormes the Panthers won their 3rd straight Big South Championship. The season started with a few notable losses to #2 UNC 9–13, #7 JMU 5–12, and #16 Florida 15–16. The season took a big turn after toppling #14 Johns Hopkins 13–10, which is the highest ranked win against a top 25 team in program history. High Point ranked as high as #20 in the national rankings. The panthers would go on to the NCAA tournament where they had a first round loss to #14 Navy 16–5.

The 2020 Season had high hopes as the Panthers were pre season Big South favorites. High Point got off to a good start before hitting a wall going up against #1 UNC losing 24–3. Then falling to #17 JMU 13–8, and #5 Florida 17-10 which was the last game of the season due to the COVID-19 pandemic. High Point also ranked as high as #20 in the nation during the brief 2020 season.

In 2021, the Panthers led by Big South Offensive player of the year Senior Abby Hormes. High Point had a heartbreaking loss in OT to #11 JMU 9–10. High Point would go on to have a 10–8 season. High Point went on to win the Big South Tournament and play in the NCAA tournament where they ended their season to defending national champions Maryland 6–17.

2022 saw the Panthers get off to really rough start going 0-5 and in that stretch dropping to #6 Duke 13–22. They also lost to #1 UNC 9-23. However, they turned the season around with the help of Abby Hormes having a career season. The Panthers went on a 8-game win streak to end the regular season as the Big South tournament #1 seed. The Panthers finished the season with a 10–9 record. The season ended as the panthers were upset in the Big South Championship by #2 Mercer 13–16. Abby Hormes set the NCAA all-time single season goal scoring record scoring her 103 goal.

The team partners with the Friends of Jaclyn Foundation, which is "an organization created to encourage NCAA athletic programs to sponsor pediatric brain tumor patients". Each April since 2013, the team has held a charity 5K to raise money for the foundation.

== Individual awards ==
NCAA All Time Single Season Goal Scorer

- Abby Hormes - 2022

Big South All Decade Team

- Abby Hormes, (A)
- Samantha Herman, (M)
- Jasmine Jordan, (M)
- Erica Perrotta, (M)
- Meredith Chapman, (D)
- Christina Del Sesto, (D)
- Lyndsey Boswell, (C)

Big South Offensive Player of the Year

- Mackenzie Carroll - 2014
- Samantha Brown - 2017
- Abby Hormes - 2019, 2021, 2022

Big South Defensive Player of the Year

- Jasmine Jordan - 2013, 2014
- Christina Del Sesto - 2017
- Erica Perrotta - 2018
- Meredith Chapman - 2019
- Ashley Britton - 2021

Big South Coach of the Year

- Lyndsey Boswell - 2014, 2016, 2017, 2018, 2021, 2022

Big South Scholar Athlete of the Year

- Jasmine Jordan - 2014
- Meredith Chapman - 2019

Big South Tournament MVP

- Jasmine Jordan - 2013
- Alec Perry - 2014
- Christina Del Sesto - 2017
- Samantha Herman - 2018
- Abby Hormes - 2019, 2021

Big South Freshman of the Year

- Abby Hormes - 2018
- Mandy Brockamp - 2022

Big South Team Sportsmanship Award

- 2015, 2016, 2018

Wanda Watkins Female Athlete of the Year

- Abby Hormes - 2021-2022

Big South Offensive Player of the Week

- Mackenzie Carroll - 4/1- 2013
- Alec Perry - 4/22 - 2013
- Darla Poulin - 3/7 - 2017 | 2/20 - 2018
- Brooke Stevens - 3/21, 4/11 - 2017 | 4/3, 4/17 - 2018
- Samantha Brown - 3/28 - 2017
- Erica Perrotta - 3/6, 4/10 - 2018
- Samantha Herman - 2/12 - 2019
- Ashley Britton - 3/5 - 2019 | 2/11 - 2020 | 2/16, 3/23 - 2021
- Abby Hormes - 3/12, 4/9 - 2019 | 2021 - 3/9, 3/16, 4/13, 4/20 | 2022 - 2/15, 3/22, 4/12, 4/19, 4/26
- Allie Little - 4/23 - 2019

Big South Defensive Player of the Week

- Anna Wallingford - 2/18 - 2013
- Jasmine Jordan - 2/25, 4/8, 4/22 - 2013 | 2014 - 2/25, 4/22, 4/28
- Patricia Bigelow - 2/10, 4/7 - 2014
- Julia Burns - 3/10 - 2014 | 2015 - 2/25, 4/6, 4/27
- Molly Andrews - 3/1, 3/15, 4/5 - 2016 | 2017 - 3/7
- Jill Rall - 3/14, 3/28 - 2017 | 2018 - 4/10
- Samantha Herman - 3/21 - 2017 | 2018 - 3/13 | 2019 - 3/5
- Erica Perrotta - 4/11 - 2017 | 2018 - 2/13, 3/20
- Christina Del Sesto - 4/18 - 2017
- Sarah Zeto - 2/12, 4/16 - 2019 | 2021 - 3/23,
- Meredith Chapman - 3/19, 4/2 - 2019 | 2020 - 2/11
- Lily Bedell - 4/19 - 2022
- Taylor Suplee - 4/26 - 2022

== Individual career records ==
Record	Amount	Player	Years
Goals	312	Abby Hormes	2018–22
Assists	134	Mackenzie Carroll	2011–14
Points	405	Abby Hormes	2018–22
Ground balls	193	Jasmine Jordan	2011–14
Draw controls	333	Abby Hormes	2018–22
Caused turnovers	129	Erica Perrotta	2015–18
Saves	299	Julia Burns	2012–15
Save %	.462	Sarah Zeto	2018–22
GAA	7.96	Lauren Hayes	2011–12

== Individual single-season records ==
Record	Amount	Player	Year
Goals	103	Abby Hormes	2022
Assists	50	Brooke Stevens	2018
Points	124	Abby Hormes	2022
Ground balls	58	Abby Hormes Taylor Suplee	2022
Draw controls	124	Abby Hormes	2022
Caused turnovers	53	Meredith Chapman	2019
Saves	156	Taylor Suplee	2022
Save %	.469	Molly Andrews	2016
GAA	8.05	Julia Burns	2014

== Seasons ==
Statistics overview
Season	Coach	Overall	Conference	Standing	Postseason
NCAA Division I (National Lacrosse Conference) (2011–2012)
2011	Lyndsey Boswell	15-4	6-1	2nd	
2012		15-4	7-0	1st	
NCAA Division I (Big South Conference) (2013–present)
2013	Lyndsey Boswell	10-9	6-1	2nd	NCAA First Round
2014	Lyndsey Boswell	14-6	7-0	1st	NCAA First Round
2015	Lyndsey Boswell	8-10	5-2	T-2nd	
2016	Lyndsey Boswell	13-6	7-1	2nd	
2017	Lyndsey Boswell	16-4	7-0	1st	NCAA Second Round
2018	Lyndsey Boswell	17-3	7-0	1st	NCAA First Round
2019	Lyndsey Boswell	15-5	6-0	1st	NCAA First Round
2020	Lyndsey Boswell	1-4	0-0		
2021	Lyndsey Boswell	10-8	6-0	1st	NCAA First Round
2022	Lyndsey Boswell	10-9	8-1	T-1st	
Total:		144-72 (.667)			
National champion Postseason invitational champion Conference regular season champion Conference regular season and conference tournament champion Division regular season champion Division regular season and conference tournament champion Conference tournament champion

== Postseason results ==
The Panthers have appeared in six NCAA Division I Women's Lacrosse Championship tournaments. Their record is 1–6.

Year	Seed	Round	Opponent	Score
2013	--	First Round	Loyola (MD)	L, 7–18
2014	--	First Round	#8 Notre Dame	L, 4–18
2017	--	First Round; Second Round	Towson #1 Maryland	W, 21–15; L, 6-21
2018	--	First Round	Denver	L, 10–19
2019	--	First Round	Navy	L, 5–16
2021	--	First Round	Maryland	L, 6–17
