= Notre Dame Fighting Irish women's lacrosse =

- Founded: 1997; 29 years ago
- University: University of Notre Dame
- Athletic director: Pete Bevacqua
- Head coach: Christine Halfpenny (since 2012 season)
- Stadium: Arlotta Family Lacrosse Stadium (capacity: 2500)
- Location: Notre Dame, Indiana
- Conference: Atlantic Coast Conference
- Nickname: Fighting Irish
- Colors: Blue and gold

NCAA Tournament Final Fours
- 2006

NCAA Tournament Quarterfinals
- 2002, 2006, 2009, 2016, 2021, 2023

NCAA Tournament appearances
- 2002, 2004, 2006, 2008, 2009, 2010, 2012, 2013, 2014, 2015, 2016, 2017, 2019, 2021, 2022, 2023, 2024, 2026

Conference Tournament championships
- 2009

The Notre Dame Fighting Irish women's lacrosse team is an NCAA Division I college lacrosse team representing the University of Notre Dame as part of the Atlantic Coast Conference. They play their home games at Arlotta Family Lacrosse Stadium in Notre Dame, Indiana.

== Individual career records ==
Record	Amount	Player	Years
Goals	262	Jillian Byers	2006–09
Assists	153	Jackie Wolak	2020–24
Points	341	Jackie Wolak	2020–24
Ground balls	193	Kathryn Lam	1999–02
Draw controls	388	Kelly Denes	2020–24
Caused turnovers	159	Barbara Sullivan	2012–16
Saves	605	Samantha Giacolone	2016–19
Save %	.531	Tara Durkin	2000–01
GAA	8.79	Jen White	2000–03

== Individual single-season records ==
Record	Amount	Player	Years
Goals	83	Jillian Byers	2009
Assists	59	Maggie Tamasitis	2012
Points	114	Crysti Foote	2006
Ground balls	64	Margaret Smith	2014
Draw controls	152	Andie Aldave	2019
Caused turnovers	55	Barbara Sullivan	2016
Saves	180	Samantha Giacolone	2017
Save %	.548	Tara Durkin	2000
GAA	7.49	Jen White	2002

== Seasons ==
Record table
Season	Coach	Overall	Conference	Standing	Postseason
NCAA Division I (Independent) (1997–2000)
1997	Tracy Coyne	5–4			
1998	Tracy Coyne	7–6			
1999	Tracy Coyne	9–6			
2000	Tracy Coyne	5–10			
NCAA Division I (Big East Conference) (2001–2013)
2001	Tracy Coyne	10–5	4–2	3rd	
2002	Tracy Coyne	13–5	5–1	2nd	NCAA Quarterfinal
2003	Tracy Coyne	8–7	4–2	3rd	
2004	Tracy Coyne	12–5	4–2	T-2nd	NCAA First Round
2005	Tracy Coyne	3–12	1–4	T-4th	
2006	Tracy Coyne	15–4	4–1	2nd	NCAA Semifinal
2007	Tracy Coyne	11–6	3–2	T-3rd	
2008	Tracy Coyne	12–7	4–1	2nd	NCAA First Round
2009	Tracy Coyne	16–5	5–2	3rd	NCAA Quarterfinal
2010	Tracy Coyne	11–7	6–2	T-2nd	NCAA First Round
2011	Tracy Coyne	10–9	6–2	T-3rd	
2012	Christine Halfpenny	13–5	6–2	3rd	NCAA First Round
2013	Christine Halfpenny	12–5	5–3	T-4th	NCAA First Round
NCAA Division I (Atlantic Coast Conference) (2014–present)
2014	Christine Halfpenny	10–9	2–5	7th	NCAA Second Round
2015	Christine Halfpenny	11–9	3–4	T-5th	NCAA Second Round
2016	Christine Halfpenny	14–7	4–3	T-3rd	NCAA Quarterfinal
2017	Christine Halfpenny	11–8	4–3	T-3rd	NCAA First Round
2018	Christine Halfpenny	10–9	3–4	5th	
2019	Christine Halfpenny	14–5	5–2	4th	NCAA Second Round
2020	Christine Halfpenny	7–0	2–0		Cancelled due to COVID-19 pandemic
2021	Christine Halfpenny	11–7	5–5	4th	NCAA Quarterfinal
2022	Christine Halfpenny	9–10	3–5	5th	NCAA First Round
2023	Christine Halfpenny	15–6	6–3	T-4th	NCAA Quarterfinal
2024	Christine Halfpenny	16–4	6–3	T-2nd	NCAA Second Round
2025	Christine Halfpenny	7–8	2–7	9th	
2026	Christine Halfpenny	12–6	6–4	T-4th	NCAA First Round
Total:		319–196 (.619)			
National champion Postseason invitational champion Conference regular season champion Conference regular season and conference tournament champion Division regular season champion Division regular season and conference tournament champion Conference tournament champion

== Postseason Results ==
The Fighting Irish have appeared in 18 NCAA tournaments. Their postseason record is 13–18.

Year	Seed	Round	Opponent	Score
2002	#7	First Round; Quarterfinal	Ohio State #2 Princeton	W, 11–7; L, 5–11
2004	#9	First Round	Northwestern	L, 8–10
2006	#6	First Round; Quarterfinal; Semifinal	Cornell #3 Georgetown #7 Dartmouth	W, 16–8; W, 12–9; L, 8–14
2008	#10	First Round	#1 Northwestern	L, 7–15
2009	#6	First Round; Quarterfinal	Vanderbilt #3 North Carolina	W, 19–13; L, 10–16
2010	#14	First Round	#2 Northwestern	L, 7–19
2012	#8	First Round	#2 Northwestern	L, 7–12
2013	#9	First Round	Stanford	L, 7–8
2014	#8	First Round; Second Round	High Point; Duke	W, 18–4; L, 8–10
2015	#12	First Round; Second Round	Ohio State #8 Northwestern	W, 13–11; L, 11–16
2016	#6	Second Round; Quarterfinal	Northwestern #3 North Carolina	W, 15–3; L, 6–10
2017	--	First Round	Cornell	L, 7–12
2019	#7	First Round; Second Round	Stanford #4 Northwestern	W, 15–9; L, 13–10
2021	#5	First Round; Second Round; Quarterfinal	Robert Morris; Virginia #4 Boston College	W, 16–0; W, 13–8; L, 10–21
2022	--	First Round	Michigan	L, 16–17
2023	#5	First Round; Second Round; Quarterfinal	Mercer #6 Florida #3 Boston College	W, 21–6; W, 16–15; L, 6–20
2024	#7	First Round; Second Round	Coastal Carolina; Michigan	W, 24–6; L, 14–15
2026	--	First Round	James Madison	L, 12–13
