= Towson Tigers women's lacrosse =

- Founded: 1977
- University: Towson University
- Head coach: Sonia LaMonica (since 2011 season)
- Stadium: Johnny Unitas Stadium (capacity: 11,200)
- Location: Towson, Maryland
- Conference: Coastal Athletic Association
- Nickname: Tigers
- Colors: Black and gold

NCAA Tournament appearances
- 2005, 2008, 2009, 2010, 2012, 2013, 2014, 2016, 2017, 2018, 2021

Conference Tournament championships
- 1990, 1991, 1992, 2005, 2008, 2009, 2012, 2013, 2014, 2016

Conference regular season championships
- 1991, 1992, 1997, 2008, 2011, 2012, 2013, 2014, 2016

The Towson Tigers women's lacrosse team is an NCAA Division I college lacrosse team representing Towson University as member of the Coastal Athletic Association. The team plays home games at Johnny Unitas Stadium in Towson, Maryland.

== Seasons ==
Statistics overview
Season	Coach	Overall	Conference	Standing	Postseason
AIAW Division II (1977–1982)
1977	Maggie Faulkner	6-8-1			
1978		6-7-1			
1979		8-8			
1980		13-6			
1981		10-7			
1982	Linda DiColo	10-7			
NCAA Division I (East Coast Conference) (1983–1992)
1983	Maggie Faulkner	8-10-1	1-2	4th	
1984		11-8-1	2-4	5th	
1985		9-8	3-3	4th	
1986	Lisa Pierce	3-12	3-3	4th	
1987	Sandy Hoody	5-9	3-3	4th	
1988		5-10	3-3	4th	
1989		6-9	3-3	4th	
1990		11-4	4-2	4th	
1991	Alison Williams	9-6	4-0	1st	
1992		10-6	2-0	1st	
NCAA Division I (Independent) (1993–1995)
1993	Charlotte Hennan	7-7			
1994		2-11			
1995	Ashley Duncan	5-8			
NCAA Division I (America East Conference) (1996–2001)
1996		7-10	3-2	3rd	
1997		11-6	6-0	1st	
1998		8-9	4-2	4th	
1999	Linda Ohrin	4-12	3-3	4th	
2000		6-9	2-4	5th	
2001		6-9	2-4	5th	
NCAA Division I (Colonial Athletic Association) (2002–present)
2002		7-9	3-5	T-7th	
2003		7-9	1-6	7th	
2004	Missy Doherty	14-4	6-1	2nd	
2005		13-6	5-2	2nd	NCAA First Round
2006		7-10	4-3	4th	
2007		6-9	3-4	T-5th	
2008		13-6	5-2	T-1st	NCAA First Round
2009		13-6	5-2	T-2nd	NCAA First Round
2010		13-5	5-2	2nd	NCAA First Round
2011	Sonia LaMonica	11-7	6-1	T-1st	
2012		16-4	7-0	1st	NCAA First Round
2013		10-9	6-1	T-1st	NCAA First Round
2014		11-8	4-1	T-1st	NCAA First Round
2015		9-9	3-3	4th	
2016		16-4	5-1	T-1st	NCAA Second Round
2017		12-7	4-2	T-2nd	NCAA First Round
2018		16-5	5-1	2nd	NCAA Second Round
Total:		369-324-4 (.532)			
National champion Postseason invitational champion Conference regular season champion Conference regular season and conference tournament champion Division regular season champion Division regular season and conference tournament champion Conference tournament champion

== Postseason results ==
The Tigers have appeared in 11 NCAA tournaments. Their postseason record is 2-11.

Year	Seed	Round	Opponent	Score
2005	--	First Round	#5 Georgetown	L, 14-15
2008	--	First Round	#5 Syracuse	L, 9-21
2009	--	First Round	#3 North Carolina	L, 4-15
2010	--	First Round	#6 Virginia	L, 12-14
2012	#8	First Round	Penn State	L, 8-15
2013	--	First Round	Stony Brook	L, 6-8
2014	--	First Round	Stony Brook	L, 8-10
2016	--	First Round; Second Round	Old Dominion #7 Penn	W, 16-5; L, 4-12
2017	--	First Round	High Point	L, 15-21
2018	#7	First Round; Second Round	Wagner; Northwestern	W, 16-6; L, 17-21
2021	--	First Round	Stony Brook	L, 8-14

== Individual career records ==
Record	Amount	Player	Years
Goals	208	Ruth Gutridge	1983-86
Assists	91	Ashley Rohrback	2010-14
Points	267	Ruth Gutridge	1983-86
Ground balls	181	Melissa Garner	2000-03
Draw controls	327	Hillary Fratzke	2006-10
Caused turnovers	144	Hillary Fratzke	2006-10
Saves	912	Jacquie Sica	1997-00
Save %	.597	Colleen Cahill	1987-90

== Individual single-season records ==
Record	Amount	Player	Year
Goals	71	Shannon Witzel	2005
Assists	43	Meggie McNamara	2009
Points	87	Ruth Gutridge	1984
Ground balls	65	Robyn Harry	1998
Draw controls	107	Hillary Fratzke	2006
Caused turnovers	47	Hillary Fratzke	2008
Saves	360	Mary Bartel	1980
Save %	.739	Mary Bartel	1979
