= Boston College Eagles women's lacrosse =

College lacrosse team

- Founded: 1992
- University: Boston College
- Head coach: Acacia Walker (14th season)
- Stadium: Alumni Stadium; Newton Soccer Complex; Fish Field House (closed to public)
- Location: Chestnut Hill, Massachusetts
- Conference: Atlantic Coast Conference
- Nickname: Eagles
- Colors: Maroon and gold

NCAA Tournament championships
- 2021, 2024

NCAA Tournament Runner-Up
- 2017, 2018, 2019, 2022, 2023

NCAA Tournament Final Fours
- 2017, 2018, 2019, 2021, 2022, 2023, 2024, 2025

NCAA Tournament appearances
- 2011, 2013, 2014, 2015, 2016, 2017, 2018, 2019, 2021, 2022, 2023, 2024, 2025, 2026

Conference Tournament championships
- 2023, 2024

Conference regular season championships
- 2018, 2019, 2023

The Boston College Eagles women's lacrosse team is an NCAA Division I college lacrosse team representing Boston College as part of the Atlantic Coast Conference. They play their home games at Newton Soccer Complex in Newton, Massachusetts and at Alumni Stadium in Chestnut Hill, Massachusetts.

== Individual career records ==
Record	Number	Player	Years
Goals	278	Sam Apuzzo	2016-2019
Assists	220	Mckenna Davis	2022-2025
Points	390	Sam Apuzzo	2016–2019
Ground balls	201	Jacklyn Yovankin	2002-2005
Draw controls	444	Sam Apuzzo	2016-2019
Saves	982	Megan McElvogue	1994-1997

== Individual single-season records ==
Record	Number	Player	Year
Goals	106	Rachel Clark	2025
Assists	77	Mckenna Davis	2025
Points	129	Sam Apuzzo	2018
Ground balls	89	Jacklyn Yovankin	2003
Draw controls	191	Sam Apuzzo	2019
Saves	289	Megan McElvogue	1997
Save %	.695	Megan McElvogue	1995

== Seasons ==
Record table
Season	Coach	Overall	Conference	Standing	Postseason
NCAA Division I (Independent) (1992–2000)
1992	Sherren Granese	5-7			
1993		5-9			
1994		8-7			
1995		5-8			
1996	Mary Ann Foley	8-7			
1997		5-11			
1998		5-10			
1999		4-11			
2000		6-10			
NCAA Division I (Big East Conference) (2001–2005)
2001	Shari Krasnoo	6-9	1-5	6th	
2002		8-9	1-5	6th (tied)	
2003		9-6	2-4	5th	
2004		6-11	0-6	7th	
2005		10-7	1-4	4th (tied)	
NCAA Division I (Atlantic Coast Conference) (2006–present)
2006	Bowen Holden	8-9	1-4	5th	
2007		6-11	1-4	5th	
2008		7-10	2-3	4th (tied)	
2009		9-9	0-5	6th	
2010		12-6	1-4	5th	
2011		12-7	1-4	4th (tied)	NCAA First Round
2012		10-8	1-4	5th (tied)	
2013	Acacia Walker	12-8	3-2	3rd	NCAA First Round
2014		15-6	3-4	4th (tied)	NCAA Quarterfinal
2015		15-4	5-2	2nd (tied)	NCAA Second Round
2016		10-9	2-5	7th	NCAA First Round
2017		17-7	3-4	5th (tied)	NCAA Runner-Up
2018		22-2	7-0	1st	NCAA Runner-Up
2019		22-2	7-0	1st	NCAA Runner-Up
2020		4-3	0-1		COVID Year
2021		18-3	8-2	2nd (tied)	NCAA champion
2022		19-4	6-2	2nd	NCAA Runner-up
2023		19-4	8-1	1st (tied)	NCAA Runner-up
2024		20-3	7-2	2nd	NCAA champion
2025		19-3	8-1	2nd	NCAA Semifinal
2026		10-8	6-4	7th	NCAA Second Round
Total:		377-248 (.603)			
National champion Postseason invitational champion Conference regular season champion Conference regular season and conference tournament champion Division regular season champion Division regular season and conference tournament champion Conference tournament champion

== Postseason Results ==
The Eagles have appeared in 14 NCAA tournaments. Their postseason record is 28–11.

Year	Seed	Round	Opponent	Score
2011	--	First Round	#2 Northwestern	L, 8-11
2013	--	First Round	Dartmouth	L, 8-11
2014	#7	First Round; Second Round; Quarterfinal	Bryant; Loyola (MD) #2 Syracuse	W, 17-9; W, 8-3; L, 9-11
2015	#5	Second Round	Loyola (MD)	L, 12-19
2016	--	First Round	Stony Brook	L, 9-11
2017	--	First Round; Second Round; Quarterfinal; Semifinal; Final	Canisius #6 Syracuse; USC; Navy #1 Maryland	W, 21-9; W, 21-10; W, 20-14; W, 16-15; L, 13-16
2018	#4	Second Round; Quarterfinal; Semifinal; Final	Princeton #5 Stony Brook #1 Maryland #3 James Madison	W, 16–10; W, 12–11 (2ot); W, 15–13; L, 15–16
2019	#2	Second Round; Quarterfinal; Semifinal; Final	Colorado #7 Princeton #3 North Carolina #1 Maryland	W, 21–9; W, 17–12; W, 15–14 (2ot); L, 10–12
2021	#4	First Round; Second Round; Quarterfinal; Semifinal; Final	Fairfield; Temple #5 Notre Dame #1 North Carolina #3 Syracuse	W, 19–6; W, 21–11; W, 21–10; W, 11–10; W, 16–10
2022	#3	Second Round; Quarterfinal; Semifinal; Final	Denver #6 Loyola (MD) #2 Maryland #1 North Carolina	W, 13–8; W, 20–13; W, 17–16; L, 11–12
2023	#3	Second Round; Quarterfinal; Semifinal; Final	Penn; Notre Dame #2 Syracuse #1 Northwestern	W, 9–7; W, 20–6; W, 8–7; L, 6–18
2024	#2	Second Round; Quarterfinal; Semifinal; Final	Princeton; Michigan #3 Syracuse #1 Northwestern	W, 21-16; W, 14-9; W, 10–7; W, 14-13
2025	#2	Second Round; Quarterfinal; Semifinal	Stony Brook #7 Yale #3 Northwestern	W, 10-7; W, 18-11; L, 11-12
2026	--	First Round; Second Round	Yale #5 Stony Brook	W, 10-4; L, 9-10
