= USC Trojans women's lacrosse =

- Founded: 2013
- University: University of Southern California
- Head coach: Lindsey Munday (since 2013 season)
- Stadium: McAlister Field (capacity: 1000)
- Location: Los Angeles, California
- Conference: Big Ten Conference
- Nickname: Trojans
- Colors: Cardinal and gold

NCAA Tournament appearances
- 2015, 2016, 2017, 2019, 2022, 2023

Conference Tournament championships
- 2016, 2017, 2019, 2023

Conference regular season championships
- 2016, 2017, 2019, 2023

The USC Trojans women's lacrosse team is an NCAA Division I college lacrosse team representing the University of Southern California as part of the Big Ten Conference. They play their home games at McAlister Field in Los Angeles, California.

== Seasons ==
Record table
Season	Coach	Overall	Conference	Standing	Postseason
MPSF (2013–2017)
2013	Lindsey Munday	8–10	3–5	4th	
2014		9–9	6–3	T-3rd	
2015		14–6	8–1	2nd	NCAA Second Round
2016		20–1	9–0	1st	NCAA Quarterfinal
2017		18–4	8–0	1st	NCAA Quarterfinal
Pac-12 Conference (2018–2024)
2018		10–8	6–4	3rd	
2019		16-4	9-1	1st	NCAA First Round
2020		6-0	2-0	†	†
2021		9-7	6-3	2nd	
2022		13-5	8-2	T-1st	NCAA First Round
2023		16-4	9-1	1st	NCAA First Round
2024		12-5	6-1	2nd	
Big 10 Conference (2025–Present)
2025		10-7	3-5	6th	
2026		8-9	1-7	8th	
Total:		159–72 (.688)			
National champion Postseason invitational champion Conference regular season champion Conference regular season and conference tournament champion Division regular season champion Division regular season and conference tournament champion Conference tournament champion

== Postseason results ==
The Trojans have appeared in 3 NCAA tournaments. Their postseason record is 4–3.

Year	Seed	Round	Opponent	Score
2015	–	First Round; Second Round	James Madison #3 Duke	W, 13–10; L, 9–17
2016	No. 5	Second Round; Quarterfinal	Stanford #4 Syracuse	W, 14–8; L, 11–12 (OT)
2017	–	First Round; Second Round; Quarterfinal	Jacksonville #3 Florida; Boston College	W, 13–10; W, 15–12; L, 14–20
2019	–	First Round	Denver	L, 10–11 (OT)
2022	–	First Round	Virginia	L, 11–13

== Individual career records ==
Record	Amount	Player	Years
Goals	234	Michaela Michael	2014–17
Assists	122	Caroline DeLyra	2013–16
Points	305	Michaela Michael	2014–17
Ground balls	194	Gussie Johns	2015–
Draw controls	422	Michaela Michael	2014–17
Caused turnovers	125	Courtney Tarleton	2013–16
Saves	343	Gussie Johns	2015–
Save %	.439	Gussie Johns	2015–
GAA	7.76	Gussie Johns	2015–

== Individual single-season records ==
Record	Amount	Player	Year
Goals	78	Michaela Michael	2017
Assists	42	Caroline DeLyra	2013
Points	99	Michaela Michael	2016; 2017
Ground balls	98	Gussie Johns	2017
Draw controls	149	Maddie McDaniel	2021
Caused turnovers	52	Courtney Tarleton	2016
Saves	151	Riley Hertford	2019
Save %	.469	Gussie Johns	2016
GAA	6.04	Gussie Johns	2016
