= Syracuse Orange women's lacrosse =

NCAA women's college lacrosse team

- Founded: 1998; 28 years ago
- University: Syracuse University
- Head coach: Regy Thorpe (1st season)
- Stadium: JMA Wireless Dome (capacity: 49,250)
- Location: Syracuse, New York
- Conference: Atlantic Coast Conference
- Nickname: Orange
- Colors: Orange

NCAA Tournament Runner-Up
- 2012, 2014, 2021

NCAA Tournament Final Fours
- 2008, 2010, 2012, 2013, 2014, 2015, 2016, 2021, 2023, 2024

NCAA Tournament appearances
- 2000, 2001, 2002, 2003, 2005, 2007, 2008, 2009, 2010, 2012, 2013, 2014, 2015, 2016, 2017, 2018, 2019, 2021, 2022, 2023, 2024, 2025, 2026

Conference Tournament championships
- 2007, 2008, 2013, 2015

Conference regular season championships
- 2007, 2008, 2009, 2011, 2012, 2013, 2014, 2023, 2024

The Syracuse Orange women's lacrosse is an NCAA Division I college lacrosse team representing Syracuse University as part of the Atlantic Coast Conference. They play their home games at the JMA Wireless Dome in Syracuse, New York.

== History ==
The Syracuse Orange women's lacrosse program was established in 1997–98 with Lisa Miller as the first head coach.

=== Historical statistics ===
Overall
Years of Lacrosse	28
1st Season	1998
Head Coaches	4
All-Time Record	393–158
Big East games
Big East season W-L record (2001–13)	67–16
Big East Titles	6
Big East Tournament Titles	3
ACC games
ACC season W-L record (2014–)	68–30
ACC Titles	3
ACC Tournament Titles	1
NCAA Tournament
NCAA Appearances	23
NCAA W-L record	30–23
Final Fours	9
Championship Games	3
NCAA National Championships	0

*Statistics through 2026 season

== Individual career records ==
Record	Amount	Player	Years
Goals	272	Emily Hawryschuk	2017–22
Assists	169	Emma Ward	2021–25
Points	415	Meaghan Tyrrell	2019–23
Ground balls	206	Asa Goldstock	2017–21
Draw controls	493	Kate Mashewske	2020–24
Caused turnovers	110	Coco Vandiver	2022–26
Saves	663	Asa Goldstock	2017–21
Save %	.552	Clothilde Ewing	1998–00
GAA	7.95	Clothilde Ewing	1998–00

== Individual single-season records ==
Record	Amount	Player	Years
Goals	79	Kayla Treanor	2014
Assists	69	Katie Rowan	2008
Points	142	Katie Rowan	2008
Ground balls	78	Delaney Sweitzer	2023
Draw controls	234	Kate Mashewske	2024
Caused turnovers	57	Izzy Lahah	2026
Saves	211	Liz Hogan	2010
Save %	.585	Clothilde Ewing	1999
GAA	6.61	Clothilde Ewing	1998

== Seasons ==
Record table
Season	Coach	Overall	Conference	Standing	Postseason
NCAA Division I (Independent) (1998–2000)
1998	Lisa Miller	9–4			
1999	Lisa Miller	12–4			
2000	Lisa Miller	12–4			NCAA First Round
NCAA Division I (Big East Conference) (2001–2013)
2001	Lisa Miller	10–5	5–1	2nd	NCAA First Round
2002	Lisa Miller	10–6	3–3	T-3rd	NCAA First Round
2003	Lisa Miller	10–6	5–1	2nd	NCAA First Round
2004	Lisa Miller	9–6	4–2	T-2nd	
2005	Lisa Miller	12–5	4–1	2nd	NCAA First Round
2006	Lisa Miller	9–7	2–3	4th	
2007	Lisa Miller	13–6	4–1	T-1st	NCAA Quarterfinal
2008	Gary Gait	18–3	5–0	1st	NCAA Semifinal
2009	Gary Gait	14–5	6–1	T-1st	NCAA Quarterfinal
2010	Gary Gait	15–7	6–2	T-2nd	NCAA Semifinal
2011	Gary Gait	10–8	7–1	T-1st	
2012	Gary Gait	19–4	8–0	1st	NCAA Runner-up
2013	Gary Gait	18–4	8–0	1st	NCAA Semifinal
NCAA Division I (Atlantic Coast Conference) (2014–present)
2014	Gary Gait	21–3	6–1	T-1st	NCAA Runner-up
2015	Gary Gait	16–8	3–4	T-5th	NCAA Semifinal
2016	Gary Gait	19–6	5–2	2nd	NCAA Semifinal
2017	Gary Gait	15–7	5–2	2nd	NCAA Second Round
2018	Gary Gait	9–10	1–6	7th	NCAA First Round
2019	Gary Gait	16–5	5–2	T-2nd	NCAA Quarterfinal
2020	Gary Gait	7–1	1–0		Event cancelled
2021	Gary Gait	17–4	8–2	T-2nd	NCAA Runner-up
2022	Kayla Treanor	15–6	6–2	T-2nd	NCAA Quarterfinal
2023	Kayla Treanor	18–3	8–1	T-1st	NCAA Semifinal
2024	Kayla Treanor	16–6	8–1	1st	NCAA Semifinal
2025	Kayla Treanor	10–9	5–4	T-6th	NCAA Second Round
2026	Regy Thorpe	14–6	7–3	T-3rd	NCAA Second Round
Total:		393–158 (.713)			
National champion Postseason invitational champion Conference regular season champion Conference regular season and conference tournament champion Division regular season champion Division regular season and conference tournament champion Conference tournament champion

== Postseason Results ==
The Orange have appeared in 23 NCAA tournaments. Their postseason record is 30–23.

Year	Seed	Round	Opponent	Score
2000	–	First Round	Georgetown	L, 10–11
2001	#11	First Round	#6 North Carolina	L, 9–14
2002	–	First Round	#4 Cornell	L, 8–16
2003	–	First Round	Yale	L, 7–12
2005	–	First Round	#4 Dartmouth	L, 8–9
2007	–	First Round; Quarterfinal	#8 Vanderbilt #1 Northwestern	W, 16–10; L, 9–14
2008	#5	First Round; Quarterfinal; Semifinal	Towson; North Carolina #1 Northwestern	W, 21–9; W, 13–11; L, 8–16
2009	#7	First Round; Quarterfinal	Boston U. #2 Maryland	W, 20–10; L, 10–12
2010	–	First Round; Quarterfinal; Semifinal	#4 Georgetown #5 James Madison #1 Maryland	W, 15–8; W, 7–3; L, 5–14
2012	#4	First Round; Quarterfinal; Semifinal; Final	Dartmouth #5 North Carolina #1 Florida #2 Northwestern	W, 15–5; W, 17–16; W, 14–13 (2OT); L, 6–8
2013	#4	Second Round; Quarterfinal; Semifinal	Dartmouth #5 Florida #1 Maryland	W, 21–8; W, 13–9; L, 10–11
2014	#2	Second Round; Quarterfinal; Semifinal; Final	Stony Brook #7 Boston College #6 Virginia #1 Maryland	W, 13–6; W, 11–9; W, 16–8; L, 12–15
2015	#4	Second Round; Quarterfinal; Semifinal	Penn; Loyola (MD) #1 Maryland	W, 13–10; W, 10–7; L, 8–10
2016	#4	Second Round; Quarterfinal; Semifinal	Stony Brook #5 Southern Cal #1 Maryland	W, 7–6; W, 12–11 (OT); L, 9–19
2017	#6	Second Round	Boston College	L, 10–21
2018	–	First Round	Princeton	L, 11–12 (2OT)
2019	#5	Second Round; Quarterfinal	Georgetown #4 Northwestern	W, 14–8; L, 14–18
2021	#3	Second Round; Quarterfinal; Semifinal; Final	Loyola Maryland #6 Florida #2 Northwestern #4 Boston College	W, 20–8; W, 17–11; W, 21–13; L, 10–16
2022	#5	First Round; Second Round; Quarterfinal	Fairfield; Princeton #4 Northwestern	W, 12–11; W, 13–9; L, 4–15
2023	#2	Second Round; Quarterfinal; Semifinal	Johns Hopkins #7 James Madison #3 Boston College	W, 25–8; W, 13–7; L, 7–8
2024	#3	Second Round; Quarterfinal; Semifinal	Stony Brook #6 Yale #2 Boston College	W, 15–10; W, 19–9; L, 7–10
2025	–	First Round; Second Round	Brown #7 Yale	W, 15–9; L, 8–9
2026	–	First Round; Second Round	Loyola (MD) #6 Navy	W, 8–6; L, 10–11
