= 2016 NCAA Division I women's lacrosse tournament =

- Dates: May 13–29, 2016
- Teams: 26
- Finals site: Talen Energy Stadium, Chester, PA
- Champions: North Carolina (2nd title)
- Runner-up: Maryland (19th title game)
- Semifinalists: Syracuse (11th Final Four); Penn State (11th Final Four)
- Winning coach: Jenny Levy (2nd title)
- MOP: Aly Messinger, North Carolina
- Attendance: 7,636 finals

The 2016 NCAA Division I Women's Lacrosse Championship was the 35th annual single-elimination tournament to determine the national champion of Division I NCAA women's college lacrosse. The semifinal and championship rounds were played at Talen Energy Stadium (the home of Major League Soccer's Philadelphia Union) in Chester, Pennsylvania from May 27–29, 2016. All other rounds were played at campus sites, usually at the home field of the higher-seeded team, from May 13–22.

== Tournament field ==
All NCAA Division I women's lacrosse programs were eligible for this championship, and a total of 26 teams were invited to participate. 13 teams qualified automatically by winning their conference tournaments while the remaining 13 teams qualified at-large based on their regular season records.

=== Teams ===
Seed	School	Conference	Berth type	RPI	Record
1	Maryland	Big Ten	Automatic	1	19–0
2	Florida	Big East	Automatic	3	18–1
3	North Carolina	ACC	Automatic	2	16–2
4	Syracuse	ACC	At-large	4	17–5
5	USC	MPSF	Automatic	6	19–0
6	Notre Dame	ACC	At-large	7	13–6
7	Penn	Ivy	At-large	8	13–4
8	Cornell	Ivy	Automatic	12	13–4
	Boston College	ACC	At-large	20	10–8
	Canisus	MAAC	Automatic	33	13–6
	Duke	ACC	At-large	18	10–8
	James Madison	CAA	At-large	22	10–9
	Johns Hopkins	Independent	At-large	24	10–7
	Louisville	ACC	At-large	16	12–5
	Loyola (MD)	Patriot	Automatic	14	14–5
	Massachusetts	Atlantic 10	Automatic	19	18–1
	Northwestern	Big Ten	At-large	10	10–9
	Old Dominion	Atlantic Sun	Automatic	35	16–3
	Penn State	Big Ten	At-large	15	11–6
	Princeton	Ivy	At-large	9	11–5
	Stanford	MPSF	At-large	13	14–4
	Stony Brook	America East	Automatic	11	16–3
	Towson	CAA	Automatic	5	15–3
	Virginia	ACC	At-large	17	9–8
	Wagner	NEC	Automatic	58	10–8
	Winthrop	Big South	Automatic	25	20–2

== Bracket ==
First Round; May 13; Regional Campus Sites
Virginia	10
Johns Hopkins	12
Princeton	12
Massachusetts	13
Canisius	11
8	Cornell*	15
Stanford	9
James Madison	8
Stony Brook	11
Boston College	9
Loyola (MD)	8
Duke	14
Northwestern	15
Louisville	5
7	Penn*	17
Wagner	7
Towson	16
Old Dominion	5
Penn State	16
Winthrop	6

Second Round; May 15; Regional Campus Sites
1	Maryland*	14
Johns Hopkins	8
Massachusetts	7
8	Cornell	6
5	USC*	14
Stanford	8
Stony Brook	6
4	Syracuse*	7
3	North Carolina*	15
Duke	10
Northwestern	3
6	Notre Dame*	15
7	Penn	12
Towson	4
Penn State	14
2	Florida*	13

Quarterfinals; May 21–22; Campus Sites
1	Maryland	18
Massachusetts	3
5	USC	11
4	Syracuse	12
3	North Carolina	10
6	Notre Dame	6
7	Penn	4
Penn State	8

Semifinals; May 27; Talen Energy Stadium
1	Maryland	19
4	Syracuse	9
3	North Carolina	12
Penn state	11

Final; May 29; Talen Energy Stadium
1	Maryland	7
3	North Carolina	13

== See also ==
- NCAA Division II Women's Lacrosse Championship
- NCAA Division III Women's Lacrosse Championship
- 2016 NCAA Division I Men's Lacrosse Championship
