= Mid-American Conference women's lacrosse tournament =

Women's lacrosse championship

- Conference women's lacrosse championship
- Sport: Lacrosse
- Conference: Mid-American Conference
- Number of teams: 4
- Played: 2022–present
- Last contest: 2025
- Current champion: Akron (1)
- Most championships: Central Michigan (2)
- Official website: getsomemaction.com/tournaments/?id=202

Host locations
- Campus sites (2022–present)

The Mid-American Conference women's lacrosse tournament is the conference women's lacrosse championship of the Mid-American Conference, a Division I member of the National Collegiate Athletic Association (NCAA). The top four finishers participate in the single elimination tournament, which is held at the home field of the top seed. The winner of the tournament receives an automatic berth to the NCAA Division I Women's Lacrosse Championship.

The tournament began in 2022, the season after the conference added women's lacrosse as a sponsored sport. Through the 2025 tournament, Central Michigan has won the most tournaments with two titles.

== History ==
The Mid-American Conference announced in late 2019 that women's lacrosse would be added as a sponsored sport for the 2021 season. At that time of the announcement, only two full members of the conference had women's lacrosse teams, with Central Michigan starting play in 2016 and Kent State in 2019. Akron had started scrimmaging in September 2019 and began formal competition the following February, while Eastern Michigan had announced plans in November 2019 to have a team by 2022. As part of the MAC's announcement, two affiliate members were also introduced: Detroit Mercy and Youngstown State, both full members of the Horizon League. Later, in June 2020, the conference announced that Robert Morris, who was also in the process of becoming a full member of the Horizon League, would join as an affiliate for the inaugural 2021 season, for a total of six teams. Eastern Michigan began formal competition in 2023 to bring the total to seven.

Initial plans called for the tournament to begin in 2021, but in May 2020, the conference announced that the women's lacrosse tournament, along with seven other conference tournaments, would be eliminated for at least four years as a result of the financial implications of the COVID-19 pandemic. The following May, however, the conference reversed the decision, restoring the tournaments for all eight sports effective for the 2021–22 season. Robert Morris won the inaugural regular-season title, but no tournament was held, so the Colonials won the automatic bid to the 2021 NCAA Division I Women's Lacrosse Championship. The first tournament was held in 2022, with Central Michigan, Robert Morris, Kent State, and Youngstown State qualifying. The tournament was hosted and won by regular-season champion Central Michigan.

== Champions ==
=== By year ===
The following is a list of tournament champions, runners up, and sites listed by year.

Year	Champion	Runner-up	Site
2022	Central Michigan	Robert Morris	CMU Soccer/Lacrosse Complex • Mt. Pleasant, Michigan
2023	Central Michigan	Robert Morris	Joe Walton Stadium • Moon Township, Pennsylvania
2024	Robert Morris	Detroit Mercy	CMU Soccer/Lacrosse Complex • Mt. Pleasant, Michigan
2025	Akron	Robert Morris	Joe Walton Stadium • Moon Township, Pennsylvania

=== By school ===
The following is a list of tournament champions listed by school, the years each team was eligible to play in the tournament, and their overall record in tournament play.

Program	Tenure	Titles	Title years	Tournament appearances	Record	Percentage
Central Michigan	2022–present	2	2022, 2023	3	4–1	.800
Robert Morris	2022–present	1	2024	4	5–3	.625
Akron	2022–present	1	2025	1	2–0	1.000
Detroit Mercy	2022–present	0		2	1–2	.333
Eastern Michigan	2023–present	0		2	0–2	.000
Kent State	2022–present	0		2	0–2	.000
Youngstown State	2022–present	0		2	0–2	.000
