= Janine Tucker =

American lacrosse coach

Janine Rene Tucker (née Kormanik) is an American lacrosse coach. As the head coach for the Johns Hopkins Blue Jays women's lacrosse team until her retirement in 2022, Tucker was the all-time winningest coach at Johns Hopkins.

== Early life and education ==
Tucker was born to Stephen J. Kormanik and graduated from Loch Raven High School and Loyola University Maryland. During her time at Loyola, Tucker competed in lacrosse and field hockey, where she received numerous accolades including All-America, Ernest Lagna Award, and Most Valuable Player. In 1989, she was named the university's top female athlete and later inducted into their Hall of Fame. Tucker married John Russell Tucker Jr. in November 1989. They divorced in 2017.

== Career ==
After graduation, Tucker became an assistant lacrosse coach under Diane Geppi-Aikens at Loyola for four seasons, helping the team to the 1990 national semifinals. She took over the Johns Hopkins Blue Jays women's lacrosse team in 1993 when women's sports were less respected and all of the varsity women's teams shared a single locker room. During the 1993–94 season, she successfully led the team to an unbeaten 16–0 record in her first year. By her fourth year as head coach, Tucker was named the Intercollegiate Women's Lacrosse Coaches' Association's Central Region Coach of the Year three times.

During her first few years as coach, Tucker's Blue Jays played at the NCAA Division III level, making five NCAA championship playoff appearances. In 1999, the Blue Jays were promoted to NCAA Division I, where they posted a 10–4 record including four consecutive wins. In 2001, Tucker recorded her 100th career win during a 13–9 win over George Mason University as she led the team to their first ECAC Championship as a Division I team. By 2003, Tucker tied Sally Anderson as the winningest coaches in school history with an 111–40 record over her first nine years. She was subsequently inducted into the Greater Baltimore Chapter Lacrosse Hall of Fame alongside her husband. In the same year, she also published her first book titled The Baffled Parent's Guide To Coaching Girls' Lacrosse which was aimed at parents and coaches of athletic female preteens.

By the time Tucker reached her 13th season at Johns Hopkins, she had posted a 157–60 record including an 89–43 (.674) mark at the Division I level and led the Blue Jays to four NCAA Division III Tournament appearances, four Centennial Conference titles, three ECAC Division I Championship games, and the program's first two NCAA Division I Tournament appearances in 2004 and 2005. On April 14, 2011, Tucker became the 14th coach in NCAA Division I history to reach 200 wins. During the 2014 season, Tucker helped the Blue Jays reach numerous school records including most wins and longest win streak, best winning percentage, most goals scored, most free position goals, and best goals against average. Tucker reached yet another milestone in 2016 as she became the ninth coach in NCAA Division I history to reach 250 wins. The following year, she became the all-time winningest coach at Johns Hopkins and served as the Girls' Director for its inaugural Peak Performance Camp.
