= 2017 NCAA Division I women's lacrosse tournament =

- Dates: May 12–28, 2017
- Teams: 26
- Finals site: Gillette Stadium, Foxborough, MA
- Champions: Maryland (13th title)
- Runner-up: Boston College (1st title game)
- Semifinalists: Penn State (11th Final Four); Navy (1st Final Four)
- Winning coach: Cathy Reese (4th title)
- MOP: Kenzie Kent, Boston College
- Attendance: 11,668 finals

The 2017 NCAA Division I Women's Lacrosse Championship was the 36th annual single-elimination tournament to determine the national champion of Division I NCAA women's college lacrosse. The semifinal and championship rounds were played at Gillette Stadium in Foxborough, Massachusetts from May 26–28, 2017. All other rounds were played at campus sites, usually at the home field of the higher-seeded team, from May 12–21.

== Tournament field ==
All NCAA Division I women's lacrosse programs were eligible for this championship, and a total of 26 teams were invited to participate. 13 teams qualified automatically by winning their conference tournaments, while the remaining 13 teams qualified at-large based on their regular season records.

=== Teams ===
Seed	School	Conference	Berth Type	RPI	Record
1	Maryland	Big Ten	Automatic	2	19–0
2	North Carolina	ACC	Automatic	1	16–2
3	Florida	Big East	Automatic	4	17–2
4	Penn State	Big Ten	At-large	7	15–3
5	Princeton	Ivy	Automatic	3	14–3
6	Syracuse	ACC	At-large	5	15–6
7	Penn	Ivy	At-large	8	13–3
8	Stony Brook	America East	Automatic	6	18–1
	Albany	America East	At-large	20	12–5
	Boston College	ACC	At-large	12	13–6
	Bryant	NEC	Automatic	48	13–4
	Canisius	MAAC	Automatic	32	15–4
	Colorado	MPSF	At-large	9	16–3
	Cornell	Ivy	At-large	15	12–5
	Elon	CAA	At-large	17	13–6
	High Point	Big South	Automatic	28	15–3
	Jacksonville	Atlantic Sun	Automatic	29	14–5
	James Madison	CAA	Automatic	14	13–6
	Louisville	ACC	At-large	31	11–7
	Massachusetts	Atlantic 10	Automatic	18	16–3
	Navy	Patriot	Automatic	25	15–4
	Northwestern	Big Ten	At-large	10	10–9
	Notre Dame	ACC	At-large	23	11–7
	Towson	CAA	At-large	16	12–6
	USC	MPSF	Automatic	13	16–3
	Virginia	ACC	At-large	11	11–8

== Bracket ==
First Round; May 12; Regional Campus Sites
Towson	15
High Point	21
Northwestern	15
Albany (NY)	7
Bryant	6
8	Stony Brook*	21
Cornell	12
Notre Dame	7
James Madison	12
Louisville	6
USC	13
Jacksonville	10
Boston College	21
Canisius	9
7	Penn*	10
Navy	11
Colorado	7
UMass	13
Virginia	11
Elon	9

Second Round; May 14; Regional Campus Sites
1	Maryland*	21
High Point	6
Northwestern	9
8	Stony Brook	13
5	Princeton*	11
Cornell	9
James Madison	14
4	Penn State*	19
3	Florida*	12
USC	15
Boston College	21
6	Syracuse*	10
Navy	23
UMass	11
Virginia	12
2	North Carolina*	23

Quarterfinals; May 20–21; Campus Sites
1	Maryland	13
8	Stony Brook	12
5	Princeton	12
4	Penn State	14
USC	14
Boston College	20
Navy	16
2	North Carolina	14

Semifinals; May 26; Gillette Stadium
1	Maryland	20
4	Penn State	10
Boston College	16
Navy	15

Final; May 28; Gillette Stadium
1	Maryland	16
Boston College	13

- *First and second round host.

== See also ==
- NCAA Division II Women's Lacrosse Championship
- NCAA Division III Women's Lacrosse Championship
