= 2019 NCAA Division I women's lacrosse tournament =

College lacrosse tournament

- Dates: May 7–26, 2019
- Teams: 28
- Finals site: Homewood Field, Baltimore, MD
- Champions: Maryland (14th title)
- Runner-up: Boston College (3rd title game)
- Semifinalists: Northwestern (11th Final Four); North Carolina (11th Final Four)
- Winning coach: Cathy Reese (5th title)
- MOP: Megan Taylor, Maryland

The 2019 NCAA Division I Women's Lacrosse Championship is the 38th annual single-elimination tournament to determine the national champion of Division I NCAA women's college lacrosse. The semifinal and championship rounds were played at Homewood Field in Baltimore from May 24–26, 2019. All other rounds were played at campus sites, usually at the home field of the higher-seeded team, from May 7–19. This was the last NCAA tournament played until the 2021 edition after the 2020 tournament was cancelled due to the COVID-19 pandemic.

== Tournament field ==
All NCAA Division I women's lacrosse programs were eligible for this championship, and a total of 28 teams were invited to participate. 15 teams qualified automatically by winning their conference tournaments while the remaining 13 teams qualified at-large based on their regular season records.

=== Teams ===
Seed	School	Conference	Berth Type	RPI	Record
1	Maryland	Big Ten	At-large	1	18–1
2	Boston College	ACC	At-large	2	19–1
3	North Carolina	ACC	Automatic	3	15–3
4	Northwestern	Big Ten	Automatic	4	14–4
5	Syracuse	ACC	At-large	5	15–4
6	Virginia	ACC	At-large	6	12–6
7	Princeton	Ivy	Automatic	7	14–3
8	Michigan	Big Ten	At-large	12	15–3
	Colorado	Pac-12	At-large	21	10–7
	Dartmouth	Ivy	At-large	17	11–5
	Denver	Big East	At-large	13	14–3
	Fairfield	MAAC	Automatic	33	15–3
	Florida	American	Automatic	8	13–6
	Georgetown	Big East	Automatic	25	11–8
	High Point	Big South	Automatic	27	15–4
	Jacksonville	Atlantic Sun	Automatic	29	16–3
	James Madison	CAA	Automatic	16	16–3
	Johns Hopkins	Big Ten	At-large	20	10–7
	Loyola (MD)	Patriot	Automatic	10	15–4
	Mercer	SoCon	Automatic	82	10–9
	Navy	Patriot	At-large	11	15–4
	Notre Dame	ACC	At-large	15	13–4
	Penn	Ivy	At-large	14	12–5
	Richmond	Atlantic 10	Automatic	23	17–3
	Stanford	Pac-12	At-large	24	13–5
	Stony Brook	America East	Automatic	19	15–4
	Southern Cal	Pac-12	Automatic	9	16–3
	Wagner	Northeast	Automatic	31	15–3

== Bracket ==
=== Play-in games ===
May 7
Jacksonville*	22
Mercer	7

May 7
Fairfield*	13
Wagner	15

=== Tournament bracket ===
Games on Conference Sports Networks (BTN & BTN+) or ESPN3 for First & Second Rounds. Semifinals on ESPNews & Finals on ESPNU

First Round; May 10; Regional Campus Sites
Stony Brook	10*
James Madison	9
USC	10
Denver	11
Jacksonville	9
8	Michigan*	13
Penn	12
Georgetown	13**
Notre Dame	15
Stanford	9
Florida	16
Johns Hopkins	9
Navy	16
High Point	5
7	Princeton*	19
Wagner	7
Loyola (MD)	19
Richmond	6
Dartmouth	13
Colorado	16

Second Round; May 12; Regional Campus Sites
1	Maryland*	17
Stony Brook	8
Denver	9
8	Michigan	5
5	Syracuse*	14
Georgetown	8
Notre Dame	10
4	Northwestern*	13
3	North Carolina*	15
Florida	11
Navy	12
6	Virginia*	15
7	Princeton	17
Loyola (MD)	13
Colorado	9
2	Boston College*	21

Quarterfinals; May 18; Campus Sites
1	Maryland	17
Denver	8
5	Syracuse	14
4	Northwestern	18
3	North Carolina	14
6	Virginia	7
7	Princeton	12
2	Boston College	17

Semifinals; May 24; Homewood Field
1	Maryland	25
4	Northwestern	13
3	North Carolina	14
2	Boston College	15**

Final; May 26; Homewood Field
1	Maryland	12
2	Boston College	10

- *First and second round host.

== See also ==
- NCAA Division II Women's Lacrosse Championship
- NCAA Division III Women's Lacrosse Championship
- NCAA Division I Men's Lacrosse Championship
