= Jenny Levy =

American lacrosse coach

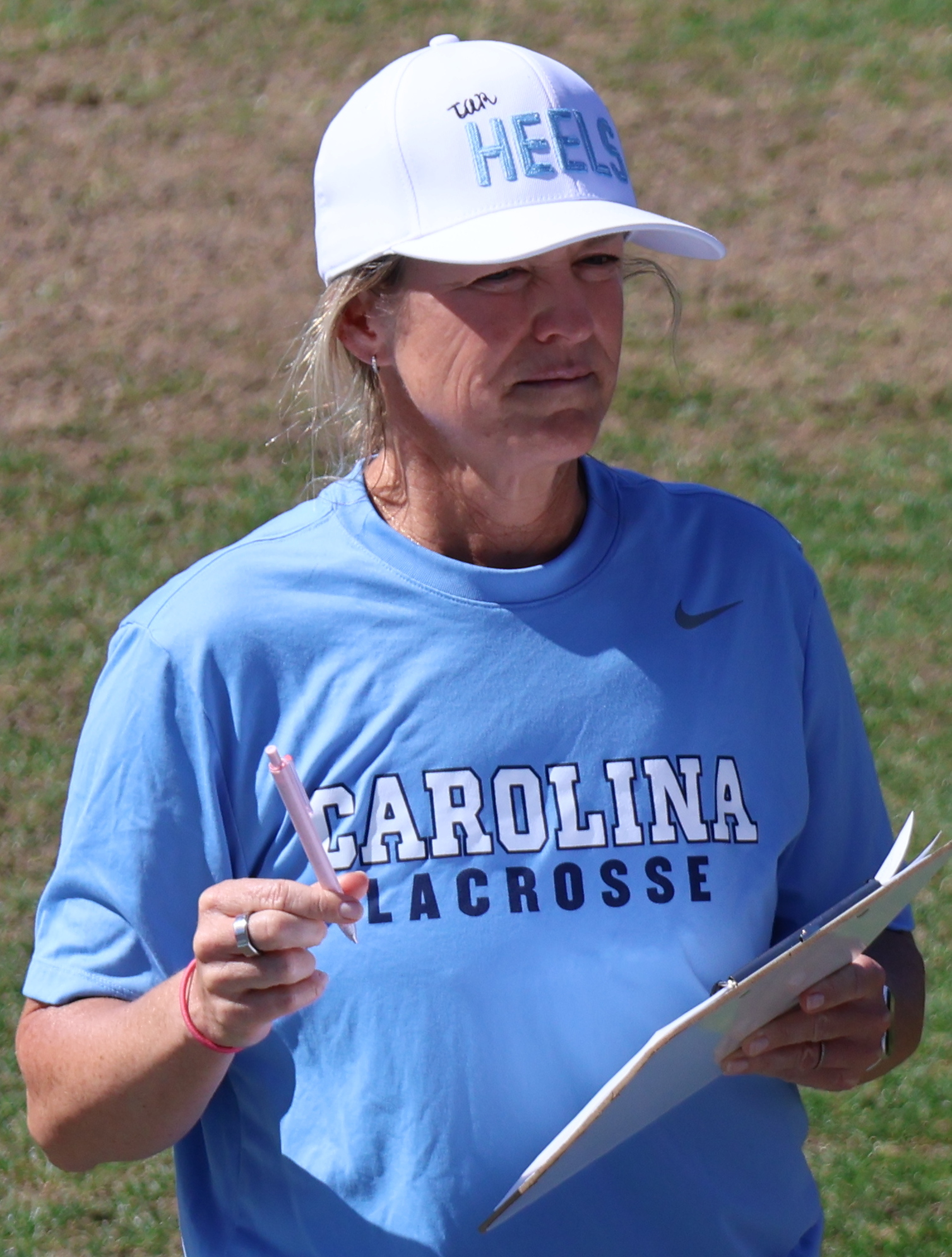
- Levy with North Carolina in 2024

Current position
- Title: Head coach
- Team: North Carolina Tar Heels
- Conference: Atlantic Coast Conference

Biographical details
- Born: Baltimore, Maryland, U.S.
- Education: Virginia
- U.S. Lacrosse Hall of Fame; Inducted in 2021

Jenny Levy is an American college lacrosse coach and former player who has been the head coach of the North Carolina Tar Heels women's lacrosse program since its inception in 1994. She has led North Carolina to four NCAA championships (2013, 2016, 2022, 2025) and has twice been named the National Coach of the Year. She was also named as the head coach of the United States women's national lacrosse team in November 2017. She was inducted into the National Lacrosse Hall of Fame in 2021.

== Lacrosse Experience ==
Born in the lacrosse hotbed of Baltimore, Levy played the sport at the University of Virginia from 1988-1992. Here, she and her team went on to win the first national championship in the school's history. In this 1991 NCAA tournament, Levy was dubbed the most outstanding attacker due to her role as the top scorer in the tournament. She was a member of the United States women's national lacrosse team in 1992-1993, and then again in 1995. She was named as a first-team All American and as the 1992 NCAA Attacker of the Year. She was named as one of the top 50 players in ACC history in 2002.

== Early Coaching ==
From 1993 to 1994 she was the assistant women's lacrosse coach and assistant field hockey coach at Georgetown University. In October 1994, she became the University of North Carolina's first women's lacrosse coach, creating this program from nothing.

== Honors and Accolades ==
Jenny Levy has led her team to a total of four national championships, and is the fourth coach in the history of women's college lacrosse to earn an NCAA title as a player and a coach. In all, she has totaled 46 NCAA tournament wins, which puts her as second in all-time wins by a head coach. In addition to this, Levy has won the most ACC titles by any coach in the history of the league, with a total of eight wins in this division.

== Personal life ==
As for her personal life, Jenny is married to Dan Levy, who played lacrosse at UNC. Together, they have three children: Ryan, Alec, and Kathryn "Kate", who plays on her mother's team.
