= North Carolina Tar Heels women's lacrosse =

- Founded: 1996 (varsity)
- University: University of North Carolina at Chapel Hill
- Head coach: Jenny Levy (29th season)
- Stadium: Dorrance Field (capacity: 4,200)
- Location: Chapel Hill, North Carolina
- Conference: Atlantic Coast Conference
- Nickname: Tar Heels
- Colors: Carolina blue and white

NCAA Tournament championships
- 2013, 2016, 2022, 2025

NCAA Tournament Runner-Up
- 2009, 2015, 2026

NCAA Tournament Final Fours
- 1997, 1998, 2002, 2009, 2010, 2011, 2013, 2015, 2016, 2018, 2019, 2021, 2022, 2025, 2026

NCAA Tournament appearances
- 1997, 1998, 1999, 2000, 2001, 2002, 2005, 2006, 2007, 2008, 2009, 2010, 2011, 2012, 2013, 2014, 2015, 2016, 2017, 2018, 2019, 2021, 2022, 2023, 2024, 2025, 2026

Conference Tournament championships
- 2002, 2016, 2017, 2018, 2019, 2021, 2022, 2025, 2026

Conference regular season championships
- 1998, 2000, 2006, 2010, 2012, 2015, 2016, 2017, 2021, 2022, 2025, 2026

The North Carolina Tar Heels women's lacrosse team represents the University of North Carolina at Chapel Hill in National Collegiate Athletic Association (NCAA) Division I women's lacrosse and currently competes as a member of the Atlantic Coast Conference (ACC). North Carolina is led by head coach Jenny Levy. The Tar Heels have won four national championships, in 2013, 2016, 2022, and 2025, and 9 ACC championships.

== History ==
=== Program beginnings ===
UNC started a women's lacrosse program in 1994 due to Title IX. Jenny Levy, a recent graduate from the University of Virginia was hired as the head coach. Reflecting on why she was hired Levy stated, “I was 24 years old, and I think I got hired because I was pretty cheap, very ambitious and high energy, I believed in the school and what we could sell here to student-athletes with academic opportunity and great tradition. I focused on what I knew and could do.”

The task of creating a successful women's lacrosse team was challenging; during the preliminary years of the program Levy had only a part-time assistant and a small budget. She still managed to bring in talented recruits, some of which were transfers and some were members of the UNC women's soccer team, which at the time had 14 NCAA Championships in 16 years.

Another obstacle was being a part of the Atlantic Coast Conference (ACC), which had the University of Maryland and the University of Virginia, two established women's lacrosse teams. Levy stated, “we rose pretty quickly, but there was not a lot of foundation, and it is very hard to establish tradition when you are a young program; sitting where I am today, I have learned that it takes a while to establish things that identify with the program that is unique to just that program.”

Although the task at hand was difficult the Tar Heels started out with success early on with a 12–4 record in its first varsity season of 1996. In their second year, UNC made the NCAA semifinals with a 14–4 record, tallying two victories against the Virginia Cavaliers. In UNC's third season, the Tar Heels beat the eventual NCAA champion Maryland two times and reached the semifinals of the NCAA again. By the third season in program history UNC claimed the number 2 overall ranking.

Levy's program grew stronger as years passed and certain perks came along with that success; Levy was granted a full-time assistant and UNC started to increase their athletic support staff overall.

Levy spoke of the early years saying “It was a gradual process of pushing and asking; it was a process for all Carolina sports, and slowly we have made progress with that, but even with it, the athletic program has been very successful.”

=== 2013 national championship ===
When asked about constructing a national championship-type team, Head Coach Levy stated that “its not just a one-year thing for us." The team expects success because they have been a perennial final four team for the past 5 years. Even though they had not won a national title until 2013 they expect to be in a position to do so year in and year out. She stressed the importance of the recruiting process; the team consists of not only talented lacrosse players, but also hard workers with an ability to sacrifice self-interest for the team. The freshmen are expected to be on “a constant ascension of personal development, athletically, academically, and in the community."

The 2013 Tar Heels had a small senior class with only 5 players and ended their previous season with an early loss in the post season (their first time not making it to the final-four in three years). This was the first year that Katrina Dowd joined the coaching staff to help build a dynamic attacking unit. This was a young team with a lot of change going into the 2013 season. In the season opener against The University of Florida, the Tar Heels lost 5–3. The team went on an 11-game winning streak after the loss to Florida, but the margins of victory were not very large. Their most notable win during the 11 game winning streak was their 11–8 win over the reigning national champions, Northwestern. The Tar Heels went on to defeat every team they played besides Maryland once in regular season (April 6) and once in the ACC Championship (April 28). These two losses were crucial to the team's success in the NCAA tournament because they eventually took down the Terrapins in a triple-overtime thriller to secure their first national championship in the 18-year program history.

When Jenny Levy was asked: "What’s it going to take for UNC to repeat as national champions?" she responded "Nothing’s changed, but everything has changed. We’re a tough group, and I think more than anything this championship is a tipping point for us because it validates what we’ve always talked about. Now our players have experienced that and they won’t forget that. We’re going to enjoy the championship right now but we’ll begin again in August and we’ll start from the very beginning and work our way back up. It took a lot of hard work, a lot of belief and a lot of trust and I think those lessons will stay with us for a long time."

=== 2016 national championship ===
North Carolina won their second national championship at the 2016 NCAA Division I women's lacrosse tournament. The Tar Heels got a first round bye and defeated Duke and Notre Dame on their way to the Final Four. In the Final Four, they defeated Penn State 12-11 to advance to the national title game. In the 2016 championship game, North Carolina defeated Maryland 13-7.

=== 2022 national championship ===
The Tar Heels won their third national title at the 2022 NCAA Division I women's lacrosse tournament. After receiving a first round bye, UNC beat Virginia, Stony Brook, and Northwestern on their way to the national title game. In the national finals, they defeated Boston College 12-11 to win the championship.

=== 2025 national championship ===
North Carolina won their fourth national title at the 2025 NCAA Division I women's lacrosse tournament. The Tar Heels defeated Florida 20-4 in the Final Four and beat Northwestern 12-8 in the national title game. They finished the season with an undefeated 22-0 record.

== Individual career records ==
As of 29 May 2022

Record	Number	Player	Years
Goals	334	Jamie Ortega	2018-2022
Assists	233	Katie Hoeg	2017-2021
Points	466	Jamie Ortega	2018-2022
Ground balls	200	Jenn Cook	2004–07
Draw controls	360	Ally Mastroianni	2018-2022
Saves	667	Taylor Moreno	2018-2022
Save %	.592	Debbie Castine	1996–99
GAA	6.13	Debbie Castine	1996–99

== Individual single-season records ==
As of 25 August 2026

Record	Number	Player	Year
Goals	109	Chloe Humphrey	2026
Assists	90	Ashley Humphrey	2025
Points	159	Chloe Humphrey	2026
Ground balls	87	Sarah Dacey	1997
Draw controls	165	Marie McCool	2018
Saves	178	Caylee Waters	2017
Save %	.602	Debbie Castine	1996; 1997
GAA	5.52	Debbie Castine	1997

== Seasons ==
Record table
Season	Coach	Overall	Conference	Standing	Postseason
NCAA Division I (Independent) (1996–1996)
1996	Jenny Levy	12–4			
NCAA Division I (Atlantic Coast Conference) (1997–present)
1997	Jenny Levy	14–4	2–1	2nd	NCAA Semifinal
1998	Jenny Levy	15–3	3–0	1st	NCAA Semifinal
1999	Jenny Levy	8–7	1–2	T-2nd	NCAA First Round
2000	Jenny Levy	12–6	2–1	T-1st	NCAA Quarterfinal
2001	Jenny Levy	11–7	1–2	3rd	NCAA Quarterfinal
2002	Jenny Levy	17–3	2–1	2nd	NCAA Semifinal
2003	Jenny Levy	7–9	0–3	4th	
2004	Jenny Levy	9–7	0–3	4th	
2005	Jenny Levy	14–6	2–2	T-2nd	NCAA Quarterfinal
2006	Jenny Levy	13–6	4–1	T-1st	NCAA Quarterfinal
2007	Jenny Levy	16–5	3–2	T-2nd	NCAA Quarterfinal
2008	Jenny Levy	13–7	2–3	T-3rd	NCAA Quarterfinal
2009	Jenny Levy	16–5	4–1	2nd	NCAA Runner-up
2010	Jenny Levy	17–3	4–1	T-1st	NCAA Semifinal
2011	Jenny Levy	15–6	3–2	3rd	NCAA Semifinal
2012	Jenny Levy	15–4	5–0	1st	NCAA Quarterfinal
2013	Jenny Levy	18–3	4–1	2nd	NCAA Champions
2014	Jenny Levy	15–5	5–2	2nd	NCAA Quarterfinal
2015	Jenny Levy	18–4	6–1	1st	NCAA Runner-up
2016	Jenny Levy	20–2	7–0	1st	NCAA Champions
2017	Jenny Levy	17–3	7–0	1st	NCAA Quarterfinal
2018	Jenny Levy	17–4	6–1	2nd	NCAA Semifinal
2019	Jenny Levy	17–4	5–2	2nd	NCAA Semifinal
2020	Jenny Levy	7–0	2–0	1st	Cancelled
2021	Jenny Levy	20–1	9–0	1st	NCAA Semifinal
2022	Jenny Levy	22–0	8–0	1st	NCAA Champions
2023	Jenny Levy	16–5	7–2	2nd	NCAA Quarterfinal
2024	Jenny Levy	10-7	6-3	3rd	NCAA First Round
2025	Jenny Levy	22–0	8–0	1st	NCAA Champions
Total:		443–130 (.773)			
National champion Postseason invitational champion Conference regular season champion Conference regular season and conference tournament champion Division regular season champion Division regular season and conference tournament champion Conference tournament champion

== Individual honors ==
First Team All Americans

- Sarah Darcey-1996
- Erin McGinnis- 1998
- Brooke Crawford- 1998, 1999
- Porter Wilkinson- 2000, 2002
- Christine McPike- 2001, 2002
- Andy Fortino- 2002
- Kellie Thompson- 2002
- Jenn Cook- 2005, 2006, 2007
- Amber Falcon- 2008, 2009
- Logan Ripley- 2009
- Jenn Russell- 2009, 2010
- Kristen Carr, 2010
- Corey Donohoe- 2012, 2011
- Mia Hurrin- 2011
- Laura Zimmerman – 2011, 2012
- Becky Lynch- 2012
- Sloane Serpe- 2013, 2014
- Kara Cannazzaro- 2013
- Abbey Friend – 2014
- Molly Hendrick - 2016
- Marie McCool - 2016, 2017, 2018
- Katie Hoeg - 2018, 2020, 2021
- Jamie Ortega - 2019, 2020, 2021, 2022
- Emma Trenchard - 2019, 2020, 2021, 2022
- Ally Mastroianni - 2021, 2022
- Taylor Moreno - 2021
- Emily Nalls - 2023
- Brooklyn Walker-Welch - 2023, 2025
- Sam Forrest - 2025, 2026
- Ashley Humphrey - 2025
- Chloe Humphrey - 2025, 2026
- Eliza Osburn - 2026

Tewaaraton Finalists

- Christine McPike, 2002
- Amber Falcone, 2009
- Jenn Russell, 2010
- Becky Lynch, 2012
- Kara Cannazzaro, 2013
- Marie McCool 2017, 2018
- Jamie Ortega 2021, 2022
- Taylor Moreno 2021
- Ally Mastroiani, 2022
- Ashley Humphrey, 2025
- Chloe Humphrey, 2025, 2026

Tewaaraton Winner

- Chloe Humphrey, 2025

== Postseason Results ==
The Tar Heels have appeared in 24 NCAA tournaments. Their postseason record is 42–21.

Year	Seed	Round	Opponent	Score
1997	–	Quarterfinal; Semifinal	Virginia; Loyola (MD)	W, 12–11 (ot); L, 8–10
1998	#2	Quarterfinal; Semifinal	Temple #3 Maryland	W, 10–9; L, 9–14
1999	–	First Round	Georgetown	L, 6–7
2000	#4	Quarterfinal	Loyola (MD)	L, 5–7
2001	#6	First Round; Quarterfinal	#11 Syracuse #3 Georgetown	W, 14–9; L, 4–10
2002	#3	First Round; Quarterfinal; Semifinal	UMBC; Virginia #2 Princeton	W, 22–6; W, 14–13 (2ot); L, 2–16
2005	–	First Round; Quarterfinal	#7 Penn State #2 Duke	W, 7–6 (3ot); L, 7–15
2006	#5	First Round; Quarterfinal	Maryland #4 Northwestern	W, 9–6; L, 6–17
2007	#6	First Round; Quarterfinal	Richmond #3 Virginia	W, 14–7; L, 8–14
2008	–	First Round; Quarterfinal	#4 Virginia #5 Syracuse	W, 11–7; L, 11–13
2009	#3	First Round; Quarterfinal; Semifinal; Final	Towson #6 Notre Dame #2 Maryland #1 Northwestern	W, 15–4; W, 16–10; W, 8–7; L, 7–21
2010	#3	First Round; Quarterfinal; Semifinal	Navy #6 Virginia #2 Northwestern	W, 18–5; W, 17–7; L, 10–15
2011	#3	First Round; Quarterfinal; Semifinal	Virginia #6 Loyola (MD) #2 Northwestern	W, 15–7; W, 16–13; L, 10–11
2012	#5	First Round; Quarterfinal	Navy #4 Syracuse	W, 14–7; L, 16–17
2013	#3	Second Round; Quarterfinal; Semifinal; Final	Loyola (MD); Virginia #2 Northwestern #1 Maryland	W, 19–9; W, 13–9; W, 11–4; W, 13–12 (3ot)
2014	#3	Second Round; Quarterfinal	Georgetown #6 Virginia	W, 10–8; L, 9–10
2015	#2	Second Round; Quarterfinal; Semifinal; Final	Florida; Penn State #3 Duke #1 Maryland	W, 11–6; W, 11–8; W, 16–7; L, 8–9
2016	#3	Second Round; Quarterfinal; Semifinal; Final	Duke #6 Notre Dame; Penn State #1 Maryland	W, 15–10; W, 10–6; W, 12–11; W, 13–7
2017	#2	Second Round; Quarterfinal	Virginia; Navy	W, 23–12; L, 14–16
2018	#2	Second Round; Quarterfinal; Semifinal	Virginia Tech; Northwestern #3 James Madison	W, 17–8; W, 19–14; L, 12–15
2019	#3	Second Round; Quarterfinal; Semifinal	Florida; Virginia; Boston College	W, 15–11; W, 14-7; L, 14–15 (2ot)
2021	#1	Second Round; Quarterfinal; Semifinal	James Madison #8 Stony Brook #4 Boston College	W, 14–9; W, 14–11; L, 10–11
2022	#1	Second Round; Quarterfinal; Semifinal; Final	Virginia #8 Stony Brook #4 Northwestern #3 Boston College	W, 24–2; W, 8–5; W, 15–14; W, 12–11
2023	#4	First Round; Second Round; Quarterfinal	Sacred Heart; Richmond #5 Denver	W, 16–5; W, 16–12; L, 4–5
2024	-	First Round	Florida	L, 8-17
2025	#1	Second Round; Quarterfinal; Semifinal; Final	Clemson; Princeton #4 Florida #3 Northwestern	W, 18-9; W, 19-10; W, 20-4; W, 12-8

== Coaching staff ==
Jenny Levy

- The sixth-winningest coach in NCAA Division I women's lacrosse history and the fourth-winningest active coach in the nation, Levy has led the Tar Heels to seven appearances in the NCAA Tournament semifinals, including four in the last five years.
- An outstanding women's lacrosse player at the University of Virginia from 1988–92 and a field hockey assistant and a women's lacrosse assistant coach at Georgetown University from 1993–94, Levy was named as Carolina's first-ever head women's lacrosse coach in October 1994.
- A member of the UVa women's lacrosse team from 1988–1992 and was named the squad's captain and most valuable player as a senior. She led the Cavaliers to their first-ever Division I National Collegiate Women's Lacrosse Championship in 1991. She scored three goals in the championship game and five in the national semifinal game, leading to her selection as the tournament's Most Outstanding Attacker.
- A first-team All-America as a junior and senior, Levy was named the 1992 NCAA Attack Player-of-the-Year. She led Virginia in both goals and assists in 1992 with 52 and 13, respectively, and finished with career totals of 118 goals and 34 assists. In 2002, she was named one of the top 50 players in ACC history. In 2005, she was inducted into the Greater Baltimore Chapter of the Lacrosse Hall of Fame.
- She married Dan Levy of Baltimore, Md., in June 1998. Dan is a 1993 UNC graduate who played lacrosse at Carolina for four years, starring on the 1991 NCAA championship team.
- The couple has three children – Ryan (born in Jan. 2002), Alec (born in Sept. 2003) and Kathryn (born in July 2006)

Phil Barnes

- A fixture on Jenny Levy's staff for a decade, Phil Barnes is one of the nation's most experienced assistants and a key part of what Levy calls one of the best coaching staffs in America. In November 2012, the IWLCA named Barnes its assistant coach of the year.
- On the field, Barnes works with the Tar Heel defense and goalkeepers, while also heading up the program's recruiting efforts.
- He was the head coach at UMass for three seasons (2000–02), capturing the Atlantic 10 regular-season and tournament championships and leading the nation in scoring defense in 2000
- Barnes earned a B.A. in history from Assumption College in 1998. He is a native of Milford, N.H.

Katrina Dowd

- Katrina Dowd, one of the top players in women's lacrosse history, is in her second season as first assistant coach at North Carolina. She joined Jenny Levy's staff in the summer of 2012 after a season as an assistant at Syracuse. Her duties include recruiting and coaching the offense and draws.
- Dowd posted a stellar playing career at Northwestern, where she helped the Wildcats to three consecutive national championships from 2007–09. She also is a standout for the United States National Team, joining former Tar Heel players Kristen Carr, Amber Falcone, Jenn Russell and Laura Zimmerman on the 2012–14 U.S. women's national senior team.
- A native of Yorktown Heights, N.Y., Dowd was a two-time first-team IWLCA All-America at Northwestern (2009, 2010), winning three NCAA championships (2007, 2008, 2009).
- She led the '09 Wildcats to their fifth consecutive national title, scoring a team-high 75 goals and earning NCAA Tournament Most Valuable Player Award honors. She was the 2010 IWLCA Attacker of the Year and a Tewaaraton Award finalist, finishing the season with 110 points on 77 goals and 33 assists.
- In her career, Dowd compiled 209 goals and 58 assists for 267 total points in 88 games. She finished her career fourth in Northwestern history in goals, and in the Top 10 in assists, ground balls, caused turnovers and draw controls. Dowd finished her career as the all-time NCAA Tournament leader in goals (45) while ranking fourth in points (52).
- Dowd coached at Syracuse for the 2012 season, helping lead the Orange to the NCAA championship game for the first time in program history.
