= 2021 NCAA Division I women's lacrosse tournament =

College lacrosse tournament

- Dates: May 14–30, 2021
- Teams: 29
- Finals site: Johnny Unitas Stadium, Towson, MD
- Champions: Boston College (1st title)
- Runner-up: Syracuse (3rd title game)
- Semifinalists: North Carolina (11th Final Four); Northwestern (12th Final Four)
- Winning coach: Acacia Walker-Weinstein (1st title)
- MOP: Charlotte North, Boston College

The 2021 NCAA Division I Women's Lacrosse Championship was the 39th annual single-elimination tournament to determine the national champion of Division I NCAA women's college lacrosse. The semifinal and championship rounds were played at Johnny Unitas Stadium in Towson, MD from May 28–30, 2021. All other rounds were played at campus sites, usually at the home field of the higher-seeded team, from May 14–22. This was the first NCAA tournament since the 2019 NCAA tournament after the 2020 edition was cancelled due to the COVID-19 pandemic.

== Tournament field ==
All NCAA Division I women's lacrosse programs were eligible for this championship, and a total of 29 teams were invited to participate. 15 teams qualified automatically by winning their conference tournaments while the remaining 14 teams qualified at-large based on their regular season records.

=== Teams ===
Seed	School	Conference	Berth Type	RPI	Record
1	North Carolina	ACC	Automatic	1	18–0
2	Northwestern	Big Ten	Automatic	7	13–0
3	Syracuse	ACC	At-large	2	14–3
4	Boston College	ACC	At-large	3	13–3
5	Notre Dame	ACC	At-large	6	9–6
6	Florida	American	Automatic	10	16–2
7	Duke	ACC	At-large	21	9–7
8	Stony Brook	America East	Automatic	5	14–2
	UConn	Big East	At-large	30	12–6
	Denver	Big East	Automatic	13	14–3
	Drexel	CAA	At-large	4	13–2
	Fairfield	MAAC	Automatic	14	13–1
	High Point	Big South	Automatic	38	10–7
	Hofstra	CAA	At-large	11	6–6
	Jacksonville	ASUN	Automatic	17	11–1
	James Madison	CAA	Automatic	15	11–4
	Johns Hopkins	Big Ten	At-large	46	8–6
	Loyola (MD)	Patriot	Automatic	8	11–2
	Maryland	Big Ten	At-large	36	9–6
	Massachusetts	Atlantic 10	Automatic	12	15–2
	Mercer	SoCon	Automatic	45	7–7
	Mount St. Mary's	NEC	Automatic	16	14–2
	Robert Morris	MAC	Automatic	39	14–2
	Rutgers	Big Ten	At-large	54	6–8
	Stanford	Pac-12	Automatic	9	11–0
	Temple	American	At-large	18	12–5
	Towson	CAA	At-large	23	9–8
	Vanderbilt	American	At-large	19	12–6
	Virginia	ACC	At-large	25	8–8

== Bracket ==
=== Tournament bracket ===
Games on Conference Sports Networks (BTN & BTN+) or ESPN3 for First & Second Rounds. Semifinals on ESPNews & Finals on ESPNU.

First Round; May 14; Regional Campus Sites
James Madison	9
Johns Hopkins	6
Drexel	13
Rutgers	16
Towson	8
8	Stony Brook*	14
5	Notre Dame*	16
Robert Morris	0
Virginia	19
UConn	13
Massachusetts	13
Temple	14
Fairfield	6
4	Boston College*	19
Loyola (MD)*	11
Hofstra	9
Jacksonville	20
Vanderbilt	12
Mercer	5
6	Florida*	23
7	Duke*	19
Mount St. Mary’s	13
Maryland	17
High Point	6
Stanford	13
Denver	15

Second Round; May 16; Regional Campus Sites
1	North Carolina*	14
James Madison	9
Rutgers	8
8	Stony Brook	20
5	Notre Dame	13
Virginia	8
4	Boston College	21
Temple	11
3	Syracuse*	20
Loyola (MD)	8
Jacksonville	3
6	Florida*	17
7	Duke*	13
Maryland	12
Denver	4
2	Northwestern*	19

Quarterfinals; May 22; Campus Sites
1	North Carolina*	14
8	Stony Brook*	11
5	Notre Dame	10
4	Boston College	21
3	Syracuse*	17
6	Florida*	11
7	Duke	10
2	Northwestern*	22

Semifinals; May 28; Johnny Unitas Stadium
1	North Carolina	10
4	Boston College	11
3	Syracuse	21
2	Northwestern*	13

Final; May 30; Johnny Unitas Stadium
4	Boston College	16
3	Syracuse	10

- *First and second round host.

== See also ==
- NCAA Division II Women's Lacrosse Championship
- NCAA Division III Women's Lacrosse Championship
- NCAA Division I Men's Lacrosse Championship
