= James Madison Dukes women's lacrosse =

- Founded: 1974; 52 years ago
- University: James Madison University
- Head coach: Shelley Klaes-Bawcombe (since 2007 season)
- Stadium: Sentara Park (capacity: 1500)
- Location: Harrisonburg, Virginia
- Conference: American Conference
- Nickname: Dukes
- Colors: Purple and gold

NCAA Tournament championships
- 2018

NCAA Tournament Final Fours
- 2000, 2018

NCAA Tournament appearances
- 1995, 1997, 1998, 1999, 2000, 2001, 2003, 2004, 2006, 2010, 2011, 2015, 2016, 2017, 2018, 2019, 2021, 2022, 2023, 2024, 2025, 2026

Conference Tournament championships
- 1997, 1999, 2001, 2003, 2004, 2006, 2010, 2011, 2015, 2017, 2018, 2019, 2021, 2025, 2026

Conference regular season championships
- 1995, 1999, 2000, 2004, 2006, 2010, 2011, 2013, 2014, 2016, 2017, 2018, 2019, 2022, 2023, 2025

The James Madison Dukes women's lacrosse team is an NCAA Division I college lacrosse team representing James Madison University as part of the American Conference. They play their home games at Sentara Park in Harrisonburg, Virginia. The Dukes have been led by Shelley Klaes-Bawcombe since 2007. In 2018, the Dukes won the National Championship, beating Boston College 16–15.

The Dukes had been conference members of the Colonial Athletic Association, now known as the Coastal Athletic Association, since the conference began sponsoring the sport in 1992. With JMU having moved most of its other sports to the Sun Belt Conference, which does not sponsor women's lacrosse, in July 2022, the Dukes joined the American Athletic Conference, now known as the American Conference, as an affiliate member at that time.

== Individual career records ==
Record	Amount	Player	Years
Goals	298	Isabella Peterson	2020–24
Assists	121	Monica Zabel	2009–12
Points	363	Isabella Peterson	2020–24
Ground balls	187	Lisa Staedt	2000–03
Draw controls	485	Maddie Epke	2023–25
Caused turnovers	135	Mairead Durkin	2019–23
Saves	648	Joy Jones	1985–88
Save %	.607	Chris Bauer	1982–84
GAA	7.31	Meg Cortezi	1993–96

== Individual single-season records ==
Record	Amount	Player	Year
Goals	91	Isabella Peterson	2023
Assists	60 (2)	Katie Kerrigan; Payton Root	2018; 2026
Points	114	Isabella Peterson	2023
Ground balls	76	Lisa Staedt	2003
Draw controls	235	Maddie Epke	2025
Caused turnovers	59	Olivia Rongo	2026
Saves	203	Jennifer Corradini	2001
Save %	.646	Joy Jones	1987
GAA	5.31	Joy Jones	1988

== Seasons ==
Record table
Season	Coach	Overall	Conference	Standing	Postseason
USWLA (1974–1977)
1974	Gay Hall	6–3			
1975	Becky Burch	6–7			
1976	Janet Luce	5–6–1			
1977		7–5–1			
USWLA (Virginia Women's Lacrosse Association) (1978–1980)
1978		8–6–1		1st	
1979		8–9		3rd	
1980	Dee McDonough	7–6		3rd	
AIAW (Virginia Association for Intercollegiate Athletics for Women) (1981–1981)
1981		13–5		1st	
NCAA Division I (Virginia Association for Intercollegiate Athletics for Women) (1982–1982)
1982		9–7		3rd	
NCAA Division I (Virginia Intercollegiate League) (1983–1984)
1983		10–7		2nd	
1984		7–7		1st	
NCAA Division I (South Atlantic Conference) (1985–1991)
1985		8–10		1st	
1986		8–7		1st	
1987		4–9		3rd	
1988		11–5		2nd	
1989		6–7		3rd	
1990		5–9		3rd	
1991		7–7		2nd	
NCAA Division I (CAA) (1992–2022)
1992		9–8	3–2	3rd	
1993		6–10	3–3	4th	
1994		8–9	3–4	5th	
1995	Jennifer Ulehla	12–4	6–1	T-1st	NCAA Quarterfinal
1996		9–8	3–3	4th	
1997		13–5	4–2	3rd	NCAA Quarterfinal
1998		11–8	5–1	2nd	NCAA Quarterfinal
1999		13–5	6–0	1st	NCAA Quarterfinal
2000		13–5	6–0	1st	NCAA Semifinal
2001		11–9	3–3	T-3rd	NCAA Quarterfinal
2002		8–10	5–3	3rd	
2003	Kellie Young	13–6	6–1	2nd	NCAA First Round
2004		16–4	7–0	1st	NCAA Quarterfinal
2005		7–9	2–5	T-6th	
2006		15–5	6–1	1st	NCAA Quarterfinal
2007	Shelley Klaes-Bawcombe	13–5	5–2	T-2nd	
2008		7–9	3–4	6th	
2009		5–11	1–6	7th	
2010		17–3	7–0	1st	NCAA Quarterfinal
2011		15–4	6–1	T-1st	NCAA First Round
2012		11–7	6–1	2nd	
2013		11–6	6–1	T-1st	
2014		11–7	4–1	T-1st	
2015		15–5	5–1	2nd	NCAA First Round
2016		10–10	5–1	T-1st	NCAA First Round
2017		14–7	5–1	1st	NCAA Second Round
2018		22–1	6–0	1st	NCAA Champions
2019		16–4	6–0	1st	NCAA First Round
2020		5–1	0–0		Cancelled due to the COVID-19 pandemic
2021		12–5	3–1	T-1st (South)	NCAA Second Round
2022		14–5	6–0	1st	NCAA Second Round
NCAA Division I (American Conference) (2023–present)
2023		19–3	6–0	1st	NCAA Quarterfinals
2024		14–6	5–1	2nd	NCAA Second Round
2025		14–5	6–0	1st	NCAA First Round
2026		14–7	6–1	2nd	NCAA Second Round
Total:		571–337 (.629)			
National champion Postseason invitational champion Conference regular season champion Conference regular season and conference tournament champion Division regular season champion Division regular season and conference tournament champion Conference tournament champion

== Postseason Results ==
The Dukes have appeared in 22 NCAA tournaments. Their postseason record is 18–21. They were National Champions in 2018.

Year	Seed	Round	Opponent	Score
1995	–	Quarterfinal	Penn State	L, 7–11
1997	–	Quarterfinal	Temple	L, 10–17
1998	–	First Round; Quarterfinal	William & Mary #3 Maryland	W, 15–9; L, 8–13
1999	–	First Round; Quarterfinal	Rutgers #3 Duke	W, 11–6; L, 10–11
2000	#3	Quarterfinal; Semifinal	Virginia #2 Princeton	W, 12–5; L, 9–15
2001	#9	First Round; Quarterfinal	#8 Virginia #1 Maryland	W, 11–8; L, 9–11
2003	–	First Round	Georgetown	L, 5–9
2004	–	First Round	Johns Hopkins; Vanderbilt	W, 14–9; L, 4–10
2006	#8	First Round; Quarterfinal	Richmond #1 Duke	W, 9–8; L, 6–16
2010	–	First Round; Quarterfinal	Stanford; Syracuse	W, 9–8; L, 3–7
2011	#8	First Round	Princeton	L, 10–11
2015	–	First Round	USC	L, 10–13
2016	–	First Round	Stanford	L, 8–9
2017	–	First Round; Second Round	Louisville #4 Penn State	W, 12–6; L, 14–19
2018	#3	Second Round; Quarterfinals; Semifinals; Championship	Virginia #6 Florida #2 North Carolina #4 Boston College	W, 15–12; W, 11–8; W, 15–12; W, 16–15
2019	–	First Round	Stony Brook	L, 9–10
2021	–	First Round; Second Round	Johns Hopkins #1 North Carolina	W, 9–6; L, 9–14
2022	–	First Round; Second Round	UConn #6 Loyola (MD)	W, 17–5; L, 8–18
2023	#7	First Round; Second Round; Quarterfinal	Army; Maryland #2 Syracuse	W, 12–8; W, 15–14; L, 7–13
2024	–	First Round; Second Round	Penn State #4 Maryland	W, 14–13; L, 7–17
2025	–	First Round	Duke	L, 10–17
2026	–	First Round; Second Round	Notre Dame #1 Northwestern	W, 13–12; L, 5–17
