= 2014 NCAA Division I women's lacrosse tournament =

Sporting event

- Dates: May 9–25, 2014
- Teams: 26
- Finals site: Johnny Unitas Stadium, Towson, Maryland
- Champions: Maryland (11th title)
- Runner-up: Syracuse (2nd title game)
- Semifinalists: Northwestern (10th Final Four); Virginia (14th Final Four)
- Winning coach: Cathy Reese (2nd title)
- MOP: Taylor Cummings, Maryland
- Attendance: 10,311 finals 18,567 total

The 2014 NCAA Division I Women's Lacrosse Championship was the thirty-third annual single-elimination tournament to determine the national championship for National Collegiate Athletic Association (NCAA) Division I women's college lacrosse. The tournament began with first-round play on May 9, and concluded with the championship game played at Johnny Unitas Stadium of Towson University in Towson, Maryland, on May 25, 2014. The Maryland Terrapins were the 2014 NCAA Tournament champions.

== Dates and locations ==
The NCAA Tournament's ten first-round games were played Friday, May 9, and eight second-round games were played Sunday, May 11. First- and second-round games were hosted by the eight ranked teams. The four quarterfinal games were played Saturday, May 17 on the home fields of the higher-seeded teams. The winners of the four quarterfinal games advanced to the two semifinal games played on May 23 and hosted by Towson University at Johnny Unitas Stadium, the home field of the Towson Tigers football and lacrosse teams. The tournament championship game was played at Johnny Unitas Stadium on May 25.

== Tournament field ==
Thirteen teams automatically qualified for the tournament by virtue of winning their respective conference championships. These teams included No. 1 seed Maryland of the Atlantic Coast Conference (ACC) and No. 4 seed Florida of the American Lacrosse Conference (ALC). The remaining thirteen tournament teams were chosen by the NCAA Division I Women's Lacrosse Committee on an at-large basis; the factors considered by the selection committee included: (1) the NCAA's ratings percentage index (RPI); (2) results against common opponents; (3) significant wins and losses; and (4) evaluation of the ten highest-rated teams on a team's schedule, as defined by strength of schedule and winning percentage.

The tournament selection committee also awarded seeds to eight tournament teams, granting them the right to host first- and second-round tournament games. In addition, the top six seeds received byes in the first round. Selections were dominated by the ACC, which placed seven teams in the field, including six of the eight seeded teams and the top three teams overall.

=== Teams ===
| Seed | School | Conference | Berth Type | RPI | Record |
|---|---|---|---|---|---|
| 1 | Maryland | ACC | Automatic | 2 | 19–1 |
| 2 | Syracuse | ACC | At-large | 1 | 18–2 |
| 3 | North Carolina | ACC | At-large | 3 | 14–4 |
| 4 | Florida | ALC | Automatic | 4 | 17–2 |
| 5 | Northwestern | ALC | At-large | 5 | 12–6 |
| 6 | Virginia | ACC | At-large | 16 | 10–8 |
| 7 | Boston College | ACC | At-large | 6 | 13–5 |
| 8 | Notre Dame | ACC | At-large | 10 | 9–8 |
| | Bryant | NEC | Automatic | 33 | 15–3 |
| | Canisius | MAAC | Automatic | 25 | 12–6 |
| | Denver | MPSF | Automatic | 9 | 18–1 |
| | Duke | ACC | At-large | 13 | 9–7 |
| | Georgetown | Big East | At-large | 23 | 10–8 |
| | High Point | Big South | Automatic | 28 | 14–5 |
| | Jacksonville | Atlantic Sun | Automatic | 44 | 14–5 |
| | Johns Hopkins | ALC | At-large | 21 | 15–4 |
| | Louisville | Big East | Automatic | 22 | 15–3 |
| | Loyola (MD) | Patriot | Automatic | 12 | 14–5 |
| | Massachusetts | Atlantic 10 | Automatic | 8 | 18–1 |
| | Ohio State | ALC | At-large | 15 | 13–6 |
| | Penn | Ivy | Automatic | 7 | 12–4 |
| | Penn State | ALC | At-large | 19 | 10–7 |
| | Princeton | Ivy | At-large | 17 | 11–6 |
| | Stanford | MPSF | At-large | 18 | 14–4 |
| | Stony Brook | America East | Automatic | 11 | 16–3 |
| | Towson | CAA | Automatic | 20 | 11–7 |

== Tournament bracket ==
The 2014 NCAA Tournament bracket consisted of 26 teams, eight of whom were seeded No. 1 through No. 8.

First round May 9
Canisius | 4
Penn | 9
8 | Notre Dame | 18
High Point | 4
Duke | 13
Stanford | 8
Denver | 12
Jacksonville | 8
Louisville | 11
Ohio State | 10
Stony Brook | 10
Towson | 8
7 | Boston College | 17
Bryant | 9
Loyola | 10
Massachusetts | 4
Georgetown | 9
Johns Hopkins | 8
Penn State | 13
Princeton | 16

Second round May 11
1 | Maryland | 13
Penn | 5
8 | Notre Dame | 8
Duke | 10
4 | Florida | 19
Denver | 9
5 | Northwestern | 11
Louisville | 8
2 | Syracuse | 13
Stony Brook | 6
7 | Boston College | 8
Loyola | 3
3 | North Carolina | 10
Georgetown | 8
6 | Virginia | 13
Princeton | 11

Quarterfinals; May 17
1 | Maryland | 15
Duke | 8
4 | Florida | 11
5 | Northwestern | 12
2 | Syracuse | 11
7 | Boston College | 9
3 | North Carolina | 9
6 | Virginia | 10

Semifinals; May 23; Towson, Maryland
1 | Maryland | 9
5 | Northwestern | 6
2 | Syracuse | 16
6 | Virginia | 8

Championship; May 25; Towson, Maryland
1 | Maryland | 15
2 | Syracuse | 12

== See also ==
- NCAA Division I Women's Lacrosse Championship
- 2014 NCAA Division I Men's Lacrosse Championship
