= Johns Hopkins Blue Jays women's lacrosse =

National Collegiate Athletic Association (NCAA) Division I women's college lacrosse

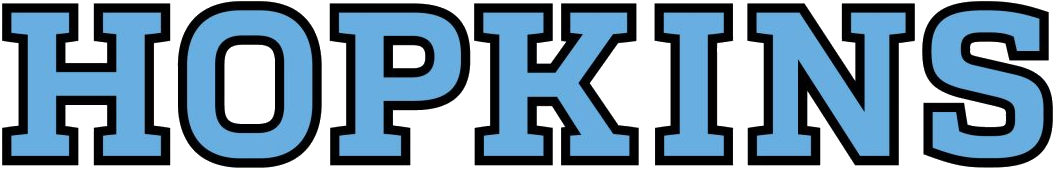
- Founded: 1976; 50 years ago
- University: Johns Hopkins University
- Head coach: Tim McCormack (since 2023 season)
- Stadium: Homewood Field (capacity: 8,500)
- Location: Baltimore, Maryland
- Conference: Big Ten
- Colors: Hopkins blue and black

NCAA Tournament Final Fours
- 1988*, 1993*, 1994*, 1995*, 1997*, 2026

NCAA Tournament Quarterfinals
- 1987*, 1988*, 1989*, 1990*, 1993*, 1994*, 1995*, 1997*, 1998*, 2007, 2026

NCAA Tournament appearances
- 1987*, 1988*, 1989*, 1990*, 1993*, 1994*, 1995*, 1997*, 1998*, 2004, 2005, 2007, 2014, 2015, 2016, 2018, 2019, 2021, 2022, 2023, 2024, 2025, 2026

Conference Tournament championships
- 1989, 1990

Conference regular season championships
- 1988, 1989, 1990, 1991, 1993, 1994, 1995, 1997, 1998; *Division III

The Johns Hopkins Blue Jays Women's Lacrosse team represents Johns Hopkins University in the National Collegiate Athletic Association (NCAA) Division I women's college lacrosse competition. The Blue Jays play their home games at Homewood Field located on the school's Homewood campus in Baltimore, Maryland. Johns Hopkins are members of the Big Ten Conference and are coached by Tim McCormack.

== History ==
From the team's inception in 1976 through the 1998 season, the Blue Jays women competed at the NCAA Division III level. They switched to Division I starting in the 1999 season. The Blue Jays were members of the American Lacrosse Conference until its dissolution in 2014, competed as an independent during the 2015 and 2016 seasons, and officially joined the Big Ten on July 1, 2016, making the 2017 season the first season of Big Ten Conference play for the Blue Jays. The Blue Jays became the seventh women's lacrosse program in the conference.

The Blue Jays made NCAA tournament appearances in 2004, 2005, 2007, 2014, 2015, 2016, 2018, 2019, 2021, 2022, 2023, 2024, 2025, and 2026.

In 2007, Johns Hopkins advanced to the NCAA tournament quarterfinals.

In 2016, the Blue Jays qualified for the NCAA tournament Sweet 16.

On April 18, 2021, Janine Tucker became just the 9th NCAA Division 1 Women's Lacrosse Coach to win 300 games with a 13–11 win at Penn State.

In June 2022, Tim McCormack was named as head coach of Johns Hopkins women's lacrosse. He replaced long-time coach Janine Tucker, who coached the team for 29 years.

In 2023, in McCormack's first year as head coach the Blue Jays made the NCAA tournament Sweet 16, losing to Syracuse 25-8.

In 2024, Johns Hopkins women's lacrosse made the NCAA tournament Sweet 16, losing to #6 Yale 9-7 in the second round.

In 2025, the Blue Jays made the NCAA Sweet 16, losing to #8 Princeton 18-12 in the second round.

In 2026, Johns Hopkins made the NCAA tournament semifinals following wins over UAlbany 21-7 in the first round and #14 Army 21-13 in the Sweet 16 (second round) and #5 Stony Brook 13-12 in the quarterfinals on a last second goal. This season marked the team's first NCAA Division I semifinals appearance in program history and their first NCAA quarterfinals appearance since 2007.

== Season results ==
The following is a list of Johns Hopkins's results by season since the institution of NCAA Division I in 1982:

Season	Coach	Overall	Conference	Standing	Postseason
Micul Ann Morse (Independent) (1976–1982)
1982	Micul Ann Morse	7–13–1			
Micul Ann Morse:		38–59–4 (.396)			
Sally Beth Anderson (Independent) (1983–1987)
1983	Sally Beth Anderson	6–9			
1984	Sally Beth Anderson	7–7			
1985	Sally Beth Anderson	9–8			
1986	Sally Beth Anderson	8–9			
1987	Sally Beth Anderson	13–5			NCAA Division III Quarterfinals
Sally Beth Anderson (Middle Atlantic Conference West) (1988–1993)
1988	Sally Beth Anderson	14–4	4–0	1st	NCAA Division III Final Four
1989	Sally Beth Anderson	14–2	3–1	1st	NCAA Division III Quarterfinals
1990	Sally Beth Anderson	9–5	4–0	1st	NCAA Division III Quarterfinals
1991	Sally Beth Anderson	10–5	4–1	1st	
1992	Sally Beth Anderson	9–5	3–2		
1993	Sally Beth Anderson	13–3	5–0	1st	NCAA Division III Final Four
Sally Beth Anderson:		112–62 (.644)	23–4 (.852)		
Janine Tucker (Centennial Conference) (1994–1998)
1994	Janine Tucker	16–1	10–0	1st	NCAA Division III Final Four
1995	Janine Tucker	15–3	10–0	1st	NCAA Division III Final Four
1996	Janine Tucker	11–5	9–1	2nd	
1997	Janine Tucker	12–4	10–0	1st	NCAA Division III Final Four
1998	Janine Tucker	14–3	10–0	1st	NCAA Division III Quarterfinals
Janine Tucker (Independent) (1999–2001)
1999	Janine Tucker	10–4			
2000	Janine Tucker	12–6			ECAC Division I Runner-Up
2001	Janine Tucker	11–6			ECAC Division I Champion
Janine Tucker (American Lacrosse Conference) (2002–2014)
2002	Janine Tucker	10–8	4–2		ECAC Division I Runner-Up
2003	Janine Tucker	11–5	4–2		
2004	Janine Tucker	12–5	4–2		NCAA Division I First Round
2005	Janine Tucker	11–6	3–3	T–3rd	NCAA Division I First Round
2006	Janine Tucker	12–4	3–2	3rd	
2007	Janine Tucker	12–8	2–2	3rd	NCAA Division I Quarterfinals
2008	Janine Tucker	8–9	2–2	3rd	
2009	Janine Tucker	5–12	0–4	5th	
2010	Janine Tucker	10–7	3–2	3rd	
2011	Janine Tucker	9–8	1–4	T–5th	
2012	Janine Tucker	9–9	1–4	T–4th	
2013	Janine Tucker	10–7	2–3	4th	
2014	Janine Tucker	15–5	3–3	T–3rd	NCAA Division I First Round
Janine Tucker (Independent) (2015–2016)
2015	Janine Tucker	14–4			NCAA Division I First Round
2016	Janine Tucker	11–8			NCAA Division I Second Round
Janine Tucker (Big Ten Conference) (2017–2022)
2017	Janine Tucker	11–7	3–3	4th	
2018	Janine Tucker	10–9	3–3	T–3rd	NCAA Division I First Round
2019	Janine Tucker	10–8	2–4	5th	NCAA Division I First Round
2020	Janine Tucker	4–3	0–0	†	†
2021	Janine Tucker	8–7	7–5	T-2nd	NCAA Division I First Round
2022	Janine Tucker	10-9	2-4	T-4th	NCAA Division I First Round
Janine Tucker:		313–180 (.635)	98-55 (.641)		
Tim McCormack (Big Ten Conference) (2023–Present)
2023	Tim McCormack	9-9	4-2	T-2nd	NCAA Division I Second Round
2024	Tim McCormack	12-8	2-4	5	NCAA Division I Second Round
2025	Tim McCormack	13-7	5-3	T-3rd	NCAA Division I Second Round
2026	Tim McCormack	17-4	6-2	3rd	NCAA Division I Semifinal
Tim McCormack:		51-28 (.646)	17-11 (.607)		
Total:		514–329–4 (.609)			
National champion Postseason invitational champion Conference regular season champion Conference regular season and conference tournament champion Division regular season champion Division regular season and conference tournament champion Conference tournament champion

†NCAA canceled 2020 collegiate activities due to the COVID-19 pandemic.
