= Bryant Bulldogs =

Intercollegiate sports teams of Bryant University

Coordinates: 41.92545°N 71.53241°W

- University: Bryant University
- Nickname: Bulldogs
- NCAA: Division I (FCS)
- Conference: America East (primary); CAA Football; CAA (rowing); ECC (bowling); Big South (men's tennis); OVC (golf & women's tennis)
- Athletic director: Bill Smith
- Location: Smithfield, Rhode Island
- Varsity teams: 25
- Football stadium: Beirne Stadium
- Basketball arena: Chace Athletic Center
- Baseball stadium: Conaty Park
- Colors: Black and gold
- Mascot: Tupper
- Website: bryantbulldogs.com
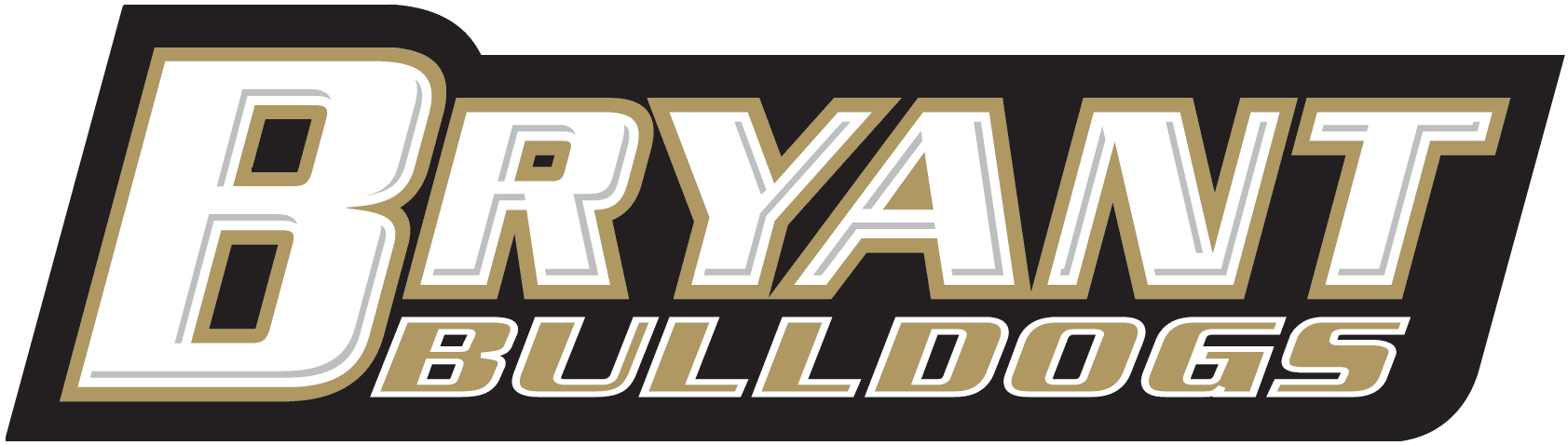

The Bryant Bulldogs are the athletic teams representing Bryant University in Smithfield, Rhode Island. As of July 1, 2022, the Bulldogs compete in most National Collegiate Athletic Association (NCAA) Division I sports as members of the America East Conference (AmEast). The move to the AmEast followed a 14-year tenure in the Northeast Conference (NEC), which it joined in 2008 when it began a transition from NCAA Division II to Division I. Bryant's largest rivalry during its Division II years was Bentley College, both founders of the Northeast-10 Conference (NE-10) and both have prominent business programs. Bryant University athletics started out as a member of the National Association of Intercollegiate Athletics (NAIA) before it transitioned into Division II. Bryant competed in the NE-10 from the conference's founding in 1980 until 2008 when the university began the transition to Division I. In 2012, Bryant became a full Division I member.

== History ==
=== The beginning: The Providence years ===
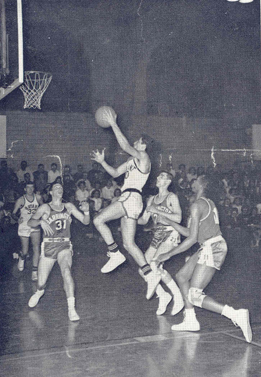
Bryant playoff game during the 1966 season

Bryant University originally competed independently before the NCAA had classifications. The first teams were men's basketball and rowing, which started in 1896. The first women's team was women's basketball. When the NCAA began more strict classifications Bryant moved to the NAIA in 1963. During Bryant's tenure in the NAIA, it competed as an independent school. The university's tenure in the NAIA saw the men's basketball team record an undefeated regular season, going 22–0 before losing the final two games of the 1966-67 season in the District 32 Tournament. The 22-2 overall record was the team's best during the NAIA years. The move to Division II was partly because of the new campus, and the school's goals.

During their NAIA playing years, they were known as the Indians, and were located in Providence, Rhode Island, near Brown University. The school's largest rivalry at the time was Salem State College. The school was still a small business school, who was still only known on a local level. In 1976 the college left the NAIA In 1977 the college exited the NAIA and became a member of the NCAA at the Division II level. From there they became a charter member of the Northeast-10 Conference when the conference formed in 1979 and began play in 1980.

=== The Charter Years: Move to Division II ===
Student spirit group

In 1980 Bryant was one of the charter members of the Northeast-10. Bryant along with other New England schools helped create a Division II conference that could succeed on and off the playing field and create rivalries at the same time. With the conference affiliation Bryant was able to keep its closest present-day rival Bentley College Falcons close both academically and athletically.

The university used the Indians nickname and logos since the inception of the athletics program in 1896 until 1995.

Entering the 2000s (decade) the university has won 40 conference championships; and the President's Cup 4 times in 2004, 2005, and 2007 and in their last season as a Division II member in 2008. They lost in 2006 by 1 point to Stonehill College. In their last year of competition in Division II and in the Northeast-10, Bryant won the President's Cup by over 30 points, and sent 19 out of the 22 teams into the NCAA playoffs. They also amassed a record of 292-65-6 throughout the entire year.

The 2000s (decade) also saw the injection of many new coaches at the university. Before the move to Division I they had signed four former Division I coaches from Duke University, Iowa State University, Wagner College, and UNLV. These moves have been noted as being one of the reasons that Bryant athletics have had such a successful run. This run has also brought on the exploratory commission to explore the move to Division I.

=== Move to Division I ===
On October 18, 2007, Bryant announced it would join the Northeast Conference. The move had Bryant participating as a Division I institution starting in 2008. The NCAA voted in 2012 to make the university a full member, which would allow Bryant to be eligible for NCAA Division I member postseason tournament play as well as have voting rights for its conference.

=== Move to the America East ===
On March 29, 2022, Bryant was announced as a new member of the America East Conference (AmEast), effective that July 1. It is the only private school in the AmEast following the 2022 departure of Hartford, which started a transition from D-I to Division III in 2021 and left to spend one year as a D-I independent before joining the D-III Commonwealth Coast Conference, now known as the Conference of New England, in 2023.

Bryant fields seven varsity teams in sports that the AmEast does not sponsor. On the same day Bryant's arrival in the AmEast was announced, the Big South Conference announced that Bryant would become a football-only member of that conference effective with the 2022 season. A month before Bryant was announced as a new Big South football member, that conference had announced that it would merge its football membership with that of the Ohio Valley Conference in 2023. The alliance was revealed as the Big South–OVC Football Association in summer 2023, Shortly before Bryant began what would prove to be its only season in the Big South–OVC alliance, it announced a move to CAA Football, the technically separate football league operated by the Coastal Athletic Association, for 2024 and beyond.

In June 2022, Bryant's five remaining varsity teams found conference homes. The Southland Conference (SLC) brought the Bulldogs in as members in men's & women's golf and tennis. Bowling, a women-only sport added for 2022–23, joined the Division II East Coast Conference, making it the only NCAA Division I member at that time to compete in any sport as a member of a Division II conference. This arrangement is possible because the NCAA does not split that sport into divisions, currently holding a single championship event open to members of all three divisions. Also, scholarship limits in bowling are identical in Divisions I and II. (Note: A second Division I school, Mount St. Mary's, joined the Division II Conference Carolinas in July 2025 as a member in women's flag football, currently a non-NCAA sport but expected to become part of the NCAA Emerging Sports for Women program in 2026–27.)

All of Bryant's SLC sports would leave that conference by July 2025. First, men's and women's golf, plus women's tennis, joined the Ohio Valley Conference in July 2024. A year later, men's tennis moved to the Big South Conference. Also in 2025, women's rowing joined the multi-sports CAA.

== Sports sponsored ==
A member of the America East Conference, Bryant University sponsors teams in 25 NCAA-sanctioned sports, 11 for men and 14 for women:

America East Conference logo in Bryant's colors

Men's sports	Women's sports
Baseball	Basketball
Basketball	Bowling
Cross country	Cross country
Football	Field hockey
Golf	Golf
Lacrosse	Lacrosse
Soccer	Rowing
Swimming & diving	Soccer
Tennis	Softball
Track & field^{†}	Swimming & diving
	Tennis
	Track & field^{†}
	Volleyball
† – Track and field includes both indoor and outdoor.

== Facilities ==
=== Beirne Stadium ===
Bulldog Stadium was completed in 1999 and has a seating capacity of 5,500 with a 4,200-seat permanent structure and press box on the home side of the field and 1,300 additional seats on the visitor's side. Bulldog Stadium was renamed Beirne Stadium September 24, 2016. In addition to serving as the home of Bryant Football, Beirne Stadium also serves as the home venue to the school's men's and women's lacrosse and men's and women's soccer teams. It has also been the host of Rhode Island's high school state championship games.

=== Conaty Park ===
Conaty Park, the home of Bryant's baseball program, is located in the northwest section of the campus near the other athletic facilities. The field has dimensions 330' down the left and right field lines, 385' to the right and left center field gaps and 400' to center field. It is equipped with step down dug outs, each with a connected clubhouse space. It also has bullpens down each line with two mounds and a hitting cage down the left field line just outside of the fence next to the bullpen. In addition to hosting several Northeast-10 Conference tournament games, the Bryant Baseball Complex hosted the 2004 NCAA Division II Baseball Northeast Regional Championship, won by the Bulldogs.

=== Other facilities ===
The Chace Wellness Center is a 31,000-square-foot (2,900 m^{2}) student recreation center that augments the current gymnasium and Multipurpose Activity Center (MAC). The center includes workout space, a 8,000-square-foot (740 m^{2}) fitness center, and an aerobic and martial arts studio. The Elizabeth & Malcolm Natatorium is an olympic-size pool originally constructed with the additions to the current Wellness and Athletic Center. The pool had only recreational use until the winter of 2005 when Bryant added men's and women's swim teams as a varsity sport. The natatorium features six lanes equipped with a scoreboard, seating area, and sound system.

The Bryant Track and Turf Complex was built in 2005 and is the home venue for the men's and women's track & field teams. The facility also hosts soccer, field hockey and lacrosse games in addition to being used as the football practice field. The facility has a bleacher seating section with a capacity of 1,000 fans. Another valuable addition was the lights surrounding the track.

== Championships ==
=== Northeast Conference ===
Conference championships:

- Baseball: 2013, 2014, 2016
- Basketball (men's): 2022, 2025
- Lacrosse (men's): 2012, 2013, 2014, 2015, 2017, 2021
- Golf: 2014, 2017
- Lacrosse (women's): 2014, 2017
- Softball: 2014, 2026
- Tennis (men's): 2014, 2015, 2016, 2017, 2018, 2019
- Swim and Dive (men’s): 2021, 2022
- Swim and Dive (women’s): 2018,2019,2020,2021,2022

=== Northeast-10 history ===
While competing as a charter member of the Northeast-10 conference from 1980 until 2008 the school won the President's Cup, awarded to the best overall athletic team in the NE-10, eight times. Bryant also finished in second five times and third three times. Considered to be one of the most successful teams in Northeast-10 History Bryant has won 93 conference championships. In the 2007-2008 school year, the university won 9 conference championships. During its Division II years, the university sponsored 22 of 23 sports that the Northeast-10 Conference offered.

Sport	Conf. titles	Last title
Golf	20	2005
Volleyball	10	2007
Tennis (w)	9	2008
Baseball	9	2012
Tennis (m)	6	2008
Lacrosse (m)	4	2021
Cross Country	4	1996
Softball	3	2006
Basketball (w)	3	1989
Field Hockey	2	2003
Football	2	2007
Soccer (w)	2	2007
Soccer (m)	1	1988
Lacrosse (w)	1	1999
Track and Field	1	1993
Basketball (m)	0	----
Swimming & Diving	2	2018, 2019

== Mascot ==
The Bulldog logo became the official new logo and mascot of the university after a 1995 campus-wide vote. The school now has a living mascot and a costumed mascot to represent the bulldogs mascot and university athletics. Bryant has also used two bulldog logos as they did during the Indian years; first using a realistic bulldog's head inside a diamond design, followed by the current design in 2004. The change came when Bryant went from being a college to a university.

Ironclad Tupper I, or Tupper for short, was an English bulldog purchased by former Bryant University President Ron Machtley and his wife, Kati. The Machtleys gave the dog to the school to honor the class of 2010's senior class gift campaign, which exceeded its goals and set two senior class gift records. Tupper served as Bryant University's mascot and attended campus events, as well as performed community service as a therapy dog. He was the first live bulldog mascot in the university's history and received an honorary degree at 2010 commencement for "character and obedience." Tupper died on December 6, 2017, of an apparent stroke during the Festival of Lights celebration.

Tupper II was introduced to the university community on April 12, 2018. Tupper II, known as Tupper for short, serves as Bryant University's mascot and attends campus events. According to former President Ron Machtley, "he has all the qualities and traits of the best damn bulldog in the country.”
