= Ann Elliott Whidden =

American lacrosse player and coach

Current position
- Title: Head coach
- Team: Colorado
- Conference: Big 12
- Record: 146-79 (.649)

Biographical details
- Born: September 6, 1984 (age 42); Shaker Heights, Ohio
- Education: Northwestern University

Playing career
- 2004–2007: Northwestern
- Position: Defender

Coaching career (HC unless noted)
- 2009–2012: Northwestern (Assistant Coach)
- 2012–present: Colorado

Accomplishments and honors

Championships
- Big 12 Tournament (2026); Pac-12 Regular Season (2018); NCAA National Champion (2005, 2006, 2007) (as player at Northwestern); NCAA National Champion (2009, 2011, 2012) (as assistant coach at Northwestern)

Awards
- Big 12 Coach of the Year (2026); Pac-12 Coach of the Year (2018)

Ann Elliott Whidden (born 1984), née Ann Michelle Elliott, is an American college lacrosse coach and former player. She is the head coach of the Colorado Buffaloes women's lacrosse team at the University of Colorado Boulder. Elliott was an All-American defender for the Northwestern Wildcats women's lacrosse team of Northwestern University, where she was a member of four NCAA championship teams. She later served as an assistant coach at Northwestern, winning two additional NCAA championships.

== Playing career ==
During her collegiate playing career, Ann Elliott Whidden was a three-year starter for the Northwestern Wildcats women's lacrosse team from 2004 to 2007. During her senior season in 2007, she earned third-team All-American honors from Inside Lacrosse. As a member of the Wildcats, Whidden won three consecutive NCAA national championships in 2005, 2006, and 2007. As a senior, she served as a team captain and was part of a defensive unit that allowed an NCAA-low 6.1 goals per game. In 2022, she was inducted into the Ohio Lacrosse Hall of Fame for her accomplishments as a player at both the high school and collegiate levels.

== Coaching career ==
On March 26, 2012, the University of Colorado Boulder announced that Ann Elliott Whidden had been named the first head coach of the newly established Buffaloes women's lacrosse program. Before accepting the position, she spent four seasons on the coaching staff at Northwestern University. She served as an assistant coach from 2009 to 2011 before being promoted to associate coach for the 2012 season, her final year with the program. During her tenure at Northwestern, the Wildcats won three National Collegiate Athletic Association (NCAA) national championships in 2009, 2011, and 2012.

Whidden served as an assistant coach for two United States national team championship teams. In 2019, she was an assistant coach for the U.S. Women's U19 National Team, which won the gold medal at the 2019 World Lacrosse Women's U19 Championship. She also served as an assistant coach for the U.S. Women's U20 National Team, which won the gold medal at the 2024 World Lacrosse Women's U20 Championship.

The Colorado women's lacrosse team began competition on February 22, 2014. Whidden's first recruiting class consisted of 23 players, including four US Lacrosse high school All-America selections, three Academic All-America selections, and six all-state honorees.

In the inaugural season of the Colorado women's lacrosse program in 2014, Whidden led a roster composed primarily of freshmen to an 11–8 record. Colorado later made three consecutive appearances in the NCAA Division I Women's Lacrosse Championship from 2017 to 2019. The program earned its first NCAA tournament victory in 2018, defeating the Jacksonville Dolphins team in the first round before losing to the Florida Gators team in the second round.

In 2026, Colorado won its first Big 12 tournament championship, defeating Florida in the championship game and earning the conference's automatic bid to the NCAA tournament. The Buffaloes subsequently defeated Jacksonville and Denver to advance to the program's first NCAA quarterfinal appearance, where they lost to Northwestern. Through the conclusion of the 2026 season, Colorado had compiled a 143–79 record under Whidden's leadership.

== Personal ==
Ann Elliott Whidden (née Elliott) was born in 1984 and grew up in Shaker Heights, Ohio, where she attended Shaker Heights High School. She graduated from Northwestern University in 2007 with a bachelor's degree in radio, television, and film. She married Nick Whidden in 2017. The couple has twins, a daughter and a son, who were born in May 2020.

== Head coaching record ==
=== Women's lacrosse ===
Record table
Season	Team	Overall	Conference	Standing	Postseason
Colorado Buffaloes (Mountain Pacific Sports Federation) (2014–2017)
2014	Colorado	11–8	6–3	3rd	
2015	Colorado	11–7	5–4	4th	
2016	Colorado	13–5	7–2	3rd	
2017	Colorado	16–4	7–1	2nd	NCAA First Round
Colorado Buffaloes (Pac-12 Conference) (2018–2024)
2018	Colorado	14–6	9–1	1st	NCAA Second Round
2019	Colorado	11–8	8–2	2nd	NCAA Second Round
2020	Colorado	3–2	1–0		
2021	Colorado	8–7	4–3	3rd	
2022	Colorado	11–6	5–5	4th	
2023	Colorado	11–8	7–3	3rd	
2024	Colorado	13–6	5–2	3rd	
Colorado Buffaloes (Big 12 Conference) (2025–present)
2025	Colorado	8–8	4–1	2nd	
2026	Colorado	16–4	4–1	2nd	NCAA Quarterfinals
Colorado:		146–79 (.649)	72–28 (.720)		
Total:		146–79 (.649)			
National champion Postseason invitational champion Conference regular season champion Conference regular season and conference tournament champion Division regular season champion Division regular season and conference tournament champion Conference tournament champion
