= Ashley Humphrey =

American lacrosse player (born 2002)

Ashley Annabelle Humphrey (born August 22, 2002) is an American lacrosse player. The NCAA's all-time assist leader, she played college lacrosse for the Stanford Cardinal and the North Carolina Tar Heels. She helped lead the Tar Heels to the 2025 national championship.

== Early life ==
Humphrey grew up in Darien, Connecticut, one of four children born to Sarah and John Humphrey. She has two sisters, Nicole and Chloe, and a brother, Brett. Humphrey began playing lacrosse when she was eight. She won two Connecticut state titles at Darien High School and was twice named All-American. She was ranked by Inside Lacrosse as the fourth-best recruit of the 2020 class.

== College career ==
Humphrey decided to redshirt her freshman season with the Stanford Cardinal during the COVID-19 pandemic in 2021. In her debut season in 2022, Humphrey broke the NCAA single-season record with 88 assists. She made a program-record single-game 9 assists in the Pac-12 Conference title game, an 18–12 win against Arizona State. The next season saw Humphrey again lead the Pac-12 with 42 assists. In two seasons on the Farm, she was named the Pac-12 Freshman of the Year, first-team All-Pac-12 two times, and USA Lacrosse honorable mention All-American two times.

After graduating from Stanford, Humphrey transferred to the North Carolina Tar Heels in 2024. She led the Tar Heels with 38 assists but missed the team's NCAA tournament game where they lost to Florida. In the 2025 season, she broke her own NCAA single-season record with 90 assists and became the NCAA's all-time career assist leader. With sisters Nicole and Chloe, she helped lead the Tar Heels to an undefeated 22–0 record, the Atlantic Coast Conference regular-season and tournament titles, and the program's fourth NCAA championship. She had 4 assists in the national title game, winning 12–8 against Northwestern. She was named first-team All-American and was one of five finalists for the Tewaaraton Award, which went to her sister Chloe.
