= Denver Pioneers women's lacrosse =

- Founded: 1999; 27 years ago
- University: University of Denver
- Head coach: Liza Kelly (20th season)
- Stadium: Peter Barton Lacrosse Stadium (capacity: 2,000)
- Location: Denver, Colorado
- Conference: Big East Conference
- Nickname: Pioneers
- Colors: Crimson and gold

NCAA Tournament Final Fours
- 2023

NCAA Tournament Quarterfinals
- 2019, 2023

NCAA Tournament appearances
- 2013, 2014, 2018, 2019, 2021, 2022, 2023, 2024, 2025, 2026

Conference Tournament championships
- 2014, 2021, 2022, 2023, 2024, 2025, 2026

Conference regular season championships
- 2006, 2007, 2008, 2010, 2013, 2014, 2019, 2021, 2022, 2023, 2024, 2025, 2026

The Denver Pioneers women's lacrosse team is an NCAA Division I college lacrosse team representing the University of Denver as part of the Big East Conference. They play their home games at Peter Barton Lacrosse Stadium in Denver, Colorado.

== History ==
The Pioneers women's lacrosse team began play in the 1999 season, finishing with a 4–9 record in their inaugural season.

The Pioneers were members of the MPSF conference from 2004 to 2016. From 2017 to present, Denver has been a member of the Big East Conference in women's lacrosse.

Denver has appeared in the NCAA tournament in 2013, 2014, 2018, 2019, 2021, 2022, 2023, 2024, 2025, and 2026.

In the 2013 NCAA tournament, the Pioneers, defeated Jacksonville in the first round and lost to Florida in the second round (Sweet 16). In the 2014 NCAA tournament, Denver again beat Jacksonville in the first round and lost to Florida in the second round. In the 2018 NCAA tournament, the Pioneers defeated High Point in the first round and lost to Maryland in the second round.

In the 2019 NCAA tournament, Denver broke through and made the NCAA quarterfinals after wins over USC and Michigan before losing to Maryland in the Elite 8.

After the 2020 tournament was cancelled, the Pioneers appeared in the 2021 NCAA tournament and lost in the second round to Northwestern. In the 2022 NCAA tournament, the Pioneers lost to Boston College in the second round.

In the 2023 NCAA tournament, Denver had a historic run to the NCAA Final Four. The Pioneers defeated USC, Albany (NY), and North Carolina before losing to eventual NCAA champion Northwestern.

After their Final Four appearance in 2023, Denver lost in the second round of the 2024 NCAA tournament, again eliminated by Northwestern.

In the 2025 NCAA tournament, Denver was a first-round exit to Stanford.

== Individual career records ==
Record	Amount	Player	Years
Goals	202 (2)	Julia Gilbert, Ali Flury	2020–24; 2007–10
Assists	192	Jill Remenapp	2012–15
Points	302	Jill Remenapp	2012–15
Ground balls	182	Sam Thacker	2020–24
Draw controls	390	Abby Jenkins	2021–24
Caused turnovers	186	Sam Thacker	2020–24
Saves	575	Steph Schneider	2002–05
Save %*	.605	Gemma McDonald	1997–99
GAA**	7.12	Lexi Gwaku	2025–Present

*Minimum 100 saves
**Minimum 1000 minutes

== Individual single-season records ==
Record	Amount	Player	Year
Goals	73	Olivia Ripple	2026
Assists	74	Jill Remenapp	2013
Points	113	Jill Remenapp	2013
Ground balls	66	Tanya Fuchs	2006
Draw controls	134	Abby Jenkins	2023
Caused turnovers	70	Kate Henrich	2013
Saves	242	Steph Schneider	2004
Save %*	.557	Sarah Hazard	2002
GAA**	6.43	Emelia Bohi	2023

*Minimum 100 saves
**Minimum 500 minutes

== Individual game records ==
Record	Amount	Player	Date
Goals	10	Olivia Ripple	4/2/25
Assists	9	Jill Remenapp	4/21/13
Points	13	Kristie Leggio	3/27/07
Ground balls	14	Tanya Fuchs	4/9/05
Draw controls	17	Alex Dorr	4/19/25
Caused turnovers	8	Layne Voorhees	4/28/17
Saves	26	Steph Schneider	2/22/04

== Seasons ==
Record table
Season	Coach	Overall	Conference	Standing	Postseason
NCAA Division I (NCAA DI Independent) (1999–2001)
1999	Deanna Blood	4–9	N/A	N/A	
2000	Deanna Blood	3–11	N/A	N/A	
2001	Abby Burbank	3–9	N/A	N/A	
NCAA Division I (Mountain Pacific Lacrosse League) (2002–2003)
2002	Abby Burbank	6–11	3–5	4th	
2003	Abby Burbank	8–6	2–2	3rd	
NCAA Division I (Mountain Pacific Sports Federation) (2004–2016)
2004	Cathy Reese	7–12	2–2	3rd	
2005	Cathy Reese	8–12	3–2	3rd	
2006	Cathy Reese	15–5	4–1	T-1st	
2007	Liza Kelly	16–3	5–0	1st	
2008	Liza Kelly	13–6	5–0	1st	
2009	Liza Kelly	10–8	4–2	T-2nd	
2010	Liza Kelly	13–5	6–0	1st	
2011	Liza Kelly	7–11	5–1	3rd	
2012	Liza Kelly	12–3	6–1	2nd	
2013	Liza Kelly	18–3	8–0	1st	NCAA Second Round
2014	Liza Kelly	19–2	9–0	1st	NCAA Second Round
2015	Liza Kelly	13–5	7–2	3rd	
2016	Liza Kelly	9–9	5–4	5th	
NCAA Division I (Big East Conference) (2017–present)
2017	Liza Kelly	14–4	7–2	T-2nd	
2018	Liza Kelly	13–7	6–3	T-3rd	NCAA Second Round
2019	Liza Kelly	16–4	5–0	1st	NCAA Quarterfinals
2020	Liza Kelly	7–1	0–0	N/A	
2021	Liza Kelly	16–2	10–0	1st	NCAA Second Round
2022	Liza Kelly	18–3	5–0	1st	NCAA Second Round
2023	Liza Kelly	22–1	6–0	1st	NCAA Semifinals
2024	Liza Kelly	16–4	5–0	1st	NCAA Second Round
2025	Liza Kelly	14–6	5–1	1st	NCAA First Round
2026	Liza Kelly	16–4	6–0	1st	NCAA Second Round
Total:		336–166 (.669)			
National champion Postseason invitational champion Conference regular season champion Conference regular season and conference tournament champion Division regular season champion Division regular season and conference tournament champion Conference tournament champion

== Postseason Results ==
The Eagles have appeared in 10 NCAA tournaments. Their postseason record is 12–10.

Year	Seed	Round	Opponent	Score
2013	–	First Round; Second Round	Jacksonville #5 Florida	W, 14–7; L, 5–16
2014	–	First Round; Second Round	Jacksonville #4 Florida	W, 12–8; L, 9–19
2018	–	First Round; Second Round	High Point #1 Maryland	W, 19–10; L, 4–15
2019	–	First Round; Second Round; Quarterfinals	USC #8 Michigan #1 Maryland	W (OT), 11–10; W, 9–5; L, 8–17
2021	–	First Round; Second Round	Stanford #2 Northwestern	W, 15–13; L, 4–19
2022	–	First Round; Second Round	Vermont #3 Boston College	W, 16–3; L, 8–13
2023	#5	First Round; Second Round; Quarterfinals; Semifinals	USC; UAlbany #4 North Carolina #1 Northwestern	W, 10–7; W, 8–6; W, 5–4; L, 7–15
2024	–	First Round; Second Round	Stanford #1 Northwestern	W, 13–12; L, 4–17
2025	–	First Round	Stanford	L, 4–10
2026	–	First Round; Second Round	Florida #8 Colorado	W, 18–8; L, 9–11
