= Stanford Cardinal women's lacrosse =

Lacrosse team

- Founded: 1995; 31 years ago
- University: Stanford University
- Head coach: Danielle Spencer (7th season)
- Stadium: Laird Q. Cagan Stadium (capacity: 2952)
- Location: Palo Alto, California
- Conference: Atlantic Coast Conference
- Nickname: Cardinal
- Colors: Cardinal and white

NCAA Tournament Quarterfinals
- 2026

NCAA Tournament appearances
- 2006, 2010, 2011, 2013, 2014, 2015, 2016, 2018, 2019, 2021, 2022, 2024, 2025, 2026

Conference Tournament championships
- 1995, 1998, 1999, 2000, 2001, 2002, 2003, 2005, 2006, 2007, 2008, 2009, 2010, 2011, 2013, 2015, 2018, 2024

Conference regular season championships
- 1995, 1998, 1999, 2000, 2001, 2002, 2003, 2004, 2005, 2006, 2008, 2011, 2015, 2024

The Stanford Cardinal women's lacrosse team is an NCAA Division I college lacrosse team representing Stanford University as part of the Atlantic Coast Conference. They play their home games at Laird Q. Cagan Stadium in Stanford, California. The Cardinal are led by head coach Danielle Spencer.

== Head coach ==
The Cardinal are currently led by head coach Danielle Spencer, the head coach of Stanford women's lacrosse since the 2020 season. A four-year standout at Northwestern from 2006-10, Spencer was a member of three national championship teams (2007-09) and one national runner-up (2010) during her outstanding playing career.

Spencer finished her four seasons with the Wildcats having played in 83 games, making 65 starts. Her career totals ranked among the best in Northwestern's storied history as she departed with 193 goals (7th), 238 points (8th) and 203 draw controls (3rd). The 110 draw controls as a senior were the third-most by a collegiate player in NCAA history at the time. Under Spencer's guidance, Stanford swept the Pac-12 regular-season and tournament titles in three of the last four seasons (2021-22, 2024) while making three NCAA Tournament appearances. In five seasons on The Farm, Spencer has compiled a 49-25 overall record.

Spencer has produced six All-Americans during her tenure on The Farm: Ali Baiocco (2021 IWLCA Second Team), Ashley Humphrey (2022 IWLCA Third Team), Annabel Frist (2024 USA Lacrosse Third Team), Aliya Polisky (2024 USA Lacrosse Honorable Mention), Madison McPherson (2024 ILWomen Honorable Mention) and Lucy Pearson (2024 ILWomen Honorable Mention).

Since Spencer's arrival, multiple players have earned the following major conference awards: Pac-12 Attacker of the Year (2), Pac-12 Defensive Player of the Year (1), Pac-12 Draw Specialist of the Year (2), Pac-12 Goalkeeper of the Year (3) and Pac-12 Freshman of the Year (2).

A three-time conference coach of the year recipient, Spencer owns a 78-44 career overall record in eight seasons as a head coach, which includes a three-year stint at Dartmouth (29-19 overall).

== History ==
The program began play in 1995 under head coach Kay Cowperthwait.

Stanford has made NCAA tournament appearances in 2006, 2010, 2011, 2013, 2014, 2015, 2016, 2018, 2019, 2021, 2022, 2024, 2025, and 2026.

In 2013, 2016, 2025, and 2026, the Cardinal reached the second round of the NCAA tournament.

In 2026, Stanford reached the quarterfinals of the NCAA tournament for the first time in program history.

== Individual career records ==
Record	Amount	Player	Years
Goals	229	Ali Baiocco	2018-22
Assists	130	Ashley Humphrey	2022-23
Points	318	Ali Baiocco	2018-22
Ground balls	173	Laura Shane	2005-08
Draw controls	393	Annabel Frist	2022-26
Caused turnovers	104	Katie Grube	2001-04
Saves	831	Laura Shane	2005–08
GAA	7.25	Kate Horowitz	2003–2006

== Individual single-season records ==
Record	Amount	Player	Year
Goals	65	Aliya Polisky	2025
Assists	88	Ashley Humphrey	2022
Points	124	Ashley Humphrey	2022
Ground balls	69	Hedy Born	1998
Draw controls	138	Annabel Frist	2023
Caused turnovers	38	Rylee Bouvier	2026
Saves	292	Stephanie Tuerk	1998
Save %*	.565	Rachael Neumann	2001
GAA*	7.38	Christina Saikus	2002

*Minimum 250 minutes

== Seasons ==
Record table
Season	Coach	Overall	Conference	Standing	Postseason
NCAA Division I (Western Women's Lacrosse League) (1995–2001)
1995	Kay Cowperthwait	20–5	9-0	1st	
1996	Kay Cowperthwait	10–12	4–7		
1997	Kay Cowperthwait	12-11	7-2	1st	
1998	Heidi Connor Igoe	11-5	8-0	1st	
1999	Heidi Connor Igoe	14-4	7-1	1st	
2000	Heidi Connor Igoe	7-10	3-3	1st	
2001	Michele Uhlfelder	13-5	6-0	1st	
NCAA Division I (Mountain Pacific Lacrosse League) (2002–2003)
2002	Michele Uhlfelder	11-7	8-0	1st	
2003	Michele Uhlfelder	14-4	4-0	1st	
NCAA Division I (Mountain Pacific Sports Federation) (2004–2017)
2004	Michele Uhlfelder	9-9	4-0	1st	
2005	Michele Uhlfelder	13-5	5-0	1st	
2006	Michele Uhlfelder	12-6	4-1	T-1st	NCAA First Round
2007	Michele Uhlfelder	9-8	3-2	3rd	
2008	Michele Uhlfelder; Jennifer Norton/Adam Norton	12-8	3-2	1st	
2009	Amy Bokker	14-4	6-0	2nd	
2010	Amy Bokker	15-6	5-1	2nd	NCAA First Round
2011	Amy Bokker	16-3	6-0	1st	NCAA First Round
2012	Amy Bokker	8-10	5-2	2nd	
2013	Amy Bokker	14-6	6-2	2nd	NCAA Second Round
2014	Amy Bokker	14-5	7-2	2nd	NCAA First Round
2015	Amy Bokker	15-3	9-0	1st	NCAA First Round
2016	Amy Bokker	15-5	8-1	2nd	NCAA Second Round
2017	Amy Bokker	12-6	6-2	T-3rd	
NCAA Division I (Pac-12 Conference) (2018–2024)
2018	Amy Bokker	15-5	8-2	2nd	NCAA First Round
2019	Amy Bokker	13-6	7-3	3rd	NCAA First Round
2020	Danielle Spencer	3-4	1-1		
2021	Danielle Spencer	11-1	7-0	1st	NCAA First Round
2022	Danielle Spencer	12-7	8-2	1st	NCAA First Round
2023	Danielle Spencer	10-8	8-2	2nd	
2024	Danielle Spencer	13-5	7-0	1st	NCAA First Round
NCAA Division I (Atlantic Coast Conference) (2025–present)
2025	Danielle Spencer	15–6	7–2	3rd	NCAA Second Round
2026	Danielle Spencer	17–5	8–2	2nd	NCAA Quarterfinal
Total:		399–194 (.673)			
National champion Postseason invitational champion Conference regular season champion Conference regular season and conference tournament champion Division regular season champion Division regular season and conference tournament champion Conference tournament champion

== Postseason Results ==
The Cardinal have appeared in 14 NCAA tournaments. Their postseason record is 5-14.

Year	Seed	Round	Opponent	Score
2006	--	First Round	#4 Northwestern	L, 9-17
2010	--	First Round	#5 James Madison	L, 8-9
2011	--	First Round	#4 Florida	L, 11-13
2013	--	First Round; Second Round	Notre Dame #2 Northwestern	W, 8-7; L, 8-15
2014	--	First Round	Duke	L, 8-13
2015	--	First Round	Florida	L, 10-15
2016	--	First Round; Second Round	James Madison #5 Southern Cal	W, 9-8; L, 8-14
2018	--	First Round	Virginia	L, 3-12
2019	--	First Round	Notre Dame	L, 9-15
2021	--	First Round	Denver	L, 13-15
2022	--	First Round	Jacksonville	L, 8-20
2024	--	First Round	Denver	L, 12-13
2025	--	First Round; Second Round	Denver #4 Florida	W, 10-4; L, 12-13
2026	--	First Round; Second Round; Quarterfinal	Penn State #7 Michigan #2 North Carolina	W, 7-5; W, 13-12; L, 11-14
