= Colorado Buffaloes women's lacrosse =

College lacrosse team representing the University of Colorado Boulder

- Founded: 2014
- University: University of Colorado Boulder
- Head coach: Ann Elliott Whidden (13th season)
- Stadium: Kittredge Field (capacity: 350)
- Location: Boulder, Colorado
- Conference: Big 12 Conference
- Nickname: Buffaloes
- Colors: Silver, black, and gold

NCAA Tournament Quarterfinals
- 2026

NCAA Tournament appearances
- 2017, 2018, 2019, 2026

Conference Tournament championships
- 2026

Conference regular season championships
- 2018

The Colorado Buffaloes women's lacrosse team is an NCAA Division I college lacrosse team representing University of Colorado Boulder as part of the Big 12 Conference. They play their home games at Kittredge Field in Boulder, Colorado.

== History ==
The Buffaloes fielded their first lacrosse team in 2014. In their first season, they finished with a winning record of 11–8.

In 2017, just the program's fourth season of existence, they started the year 9–0 with highlighted wins over #9 Northwestern, #16 UMass, #14 Denver, and #6 Penn State. The 2017 team would go on to make the 2017 NCAA Division I women's lacrosse tournament, where they would lose in a rematch to UMass in the NCAA tournament first round.

They continued this success by appearing in the NCAA tournament in both 2018 and 2019. In 2018, they defeated Jacksonville 23–18 in the first round before losing to Florida 13–9 in the second round. In 2019, the Buffaloes defeated Dartmouth 16–13 in the first round before a second-round loss to Boston College.

In 2026, Colorado won its first Big 12 tournament championship, defeating Florida 8–6 in the final. The Buffaloes returned to the NCAA tournament for the first time in seven years and went on to their first Elite 8 (Quarterfinals) appearance in program history.

== Individual career records ==
Record	Number	Player	Years
Goals	210	Darby Kiernan	2015–2018
Assists	77	Darby Kiernan	2015–2018
Points	287	Darby Kiernan	2015–2018
Ground balls	160	Kelsie Garrison	2015–2018
Draw controls	369	Darby Kiernan	2015–2018
Saves	606	Paige Soenksen	2014–2017

== Individual single-season records ==
Record	Number	Player	Year
Goals	70	Darby Kiernan	2018
Assists	31	Darby Kiernan	2018
Points	101	Darby Kiernan	2018
Ground balls	58	Sarah Brown	2018
Draw controls	159	Darby Kiernan	2018
Saves	203	Paige Soenksen	2014
Save %	.525	Paige Soenksen	2014

== Seasons ==
Record table
Season	Coach	Overall	Conference	Standing	Postseason
NCAA Division I (Mountain Pacific Sports Federation) (2014–2017)
2014	Ann Elliott Whidden	11–8	6–3	3rd	
2015	Ann Elliott Whidden	11–7	5–4	4th	
2016	Ann Elliott Whidden	13–5	7–2	3rd	
2017	Ann Elliott Whidden	16–4	7–1	2nd	NCAA First Round
NCAA Division I (Pac-12 Conference) (2018–2024)
2018	Ann Elliott Whidden	14–6	9–1	1st	NCAA Second Round
2019	Ann Elliott Whidden	11–8	8–2	2nd	NCAA Second Round
2020	Ann Elliott Whidden	3–2	1–0	2nd	
2021	Ann Elliott Whidden	8–7	4–3	3rd	
2022	Ann Elliott Whidden	11–6	5–5	4th	
2023	Ann Elliott Whidden	11–8	7–3	3rd	
2024	Ann Elliott Whidden	13–6	5–2	3rd	
NCAA Division I (Big 12 Conference) (2025–present)
2025	Ann Elliott Whidden	8–8	4–1	2nd	
2026	Ann Elliott Whidden	16–4	4–1	2nd	NCAA Quarterfinals
Total:		146–79 (.649)			
National champion Postseason invitational champion Conference regular season champion Conference regular season and conference tournament champion Division regular season champion Division regular season and conference tournament champion Conference tournament champion

== Postseason results ==
The Buffaloes have appeared in 4 NCAA tournaments. Their postseason record is 4–4.

Year	Seed	Round	Opponent	Score
2017	–	First Round	UMass	L, 7–13
2018	–	First Round; Second Round	Jacksonville #6 Florida	W, 23–18; L, 9–13
2019	–	First Round; Second Round	Dartmouth #2 Boston College	W, 16–13; L, 9–21
2026	#8	First Round; Second Round; Quarterfinals	Jacksonville; Denver #1 Northwestern	W, 10–9; W, 11–9; L, 12–13
