= 2026 NCAA Division I women's lacrosse tournament =

- Dates: May 8–24, 2026
- Teams: 29
- Finals site: Martin Stadium, Evanston, IL
- Champions: Northwestern (9th title)
- Runner-up: North Carolina (7th title game)
- Semifinalists: Johns Hopkins (1st Final Four); Maryland (29th Final Four)
- Winning coach: Kelly Amonte Hiller (9th title)
- MOP: Chloe Humphrey, North Carolina
- Attendance: 8,316 finals

The 2026 NCAA Division I Women's Lacrosse Championship was the 44th annual single-elimination tournament to help determine the national champion of NCAA Division I women's college lacrosse. The semifinal and national championship rounds were played at Martin Stadium on the campus of Northwestern University in Evanston, Illinois, on May 22 for the semifinals and May 24 for the championship game. All other rounds were played at campus sites, at the home field of the higher-seeded team, from May 8–14. First and second round games were broadcast on ESPN+, quarterfinals and semifinal games were broadcast on ESPNU, and the national championship was broadcast on ESPN.

== Tournament field ==
All NCAA Division I women's lacrosse programs were eligible for this championship, and a total of 29 teams were invited to participate. In total, 15 teams qualified automatically by winning their conference tournaments, while the remaining 14 teams qualified at-large based on their regular-season records.

=== Teams ===
Seed	School	Conference	Berth Type	RPI	Record
1	Northwestern	Big Ten	Automatic	1	15–3
2	North Carolina	ACC	Automatic	2	16–1
3	Maryland	Big Ten	At-large	3	16–3
4	Johns Hopkins	Big Ten	At-large	7	14–4
5	Stony Brook	CAA	Automatic	4	17–2
6	Navy	Patriot	Automatic	5	18–1
7	Michigan	Big Ten	At-large	9	12–6
8	Colorado	Big 12	Automatic	8	14–3
	Army West Point	Patriot	At-large	12	14–4
	Boston College	ACC	At-large	19	9–7
	Clemson	ACC	At-large	14	14–5
	Davidson	Atlantic 10	Automatic	34	15–4
	Denver	Big East	Automatic	13	15–3
	Fairfield	MAAC	Automatic	24	15–3
	Florida	Big 12	At-large	10	15–3
	Jacksonville	ASUN	Automatic	33	13–5
	James Madison	American	Automatic	15	13–6
	Loyola (MD)	Patriot	At-large	23	12–7
	Mercer	Big South	Automatic	55	13–6
	Notre Dame	ACC	At-large	30	12–5
	Penn St.	Big Ten	At-large	18	12–6
	Princeton	Ivy	Automatic	16	11–6
	Rutgers	Big Ten	At-large	20	10–8
	Stanford	ACC	At-large	11	15–4
	Stonehill	NEC	Automatic	72	13–6
	Syracuse	ACC	At-large	6	13–5
	UAlbany	American East	Automatic	35	12–5
	UMass	MAC	Automatic	26	16–2
	Yale	Ivy	At-large	21	13–4

== Bracket ==
=== Tournament bracket ===
First Round; May 8 Regional Campus Sites
James Madison	13
Notre Dame	12
Florida	8
Denver	18
Jacksonville	9
8	Colorado*	10
5	Stony Brook*	19
Stonehill	5
Boston College	10
Yale	4
Army West Point	20
Fairfield	8
UAlbany	7
4	Johns Hopkins*	21
Clemson	19
Davidson	6
Stanford	7
Penn St.	5
Mercer	8
7	Michigan*	18
6	Navy*	17
UMass	16
Syracuse	8
Loyola (MD)	6
Princeton	11
Rutgers	12

Second Round; May 10; Regional Campus Sites
1	Northwestern*	17
James Madison	5
Denver	9
8	Colorado*	11
5	Stony Brook*	10
Boston College	9
Army West Point	13
4	Johns Hopkins*	21
2	North Carolina*	17
Clemson	6
Stanford	13
7	Michigan*	12
6	Navy*	11
Syracuse	10
Rutgers	8
3	Maryland*	11

Quarterfinals; May 14; Campus Sites
1	Northwestern	13
8	Colorado	12
5	Stony Brook	12
4	Johns Hopkins	13
2	North Carolina	14
Stanford	11
6	Navy	10
3	Maryland	14

Semifinals; May 22; Martin Stadium
1	Northwestern	16
4	Johns Hopkins	11
2	North Carolina	16
3	Maryland	6

Final; May 24; Martin Stadium
1	Northwestern	14
2	North Carolina	11

- *First and second round host

== Tournament notes ==
The North Carolina Tar Heels entered the tournament as the reigning national champions, after winning the national championship at the 2025 NCAA tournament. North Carolina entered the tournament as the No. 2 seed in the tournament in its title defense season. However, the No. 1 overall seed in the tournament was earned by Northwestern. The Wildcats defeated the Tar Heels once during the regular season, 17–16 in overtime at Dorrance Field in Chapel Hill, North Carolina. The Wildcats went on to win the Big Ten women's lacrosse tournament finishing the season with a record of 15–3 and securing the number one overall seed in the NCAA tournament.

Analysts and the media considered the national title favorite to be Northwestern, with North Carolina, Maryland and Johns Hopkins being among the other contenders.

Among the top contenders for the national championship in 2026, Northwestern was playing for its ninth title and first since 2023, North Carolina was seeking back-to-back titles, Maryland was playing for its fifteenth title and first since 2019, and John Hopkins was hoping to win its first-ever national title.

Northwestern, North Carolina, and Maryland all earned first-round byes in the tournament.

== Record by Conference ==
Overview of conference performance in the 2026 NCAA Division I women's lacrosse tournament
Conference	# of Bids	Record	Win %	FR	SR	QF	SF	CG	NC
Big Ten	6	11–5	.688	6	5	3	3	1	1
ACC	6	8–6	.571	6	5	2	1	1	–
Patriot	3	3–3	.500	3	2	1	–	–	–
American	1	1–1	.500	1	1	–	–	–	–
CAA	1	2–1	.667	1	1	1	–	–	–
Big 12	2	2–2	.500	2	1	1	–	–	–
ASUN	1	0–1	.000	1	–	–	–	–	–
Atlantic 10	1	0–1	.000	1	–	–	–	–	–
Big East	1	1–1	.500	1	1	–	–	–	–
MAAC	1	0–1	.000	1	–	–	–	–	–
Ivy	2	0–2	.000	2	–	–	–	–	–
American East	1	0–1	.000	1	–	–	–	–	–
Big South	1	0–1	.000	1	–	–	–	–	–
MAC	1	0–1	.000	1	–	–	–	–	–
NEC	1	0–1	.000	1	–	–	–	–	–

== See also ==
- NCAA Division II Women's Lacrosse Championship
- NCAA Division III Women's Lacrosse Championship
- NCAA Division I Men's Lacrosse Championship
