= Kayla Martello =

American lacrosse player (born 2002)

- Born: 2002 (age 22–23)
- Height: 5 ft 8 in (1.73 m)
- Position: Attack
- NCAA team: Boston College Eagles (2021–2024)

Kayla Martello (born 2002) is an American former college lacrosse player for the Boston College Eagles. She won NCAA championships in 2021 and 2024, when she was named the most outstanding player of the tournament.

== Early life ==
Martello was raised in Rockville Centre, New York, with three siblings. Her father, Tom, played college lacrosse at Rutgers, and her brothers at Wesleyan and SUNY Geneseo. She began playing lacrosse at a young age. She attended Sacred Heart Academy, where she captained the lacrosse team for two years and also played basketball and volleyball.

== College career ==
Martello played for the Boston College Eagles from 2021 to 2024. She scored three of her six goals as a freshman over three consecutive rounds of the 2021 NCAA tournament as the Charlotte North-led Eagles went on to become national champions. She contributed 45 goals in her sophomore year, helping the Eagles return to the 2022 NCAA tournament final where they were runners-up. As a junior, she scored 61 goals and was named an Inside Lacrosse All-American. She led the team with three goals and an assist to claim Boston College's first Atlantic Coast Conference championship, and she scored the game-winning goal in the semifinals of the 2023 NCAA tournament, where the Eagles again lost in the final.

Martello recorded a career-high 68 goals in her senior season in 2024. She led the team with six goals in the final to defend their ACC title. Was named USA Lacrosse All American. Martello was nominated for NCAA Women Of the Year. In the final of the 2024 NCAA tournament, Martello scored five goals—including four in a row in the second quarter—to lead Boston College's comeback against Northwestern from 6–0 down in the first quarter to a 14–13 victory. Martello was voted the most outstanding player of the tournament and nominated for the Best Championship Performance ESPY Award.
