= Army Black Knights women's lacrosse =

Lacrosse team

- Founded: 2016; 10 years ago
- University: United States Military Academy
- Head coach: Michelle Tumolo (since 2021 season)
- Stadium: Michie Stadium (capacity: 38,000)
- Location: West Point, NY
- Conference: Patriot League
- Nickname: Black Knights
- Colors: Black, gold, and gray

NCAA Tournament appearances
- 2023, 2025, 2026

Conference regular season championships
- 2026 (Co-Champions)

The Army Black Knights women's lacrosse team is an NCAA Division I college lacrosse team representing the United States Military Academy as part of the Patriot League. They play their home games at Michie Stadium in West Point.

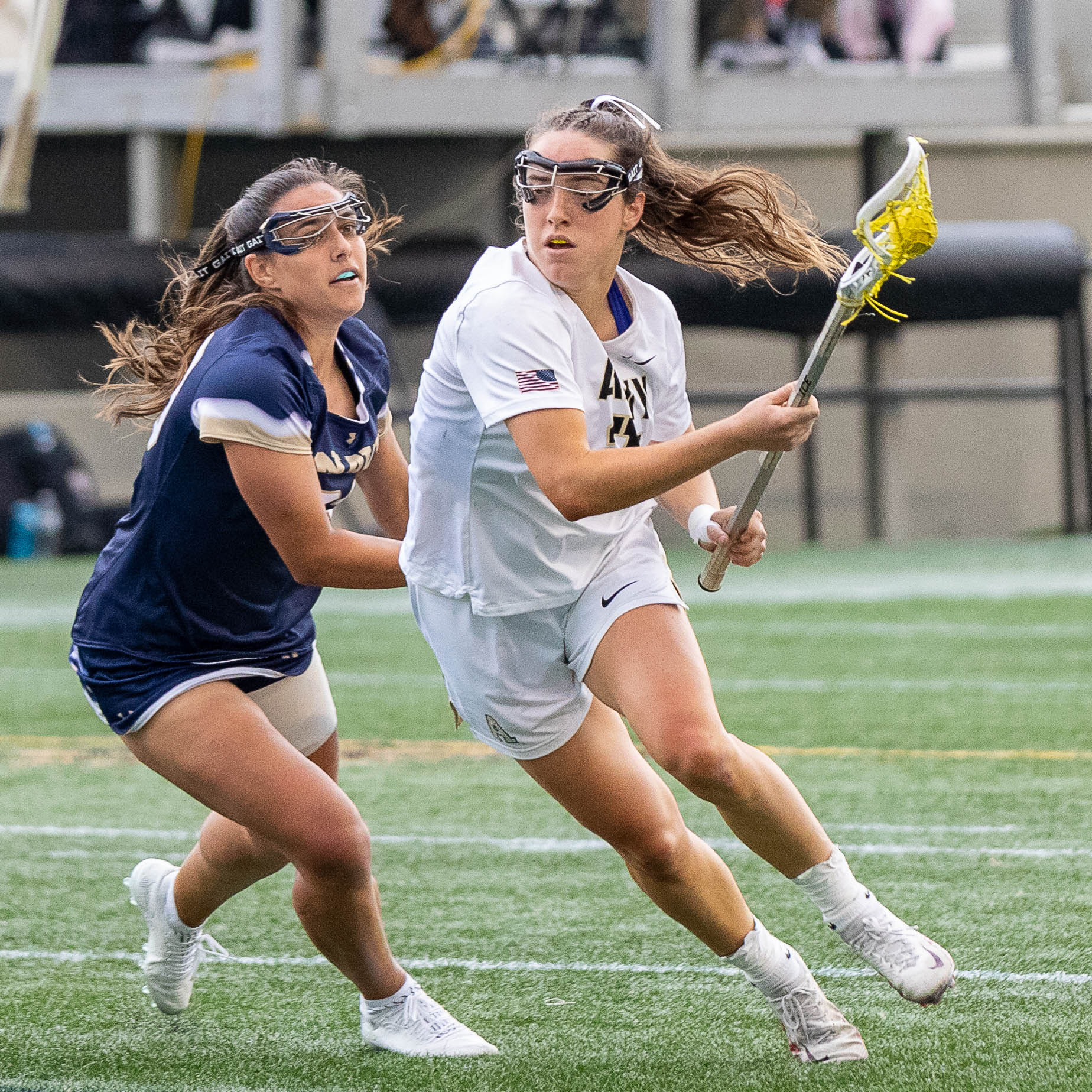
A women's lacrosse game between Army and Navy at Michie Stadium in 2023

== Head coach ==
The Black Knights were led by coach Kristen Skiera, who was named the team's inaugural head coach prior to the 2016 season. Prior to assuming the duties of Army's NCAA Division I program, Skiera was the coach of Army's club team for its final year.

Michelle Tumolo was named head coach in June 2021. Prior to becoming the head coach at Army, Tumolo spent three seasons as the head coach at Wagner Seahawks.

== Individual career records ==
Record	Amount	Player	Years
Goals	259	Brigid Duffy	2023–Present
Assists	179	Allison Reilly	2023–Present
Points	374	Allison Reilly	2023–Present
Ground balls	181	Brigid Duffy	2023–Present
Draw controls	366	Brigid Duffy	2023–Present
Caused turnovers	128	Brigid Duffy	2023–Present
Saves	445	Lindsey Serafine	2023–Present
Save %*	.447	Maddie Burns	2017–20
GAA**	10.64	Lindsey Serafine	2023–Present

*Minimum 20 saves
**Minimum 500 minutes

== Individual single-season records ==
Record	Amount	Player	Year
Goals	77	Brigid Duffy	2026
Assists	80	Allison Reilly	2026
Points	133	Allison Reilly	2026
Ground balls	56	Brigid Duffy	2026
Draw controls	114	Julia Franzoni	2023
Caused turnovers	49	Brigid Duffy	2026
Saves	141	Lacey Bartholomay	2022
Save %*	.506	Maddie Burns	2020
GAA**	10.28	Lindsey Serafine	2023

*Minimum 20 saves
**Minimum 250 minutes

== Individual game records ==
Record	Amount	Player	Date
Goals	9 (2)	Allison Reilly, Brigid Duffy	4/22/23, 4/23/25
Assists	8	Allison Reilly	2/21/26
Points	12 (3)	Allison Reilly (1), Allison Reilly (2), Allison Reilly (3)	4/22/23, 4/23/25, 2/10/26
Ground balls	7 (3)	Maddie Burns (1), Maddie Burns (2), Brigid Duffy	3/8/17, 4/19/17, 3/1/26
Draw controls	14	Julia Franzoni	2/11/23
Caused turnovers	7	Brigid Duffy	3/1/26
Saves	18	Maddie Burns	4/21/18
Goals Allowed*	1	Lindsey Serafine	3/29/25

*Minimum 30 minutes played & 10 shots faced

== Team Captains ==
Year	Captains
2016	Erin Jollota, Shelby Lindsay, Leah Wasserman
2017	Erin Jollota, Shelby Lindsay, Amy Johnston, Kiersten Spencer
2018	Amy Johnston, Kiersten Spencer
2019	Maddie Burns, Nia Crump, Rilee Scott
2020	Samantha Stewart, Taylor Korpela, Maddie Burns, Rilee Scot
2021	Megan Raftery, Jackie Brattan, Hannah Slomkowski
2022	Brooke Allen, Ceara Sweeney, Sidney Weigand
2023	Evelyn Pickett, Jolie Riedell, Kathleen Sullivan, Sidney Weigand
2024	Lacey Bartholomay, Madeline Lenkart, Sofia Micklovic
2025	Brigid Duffy, Haley Kampert, Lexi Patterson
2026	Brigid Duffy, Meghan Pedrani, Allison Reilly, Lily Valentini

== Seasons ==
Record table
Season	Coach	Overall	Conference	Standing	Postseason
NCAA Division I (Patriot League) (2016–present)
2016	Kristen Skiera	5–12	0–9	10th	
2017	Kristen Skiera	5–12	1–8	T-9th	
2018	Kristen Skiera	10–7	4–5	T-6th	
2019	Kristen Skiera	14–5	6–3	T-3rd	
2020	Kristen Skiera	7–0	0–0	T-1st	
2021	Kristen Skiera	5–4	5–2	1st (North)	
2022	Michelle Tumolo	12–6	7–1	T-2nd	
2023	Michelle Tumolo	15–4	8–1	2nd	NCAA First Round
2024	Michelle Tumolo	9–8	7–2	3rd	
2025	Michelle Tumolo	13–4	8–1	2nd	NCAA First Round
2026	Michelle Tumolo	15–5	8–1	T-1st	NCAA Second Round
Total:		110–67 (.621)			
National champion Postseason invitational champion Conference regular season champion Conference regular season and conference tournament champion Division regular season champion Division regular season and conference tournament champion Conference tournament champion
