= Michigan Wolverines women's lacrosse =

Women's lacrosse team of the University of Michigan

- Founded: 2014
- University: University of Michigan
- Head coach: Hannah Nielsen (9th season)
- Stadium: U-M Lacrosse Stadium (capacity: 2,000)
- Location: Ann Arbor, Michigan
- Conference: Big Ten Conference
- Nickname: Wolverines
- Colors: Maize and blue
- Website: http://mgoblue.com/index.aspx?path=wlax

NCAA Tournament Quarterfinals
- 2024

NCAA Tournament appearances
- 2019, 2022, 2023, 2024, 2025, 2026

The Michigan Wolverines women's lacrosse team is the intercollegiate women's lacrosse program representing the University of Michigan. The school competes in the Big Ten Conference in Division I of the National Collegiate Athletic Association (NCAA). The Wolverines play their home games in Ann Arbor, primarily at Michigan Stadium, with the indoor Oosterbaan Field House as a secondary option. Women's lacrosse was established as a varsity sport in 2014, and the team played in the American Lacrosse Conference during its inaugural season before joining the Big Ten in 2015. The team is currently coached by Hannah Nielsen.

== History ==
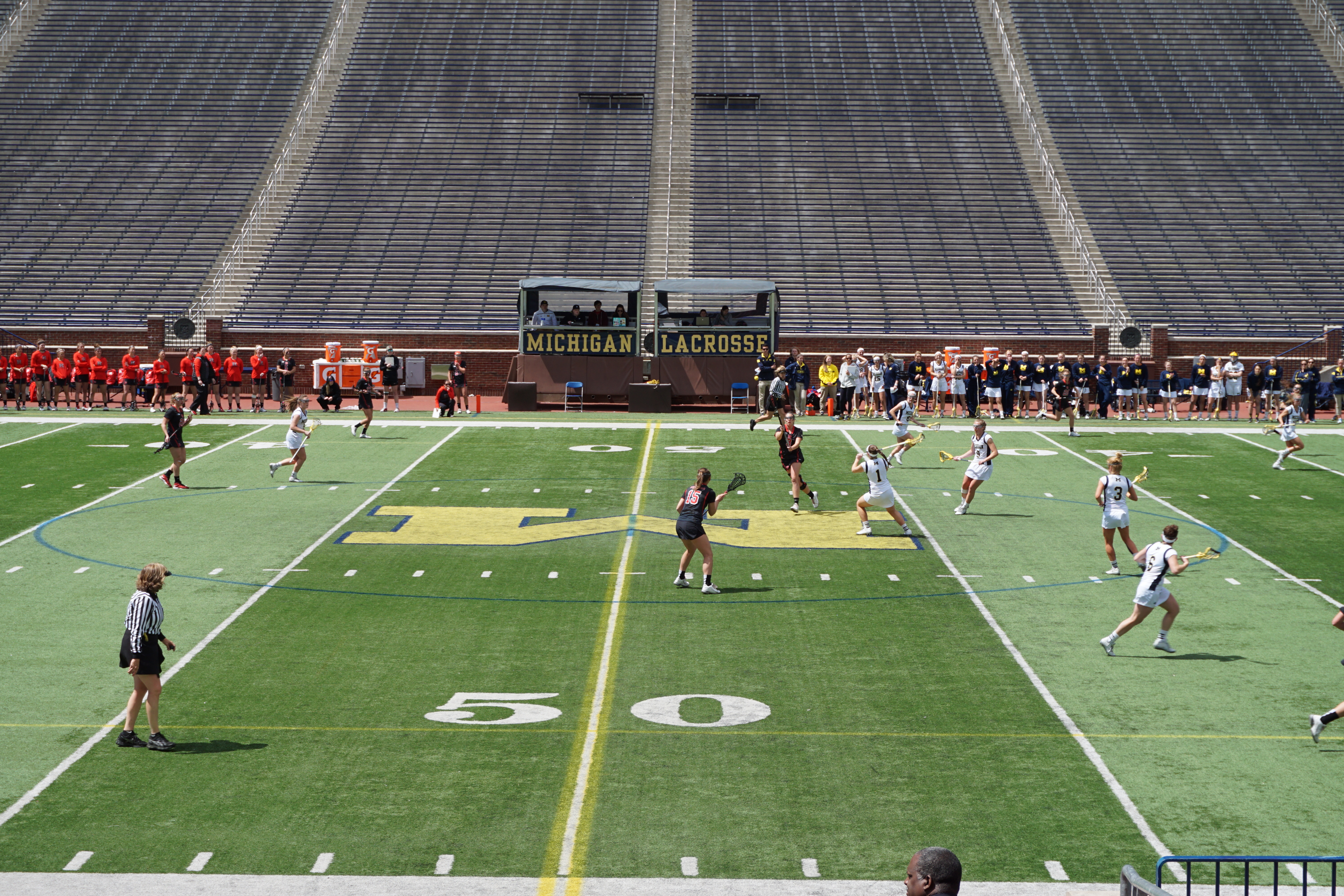
Michigan in action against Rutgers in 2015

Prior to the establishment of its varsity program, women's lacrosse was a club sport at the University of Michigan. In 2011, the club team compiled a record of 15–6 under the direction of head coach Jen Dunbar. On May 25, 2011, Michigan officially promoted its women's lacrosse team to varsity status, the same day that the school's varsity men's program was announced. Unlike the men's team, the women's team was not originally scheduled to begin play until 2013. In May 2011, the most pressing priorities for the new women's program were the search for its first head coach and its application for membership in the American Lacrosse Conference, which counted among its members other Big Ten schools such as Northwestern, Ohio State, and Penn State, as well as more distant institutions such as Florida, Johns Hopkins, and Vanderbilt.

In 2014, Michigan played its inaugural varsity season as a member of the American Lacrosse Conference under head coach Jennifer Ulehla. Prior to being named head coach on September 8, 2011, Uleha had been an assistant coach at Florida and with the U.S. National Elite Team as well as an assistant coach at Temple and James Madison. The program's first official varsity game was at Villanova on February 22, while its home opener was against Marquette on February 28 at Oosterbaan Field House. On June 3, 2013, the Big Ten Conference announced that it would begin sponsoring women's lacrosse in 2015; together with men's lacrosse, which would debut the same season, they would respectively be the conference's 27th and 28th official sports. Alongside Michigan, the five other teams competing in the new conference included Maryland, Northwestern, Ohio State, Penn State, and Rutgers. As of 2015, head coach Uleha's coaching staff consists of assistant coaches Becca Block and Alyssa Murray.

== Coaching staff ==
Name	Position coached	Consecutive season at Michigan in current position
Hannah Nielsen	Head coach	7th
Ana Heneberry	Assistant coach	7th
Casey Pearsall	Assistant coach	2nd
Nora Boerger	Assistant coach	1st

== Season results ==
The following is a list of Michigan's season results as an NCAA Division I program:

Season	Coach	Overall	Conference	Standing	Postseason
Jennifer Ulehla (American Lacrosse Conference) (2014–2015)
2014	Jennifer Ulehla	4–13	0–6	7th	
Jennifer Ulehla (Big Ten Conference) (2015–2017)
2015	Jennifer Ulehla	5–12	0–5	6th	
2016	Jennifer Ulehla	6–12	0–5	6th	
2017	Jennifer Ulehla	5–12	1–5	6th	
Jennifer Ulehla:		20–49 (.290)	1–21 (.045)		
Hannah Nielsen (Big Ten Conference) (2018–Present)
2018	Hannah Nielsen	7–10	2–4	5th	
2019	Hannah Nielsen	16–4	4–2	3rd	NCAA Second Round
2020	Hannah Nielsen	5–1	0–0	†	†
2021	Hannah Nielsen	3–9	3–8	7th	
2022	Hannah Nielsen	11–7	2–4	T–4th	NCAA Second Round
2023	Hannah Nielsen	12–8	3–3	T–3rd	NCAA Second Round
2024	Hannah Nielsen	16–4	4–2	T–2nd	NCAA Quarterfinals
2025	Hannah Nielsen	13–7	5–3	T–3rd	NCAA Second Round
2026	Hannah Nielsen	13–7	5–3	T–3rd	NCAA Second Round
Hannah Nielsen:		96–57 (.627)	28–29 (.491)		
Total:		116–106 (.523)			
National champion Postseason invitational champion Conference regular season champion Conference regular season and conference tournament champion Division regular season champion Division regular season and conference tournament champion Conference tournament champion

†NCAA cancelled 2020 collegiate activities due to the COVID-19 pandemic

== Stadium ==
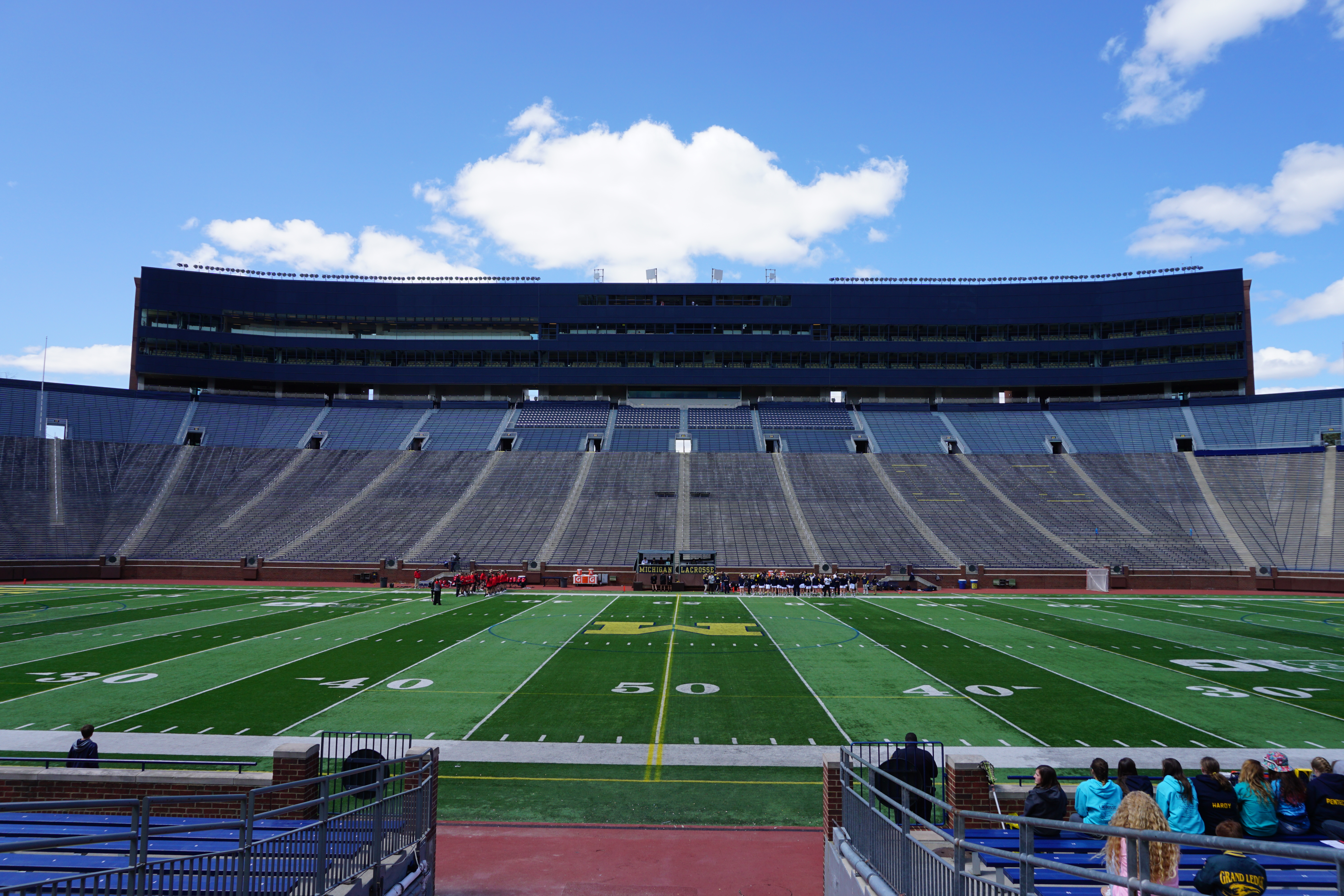
Michigan Stadium before a game in April 2015

Michigan plays its home games at both Michigan Stadium and Oosterbaan Field House. For both the 2014 and 2015 seasons, the team scheduled its first two games of the year at Oosterbaan, and then played the remainder of its home schedule (six games, in both cases) at Michigan Stadium. Oosterbaan Field House, which was built in 1970, has a total capacity of 1,000 and a FieldTurf playing surface. Michigan Stadium boasts a capacity of 107,601 and was built for the Michigan football team in 1927; however, it did not host a varsity lacrosse game until 2012, when the Michigan men's lacrosse program played its first game there. The women's team played its first game at Michigan Stadium on March 20, 2014, losing to Winthrop, 14–12.

== Individual career records ==
As of 13 May 2025

Record	Number	Player	Years
Goals	196	Jill Smith	2022–2025
Assists	90	Caitlin Muir	2018–2022
Points	245	Jill Smith	2022–2025
Ground balls	111	Maddie Burns	2021–2024
Draw controls	239	Anna Schueler	2014–2017
Saves	371	Mira Shane	2016–2019
Save %	.519	Erin O'Grady	2022–2025

== Individual single season records ==
As of 13 May 2025

Record	Number	Player	Year
Goals	65	Jill Smith	2023
Assists	34	Kaylee Dyer	2025
Points	82	Jill Smith	2025
Ground balls	41	Allison Silber; Maddie Burns	2014; 2024
Draw controls	135	Emma Burke	2025
Saves	167	Erin O'Grady	2025
Save %	.549	Erin O'Grady	2024

== Individual honors ==
First Team All Americans

- Maddie Burns - 2024
- Erin O'Grady - 2024

Big Ten Defender of the Year

- Maddie Burns - 2024

Big Ten Goaltender of the Year

- Erin O'Grady - 2024
- Erin O'Grady - 2025

== Postseason results ==
The Wolverines have appeared in 6 NCAA tournaments. Their postseason record is 7–6.

Year	Seed	Round	Opponent	Score
2019	#8	First Round; Second Round	Jacksonville; Denver	W 13–9; L 5–9
2022	–	First Round; Second Round	Notre Dame #4 Northwestern	W 17–11; L 12–15
2023	–	First Round; Second Round	Central Michigan #1 Northwestern	W 13–6; L 7–8
2024	–	First Round; Second Round; Quarterfinal	Mercer #7 Notre Dame #2 Boston College	W 17–6; W 15–14; L 9–14
2025	–	First Round; Second Round	Akron #3 Northwestern	W 17–6; L 7–15
2026	#7	First Round; Second Round	Mercer; Stanford	W 18–8; L 12–13
