= Spring-Ford Area School District =

School district in Pennsylvania

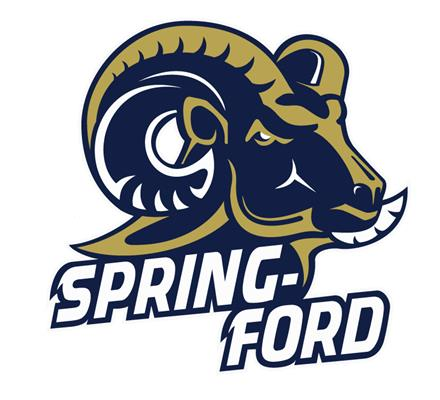

Address
- 857 South Lewis Road Royersford, Montgomery, Pennsylvania, 19468; United States

District information
- Type: Public
- Grades: K–12
- Established: 1955; 71 years ago
- Superintendent: Jay Burkhart (since 2026)
- Asst. superintendent(s): Dr. Giambattista & Dr. Murray
- Business administrator: James Fink
- School board: 9 members
- Chair of the board: Gabrielle “Abby” Deardorff
- Governing agency: Pennsylvania Department of Education
- Schools: 11
- Budget: $215 million (2025-2026)
- NCES District ID: 4222560
- District ID: PA-123467303

Students and staff
- Students: 8,101 (2024-2025)
- Teachers: 610
- Staff: 1,212
- Student–teacher ratio: 13:1
- Athletic conference: Pioneer Athletic Conference
- District mascot: Ram
- Colors: Oxford Blue, Vegas Gold, and White

Other information
- District Population: 54,246 (2024)
- Athletic District: PIAA District 1
- State Assessments: PSSA & Keystone Exams
- District Area: 44.4 sq mi
- Schedule: M-F except state holidays
- Website: www.spring-ford.net

The Spring-Ford Area School District is a K-12 school district based in Montgomery County, Pennsylvania, United States, which expands into Chester County. The system is made up of Limerick Township and Upper Providence Township, along with the boroughs of Royersford and Spring City.

The district includes seven elementary schools for grades K–4, a combined intermediate-level campus for grades 5–7, an eighth-grade center, a ninth-grade center, and Spring-Ford Senior High School, which serves grades 10–12.

The district’s elementary schools include Brooke Elementary School, Evans Elementary School, Limerick Elementary School, Oaks Elementary School—the largest elementary school in the district by enrollment as of late 2025—Royersford Elementary School, Spring City Elementary School, and Upper Providence Elementary School. Spring City Elementary School underwent major renovations during the 2024–2025 school year and reopened for the 2025–2026 school year.

The community of approximately 50,990 straddles the US-422 bypass. The district is characterized by small towns, suburban neighborhoods and rural areas, with the name being denoted through the combination of Spring City and Royersford, to make the name Spring-Ford. The district is approximately twenty miles northwest of Philadelphia, PA, twenty-five miles south of Reading, Pennsylvania, and five miles north of Valley Forge, Pennsylvania. The district has a combined land area of 44.4 square miles, and the 2020 US Census population of the district is 50,990, compared to 47,368 in 2010 and 36,483 in 2000.

== Curriculum ==
In 1966, the high school began offering graphic arts and power mechanics.

== Extracurricular activities ==
=== Student Journalism ===
==== The Rampage ====
Spring-Ford is home to a student-written news magazine that can be read digitally and physically.

==== Ramoirs Literary Magazine ====
Ramoirs is the student literary magazine at Spring-Ford. Throughout the year, poetry, stories, art, and photography submissions are collected and edited and then compiled into an annual publication.

== Notable alumni ==
- Lisa Waltz (1979), actress
- Amanda O'Leary (1984), lacrosse coach, Florida Gators
- Joey Graziadei (2013), reality television personality, star of The Bachelor Season 28
- Nicholas Damiano (2014), acclaimed and award winning robotics engineer.
- Lucy Olsen (2021), professional basketball player
- Ashley Sessa (2022), professional field-hockey player
