= Clemson Tigers women's lacrosse =

College lacrosse team

- Founded: 2023; 3 years ago
- University: Clemson University
- Head coach: Allison Kwolek (4th season)
- Stadium: Clemson Lacrosse Complex (capacity: 1,000)
- Location: Clemson, South Carolina
- Conference: Atlantic Coast Conference
- Nickname: Tigers
- Colors: Orange and regalia

NCAA Tournament appearances
- 2025, 2026

The Clemson Tigers women's lacrosse team is an NCAA Division I college lacrosse team representing Clemson University as part of the Atlantic Coast Conference. They play their home games at Clemson Lacrosse Complex in Clemson, South Carolina. The team is coached by head coach Allison Kwolek.

== History ==
One of the newest programs in NCAA Division I women's lacrosse, Clemson played its first season in 2023. Under head coach Allison Kwolek, the Tigers went 12-6 in its inaugural 2023 season.

In 2025, Clemson appeared in its first NCAA tournament.

In 2026, the Tigers appeared again in the NCAA tournament for a second straight year.

== Individual career records ==
Record	Amount	Player	Years
Goals	101	Natalie Shurtleff	2024-Present
Assists	71	Alexa Spallina	2026–Present
Points	159	Natalie Shurtleff	2024-Present
Ground balls	113	Paris Masaracchia	2023–Present
Draw controls	287	Kira Balis	2025-Present
Caused turnovers	99	Paris Masaracchia	2023–Present
Saves	419	Emily Lamparter	2023–25
Save %*	.466	Emily Lamparter	2023–25
GAA**	8.49	Tessa DeLuca	2026–Present

*Minimum 20 saves
**Minimum 500 minutes

== Individual single-season records ==
Record	Amount	Player	Year
Goals	60	Lindsey Marshall	2025
Assists	71	Alexa Spallina	2026
Points	110	Alexa Spallina	2026
Ground balls	58	Teagan Scott	2026
Draw controls	148	Kira Balis	2025
Caused turnovers	68	Teagan Scott	2026
Saves	156	Emily Lamparter	2025
Save %*	.473	Emily Lamparter	2023
GAA**	8.49	Tessa DeLuca	2026

*Minimum 20 saves
**Minimum 250 minutes

== Individual game records ==
Record	Amount	Player	Date
Goals	7 (2)	Hanna Hilcoff; Natalie Shurtleff	2/18/23, 2/21/26
Assists	10	Alexa Spallina	3/31/26
Points	13	Alexa Spallina	3/31/26
Ground balls	8	Paris Masaracchia	4/24/24
Draw controls	20	Kira Balis	3/4/25
Caused turnovers	10	Teagan Scott	2/14/26
Saves	16	Emily Lamparter (1), Emily Lamparter (2)	2/25/23, 3/9/24

== Seasons ==
Record table
Season	Coach	Overall	Conference	Standing	Postseason
NCAA Division I ( Atlantic Coast Conference) (2023–present)
2023	Allison Kwolek	12-6	4-5	6th	
2024	Allison Kwolek	11-7	3-6	7th	
2025	Allison Kwolek	14-7	6-3	5th	NCAA Second Round
2026	Allison Kwolek	15-6	7-3	3rd	NCAA Second Round
2027	Allison Kwolek	0-0	0-0		
Total:		52-26 (.667)			
National champion Postseason invitational champion Conference regular season champion Conference regular season and conference tournament champion Division regular season champion Division regular season and conference tournament champion Conference tournament champion

== Postseason Results ==
The Tigers have appeared in 2 NCAA tournaments. Their postseason record is 2–2.

Year	Seed	Round	Opponent	Score
2025	--	First Round; Second Round	Navy #1 North Carolina	W, 11-8; L, 9-18
2026	--	First Round; Second Round	Davidson #2 North Carolina	W, 19-6; L, 6-17
