= 2024 NCAA Division I women's lacrosse tournament =

College lacrosse tournament

- Dates: May 10–26, 2024
- Teams: 29
- Finals site: WakeMed Soccer Park, Cary, NC
- Champions: Boston College (2nd title)
- Runner-up: Northwestern (10th title game)
- Semifinalists: Florida (2nd Final Four); Syracuse (13th Final Four)
- Winning coach: Acacia Walker (2nd title)
- MOP: Kayla Martello, Boston College
- Attendance: 4,884 finals

The 2024 NCAA Division I Women's Lacrosse Championship was the 42nd annual single-elimination tournament to determine the national champion of NCAA Division I women's college lacrosse. The semifinal and championship rounds were played at WakeMed Soccer Park in Cary, North Carolina from May 24–26, 2024. All other rounds were played at campus sites, usually at the home field of the higher-seeded team, from May 10–16. In the championship game, Boston College defeated Northwestern 14–13, avenging its 18–6 loss to Northwestern in the previous year's championship game.

== Tournament field ==
All NCAA Division I women's lacrosse programs were eligible for this championship, and a total of 29 teams were invited to participate. 15 teams qualified automatically by winning their conference tournaments, while the remaining 14 teams qualified at-large based on their regular season records.

=== Teams ===
Seed	School	Conference	Berth Type	RPI	Record
1	Northwestern	Big Ten	Automatic	1	15–2
2	Boston College	ACC	Automatic	2	16–3
3	Syracuse	ACC	At-large	3	14–5
4	Maryland	Big Ten	At-large	6	12–5
5	Virginia	ACC	At-large	10	14–4
6	Yale	Ivy	Automatic	4	15–2
7	Notre Dame	ACC	At-large	11	15–3
8	Penn	Ivy	At-large	4	13–4
	Binghamton	America East	Automatic	42	12–6
	Coastal Carolina	ASUN	Automatic	33	14–5
	Denver	Big East	Automatic	14	15–3
	Drexel	CAA	At-large	20	13–5
	Duke	ACC	At-large	31	10–8
	Fairfield	MAAC	At-large	16	16–2
	Florida	American	Automatic	15	17–2
	James Madison	American	At-large	19	13–5
	Johns Hopkins	Big Ten	At-large	12	11–7
	LIU	Northeast	Automatic	73	11–7
	Loyola (MD)	Patriot	Automatic	8	17–2
	Mercer	Big South	Automatic	41	14–5
	Michigan	Big Ten	At-large	9	14–3
	Niagara	MAAC	Automatic	26	16–3
	North Carolina	ACC	At-large	18	10–6
	Penn State	Big Ten	At-large	21	11–7
	Princeton	Ivy	At-large	17	10–6
	Richmond	Atlantic 10	Automatic	38	13–5
	Robert Morris	MAC	Automatic	102	8–11
	Stanford	Pac-12	Automatic	13	13–4
	Stony Brook	CAA	Automatic	7	17–2

== Bracket ==
First Round; May 9 Regional Campus Sites
Denver	13
Stanford	12
Loyola (MD)	16
Duke	11
Richmond	5
8	Penn*	16
5	Virginia*	21
LIU	6
Florida	17
North Carolina	8
Penn St.	13
James Madison	14
Robert Morris	1
4	Maryland*	17
Niagara	7
Stony Brook	19
Fairfield	5
Johns Hopkins	11
Binghamton	4
6	Yale*	17
7	Notre Dame*	24
Coastal Carolina	6
Mercer	6
Michigan	17
Drexel	9
Princeton	14

Second Round; May 11; Regional Campus Sites
1	Northwestern*	17
Denver	4
Loyola (MD)	9
8	Penn	12
5	Virginia	8
Florida	13
James Madison	7
4	Maryland	17
3	Syracuse*	15
Stony Brook	10
Johns Hopkins	7
6	Yale	9
7	Notre Dame	14
Michigan	15
Princeton	16
2	Boston College*	21

Quarterfinals; May 15; Campus Sites
1	Northwestern	20
8	Penn	7
Florida	15
4	Maryland	9
3	Syracuse	19
6	Yale	9
Michigan	9
2	Boston College	14

Semifinals; May 23; Gillette Stadium
1	Northwestern	15
Florida	11
3	Syracuse	7
2	Boston College	10

Final; May 25; Gillette Stadium
1	Northwestern	13
2	Boston College	14

- *First and second round host

== Record by conference ==
Overview of conference performance in the 2024 NCAA Division I women's lacrosse tournament
Conference	# of Bids	Record	Win %	FR	SR	QF	SF	CG	NC
ACC	6	8–5	.615	4	4	2	2	1	1
Big Ten	5	8–5	.615	4	4	3	1	1	–
American	2	4–2	.667	2	2	1	1	–	–
Ivy League	3	5–3	.625	3	3	2	–	–	–
Big East	1	1–1	.500	1	1	–	–	–	–
Patriot	1	1–1	.500	1	1	–	–	–	–
CAA	2	1–2	.333	2	1	–	–	–	–
MAAC	2	0–2	.000	2	–	–	–	–	–
America East	1	0–1	.000	1	–	–	–	–	–
ASUN	1	0–1	.000	1	–	–	–	–	–
Atlantic 10	1	0–1	.000	1	–	–	–	–	–
Big South	1	0–1	.000	1	–	–	–	–	–
MAC	1	0–1	.000	1	–	–	–	–	–
NEC	1	0–1	.000	1	–	–	–	–	–
Pac-12	1	0–1	.000	1	–	–	–	–	–

== See also ==
- NCAA Division II Women's Lacrosse Championship
- NCAA Division III Women's Lacrosse Championship
- 2024 NCAA Division I men's lacrosse tournament
