= 2022 NCAA Division I women's lacrosse tournament =

College lacrosse tournament

- Dates: May 13–29, 2022
- Teams: 29
- Finals site: Homewood Field, Baltimore, MD
- Champions: North Carolina (3rd title)
- Runner-up: Boston College (5th title game)
- Semifinalists: Northwestern (13th Final Four); Maryland (28th Final Four)
- Winning coach: Jenny Levy (3rd title)
- MOP: Sam Geiersbach, North Carolina

The 2022 NCAA Division I Women's Lacrosse Championship was the 40th annual single-elimination tournament to determine the national champion of Division I NCAA women's college lacrosse. The semifinal and championship rounds will be played at Homewood Field in Baltimore, MD from May 27–29, 2022. All other rounds were played at campus sites, usually at the home field of the higher-seeded team, from May 13–19. North Carolina won the national championship, 12-11 over Boston College.

== Tournament field ==
All NCAA Division I women's lacrosse programs were eligible for this championship, and a total of 29 teams were invited to participate. 15 teams qualified automatically by winning their conference tournaments, while the remaining 14 teams qualified at-large based on their regular season records.

=== Teams ===
Seed	School	Conference	Berth Type	RPI	Record
1	North Carolina	ACC	Automatic	1	18–0
2	Maryland	Big Ten	Automatic	2	17–1
3	Boston College	ACC	At-large	3	16–3
4	Northwestern	Big Ten	At-large	4	13–4
5	Syracuse	ACC	At-large	6	13–5
6	Loyola (MD)	Patriot	Automatic	10	18–1
7	Florida	American	Automatic	5	15–4
8	Stony Brook	America East	At-large	8	14–2
	Central Michigan	MAC	Automatic	74	12–7
	Denver	Big East	Automatic	9	17–2
	Drexel	CAA	Automatic	37	12–7
	Duke	ACC	At-large	13	15–3
	Fairfield	MAAC	Automatic	32	13–6
	Jacksonville	ASUN	Automatic	21	13–4
	James Madison	CAA	At-large	12	13–4
	Johns Hopkins	Big Ten	At-large	15	10–8
	Mercer	Big South	Automatic	34	14–4
	Michigan	Big Ten	At-large	20	10–6
	Mount St. Mary's	NEC	Automatic	45	15–4
	Notre Dame	ACC	At-large	17	9–9
	Princeton	Ivy	Automatic	11	14–3
	Rutgers	Big Ten	At-large	7	15–4
	Saint Joseph's	Atlantic 10	Automatic	29	14–6
	Stanford	Pac-12	Automatic	26	12–6
	UConn	Big East	At-large	14	13–4
	UMass	Atlantic 10	At-large	19	16–3
	USC	Pac-12	At-large	16	13–4
	Vermont	America East	Automatic	33	14–4
	Virginia	ACC	At-large	18	9–9

== Bracket ==
=== Tournament bracket ===
First Round; May 13; Regional Campus Sites
USC	11
Virginia	13
Rutgers	17
Saint Joseph's	10
Drexel	4
8	Stony Brook*	16
5	Syracuse	12
Fairfield	11
UMass	9
Princeton*	15
Michigan	17
Notre Dame	11
Central Michigan	7
4	Northwestern*	22
Denver	16
Vermont	3
UConn	7
James Madison	14
Mount St. Mary's	5
6	Loyola (MD)*	17
7	Florida*	19
Mercer	12
Jacksonville	20
Stanford	8
Duke	17
Johns Hopkins	12

Second Round; May 15; Regional Campus Sites
1	North Carolina*	24
Virginia	2
Rutgers	7
8	Stony Brook	11
5	Syracuse	13
Princeton	9
Michigan	12
4	Northwestern	15
3	Boston College*	13
Denver	8
James Madison	8
6	Loyola (MD)	18
7	Florida	15
Jacksonville	10
Duke	6
2	Maryland*	19

Quarterfinals; May 19; Campus Sites
1	North Carolina	8
8	Stony Brook	5
5	Syracuse	4
4	Northwestern	15
3	Boston College	20
6	Loyola (MD)	13
7	Florida	5
2	Maryland	18

Semifinals; May 27; Homewood Field
1	North Carolina	15
4	Northwestern	14
3	Boston College	17
2	Maryland	16

Final; May 29; Homewood Field
1	North Carolina	12
3	Boston College	11

- *First and second round host

== See also ==
- NCAA Division II Women's Lacrosse Championship
- NCAA Division III Women's Lacrosse Championship
- NCAA Division I Men's Lacrosse Championship
