= Chloe Humphrey =

American lacrosse player (born 2005)

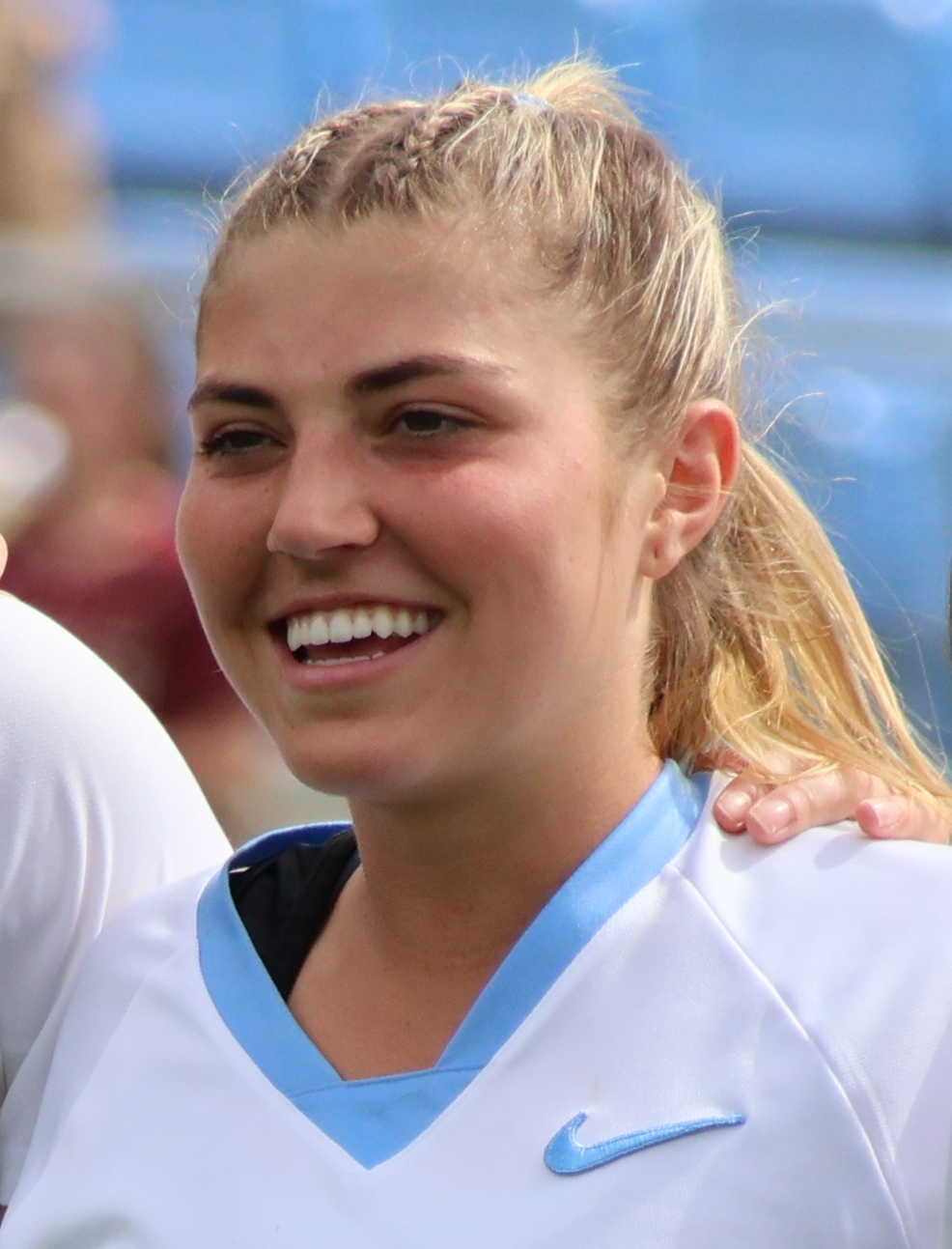
- Humphrey with North Carolina in 2026

Personal information
- Born: March 5, 2005 (age 21)
- Height: 5 ft 4 in (163 cm)

Sport
- Position: Attack
- NCAA team: North Carolina (2024–)
Medal record
Representing United States
Lacrosse sixes
World Games
Gold medal – first place	2025 Chengdu	Team

Chloe Clarissa Humphrey (born March 5, 2005) is an American college lacrosse player for the North Carolina Tar Heels. In her freshman season, she led the Tar Heels to the 2025 national championship and became the first redshirt freshman to win the Tewaaraton Award.

== Early life ==
Humphrey grew up in Darien, Connecticut, one of four children born to Sarah and John Humphrey. She has two older sisters, Nicole and Ashley, and a younger brother, Brett. She began playing soccer before following her sisters into lacrosse in fifth grade. She won two state championships at Darien High School, where she was named All-American two times and the USA Lacrosse High School Player of the Year as a senior. She was ranked by Inside Lacrosse as the top recruit of the 2023 class. Playing for club team Connecticut Grizzlies.

== College career ==
Humphrey sat out her freshman season with the North Carolina Tar Heels due to a stress reaction foot injury sustained in the 2024 preseason. In her redshirt freshman season in 2025, she started all 22 games and scored 90 goals, an NCAA freshman single-season record and program single-season record. With sisters Nicole and Ashley, she led the Tar Heels to a perfect 22–0 record, the Atlantic Coast Conference regular-season and tournament titles, and the program's fourth NCAA championship. She scored a season-high 7 goals in a 20–4 win against Florida in the semifinals. She had 4 goals and an assist in the national title game, winning 12–8 against Northwestern, and was named the tournament's most outstanding player. She was named the IWLCA National Player of the Year. Humphrey became the first freshman (man or women) and first Tar Heel to win the Tewaaraton Award.

== International career ==
Following her redshirt freshman campaign, Humphrey helped the United States national team win gold medals at the 2025 Pan-American Women's Lacrosse Championship and the 2025 World Games.
