= Fairfield Stags women's lacrosse =

Lacrosse team

- Founded: 1997; 29 years ago
- University: Fairfield University
- Head coach: Laura Field (since 2011 season)
- Stadium: Conway Field at Rafferty Stadium (capacity: 3,500)
- Location: Fairfield, Connecticut
- Conference: Metro Atlantic Athletic Conference
- Nickname: Stags
- Colors: Red

NCAA Tournament appearances
- 2009, 2015, 2018, 2019, 2021, 2022, 2023, 2024, 2025, 2026

Conference Tournament championships
- 2001, 2009, 2015, 2018, 2019, 2021, 2022, 2023, 2025, 2026

Conference regular season championships
- 1999, 2001, 2002, 2003, 2008, 2009, 2010, 2011, 2012, 2014, 2018, 2019, 2021, 2023, 2024, 2025, 2026

The Fairfield Stags women's lacrosse team is an NCAA Division I college lacrosse team representing Fairfield University as part of the Metro Atlantic Athletic Conference (MAAC). They play their home games at Conway Field at Rafferty Stadium in Fairfield, Connecticut. The Stags are led by head coach Laura Field.

== History ==
The Stags women's lacrosse program began play in the 1997 season, going 7-7 in its first season. Fairfield has made NCAA tournament appearances in 2009, 2015, 2018, 2019, 2021, 2022, 2023, 2024, 2025, and 2026.

In 2024, Fairfield lost to Niagara in the finals of the MAAC tournament, with Niagara earning the conference's automatic bid to the NCAA tournament. Despite the loss, Fairfield received the program's first-ever at-large bid to the NCAA tournament. The selection also marked the first time the MAAC sent two teams to the tournament in the same season.

Fairfield has only reached the NCAA tournament second round one time, winning the first round over Sacred Heart in 2009. Since that victory, the Stags are 0-10 in the NCAA tournament through 2026.

Under head coach Laura Field, Fairfield has emerged as one of the top programs in the MAAC. Field, the winningest coach in program history, has led the Stags to multiple MAAC championships and consecutive NCAA tournament appearances. During her tenure, Fairfield has also earned a national ranking for the first time in 15 years and recorded the program's first victories over nationally ranked opponents. Field was named the MAAC Coach of the Year in both 2023 and 2024. In 2026, she was inducted into the Connecticut Lacrosse Foundation Hall of Fame in recognition of her success and contributions to the sport.

== Individual career records ==
Record	Amount	Player	Years
Goals	186	Kristen Coleman	2008-11
Assists	83	Libby Rowe	2020–23
Points	257	Kristen Coleman	2008-11
Ground balls	220	Kelly Horning	2018–22
Draw controls	378	Brynn Donnelly	2023-Present
Caused turnovers	131	Kelly Horning	2018–22
Saves	626	Lauren Chatnik	2006–09
Save %*	.603	Lauren Rapacki	1998–99
GAA**	8.16	Chelsey Sidaras	2013–16

*Minimum 100 saves
**Minimum 1200 minutes

== Individual single-season records ==
Record	Amount	Player	Year
Goals	68	Kristen Coleman	2008
Assists	55	Tessa Caputo	2026
Points	90	Kristen Coleman	2008
Ground balls	79	Mary Tortora	1997
Draw controls	149	Brynn Donnelly	2025
Caused turnovers	64	Kate Riitano	1998
Saves	211	Paulina DiFatta	2018
Save %*	.610	Lauren Rapacki	1998
GAA**	7.23	Chelsey Sidaras	2014

*Minimum 50 saves
**Minimum 500 minutes

== Seasons ==
Record table
Season	Coach	Overall	Conference	Standing	Postseason
NCAA Division I (Metro Atlantic Athletic Conference) (1997–present)
1997	Kathryn Vignati	7-7	5-1	2nd	
1998	Kathryn Vignati	7-8	5-1	2nd	
1999	Kathryn Vignati	8-8	6-0	1st	
2000	Kathryn Vignati	5-11	4-2	T-3rd	
2001	Melissa Michels	10-7	6-0	T-1st	
2002	Laura Brand	9-8	6-0	1st	
2003	Stacy McCue	8-9	6-0	1st	
2004	Stacy McCue	4-12	3-3	T-3rd	
2005	Stacy McCue	4-12	2-5	6th	
2006	Stacy McCue	7-10	4-2	3rd	
2007	Stacy McCue	8-10	5-2	2nd	
2008	Beth Loffredo	17-2	6-0	1st	
2009	Mike Waldvogel	17-3	6-0	1st	NCAA First Round
2010	Mike Waldvogel	13-5	6-0	1st	
2011	Mike Waldvogel	13-5	6-0	1st	
2012	Mike Waldvogel	13-4	6-0	1st	
2013	Mike Waldvogel	10-8	4-2	T-2nd	
2014	Mike Waldvogel	12-5	7-1	T-1st	
2015	Mike Waldvogel	14-5	7-1	2nd	NCAA First Round
2016	Laura Field	9-9	4-4	T-5th	
2017	Laura Field	12-6	7-1	2nd	
2018	Laura Field	13-7	6-2	T-1st	NCAA First Round
2019	Laura Field	15-4	8-0	1st	NCAA Play-in
2020	Laura Field	2-5	0-0	N/A	
2021	Laura Field	13-2	10-1	1st	NCAA First Round
2022	Laura Field	13-7	5-3	T-3rd	NCAA First Round
2023	Laura Field	14-5	7-1	1st	NCAA First Round
2024	Laura Field	16-3	9-0	1st	NCAA First Round
2025	Laura Field	11-8	7-1	T-1st	NCAA First Round
2026	Laura Field	15-4	8-1	1st	NCAA First Round
Total:		319-199 (.616)			
National champion Postseason invitational champion Conference regular season champion Conference regular season and conference tournament champion Division regular season champion Division regular season and conference tournament champion Conference tournament champion
