= 2025 NCAA Division I women's lacrosse tournament =

- Dates: May 9–25, 2025
- Teams: 29
- Finals site: Gillette Stadium, Foxborough, Massachusetts
- Champions: North Carolina (4th title)
- Runner-up: Northwestern (11th title game)
- Semifinalists: Florida (3rd Final Four); Boston College (8th Final Four)
- Winning coach: Jenny Levy (4th title)
- MOP: Chloe Humphrey, North Carolina
- Attendance: 14,423 finals

The 2025 NCAA Division I Women's Lacrosse Championship was the 43rd annual single-elimination tournament to determine the national champion of NCAA Division I women's college lacrosse. The semifinal and championship rounds were played at Gillette Stadium in Foxborough, Massachusetts, on May 23 and May 25. All other rounds were played at campus sites, at the home field of the higher-seeded team, from May 9–15. First and second round games were broadcast on ESPN+, quarterfinals and semifinal games were broadcast on ESPNU, and the national championship was broadcast on ESPN.

== Tournament field ==
All NCAA Division I women's lacrosse programs were eligible for this championship, and a total of 29 teams were invited to participate. 15 teams qualified automatically by winning their conference tournaments, while the remaining 14 teams qualified at-large based on their regular season records.

=== Teams ===
Seed	School	Conference	Berth Type	RPI	Record
1	North Carolina	ACC	Automatic	1	18–0
2	Boston College	ACC	At-large	2	17–2
3	Northwestern	Big Ten	Automatic	3	16–2
4	Florida	Big 12	Automatic	5	17–2
5	Virginia	ACC	At-large	7	11–6
6	Maryland	Big Ten	At-large	8	14–5
7	Yale	Ivy	Automatic	6	14–3
8	Johns Hopkins	Big Ten	At-large	10	12–6
	Akron	MAC	Automatic	87	11–7
	Army West Point	Patriot	At-large	21	13–3
	Brown	Ivy	At-large	27	10–6
	Clemson	ACC	At-large	17	13–6
	Denver	Big East	Automatic	24	14–5
	Duke	ACC	At-large	20	12–5
	Fairfield	MAAC	Automatic	52	11–7
	James Madison	American	Automatic	9	14–4
	Liberty	ASUN	Automatic	39	12–7
	LIU	Northeast	Automatic	67	12–6
	Loyola (MD)	Patriot	At-large	15	13–6
	Massachusetts	Atlantic 10	Automatic	16	15–3
	Mercer	Big South	Automatic	53	12–7
	Michigan	Big Ten	At-large	19	12–6
	Navy	Patriot	Automatic	14	15–5
	Penn	Ivy	At-large	12	10–6
	Princeton	Ivy	At-large	4	14–3
	Stanford	ACC	At-large	11	14–5
	Stony Brook	CAA	Automatic	18	15–4
	Syracuse	ACC	At-large	13	9–8
	UAlbany	American East	Automatic	49	9–9

== Bracket ==
=== Tournament bracket ===
First Round; May 9 Regional Campus Sites
Navy	8
Clemson	11
Princeton	19
Massachusetts	10
Liberty	11
8	Johns Hopkins*	21
5	Virginia*	20
LIU	6
James Madison	10
Duke	17
Stanford	10
Denver	4
Mercer	6
4	Florida*	18
Michigan	17
Akron	6
Penn	16
Army West Point	6
Fairfield	7
6	Maryland*	16
7	Yale*	12
UAlbany	9
Syracuse	15
Brown	9
Loyola (MD)	8
Stony Brook	11

Second Round; May 11; Regional Campus Sites
1	North Carolina*	18
Clemson	9
Princeton	18
8	Johns Hopkins	12
5	Virginia	9
Duke	17
Stanford	12
4	Florida*	13
3	Northwestern*	15
Michigan	7
Penn	11
6	Maryland	10
7	Yale	9
Syracuse	8
Stony Brook	7
2	Boston College*	10

Quarterfinals; May 15; Campus Sites
1	North Carolina	19
Princeton	10
Duke	9
4	Florida	11
3	Northwestern	17
Penn	12
7	Yale	11
2	Boston College	18

Semifinals; May 23; Gillette Stadium
1	North Carolina	20
4	Florida	4
3	Northwestern	12
2	Boston College	11

Final; May 25; Gillette Stadium
1	North Carolina	12
3	Northwestern	8

- *First and second round host

== Tournament notes ==
The Boston College Eagles entered the tournament as the reigning national champions, after winning the national championship at the 2024 NCAA tournament. Boston College entered the tournament as the No. 2 seed in the tournament in its title defense season. However, the No. 1 overall seed in the tournament was earned by North Carolina. The Tar Heels defeated the Eagles once during the regular season, 12–11 at Dorrance Field in Chapel Hill, North Carolina and again in the ACC Tournament Final, 14–12 at American Legion Memorial Stadium in Charlotte, North Carolina.

Analysts and the media considered the national title favorite to be North Carolina, with Boston College, Northwestern and Florida being among the other contenders.

Among the top contenders for the national championship in 2025, Boston College was seeking back-to-back titles, North Carolina was looking for its fourth title, and first since 2022, Northwestern was playing for its ninth title and first since 2023, and Florida was hoping to win its first-ever national title.

North Carolina, Boston College, and Northwestern all earned first-round byes in the tournament.

== Record by Conference ==
Overview of conference performance in the 2025 NCAA Division I women's lacrosse tournament
Conference	# of Bids	Record	Win %	FR	SR	QF	SF	CG	NC
ACC	7	11–6	.647	7	7	3	2	1	–
Big Ten	4	6–3	.667	4	4	1	1	1	–
Big 12	1	3–1	.750	1	1	1	1	–	–
Ivy	4	6–4	.600	4	3	3	–	–	–
CAA	1	1–1	.500	1	1	–	–	–	–
Patriot	3	0–3	.000	3	–	–	–	–	–
American	1	0–1	.000	1	–	–	–	–	–
American East	1	0–1	.000	1	–	–	–	–	–
ASUN	1	0–1	.000	1	–	–	–	–	–
Atlantic 10	1	0–1	.000	1	–	–	–	–	–
Big East	1	0–1	.000	1	–	–	–	–	–
Big South	1	0–1	.000	1	–	–	–	–	–
MAAC	1	0–1	.000	1	–	–	–	–	–
MAC	1	0–1	.000	1	–	–	–	–	–
Northeast	1	0–1	.000	1	–	–	–	–	–
