= Amanda O'Leary =

American lacrosse player and coach

Current position
- Title: Head coach
- Team: Florida
- Conference: Big 12
- Record: 276–66 (.807)

Biographical details
- Born: 1967 (age 58–59)

Playing career
- 1985–1988: Temple
- Position: Midfielder

Coaching career (HC unless noted)
- 1994–2007: Yale
- 2010–present: Florida

Head coaching record
- Overall: 437–132 (.768)

Accomplishments and honors

Championships
- NCAA Final Four (2012, 2024, 2025); Ivy League Regular Season (2003); Big 12 Tournament (2025); Big 12 Regular Season (2025); 4x ALC Regular Season (2011-2014); 2x ALC Tournament (2012, 2014); 4x Big East Regular Season (2015-2018); 4x Big East Tournament (2015-2018); 4x AAC Regular Season (2019, 2021, 2022, 2024); 5x AAC Tournament (2019, 2021–2024)

Awards
- Field Hockey All-American (1986, 1987); Lacrosse All-American (1986, 1987, 1988); NCAA Midfielder of the Year (1987, 1988); Lacrosse Magazine Player of the Year (1988); NCAA Most Valuable Player (1988); USWLA Beth Allen Award (1997); All-Century Women's Lacrosse Team (1999); Temple Athletic Hall of Fame (2004); National Lacrosse Hall of Fame (2005); ALC Coach of the Year (2011)

Amanda Moore O'Leary (born 1967), née Amanda Moore and also known by her nickname Mandee O'Leary (and formerly, Mandee Moore), is an American college lacrosse coach and former player. O'Leary was an All-American lacrosse midfielder for the Temple Owls women's lacrosse team of Temple University, and she is a member of the US Lacrosse Hall of Fame. O'Leary was the head coach of the Yale Bulldogs women's lacrosse team of Yale University, and she is now the head coach of the Florida Gators women's lacrosse team of the University of Florida.

== Playing career ==
During her collegiate playing career, O'Leary was a four-year starter for Temple University's lacrosse and field hockey teams from 1985 to 1988. She was honored as a two-time first-team All-American in field hockey, and a three-time first-team All-American in lacrosse. O'Leary led the Temple women's lacrosse team to a perfect 19–0 record and an NCAA championship in 1988, and an appearance in the NCAA finals in 1987. She was named NCAA Midfielder of the Year in 1987 and 1988, and NCAA Most Valuable Player in 1988. Lacrosse Magazine recognized her as its player of the year.

After graduation, O'Leary played on the U.S. national lacrosse teams that won the International Federation of Women's Lacrosse Association (IFWLA) World Cup in 1989 and 1993. She played nine years of post-collegiate club lacrosse. O'Leary was named the USWLA's Beth Allen Award winner in 1997. She was elected to the US Lacrosse Hall of Fame in 2005.

== Coaching career ==
On June 22, 2007, the University of Florida announced that Amanda O'Leary would assume responsibility for the start-up Gators women's lacrosse program. Before accepting the Florida job, she spent the previous fourteen seasons as the head lacrosse coach at Yale University, winning the Coach of the Year honors in 1996. Through her final season at Yale, O'Leary compiled a 162–65 record as a head coach; her 162 wins and .714 winning percentage ranked seventh among all active coaches. O'Leary's Yale lacrosse teams qualified for the National Collegiate Athletic Association (NCAA) Tournament in 2003 and 2007. Her 2003 Yale team was the Ivy League tri-champion. Prior to coaching at Yale, she was an assistant coach at the University of Maryland and the University of Delaware.

O'Leary has also served as the chairman of the U.S. national team selection committee, and was a member of the United States Women's Lacrosse Association (USWLA) Board of Directors.

The new Gators women's lacrosse team officially began play on February 20, 2010, and now competes in the American Lacrosse Conference (ALC). O'Leary's first Gators recruiting class of twenty-four players featured seven US Lacrosse high school first-team All-Americans and six Under Armour high school All-Americans.

In only the second season of the Gators' lacrosse program, O'Leary's mostly-sophomore team clinched its first regular season ALC championship by defeating the defending conference champion and second-ranked Northwestern Wildcats 13–11 on April 14, 2011. The Gators completed a perfect 5–0 ALC season three days later by defeating the seventeenth-ranked Vanderbilt Commodores 8–7. O'Leary's Gators received their first invitation to the sixteen-team NCAA women's lacrosse tournament, defeating the Stanford Cardinal in the first round, before falling to the Duke Blue Devils in the NCAA quarterfinals. In their first five seasons of play, her upstart Gators have compiled an overall win–loss record of 81–21 (.794).

== Personal ==
O'Leary was born Amanda Moore in 1967. She grew up in Royersford, Pennsylvania, where she attended Spring-Ford High School. O'Leary graduated magna cum laude from Temple University with a bachelor's degree in exercise physiology and kinesiology in 1988. She is married to Kevin O'Leary, a former goaltender for the Maryland Terrapins and current NCAA referee official, and they are the parents of daughter Madison and son Ryan.

== Head coaching record ==
=== Women's lacrosse ===
Record table
Season	Team	Overall	Conference	Standing	Postseason
Yale Bulldogs (Ivy League) (1993–2007)
1993	Yale	6–8	0–6	7th	
1994	Yale	10–5	2–4	5th	
1995	Yale	14–2	2–2	3rd	
1996	Yale	10–4	4–2	3rd	
1997	Yale	12–5	4–2	T–3rd	
1998	Yale	12–4	4–3	3rd	
1999	Yale	14–4	5–2	3rd	
2000	Yale	11–5	4–3	4th	
2001	Yale	10–6	5–2	T–3rd	
2002	Yale	11–5	5–2	3rd	
2003	Yale	14–4	6–1	T–1st	NCAA Quarterfinals
2004	Yale	12–4	5–2	3rd	
2005	Yale	10–6	4–3	T–3rd	
2006	Yale	9–7	3–4	T–5th	
2007	Yale	13–4	6–1	2nd	NCAA First Round
Yale:		168–73	59–39		
Florida Gators (American Lacrosse Conference) (2010–2014)
2010	Florida	10–8	1–4	5th	
2011	Florida	16–4	5–0	1st	NCAA Quarterfinals
2012	Florida	20–3	5–0	1st	NCAA Semifinal
2013	Florida	18–3	4–1	T–1st	NCAA Quarterfinals
2014	Florida	18–3	6–0	1st	NCAA Quarterfinals
Florida Gators (Big East Conference) (2015–2018)
2015	Florida	15–5	6–1	T–1st	NCAA Second Round
2016	Florida	18–2	7–0	1st	NCAA Second Round
2017	Florida	17–3	9–0	1st	NCAA Second Round
2018	Florida	17–4	9–0	1st	NCAA Quarterfinals
Florida Gators (American Athletic Conference) (2019–2024)
2019	Florida	14–7	5–0	1st	NCAA Second Round
2020	Florida	6–2	0–0		Season canceled in progress
2021	Florida	18–3	10–0	1st	NCAA Quarterfinals
2022	Florida	17–5	5–0	1st	NCAA Quarterfinals
2023	Florida	17–4	5–1	2nd	NCAA Second Round
2024	Florida	20–3	6–0	1st	NCAA Semifinal
Florida Gators (Big 12 Conference) (2025–present)
2025	Florida	20–3	5–0	1st	NCAA Semifinal
2026	Florida	15–4	5–0		NCAA First Round
2027	Florida	0–0	0–0		
Florida:		276–66	83–7		
Total:		437–132			
National champion Postseason invitational champion Conference regular season champion Conference regular season and conference tournament champion Division regular season champion Division regular season and conference tournament champion Conference tournament champion

== See also ==
- Florida Gators
- History of the University of Florida
- Lacrosse in Pennsylvania
- List of Temple University people
- Temple Owls
- University Athletic Association
- Women's Lacrosse
- Yale Bulldogs
