= 2018 NCAA Division I women's lacrosse tournament =

- Dates: May 11–27, 2018
- Teams: 27
- Finals site: Kenneth P. LaValle Stadium, Stony Brook, NY
- Champions: James Madison (1st title)
- Runner-up: Boston College (2nd title game)
- Semifinalists: Maryland (26th Final Four); North Carolina (10th Final Four)
- Winning coach: Shelley Klaes-Bawcombe (1st title)
- MOP: Haley Warden, James Madison

The 2018 NCAA Division I Women's Lacrosse Championship is the 37th annual single-elimination tournament to determine the national champion of Division I NCAA women's college lacrosse. The semifinal and championship rounds will be played at Kenneth P. LaValle Stadium in Stony Brook, New York from May 25–27, 2018. All other rounds were played at campus sites, usually at the home field of the higher-seeded team, from May 11–20.

== Tournament field ==
All NCAA Division I women's lacrosse programs were eligible for this championship, and a total of 27 teams were invited to participate. 14 teams qualified automatically by winning their conference tournaments while the remaining 13 teams qualified at-large based on their regular season records.

=== Teams ===
Seed	School	Conference	Berth Type	RPI	Record
1	Maryland	Big Ten	Automatic	2	18-1
2	North Carolina	ACC	Automatic	1	15-3
3	James Madison	CAA	Automatic	4	18-1
4	Boston College	ACC	At-large	3	19-1
5	Stony Brook	America East	Automatic	6	19-0
6	Florida	Big East	Automatic	5	16-3
7	Towson	CAA	At-large	7	15-4
8	Loyola (MD)	Patriot	At-large	10	15-4
	Colorado	Pac-12	At-large	12	13-5
	Denver	Big East	At-large	16	12-6
	Fairfield	MAAC	Automatic	50	13-6
	Georgetown	Big East	At-large	17	12-6
	High Point	Big South	Automatic	18	17-2
	Jacksonville	Atlantic Sun	Automatic	43	16-3
	Johns Hopkins	Big Ten	At-large	22	10-8
	Mercer	SoCon	Automatic	85	9-10
	Navy	Patriot	Automatic	8	16-3
	Northwestern	Big Ten	At-large	9	13-5
	Penn	Ivy	At-large	11	13-4
	Penn State	Big Ten	At-large	21	10-9
	Princeton	Ivy	Automatic	13	12-5
	Richmond	Atlantic 10	Automatic	23	16-3
	Stanford	Pac-12	Automatic	14	15-4
	Syracuse	ACC	At-large	19	9-9
	Virginia	ACC	At-large	20	9-9
	Virginia Tech	ACC	At-large	15	13-6
	Wagner	Northeast	Automatic	58	13-5

== Bracket ==
=== Play-in game ===
Play In; May 9th
Wagner	13
Mercer	9

First Round; May 11; Regional Campus Sites
Denver	19
High Point	10
Navy	16
Johns Hopkins	9
Fairfield	2
8	Loyola (MD)*	18
Penn	15**
Penn State	14
Princeton	12**
Syracuse	11
Stanford	3
Virginia	12
Colorado	23
Jacksonville	18
7	Towson*	16
Wagner	6
Northwestern	24
Richmond	18
Virginia Tech	13
Georgetown	10

Second Round; May 13; Regional Campus Sites
1	Maryland*	15
Denver	4
Navy	19
8	Loyola (MD)	15
5	Stony Brook*	18
Penn	5
Princeton	10
4	Boston College*	16
3	James Madison*	15
Virginia	12
Colorado	9
6	Florida*	13
7	Towson	17
Northwestern	21
Virginia Tech	8
2	North Carolina*	17

Quarterfinals; May 19; Campus Sites
1	Maryland	17
Navy	15
5	Stony Brook	11
4	Boston College	12**
3	James Madison	11
6	Florida	8
Northwestern	14
2	North Carolina	19

Semifinals; May 25; Kenneth P. LaValle Stadium
1	Maryland	13
4	Boston College	15
3	James Madison	15
2	North Carolina	12

Final; May 27; Kenneth P. LaValle Stadium
4	Boston College	15
3	James Madison	16

- *First and second round host.

== See also ==
- NCAA Division II Women's Lacrosse Championship
- NCAA Division III Women's Lacrosse Championship
