= Navy Midshipmen women's lacrosse =

NCAA Division I college lacrosse team

- Founded: 2008
- University: United States Naval Academy
- Head coach: Cindy Timchal (since 2008 season)
- Stadium: Navy–Marine Corps Memorial Stadium (capacity: 34,000)
- Location: Annapolis, Maryland
- Conference: Patriot League
- Nickname: Midshipmen
- Colors: Navy blue and gold

NCAA Tournament Final Fours
- 2017

NCAA Tournament Quarterfinals
- 2017, 2018, 2026

NCAA Tournament appearances
- 2010, 2011, 2012, 2013, 2017, 2018, 2019, 2025, 2026

Conference Tournament championships
- 2010, 2011, 2012, 2013, 2017, 2018, 2025, 2026

Conference regular season championships
- 2010, 2012, 2013, 2025

The Navy Midshipmen women's lacrosse team is an NCAA Division I college lacrosse team representing the United States Naval Academy as part of the Patriot League. They play their home games at Navy-Marine Corps Memorial Stadium in Annapolis, Maryland. The Midshipmen are led by head coach Cindy Timchal.

== Head coach ==
The Midshipmen are currently led by hall of fame coach Cindy Timchal, who was named the team's inaugural head coach on August 5, 2006, and has guided the team since its 2008 inception. Timchal is the winningest coach in NCAA Division I women's lacrosse history, earning her 600th win on March 10, 2026.

A 1976 graduate of West Chester University, Timchal began coaching as an assistant lacrosse and field hockey coach at the University of Pennsylvania in 1979. Her first Division I head coach gig was at Northwestern University in 1982. She led the Wildcats to 5 NCAA Tournaments in nine seasons. In 1991 Timchal moved to the University of Maryland, where she transformed a school with one national title in its first eight seasons into a national juggernaut. In 16 seasons, Timchal won eight national titles, reached eleven title games, and made the NCAA Tournament every year.

== History ==
Navy began competition in NCAA Division I women's lacrosse for the 2008 season. The program has been led since its founding by head coach Cindy Timchal.

Timchal's Midshipmen made an immediate impact. After coaching the club team to an 18–5 record in 2007, Navy made the jump to Division I the next year in 2008 and has won at least 13 games in each of its first ten seasons. Navy broke through in 2010, capturing the Patriot League title for its first NCAA Tournament appearance. They beat Sacred Heart in the play-in game before falling to North Carolina in the first round to finish the year 17–4 with a #19 national ranking. This began a stretch of four straight conference titles and NCAA appearances.

The Midshipmen won play-in games three years in a row from 2010 to 2012 and added a first-round victory over Monmouth in 2013. For those four years, Navy's dominance in the Patriot League was hardly contested—they went 21–3 in league play with three regular season titles and four tournament titles.

However, Loyola joined the league in 2014, led by its own all-star coach, Jen Adams. Adams was Timchal's star player at Maryland from 1998 to 2001, as they had captured four straight national titles together and Adams still holds many Maryland scoring records. Loyola instantly dominated the league, winning three straight conference and tournament titles, preventing the Midshipmen from qualifying again from 2014 to 2016. Loyola completed its fourth straight unbeaten Patriot League regular season in 2017, and faced Navy in the tournament final. The Midshipmen stunned the Greyhounds 15–5, ending Loyola's 41-game unbeaten streak against PL teams. This win kicked off a Cinderella run for the Midshipmen, who defeated three teams in the NCAA tournament--#7 Penn, Massachusetts, and #2 North Carolina—before falling 16–14 to fellow underdog Boston College in the national semifinals (Final 4) in 2017. Navy's run marked the first time a women's service academy team had made a Division I national semifinal, and the Midshipmen ended the year 18–5, ranked #4 in the final Inside Lacrosse Media Poll and #6 in the IWLCA Coaches Poll.

In 2018, Navy appeared in the NCAA tournament quarterfinals, losing to #2 Maryland 17-15.

In 2025, the Midshipmen made their 8th NCAA tournament appearance after winning the Patriot League championship 14-13 over Loyola in overtime. Navy lost in the NCAA tournament first round 11-8 to Clemson.

In 2026, Navy appeared in its 9th NCAA tournament after winning the Patriot League title over #13 Army 17-11. In the NCAA tournament, they defeated UMass 17-16 in the first round and #9 Syracuse 11-10 (OT) in the second round to advance to the NCAA tournament quarterfinals. This marked their third Elite 8 appearance and first since 2018.

== Individual career records ==
Record	Amount	Player	Years
Goals	224	Jenna Collins	2015–18
Assists	177	Kelly Larkin	2017–20
Points	376	Kelly Larkin	2017–20
Ground balls	181	Marie Valenti	2016–19
Draw controls	504	Alyssa Daley	2022–25
Caused turnovers	114	Marie Valenti	2016–19
Saves	428	Ingrid Boyum	2015–18
Save %	.470	Jo Torres	2021–22
GAA	6.87	Annie Foky	2012–15

== Individual single-season records ==
Record	Amount	Player	Year
Goals	84	Alyssa Chung	2026
Assists	71	Jasmine DePompeo	2013
Points	127	Jasmine DePompeo	2013
Ground balls	55	Caitlin Mandrin Hill	2008
Draw controls	236	Alyssa Daley	2025
Caused turnovers	38	Blake Smith	2017
Saves	155 (2)	Jo Torres; Ingrid Boyum	2022; 2018
Save %	.484	Michelle Verbeeck	2012
GAA	4.97	Annie Foky	2014

== Seasons ==
Record table
Season	Coach	Overall	Conference	Standing	Postseason
NCAA Division I (Patriot League) (2008–present)
2008	Cindy Timchal	13–4	4–2	T-3rd	
2009	Cindy Timchal	13–5	4–2	T-2nd	
2010	Cindy Timchal	17–4	5–1	T-1st	NCAA First Round
2011	Cindy Timchal	15–6	4–2	3rd	NCAA First Round
2012	Cindy Timchal	18–3	6–0	1st	NCAA First Round
2013	Cindy Timchal	19–2	6–0	1st	NCAA Second Round
2014	Cindy Timchal	14–3	6–2	2nd	
2015	Cindy Timchal	15–5	6–2	3rd	
2016	Cindy Timchal	13–6	7–2	2nd	
2017	Cindy Timchal	18–5	8–1	2nd	NCAA Semifinals
2018	Cindy Timchal	18–4	8–1	2nd	NCAA Quarterfinals
2019	Cindy Timchal	16-5	8–1	2nd	NCAA 2nd round
2020	Cindy Timchal	2-4	0-0	N/A	Season shortened by COVID-19
2021	Cindy Timchal	8-4	4-2 (2-2 South)	3rd	
2022	Cindy Timchal	15-5	7-2	3rd	
2023	Cindy Timchal	13-6	6-3	3rd	
2024	Cindy Timchal	15-4	8-1	2nd	
2025	Cindy Timchal	15-6	7-2	3rd	NCAA 1st round
2026	Cindy Timchal	20-2	8-1	2nd	NCAA Quarterfinals
Total:		277–83 (.769)			
National champion Postseason invitational champion Conference regular season champion Conference regular season and conference tournament champion Division regular season champion Division regular season and conference tournament champion Conference tournament champion

== Postseason Results ==
The Midshipmen have appeared in 9 NCAA tournaments.

Year	Seed	Round	Opponent	Score
2010	–	Play-in; First Round	Sacred Heart #3 North Carolina	W, 12–2; L, 5–18
2011	–	Play-in; First Round	Quinnipiac #1 Maryland	W, 20–5; L, 6–19
2012	–	Play-in; First Round	Oregon #5 North Carolina	W, 10–9 (ot); L, 7–14
2013	#8	First Round; Second Round	Monmouth; Duke	W, 12–6; L, 5–10
2017	–	First Round; Second Round; Quarterfinal; Semifinal	#7 Penn; Massachusetts #2 North Carolina; Boston College	W, 11–10; W, 23–11; W, 16–14; L, 15–16
2018	–	First Round; Second Round; Quarterfinal	Johns Hopkins #8 Loyola #1 Maryland	W, 16–9; W, 19–15; L, 15–17
2019	--	First Round; Second Round	High Point #6 Virginia	W, 16–5; L, 12–15
2025	--	First Round	Clemson	L, 8-11
2026	#6	First Round; Second Round; Quarterfinals	UMass; Syracuse #3 Maryland	W, 17-16; W, 11-10; L, 10-14
