= Richmond Spiders women's lacrosse =

- Founded: 1983; 43 years ago
- University: University of Richmond
- Head coach: Anne Harrington
- Stadium: Robins Stadium
- Location: Richmond, Virginia
- Conference: A-10
- Nickname: Spiders
- Colors: Blue and red

NCAA Tournament appearances
- 2005, 2006, 2007, 2018, 2019, 2023, 2024

Conference Tournament championships
- 2005, 2006, 2007, 2018, 2019, 2023, 2024

The Richmond Spiders women's lacrosse team represents the University of Richmond in Richmond, Virginia. The Spiders are led by head coach Anne Harrington. Richmond plays their home games at Robins Stadium. Richmond currently competes as a member of the Atlantic 10 conference.

== History ==
Richmond women's lacrosse played their first season in 1983, finishing with a 6–4 record under head coach Janet Grubbs.

In the 2005, 2006, and 2007 seasons, the Spiders made three consecutive appearances in the NCAA tournament.

The Spiders returned to the NCAA tournament in 2018, after an 11 year absence, losing to Northwestern 24-18 in the first round.

Richmond made a second straight NCAA tournament appearance in 2019, losing to Loyola 19-6.

In 2023, the Spiders returned to the NCAA tournament after a four year absence, winning the program's first ever NCAA tournament game over Marquette 18-8. In the second round, they lost to North Carolina 16-12.

In 2024, Richmond defeated UMass 14-13 to win the 2024 Atlantic 10 tournament and earn the conference's NCAA tournament automatic berth. In the NCAA tournament first round, they lost to Penn 16-5.
