= Mercer Bears women's lacrosse =

- Founded: 2015; 11 years ago
- University: Mercer University
- Head coach: Samantha Eustace
- Conference: Big South Conference
- Nickname: Bears
- Colors: Black and orange

NCAA Tournament appearances
- 2018, 2019, 2021, 2022, 2023, 2024, 2025, 2026

Conference Tournament championships
- 2018, 2019, 2021, 2022, 2023, 2024, 2025, 2026

Conference regular season championships
- 2022, 2023, 2024, 2025, 2026

The Mercer Bears women's lacrosse team represents Mercer University. The Bears are led by head coach Samantha Eustace. Mercer competes in the Big South Conference.

== History ==
The Bears played their first season in 2015, finishing with a 5-9 record under head coach Eve Levinson. They began competing as members of the ASUN conference.

On July 31, 2015, Levinson resigned as Mercer women's lacrosse head coach. In August 2015, Mercer named Samantha Eustace as the next head coach of its women's lacrosse program.

In the 2018 season, the Bears became members of the SoCon for women’s lacrosse.

In May 2018, Mercer won the program's first-ever SoCon championship and made the program's first NCAA tournament appearance. Despite a 9-11 overall record, the Bears defeated Furman in the title game. In the 2018 NCAA Division I women's lacrosse tournament, Mercer lost to Wagner 13-9 in Staten Island, New York.

Despite a 10-10 record in the 2019 season, the Bears again won both games in the SoCon tournament, beating Furman 15-14 (2OT) to win the SoCon title. In the 2019 NCAA Division I women's lacrosse tournament, Mercer lost to Jacksonville 22-7 in the opening round.

Due to the COVID-19 pandemic, the Bears 2020 season was cut short, ending in March 2020 with a 5-2 record at the time the season was cancelled.

The 2021 season was the third consecutive SoCon tournament title for the Bears and the last season in the conference. Finishing with a 7-8 overall record, Mercer narrowly defeated Furman 14-13 to win the conference title. In the NCAA tournament, they lost to Florida 23-5 in the first round.

In the 2022 season, Mercer joined the Big South Conference for women's lacrosse. The move was announced on June 7, 2021.

In 2022, the Bears broke program records at the time by winning the most games in program history (14) and winning a conference regular season championship. Mercer won the Big South tournament title following a 16-13 win over High Point. In the NCAA tournament, the Bears lost to Florida 19-12.

The Bears won 17 games in the 2023 season, again breaking the program wins record. For a 2nd straight season they were conference regular season and tournament champions in the Big South. Mercer lost to Notre Dame in the NCAA tournament 1st round.

The 2024 Mercer team went 14-6 overall, defeating High Point 16-12 in the Big South championship game. In the NCAA tournament, Mercer lost 17-6 to Michigan.

In 2025, the Bears continued their dominance in the Big South, winning a fourth consecutive Big South tournament title. Finishing 12-8 overall they lost to Florida 18-6.

In 2026, Mercer won a fifth consecutive Big South regular season and tournament title. The Bears were an unbeaten 8-0 in conference regular season play. They defeated #2 High Point in the conference title game 14-11. In the NCAA tournament they lost to Michigan 18-8.
