= Jacksonville Dolphins women's lacrosse =

- Founded: 2010; 16 years ago
- University: Jacksonville University
- Head coach: Tara Singleton (since 2023 season)
- Stadium: Rock Stadium
- Location: Jacksonville, Florida
- Conference: Atlantic Sun Conference
- Nickname: Dolphins
- Colors: Green and white

NCAA Tournament appearances
- 2013, 2014, 2015, 2017, 2018, 2019, 2021, 2022, 2023, 2026

Conference Tournament championships
- 2012, 2013, 2014, 2015, 2017, 2018, 2019, 2021, 2022, 2023, 2026

Conference regular season championships
- 2011, 2013, 2014, 2015, 2016, 2017, 2018, 2019, 2021, 2022, 2025

The Jacksonville Dolphins women's lacrosse team is an NCAA Division I college lacrosse team representing Jacksonville University as part of the Atlantic Sun Conference (ASUN). They play their home games at Rock Stadium in Jacksonville, Florida.

== History ==
Jacksonville fielded its inaugural team in 2010 under founding head coach Mindy McCord, finishing with an 8–11 overall record.

Jacksonville has made NCAA tournament appearances in 2013, 2014, 2015, 2017, 2018, 2019, 2021, 2022, 2023, and 2026.

Jacksonville recorded its first-ever NCAA Tournament victory on May 14, 2021, when they defeated Vanderbilt 20–12.

== Individual career records ==
Record	Amount	Player	Years
Goals	278	Sarah Elms	2018–23
Assists	91	Alyssa Arnold	2018–22
Points	344	Sarah Elms	2018–23
Ground balls	152	Brittney Orashen	2012–15
Draw controls	501	Abby Moran	2023–26
Caused turnovers	105	Ashtyn Hiron	2015–18
Saves	510	Karli Tobin	2010–13
Save %*	.498	Paige Pagano	2022–24
GAA**	7.15	Paige Pagano	2022–24

*Minimum 30 saves
**Minimum 500 minutes

== Individual single-season records ==
Record	Amount	Player	Year
Goals	69 (2)	Ashtyn Hiron; Sarah Elms	2018; 2023
Assists	48	Grace Hobson	2023
Points	98	Ashtyn Hiron	2018
Ground balls	58	Erika Brager	2017
Draw controls	193	Abby Moran	2026
Caused turnovers	33	Ashtyn Hiron	2016
Saves	153	Karli Tobin	2010
Save %*	.585	Asia Moore	2013
GAA**	7.15	Paige Pagano	2022

*Minimum 20 saves
**Minimum 100 minutes

== Individual game records ==
Record	Amount	Player	Date
Goals	9	Sarah Elms	3/17/22
Assists	6 (4)	Grace Hobson, Alyssa Arnold, Jenny Kinsey, Ali Hoffman	4/8/23, 4/25/21, 4/14/18, 4/13/12
Points	10 (2)	Sarah Elms, Jenny Kinsey	3/17/22, 5/2/22
Ground balls	8 (2)	Erika Brager, Brittney Orashen	4/15/17, 3/2/13
Draw controls	20	Abby Moran	4/12/25
Caused turnovers	9	Erika Brager	4/15/17
Saves	18	Karli Tobin	5/1/10

== Seasons ==
Record table
Season	Coach	Overall	Conference	Standing	Postseason
NCAA Division I (National Lacrosse Conference) (2010–2012)
2010	Mindy McCord	8–11	4–2	3rd	
2011	Mindy McCord	14–5	7–0	1st	
2012	Mindy McCord	15–4	6–1	2nd	
NCAA Division I (Atlantic Sun Conference) (2013–present)
2013	Mindy McCord	13–6	4–0	1st	NCAA First Round
2014	Mindy McCord	14–6	5–0	1st	NCAA First Round
2015	Mindy McCord	17–3	7–0	1st	NCAA First Round
2016	Mindy McCord	13–5	8–0	1st	
2017	Mindy McCord	14–6	9–1	T-1st	NCAA First Round
2018	Mindy McCord	16–4	5–0	1st	NCAA First Round
2019	Mindy McCord	17–4	6–0	1st	NCAA First Round
2020	Mindy McCord	3–1	1–0		
2021	Mindy McCord	12–2	3–0	1st	NCAA Second Round
2022	Mindy McCord	14–5	5–0	1st	NCAA Second Round
2023	Tara Singleton	12–8	6–1	2nd	NCAA First Round
2024	Tara Singleton	9–9	6–0	1st	
2025	Tara Singleton	10–6	6–0	1st	
2026	Tara Singleton	13–6	7–1	2nd	NCAA First Round
Total:		214–91 (.702)			
National champion Postseason invitational champion Conference regular season champion Conference regular season and conference tournament champion Division regular season champion Division regular season and conference tournament champion Conference tournament champion
