= Florida Gators women's lacrosse =

- Founded: 2010
- University: University of Florida
- Head coach: Amanda O'Leary (15th season)
- Stadium: Donald R. Dizney Stadium (capacity: 1,500)
- Location: Gainesville, Florida
- Conference: Big 12 Conference
- Nickname: Gators
- Colors: Orange and blue

NCAA Tournament Final Fours
- 2012, 2024, 2025

NCAA Tournament Quarterfinals
- 2011, 2012, 2013, 2014, 2018, 2021, 2024, 2025

NCAA Tournament appearances
- 2011, 2012, 2013, 2014, 2015, 2016, 2017, 2018, 2019, 2021, 2022, 2023, 2024, 2025, 2026

Conference Tournament championships
- 2012, 2014, 2015, 2016, 2017, 2018, 2019, 2021, 2022, 2023, 2024, 2025

Conference regular season championships
- 2011, 2012, 2013, 2014, 2015, 2016, 2017, 2018, 2019, 2021, 2022, 2024, 2025, 2026

The Florida Gators women's lacrosse team represents the University of Florida in the sport of college lacrosse. The Gators compete in Division I of the National Collegiate Athletic Association (NCAA) and are single-sport members of the Big 12 Conference, which they joined after the 2024 season. Previously, the team had competed in the American Athletic Conference (The American), and before that the Big East Conference. Before joining Big East women's lacrosse, the Gators were members of the American Lacrosse Conference (ALC), which folded after the 2014 season due to aftereffects of conference realignment. They play their home games in Donald R. Dizney Stadium on the university's Gainesville, Florida campus, and are currently led by head coach Amanda O'Leary. The Gators have won regular-season conference titles in 11 of the 13 completed seasons of the women's lacrosse program's existence, (Note: The 2020 season was canceled due to the COVID-19 pandemic before any conference games were played.) with four each in the ALC and Big East plus three in The American. Additionally, they have won 10 conference tournament titles (two ALC, four Big East, four American) and advanced to the quarterfinals of the NCAA tournament six times (2011–2014, 2018, and 2021), with their best NCAA finish being a semifinal berth in 2012.

== Background and overview ==
The University Athletic Association (UAA) quickly proceeded from new idea to reality in the creation of its newest sports program—it decided to create a women's lacrosse program in 2005, publicly announced the new program in 2006, hired a head coach and joined a conference in 2007, and announced its first recruiting class and began construction of a dedicated lacrosse stadium in 2008. UAA officials selected women's lacrosse for its newest expansion sport because of the booming popularity of lacrosse at the high school level and the rapidly increasing competition available among Division I athletic programs.

Although the University of Florida is a long-time member of the Southeastern Conference (SEC) for the other 20 NCAA sports in which it fields varsity teams, the Florida Gators women's lacrosse team competed in the American Lacrosse Conference from 2011 through 2014. Among the other 13 SEC member schools, only Vanderbilt University currently sponsors a varsity women's lacrosse team. Following the dissolution of the ALC after the 2014 season, Florida and Vanderbilt joined the Big East Conference, as associate members in women's lacrosse only, starting with the 2015 season. In October 2017, The American announced that it would start a women's lacrosse league in the 2019 season, with Florida and Vanderbilt joining four full conference members.

The first Gators recruiting class of 24 players included seven US Lacrosse first-team high school All-Americans—Caroline Chesterman, Katie Ciaci, Brittany Dashiell, Samantha Farrell, Janine Hiller, Jamie Reeg and Julie Schindel, and US Lacrosse named another five as All-American Honorable Mentions—Ashley Bruns, Lelan Bailey, Jenna Hildebrand, Hayley Katzenberger and Mikey Meagher. Dashiell, Bruns and Farrell, plus Kitty Cullen, Colby Rhea and Haydon Judge, were also named Under Armour All-Americans. Amanda Wedekind was previously named an Under Armour All-American as a rising sophomore in 2006. The Gators' 2009–2010 recruiting class was rated best in the nation.

== Team history ==
The inaugural Florida Gators team played teams from fellow ALC member schools Johns Hopkins, Ohio State, Penn State, Vanderbilt and defending NCAA champion Northwestern, as well as non-conference opponents Cornell, Georgetown, Navy and New Hampshire during the spring 2010 semester. The Gators played their first regular season game on February 20, 2010, posting a 16–6 victory over the Jacksonville Dolphins. The young Gators finished their inaugural season 10–8, including ALC wins over Penn State and Johns Hopkins, and were ranked eighteenth in the country in LaxPower's final power ratings.

In only their second season of NCAA competition, the sixth-ranked Gators clinched their first ALC regular season championship by defeating the defending conference champion and second-ranked Northwestern Wildcats 13–11 on April 14, 2011. The Gators completed a perfect 5–0 ALC season three days later when they defeated the seventeenth-ranked Vanderbilt Commodores 8–7. The Northwestern Wildcats edged the Gators 10–9 in the ALC Tournament final, after the Gators defeated the Ohio State Buckeyes 16–13 in the semifinal round. The Gators received their first NCAA Tournament bid, seeded fourth in the sixteen-team field on May 9, 2011, and defeated the Stanford Cardinal women's team 13–11 in the first round of the NCAA tournament five days later. The young Gators eventually fell to the veteran Duke Blue Devils 13–9 in the quarterfinals ("Elite Eight") of the 2011 NCAA Tournament, finishing their second season with an overall win–loss record of 16–4.

In advance of the spring 2012 season, Lacrosse Magazine ranked the Gators as the preseason No. 2 team in the nation. After defeating the No. 1 ranked Northwestern Wildcats, the No. 5 Gators finished the 2012 regular season with a 15–2 overall win–loss record and a perfect 5–0 in the ALC, winning their second regular season conference championship in only their third year of play. The No. 3 Gators made it a clean sweep by trouncing the No. 1 Wildcats 14–7 in the final of the ALC Tournament, and winning their first-ever conference tournament title. Afterward, the Gators were selected as the No. 1 seed in the 2012 NCAA Division I women's lacrosse tournament. The Gators defeated the Albany Great Danes 6–4 in the opening round of the tournament, and overwhelmed the Penn State Nittany Lions 15–2 in the quarterfinals. After leading 12–5 in the tournament semifinal, the team's season ended with a 14–13 sudden-death loss to the Syracuse Orange in double-overtime.

== Coaching staff ==
Florida named Amanda O'Leary as its inaugural head coach on June 22, 2007. Before she became Florida's first head coach, O'Leary served as the head coach at Yale University for fourteen seasons, and was previously an assistant coach at the University of Maryland and the University of Delaware. As a collegiate player, O'Leary was honored as a two-time All-American midfielder at Temple University, where she led her Temple Owls team to an NCAA Championship in 1988.

Assistant coach Erica LaGrow is a fourth-year Gators assistant. She was a first-team All-Atlantic Coast Conference (ACC) midfielder for the North Carolina Tar Heels, and graduated from the University of North Carolina in 2008. LaGrow currently plays for the U.S. Women's Elite Lacrosse team, and was a key player on the U.S. national team that defeated Australia in the gold medal game of the 2009 Federation of International Lacrosse (FIL) Women's World Cup.

Assistant coach Caitlyn McFadden is a second-year Gators assistant. She played for the Maryland Terrapins, and graduated from the University of Maryland in 2010 after leading the Terps to the 2010 NCAA Championship. McFadden was an IWLCA first-team All-American midfielder in her junior and senior seasons. As a senior, she was the recipient of the Tewaarton Award and Honda Sports Award, and was named the ACC Player of the Year, the NCAA Tournament Most Valuable Player, and the IWLCA National Midfielder of the Year. The Maryland Terrapins sports program honored her with its Suzanne Tyler Award, given to the University of Maryland female athlete of the year.

== Donald R. Dizney Stadium ==
Completed during the summer of 2009, Donald R. Dizney Stadium hosts the Gators women's lacrosse team, as well as the women's soccer team. The facility includes a 1,500-seat stadium that runs the length of the game field. The $15 million construction cost was funded entirely by private donors. The facility also includes a second practice field, concessions stands, locker rooms, a training room, and other amenities. At the Gators' first home game, an overflow crowd of 2,214 was present in Dizney Stadium for the Gators' 16–6 win over the Jacksonville Dolphins.

== Year-by-year results ==
NCAA Division I Champions	Conference champions	Conference Tournament Champions

Season	League	Conference	Head Coach	Conference Record	Conference Ranking	Conference Tournament Results	Overall Record	Final Ranking	Postseason results
2010	NCAA	ALC	Amanda O'Leary	1–4	4th	Columbus; W 14–3 vs. Johns Hopkins; L 9–16 vs. Vanderbilt	10–8	RV	did not qualify
2011	NCAA	ALC	Amanda O'Leary	5–0	1st	Nashville; W 16–13 vs. Ohio State; L 9–10 vs. Northwestern	16–4	5	Gainesville; W 13–11 vs. Stanford; L 9–13 vs. Duke
2012	NCAA	ALC	Amanda O'Leary	5–0	1st	Gainesville; W 5–4 vs. Ohio State; W 14–7 vs. Northwestern	20–3	3	Gainesville; W 6–4 vs. Albany; W 15–2 vs. Penn State; Stony Brook; L 13–14 (OT) vs. Syracuse
2013	NCAA	ALC	Amanda O'Leary	4–1	T–1st	Baltimore; W 17–3 vs. Ohio State; L 3–8 vs. Northwestern	18–3	5	Gainesville; W 16–5 vs. Denver; Syracuse; L 9–13 vs. Syracuse
2014	NCAA	ALC	Amanda O'Leary	6–0	1st	Evanston; W 11–6 vs. Johns Hopkins; W 9–8 vs. Northwestern	18–3	6	Gainesville; W 16–5 vs. Denver; L 11–12 (OT) vs. Northwestern
2015	NCAA	Big East Conference	Amanda O'Leary	6–1	T–1st	Storrs; W 18–8 vs. Villanova; W 20–6 vs. Connecticut	15–5	12	Chapel Hill; W 15–10 vs. Stanford; L 6–11 vs. North Carolina
2016	NCAA	Big East Conference	Amanda O'Leary	7–0	1st	Washington; W 11–8 vs. Georgetown; W 16–4 vs. Temple	18–2	6	Gainesville; L 13–14 vs. Penn State (OT)
2017	NCAA	Big East Conference	Amanda O'Leary	9–0	1st	Philadelphia; W 21–9 vs. Temple; W 18–12 vs. Denver	17–3	9	Gainesville; L 12–15 vs. USC
2018	NCAA	Big East Conference	Amanda O'Leary	9–0	1st	Gainesville; W 19–8 vs. Marquette; W 18–6 vs. Denver	17–4	6	Gainesville; W 13–9 vs. Colorado; Harrisonburg; L 8–11 vs. James Madison
2019	NCAA	American	Amanda O'Leary	5–0	1st	Cincinnati; W 19–10 vs. Vanderbilt; W 15–9 vs. Cincinnati	13–6	13	Chapel Hill; W 16–9 vs. Johns Hopkins; L 11–15 vs. North Carolina
2020	NCAA	American	Amanda O'Leary	0–0	—N/a	—N/a	6–2	8 (Note: Ranking at the time of season cancellation.)	—N/a
2021	NCAA	American	Amanda O'Leary	10–0	1st	Gainesville; W 19–6 vs. Cincinnati; W 19–4 vs. Temple	18–3	7	Gainesville; W 23–5 vs. Mercer; W 17–3 vs. Jacksonville; Syracuse; L 11–17 vs. Syracuse
2022	NCAA	American	Amanda O'Leary	5–0	1st	Greenville; W 18–7 vs. East Carolina; W 18–7 vs. Vanderbilt	17–5	8	Gainesville; W 19–12 vs. Mercer; W 15–10 vs. Jacksonville; College Park; L 5–18 vs. Maryland
2023	NCAA	American	Amanda O'Leary	5–1	2nd	Greenville; W 12–9 vs. East Carolina; W 9–8 vs. James Madison	17–4	6	Gainesville; W 13–7 vs. Jacksonville; L 15–16 vs. Notre Dame
2024	NCAA	American	Amanda O'Leary	6–0	1st	Nashville; W 17–8 vs. Vanderbilt; W 21–11 vs. James Madison	20–3	4	Charlottesville; W 17–8 vs. North Carolina; W 13–8 vs. Virginia; College Park; W 15–9 vs. Maryland; Cary; L 11–15 vs. Northwestern
2025	NCAA	Big 12 Conference	Amanda O'Leary	5–0	1st	Boulder; W 22–2 vs. UC Davis; W 21–10 vs. Arizona State	20–3	4	Gainesville; W 18–6 vs. Mercer; W 13–12 (2OT) vs. Stanford; W 11–9 vs. Duke; Foxborough L 4–20 vs. North Carolina
2026	NCAA	Big 12 Conference	Amanda O'Leary	5–0	1st	Gainesville; W 22–7 vs. UC Davis; L 6–8 vs. Colorado	15–4	10	Boulder; L 8–18 vs. Denver
Total				98–7		30–4	295–67		22–15

== See also ==
- Florida Gators
- History of the University of Florida
- List of University of Florida Athletic Hall of Fame members
- University Athletic Association
- Women's lacrosse
