= 2013 Asia-Pacific Lacrosse Championship =

International lacrosse competition

Tournament details
- Host country: China
- Venues: 3 (in 1 host city)
- Dates: June 21–27

The 2013 Asia-Pacific Lacrosse Championships is an international lacrosse competition held in Beijing, China. Both a men's and women's tournament was held in this iteration of the Asia-Pacific Lacrosse Championship.

== Participating teams ==
Men's	Women's
Australia U23; China (hosts); Japan U22; Hong Kong; Singapore (Note: Not a APLU member at the time of the tournament.) (guests); South Korea; Thailand; (United States) USA Starz (Note: United States West Coast selection team) (guests)	Australia U23; China (hosts); Japan U21; South Korea; (United States) USA Starz (guests)

== Venues ==
Beijing		2013 Asia-Pacific Lacrosse Championship (China)
Olympic Sports Centre	China University of Geosciences Stadium	2013 Asia-Pacific Lacrosse Championship (China)
Capacity: 36,228	Capacity: N/A	2013 Asia-Pacific Lacrosse Championship (China)
China Lacrosse Association Ltd. Tournament Base		2013 Asia-Pacific Lacrosse Championship (China)
Capacity: N/A		2013 Asia-Pacific Lacrosse Championship (China)

== Men's ==
2013 Asia-Pacific Men's Lacrosse Championship
Tournament details
- Teams: 6

Final positions
- Champions: Japan U22
- Runners-up: Australia U23
- Third place: Thailand
- Fourth place: China

=== Round robin ===
Pos	Team	Pld	W	L	GF	GA	GD	Qualification
1	Japan U22	7	7	0	160	19	+141	Final
2	(United States) USA Starz (G)	7	6	1	77	24	+53	
3	Australia U23	7	5	2	82	40	+42	Final
4	China (H)	7	4	3	55	76	−21	Third place game
5	Thailand	7	3	4	43	74	−31	Third place game
6	South Korea	7	2	5	36	91	−55	Fifth place game
7	Singapore (G)	7	1	6	23	74	−51	
8	Hong Kong	7	0	7	17	95	−78	Fifth place game

Source: APLU
(G) Guests; (H) Hosts

June 21, 2013; 14:00	USA Starz (United States)	4–15 (1–6, 1–3, 1–3, 1–3)	Japan U22	CLAL Tournament Base, Beijing

Game reference

June 21, 2013	Hong Kong	7–9	Thailand

Game reference

June 21, 2013	Australia U23	18–5	Singapore

Game reference

June 21, 2013	South Korea	8–14	China

Game reference

June 22, 2013	Hong Kong	1–19	Australia U23

Game reference

June 22, 2013	Thailand	14–4	Singapore

Game reference

June 22, 2013; 14:00	China	4–29 (1–7, 1–5, 0–10, 2–7)	Japan U22	CLAL Tournament Base, Beijing

Game reference

June 22, 2013	South Korea	1–20	(United States) USA Starz

Game reference

June 23, 2013	Hong Kong	2–5	South Korea

Game reference

June 23, 2013	Thailand	6–10	China

Game reference

June 23, 2013	Australia U23	1–5	(United States) USA Starz

Game reference

June 23, 2013; 12:00	Singapore	1–14 (0–4, 0–3, 1–4, 0–4)	Japan U22	CLAL Tournament Base, Beijing

Game reference

June 23, 2013	Hong Kong	3–6	China

Game reference

June 23, 2013	Thailand	8–4	South Korea

Game reference

June 23, 2013	Singapore	0–6	(United States) USA Starz

Game reference

June 23, 2013; 16:00	Australia U23	3–16 (0–2, 2–3, 1–6, 0–5)	Japan U22	CLAL Tournament Base, Beijing

Game reference

June 24, 2013	Singapore	5–11	South Korea

Game reference

June 24, 2013; 12:00	Hong Kong	0–36 (0–8, 0–11, 0–8, 0–9)	Japan U22	CLAL Tournament Base, Beijing

Game reference

June 24, 2013	Thailand	1–16	(United States) USA Starz

Game reference

June 24, 2013	Australia U23	16–8	China

Game reference

June 25, 2013; 12:10	South Korea	6–29 (1–6, 1–10, 2–6, 1–7)	Japan U22	China University of Geosciences Stadium, Beijing

Game reference

June 25, 2013	Australia U23	12–4	Thailand

Game reference

June 25, 2013	Hong Kong	2–3	Singapore

Game reference

June 25, 2013	USA Starz (United States)	9–4	China

Game reference

June 26, 2013	Hong Kong	2–17	(United States) USA Starz

Game reference

June 26, 2013	South Korea	1–13	Australia U23

Game reference

June 26, 2013; 16:00	Thailand	1–21 (0–7, 0–7, 1–6, 0–1)	Japan U22	China University of Geosciences Stadium, Beijing

Game reference

June 26, 2013	China	9–5	Singapore

Game reference

=== Final round ===
==== Exhibition game ====
June 27, 2013	Singapore	1–14	(United States) USA Starz

Game reference

==== 5th place game ====
June 27, 2013	South Korea	7–5	Hong Kong

Game reference

==== 3rd place game ====
June 27, 2013	China	9–11	Thailand

Game reference

==== Final ====
June 27, 2013; 15:00	Japan U22	15–5 (4–2, 1–1, 5–2, 5–0)	Australia U23	Olympic Sports Centre, Beijing

Game reference

== Women's ==
2013 Asia-Pacific Women's Lacrosse Championship
Tournament details
- Teams: 5

Final positions
- Champions: Japan U21
- Runners-up: Australia U23
- Third place: South Korea
- Fourth place: China

=== Round robin ===
Pos	Team	Pld	W	L	GF	GA	GD	Qualification
1	Japan U21	4	4	0	116	19	+97	Semifinals
2	Australia U23	4	3	1	86	20	+66	Semifinals
3	South Korea	4	2	2	40	56	−16	Semifinals
4	(United States) USA Starz (G)	4	1	3	27	75	−48	
5	China (H)	4	0	4	0	99	−99	Semifinals

Source: APLU
(G) Guests; (H) Hosts

June 21, 2013	Australia U23	23–6	South Korea

Game reference

June 21, 2013; 16:00	USA Starz (United States)	4–35 (2–17, 2–18)	Japan U21	CLAL Tournament Base, Beijing

Game reference

June 22, 2013	South Korea	15–8	(United States) USA Starz

Game reference

June 22, 2013; 16:00	China	0–43 (0–27, 0–16)	Japan U21	CLAL Tournament Base, Beijing

Game reference

June 23, 2013	Australia U23	25–1	(United States) USA Starz

Game reference

June 23, 2013	South Korea	14–0	China

Game reference

June 24, 2013; 12:00	Japan U21	25–5 (15–2, 10–3)	South Korea	CLAL Tournament Base, Beijing

Game reference

June 24, 2013	Australia U23	28–0	China

Game reference

June 25, 2013	Australia U23	10–13 (4–7, 6–6)	Japan U21	China University of Geosciences Stadium, Beijing

Game reference

June 25, 2013	USA Starz (United States)	14–0	China

Game reference

=== Final round ===
Semifinals
R2	Australia U23	14
R3	South Korea	2
R1	Japan U21	33
R5	China	0

Final
R1	Japan U21	15
R2	Australia U23	10
Bronze medal game
R3	South Korea	W
R5	China	L

==== Semifinals ====
June 26, 2013	Australia U23	14–2	South Korea

Game reference

June 26, 2013; 14:00	Japan U21	33–0 (17–0, 16–0)	China	China University of Geosciences Stadium, Beijing

Game reference

==== 3rd place game ====
June 27, 2013	South Korea	W–L	China

Game reference

==== Final ====
June 27, 2013; 13:00	Japan U21	15–10 (4–2, 1–1, 5–2, 5–0)	Australia U23	Olympic Sports Centre, Beijing

Game reference

== Final standings ==
Men's		Women's	
Rank	Team	Rank	Team
1st place, gold medalist(s)	Japan U22	1st place, gold medalist(s)	Japan U21
2nd place, silver medalist(s)	Australia U23	2nd place, silver medalist(s)	Australia U23
3rd place, bronze medalist(s)	Thailand	3rd place, bronze medalist(s)	South Korea
4	China	4	China
5	South Korea		
6	Hong Kong		

- APLU members only
