= 2011 Asia-Pacific Lacrosse Championship =

International lacrosse competition

Tournament details
- Host country: New Zealand
- Dates: July 3–8

The 2011 Asia-Pacific Lacrosse Championships is an international lacrosse competition held in Auckland, New Zealand. Both a men's and women's tournament was held in this iteration of the Asia-Pacific Lacrosse Championship.

== Participating teams ==
Men's	Women's
Australia U23; Hong Kong; Japan U22; New Zealand (hosts); (Australia) Lax Ratz (guests); (United States) USA West (Note: Selection under-21 team from the West Coast) (guests)	Australia U23; Hong Kong; Japan U22; South Korea; New Zealand U19 (hosts); (New Zealand) Kiwi All Starz (guests)

== Venue ==
Auckland
College Refles Sports Club	2011 Asia-Pacific Lacrosse Championship (New Zealand)

== Men's ==
2011 Asia-Pacific Men's Lacrosse Championship
Tournament details
- Teams: 4

Final positions
- Champions: Japan U22
- Runners-up: Australia U23
- Third place: New Zealand
- Fourth place: Hong Kong

=== Round robin ===
Pos	Team	Pld	W	L	GF	GA	GD	Qualification
1	Japan U22	5	5	0	62	25	+37	Final
2	Australia U23	5	4	1	79	21	+58	Final
3	(United States) USA West	5	3	2	46	42	+4	Third place game
4	New Zealand	5	2	3	43	50	−7	Third place game
5	(Australia) Lax Ratz	5	1	4	48	55	−7	Fifth place game
6	Hong Kong	5	0	5	20	105	−85	Fifth place game

Source: NZLA

July 3, 2011	Japan U22	10–7	New Zealand	College Refles Sports Club, Auckland

Game reference

July 3, 2011	Australia U23	30–1	Hong Kong	College Refles Sports Club, Auckland

Game reference

July 3, 2011	USA West (United States)	11–10	(Australia) Lax Ratz	College Refles Sports Club, Auckland

Game reference

July 4, 2011	Japan U22	14–7	(Australia) Lax Ratz	College Refles Sports Club, Auckland

Game reference

July 4, 2011	Hong Kong	4–20	(United States) USA West	College Refles Sports Club, Auckland

Game reference

July 4, 2011	New Zealand	2–15	Australia	College Refles Sports Club, Auckland

Game reference

July 5, 2011	Lax Ratz (Australia)	19–6	Hong Kong	College Refles Sports Club, Auckland

Game reference

July 5, 2011	New Zealand	8–9	(United States) USA West	College Refles Sports Club, Auckland

Game reference

July 5, 2011	Japan U22	13–5	Australia U23	College Refles Sports Club, Auckland

Game reference

July 6, 2011	New Zealand	15–6	Hong Kong	College Refles Sports Club, Auckland

Game reference

July 6, 2011	Australia U23	13–2	(Australia) Lax Ratz	College Refles Sports Club, Auckland

Game reference

July 6, 2011	USA West (United States)	3–4	Japan U22	College Refles Sports Club, Auckland

Game reference

July 7, 2011	Australia U23	16–3	(United States) USA West	College Refles Sports Club, Auckland

Game reference

July 7, 2011	Hong Kong	3–21	Japan U22	College Refles Sports Club, Auckland

Game reference

July 7, 2011	Lax Ratz (Australia)	10–11	New Zealand	College Refles Sports Club, Auckland

Game reference

=== Final round ===
==== 5th place game ====
July 8, 2011	Lax Ratz (Australia)	9–4	Hong Kong	College Refles Sports Club, Auckland

Game reference

==== 3rd place game ====
July 8, 2011	USA West (United States)	9–8	New Zealand	College Refles Sports Club, Auckland

Game reference

==== Final ====
July 8, 2011	Japan U22	10–9	Australia U23	College Refles Sports Club, Auckland

Game reference

== Women's ==
2011 Asia-Pacific Women's Lacrosse Championship
Tournament details
- Teams: 5

Final positions
- Champions: Japan U22
- Runners-up: Australia U23
- Third place: New Zealand U19
- Fourth place: Hong Kong

=== Round robin ===
Pos	Team	Pld	W	L	GF	GA	GD	Qualification
1	Japan U22	5	5	0	153	12	+141	Final
2	Australia U23	5	4	1	102	28	+74	Final
3	New Zealand U19	5	3	2	45	58	−13	Third place game
4	(New Zealand) Kiwi All Starz	5	2	3	51	67	−16	Third place game
5	Hong Kong	5	1	4	33	106	−73	Fifth place game
6	South Korea	5	0	5	24	137	−113	Fifth place game

Source: NZLA

July 3, 2011	Australia U23	32–1	Hong Kong	College Refles Sports Club, Auckland

Game reference

July 3, 2011	South Korea	3–17	New Zealand U19	College Refles Sports Club, Auckland

Game reference

July 3, 2011	Japan U22	29–3	(New Zealand) Kiwi All Starz	College Refles Sports Club, Auckland

Game reference

July 4, 2011	South Korea	6–22	(New Zealand) Kiwi All Starz	College Refles Sports Club, Auckland

Game reference

July 4, 2011	Hong Kong	5–14	New Zealand U19	College Refles Sports Club, Auckland

Game reference

July 4, 2011	Australia U23	4–17	Japan U22	College Refles Sports Club, Auckland

Game reference

July 5, 2011	Kiwi All Starz (New Zealand)	16–6	Hong Kong	College Refles Sports Club, Auckland

Game reference

July 5, 2011	Japan U22	45–1	South Korea	College Refles Sports Club, Auckland

Game reference

July 5, 2011	New Zealand U19	1–17	Australia U23	College Refles Sports Club, Auckland

Game reference

July 6, 2011	Hong Kong	0–34	Japan U22	College Refles Sports Club, Auckland

Game reference

July 6, 2011	South Korea	4–32	Australia U23	College Refles Sports Club, Auckland

Game reference

July 6, 2011	New Zealand U19	9–5	(New Zealand) Kiwi All Starz	College Refles Sports Club, Auckland

Game reference

July 7, 2011	Kiwi All Starz (New Zealand)	5–17	Australia U23	College Refles Sports Club, Auckland

Game reference

July 7, 2011	Japan U22	28–4	New Zealand U19	College Refles Sports Club, Auckland

Game reference

July 7, 2011	Hong Kong	21–10	South Korea	College Refles Sports Club, Auckland

Game reference

=== Final round ===
==== 5th place game ====
July 8, 2011	Hong Kong	24–18	South Korea	College Refles Sports Club, Auckland

Game reference

==== 3rd place game ====
July 8, 2011	New Zealand U19	6–14	(New Zealand) Kiwi All Starz	College Refles Sports Club, Auckland

Game reference

==== Final ====
July 8, 2011	Japan U22	20–6	Australia U23	College Refles Sports Club, Auckland

Game reference

== Final standings ==
=== Overall ===
Men's		Women's	
Rank	Team	Rank	Team
1st place, gold medalist(s)	Japan U22	1st place, gold medalist(s)	Japan U22
2nd place, silver medalist(s)	Australia U23	2nd place, silver medalist(s)	Australia U23
3rd place, bronze medalist(s)	South Korea	3rd place, bronze medalist(s)	(New Zealand) Kiwi All Starz
4	(United States) USA West	4	New Zealand U19
5	(Australia) Lax Ratz	5	Hong Kong
6	Hong Kong	6	South Korea

=== APLU members only ===
Men's		Women's	
Rank	Team	Rank	Team
1st place, gold medalist(s)	Japan U22	1st place, gold medalist(s)	Japan U22
2nd place, silver medalist(s)	Australia U23	2nd place, silver medalist(s)	Australia U23
3rd place, bronze medalist(s)	New Zealand	3rd place, bronze medalist(s)	New Zealand U19
4	Hong Kong	4	Hong Kong
		5	South Korea
