= Korea Lacrosse Association =

Sporting governing body in South Korea

- Sport: Lacrosse
- Jurisdiction: National
- Abbreviation: KLA
- Founded: 1997
- Affiliation: World Lacrosse
- Regional affiliation: APLU
- Affiliation date: 2004
- Headquarters: Seoul, South Korea
- President: Lim Jong-hoon

Official website
- www.lacrosse.or.kr
- (South Korea)

The Korea Lacrosse Association (KLA; Korean: 한국라크로스협회) is the governing body for the sport of lacrosse in South Korea.

== History ==
The Korea Lacrosse Association (KLA) was established in 1997. It was founded by Park Won-jae who brought the sport to South Korea, after living in the United States.

Starting with a group of just three people, Park recruited people to be able to build a lacrosse team. He established contacts from Japan and Hong Kong until the KLA is able to hold official tournaments in South Korea.

The KLA took part at its first ever World Lacrosse Championship sending a men's national team in the 2002 edition.

The KLA is also among the founding members of the Asia Pacific Lacrosse Union which was established in 2004. The South Korean national team also took part at the first Asia-Pacific Lacrosse Championship in 2004.

The International Federation of Women's Lacrosse Associations admitted the KLA as a full member in 2007.

== Tournaments ==
The KLA organizes multiple tournaments in South Korea at the high school, club and college levels as well as multiple domestic leagues. It has also organizes a domestic lacrosse sixes league ahead of World Lacrosse' release of standards for the discipline.

The KLA has also organized three editions of the Asia-Pacific Lacrosse Championship; the 2009 edition in Suwon, the 2017 edition in Seogwipo, and the 2019 edition in Gyeongju.

== Presidents ==
President	Term
Son Du-mok	1993–2002
Cho Dong-hyuk	2002–2020
Park Won-jae	2020–2024
Lim Jong-hoon	2024–incumbent
