= 2023 World Lacrosse Men's World Championship Asia Pacific Qualifier =

Tournament details
- Host country: South Korea
- Dates: 4–8 October 2022
- Teams: 6

The 2023 World Lacrosse Men's World Championship Asia Pacific Qualifier is an international women's lacrosse competition held in Seogwipo, South Korea from 4 to 8 October 2022. It served as the qualifier for the 2023 World Lacrosse Men's Championship with the top four teams securing a place in the championship.

It was originally scheduled to be hosted by New Zealand but was moved to South Korea due to COVID-19 pandemic-related travel restrictions.

South Korea, Hong Kong, New Zealand, and the Philippines qualified for the World Championship.

== Results ==
Pos	Team	Pld	W	L	GF	GA	GD	Qualification
1	South Korea (H)	5	4	1	42	32	+10	2023 World Championship
2	Hong Kong	5	4	1	43	28	+15	2023 World Championship
3	New Zealand	5	3	2	36	27	+9	2023 World Championship
4	Philippines	5	2	3	23	28	−5	2023 World Championship
5	China	5	2	3	31	33	−2	
6	Chinese Taipei	5	0	5	19	46	−27	

Source: APLU
(H) Hosts

4 October 2022; 9:30	China	10–4	Chinese Taipei

4 October 2022; 12:30	Philippines	4–9	Hong Kong

4 October 2022; 15:30	New Zealand	6–7	South Korea

5 October 2022; 9:30	Philippines	3–4	China

5 October 2022; 12:30	New Zealand	10–1	Chinese Taipei

5 October 2022; 15:30	South Korea	11–5	Hong Kong

6 October 2022; 9:30	Chinese Taipei	3–6	Philippines

6 October 2022; 12:30	South Korea	7–8	China

6 October 2022; 15:30	Hong Kong	8–7	New Zealand

7 October 2022; 9:30	Chinese Taipei	8–9	South Korea

7 October 2022; 12:30	Philippines	4–5	New Zealand

7 October 2022; 15:30	Hong Kong	10–3	China

8 October 2022; 9:30	Philippines	5–8	South Korea

8 October 2022; 12:30	Hong Kong	11–3	Chinese Taipei

8 October 2022; 15:30	New Zealand	8–7	China
