= 2007 Asia-Pacific Lacrosse Championship =

International lacrosse competition

Tournament details
- Host country: New Zealand

Final positions
- Champions: Australia U21
- Runners-up: Japan U21
- Third place: New Zealand
- Fourth place: Hong Kong–Korea (Note: Joint national teams of Hong Kong and South Korea)

The 2007 Asia-Pacific Lacrosse Championship was an international men's lacrosse tournament under the Asia Pacific Lacrosse Union (APLU). This edition of the Asia-Pacific Lacrosse Championship was held in Auckland, New Zealand.

== Venues ==
Auckland	2007 Asia-Pacific Lacrosse Championship (New Zealand)
North Harbour Stadium	2007 Asia-Pacific Lacrosse Championship (New Zealand)
Capacity: 14,000	2007 Asia-Pacific Lacrosse Championship (New Zealand)

== Results ==
=== Double round robin ===
Pos	Team	Pld	W	L	GF	GA	GD	Qualification
1	Australia U21	6	5	1	117	25	+92	Final
2	Japan U21	6	5	1	103	33	+70	Final
3	New Zealand	6	2	4	48	86	−38	Third place game
4	Hong Kong–Korea	6	0	6	16	140	−124	Third place game

Source: JLA

April 1, 2007; 12:00	New Zealand	1–24	Australia U21	North Harbour Stadium, Auckland

Game reference

April 1, 2007; 14:30	Japan U21	29–2	Hong Kong–Korea	North Harbour Stadium, Auckland

Game reference

April 2, 2007; 12:00	New Zealand	12–5	Hong Kong–Korea	North Harbour Stadium, Auckland

Game reference

April 2, 2007; 14:30	Japan U21	11–12 (3–0, 3–5, 3–4, 2–3)	Australia U21	North Harbour Stadium, Auckland

Game reference

April 3, 2007; 12:00	New Zealand	3–20	Japan U21	North Harbour Stadium, Auckland

Game reference

April 3, 2007; 14:30	Hong Kong–Korea	1–27	Australia U21	North Harbour Stadium, Auckland

Game reference

April 4, 2007; 12:00	New Zealand	4–19	Australia U21	North Harbour Stadium, Auckland

Game reference

April 4, 2007; 14:30	Japan U21	24–1	Hong Kong–Korea	North Harbour Stadium, Auckland

Game reference

April 5, 2007; 12:00	New Zealand	22–5	Hong Kong–Korea	North Harbour Stadium, Auckland

Game reference

April 5, 2007; 14:30	Australia U21	9–6	Japan U21	North Harbour Stadium, Auckland

Game reference

April 6, 2007; 12:00	New Zealand	6–13 (1–3, 2–4, 2–2, 1–4)	Japan U21	North Harbour Stadium, Auckland

Game reference

April 6, 2007; 14:30	Hong Kong–Korea	2–26	Australia U21	North Harbour Stadium, Auckland

Game reference

=== Final round ===
==== 3rd place game ====
April 7, 2007; 12:00	Australia U21	17–7	Hong Kong–Korea	North Harbour Stadium, Auckland

Game reference

==== Final ====
April 7, 2007; 14:30	Australia U21	15–6 (5–2, 3–1, 4–1, 3–2)	Japan U21	North Harbour Stadium, Auckland

Game reference

== Women's exhibition ==
A women's tournament was planned but did not materialize. Instead an intra-national team exhibition game was held between the senior and under-19 players of the New Zealand national team.

2007	New Zealand Seniors	14–8	New Zealand U19	Auckland

Game reference
