= Hyunjoon Park =

South Korean lacrosse player

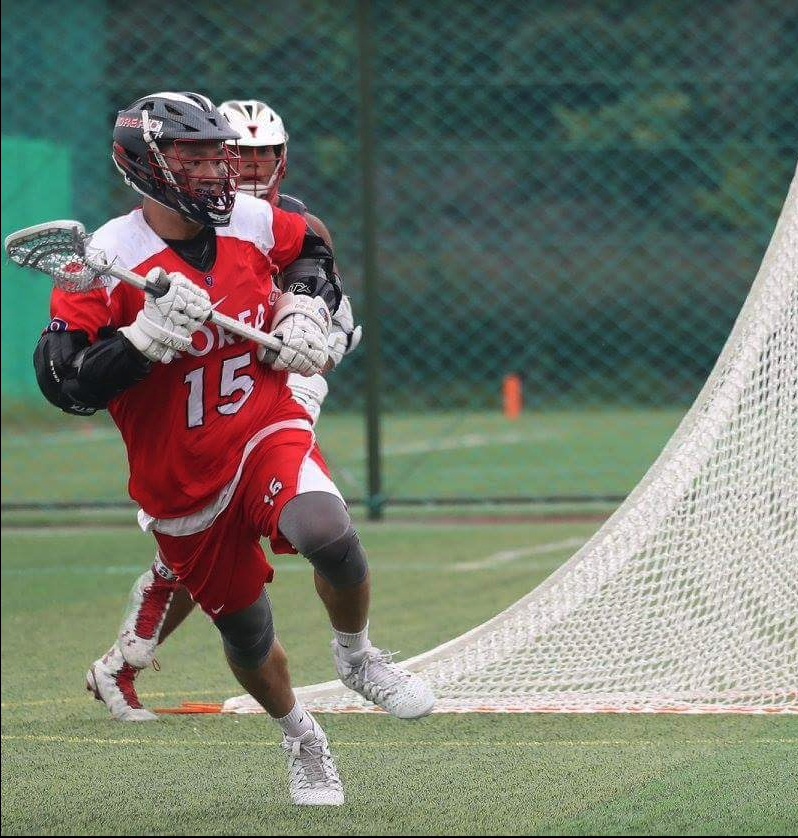
- Park at the 2019 Asia Pacific Lacrosse Championship

Personal information
- Nationality: South Korea
- Born: September 14, 1987 (age 38) Seoul, South Korea
- Height: 5 ft 11 in (180 cm)
- Weight: 190 lb (86 kg; 13 st 8 lb)

Sport
- Position: Midfielder
- Shoots: Right

Career highlights
- 2014 Korea National Summer Lacrosse League MVP; 2015 Asia Pacific Lacrosse Championship Player of the Match; 2015 Korea National Indoor Lacrosse League MVP; 2016 Under-19 World Lacrosse Championships World Lacrosse Spirit of Lacrosse Award; 2019 Asia Pacific Lacrosse Championship Bronze Medal

Park Hyunjoon (Korean: 박현준; born September 14, 1987, in Seoul, South Korea) is a South Korean lacrosse player who serves as a midfielder for the Korea National Lacrosse team. He has captained both South Korea's U-19 and Men's National Lacrosse Teams.

Park has also coached Korea's U-19 National Lacrosse Team and is serving as the delegate of South Korea to World Lacrosse, formerly known as the Federation of International Lacrosse.

== International career ==
Park began his international lacrosse career in 2008 at the U-19 World Championship as an Attackman and as the captain of the U-19 Korea National Lacrosse Team. In 2014, he captained the Men's Korea National Team at the 2014 World Lacrosse Championship in Denver, USA and in the following international competitions until the year 2017. In 2019, Team Korea earned the Bronze Medal at the APLU Asia Pacific Lacrosse Championship in Gyeongju, South Korea behind Japan and Australia.

=== International competitions ===
- 2008 Men's U-19 World Lacrosse Championship Coquitlam, Canada
- 2009 Asia Pacific Lacrosse Championship Suwon, Korea
- 2014 World Lacrosse Championship Denver, USA
- 2015 Asia-Pacific Lacrosse Championship Bangkok, Thailand
- 2017 Asia-Pacific Lacrosse Championship Jeju, South Korea
- 2018 World Lacrosse Championship Netanya, Israel
- 2019 Asia Pacific Lacrosse Championship Gyeongju, South Korea

== Coaching career ==
In 2016, Park led the South Korea national under-19 national lacrosse team at the World Lacrosse U-19 World Lacrosse Championship in Coquitlam, Canada as an assistant coach and was awarded the 2016 World Lacrosse Spirit of Lacrosse Award.
