= 2005 Asia-Pacific Lacrosse Championship =

International lacrosse competition

Tournament details
- Host country: Japan
- Venues: 2 (in 1 host city)
- Dates: June 14–19
- Teams: 4

Final positions
- Champions: Australia U21
- Runners-up: Japan U21
- Third place: South Korea
- Fourth place: Hong Kong

The 2005 Asia-Pacific Lacrosse Championship was an international men's lacrosse tournament under the Asia Pacific Lacrosse Union (APLU). This edition of the Asia-Pacific Lacrosse Championship was held in Osaka, Japan.

A women's tournament was also planned with invitations sent to APLU members to send teams. However no women's tournament was held.

== Venues ==
Osaka		2005 Asia-Pacific Lacrosse Championship (Osaka Prefecture)
Maishima Sports Island	Nagai Stadium	2005 Asia-Pacific Lacrosse Championship (Osaka Prefecture)
Capacity: N/A	Capacity: 47,853	2005 Asia-Pacific Lacrosse Championship (Osaka Prefecture)

== Results ==
=== Round robin ===
Pos	Team	Pld	W	L	GF	GA	GD	Qualification	USA	CAL	AUS	JPN	KOR	HKG
1	(United States) California	5	4	1	67	27	+40	Finals		10–6	11–5	6–7	23–1	23–0
2	(United States) USA West	5	4	1	73	19	+54	Finals	6–10		11–5	9–8	23–2	18–2
3	Australia U21	5	3	2	76	35	+41	Playoffs	5–11	5–11		13–9	20–4	33–0
4	Japan U21	5	3	2	85	30	+55	Playoffs	7–6	8–9	9–13		30–2	31–0
5	South Korea	5	1	4	18	101	−83	Playoffs	1–23	2–23	4–20	2–30		9–5
6	Hong Kong	5	0	5	7	114	−107	Playoffs	0–23	2–18	0–33	0–31	5–9	

Source: JLA

June 14, 2005; 9:30	Australia U21	33–1	Hong Kong	Maishima Sports Island, Osaka

Game reference

June 14, 2005; 10:00	Japan U21	8–9	(United States) California	Maishima Sports Island, Osaka

Game reference

June 14, 2005; 13:30	South Korea	4–20	Australia U21	Maishima Sports Island, Osaka

Game reference

June 14, 2005; 15:00	Hong Kong	0–23	(United States) USA West	Maishima Sports Island, Osaka

Game reference

June 14, 2005; 17:00	California (United States)	23–2	South Korea	Maishima Sports Island, Osaka

Game reference

June 15, 2005; 9:30	South Korea	2–30	Japan U21	Maishima Sports Island, Osaka

Game reference

June 15, 2005; 11:30	Australia U21	5–11	(United States) California	Maishima Sports Island, Osaka

Game reference

June 15, 2005; 13:00	Japan U21	7–6	(United States) USA West	Maishima Sports Island, Osaka

Game reference

June 15, 2005; 14:30	South Korea	9–5	Hong Kong	Maishima Sports Island, Osaka

Game reference

June 15, 2005; 17:00	Australia U21	5–11	(United States) USA West	Maishima Sports Island, Osaka

Game reference

June 16, 2005; 9:00	USA West (United States)	10–6	(United States) California	Maishima Sports Island, Osaka

Game reference

June 16, 2005; 11:30	Australia U21	13–9	Japan U21	Maishima Sports Island, Osaka

Game reference

June 16, 2005; 13:00	Hong Kong	2–18	(United States) California	Maishima Sports Island, Osaka

Game reference

June 16, 2005; 14:30	South Korea	1–23	(United States) USA West	Maishima Sports Island, Osaka

Game reference

June 16, 2005; 17:00	Japan U21	31–0	Hong Kong	Maishima Sports Island, Osaka

Game reference

=== Consolation round ===
3rd–6th games
R3	Australia U21	33
R6	Hong Kong	0
R4	Japan U21	30
R5	South Korea	1

Bronze medal game
R3	Australia U21	15
R4	Japan U21	9
Fifth place game
R5	South Korea	9
R6	Hong Kong	3

==== Places 3–6 ====
June 18, 2005; 10:00	Japan U21	30–1 (10–1, 8–0, 7–0, 5–0)	South Korea	Maishima Sports Island, Osaka

Game reference

June 18, 2005; 11:30	Australia U21	33–0 (5–0, 8–0, 9–0, 11–0)	Hong Kong	Maishima Sports Island, Osaka

Game reference

==== 5th place game ====
June 18, 2005; 16:00	South Korea	9–3 (3–0, 3–1,2–1, 1–1)	Hong Kong	Maishima Sports Island, Osaka

Game reference

==== 3rd place game ====
June 19, 2005; 10:30	Australia U21	15–9 (2–4, 4–2,2–0, 7–3)	Japan U21	Nagai Stadium, Osaka

Game reference

=== Final ===
June 19, 2005; 13:30	USA West (United States)	19–11 (5–1, 7–2, 2–5, 5–3)	(United States) California	Nagai Stadium, Osaka

Game reference

== Final standings ==
Overall		APLU-only	
Rank	Team	Rank	Team
1st place, gold medalist(s)	(United States) USA West	1st place, gold medalist(s)	Australia U21
2nd place, silver medalist(s)	(United States) California	2nd place, silver medalist(s)	Japan U21
3rd place, bronze medalist(s)	Australia U21	3rd place, bronze medalist(s)	South Korea
4	Japan U21	4	Hong Kong
5	South Korea		
6	Hong Kong		

Source: APLU
