= 2015 Asia-Pacific Lacrosse Championship =

International lacrosse competition

Tournament details
- Host country: Thailand
- Venues: 2 (in 1 host city)
- Dates: July 4–11

The 2015 Asia-Pacific Lacrosse Championships is an international lacrosse competition held in Nonthaburi (Note: Bangkok for marketing purposes), Thailand. Both a men's and women's tournament was held in this iteration of the Asia-Pacific Lacrosse Championship.

== Participating teams ==
Men's	Women's
Australia U23; China United (Note: Competed under the name "China United"); Japan U22; Hong Kong; Malaysia; Singapore; South Korea; Thailand (hosts)	Australia U23; Chinese United; Japan U22; Hong Kong; South Korea; Thailand (hosts)

== Venues ==
Nonthaburi	2015 Asia-Pacific Lacrosse Championship (Bangkok)
SCG Stadium	2015 Asia-Pacific Lacrosse Championship (Bangkok)
Capacity: 15,000	2015 Asia-Pacific Lacrosse Championship (Bangkok)
Muangthong United Training Center Fields 1–3	2015 Asia-Pacific Lacrosse Championship (Bangkok)
Capacity: N/A	2015 Asia-Pacific Lacrosse Championship (Bangkok)

== Men's ==
2015 Asia-Pacific Men's Lacrosse Championship
Tournament details
- Teams: 8

Final positions
- Champions: Japan U22
- Runners-up: Thailand
- Third place: Australia U23
- Fourth place: Hong Kong

=== Round robin ===
Pos	Team	Pld	W	L	GF	GA	GD	Qualification
1	Japan U22	6	6	0	145	19	+126	Final
2	Thailand (H)	6	5	1	70	41	+29	Final
3	Australia U23	6	4	2	92	22	+70	Third place game
4	Hong Kong	6	3	3	30	62	−32	Third place game
5	South Korea	6	3	3	54	42	+12	
6	Singapore	6	2	4	37	76	−39	
7	China United	6	1	5	16	112	−96	
8	Malaysia	6	0	6	10	80	−70	

Source: APLU
(H) Hosts

July 4, 2015	Thailand	6–21	Japan U22	Nonthaburi

Game reference

July 4, 2015	Australia U23	16–1	Hong Kong	Nonthaburi

Game reference

July 4, 2015	Singapore	12–2	China United	Nonthaburi

Game reference

July 4, 2015	South Korea	16–2	Malaysia	Nonthaburi

Game reference

July 5, 2015	Thailand	15–7	Hong Kong	Nonthaburi

Game reference

July 5, 2015	Australia U23	25–0	China United	Nonthaburi

Game reference

July 5, 2015	Japan U22	37–1	Malaysia	Nonthaburi

Game reference

July 5, 2015	South Korea	10–6	Singapore	Nonthaburi

Game reference

July 6, 2015	Malaysia	5–10	Singapore	Nonthaburi

Game reference

July 6, 2015	Thailand	19–3	China United	Nonthaburi

Game reference

July 6, 2015	South Korea	5–6	Hong Kong	Nonthaburi

Game reference

July 6, 2015	Japan U22	13–7	Australia U23	Nonthaburi

Game reference

July 7, 2015	China United	13–6	Malaysia	Nonthaburi

Game reference

July 7, 2015	Japan U22	18–5	South Korea	Nonthaburi

Game reference

July 7, 2015	Thailand	11–9	Australia U23	Nonthaburi

Game reference

July 7, 2015	Hong Kong	15–10	Singapore	Nonthaburi

Game reference

July 8, 2015	Malaysia	0–1 (Default)	Hong Kong	Nonthaburi

Game reference

July 8, 2015	Australia U23	18–1	Singapore	Nonthaburi

Game reference

July 8, 2015	Japan U22	28–2	China United	Nonthaburi

Game reference

July 8, 2015	Thailand	11–5	South Korea	Nonthaburi

Game reference

July 9, 2015	Thailand	18–5	Singapore	Nonthaburi

Game reference

July 9, 2015	China United	6–13	South Korea	Nonthaburi

Game reference

July 9, 2015	Japan U22	23–0	Hong Kong	Nonthaburi

Game reference

July 9, 2015	Australia U23	15–2	Malaysia	Nonthaburi

Game reference

July 10, 2015	Japan U22	23–3	Singapore	Nonthaburi

Game reference

July 10, 2015	Thailand	1–0 (Default)	Malaysia	Nonthaburi

Game reference

July 10, 2015	China United	3–15	Hong Kong	Nonthaburi

Game reference

July 10, 2015	Australia U23	11–5	South Korea	Nonthaburi

Game reference

=== Final round ===
==== 3rd place game ====
July 11, 2015	Australia U23	16–10	Hong Kong	Nonthaburi

Game reference

==== Final ====
July 11, 2015	Japan U22	11–9	Thailand	Nonthaburi

Game reference

== Women's ==
2015 Asia-Pacific Women's Lacrosse Championship
Tournament details
- Teams: 6

Final positions
- Champions: Japan U22
- Runners-up: Australia U23
- Third place: South Korea
- Fourth place: Hong Kong

=== Round robin ===
Pos	Team	Pld	W	L	GF	GA	GD	Qualification
1	Japan U22	5	5	0	78	8	+70	Final
2	Australia U23	5	4	1	83	24	+59	Final
3	South Korea	5	3	2	59	31	+28	Third place game
4	Hong Kong	5	2	3	41	57	−16	Third place game
5	China United	5	1	4	23	96	−73	
6	Thailand (H)	5	0	5	26	94	−68	

Source: APLU
(H) Hosts

July 4, 2015	Japan U22	19–0	Hong Kong	Nonthaburi

Game reference

July 4, 2015	Australia U23	9–5	South Korea	Nonthaburi

Game reference

July 4, 2015	Thailand	14–16	China United	Nonthaburi

Game reference

July 5, 2015	Thailand	4–15	Hong Kong	Nonthaburi

Game reference

July 5, 2015	Australia U23	5–12	Japan U22	Nonthaburi

Game reference

July 5, 2015	China United	1–17	South Korea	Nonthaburi

Game reference

July 6, 2015	Japan U22	15–1	South Korea	Nonthaburi

Game reference

July 6, 2015	China United	4–21	Hong Kong	Nonthaburi

Game reference

July 6, 2015	Thailand	4–22	Australia U23	Nonthaburi

Game reference

July 8, 2015	Hong Kong	3–11	South Korea	Nonthaburi

Game reference

July 8, 2015	Japan U22	16–1	Thailand	Nonthaburi

Game reference

July 8, 2015	Australia U23	28–1	China United	Nonthaburi

Game reference

July 9, 2015	Japan U22	16–1	China United	Nonthaburi

Game reference

July 9, 2015	Australia U23	19–2	Hong Kong	Nonthaburi

Game reference

July 9, 2015	Thailand	3–25	South Korea	Nonthaburi

Game reference

=== Final round ===
==== 3rd place game ====
July 11, 2015	South Korea	19–2	Hong Kong	Nonthaburi

Game reference

==== Final ====
July 11, 2015	Japan U22	22–5	Australia U23	Nonthaburi

Game reference
