= 2009 Asia-Pacific Lacrosse Championship =

International lacrosse competition

Tournament details
- Host country: South Korea
- Dates: June 8–13 (women); June 16–21 (men)
- Teams: M: 6 / W: 6

The 2009 Asia-Pacific Lacrosse Championship was an international lacrosse tournament under the Asia Pacific Lacrosse Union (APLU). It was held in Suwon, South Korea.

The women's tournament, the first ever in the history of the Asia-Pacific Lacrosse Championship, was held from June 8 to 13, 2009. The men's tournament was later held from June 16 to 21, 2009.

Japan under-22 women's team and guest team United States West were the champions of the women's and men's tournaments respectively. Japan under-22 men's team were the best performing APLU team.

== Participating teams ==
Men's	Women's
Australia U22; Hong Kong; Japan U22; South Korea (hosts); USA West; ASPAC United (Note: Selection team composed of players from Japan, South Korea and Hong Kong)	(Japan) Team Ehime (Note: Selection team of Ehime University and Matsuyama University); Hong Kong; Japan U22; South Korea (hosts); South Korea Youth

Australia and New Zealand withdrew from the women's tournament due to financial issues.

== Venue ==
Suwon	2009 Asia-Pacific Lacrosse Championship (South Korea)
Suwon World Cup Stadium, Auxiliary Stadium	2009 Asia-Pacific Lacrosse Championship (South Korea)
Capacity: N/A	2009 Asia-Pacific Lacrosse Championship (South Korea)

== Men's ==
The men's tournament was conducted despite the Australian team being subject to quarantine measures related to the 2009 swine flu pandemic.

Third place game

June 21, 2009	Australia U22	14–5	South Korea	Suwon

Game reference

Final

June 21, 2009	Japan U22	13–15	(United States) USA West	Suwon

Game reference

== Women's ==
Ten matches were held for the preliminary round. Games for the third place and first place were held.

Third place game

June 13, 2009	Hong Kong	13–3	South Korea	Suwon

Game reference

Final

June 13, 2009	Japan U22	43–0	(Japan) Team Ehime	Suwon

Game reference

== Final standings ==
=== Overall ===
Men's		Women's	
Rank	Team	Rank	Team
1st place, gold medalist(s)	USA West	1st place, gold medalist(s)	Japan U22
2nd place, silver medalist(s)	Japan U22	2nd place, silver medalist(s)	(Japan) Team Ehime
3rd place, bronze medalist(s)	Australia U22	3rd place, bronze medalist(s)	Hong Kong
4	South Korea	4	South Korea
5	ASPAC United	5	South Korea Youth
6	Hong Kong		

=== APLU members only ===
Men's		Women's	
Rank	Team	Rank	Team
1st place, gold medalist(s)	Japan U22	1st place, gold medalist(s)	Japan U22
2nd place, silver medalist(s)	Australia U22	2nd place, silver medalist(s)	Hong Kong
3rd place, bronze medalist(s)	South Korea	3rd place, bronze medalist(s)	South Korea
4	Hong Kong		
