= Japan Lacrosse Association =

Sports governing body in Japan

- Sport: Lacrosse
- Jurisdiction: National
- Abbreviation: JLA
- Founded: 1987
- Affiliation: World Lacrosse
- Affiliation date: 1990
- Regional affiliation: APLU
- Affiliation date: 2004
- Headquarters: Chūō, Tokyo
- President: Yusuke Sasaki

Official website
- www.lacrosse.gr.jp
- (Japan)

The Japan Lacrosse Association (JLA, Japanese: 日本ラクロス協会, romanized: Nihon Rakurosu Kyōkai) is the governing body for the sports of lacrosse in Japan.

== History ==
=== Establishment ===
The Japan Lacrosse Association was established in June 1987. Prior to that Johns Hopkins University alumni Norio Endo established contact with Ross Jones the vice president and secretary of his alma mater. Endo shared that Keio University students wanted to take up lacrosse and Johns Hopkins donated equipment to Keio. Endo became the inaugural president of the JLA.

In July 1987, Don Zimmerman and four Johns Hopkins players conducted a clinic in Japan. The sport was also promoted to women with Hopkins coach Sally Beth Anderson also coming to Japan.

In 1989, the International Lacrosse Friendship Games featuring the Japanese and Australian national teams as well as Johns Hopkins and St. Paul's took part. This has been a recurring friendly tournament by the JLA. In 1990, the JLA joined the Federation of International Lacrosse (FIL; later renamed as World Lacrosse).

=== 2000s and onward ===
Japan is a founding member of the Asia Pacific Lacrosse Union (APLU) which was established in 2004.

By the end of the 2010s, Japan became one of the top teams in the world, with its men's and women's national teams finishing within the top ten in the World Championships. On 1 June 2018, the JLA became a general incorporated association.

Japan won its first world-level title when the sixes men's team won bronze at the 2022 World Games. In 1 August 2022, the JLA was recognized as a public interest incorporated association.
