= 2026 Asia-Pacific Men's Lacrosse Championship =

International lacrosse competition

Tournament details
- Host country: New Zealand
- Venue: 1 (in 1 host city)
- Dates: 6–11 January
- Teams: 7

Final positions
- Champions: Australia (4th title)
- Runners-up: Philippines
- Third place: Japan
- Fourth place: New Zealand

The 2026 Asia-Pacific Men's Lacrosse Championship is an international men's lacrosse competition held in Upper Hutt, New Zealand from 6 to 11 January 2026. The iteration of the Asia-Pacific Lacrosse Championship served as the qualifier for the 2027 World Lacrosse Men's Championship with the top three teams outside host Japan securing a place in the championship.

Australia won its fourth overall title.

== Venue ==
Upper Hutt
New Zealand Campus of Innovation and Sport (NZCIS) Competition Field
Capacity: N/A
2026 Asia-Pacific Men's Lacrosse Championship (New Zealand)

== Preliminary round ==
=== Pool A ===
Pos	Team	Pld	W	L	GF	GA	GD	Qualification
1	Australia	2	2	0	56	7	+49	Advance to Semifinals and 2027 World Championship
2	New Zealand (H)	2	1	1	15	36	−21	Advance to Play-in
3	South Korea	2	0	2	12	40	−28	Advance to Play-in
4	Chinese Taipei	0	0	0	0	0	0	Withdrew

Source: WL
(H) Hosts

6 January 2026; 10:00	New Zealand	2–29	Australia	NZCIS Competition Field, Upper Hutt

Game reference

7 January 2026; 13:00	New Zealand	13–7	South Korea	NZCIS Competition Field, Upper Hutt

Game reference

8 January 2026; 16:00	Australia	27–5	South Korea	NZCIS Competition Field, Upper Hutt

Game reference

=== Pool B ===
Pos	Team	Pld	W	L	GF	GA	GD	Qualification
1	Philippines	3	3	0	39	14	+25	Advance to Semifinals and 2027 World Championship
2	Japan	3	2	1	47	16	+31	Advance to Play-in
3	Hong Kong	3	1	2	26	31	−5	Advance to Play-in
4	China	3	0	3	4	55	−51	Advance to Sixth place game

Source: WL

6 January 2025; 13:00	Japan	20–5	Hong Kong	NZCIS Competition Field, Upper Hutt

Game reference

6 January 2025; 16:00	Philippines	20–1	China	NZCIS Competition Field, Upper Hutt

Game reference

7 January 2025; 10:00	Japan	18–1	China	NZCIS Competition Field, Upper Hutt

Game reference

7 January 2025; 16:00	Hong Kong	4–9	Philippines	NZCIS Competition Field, Upper Hutt

Game reference

8 January 2025; 10:00	Hong Kong	17–2	China	NZCIS Competition Field, Upper Hutt

Game reference

8 January 2025; 13:00	Japan	9–10 (2OT)	Philippines	NZCIS Competition Field, Upper Hutt

Game reference

== Final round ==
=== Brackets ===
Play-ins
A2	New Zealand	10
B3	Hong Kong	6
B2	Japan	18
A3	South Korea	7

Semifinals
B1	Philippines	12
A2	New Zealand	7
A1	Australia	15
B2	Japan	8

Final
B1	Philippines	3
A1	Australia	13
Third place
A2	New Zealand	5
B2	Japan	9

Fifth place			Sixth place
			P1	Hong Kong	19
P1	Hong Kong	7	B4	China	6
P2	South Korea	13

=== Play-ins ===
9 January 2026; 10:00	New Zealand	10–6	Hong Kong	NZCIS Competition Field, Upper Hutt

Game reference

9 January 2026; 13:00	Japan	18–7	South Korea	NZCIS Competition Field, Upper Hutt

Game reference

=== Semifinals ===
10 January 2026; 9:00	Philippines	12–7	New Zealand	NZCIS Competition Field, Upper Hutt

Game reference

10 January 2026; 12:00	Australia	15–8	Japan	NZCIS Competition Field, Upper Hutt

Game reference

=== 5th–7th place ===
==== 5th place game ====
10 January 2026; 15:00	Hong Kong	7–13	South Korea	NZCIS Competition Field, Upper Hutt

Game reference

==== 6th place game ====
11 January 2026; 9:00	Hong Kong	19–6	China	NZCIS Competition Field, Upper Hutt

Game reference

=== 3rd place game ===
11 January 2026; 12:00	New Zealand	5–9	Japan	NZCIS Competition Field, Upper Hutt

Game reference

=== Final ===
11 January 2026; 15:00	Philippines	3–13	Australia	NZCIS Competition Field, Upper Hutt

Game reference

== Final standings ==
Qualify to the 2027 World Lacrosse Men's Championship as the host country
Qualify to the 2027 World Lacrosse Men's Championship via standings

Rank	Team
1st place, gold medalist(s)	Australia
2nd place, silver medalist(s)	Philippines
3rd place, bronze medalist(s)	Japan
4	New Zealand
5	South Korea
6	Hong Kong
7	China

== See also ==
- 2025 Asia-Pacific Women's Lacrosse Championship
