= Hong Kong women's national lacrosse team =

National sports team

Hong Kong
- WL membership: 2002
- Association: Hong Kong Lacrosse Association
- Confederation: APLU (Asia Pacific)

Women's World Championship
- Appearances: 3 (first in 2013)
- Best result: Sixteenth (2022)

Asia Pacific Championship
- Appearances: 6 (first in 2009)
- Best result: Runners-up (2009)

The Hong Kong women's national lacrosse team, also known as the Hong Kong women's representative lacrosse team, represents the Chinese territory of Hong Kong in international lacrosse competitions. It is organized by the Hong Kong Lacrosse Association.

== History ==
Women at the University of Hong Kong (HKU) have played lacrosse from the 1960s until the 1970s. After this period the number of female players declined leading to HKU stopping its women's program. Meanwhile graduates from the HKU led by Louis Hou went on to form the Hong Kong Lacrosse Association (HKLA) in 1993.

The first women's representative for Hong Kong under the auspices of the Hong Kong Lacrosse Association competed at the 2006 Prague Cup.

They competed in their first Women's Lacrosse World Cup (later renamed as the World Championship) in the 2013 edition in Oshawa, Canada under Japanese coach Noriko Uchiyama.

For the 2026 World Lacrosse Women's Championship, Hong Kong competed in the Division II tournament in Wrocław, Poland. They finished fifth within the division.

== Competitive record ==
=== World Lacrosse Championship ===
Year	Host	GP	W	L	GF	GA	Finish
2013	Canada	8	2	6	–	–	18th
2017	England	8	4	4	76	62	18th
2022	United States	8	2	6	74	68	16th
2026	Poland	7	4	3	63	50	21st (5th in Division II)
Total	−	31	12	19	–	–	No Medal

=== Asia-Pacific Lacrosse Championship ===
Year	Host	GP	W	L	GF	GA	Finish
2009	South Korea	No information					2nd place, silver medalist(s)
2011	New Zealand	No information					4th
2013	China	Did not enter					—
2015	Thailand	6	2	4	43	76	4th
2017	South Korea	6	2	4	57	79	5th
2019	South Korea	6	2	4	50	73	4th
2025	Australia	5	2	3	31	55	6th
Total	−	–	–	–	–	–	1 silver
