= Chinese Taipei men's national lacrosse team =

Chinese Taipei
- WL membership: 2015
- Association: Chinese Taipei Lacrosse Association
- Confederation: APLU (Asia–Pacific)

World Championship
- Appearances: 1 (first in 2018)
- Best result: 41st (2018)

Asia Pacific Championship
- Appearances: 2 (first in 2017)
- Best result: 5th place (2017, 2019)

The Chinese Taipei men's national lacrosse team is the national team that represents the Taiwan in international lacrosse competitions under the name "Chinese Taipei".

== History ==
The Taiwan or Chinese Taipei first became a member of World Lacrosse in 2015. The Taiwan Lacrosse Association (TWLA) became a member of the world lacrosse body then known as the Federation of International Lacrosse. TWLA later became the Chinese Taipei Lacrosse Association.

They made their World Lacrosse Men's Championship debut in the 2018 edition in Israel.

== Competitive record ==
=== World Lacrosse Championship ===
Year	Host	GP	W	L	GF	GA	Finish
2018	Israel	7	3	4	46	67	41st
2023	United States	Did not enter					
Total	−	7	3	4	46	67	No Medal

=== Asia-Pacific Lacrosse Championship ===
Year	Host	GP	W	L	GF	GA	Finish
2015	Thailand	Did not enter					
2017	South Korea	6	1	5	37	91	5th
2019	South Korea	5	1	4	19	40	5th
2023	South Korea	5	0	5	19	46	6th
2026	New Zealand	Withdrew					
Total	−	16	2	14	73	177	No medal
