= Hong Kong men's national lacrosse team =

Hong Kong
- WL membership: 2002
- Association: Hong Kong Lacrosse Association
- Confederation: APLU (Asia Pacific)

World Championship
- Appearances: 4 (first in 2002)

Asia Pacific Championship
- Appearances: 9 (first in 2005)
- Best result: Third place (2017)

The Hong Kong men's national lacrosse team, also known as the Hong Kong men's representative lacrosse team, represents the Chinese territory of Hong Kong in international lacrosse competitions. It is organized by the Hong Kong Lacrosse Association.

== History ==
Lacrosse was introduced in the then-British colony of Hong Kong in 1950 by English academic Prof. Large. Large introduced the sport to the University of Hong Kong but students only played with lacrosse sticks until 1994 when the Japanese helped the Hong Kongers play in full gear. This led to Hong Kong's admission as a member of the Federation of International Lacrosse in 2002 and debuted at the World Lacrosse Championship in the same year.

At the 2017 Asia Pacific Championship in Jeju, South Korea, Hong Kong finished third behind champions Japan and runner-ups Australia. In the 2018 World Lacrosse Championship, the Hong Kong national team targets to finish among the top 20 participating nations.

The team qualified for the 2023 World Lacrosse Championship.

== Competitive record ==
=== Asia Pacific Lacrosse Championship ===
Year	Host	GP	W	L	GF	GA	Finish
2004	Australia	Did not enter					
2005	Japan	7	0	7	10	157	4th
2007	New Zealand	7	0	7	23	157	4th (Note: Combined team with South Korea)
2009	South Korea	No information					4th
2011	New Zealand	6	0	6	24	114	4th
2013	China	7	0	8	22	102	6th
2015	Thailand	7	3	4	40	78	4th
2017	South Korea	6	4	2	66	34	3rd place, bronze medalist(s)
2019	South Korea	7	3	4	34	56	4th
2026	New Zealand	6	2	4	58	60	6th
Total	9/10	–	–	–	–	–	No medal
