= World Lacrosse Men's Championship =

International lacrosse tournament

- Current season, competition or edition: 2027 World Lacrosse Men's Championship
- Sport: Field lacrosse
- Founded: 1967; 59 years ago
- Organising body: World Lacrosse
- Region: International
- Most recent champions: United States (11th title) (2023)
- Most titles: United States (11 titles)
- Related competitions: Women's Lacrosse World Cup World Indoor Lacrosse Championship World Lacrosse Men's U20 Championship
- Website: Official website

The World Lacrosse Men's Championship is the international men's field lacrosse championship organized by World Lacrosse that occurs every four years.

The WLC began before any international lacrosse organization had been formed. It started as a four-team invitational tournament which coincided with Canada's centennial lacrosse celebration in 1967. Canada, the United States, Australia, and England participated. Seven years later, Australia celebrated its lacrosse centenary and another four-team invitational tournament was held between the same countries. After that tournament in 1974, the first international governing body for men's lacrosse was formed, the International Lacrosse Federation (ILF). The ILF merged with the women's governing body in 2008 to form the Federation of International Lacrosse, which changed its name to World Lacrosse in 2019.

The United States has won the championship most titles in eleven times. With 46 nations competing, the 2018 WLC in Israel was the largest tournament and was the first championship held outside of Australia, Canada, England or the United States.

The oldest world Lacrosse championship match was recorded on April 22, 1870, in Montreal. The Montreal Lacrosse club accepted a challenge vs the Caughnawaga Lacrosse team.

== Editions ==
=== 2006 Championship ===
Canada defeated the United States 15–10 in the gold medal game of the 2006 World Championship in London, Ontario. Geoff Snider of Team Canada was named tournament MVP.

=== 2010 Championship ===
The 2010 WLC was held in Manchester, England from July 15 to 24. For the first time, a World Lacrosse Festival was sanctioned to run alongside the world championships.

With more nations entering, the Round Robin stage of the tournament featured 30 nations and was split into 7 divisions, considerably larger than ever before. The Iroquois Nationals were unable to participate because the host nation did not recognize the validity of passports issued by the Iroquois confederacy.

The United States defeated Canada 12–10 in the gold medal game to capture their ninth victory at the World Lacrosse Championship.

=== 2014 Championship ===
The 2014 WLC was held on July 10–19, 2014 in Commerce City, Colorado, at Dick's Sporting Goods Park, home of the Colorado Rapids soccer team. 38 nations participated in over 142 games. The countries with the top six rankings - Australia, Canada, England, Iroquois, Japan, and the United States - competed in the Blue Division.

Belgium, China, Colombia, Costa Rica, Israel, Russia, Thailand, Turkey, and Uganda all competed in the event for the first time.

Canada defeated the United States 8–5 in the gold medal game to capture their third World Lacrosse Championship

=== 2018 Championship ===
The 2018 WLC was held on July 11–21, 2018 in Netanya, Israel, at Netanya Stadium and Wingate Institute. 46 nations participated in tournament games. The countries with the top six rankings - Australia, Canada, England, Iroquois, Scotland, and the United States - competed in the Blue Division.

United States defeated Canada in the gold medal game, dramatically scoring the controversial game-winning goal at the last second.

=== 2023 Championship ===
Originally, the championship was scheduled to be held in 2022 in Coquitlam, British Columbia, however due to the COVID-19 pandemic, the games were delayed to 2023 and moved to Los Angeles, California, but ultimately were relocated to San Diego, California.

The 2023 WLC was held from June 21–July 1, 2023. Pool games and placement games were held at San Diego State University's SDSU Sports Deck and the University of San Diego's Torero Stadium, while playoff games were held at SDSU's Snapdragon Stadium. 30 nations participated in tournament games, marking both the first time qualifiers were used to determine tournament entry and the first time the number of competing teams decreased from the previous tournament.

The countries with the top five rankings - Australia, Canada, England, Haudenosaunee, and the United States - competed in Pool A.

After the tournament, the Philippines' standing was demoted to 30th (last place) due to the team's failure to comply with eligibility requirements, the team initially finished in 15th place.

== Championship hosts ==
Hosting responsibilities for the 12 championships from 1967 to 2014 were evenly divided between four countries, with the United States, Canada, Australia, and England each hosting three times.

The 2018 championship in Israel was the first time the tournament expanded beyond the traditional four hosts. For the 2018 edition, World Lacrosse had originally selected England in 2013, but English Lacrosse withdrew in 2017, citing “unacceptable financial risk”, and Israel was selected instead.

== Results ==
| Year | Host | Champions | Score | Runner-up | Number of teams |
|---|---|---|---|---|---|
| 1967 | (Canada); Toronto, Ontario | United States | League | Australia | 4 |
| 1974 | Melbourne, Australia | United States | League | Australia | 4 |
| 1978 | Stockport, England | Canada | 17–16 (OT) | United States | 4 |
| 1982 | (United States); Baltimore, Maryland | United States | 22–14 | Australia | 4 |
| 1986 | (Canada); Toronto, Ontario | United States | 18–9 | Canada | 4 |
| 1990 | Perth, Australia | United States | 19–15 | Canada | 5 |
| 1994 | Bury, England | United States | 21–7 | Australia | 6 |
| 1998 | (United States); Baltimore, Maryland | United States | 15–14 (OT) | Canada | 11 |
| 2002 | Perth, Australia | United States | 18–15 | Canada | 16 |
| 2006 | (Canada); London, Ontario | Canada | 15–10 | United States | 21 |
| 2010 | Manchester, England | United States | 12–10 | Canada | 29 |
| 2014 | (United States); Denver, Colorado | Canada | 8–5 | United States | 38 |
| 2018 | Netanya, Israel | United States | 9–8 | Canada | 46 |
| 2023 | (United States); San Diego, California | United States | 10–7 | Canada | 30 |
| 2027 | TBD, Japan | | | | |

== Performance by team ==
=== Medal table ===
| Rank | Nation | Gold | Silver | Bronze | Total |
|---|---|---|---|---|---|
| 1 | United States | 11 | 3 | 0 | 14 |
| 2 | Canada | 3 | 7 | 4 | 14 |
| 3 | Australia | 0 | 4 | 7 | 11 |
| 4 | Haudenosaunee | 0 | 0 | 3 | 3 |
| Totals (4 entries) | | 14 | 14 | 14 | 42 |

=== Performance by tournament ===
| Team | Appearances | Highest Finish | 1967 (Canada) (4) | 1974 (Australia) (4) | 1978 (England) (4) | 1982 (United States) (4) | 1986 (Canada) (4) | 1990 (Australia) (5) | 1994 (England) (6) | 1998 (United States) (11) | 2002 (Australia) (15) | 2006 (Canada) (21) | 2010 (England) (29) | 2014 (United States) (38) | 2018 (Israel) (46) | 2023 (United States) (30) | 2027 (Japan) TBD |
|---|---|---|---|---|---|---|---|---|---|---|---|---|---|---|---|---|---|
| Argentina | 3 | 28th | – | – | – | – | – | – | – | – | – | – | 28th | 36th | 39th | – | |
| Australia | 14 | 2nd | 2nd | 2nd | 3rd | 2nd | 3rd | 3rd | 2nd | 3rd | 3rd | 3rd | 3rd | 4th | 4th | 4th | |
| Austria | 4 | 21st | – | – | – | – | – | – | – | – | – | – | 21st | 28th | 24th | 27th | |
| Belgium | 2 | 27th | – | – | – | – | – | – | – | – | – | – | – | 27th | 30th | • | |
| Bermuda | 4 | 18th | – | – | – | – | – | – | – | – | – | 21st | 18th | 24th | 37th | – | |
| Bulgaria | 0 | •• | – | – | – | – | – | – | – | – | – | – | – | – | •• | – | |
| Canada | 14 | 1st | 3rd | 3rd | 1st | 3rd | 2nd | 2nd | 3rd | 2nd | 2nd | 1st | 2nd | 1st | 2nd | 2nd | |
| China | 2 | 33rd | – | – | – | – | – | – | – | – | – | – | – | 33rd | 42nd | • | |
| Colombia | 2 | 37th | – | – | – | – | – | – | – | – | – | – | – | 37th | 45th | • | |
| Costa Rica | 1 | 38th | – | – | – | – | – | – | – | – | – | – | – | 38th | – | – | |
| Croatia | 1 | 43rd | – | – | – | – | – | – | – | – | – | – | – | – | 43rd | • | |
| Czech Republic | 7 | 9th | – | – | – | – | – | – | – | 9th | 10th | 15th | 13th | 14th | 26th | 22nd | |
| Denmark | 4 | 16th | – | – | – | – | – | – | – | – | – | 16th | 26th | – | 34th | 28th | |
| England | 14 | 4th | 4th | 4th | 4th | 4th | 4th | 4th | 4th | 5th | 6th | 5th | 5th | 5th | 5th | 6th | |
| Finland | 4 | 9th | – | – | – | – | – | – | – | – | – | 9th | 12th | 13th | 15th | •• | |
| France | 4 | 17th | – | – | – | – | – | – | – | – | – | – | 27th | 31st | 33rd | 17th | |
| Germany | 7 | 6th | – | – | – | – | – | – | – | 6th | 8th | 8th | 6th | 9th | 9th | 11th | |
| Greece | 1 | 19th | – | – | – | – | – | – | – | – | – | – | – | – | 19th | • | |
| Haiti | 0 | •• | – | – | – | – | – | – | – | – | – | – | – | – | •• | – | |
| Haudenosaunee | 8 | 3rd | – | – | – | – | – | 5th | 5th | 4th | 4th | 4th | •• | 3rd | 3rd | 3rd | |
| Hong Kong | 6 | 13th | – | – | – | – | – | – | – | – | 14th | 20th | 22nd | 21st | 27th | 13th | |
| Hungary | 1 | 28th | – | – | – | – | – | – | – | – | – | – | – | – | 28th | • | |
| Ireland | 6 | 7th | – | – | – | – | – | – | – | – | 13th | 7th | 9th | 10th | 12th | 12th | |
| Israel | 3 | 7th | – | – | – | – | – | – | – | – | – | – | – | 7th | 7th | 7th | Q |
| Italy | 5 | 9th | – | – | – | – | – | – | – | – | – | 10th | 19th | 18th | 16th | 9th | |
| Jamaica | 2 | 8th | – | – | – | – | – | – | – | – | – | – | – | – | 13th | 8th | |
| Japan | 8 | 4th | – | – | – | – | – | – | 6th | 8th | 5th | 6th | 4th | 8th | 6th | 5th | |
| Latvia | 5 | 14th | – | – | – | – | – | – | – | – | – | 14th | 20th | 19th | 18th | 20th | |
| Luxembourg | 1 | 46th | – | – | – | – | – | – | – | – | – | – | – | – | 46th | – | |
| Kenya | 0 | • | – | – | – | – | – | – | – | – | – | – | – | – | – | • | |
| Mexico | 4 | 15th | – | – | – | – | – | – | – | – | – | – | 29th | 23rd | 38th | 15th | |
| Netherlands | 5 | 8th | – | – | – | – | – | – | – | – | – | 12th | 8th | 16th | 22nd | 14th | |
| New Zealand | 6 | 12th | – | – | – | – | – | – | – | – | 15th | 19th | 15th | 12th | 21st | 24th | |
| Norway | 3 | 17th | – | – | – | – | – | – | – | – | – | – | 24th | 25th | 17th | • | |
| Peru | 2 | 21st | – | – | – | – | – | – | – | – | – | – | – | – | 39th | 21st | |
| Philippines | 2 | 10th | – | – | – | – | – | – | – | – | – | – | – | – | 10th | 30th | |
| Poland | 4 | 14th | – | – | – | – | – | – | – | – | – | – | 14th | 20th | 32nd | 19th | |
| Portugal | 0 | • | – | – | – | – | – | – | – | – | – | – | – | – | – | • | |
| Puerto Rico | 2 | 8th | – | – | – | – | – | – | – | – | – | – | – | – | 8th | 10th | |
| Russia | 2 | 32nd | – | – | – | – | – | – | – | – | – | – | – | 32nd | 36th | – | |
| Scotland | 7 | 6th | – | – | – | – | – | – | – | 7th | 7th | 11th | 7th | 6th | 11th | 16th | |
| Slovakia | 3 | 17th | – | – | – | – | – | – | – | – | – | – | 17th | 26th | 23rd | • | |
| Slovenia | 0 | • | – | – | – | – | – | – | – | – | – | – | – | – | – | • | |
| South Korea | 6 | 11th | – | – | – | – | – | – | – | – | 11th | 18th | 25th | 35th | 35th | 25th | |
| Spain | 4 | 16th | – | – | – | – | – | – | – | – | – | 17th | 16th | 30th | 31st | • | |
| Sweden | 6 | 9th | – | – | – | – | – | – | – | 10th | 9th | – | 10th | 11th | 25th | 23rd | |
| Switzerland | 4 | 15th | – | – | – | – | – | – | – | – | – | – | 23rd | 15th | 20th | 26th | |
| Chinese Taipei | 1 | 41st | – | – | – | – | – | – | – | – | – | – | – | – | 41st | • | |
| Thailand | 1 | 29th | – | – | – | – | – | – | – | – | – | – | – | 29th | – | – | |
| Turkey | 2 | 22nd | – | – | – | – | – | – | – | – | – | – | – | 22nd | 44th | • | |
| Uganda | 3 | 29th | – | – | – | – | – | – | – | – | – | – | – | 34th | 40th | 29th | |
| United States | 14 | 1st | 1st | 1st | 2nd | 1st | 1st | 1st | 1st | 1st | 1st | 2nd | 1st | 2nd | 1st | 1st | |
| Wales | 7 | 11th | – | – | – | – | – | – | – | 11th | 12th | 13th | 11th | 17th | 14th | 18th | |

Legend
| 1st | Champions |
| 2nd | Runners-up |
| 3rd | Third Place |
| • | Did not qualify |
| •• | Withdrew |
| | Hosts |
| – | Did not enter |

== See also ==
- World Lacrosse
- World Lacrosse Women's World Championship
- World Lacrosse Men's U20 Championship
- World Indoor Lacrosse Championship (men)
- Field lacrosse
