= 2023 World Lacrosse Men's Championship =

International men's lacrosse tournament

Tournament details
- Host country: United States
- Venue(s): Snapdragon Stadium; Torero Stadium; SDSU Sports Deck
- Dates: June 21 – July 1
- Teams: 30

Final positions
- Champions: United States (11th title)
- Runners-up: Canada
- Third place: Haudenosaunee
- Fourth place: Australia

Tournament statistics
- Games played: 107
- Attendance: 82,000 (766 per game)
- Scoring leader(s): (Haudenosaunee) Austin Staats

Awards
- MVP: (United States) Brennan O'Neill

The 2023 World Lacrosse Men's Championship was the 14th edition of the international men's field lacrosse tournament for national teams organized by World Lacrosse. Initially scheduled for 2022, it was postponed to 2023 due to the COVID-19 pandemic. The tournament was held in San Diego, California.

The tournament was limited to 30 teams for the first time through regional qualifying tournaments. The United States won the tournament on July 1, 2023, in front of a crowd of 15,112, the championship was its 11th in the history of the event.

== Hosting ==
The Federation of International Lacrosse (FIL), since renamed World Lacrosse, gave its member associations until the end of September 2016 to formally make its intent to bid known to the international sports body and March 2017 to submit their bid. The winning bid was announced in June 2018.

On June 25, 2018, FIL President Sue Redfern announced that Canada will host the 2022 World Lacrosse Championship in Coquitlam, British Columbia. According to the bidding team of the Canadian Lacrosse Association, it chose Coquitlam as the proposed host city for its bid citing the locality's previous hosting experience of the 2008 and 2016 men's U-19 world championships. On 18 October 2019, the organizing committee withdrew its bid to host the event in Coquitlam. Matches were to be held at the Percy Perry Stadium from July 14–23, 2022.

In October 2019, after the withdrawal of the organization, the championship was moved to California with the aim for better promoting lacrosse for a return to the Summer Olympics. In June 2020, the championship was postponed by a year due to the COVID-19 pandemic and the associated postponement of the 2020 Summer Olympics and 2021 World Games to 2021 and 2022 respectively. Los Angeles was named as host city.

In January 2022, the championship was relocated another time, as San Diego was announced as the new host city for 2023. The main venue was Snapdragon Stadium at San Diego State University, with matches also taking place at Torero Stadium at the University of San Diego and three other fields at San Diego State.

== Participating nations ==
The 2023 World Lacrosse Championship is the first World Lacrosse Championship to set a maximum number of competing teams, capping invitations at 30 national teams. Previous world championship rankings determined automatic qualifiers for 2023 and the number of remaining spots allocated to each Continental Federation. The top 10 full member nations at the conclusion of the 2018 world championship automatically qualified for 2023 with regional qualifiers necessary for remaining teams in the European Lacrosse Federation (11 spots), Pan-American Lacrosse Association (4 spots), Asia Pacific Lacrosse Union (4 spots), and the African Association of Lacrosse (1 spot).

In March 2022, due to the 2022 Russian invasion of Ukraine, Russian teams, athletes, and officials were suspended from participation in World Lacrosse events and qualifiers, and it was decided that no World Lacrosse or European Lacrosse Federation events would be held in Russia.

Finland initially qualified through the European qualifiers, however they withdrew due to funding challenges and were replaced by France, who was the next highest ranked European team.

Qualification	Hosts	Date(s)	Spot(s)	Qualifier(s)
2018 World Lacrosse Championship	N/A	12–21 July	10	United States; Canada; Haudenosaunee; Australia; England; Japan; Israel; Germany; Scotland; Ireland
2022 Europe Qualifier	(Poland) Wrocław	11–16 April	11	Wales; Italy; Latvia; Switzerland; Netherlands; Austria; Sweden; Czech Republic; Poland; Denmark; ~~Finland~~; France
2022 Asia Pacific Qualifier	(South Korea) Seogwipo	4–8 October	4	South Korea; Hong Kong; New Zealand; Philippines
2022 Pan-American Qualifier	(Colombia) Medellín	17–22 July	4	Puerto Rico; Jamaica; Mexico; Peru
2022 Africa Qualifier	(Kenya) Nairobi	19 November	1	Uganda

* Finland replaced by France after an announcement that they were unable to travel to the 2023 tournament

=== Schedule ===
- Wednesday, 21 June – Opening Game (United States vs Canada)
- Thursday, 22 June to Monday, 26 June – Pool Play
- Tuesday, 27 June - First Round Playoff Games & Placement Games
- Wednesday, 28 June - Quarterfinal Games & Placement Games
- Thursday, 29 June - Semifinal Games & Placement Games
- Friday, 30 June - Placement Games
- Saturday, 1 July - Bronze and Gold Medal Games

== Pool play ==
=== Pool A ===
Pos	Team	Pld	W	L	GF	GA	GD	Qualification	(United States)	(Canada)	(Haudenosaunee)	(Australia)	(England)
1	United States (Q)	4	4	0	46	16	+30	Advance to quarterfinals	—	7–5	9–7	12–3	18–1
2	Canada (Q)	4	3	1	34	21	+13	Advance to quarterfinals	5–7	—	8–7	10–3	11–4
3	Haudenosaunee (Q)	4	2	2	42	28	+14	Advance to playoff	7–9	7–8	—	10–6	18–5
4	Australia (Q)	4	1	3	20	36	−16	Advance to playoff	3–12	3–10	6–10	—	8–4
5	England (Q)	4	0	4	14	55	−41	Advance to playoff	1–18	4–11	5–18	4–8	—

Source: 2023 World Lacrosse Championship
(Q) Qualified for the phase indicated

=== Pool B ===
Pos	Team	Pld	W	L	GF	GA	GD	Qualification	(Japan)	(Wales)	(France)	(Denmark)	(Uganda)
1	Japan (Q)	4	4	0	70	6	+64	Advance to playoff	—	14–1	15–2	23–3	18–0
2	Wales (Q)	4	3	1	32	30	+2	Qualify for 2nd Place table	1–14	—	7–6	7–6	17–4
3	France (Q)	4	2	2	34	31	+3	Qualify for 15th-30th Placement Games	2–15	6–7	—	13–4	13–5
4	Denmark (Q)	4	1	3	22	45	−23	Qualify for 15th-30th Placement Games	3–23	6–7	4–13	—	9–2
5	Uganda (Q)	4	0	4	11	57	−46	Qualify for 15th-30th Placement Games	0–18	4–17	5–13	2–9	—

Source: 2023 World Lacrosse Championship
(Q) Qualified for the phase indicated

=== Pool C ===
Pos	Team	Pld	W	L	GF	GA	GD	Qualification	(Israel)	(Puerto Rico)	(Philippines)	(Czech Republic)	(Sweden)
1	Israel (Q)	4	4	0	44	17	+27	Advance to playoff	—	12–6	8–4	14–4	10–3
2	Puerto Rico (Q)	4	3	1	45	29	+16	Qualify for 2nd Place table	6–12	—	9–7	14–6	16–4
3	Philippines (Q)	4	2	2	31	24	+7	Qualify for 15th-30th Placement Games	4–8	7–9	—	11–4	9–3
4	Czech Republic (Q)	4	1	3	26	46	−20	Qualify for 15th-30th Placement Games	4–14	6–14	4–11	—	12–7
5	Sweden (Q)	4	0	4	17	47	−30	Qualify for 15th-30th Placement Games	3–10	4–16	3–9	7–12	—

Source: 2023 World Lacrosse Championship
(Q) Qualified for the phase indicated

=== Pool D ===
Pos	Team	Pld	W	L	GF	GA	GD	Qualification	(Jamaica)	(Germany)	(Poland)	(New Zealand)	(Switzerland)
1	Jamaica (Q)	4	4	0	31	18	+13	Advance to playoff	—	5–3	6–4	10–6	10–5
2	Germany (Q)	4	3	1	39	23	+16	Qualify for 2nd Place table	3–5	—	11–8	9–6	16–4
3	Poland (Q)	4	2	2	32	28	+4	Qualify for 15th-30th Placement Games	4–6	8–11	—	11–7	9–4
4	New Zealand (Q)	4	1	3	31	36	−5	Qualify for 15th-30th Placement Games	6–10	6–9	7–11	—	12–6
5	Switzerland (Q)	4	0	4	19	47	−28	Qualify for 15th-30th Placement Games	5–10	4–16	4–9	6–12	—

Source: 2023 World Lacrosse Championship
(Q) Qualified for the phase indicated

=== Pool E ===
Pos	Team	Pld	W	L	GF	GA	GD	Qualification	(Italy)	(Hong Kong)	(Scotland)	(Mexico)	(Austria)
1	Italy (Q)	4	4	0	60	23	+37	Advance to playoff	—	13–5	15–5	13–9	19–4
2	Hong Kong (Q)	4	3	1	37	33	+4	Qualify for 2nd Place table	5–13	—	9–7	14–7	9–6
3	Scotland (Q)	4	2	2	33	36	−3	Qualify for 15th-30th Placement Games	5–15	7–9	—	9–8	12–4
4	Mexico (Q)	4	1	3	39	41	−2	Qualify for 15th-30th Placement Games	9–13	7–14	8–9	—	15–5
5	Austria (Q)	4	0	4	19	55	−36	Qualify for 15th-30th Placement Games	4–19	6–9	4–12	5–15	—

Source: 2023 World Lacrosse Championship
(Q) Qualified for the phase indicated

=== Pool F ===
Pos	Team	Pld	W	L	GF	GA	GD	Qualification	(Republic of Ireland)	(Netherlands)	(Latvia)	(Peru)	(South Korea)
1	Ireland (Q)	4	4	0	48	24	+24	Advance to playoff	—	12–6	8–7	14–9	14–2
2	Netherlands (Q)	4	3	1	30	23	+7	Qualify for 2nd Place table	6–12	—	4–1	8–7	12–3
3	Latvia (Q)	4	2	2	22	22	0	Qualify for 15th-30th Placement Games	7–8	1–4	—	7–6	7–4
4	Peru (Q)	4	1	3	39	34	+5	Qualify for 15th-30th Placement Games	9–14	7–8	6–7	—	17–5
5	South Korea (Q)	4	0	4	14	50	−36	Qualify for 15th-30th Placement Games	2–14	3–12	4–7	5–17	—

Source: 2023 World Lacrosse Championship
(Q) Qualified for the phase indicated

== Playoff Stage ==
All participating teams in Pool A are awarded the 1-5 Seeds based on the Pool A Standings. The remaining 5 Pool winners are awarded the 6-10 Seeds based on their records and Goal Differential. The 4 best Pool Runner-Ups from all pools besides Pool A are awarded the 11-14 Seeds.

=== 2nd Place Table ===
The top 4 teams in the 2nd Place Table make the Championship Playoff Bracket as seeds 11-14. The last place team in this table becomes the 15th seed in the Placement Games

Pos	Team	Pld	W	L	GF	GA	GD	Promotion or relegation
1	Germany (Q)	4	3 (Note: Germany 23 Goals Against vs Puerto Rico 29 Goals Against)	1	39	23	+16	Advance to Playoffs
2	Puerto Rico (Q)	4	3	1	45	29	+16	Advance to Playoffs
3	Netherlands (Q)	4	3	1	30	23	+7	Advance to Playoffs
4	Hong Kong (Q)	4	3	1	37	33	+4	Advance to Playoffs
5	Wales (Q)	4	3	1	32	30	+2	Qualify for Placement Games

Source: 2023 World Lacrosse Championship
(Q) Qualified for the phase indicated

=== Championship Playoff Bracket ===
First round
8	Israel	6
9	Ireland	5
4	Australia	18
13	Netherlands	7
5	England	7^{(OT)}
12	Puerto Rico	6
7	Italy	6
10	Jamaica	7
3	Haudenosaunee	13
14	Hong Kong	3
6	Japan	9
11	Germany	4

Quarterfinals
1	United States	19
8	Israel	3
4	Australia	10
5	England	5
2	Canada	20
10	Jamaica	1
3	Haudenosaunee	10
6	Japan	5

Semifinals
1	United States	11
4	Australia	2
2	Canada	12
3	Haudenosaunee	7

Gold Medal Game
1	United States	10
2	Canada	7
Bronze Medal Game
4	Australia	6
3	Haudenosaunee	11

=== 5th to 8th Place Bracket ===
Teams who lose in the Quarterfinals will play for 5th through 8th Place. Matches based on seedings entering playoffs, with highest 2 seeds playing for 5th place and lowest 2 seeds playing in 7th place.

5th Place Game
5	England	4
6	Japan	8
7th Place Game
8	Israel	8^{(OT)}
10	Jamaica	7

=== 9th to 14th Place Bracket ===
Teams who lose in the First Round playoff will play for 9th through 14th place. The losers of the 8 vs 9 and the 7 vs 10 First Round playoff games receive a "bye" into the second round of this bracket for winning their respective pools.

Round 1
12	Puerto Rico	12
13	Netherlands	2
11	Germany	10
14	Hong Kong	6

Round 2
9	Ireland	6
12	Puerto Rico	7
7	Italy	14
11	Germany	5

9th Place Game
12	Puerto Rico	9
7	Italy	10
11th Place Game
9	Ireland	7
11	Germany	8^{(OT)}

13th Place Game
13	Netherlands	7
14	Hong Kong	10

=== 15th to 18th Placement Games ===
Round 1
15	Wales	6
22	Mexico	7^{(OT)}
18	France	8
19	Latvia	5
17	Poland	8
20	Scotland	9^{(2OT)}
16	Philippines	13
21	Peru	4

Round 2
22	Mexico	10
18	France	8
20	Scotland	4
16	Philippines	11

15th Place Game
22	Mexico	6
16	Philippines	8
17th Place Game
18	France	5
20	Scotland	6

=== 19th to 22nd Place Bracket ===
Teams who lose their first round game in the above bracket play in the below bracket for 19th through 22nd place.

Round 1
15	Wales	8
19	Latvia	5
17	Poland	10
21	Peru	8

19th Place Game
15	Wales	7
17	Poland	5
21st Place Game
19	Latvia	13
21	Peru	7

=== 23rd to 26th Placement Games ===
Round 1
23	New Zealand	15
30	Uganda	2
26	Switzerland	6
27	Sweden	11
25	Czech Republic	9
28	Austria	8
24	Denmark	6
29	South Korea	7

Round 2
23	New Zealand	11
27	Sweden	12
25	Czech Republic	10
29	South Korea	4

23rd Place Game
27	Sweden	7
25	Czech Republic	8^{(OT)}
25th Place Game
23	New Zealand	10
29	South Korea	8

=== 27th to 30th Place Bracket ===
Teams who lose their first round game in the above bracket play in the below bracket for 27th through 30th place.

Round 1
30	Uganda	1
26	Switzerland	13
28	Austria	11
24	Denmark	5

27th Place Game
26	Switzerland	7
28	Austria	4
29th Place Game
30	Uganda	5
24	Denmark	7

== Final standings ==
The top five teams in the final standings will be in Pool A in the 2027 World Lacrosse Men's Championship. Due to its violation of eligibility requirements, the Philippines, which finished 15th in the standings, was shifted to 30th.

Rank	Team	Pld	W	L	GF	GA	GD
1st place, gold medalist(s)	United States	7	7	0	86	28	+58
2nd place, silver medalist(s)	Canada	7	5	2	73	39	+34
3rd place, bronze medalist(s)	Haudenosaunee	8	5	3	83	52	+31
4	Australia	8	3	5	56	70	-14
5	Japan	7	6	1	92	24	+68
6	England	7	1	6	30	79	-49
7	Israel	7	6	1	61	48	+13
8	Jamaica	7	5	2	46	52	-6
9	Italy	7	6	1	90	39	+51
10	Puerto Rico	8	5	3	79	54	+25
11	Germany	8	5	3	66	59	+7
12	Ireland	7	4	3	66	45	+21
13	Hong Kong	7	4	3	56	63	-7
14	Netherlands	7	3	4	46	60	-14
15	Mexico	7	3	4	62	63	-1
16	Scotland	7	4	3	52	60	-8
17	France	7	3	4	55	52	+3
18	Wales	7	5	2	52	57	+6
19	Poland	7	3	4	55	52	+3
20	Latvia	7	3	4	45	45	0
21	Peru	7	1	6	58	70	-12
22	Czech Republic	7	4	3	53	65	-12
23	Sweden	7	2	5	47	72	-25
24	New Zealand	7	3	4	67	58	+9
25	South Korea	7	1	6	33	76	-43
26	Switzerland	7	2	5	45	63	-18
27	Austria	7	1	6	42	76	-34
28	Denmark	7	2	5	40	68	-28
29	Uganda	7	0	7	19	92	-73
30	Philippines	7	5	2	63	38	+25

== Awards ==
The following awards were given out at the end of the tournament.

MVP: (United States) Brennan O'Neill

Best Attacker: (Haudenosaunee) Austin Staats (revoked)

Best Midfielder: (United States) Brennan O'Neill

Best Defenseman: (Haudenosaunee) Jacob Piseno

=== All-World Team ===
Attack	Midfield	Defense	Goalkeeper
(Haudenosaunee) Austin Staats; (Canada) Jeff Teat; (Japan) Shinya Tateishi	(United States) Brennan O'Neill; (United States) Michael Sowers; (Canada) Josh Byrne	(Haudenosaunee) Jacob Piseno; (Canada) Graeme Hossack; (United States) JT Giles-Harris	(United States) Blaze Riorden

== Statistical leaders ==
Rank	Points	Goals	Assists	Faceoffs Won	Save Percentage*
1	(Haudenosaunee) Austin Staats (38)	(Haudenosaunee) Austin Staats (30)	(Haudenosaunee) Randy Staats (17)	(Philippines) John Dugenio (89)	(Latvia) Ryan Richters (65.0)
2	(Italy) Christian Cuccinello (35)	(Japan) Hiroki Kanaya; (Germany) Pers-Anders Olters; (Japan) Shinya Tateishi (21)	(Italy) Christian Cuccinello; (Scotland) Christopher Willox (15)	(Italy) Will Vitelli (74)	(Japan) Shogo Oshima; (United States) Blaze Riorden (59.5)
3	(Japan) Shinya Tateishi (32)			(Wales) Tomos Rosser (68)	
4	(Germany) Pers-Anders Olters (27)		(United States) Rob Pannell; (Israel) Robert Schain; (Mexico) Josh Sanchez; (Canada) Jeff Teat; (Germany) Florian Werner (12)	(Puerto Rico) Nicholas Vazquez (63)	(Philippines) Dan Morris (56.0)
5	(Japan) Hiroki Kanaya; (Italy) John Piatelli (26)	(Italy) Christian Cuccinello (20)		(Japan) Keiji Victor Ishii (61)	(Israel) Andrew Morris (55.6)
6		(Mexico) Will Cabrera (18)		(New Zealand) Will Clarkson (60)	(Republic of Ireland) Joe Walsh (54.2)
7	(Haudenosaunee) Randy Staats (25)	(South Korea) Ethan Ashley; (Republic of Ireland) Conor Foley; (Italy) John Piatelli; (Israel) Nathaniel Solomon (16)		(United States) Trevor Baptiste (59)	(France) Joseph Varela (52.6)
8	(Republic of Ireland) Conor Foley (24)			(United States) TD Ierlan (53)	(Switzerland) Andre Bremgartner; (Puerto Rico) Will Mark (51.9)
9	(Hong Kong) Logan Ip; (Peru) Andrew Ortega; (Mexico) Josh Sanchez (23)		(Japan) Shinya Tateishi (11)	(Scotland) Alex Mulholland (51)	
10			(Canada) Josh Byrne; (Peru) Andrew Ortega; (Italy) John Piatelli; (Germany) Lasse Volquardsen (10)	(Sweden) Luke McCallion (50)	(Australia) Sean Aaron (51.5)

*Minimum of 200 minutes played
