= New Zealand men's national lacrosse team =

New Zealand
- Association: New Zealand Lacrosse
- Confederation: Asia Pacific Lacrosse Union

World Championship
- Appearances: 6 (first in 2002)
- Best result: 12th place (2014)
Medal record
Asia-Pacific Lacrosse Championship
Bronze medal – third place	2007 Auckland
Bronze medal – third place	2011 Auckland
Bronze medal – third place	2023 Seogwipo

The New Zealand men's national lacrosse team represents New Zealand in international lacrosse competition and is organized by New Zealand Lacrosse.

== History ==
A lacrosse team representing New Zealand had a tour in Canada in 1904. It played a series of matches against Canadian sides including the Canada national team on 11 June in Vancouver. However, there are sparse records regarding lacrosse in New Zealand in general for the 20th century.

New Zealand participated in the World Lacrosse Men's Championship for the first time in the 2002 edition in Perth, Australia. At this tournament the New Zealand team played two games against South Korea, three games against Hong Kong and one against Ireland and finished the tournament in 15th place with 1 win (v Hong Kong) and 5 losses. At the 2006 World Lacrosse Men's Championship in London Canada the New Zealand team played against Germany, Czech Republic, Netherlands, South Korea, Bermuda and Hong Kong, finishing the tournament in 19th place with 2 wins (Bermuda and Hong Kong) and four losses. At the 2010 World Men's Lacrosse Championship in Manchester, England the team played against France, Scotland, Latvia (twice), Switzerland, Czech Republic and Spain. The team finished in 15th place with 5 wins (France, Latvia x 2, Switzerland and Spain}. At the 2014 World Men's Lacrosse Championship in Denver, U.S.A the New Zealand team had wins against Argentina, Russia, Wales and Netherlands and losses against Scotland, Japan, Ireland and Sweden and finished the tournament in 12th place. The 2018 World Men's Lacrosse Championship was in Netanya, Israel. The New Zealand team had wins against Spain, Croatia, Hong Kong, Slovakia and Netherlands. Losses were against Puerto Rico, Switzerland and Greece. The team finished the tournament in 21st place. At the 2023 World Men's Lacrosse Championship in San Diego, U.S.A, the New Zealand team had wins against Switzerland, Uganda and South Korea and losses against Germany, Poland, Jamaica and Sweden and finished the tournament in 24th place. .

== Competitive record ==
=== World Lacrosse Championship ===
Year	Host	GP	W	L	GF	GA	Finish
2002	Australia	5	1	4	22	79	14th
2006	Canada	6	2	4	46	76	19th
2010	England	7	5	2	95	49	15th
2014	United States	8	4	4	98	75	12th
2018	Israel	8	5	3	74	65	21st
2023	United States	7	3	4	67	58	24th
Total	−	41	20	21	402	402	No medal

Results 2002. Perth, Australia. V South Korea 2-23 V Hong Kong 9-8 V Ireland 3-19 V South Korea 3-20 V Hong Kong 5-9

2006. London, Canada. V Germany 3-18 V Czech Republic 4-23 V Netherlands 4-15 V South Korea 7-8 V Bermuda 19-6 V Hong Kong 9-6

2010. Manchester, England. V France 18-3 V Scotland 8-18 V Latvia 11-5 V Switzerland 11-3 V Latvia 16-3 V Czech Republic 8-13 V Spain 23-5

2014. Denver, U.S.A V Argentina 19-2 V Russia 16-5 V Wales 13-5 V Netherlands 14-10 V Scotland 12-15 V Japan 8-17 V Ireland 10-12 V Sweden 6-8

2018. Netanya, Isreal. V Spain 9-5 V Croatia 16-2 V Puerto Rico 1-13 V Hong Kong 11-9 V Switzerland 6-9 V Greece 11-12 V Slovakia 10-9 V Netherlands 10-6

2022. Jeju, South Korea. 2023 World Championship qualification tournament. V South Korea 6-7 V Chinese Taipei 10-1 V Hong Kong 7-8 V Philippines 5-4 V China 8-7

2023. San Diego, U.S.A. V Switzerland 12-6 V Germany 6-9 V Poland 7-10 V Jamaica 6-10 V Uganda 15-2 V Sweden 11-12 V South Korea 10-8

2026. Wellington, New Zealand. 2027 World Championship qualification tournament. V Australia 2-29 V South Korea 13-7 V Hong Kong China 10-6 V Philippines 7-12 V Japan 5-9

=== Asia-Pacific Lacrosse Championship ===
Year	Host	GP	W	L	GF	GA	Finish
2015	Thailand	Did not enter					
2017	South Korea	Did not enter					
2019	South Korea	Did not enter					
2026	New Zealand	5	2	3	37	63	4th
Total	−	−	−	−	−	−	2 bronze

Results 2007. Auckland, New Zealand. V Australia U21 2 - 24, V Hong Kong / Korea 12 - 5, V Japan U21 3 - 20, V Australia U21 4 - 19, V Hong Kong / Korea 22 - 5, V Japan U21 6 - 13, V Hong Kong / Korea 17 - 7.

2011. Auckland, New Zealand. V Japan U22 7 - 10, V Australia U23 3 - 15, V U.S.A. West 8 -9, V Hong Kong 15 - 6, V Lax Ratz (Aus) 11 - 10, V U.S.A. West 8 - 9.
