= Asia-Pacific Lacrosse Championship =

Lacrosse competition

- Sport: Field lacrosse
- Founded: 2004
- Countries: APLU member nations
- Most recent champions: M: Australia (4th title); W: Japan (7th title)

The Asia Pacific Lacrosse Championship (also known as the ASPAC Lacrosse Championship) is an international lacrosse competition contested to determine the best lacrosse national team in the Asia Pacific region.

== History ==
The inaugural edition of the Asia Pacific Lacrosse Championship was played in Adelaide, Australia in 2004, the same year the Asia Pacific Lacrosse Union was organized. This was a men's tournament split between two divisions, held from July 3 to 10. The under-21 teams of Japan and Australia were in Division 1, while South Korea played in Division 2. Seven other teams, either club and selection teams, also took part.

The following edition was held in Osaka, Japan in 2005. Since then the competition has been held every two years.

After failed attempts to organize a women's competition in 2005 and 2007, a women's competition has been played since the 2009 edition.

== Results ==
- Some editions saw the participation of non-national team sides including teams from the United States. The Asia Pacific Lacrosse Union maintains a separate ranking solely for its member national teams.

=== Men ===
| # | Year | Host city | Champions | Score | Runners-up | Third place | Score | Fourth place | Ref |
|---|---|---|---|---|---|---|---|---|---|
| 1 | 2004; Details | (Australia); Adelaide | Australia U23 | N/A | Japan U21 | South Korea | N/A | N/A | |
| 2 | 2005; Details | (Japan); Osaka | Australia U21 | 15–9 | Japan U21 | South Korea | 9–3 | Hong Kong | |
| 3 | 2007; Details | (New Zealand); Auckland | Australia U21 | 15–6 | Japan U21 | New Zealand | 17–7 | Hong Kong–Korea (Note: Joint national teams of Hong Kong and South Korea) | |
| 4 | 2009; Details | (South Korea); Suwon | Japan U22 | N/A (Note: Lost 13–15 vs USA West, a non-APLU team) | Australia U22 | South Korea | N/A (Note: Australia 14–5 South Korea) | Hong Kong | |
| 5 | 2011; Details | (New Zealand); Auckland | Japan U22 | 10–9 | Australia U23 | New Zealand | N/A (Note: New Zealand lost 8–9 vs USA West, a non-APLU team) | Hong Kong | |
| 6 | 2013; Details | (China); Beijing | Japan U22 | 15–5 | Australia U23 | Thailand | 11–9 | China | |
| 7 | 2015; Details | (Thailand); Bangkok | Japan U22 | 11–9 | Thailand | Australia U23 | 16–10 | Hong Kong | |
| 8 | 2017; Details | (South Korea); Seogwipo | Japan | 8–6 | Australia | Hong Kong | 8–4 | South Korea | |
| 9 | 2019; Details | (South Korea); Gyeongju | Japan | 9–4 | Australia | South Korea | 6–3 | Hong Kong | |
| 10 | 2026; Details | (New Zealand); Upper Hutt | Australia | 13–3 | Philippines | Japan | 9–5 | New Zealand | |

=== Women ===
| # | Year | Host city | Champions | Score | Runners-up | Third place | Score | Fourth place | Ref |
|---|---|---|---|---|---|---|---|---|---|
| 1 | 2009; Details | (South Korea); Suwon | Japan U22 | N/A (Note: Japan won 43–0 against Team Ehime, a non-APLU team) | Hong Kong | South Korea | N/A (Note: Hong Kong won 13–3 against South Korea in the third place game) | N/A | |
| 2 | 2011; Details | (New Zealand); Auckland | Japan U22 | 20–6 | Australia U23 | New Zealand U19 | N/A (Note: New Zealand U19, lost 6–14 to the Kiwi All Starz, a non-APLU team.) | Hong Kong | |
| 3 | 2013; Details | (China); Beijing | Japan U21 | 15–10 | Australia U23 | South Korea | W–L | China | |
| 4 | 2015; Details | (Thailand); Bangkok | Japan U22 | 22–5 | Australia U23 | South Korea | 19–2 | Hong Kong | |
| 5 | 2017; Details | (South Korea); Seogwipo | Japan | 16–6 | Australia | New Zealand | 12–9 | South Korea | |
| 6 | 2019; Details | (South Korea); Gyeongju | Japan | 15–3 | South Korea | New Zealand | 9–6 | Hong Kong | |
| 7 | 2025; Details | (Australia); Sunshine Coast | Japan | 9–5 | Australia | Philippines | 18–6 | Chinese Taipei | |

== Past results ==
- Note: Teams from APLU-members only

=== Men's ===
| Team | 2004 (Australia) (3) | 2005 (Japan) (4) | 2007 (New Zealand) (4) | 2009 (South Korea) (4) | 2011 (New Zealand) (4) | 2013 (China) (6) | 2015 (Thailand) (8) | 2017 (South Korea) (5) | 2019 (South Korea) (6) | 2026 (New Zealand) (7) | Years |
|---|---|---|---|---|---|---|---|---|---|---|---|
| Australia | 1st | 1st | 1st | 2nd | 2nd | 2nd | 3rd | 2nd | 2nd | 1st | 10 |
| China | | | | | | 4th | 7th | 6th | 6th | 7th | 5 |
| Chinese Taipei | | | | | | | | 5th | 5th | | 2 |
| Hong Kong | | 4th | 4th | 4th | 4th | 6th | 4th | 3rd | 4th | 6th | 9 |
| Japan | 2nd | 2nd | 2nd | 1st | 1st | 1st | 1st | 1st | 1st | 3rd | 10 |
| Malaysia | | | | | | | 8th | | | | 1 |
| New Zealand | | | 3rd | | 3rd | | | | | 4th | 3 |
| Philippines | | | | | | | | | | 2nd | 1 |
| Singapore | | | | | | | 6th | | | | 1 |
| South Korea | 3rd | 3rd | 4th | 3rd | | 5th | 5th | 4th | 3rd | 5th | 9 |
| Thailand | | | | | | 3rd | 2nd | | | | 2 |

=== Women's ===
| Team | 2009 (South Korea) (4) | 2011 (New Zealand) (5) | 2013 (China) (4) | 2015 (Thailand) (6) | 2017 (South Korea) (6) | 2019 (South Korea) (6) | 2025 (Australia) (8) | Years |
|---|---|---|---|---|---|---|---|---|
| Australia | 2nd | 2nd | 2nd | 2nd | 2nd | | 2nd | 6 |
| China | | | 4th | 5th | 6th | 6th | 7th | 5 |
| Chinese Taipei | | | | | 5th | 5th | 4th | 3 |
| Hong Kong | 4th | 4th | 4th | 4th | 3rd | 4th | 6th | 7 |
| Japan | 1st | 1st | 1st | 1st | 1st | 1st | 1st | 7 |
| South Korea | 3rd | 5th | 3rd | 3rd | 4th | 2nd | 8th | 7 |
| New Zealand | | 3rd | | | | 3rd | 5th | 3 |
| Philippines | | | | | | | 3rd | 1 |
| Thailand | | | | 6th | | | | 1 |

== See also ==
- European Lacrosse Championships
- Asia Pacific Floorball Championship
- Asian Netball Championship
