= Japan women's national lacrosse team =

Women's national lacrosse team of Japan

Japan
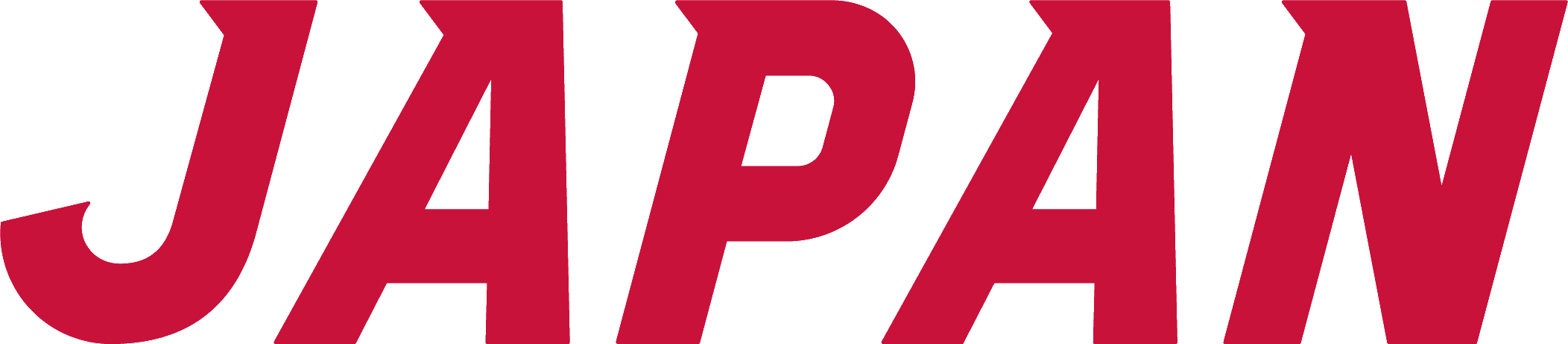
- Association: Japan Lacrosse Association
- Confederation: APLU (Asia Pacific)

World Championship
- Appearances: 9 (first in 1993)
- Best result: 5th place (2005, 2022)

Asia Pacific Championship
- Appearances: 4 (first in 2015)
- Best result: (gold) Champions (2015, 2017, 2019, 2025)

The Japan women's national lacrosse team is governed by the Japan Lacrosse Association. The team's best performance in the World Lacrosse Championship was in the 2005 and 2022 World Lacrosse Women's World Championship when it came in 5th.

== Competitive record ==
=== World Lacrosse Championship ===
| Year | Host | GP | W | L | GF | GA | Finish |
|---|---|---|---|---|---|---|---|
| 2017 | England | 8 | 7 | 1 | 131 | 36 | 9th |
| 2022 | United States | 8 | 7 | 1 | 118 | 44 | 5th |
| 2026 | Japan | 6 | 3 | 3 | 65 | 49 | 7th |
| Total | − | – | – | – | – | – | No Medal |

=== World Games ===
| Year | Host | GP | W | L | GF | GA | Finish |
|---|---|---|---|---|---|---|---|
| 2017 | Poland | 2 | 2 | 0 | 10 | 27 | 5th |
| Total | − | 2 | 2 | 0 | 10 | 27 | No Medal |

=== Asia-Pacific Lacrosse Championship ===
| Year | Host | GP | W | L | GF | GA | Finish |
|---|---|---|---|---|---|---|---|
| 2015 | Thailand | | | | | | 1st place, gold medalist(s) |
| 2017 | South Korea | | | | | | 1st place, gold medalist(s) |
| 2019 | South Korea | 6 | 6 | 0 | 123 | 24 | 1st place, gold medalist(s) |
| 2025 | Australia | 5 | 5 | 0 | 67 | 19 | 1st place, gold medalist(s) |
| Total | − | – | – | – | – | – | 4 gold |
