= 2014 World Lacrosse Championship =

International men's lacrosse tournament

Tournament details
- Host country: United States
- Venue(s): Dick's Sporting Goods Park, Commerce City, Colorado
- Dates: July 10–19
- Teams: 38

Final positions
- Champions: Canada (3rd title)
- Runners-up: United States
- Third place: Haudenosaunee
- Fourth place: Australia

Awards
- MVP: (Canada) Dillon Ward

Official website
- www.worldlacrosse2014.com

The 2014 World Lacrosse Championship was held July 10–19 at Dick's Sporting Goods Park outside Denver, Colorado. 38 nations played 142 games in this international men's lacrosse championship tournament organized by the Federation of International Lacrosse. Nine nations—Belgium, China, Colombia, Costa Rica, Israel, Russia, Thailand, Turkey, and Uganda—all competed in the event for the first time.

In the championship game on July 19, Canada captured its third gold medal by upsetting the United States 8–5 in front of 11,861 fans. Canadian goalie Dillon Ward was named the tournament's Most Valuable Player after he made 10 saves in the championship game, becoming the first goalie to ever receive the honor.

The Iroquois Nationals finished third by defeating Australia 16–5 in the bronze medal game. It marked the first time the Iroquois earned a medal at the World Lacrosse Championship, as well as the first time the Australians failed to earn a medal since 1974.

US Lacrosse, the national host, organized a lacrosse festival for boys' and men's lacrosse teams to play alongside the world championships. Players from around the world competed in 11 age divisions from U11 to 60-and-over.

== Pool play ==
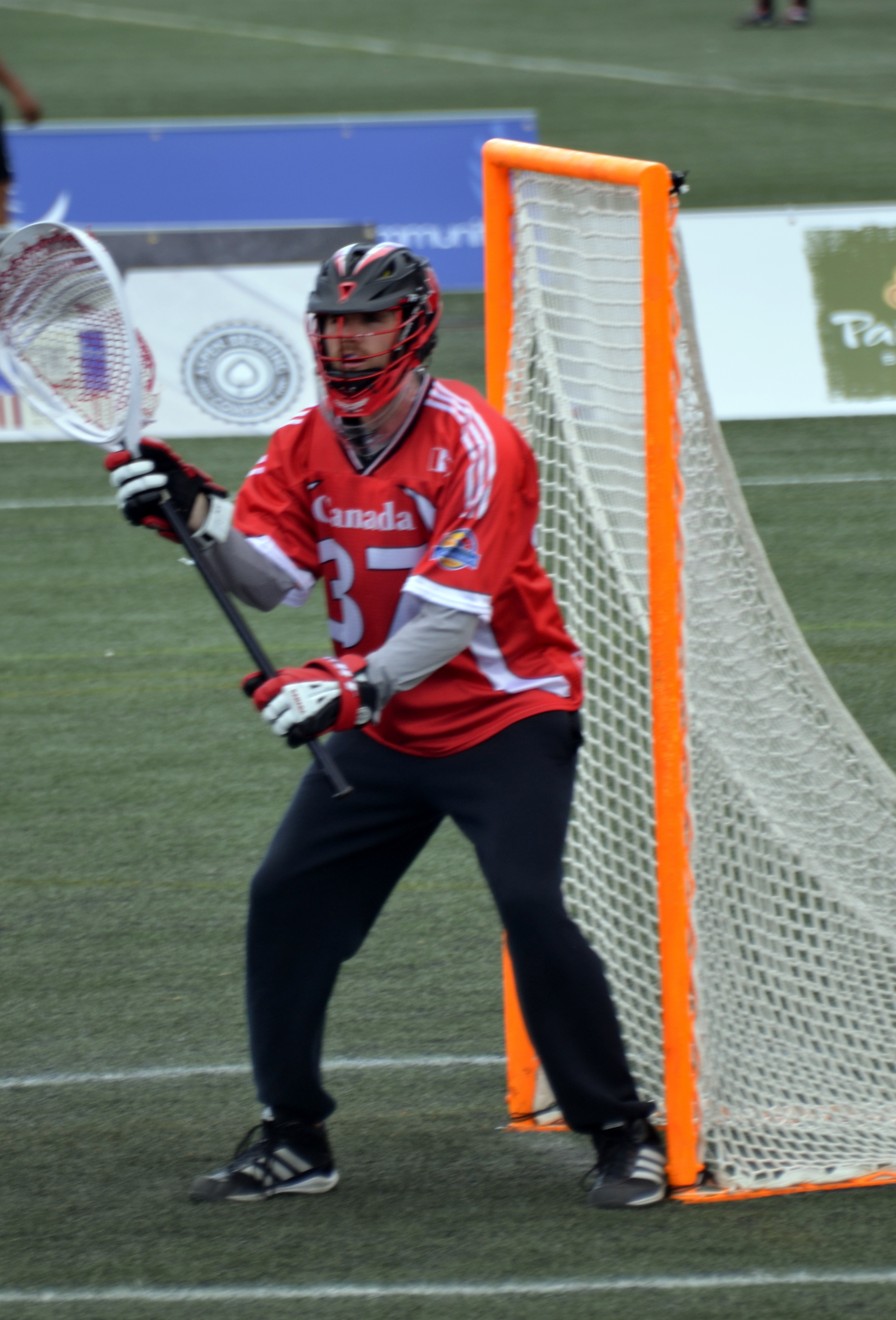
MVP Dillon Ward

For pool play, participating nations were separated into nine divisions. The countries with the top six rankings—Australia, Canada, England, Iroquois, Japan, and the United States—competed in the Blue Division, where the top two teams advanced to the semifinals and the next two teams advanced to the quarterfinals. In the other divisions, each first through fourth place teams were placed in first through fourth play-in brackets.

=== Blue Division ===
After not competing in the 2010 tournament in England due to passport issues, the Iroquois Nationals had to appeal to the FIL to play in the elite Blue Division, usually reserved for the top six teams from the previous championship. After originally placing Germany in the Blue Division, the FIL granted the Iroquois' appeal in 2013.

Team USA coasted through the Blue Division games, only tested by Canada's early 3-0 lead in the opening game of the tournament. But the U.S. scored the next eight goals and ended up putting away their strongest rival 10-7. Canada also easily defeated the lower ranked teams, but needed a goal from Curtis Dickson with 19 seconds remaining to beat the Iroquois Nationals 9-8.

Iroquois, Australia, Japan, and England played several close games for the right to get to the championship bracket. Japan lost a double-overtime game vs Australia but won in overtime over England.

| Pos | Team | Pld | W | L | GF | GA | GD | Qualification |
|---|---|---|---|---|---|---|---|---|
| 1 | United States | 5 | 5 | 0 | 85 | 23 | +62 | Advanced to Semifinals |
| 2 | Canada | 5 | 4 | 1 | 71 | 28 | +43 | Advanced to Semifinals |
| 3 | Haudenosaunee | 5 | 3 | 2 | 64 | 50 | +14 | Advanced to Quarterfinals |
| 4 | Australia | 5 | 2 | 3 | 45 | 60 | −15 | Advanced to Quarterfinals |
| 5 | Japan | 5 | 1 | 4 | 41 | 91 | −50 | Advanced to 5th-8th bracket |
| 6 | England | 5 | 0 | 5 | 27 | 81 | −54 | Advanced to 5th-8th bracket |

10 July 2014
| United States | 10–7 | Canada |
11 July 2014
| Australia | 14–13 (2OT) | Japan |
| England | 4–15 | Haudenosaunee |
12 July 2014
| Japan | 9–24 | Haudenosaunee |
| Australia | 7–16 | United States |
| Canada | 23–3 | England |
13 July 2014
| United States | 21–3 | Japan |
| Haudenosaunee | 8–9 | Canada |
| England | 7–10 | Australia |
14 July 2014
| Japan | 3–20 | Canada |
| England | 1–20 | United States |
| Haudenosaunee | 12–10 | Australia |
15 July 2014
| England | 12–13 (OT) | Japan |
| Haudenosaunee | 5–18 | United States |
| Australia | 4–12 | Canada |

=== Green Division ===
| Pos | Team | Pld | W | L | GF | GA | GD |
|---|---|---|---|---|---|---|---|
| 1 | Netherlands | 3 | 2 | 1 | 44 | 24 | +20 |
| 2 | Italy | 3 | 2 | 1 | 40 | 28 | +12 |
| 3 | Norway | 3 | 2 | 1 | 41 | 28 | +13 |
| 4 | China | 3 | 0 | 3 | 12 | 57 | −45 |

11 July 2014
| Netherlands | 19–4 | China |
| Italy | 14–9 | Norway |
12 July 2014
| Norway | 12–11 (OT) | Netherlands |
| China | 5–18 | Italy |
13 July 2014
| Netherlands | 14–8 | Italy |
| China | 3–20 | Norway |

=== Grey Division ===
| Pos | Team | Pld | W | L | GF | GA | GD |
|---|---|---|---|---|---|---|---|
| 1 | Czech Republic | 3 | 3 | 0 | 39 | 12 | +27 |
| 2 | Poland | 3 | 2 | 1 | 40 | 17 | +23 |
| 3 | Turkey | 3 | 1 | 2 | 21 | 23 | −2 |
| 4 | Costa Rica | 3 | 0 | 3 | 4 | 52 | −48 |

11 July 2014
| Czech Republic | 12–3 | Turkey |
| Poland | 23–1 | Costa Rica |
12 July 2014
| Turkey | 7–9 | Poland |
| Costa Rica | 1–18 | Czech Republic |
13 July 2014
| Czech Republic | 9–8 | Poland |
| Turkey | 11–2 | Costa Rica |

=== Orange Division ===
| Pos | Team | Pld | W | L | GF | GA | GD |
|---|---|---|---|---|---|---|---|
| 1 | Israel | 3 | 3 | 0 | 55 | 8 | +47 |
| 2 | Sweden | 3 | 2 | 1 | 43 | 33 | +10 |
| 3 | Slovakia | 3 | 1 | 2 | 26 | 41 | −15 |
| 4 | (South Korea) Korea | 3 | 0 | 3 | 13 | 55 | −42 |

11 July 2014
| Sweden | 4–19 | Israel |
| Slovakia | 15–6 | (South Korea) Korea |
12 July 2014
| Korea (South Korea) | 5–21 | Sweden |
| Israel | 17–2 | Slovakia |
13 July 2014
| Israel | 19–2 | (South Korea) Korea |
| Sweden | 18–9 | Slovakia |

=== Plum Division ===
| Pos | Team | Pld | W | L | GF | GA | GD |
|---|---|---|---|---|---|---|---|
| 1 | New Zealand | 3 | 3 | 0 | 48 | 12 | +36 |
| 2 | Wales | 3 | 2 | 1 | 26 | 17 | +9 |
| 3 | Russia | 3 | 1 | 2 | 12 | 28 | −16 |
| 4 | Argentina | 3 | 0 | 3 | 6 | 35 | −29 |

11 July 2014
| Wales | 10–2 | Russia |
| New Zealand | 19–2 | Argentina |
12 July 2014
| Wales | 11–2 | Argentina |
| Russia | 5–16 | New Zealand |
13 July 2014
| Wales | 5–13 | New Zealand |
| Russia | 5–2 | Argentina |

=== Red Division ===
| Pos | Team | Pld | W | L | GF | GA | GD |
|---|---|---|---|---|---|---|---|
| 1 | Germany | 3 | 3 | 0 | 53 | 8 | +45 |
| 2 | Hong Kong | 3 | 2 | 1 | 26 | 42 | −16 |
| 3 | Austria | 3 | 1 | 2 | 28 | 34 | −6 |
| 4 | Belgium | 3 | 0 | 3 | 14 | 37 | −23 |

11 July 2014
| Hong Kong | 13–12 (OT) | Austria |
| Germany | 12–4 | Belgium |
12 July 2014
| Austria | 2–20 | Germany |
| Hong Kong | 11–9 | Belgium |
13 July 2014
| Belgium | 1–14 | Austria |
| Germany | 21–2 | Hong Kong |

=== Turquoise Division ===
| Pos | Team | Pld | W | L | GF | GA | GD |
|---|---|---|---|---|---|---|---|
| 1 | Finland | 3 | 3 | 0 | 55 | 4 | +51 |
| 2 | Mexico | 3 | 2 | 1 | 29 | 34 | −5 |
| 3 | Spain | 3 | 1 | 2 | 25 | 34 | −9 |
| 4 | Colombia | 3 | 0 | 3 | 8 | 45 | −37 |

11 July 2014
| Finland | 19–0 | Colombia |
| Spain | 10–14 | Mexico |
12 July 2014
| Colombia | 2–14 | Spain |
| Finland | 18–3 | Mexico |
13 July 2014
| Colombia | 6–12 | Mexico |
| Finland | 18–1 | Spain |

=== White Division ===
| Pos | Team | Pld | W | L | GF | GA | GD |
|---|---|---|---|---|---|---|---|
| 1 | Scotland | 3 | 3 | 0 | 61 | 16 | +45 |
| 2 | Switzerland | 3 | 2 | 1 | 27 | 32 | −5 |
| 3 | Latvia | 3 | 1 | 2 | 26 | 38 | −12 |
| 4 | Thailand | 3 | 0 | 3 | 21 | 49 | −28 |

11 July 2014
| Latvia | 5–10 | Switzerland |
| Scotland | 24–3 | Thailand |
12 July 2014
| Switzerland | 6–20 | Scotland |
| Thailand | 11–14 | Latvia |
13 July 2014
| Thailand | 7–11 | Switzerland |
| Scotland | 17–7 | Latvia |

=== Yellow Division ===
| Pos | Team | Pld | W | L | GF | GA | GD |
|---|---|---|---|---|---|---|---|
| 1 | (Republic of Ireland) Ireland | 3 | 3 | 0 | 53 | 11 | +42 |
| 2 | Bermuda | 3 | 2 | 1 | 28 | 26 | +2 |
| 3 | France | 3 | 1 | 2 | 21 | 33 | −12 |
| 4 | Uganda | 3 | 0 | 3 | 8 | 40 | −32 |

11 July 2014
| Bermuda | 9–7 | France |
| Ireland (Republic of Ireland) | 17–1 | Uganda |
12 July 2014
| Uganda | 5–14 | Bermuda |
| France | 5–22 | (Republic of Ireland) Ireland |
13 July 2014
| Uganda | 2–9 | France |
| Ireland (Republic of Ireland) | 14–5 | Bermuda |

== Play-in brackets ==
Play-in games were played between the teams of all divisions except Blue.

=== First qualified teams ===
14 July
Scotland | 9
Finland | 6
Netherlands | 10
New Zealand | 14

15 July
Scotland | 16
New Zealand | 12
Third place
Finland | 7
Netherlands | 6

14 July
Germany | 9
Czech Republic | 5
(Republic of Ireland) Ireland | 9
Israel | 18

15 July
Germany | 1
Israel | 15
Third place
Czech Republic | 10
(Republic of Ireland) Ireland | 12

- Scotland and Israel advanced to the quarterfinals.

=== Second qualified teams ===
14 July
Switzerland | 12
Mexico | 3
Italy | 7
Wales | 16

15 July
Switzerland | 7
Wales | 5
Third place
Mexico | 10
Italy | 18

14 July
Hong Kong | 4
Poland | 14
Bermuda | 4
Sweden | 19

15 July
Poland | 3
Sweden | 6
Third place
Hong Kong | 15
Bermuda | 11

=== Third qualified teams ===
14 July
Latvia | 21
Spain | 3
Norway | 14
Russia | 7

15 July
Latvia | 15
Norway | 8
Third place
Spain | 6
Russia | 11

14 July
Austria | 2
Turkey | 7
France | 6
Slovakia | 17

15 July
Turkey (OT) | 6
Slovakia | 5
Third place
Austria | 15
France | 4

=== Fourth qualified teams ===
14 July
Thailand | 12
Colombia | 3
China | 9
Argentina | 7

15 July
Thailand | 15
China | 10
Third place
Colombia | 6
Argentina | 13

14 July
Belgium | 18
Costa Rica | 4
Uganda | 10
(South Korea) Korea | 9

15 July
Belgium | 10
Uganda | 4
Third place
Costa Rica | 3
(South Korea) Korea | 23

== Championship bracket ==
After losing to the United States 10–7 in the first game of the tournament, Canada dominated the championship game. They played a deliberate, slow-down offense that is allowed under international rules, combined with strong defense, ground ball play, and goaltending. Like in the first game, Canada jumped out to an early lead, 2–0 after the first quarter. Team USA managed only one goal in the first half, and only put 5 shots on net. At the half, Canada was up 3–1, with Kevin Crowley scoring all three Canadian goals. Crowley got two more in the second half to lead all scorers with 5 points. Canada played even better in the third quarter, scoring five straight goals to increase its lead to 8–2 in the first minutes of the final period. The U.S. added three goals at the end to make the final score 8–5, but they were never in the game in the fourth quarter. Tournament MVP Dillon Ward made 10 saves in goal for Canada. U.S. attackmen Kevin Leveille had three goals and Rob Pannell had three assists.

In the third place game, the Iroquois Nationals easily defeated Australia 16–5 to earn their first medal in international men's field lacrosse. The team earned 4th place in the 1998, 2002, and 2006 tournaments but didn't compete in 2010. The Thompson brothers – Jeremy, Hiana, Miles and Lyle – combined for six goals and five assists.

Quarterfinals; 16 July
Scotland | 8
Haudenosaunee | 10
Israel | 8
Australia | 9

Semifinals; 17 July
Canada | 12
Haudenosaunee | 6
United States | 22
Australia | 3

Gold medal game 19 July
Canada | 8
United States | 5
Bronze medal game
Haudenosaunee | 16
Australia | 5

== Classification brackets ==
=== 5th to 8th place ===
Despite falling to rival England in the fifth-place game, Scotland earned its best-ever finish at the championships by placing sixth. The Scottish team defeated Japan in the previous contest, and are expected to replace the Japanese in the elite Blue Division at the next world championship tournament.

Playing in its first-ever world championships, Israel very nearly duplicated Scotland's feat, twice narrowly falling in games that could have advanced the team into the Blue Division. After reaching the quarterfinals, the Israelis led Australia in the third quarter before dropping a tough 9-8 decision. Then in a placement round game, Israel made a dramatic comeback to push England to overtime before suffering a 10-9 setback. Israel finished seventh after defeating Blue Division squad Japan.

Play-in games 16 July
New Zealand | 8
Japan | 17
Germany | 3
England | 15

5th to 8th place games 17 July
Scotland (2OT) | 10
Japan | 9
Israel | 9
England (OT) | 10

5th place game 19 July
Scotland | 13
England | 15
7th place game
Japan | 10
Israel | 15

=== 9th to 12th Place ===
Play-in games 16 July
Sweden | 8
Finland | 4
Switzerland | 6
(Republic of Ireland) Ireland | 13

9th to 12th place games 17 July
Germany | 13
Sweden | 10
New Zealand | 10
(Republic of Ireland) Ireland | 12

9th place game 18 July
Germany | 8
(Republic of Ireland) Ireland | 6
11th place game
Sweden | 8
New Zealand | 6

=== 13th to 16th Place ===
13th to 16th place games 17 July
Finland | 15
Netherlands | 6
Switzerland | 2
Czech Republic | 8

13th place game 18 July
Finland | 11
Czech Republic | 7
15th place game
Netherlands | 6
Switzerland | 9

=== 17th to 20th place ===
Play-in games 16 July
Turkey | 3
Italy | 11
Latvia | 19
Hong Kong | 9

17th to 20th place games 17 July
Poland | 14
Italy (2OT) | 15
Wales (2OT) | 16
Latvia | 15

17th place game 18 July
Italy | 6
Wales | 18
19th place game
Poland | 7
Latvia | 17

=== 21st to 24th Place ===
21st to 24th place games 17 July
Turkey | 9
Mexico | 4
Hong Kong | 14
Bermuda | 13

21st place game 18 July
Turkey | 4
Hong Kong | 10
23rd place game
Mexico | 12
Bermuda | 8

=== 25th to 28th place ===
Play-in games 16 July
Belgium | 8
Russia | 4
Thailand | 7
Austria | 10

25th to 28th place games 17 July
Slovakia | 6
Belgium | 3
Norway (OT) | 11
Austria | 10

25th place game 18 July
Slovakia | 3
Norway | 14
27th place game
Belgium | 7
Austria | 6

=== 29th to 32nd Place ===
29th to 32nd place games 17 July
Russia | 5
Spain | 9
Thailand | 14
France | 4

29th place game 18 July
Spain | 6
Thailand | 12
31st place game
Russia | 7
France | 15

=== 33rd to 38th place ===
33rd to 36th place games 17 July
Uganda | 11
Argentina | 5
(South Korea) Korea | 15
China | 16

33rd place game 18 July
Uganda | 7
China | 14
35th place
Argentina | 7
(South Korea) Korea | 10

| 37th place game 17 July |
| Costa Rica | 4 |
| Colombia | 11 |

== Final standings ==
| Rank | Team | Div | Pld | W | L | GF | GA | GD |
|---|---|---|---|---|---|---|---|---|
| 1st place, gold medalist(s) | Canada | 2 | 7 | 6 | 1 | 91 | 39 | +52 |
| 2nd place, silver medalist(s) | United States | 1 | 7 | 6 | 1 | 112 | 34 | +78 |
| 3rd place, bronze medalist(s) | Haudenosaunee | 3 | 8 | 5 | 3 | 96 | 75 | +21 |
| 4 | Australia | 4 | 8 | 3 | 5 | 62 | 106 | -44 |
| 5 | England | 6 | 8 | 3 | 5 | 67 | 106 | -39 |
| 6 | Scotland | 1 | 8 | 6 | 2 | 117 | 68 | +49 |
| 7 | Israel | 1 | 8 | 6 | 2 | 120 | 47 | +73 |
| 8 | Japan | 5 | 8 | 2 | 6 | 77 | 124 | -47 |
| 9 | Germany | 1 | 8 | 6 | 2 | 87 | 59 | +28 |
| 10 | (Republic of Ireland) Ireland | 1 | 8 | 6 | 2 | 105 | 63 | +42 |
| 11 | Sweden | 2 | 8 | 6 | 2 | 94 | 63 | +31 |
| 12 | New Zealand | 1 | 8 | 4 | 4 | 98 | 75 | +23 |
| 13 | Finland | 1 | 8 | 6 | 2 | 98 | 40 | +58 |
| 14 | Czech Republic | 1 | 7 | 4 | 3 | 69 | 46 | +23 |
| 15 | Switzerland | 2 | 8 | 5 | 3 | 63 | 67 | -4 |
| 16 | Netherlands | 1 | 7 | 2 | 5 | 72 | 69 | +3 |
| 17 | Wales | 2 | 7 | 5 | 2 | 81 | 52 | 29 |
| 18 | Italy | 2 | 8 | 5 | 3 | 97 | 89 | +8 |
| 19 | Latvia | 3 | 8 | 5 | 3 | 113 | 81 | +32 |
| 20 | Poland | 2 | 7 | 3 | 4 | 78 | 59 | +19 |
| 21 | Hong Kong | 2 | 8 | 5 | 3 | 78 | 103 | -25 |
| 22 | Turkey | 3 | 8 | 4 | 4 | 50 | 55 | -5 |
| 23 | Mexico | 2 | 7 | 3 | 4 | 58 | 72 | -14 |
| 24 | Bermuda | 2 | 7 | 2 | 5 | 64 | 86 | -22 |
| 25 | Norway | 3 | 7 | 5 | 2 | 88 | 63 | +25 |
| 26 | Slovakia | 3 | 7 | 3 | 4 | 57 | 70 | -13 |
| 27 | Belgium | 4 | 8 | 4 | 4 | 60 | 61 | -1 |
| 28 | Austria | 3 | 8 | 3 | 5 | 71 | 70 | +1 |
| 29 | Thailand | 4 | 8 | 4 | 4 | 81 | 82 | -1 |
| 30 | Spain | 3 | 7 | 2 | 5 | 49 | 83 | -34 |
| 31 | France | 3 | 7 | 2 | 5 | 50 | 76 | -26 |
| 32 | Russia | 3 | 8 | 2 | 6 | 46 | 80 | -34 |
| 33 | China | 4 | 7 | 3 | 4 | 61 | 101 | -40 |
| 34 | Uganda | 4 | 7 | 2 | 5 | 40 | 78 | -38 |
| 35 | (South Korea) Korea | 4 | 7 | 2 | 5 | 70 | 91 | -21 |
| 36 | Argentina | 4 | 7 | 1 | 6 | 38 | 71 | -33 |
| 37 | Colombia | 4 | 6 | 1 | 5 | 28 | 74 | -46 |
| 38 | Costa Rica | 4 | 6 | 0 | 6 | 15 | 104 | -89 |

== Awards ==
The following awards were given out at the end of the tournament.

MVP: (Canada) Dillon Ward
Outstanding Attackman: (United States) Rob Pannell
Outstanding Midfielder: (United States) Paul Rabil
Outstanding Defenseman: (United States) Tucker Durkin
Outstanding Goalie: (Canada) Dillon Ward

=== All-World Team ===
| Attack | Midfield | Defense | Goaltender |
|---|---|---|---|
| (Canada) Curtis Dickson (United States) Rob Pannell (Haudenosaunee) Lyle Thompson | (United States) Paul Rabil (Haudenosaunee) Jeremy Thompson (United States) David Lawson | (United States) Tucker Durkin (Canada) Brodie Merrill (Canada) Kyle Rubisch | (Canada) Dillon Ward |

=== The President's Team ===
The President's Team consisted of the following players, honored for being the top 10 players in the tournament not competing in the Blue Division.

(Scotland) Kyle Buchanan
(Republic of Ireland) Ryan Licht
(Scotland) Matt MacGrotty
(Scotland) Jimmy McBride
(Scotland) Jordan McBride
(Czech Republic) Jonathan Munk
(Sweden) Kevin Powers
(Israel) Ben Smith
(Israel) Ari Sussman
(Netherlands) James Van de Veerdon

== See also ==
- Federation of International Lacrosse, the unified governing body for world lacrosse founded in 2008
- World Lacrosse Championship
- Field lacrosse
