= Hong Kong, China Lacrosse Association =

Lacrosse governing body in Hong Kong

- Sport: Lacrosse
- Jurisdiction: National
- Abbreviation: HKLA
- Founded: 1993
- Affiliation: World Lacrosse
- Affiliation date: 2002
- Regional affiliation: APLU
- Affiliation date: 2004
- Headquarters: North Point, Hong Kong

Official website
- www.hklax.org
- (Hong Kong)

The Hong Kong, China Lacrosse Association (HKLA; 中國香港棍網球總會) is the governing body of lacrosse in Hong Kong. Founded in 1993, HKLA is a member Of World Lacrosse, Asia Pacific Lacrosse Union (APLU), as well as Sports Federation & Olympic Committee Hong Kong, China (SF&OC).

The representative teams organized by the association regularly participates in international and regional tournaments, both in Field lacrosse and Box Lacrosse.

== History ==
Lacrosse was introduced in the then British colony of Hong Kong in 1963 by Graeme Large and Murray MacKenzie at the University of Hong Kong (HKU). Eventually graduates from the HKU led by Louis Hou went on to form the Hong Kong Lacrosse Association (HKLA) in 1993.

An official men's lacrosse team was formed which took part at the Lacrosse Beijing Cup in June 2001 at the Beijing University of Physical Education.

Hong Kong became a member of the International Lacrosse Federation (ILF) in 2002. The men's team debuted at the 2002 World Lacrosse Championship in Perth, Australia. The HKLA is among the founding members of the Asia Pacific Lacrosse Union which was established in 2004. The women's national team first competed at the 2006 Prague Cup.

Lacrosse leagues were established in Hong Kong; the Hong Kong Men's Lacrosse League in 2003 and the Women's League in 2012.

In 2010, the HKFA became a member of the Federation of International Lacrosse (FIL; later renamed World Lacrosse).

The HKLA became an observer member of the Sports Federation and Olympic Committee of Hong Kong, China in 2016.

In 2022, the HKLA, added "China" to its name becoming the "Hong Kong, China Lacrosse Association".

== Tournaments ==
The HKLA has maintained a men's and women's lacrosse league in Hong Kong. The association also organizes the Hong Kong Lacrosse Open, which was first organized in 2002.
