= 2019 Asia-Pacific Lacrosse Championship =

International lacrosse competition

Tournament details
- Host country: South Korea
- Venue: 1 (in 1 host city)
- Dates: 22–29 June
- Teams: 7

The 2019 Asia-Pacific Lacrosse Championships is an international lacrosse competition held in Gyeongju, South Korea from 21 to 29 June 2019. Both a men's and women's tournament was held in this iteration of the Asia-Pacific Lacrosse Championship

== Venue ==
Gyeongju
Gyeongju Soccer Park Field Nos. 5 and 6
Capacity: N/A
2019 Asia-Pacific Lacrosse Championship (South Korea)

== Men's ==
2019 Asia-Pacific Men's Lacrosse Championship
Tournament details
- Teams: 6

Final positions
- Champions: Japan
- Runners-up: Australia
- Third place: South Korea
- Fourth place: Hong Kong

=== Round robin ===
Pos	Team	Pld	W	L	GF	GA	GD	Qualification
1	Australia	5	5	0	73	11	+62	Semifinals
2	Japan	5	4	1	59	9	+50	Semifinals
3	Hong Kong	5	3	2	30	36	−6	Semifinals
4	South Korea (H)	5	2	3	19	40	−21	Semifinals
5	Chinese Taipei	5	1	4	19	40	−21	Fifth place game
6	China	5	0	5	7	71	−64	Fifth place game

Source: APLU
(H) Hosts

22 June 2019; 10:30	Chinese Taipei	0–13	Australia	Gyeongju Soccer Park, Gyeongju

Game reference

22 June 2019; 13:30	South Korea	9–4	China	Gyeongju Soccer Park, Gyeongju

Game reference

22 June 2019; 16:30	Hong Kong	0–14	Japan	Gyeongju Soccer Park, Gyeongju

Game reference

23 June 2019; 10:30	South Korea	6–3	Chinese Taipei	Gyeongju Soccer Park, Gyeongju

Game reference

23 June 2019; 13:30	China	1–15	Hong Kong	Gyeongju Soccer Park, Gyeongju

Game reference

23 June 2019; 18:30	Australia	8–7	Japan	Gyeongju Soccer Park, Gyeongju

Game reference

24 June 2019; 10:30	Chinese Taipei	12–1	China	Gyeongju Soccer Park, Gyeongju

Game reference

24 June 2019; 13:30	Hong Kong	4–13	Australia	Gyeongju Soccer Park, Gyeongju

Game reference

24 June 2019; 16:30	Japan	6–0	South Korea	Gyeongju Soccer Park, Gyeongju

Game reference

25 June 2019; 10:30	China	0–17	Australia	Gyeongju Soccer Park, Gyeongju

Game reference

25 June 2019; 13:30	Chinese Taipei	0–14	Japan	Gyeongju Soccer Park, Gyeongju

Game reference

25 June 2019; 18:30	South Korea	4–5	Hong Kong	Gyeongju Soccer Park, Gyeongju

Game reference

26 June 2019; 10:30	Japan	18–1	China	Gyeongju Soccer Park, Gyeongju

Game reference

26 June 2019; 13:30	Hong Kong	6–4	Chinese Taipei	Gyeongju Soccer Park, Gyeongju

Game reference

26 June 2019; 16:30	Australia	22–0	South Korea	Gyeongju Soccer Park, Gyeongju

Game reference

=== Final round ===
==== Brackets ====
Semifinals
B1	Australia	15
A2	South Korea	2
A1	Japan	14
B2	Hong Kong	1

Final
B1	Australia	4
A1	Japan	9
Third place game
A2	South Korea	6
B2	Hong Kong	3

Fifth place
P1	Chinese Taipei	10
P2	China	2

==== Semifinals ====
28 June 2019; 10:30	Australia	15–2	South Korea	Gyeongju Soccer Park, Gyeongju

Game reference

28 June 2019; 13:30	Japan	14–1	Hong Kong	Gyeongju Soccer Park, Gyeongju

Game reference

===== 5th place game =====
28 June 2019; 18:30	Chinese Taipei	15–2	China	Gyeongju Soccer Park, Gyeongju

Game reference

==== 3rd place game ====
29 June 2019; 12:00	South Korea	6–3	Hong Kong	Gyeongju Soccer Park, Gyeongju

Game reference

==== Final ====
29 June 2019; 17:30	Australia	4–9	Japan	Gyeongju Soccer Park, Gyeongju

Game reference

== Women's ==
2019 Asia-Pacific Women's Lacrosse Championship
Tournament details
- Teams: 6

Final positions
- Champions: Japan
- Runners-up: South Korea
- Third place: New Zealand
- Fourth place: Hong Kong

=== Round robin ===
Pos	Team	Pld	W	L	GF	GA	GD	Qualification
1	Japan	5	5	0	108	21	+87	Final
2	South Korea (H)	5	4	1	78	30	+48	Final
3	New Zealand	5	3	2	65	45	+20	Third place game
4	Hong Kong	5	2	3	44	64	−20	Third place game
5	China	5	1	4	28	92	−64	Fifth place game
6	Chinese Taipei	5	0	5	15	86	−71	Fifth place game

Source: APLU
(H) Hosts

22 June 2019; 11:00	South Korea	19–3	China	Gyeongju Soccer Park, Gyeongju

Game reference

22 June 2019; 14:00	Hong Kong	9–3	Chinese Taipei	Gyeongju Soccer Park, Gyeongju

Game reference

22 June 2019; 18:30	Japan	13–9	New Zealand	Gyeongju Soccer Park, Gyeongju

Game reference

23 June 2019; 11:00	China	4–16	Hong Kong	Gyeongju Soccer Park, Gyeongju

Game reference

23 June 2019; 17:00	South Korea	21–1	Chinese Taipei	Gyeongju Soccer Park, Gyeongju

Game reference

24 June 2019; 14:00	Chinese Taipei	7–14	China	Gyeongju Soccer Park, Gyeongju

Game reference

24 June 2019; 18:30	Hong Kong	8–16	South Korea	Gyeongju Soccer Park, Gyeongju

Game reference

25 June 2019; 11:00	South Korea	7–11	Japan	Gyeongju Soccer Park, Gyeongju

Game reference

25 June 2019; 17:00	New Zealand	13–8	South Korea	Gyeongju Soccer Park, Gyeongju

Game reference

26 June 2019; 14:00	Chinese Taipei	4–16	New Zealand	Gyeongju Soccer Park, Gyeongju

Game reference

26 June 2019; 18:30	Japan	28–3	Hong Kong	Gyeongju Soccer Park, Gyeongju

Game reference

27 June 2019; 13:00	China	2–30	Japan	Gyeongju Soccer Park, Gyeongju

Game reference

27 June 2019; 16:00	New Zealand	7–15	South Korea	Gyeongju Soccer Park, Gyeongju

Game reference

28 June 2019; 13:00	Japan	26–0	Chinese Taipei	Gyeongju Soccer Park, Gyeongju

Game reference

28 June 2019; 16:00	China	5–20	New Zealand	Gyeongju Soccer Park, Gyeongju

Game reference

=== Final round ===
==== 5th place game ====
29 June 2019; 10:00	Chinese Taipei	9–8	China	Gyeongju Soccer Park, Gyeongju

Game reference

==== 3rd place game ====
29 June 2019; 13:00	New Zealand	9–6	Hong Kong	Gyeongju Soccer Park, Gyeongju

Game reference

==== Final ====
29 June 2019; 17:30	Japan	15–3	South Korea	Gyeongju Soccer Park, Gyeongju

Game reference

=== Qualification for the World Championship ===
Japan and New Zealand already qualified for the 2022 World Lacrosse Women's Championship. For the purpose of qualification the top two teams among the remaining four teams, discounting matches involving Japan and New Zealand, qualified for the international tournament. Additionally China was given a berth after Kenya withdrew.

Pos	Team	Pld	W	L	GF	GA	GD	Qualification
1	South Korea (H)	3	3	0	56	12	+44	2022 World Championship
2	Hong Kong	3	2	1	33	23	+10	2022 World Championship
3	China	3	1	2	21	42	−21	2022 World Championship (wild card)
4	Chinese Taipei	3	0	3	11	44	−33	

Source: APLU
(H) Hosts

== Final standings ==
Men's		Women's	
Rank	Team	Rank	Team
1st place, gold medalist(s)	Japan	1st place, gold medalist(s)	Japan
2nd place, silver medalist(s)	Australia	2nd place, silver medalist(s)	South Korea
3rd place, bronze medalist(s)	South Korea	3rd place, bronze medalist(s)	New Zealand
4	Hong Kong	4	Hong Kong
5	Chinese Taipei	5	China
6	China	6	Chinese Taipei
