= Thailand Lacrosse Association =

Sports governing body in Thailand

- Sport: Lacrosse
- Jurisdiction: National
- Founded: January 1, 2010
- Affiliation: World Lacrosse
- Affiliation date: 2010
- Headquarters: Bangkok, Thailand
- President: Payu Nerngchamnong
- Vice president: Naputt Assakul
- Coach: Dylan Sheridan

Official website
- www.thailandlacrosse.org
- (Thailand)

Thailand Lacrosse Association (also known as TLA) is the sanctioned governing body of men's and women's lacrosse in Thailand, based out of Bangkok, Thailand. The official representative of Thailand to the Federation of International Lacrosse, currently an Associate Member to FIL. Originally started by several Thais who attended school in America, and played the sport. Thailand Lacrosse quickly gained many members who never play the sport before. TLA focus on introducing and developing the game of lacrosse in Thailand, pursuing the growth in all level of the game. While the Men's National team target to be one of the most competitive team in Asia, and help marketing, and spreading the word of lacrosse in Asia to the rest of the world.

== History ==
Thailand Lacrosse was founded in January 2010, in Bangkok, Thailand by Payu Nerngchamnong, Naputt Assakul, and Pinyot Pibulsongram; the three Thais who used to play lacrosse back when they were attending schools in America. While Payu worked on structuring, planning and promoting the program, the other two help gathered other former Thai players to join. From the word of mouth, and through the use of social media outlets (Facebook, Twitter). The Thais who've played, and never play before start showing up for a casual weekly practices at the soccer facility at the heart of Bangkok. Thailand Lacrosse grew very quickly from there, so much so that they were confirmed as an Associate Member by the Federation of International Lacrosse (FIL) in July of that same year. It was the quickest confirmation for an international program in the history of FIL (6 months), unfortunately the team could not participated in the FIL World Lacrosse Championship 2010 in Manchester, United Kingdom. Although Thailand did play two games at the International level that year against the Hong Kong National team, once in Thailand, and another later that year in Bangkok. Both time Thailand defeated Hong Kong National team, and kept the Friendly Cup Trophy in Thailand. Thailand only defeat came at the hand of Singapore in 2011, in a 10-9 thriller at the Yamaha Stadium. Thailand bounced back from the loss, and defeated Hong Kong once again in Bangkok with the final score of 20-14. Recently, Thailand defeated Singapore 9-2 in Bangkok, Thailand.

While the national team's progress has been described as promising for a young program, TLA also focuses its efforts on "Growing the Game" in Thailand. TLA hosted an FIL clinic in early 2011, followed by an exhibition game in Bangkok called the Grow The Game Invitational with the Lacrosse All-Stars Lacrosse network that hosted the Thailand lacrosse blog. Players from America and other parts of the world came to participate in a friendly game in front of Thai crowds. On top of the work on the national program, TLA is working on helping local universities and schools start lacrosse programs in their institutions. Since then, the national team has competed in many games and tournaments within the region, including the ASPAC2013 in Beijing, the regional championship where the team finished 3rd behind Japan and Australia. While maintaining its commitment to lacrosse development in Thailand, TLA continues to set up development clinics within various lower and upper educational institutions. The team focused on the FIL World Lacrosse Championship 2014, in Denver, Colorado. This was the first time for Thailand at the World Games and marked a milestone in Thailand Lacrosse history.

== TLA structure and positions ==
Executive Committee

- Payu Nerngchamnong - President
- Naputt Assakul - Vice President
- Minway Chi

General Committee

- Paul Kanjanapas
- Tod Vongsiridej
- Pinyot Pibulsongram

Senior Association Coordinators

- Leon Bennett - Legal Advisor
- Krip Torpucksa - Team Coordinator
- Lena Welch - Director of Communication

Development Officers

- Sean Lindsay - Development / Offensive Coordinator
- Chazz Woodson - Development / Offensive Coordinator

== Facility ==
SCG Stadium Surface: Natural Grass Location: Impact, Muangthong Thani Seating Capacity: 25,000 Seats

Info: The home stadium of the Thailand Premier League Professional Soccer team, the SCG Muangthong United F.C. It is used as the home field, and practice facility of the men's national lacrosse team since 2010. Thailand Lacrosse is the only member of the FIL 43 member nations that has its own stadium facility. The 25,000 seating stadium had hosted 3 lacrosse games, with the fourth game scheduled there was moved to an alternate site due to the flood crisis in Bangkok at the end of 2010. The first ever international lacrosse game between Thailand and Hong Kong was played here on October 22, 2010. The stadium lies within the compound belongs to IMPACT Convention and Exhibition center, the official sponsor/partner of Thailand Lacrosse Association since 2010.

Arena 10 - Indoor Soccer Surface: Artificial Turf Location: Arena 10, Thonglor Soi 10 Seating Capacity: N/A

Info: Originally designed for indoor soccer, the facility sits at the heart of Bangkok downtown. The practice facility open to all the members of Thailand Lacrosse Association, the indoor soccer facility is used by TLA since the beginning of 2010. The two hours practice is held at 7pm on Tuesday, and Thursday of every week. The field is also used to host the FIL development clinic, as well as the referee clinic.

Thailand Lacrosse Association Office Location: Bangkok, Thailand Open: Late 2012

The temporary office of Thailand Lacrosse located on Pattanakarn Road in Bangkok, which serves as a meeting point for TLA committee, and to conduct other TLA businesses. The TLA store is also located at this same location for any Thai who looking to purchase lacrosse gears; however, only the TLA official partner's products are offered at the TLA store.

== Thailand National Team ==
The Men's National Team roster is provided by Thailand Lacrosse Official Website. The list made up of the pool of Thai players from different parts of the world, some originally from Thailand, some are Thai-American who grew up in America. As well as expat players who's living in Thailand who conform to the regulations, and certified by the FIL to play for Thailand.

Attack Tod Vongsiridej (Thailand) (United States) Kiddee Charoenpanitkul (Thailand) Chatch Sirisuth (Thailand) (United States)

Midfield Art Thamasangvarn (Thailand) (United States) Kohei Naoi (Japan) Nolt Vutthisak (Thailand) Supares Dangkhum (Thailand) Pyap Suraphongchai (Thailand) Micheal Pansiri (Thailand) (United States) Liew Rust (Thailand) (United States) Devin Umrarong (Thailand) (United States)

Defense Korn Poonsirivong (Thailand) Tanu Pirapokin (Thailand) Surasak Poomngern (Thailand) Phum Pattana-Anek (Thailand) Cory Maceachen (Thailand) (United States) John Sirisuth (Thailand) (United States)

Goalie Pongprapat Suriyodorn (Thailand) (United States) Alex Watthanawekin (Thailand)

Coaches Dylan Sheridan (United States) Andy German (United States) Brand Closen (United States) Steve Goodwin (United States)

Staffs Krip Torpucksa (Thailand) Matt Smith (Australia)

== Mascot/logo ==
Team Thailand's mascot is Singha (Thai: สิงห์, correctly pronounced sing, but typically pronounced by foreigners as sing-ha, reflecting the Latin spelling) is a powerful mythological lion, found in ancient Thai and Hindu stories. The design of it was derived from the official symbol of Singha Beer, the main partner of Thailand Lacrosse Association. TLA received a special permission from Boon Rawd Brewery to use and develop their logo to be use as the official mascot of TLA, which are being used on the team's helmet, and team apparel.

== Sponsors ==
The following are the sponsors of Thailand Lacrosse Association for 2017 season

Official partners

- Enigma Competition
- Oakleys
- B-Quik

Period	Uniform	Equipment
2010	(United States) Nike	(United States) Maverik
2011	(United States) Pro Athletic	(United States) STX
2012	(United States) Pro Athletic	(United States) STX
2013	(Thailand) Enigma	(United States) STX
2014	(United States) Nike	(United States) Warrior
2015	(Thailand) Warrix	(United States) Maverik
2016	(Thailand) Warrix	(United States) Maverik
2017	(Japan) Vasallo	(United States) Warrior
