= Japan men's national lacrosse team =

Men's national lacrosse team of Japan

Japan
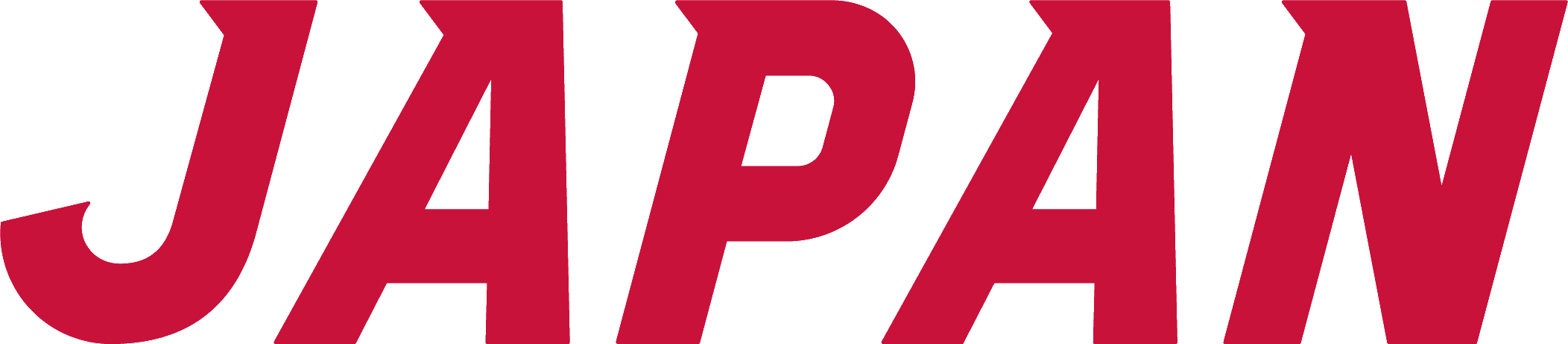
- Association: Japan Lacrosse Association
- Confederation: APLU (Asia Pacific)

World Championship
- Appearances: 6 (first in 1994)
- Best result: 4th place (2010)

Asia Pacific Championship
- Appearances: 10 (first in 2004)
- Best result: (gold) Champions (2009, 2011, 2013, 2015, 2017, 2019)

First international
- Japan 0–56 Australia (June 1989; Tokyo, Japan)

The Japan men's national lacrosse team is the national team that represents Japan in international lacrosse competitions. It is governed by the Japan Lacrosse Association.

== History ==
Japan had its first international game against Australia at the Komazawa Olympic Park Stadium in Tokyo. Japan lost 0–56 in the game held in June 1989.

The team's best performance in the World Lacrosse Championship was in the 2010 World Lacrosse Championship, when it came in fourth. The team came in eighth in the 2014 World Lacrosse Championship, and fifth in the 2023 World Lacrosse Championship.
