= Asia Pacific Lacrosse Union =

Governing body of lacrosse in Asia and Oceania

- Sport: Lacrosse
- Jurisdiction: Asia and Oceania
- Membership: 11 full members 4 associate members 7 provisional members
- Abbreviation: APLU
- Founded: 2004
- Affiliation: World Lacrosse

Official website
- www.asiapacificlacrosse.org

The Asia Pacific Lacrosse Union (APLU) is the governing body for the sport of lacrosse in Asia and Oceania.

It was founded in 2004, with four national lacrosse associations of Australia, Hong Kong, South Korea, and Japan as its founding members. Within the same year the first edition of the Asia Pacific Lacrosse Championship was held in Australia. It currently has 19 member national associations (9 full members, 10 provisional members) with World Lacrosse as an affiliate member of the APLU.

== Members ==
Country	Association	Year
Australia	Lacrosse Australia	2004 (Full)
Cambodia	Cambodia Lacrosse Federation	2022 (Provisional)
China	China Lacrosse Association	2009 (Affiliate), 2012 (Associate); 2013 (Full)
Hong Kong	Hong Kong, China Lacrosse Association	2004 (Full)
India	Lacrosse Association of India	2009 (Associate); 2024 (Full)
Indonesia	Indonesia Lacrosse Federation	2022 (Provisional)
Iran	Iran Lacrosse Association	2022 (Provisional)
Japan	Japan Lacrosse Association	2004 (Full)
South Korea	Korea Lacrosse Association	2004 (Full)
Malaysia	Malaysia Lacrosse Associatio	2015 (Associate)
Mongolia	Mongolian Lacrosse Federation	2017 (Associate)
New Zealand	New Zealand Lacrosse Association	2005 (Full)
Pakistan	Pakistan Lacrosse Federation	2023 (Provisional)
Philippines	Philippines Lacrosse Association	2019 (Associate); 2022 (Full)
Qatar	Qatar Lacrosse Association	2018 (Associate)
Saudi Arabia	Saudi Lacrosse Federation	2021 (Provisional); 2024 (Full)
Singapore	Singapore Lacrosse Association	2013 (Associate); 2015 (Full)
Thailand	Thailand Lacrosse Association	2013 (Associate); 2015 (Full)
Uzbekistan	Uzbekistan Lacrosse Federation	2023 (Provisional)
Vietnam	Vietnam Lacrosse Association	2022 (Provisional)

- Note: "Associate" membership status name is changed to "Provisional" in 2021 in line with World Lacrosse standards.

== Tournaments ==
- Asia-Pacific Lacrosse Championship
- Asia-Pacific Sixes Lacrosse Championships
- Asian Lacrosse Games
