= 2020 European Lacrosse Championship =

The 2020 European Lacrosse Championship will be the 11th edition of the European Lacrosse competition for men's national teams. It will be played in Wrocław, Poland. The championship was initially dated from 23 July to 1 August 2020. However, due to the COVID-19 pandemic, the tournament was postponed to be played from 21 to 31 July 2021.

On 12 March, 2021, the competition was once again postponed, with no future date announced.

The 2020 European Lacrosse Championship was eventually played from April 11 to April 16 of 2022. Ukraine was going to debut in this competition except the Ukrainian and Russian teams did not participate due to the Russo-Ukrainian War. Portugal made its first appearance at the European Lacrosse Championship.

This will be the first European Championship that will serve as qualifier for the next edition of the World Lacrosse Championship.

11 teams earned qualification for the 2023 Men's Championship via results of the European Men's Qualifier

Men's Lacrosse European Qualifiers 2022 individual game results

== Teams ==
The 29 participating national teams were confirmed on 13 December 2019. Teams from Croatia, Luxembourg and Turkey will make their debut in a European Championship after their presence in the 2018 World Lacrosse Championship, while Portugal and Ukraine will play their first international tournament ever.

- Austria
- Belgium
- Croatia
- Czech Republic
- Denmark
- England
- Finland
- France
- Germany
- Hungary
- Ireland
- Israel
- Italy
- Latvia
- Luxembourg
- Netherlands
- Norway
- Poland
- Portugal
- Russia
- Scotland
- Slovakia
- Slovenia
- Spain
- Sweden
- Switzerland
- Turkey
- Ukraine
- Wales

== Draw ==
Draw was held on 4 January 2020 at the Olympic Stadium in Wrocław.

Teams were divided into six pots, with the Blue Division composed by teams already qualified for the next World Championship. Teams from this division will play against each other before the next stage. Groups B to E were composed by teams from pots 1, 4 and 5 while groups F to I, with teams from pots 2, 3 and 5.

Blue Division	Pot 1	Pot 2	Pot 3	Pot 4	Pot 5
England; Germany; Ireland; Israel; Scotland	Finland; Italy; Norway; Wales	Latvia; Netherlands; Slovakia; Switzerland	Austria; Czech Republic; Hungary; Sweden	Belgium; France; Poland; Spain	Croatia; Denmark; Luxembourg; Portugal; Russia; Slovenia; Turkey

== Group stage ==
=== Blue Division ===
Pos	Team	Pld	W	L	GF	GA	GD	(England)	(Israel)	(Germany)	(Scotland)	(Republic of Ireland)
1	England	0	0	0	0	0	0	—				
2	Israel	0	0	0	0	0	0		—			
3	Germany	0	0	0	0	0	0			—		
4	Scotland	0	0	0	0	0	0				—	
5	Ireland	0	0	0	0	0	0					—

=== Group B ===
Pos	Team	Pld	W	L	GF	GA	GD	(Wales)	(Spain)	(Russia)
1	Wales	0	0	0	0	0	0	—		
2	Spain	0	0	0	0	0	0		—	
3	Russia	0	0	0	0	0	0			—

=== Group C ===
Pos	Team	Pld	W	L	GF	GA	GD	(Norway)	(Belgium)	(Croatia)
1	Norway	0	0	0	0	0	0	—		
2	Belgium	0	0	0	0	0	0		—	
3	Croatia	0	0	0	0	0	0			—

=== Group D ===
Pos	Team	Pld	W	L	GF	GA	GD	(Italy)	(Poland)	(Portugal)
1	Italy	0	0	0	0	0	0	—		
2	Poland	0	0	0	0	0	0		—	
3	Portugal	0	0	0	0	0	0			—

=== Group E ===
Pos	Team	Pld	W	L	GF	GA	GD	(Finland)	(France)	(Slovenia)
1	Finland	0	0	0	0	0	0	—		
2	France	0	0	0	0	0	0		—	
3	Slovenia	0	0	0	0	0	0			—

=== Group F ===
Pos	Team	Pld	W	L	GF	GA	GD	(Latvia)	(Hungary)	(Turkey)
1	Latvia	0	0	0	0	0	0	—		
2	Hungary	0	0	0	0	0	0		—	
3	Turkey	0	0	0	0	0	0			—

=== Group G ===
Pos	Team	Pld	W	L	GF	GA	GD	(Slovakia)	(Austria)	(Denmark)
1	Slovakia	0	0	0	0	0	0	—		
2	Austria	0	0	0	0	0	0		—	
3	Denmark	0	0	0	0	0	0			—

=== Group H ===
Pos	Team	Pld	W	L	GF	GA	GD	(Netherlands)	(Sweden)	(Luxembourg)
1	Netherlands	0	0	0	0	0	0	—		
2	Sweden	0	0	0	0	0	0		—	
3	Luxembourg	0	0	0	0	0	0			—

=== Group I ===
Pos	Team	Pld	W	L	GF	GA	GD	(Switzerland)	(Czech Republic)	(Ukraine)
1	Switzerland	0	0	0	0	0	0	—		
2	Czech Republic	0	0	0	0	0	0		—	
3	Ukraine	0	0	0	0	0	0			—
