= Spain men's national lacrosse team =

National sports team

Spain
- Association: Spanish Lacrosse Association
- Confederation: ELF (Europe)
- Head coach: Mike Bartlett

World Championship
- Appearances: 4 (first in 2006)
- Best result: 16th (2010)

European Championship
- Appearances: 3 (first in 2008)
- Best result: 13th (2008)

First international
- Finland 16–11 Spain (13 July 2006; London, Canada)

Biggest win
- Colombia 2–14 Spain (12 July 2014; Denver, United States); Slovenia 2–14 Spain (31 July 2016; Budapest, Hungary)

Biggest defeat
- Spain 0–26 England (10 August 2008; Lahti, Finland)
- Website: spainlacrosse.org

The Spain men's national lacrosse team is governed by the Spanish Lacrosse Association. Since 2006, Spain plays in the World Lacrosse Championship and the European Lacrosse Championships.The team is managed by Head Coach Mike Bartlett of Poynton Lacrosse who took over the role in August 2016.

== Squad ==
The following players were called for the 2016 European Lacrosse Championship

No.	Pos.	Player
0	G	Gary Jurado
32	D	Francisco Benito
17	D	Ion Rodríguez
2	D	Alberto Hoffman
30	D	Darrel Hunter
4	D	Jaime del Pozo
16	D	Harry Doherty
23	M	Diego Jiménez
11	M	Javier Pérez Coca
25	M	Fernando Martínez
19	M	Connor Cinquegrana

No.	Pos.	Player
1	M	Carlos Rodríguez
9	M	Ignacio Farjas
5	M	Íñigo Macías
69	M	Antonio Gavira
47	M	Álvaro Gil
55	A	Javier Domínguez
14	A	Lucas Sanz
8	A	Joseph Casuto
6	A	Juan Larrea
7	A	Daniel de la Casa
10	A	Pol Llorca

== Competitive record ==
=== World Lacrosse Championship ===
Year	Position	Pld	W	L
(Canada) 2006	17th	7	3	4
(England) 2010	16th	6	2	4
(United States) 2014	30th	7	2	5
(Israel) 2018	31st	7	3	4
Total		27	10	17

=== European Lacrosse Championships ===
Year	Position	Pld	W	L
(Finland) 2008	13th	8	4	4
(Netherlands) 2012	17th	9	1	8
(Hungary) 2016	18th	8	3	5
(Poland) 2021	To be determined			
Total		25	8	17

== Head to head against other national teams ==
As of 20 July 2018

Nation	GP	W	L	Pct.	GF	GA	GD
Argentina	1	0	1	.000	12	16	–4
Austria	3	2	1	.667	31	28	+3
Belgium	3	1	2	.333	31	32	–1
Bermuda	1	1	0	1.000	13	9	+4
Colombia	1	1	0	1.000	14	2	+12
Croatia	1	1	0	1.000	12	9	+3
Czech Republic	1	0	1	.000	2	18	–16
Denmark	2	1	1	.500	23	22	+1
England	1	0	1	.000	0	26	–26
Finland	3	0	3	.000	16	55	–39
France	1	0	1	.000	10	11	–1
Hong Kong	2	2	0	1.000	28	22	+6
Hungary	2	0	2	.000	14	22	–8
Ireland	1	0	1	.000	6	18	–12
Israel	1	0	1	.000	1	17	–16
Italy	4	2	2	.500	39	30	+9
Latvia	3	0	3	.000	21	42	–21
Mexico	1	0	1	.000	10	14	–4
Norway	3	2	1	.667	24	17	+7
Netherlands	1	0	1	.000	1	16	–15
New Zealand	2	0	2	.000	10	32	–22
Poland	2	1	1	.500	20	19	+1
Russia	2	1	1	.500	15	16	–1
Scotland	1	0	1	.000	2	16	–14
Slovenia	1	1	0	1.000	14	2	+12
South Korea	1	1	0	1.000	12	8	+4
Sweden	1	0	1	.000	8	12	–4
Switzerland	3	1	2	.333	14	31	–17
Thailand	1	0	1	.000	6	12	–6
Wales	2	0	2	.000	11	38	–27
Total	52	18	34	.346	420	612	–192

== Official matches ==
=== 2006 World Lacrosse Championship ===
13 July 2006 Yellow Division	Finland	16–11	Spain	London, Canada
		Report

14 July 2006 Yellow Division	Denmark	15–11	Spain	London, Canada
		Report

15 July 2006 Yellow Division	Latvia	11–9	Spain	London, Canada
		Report

16 July 2006 Yellow Division	Spain	13–9	Bermuda	London, Canada
		Report

19 July 2006 Position playoffs	Wales	17–9	Spain	London, Canada
		Report

20 July 2006 Position playoffs	Spain	12–8	Hong Kong	London, Canada
		Report

21 July 2006 17th position game	Spain	12–8	South Korea	London, Canada
		Report

=== 2008 European Lacrosse Championships ===
7 August 2008 Group A	Latvia	10–9	Spain	Lahti, Finland

8 August 2008 Group A	Switzerland	6–10	Spain	Lahti, Finland

9 August 2008 Group A	Wales	21–2	Spain	Lahti, Finland

10 August 2008 Group A	Spain	0–26	England	Lahti, Finland

11 August 2008 Group A	Spain	6–18	Ireland	Lahti, Finland

13 August 2008 Group H	Spain	11–8	Austria	Lahti, Finland

14 August 2008 Group H	Italy	4–14	Spain	Lahti, Finland

15 August 2008 13th position game	Spain	10–0	Norway	Lahti, Finland

=== 2010 World Lacrosse Championship ===
17 July 2010 Plum Division	Norway	8–11	Spain	Manchester, England
		Report

18 July 2010 Plum Division	Spain	16–14	Hong Kong	Manchester, England
		Report

19 July 2010 Intermediate round	Netherlands	16–1	Spain	Manchester, England
		Report

20 July 2010 Intermediate round	Finland	21–4	Spain	Manchester, England
		Report

22 July 2010 13th–16th bracket	Spain	11–15	Poland	Manchester, England
		Report

23 July 2010 15th position game	Spain	5–23	New Zealand	Manchester, England
		Report

=== 2012 European Lacrosse Championships ===
21 June 2012 Purple Group	Spain	6–12	Italy	Amsterdam, Netherlands
		Report

22 June 2012 Purple Group	Czech Republic	18–2	Spain	Amsterdam, Netherlands
		Report

23 June 2012 Purple Group	Scotland	16–2	Spain	Amsterdam, Netherlands
		Report

24 June 2012 Purple Group	Spain	0–13	Switzerland	Amsterdam, Netherlands
		Report

25 June 2012 Purple Group	Spain	9–7	Belgium	Amsterdam, Netherlands
		Report

27 June 2012 13th–17th group	Spain	5–7	Italy	Amsterdam, Netherlands
		Report

28 June 2012 13th–17th group	France	11–10	Spain	Amsterdam, Netherlands
		Report

29 June 2012 13th–17th group	Spain	11–13	Belgium	Amsterdam, Netherlands
		Report

30 June 2012 13th–17th group	Norway	9–3	Spain	Amsterdam, Netherlands
		Report

=== 2014 World Lacrosse Championship ===
11 July 2014 Turquoise Division	Spain	10–14	Mexico	Denver, United States
		Report

12 July 2014 Turquoise Division	Colombia	2–14	Spain	Denver, United States
		Report

13 July 2014 Turquoise Division	Finland	18–1	Spain	Denver, United States
		Report

14 July 2014 Play-in stage	Spain	3–21	Latvia	Denver, United States
		Report

15 July 2014 Play-in stage	Spain	6–11	Russia	Denver, United States
		Report

17 July 2014 29th–32nd place	Spain	9–5	Russia	Denver, United States
		Report

18 July 2014 29th position game	Spain	6–12	Thailand	Denver, United States
		Report

=== 2016 European Lacrosse Championship ===
29 July 2016 Group C	Israel	17–1	Spain	Budapest, Hungary
10:15		Report

30 July 2016 Group C	Spain	11–12	Belgium	Budapest, Hungary
11:30		Report

31 July 2016 Group C	Slovenia	2–14	Spain	Budapest, Hungary
10:15		Report

1 August 2016 Group C	Spain	8–12	Sweden	Budapest, Hungary
14:45		Report

2 August 2016 Group C	Switzerland	4–12	Spain	Budapest, Hungary
10:00		Report

4 August 2016 17th–24th position	Spain	14–7	Italy	Budapest, Hungary
8:45		Report

5 August 2016 17th–20th position	Austria	8–10	Spain	Budapest, Hungary
10:15		Report

6 August 2016 17th position game	Hungary	13–6	Spain	Budapest, Hungary
8:30		Report

=== 2018 World Lacrosse Championship ===
12 July 2018 Plum Division	New Zealand	9–5	Spain	Netanya, Israel
9:15		Report

13 July 2018 Plum Division	Spain	12–9	Croatia	Netanya, Israel
14:45		Report

15 July 2018 Play-in game 1	Austria	12–10	Spain	Netanya, Israel
21:15		Report

17 July 2018 Play-in game 2	Spain	12–7	Denmark	Netanya, Israel
13:15		Report

18 July 2018 25th–32nd position	Hungary	9–8	Spain	Netanya, Israel
15:30		Report

19 July 2018 29th–32nd position	Argentina	16–12	Spain	Netanya, Israel
10:30		Report

20 July 2018 31st position game	Poland	4–9	Spain	Netanya, Israel
10:30		Report

== Top goalscorers ==
This list includes all official games except the 2008 European Championship, as there are not any available stats.

Pos.	Player	Goals
1	Daniel de la Casa	126
2	Connor Cinquegrana	34
3	Luis González	23
4	Lorenzo Timón	19
5	Ignacio Farjas	17
6	Nicolás González	16
7	Josep Casuto	13
8	Desiderio González	12
9	Diego Larraz	10
10	Ion Rodríguez	9

== See also ==
- Spain women's national lacrosse team
- Lacrosse in Spain
