= European Box Lacrosse Championships =

Sports championship

European Box Lacrosse Championship
- Sport: Box lacrosse
- Founded: 2017
- No. of teams: 18 men's, 8 women's teams
- Countries: Austria Belgium; Czech Republic; England; Finland; Germany; Ireland; Netherlands; Poland; Scotland; Serbia; Slovakia; Sweden; Switzerland; Portugal; Norway; Italy France
- Most recent champion: Ireland (1st title)
- Most titles: England (1 title); Israel (1 title)
- Website: Official website
- 2026 European Box Lacrosse Championship

The European Box Lacrosse Championship (EBLC) is the box lacrosse championship organized by the Federation of International Lacrosse (FIL) and European Lacrosse Federation (ELF) that occurs every four years.

The most recent European Championships where held in Prague, Czechia between June 25 – July 4, 2026 with the first ever women's box lacrosse championship also being held there!

The EBLC had its first championship event in Turku, Finland between July 8 – 15, 2017 and had 14 participating nations, competing for the EBLC 2017 Gold medal at two arenas – Gatorade Center and the Marlie Areena.

Due to the COVID-19 pandemic, the EBLC 2021 was delayed to the following year. It was held between July 30 – August 6, 2022 in Hanover, Germany.

== Editions ==
=== 2017 EBLC Championship ===
Logo of the European Box Lacrosse Championship 2017 in Turku

14 teams competed for the first ever European Box Lacrosse Championships in Turku. Teams were divided into three groups, two of them being top groups based on current ranking, Karelia and Kalevala, with Granite group filled with the lower ranked teams.

==== Kalevala Group ====
Israel, Ireland, Turkey, Serbia.

==== Karelia Group ====
England, Czech Republic, Finland, Germany.

==== Granite Group ====
Sweden, Poland, Switzerland, Netherlands, Austria, Slovakia.

Israel defeated the Czech Republic 8–7 in the gold medal game of the 2017 European Box Lacrosse Championship in Turku, Finland. John-Luc Chetner of Israel was named tournament MVP.

=== 2022 EBLC Championship ===
Logo of the European Box Lacrosse Championship 2022 in Hanover

14 teams competed for the second European Box Lacrosse Championships in Hanover. Teams were divided into four groups and played in two arenas, at the DHC Hannover e.V. and in the huus de groot – EISARENA Mellendorf.

==== Group A ====
Belgium, Finland, Serbia, Sweden.

==== Group B ====
Czech Republic, Germany, Poland, Slovakia.

==== Group C ====
Austria, Netherlands, Switzerland.

==== Group D ====
England, Ireland, Scotland.

=== 2026 EBLC Championship ===
For the men 18 teams competed for the third European Box Lacrosse Championships in Prague. The women had 7 teams compete. Both played in three arenas, at LCC Radotín, Sportovní hala Jižní Město and TJ Malešice

== Awards ==
=== 2017 ===
- Top Scorer: John-Luc Chetner, Israel
- Defensive MVP: Michael Shea, Ireland

== Winners ==
Year	Host	Champion	Score	Runner-up	Third place	Score	Fourth place	Number of teams
2017	Turku, Finland	Israel	8–7	Czech Republic	Finland	11–6	Germany	14
2022	Hanover, Germany	England	11–8	Germany	Czech Republic	15–9	Finland	14
2026	Prague, Czech Republic	Ireland	9–6	Finland	Germany	17–9	England	18

== Performance by team ==
=== Medal table ===
Rank	Nation	Gold	Silver	Bronze	Total
1	England	1	0	0	1
1	Ireland	1	0	0	1
1	Israel	1	0	0	1
4	Czech Republic	0	1	1	2
4	Finland	0	1	1	2
4	Germany	0	1	1	2
Totals (6 entries)		3	3	3	9

=== Performance by tournament ===
Team	2017 (Finland) (14)	2022 (Germany) (14)	2026 (Czech Republic) (18)
Austria	13th	10th	14th
Belgium	—	13th	9th
Czech Republic	2nd	3rd	5th
England	5th	1st	4th
Finland	3rd	4th	2nd
France	—	—	18th
Germany	4th	2nd	3rd
Ireland	6th	9th	1st
Italy	—	—	8th
Israel	1st	—	7th
Netherlands	14th	11th	11th
Norway	—	—	10th
Poland	11th	12th	6th
Portugal	—	—	17th
Scotland	—	7th	13th
Serbia	8th	14th	—
Slovakia	7th	5th	15th
Sweden	10th	8th	—
Switzerland	9th	6th	12th
Turkey	12th	—	—
Wales	—	—	16th

== See also ==
- Box lacrosse
- Federation of International Lacrosse
- Under-19 World Lacrosse Championships (men and women)
- Women's Lacrosse World Cup
- World Indoor Lacrosse Championship (men)
- World Junior Lacrosse Championship (men)
