= 2018 World Lacrosse Championship =

International men's field lacrosse championship

Tournament details
- Host country: Israel
- Venue(s): Netanya Stadium; Wingate Institute
- Dates: 12–21 July
- Teams: 46

Final positions
- Champions: United States (10th title)
- Runners-up: Canada
- Third place: Haudenosaunee
- Fourth place: Australia

Tournament statistics
- Games played: 170

Awards
- MVP: (United States) Michael Ehrhardt

The 2018 World Lacrosse Championship was the 13th edition of the international men's field lacrosse tournament for national teams organized by the Federation of International Lacrosse (FIL). Forty-six team competed, the largest number ever, as of 2026. The games were held in Netanya, Israel, on 12–21 July 2018. The United States won the tournament, its 10th championship in the history of the event.

== Hosting ==
Manchester, England was originally selected to host the tournament, but withdrew in May 2017. Instead, the championships took place in Netanya, Israel between 12 and 21 July 2018. This was the first World Lacrosse Championship played outside of the United States, Canada, England, or Australia.

== Tournament ==
On Thursday, 12 July, the Opening Ceremony and first games were held at Netanya Stadium, a 13,610-seat multi-use stadium which opened in 2012. It served as a host venue for the 2013 UEFA European Under-21 Championship and is the home field of Maccabi Netanya FC.

From Friday, 13 July to Saturday, 21 July, tournament games were played at Wingate Institute. Located on 50 hectares (125 acres), the Wingate Institute serves as Israel's National Centre for Physical Education and Sport. The campus's facilities host the Maccabiah Games every four years, and its primary stadium serves as the home field for the Israel National Rugby Team.

=== Participating nations ===
48 teams initially entered the tournament. They were drawn into 14 groups in March 2018. Bulgaria and Haiti later withdrew, leaving 46 teams. The world ranking of the teams based on their performance in the 2014 edition is also displayed. The top 6 teams in the 2014 edition are drawn into the Blue Division while the rest of the teams were drawn into the other divisions.

Blue Division	Other divisions
Canada (1); United States (2); Haudenosaunee (3); Australia (4); England (5); Scotland (6)	Israel (7); Japan (8); Germany (9); Ireland (10); Sweden (11); New Zealand (12); Finland (13); Czech Republic (14); Switzerland (15); Netherlands (16); Wales (17); Italy (18); Latvia (19); Poland (20); Hong Kong (21); Turkey (22); Mexico (23); Bermuda (24); Norway (25); Slovakia (26); Belgium (27); Austria (28); Spain (29); Russia (30); China (31); Uganda (32); South Korea (33); Argentina (34); Colombia (35); France (37); Croatia (–); Denmark (–); Greece (–); Hungary (–); Jamaica (–); Luxembourg (–); Peru (–); Philippines (–); Puerto Rico (–); Chinese Taipei (–)
Withdrew	Participated in 2014 but not in 2018
Bulgaria (–); Haiti (–)	Costa Rica (36); Thailand (38)

=== Schedule ===
- Wednesday, 11 July – Opening game (Hong Kong vs. Luxembourg)
- Thursday, 12 July – Opening ceremony and pool play
- Friday, 13 July to Tuesday, 17 July – pool play and play-Ins
- Wednesday, 18 July – Quarterfinals
- Thursday, 19 July – Semifinals
- Friday, 20 July – Final placement games (bronze-medal game to 46th place)
- Saturday, 21 July – Gold-medal game

== Pool play ==
=== Blue Division ===
Pos	Team	Pld	W	L	GF	GA	GD	Qualification	(United States)	(Canada)	(Haudenosaunee)	(Australia)	(England)	(Scotland)
1	United States	5	5	0	84	24	+60	Advance to semifinals	—	11–10	17–9	19–1	19–2	18–2
2	Canada	5	4	1	67	32	+35	Advance to semifinals	10–11	—	10–5	13–7	12–6	22–3
3	Haudenosaunee	5	3	2	62	50	+12	Advance to quarterfinals	9–17	5–10	—	16–9	18–7	14–7
4	Australia	5	2	3	42	60	−18	Advance to quarterfinals	1–19	7–13	9–16	—	7–6	18–6
5	England	5	1	4	32	64	−32	Advance to play-in games	2–19	6–12	7–18	6–7	—	11–8
6	Scotland	5	0	5	26	83	−57	Advance to play-in games	2–18	3–22	7–14	6–18	8–11	—

Source: 2018 World Lacrosse Championship

=== Red Division ===
Pos	Team	Pld	W	L	GF	GA	GD	Qualification	(Israel)	(Jamaica)	(Russia)
1	Israel	2	2	0	30	5	+25	Advance to upper bracket	—	11–3	19–2
2	Jamaica	2	1	1	20	18	+2	Advance to middle bracket	3–11	—	17–7
3	Russia	2	0	2	9	36	−27	Advance to lower bracket	2–19	7–17	—

Source: 2018 World Lacrosse Championship

=== White Division ===
Pos	Team	Pld	W	L	GF	GA	GD	Qualification	(Japan)	(Norway)	(Netherlands)
1	Japan	2	2	0	32	6	+26	Advance to upper bracket	—	14–3	18–3
2	Norway	2	1	1	17	30	−13	Advance to upper bracket	3–14	—	14–6
3	Netherlands	2	0	2	9	32	−23	Advance to middle bracket	3–18	6–14	—

Source: 2018 World Lacrosse Championship

=== Green Division ===
Pos	Team	Pld	W	L	GF	GA	GD	Qualification	(Germany)	(France)	(South Korea)
1	Germany	2	2	0	34	9	+25	Advance to upper bracket	—	15–4	19–5
2	France	2	1	1	14	21	−7	Advance to middle bracket	4–15	—	10–6
3	South Korea	2	0	2	11	29	−18	Advance to lower bracket	5–19	6–10	—

Source: 2018 World Lacrosse Championship

=== Yellow Division ===
Pos	Team	Pld	W	L	GF	GA	GD	Qualification	(Republic of Ireland)	(Denmark)	(China)
1	Ireland	2	2	0	32	6	+26	Advance to upper bracket	—	14–3	18–3
2	Denmark	2	1	1	17	18	−1	Advance to middle bracket	3–14	—	14–4
3	China	2	0	2	7	32	−25	Advance to lower bracket	3–18	4–14	—

Source: 2018 World Lacrosse Championship

=== Orange Division ===
Pos	Team	Pld	W	L	GF	GA	GD	Qualification	(Sweden)	(Argentina)	(Hungary)
1	Sweden	2	2	0	29	11	+18	Advance to upper bracket	—	13–5	16–6
2	Argentina	2	1	1	19	19	0	Advance to middle bracket	5–13	—	14–6
3	Hungary	2	0	2	12	30	−18	Advance to lower bracket	6–16	6–14	—

Source: 2018 World Lacrosse Championship

=== Plum Division ===
Pos	Team	Pld	W	L	GF	GA	GD	Qualification	(New Zealand)	(Spain)	(Croatia)
1	New Zealand	2	2	0	25	7	+18	Advance to upper bracket	—	9–5	16–2
2	Spain	2	1	1	17	18	−1	Advance to middle bracket	5–9	—	12–9
3	Croatia	2	0	2	11	28	−17	Advance to lower bracket	2–16	9–12	—

Source: 2018 World Lacrosse Championship

=== Turquoise Division ===
Pos	Team	Pld	W	L	GF	GA	GD	Qualification	(Finland)	(Austria)	(Colombia)
1	Finland	2	2	0	31	11	+20	Advance to upper bracket	—	11–7	20–4
2	Austria	2	1	1	20	18	+2	Advance to middle bracket	7–11	—	13–7
3	Colombia	2	0	2	11	33	−22	Advance to lower bracket	4–20	7–13	—

Source: 2018 World Lacrosse Championship

=== Grey Division ===
Pos	Team	Pld	W	L	GF	GA	GD	Qualification	(Philippines)	(Czech Republic)	(Belgium)
1	Philippines	2	2	0	22	10	+12	Advance to upper bracket	—	11–6	11–4
2	Czech Republic	2	1	1	21	19	+2	Advance to middle bracket	6–11	—	15–8
3	Belgium	2	0	2	12	26	−14	Advance to lower bracket	4–11	8–15	—

Source: 2018 World Lacrosse Championship

=== Gold Division ===
Pos	Team	Pld	W	L	GF	GA	GD	Qualification	(Switzerland)	(Slovakia)	(Chinese Taipei)
1	Switzerland	2	2	0	27	7	+20	Advance to upper bracket	—	10–6	17–1
2	Slovakia	2	1	1	19	11	+8	Advance to middle bracket	6–10	—	13–1
3	Chinese Taipei	2	0	2	2	30	−28	Advance to lower bracket	1–17	1–13	—

Source: 2018 World Lacrosse Championship

=== Bronze Division ===
Pos	Team	Pld	W	L	GF	GA	GD	Qualification	(Puerto Rico)	(Wales)	(Bermuda)
1	Puerto Rico	2	2	0	34	7	+27	Advance to upper bracket	—	16–4	18–3
2	Wales	2	1	1	12	20	−8	Advance to middle bracket	4–16	—	8–4
3	Bermuda	2	0	2	7	26	−19	Advance to lower bracket	3–18	4–8	—

Source: 2018 World Lacrosse Championship

=== Tan Division ===
Pos	Team	Pld	W	L	GF	GA	GD	Qualification	(Italy)	(Peru)	(Turkey)
1	Italy	2	2	0	29	15	+14	Advance to upper bracket	—	13–7	16–8
2	Peru	2	1	1	25	24	+1	Advance to middle bracket	7–13	—	18–11
3	Turkey	2	0	2	19	34	−15	Advance to lower bracket	8–16	11–18	—

Source: 2018 World Lacrosse Championship

=== Purple Division ===
Pos	Team	Pld	W	L	GF	GA	GD	Qualification	(Latvia)	(Greece)	(Mexico)
1	Latvia	2	2	0	23	19	+4	Advance to upper bracket	—	10-9	13–10
2	Greece	2	1	1	22	18	+4	Advance to middle bracket	9–10	—	13–8
3	Mexico	2	0	2	18	26	−8	Advance to lower bracket	10–13	8–13	—

Source: 2018 World Lacrosse Championship

=== Olive Division ===
Pos	Team	Pld	W	L	GF	GA	GD	Qualification	(Hong Kong)	(Poland)	(Uganda)	(Luxembourg)
1	Hong Kong	3	3	0	45	9	+36	Advance to upper bracket	—	9–7	16–1	20–1
2	Poland	3	2	1	38	19	+19	Advance to middle bracket	7–9	—	16–4	15–6
3	Uganda	3	1	2	12	38	−26	Advance to middle bracket	1–16	4–16	—	7–6
4	Luxembourg	3	0	3	13	42	−29	Advance to lower bracket	1–20	6–15	6–7	—

Source: 2018 World Lacrosse Championship

== Play-in games ==
=== Upper bracket ===
The upper bracket includes the 13 first-place finishers from each division as well as the second-place finisher of the white division. These teams can still win the world championship.

Team 1	Score	Team 2
First round
Finland	11–9	Norway
Germany	12–4	Hong Kong
New Zealand	1–13	Puerto Rico
Philippines	11–5	Switzerland
Sweden	11–13	Italy
Ireland	12–7	Latvia
Second round
Ireland	15–7	Italy
Israel	11–8	Philippines
Japan	15–5	Finland
Germany	9–14	Puerto Rico
Latvia	13–9	Sweden
New Zealand	11–9	Hong Kong
Third round
Israel	16–4	Ireland
Japan	8–14	Puerto Rico
Italy	11–12	Philippines
Latvia	9–8	Norway
Finland	7–12	Germany
Switzerland	9–6	New Zealand

Nation	Qualification	
Nation	Play-in	Final placement round
Israel; Puerto Rico	1st to 8th place	Relegated to 5th to 8th place
Japan; England	5th to 12th place	Advanced to 5th to 8th place
Ireland; Scotland	5th to 12th place	Relegated to 9th to 12th place
Germany; Philippines	9th to 16th place	Advanced to 9th to 12th place
Finland; Italy	9th to 16th place	Relegated to 13th to 16th place
Latvia; Switzerland	13th to 20th place	Relegated to 17th to 20th place

First round
GY1	Philippines	11
GD1	Switzerland	5
OR1	Sweden	11
TN1	Italy	13
YL1	Ireland	12
PR1	Latvia	7

Second round
RD1	Israel	11
GY1	Philippines	8
YL1	Ireland	15
TN1	Italy	7

Third round
RD1	Israel	16
YL1	Ireland	4

Second round			Third round
RD1	Israel	11
GY1	Philippines	8
GY1	Philippines	8	TN1	Italy	11
			GY1	Philippines	12

Second round			Third round
PR1	Latvia	13
OR1	Sweden	9
OR1	Sweden	9	WH2	Norway	8
			PR1	Latvia	9

First round
TQ1	Finland	11
WH2	Norway	9
GR1	Germany	12
OV1	Hong Kong	4
PL1	New Zealand	1
BZ1	Puerto Rico	13

Second round
WH1	Japan	15
TQ1	Finland	5
GR1	Germany	9
BZ1	Puerto Rico	14

Third round
WH1	Japan	8
BZ1	Puerto Rico	14

Second round			Third round
WH1	Japan	15
TQ1	Finland	5
TQ1	Finland	5	TQ1	Finland	7
			GR1	Germany	12

Second round			Third round
PL1	New Zealand	11
OV1	Hong Kong	9
OV1	Hong Kong	9	GD1	Switzerland	9
			PL1	New Zealand	6

=== Middle bracket ===
Team 1	Score	Team 2
First round
Peru	4–17	Jamaica
Netherlands	13–6	France
Wales	17–1	Uganda
Slovakia	8–5	Denmark
Czech Republic	8–12	Argentina
Austria	12–10	Spain
Second round
Wales	9–5	Netherlands
Jamaica	12–5	Slovakia
Poland	8–12	Austria
Greece	12–9	Argentina
Uganda	5–14	France
Denmark	11–4	Peru
Third round
Greece	4-11	Jamaica
Austria	5–9	Wales
Argentina	9-10	Slovakia
Spain	12–7	Denmark
Netherlands	9–7	Poland
France	7–14	Czech Republic

Nation	Qualification	
Nation	Play-in/s	Final placement round
Wales; Jamaica	13th to 20th place	Advance to 13th to 16th place
Norway; Greece	17th to 24th place	Advance to 17th to 20th
Austria; New Zealand	17th to 24th place	Relegated to 21st to 24th
Netherlands; Slovakia	21st to 32nd place	Advance to 21st to 24th place
Argentina; Poland (#1)	21st to 32nd place (first play-in)	Two play-in matches
Hong Kong; Czech Republic; Sweden; Hungary	25th to 32nd place	Advance to 25th to 28th place
Belgium; Spain	25th to 32nd place	Relegated to 29th to 32nd place
Argentina; Poland (#2)	25th to 28th place (second play-in)	Relegated to 29th to 32nd place
Peru; Uganda	33rd to 40th place	Relegated to 37th to 40th place

First round
GY2	Czech Republic	8
OR2	Argentina	12
TN2	Peru	4
RD2	Jamaica	17
GD2	Slovakia	8
YL2	Denmark	5

Second round
PR2	Greece	12
OR2	Argentina	9
RD2	Jamaica	12
GD2	Slovakia	5

Third round
PR2	Greece	4
RD2	Jamaica	11

Second round			Third round
PR2	Greece	12
OR2	Argentina	9
OR2	Argentina	9	OR2	Argentina	9
			GD2	Slovakia	10

Second round			Third round
YL2	Denmark	11
TN2	Peru	4
TN2	Peru	4	PL2	Spain	12
			YL2	Denmark	7

First round
TQ2	Austria	12
PL2	Spain	10
BZ2	Wales	17
OV3	Uganda	1
WH3	Netherlands	13
GR2	France	6

Second round
OV2	Poland	8
TQ2	Austria	12
BZ2	Wales	9
WH3	Netherlands	5

Third round
TQ2	Austria	5
BZ2	Wales	9

Second round			Third round
OV2	Poland	8
TQ2	Austria	12
TQ2	Austria	12	WH3	Netherlands	9
			OV2	Poland	7

Second round			Third round
OV3	Uganda	5
GR2	France	14
GR2	France	14	GY2	Czech Republic	14
			GR2	France	7

=== Lower bracket ===
Team 1	Score	Team 2
First round
Russia	24–1	Luxembourg
China	12–13	Turkey
South Korea	9–6	Mexico
Colombia	6–7	Belgium
Hungary	7–6	Bermuda
Croatia	7–6	Chinese Taipei
Second round
Turkey	8–11	Belgium
Hungary	15–3	Croatia
Bermuda	17–2	Luxembourg
Mexico	15–14	China
Third round
Russia	12–14	Hungary
Belgium	17–8	South Korea
Chinese Taipei	3–10	Bermuda
Colombia	10–22	Mexico

Nation	Qualification	
Nation	Play-in	Final placement round
South Korea; Russia	33rd to 40th place	Advance to 33rd to 36th place
Bermuda; Mexico	37th to 44th place	Advance to 37th to 40th place
Croatia; Turkey	37th to 44th place	Relegated to 41st to 44th place
Chinese Taipei; China	41st to 46th place	Advance to 41st to 44th place
Luxembourg; Colombia	41st to 46th place	Relegated to 45th to 46th

First round
RD3	Russia	24
OV4	Luxembourg	1
OR3	Hungary	7
BZ3	Bermuda	6
PL3	Croatia	7
GD3	Chinese Taipei	6

Second round
RD3	Russia
N/A	bye
OR3	Hungary	15
PL3	Croatia	3

Third round
RD3	Russia	12
OR3	Hungary	14

Second round			Third round
BZ3	Bermuda	17
OV4	Luxembourg	2
OV4	Luxembourg	2	GD3	Chinese Taipei	3
			BZ3	Bermuda	10

First round
GR3	South Korea	9
PR3	Mexico	6
YL3	China	12
TN3	Turkey	13
TQ3	Colombia	6
GY3	Belgium	7

Second round
GR3	South Korea
N/A	bye
TN3	Turkey	8
GY3	Belgium	11

Third round
GR3	South Korea	8
GY3	Belgium	17

Second round			Third round
PR3	Mexico	15
YL3	China	14
YL3	China	14	TQ3	Colombia	10
			PR3	Mexico	22

== Final placement round ==
=== Championship bracket ===
==== 1st to 4th place ====
Quarterfinals; 18 July
Israel	6
Australia	9
Puerto Rico	7
Haudenosaunee	14

Semifinals; 19 July
United States	14
Australia	5
Canada	15
Haudenosaunee	4

Gold medal game 21 July
United States	9
Canada	8
Bronze medal game 20 July
Australia	12
Haudenosaunee	14

=== Classification brackets ===
==== 5th to 8th place ====
Play-in games 18 July
Japan	11
Scotland	7
Ireland	10
England	11

5th to 8th place games 19 July
Israel	9
Japan	10
Puerto Rico	4
England	11

5th place game 20 July
Japan	9
England	11
7th place game
Israel	12
Puerto Rico	1

==== 9th to 12th place ====
Play-in games 17 July
Finland	7
Germany	12
Italy	11
Philippines	12

9th to 12th place games 19 July
Ireland	5
Germany	14
Scotland	6
Philippines	12

9th place game 20 July
Germany	8
Philippines	5
11th place game
Ireland	10
Scotland	14

==== 13th to 16th place ====
Play-in games 18 July
Wales	10
Latvia	9
Jamaica	12
Switzerland	6

13th to 16th place games 19 July
Italy	4
Wales	15
Finland	7
Jamaica	8

13th place game 20 July
Wales	7
Jamaica	10
15th place game
Italy	3
Finland	16

==== 17th to 20th place ====
Play-in games 18 July
Norway	16
Austria	5
Greece	12
New Zealand	11

17th to 20th place games 19 July
Switzerland	5
Norway	7
Latvia	14
Greece	9

17th place game 20 July
Norway	10
Latvia	9
19th place game
Switzerland	6
Greece	8

==== 21st to 24th place ====
Play-in games 17 July
Netherlands	9
Poland	7
Argentina	9
Slovakia	10

21st to 24th place games 19 July
Austria	7
Netherlands	10
New Zealand	10
Slovakia	9

21st place game 20 July
Netherlands	6
New Zealand	10
23rd-place game
Austria	9
Slovakia	11

==== 25th to 28th place ====
Play-in games 18 July
Hong Kong	16
Poland	5
Czech Republic	10
Belgium	8
Argentina	4
Sweden	11
Hungary	9
Spain	8

25th to 28th place games 19 July
Hong Kong	8
Czech Republic	9
Sweden	14
Hungary	8

25th place game 20 July
Czech Republic	7
Sweden	9
27th place game
Hong Kong	15
Hungary	5

==== 29th to 32nd place ====
29th to 32nd place games 19 July
Poland	11
Belgium	12
Argentina	16
Spain	12

29th place game 20 July
Belgium	8
Argentina	12
31st place game
Poland	4
Spain	9

==== 33rd to 36th place ====
Play-in games 18 July
Uganda	4
South Korea	12
Russia	18
Peru	9

33rd to 36th place games 19 July
Denmark	11
South Korea	7
France	17
Russia	8

33rd-place game 20 July
Denmark	7
France	13
35th place game
South Korea	12
Russia	7

==== 37th to 40th place ====
Play-in games 18 July
Croatia	1
Bermuda	10
Turkey	8
Mexico	14

37th to 40th place games 19 July
Peru	3
Bermuda	12
Uganda	3
Mexico	19

37th place game 20 July
Bermuda	9
Mexico	6
39th place game
Peru	11
Uganda	10

==== 41st to 44th place ====
Play-in games 18 July
Luxembourg	4
Chinese Taipei	12
China	14
Colombia	6

41st to 44th place games 19 July
Turkey	9
Chinese Taipei	15
Croatia	10
China	15

41st place game 20 July
Chinese Taipei	8
China	7
43rd-place game
Turkey	8
Croatia	15

==== 45th to 46th place ====
45th place game 20 July
Luxembourg	10
Colombia	13

== 2018 World Lacrosse Festival ==
Alongside the WLC, youth and adult lacrosse teams from around the world will participate in the 2018 World Lacrosse Festival at Shefayim Soccer Complex.

== Final standings ==
Rank	Team	Div	Pld	W	L	GF	GA	GD
1st place, gold medalist(s)	United States	1	7	7	0	107	37	+70
2nd place, silver medalist(s)	Canada	2	7	5	2	90	45	+45
3rd place, bronze medalist(s)	Haudenosaunee	3	8	5	3	94	84	+10
4	Australia	4	8	3	5	68	94	-26
5	England	5	8	4	4	65	87	-22
6	Japan	1	7	5	2	96	52	+44
7	Israel	1	7	5	2	84	37	+47
8	Puerto Rico	1	8	5	3	87	63	+24
9	Germany	1	7	6	1	89	44	+45
10	Philippines	1	7	5	2	70	51	+19
11	Scotland	6	8	1	7	53	116	-63
12	Ireland	1	8	4	4	88	75	+13
13	Jamaica	2	8	7	1	90	51	+39
14	Wales	2	8	6	2	79	54	+25
15	Finland	1	7	4	3	77	58	+19
16	Italy	1						
17	Norway	2						
18	Latvia	1						
19	Greece	2						
20	Switzerland	1						
21	New Zealand	1						
22	Netherlands	3						
23	Slovakia	2						
24	Austria	2						
25	Sweden	1						
26	Czech Republic	2						
27	Hong Kong	1	8	5	3	97	51	+46
28	Hungary	3						
29	Argentina	2						
30	Belgium	3						
31	Spain	2						
32	Poland	2						
33	France	2						
34	Denmark	2						
35	South Korea	3						
36	Russia	3	7	2	5	78	89	-11
37	Bermuda	3	8	5	3	75	49	+26
38	Mexico	3						
39	Peru	2						
40	Uganda	3	8	1	7	35	111	-76
41	Chinese Taipei	3						
42	China	3						
43	Croatia	3	7	2	5	47	82	-35
44	Turkey	3						
45	Colombia	3	6	1	5	46	86	-40
46	Luxembourg	4	7	0	7	30	98	-68

Legend
Blue Division
Red Division
White Division
Green Division
Yellow Division
Orange Division
Plum Division
Turquoise Division
Grey Division
Gold Division
Bronze Division
Tan Division
Purple Division
Olive Division

== Awards ==
The following awards were given out at the end of the tournament.

MVP: (United States) Michael Ehrhardt
Outstanding Attackman: (Canada) Curtis Dickson
Outstanding Midfielder: (United States) Tom Schreiber
Outstanding Defenseman: (United States) Michael Ehrhardt
Outstanding Goalie: (Canada) Dillon Ward

=== All-World Team ===
Attack	Midfield	Defense	Goalkeeper
(United States) Rob Pannell (United States) Ryan Brown (Canada) Curtis Dickson	(United States) Tom Schreiber (Haudenosaunee) Austin Staats (Canada) Ben McIntosh	(United States) Michael Ehrhardt (Canada) Graeme Hossack (Canada) Ryland Rees	(Canada) Dillon Ward
