= European Lacrosse Championships =

European lacrosse championship tournament

The European Lacrosse Championships began in 1995, the same year as the founding of the European Lacrosse Federation (ELF), to determine the best national lacrosse team of Europe. The men's tournament was held that first year, with the women following in 1996. Through 2001, the Championships were annual events. Since 2004 the men's tournament has been held every four years. The women have played in 2003, 2004, 2008, 2012 and 2015.

== Medals ==
=== Men ===
Rank	Nation	Gold	Silver	Bronze	Total
1	England	9	1	1	11
2	Germany	1	3	1	5
3	Israel	1	1	0	2
4	Czech Republic	0	3	1	4
5	Ireland	0	1	0	1
5	Italy	0	1	0	1
5	Netherlands	0	1	0	1
8	Scotland	0	0	4	4
9	Finland	0	0	2	2
10	Sweden	0	0	1	1
10	Wales	0	0	1	1
Totals (11 entries)		11	11	11	33

=== Women ===
Rank	Nation	Gold	Silver	Bronze	Total
1	England	8	3	1	12
2	Wales	3	5	2	10
3	Scotland	1	2	6	9
4	Israel	0	2	0	2
5	Czech Republic	0	0	3	3
Totals (5 entries)		12	12	12	36

=== Total ===
Rank	Nation	Gold	Silver	Bronze	Total
1	England	17	4	2	23
2	Wales	3	5	3	11
3	Germany	1	3	1	5
4	Israel	1	3	0	4
5	Scotland	1	2	10	13
6	Czech Republic	0	3	4	7
7	Ireland	0	1	0	1
7	Italy	0	1	0	1
7	Netherlands	0	1	0	1
10	Finland	0	0	2	2
11	Sweden	0	0	1	1
Totals (11 entries)		23	23	23	69

== Results ==
=== Men ===
#	Year	Host	Final			Third place match		
#	Year	Host	Champions	Score	Runners-up	Third place	Score	Fourth place
1	1995	(Czech Republic); Prague	England	8–6	Czech Republic	Wales	12–4	Scotland
2	1996	(Germany); Düsseldorf	England	8–6	Czech Republic	Scotland		Wales
3	1997	(Sweden); Stockholm	England	9–7	Czech Republic	Sweden		Wales
4	1999	(England); Manchester	England	12–9	Germany	Scotland	8–6	Czech Republic
5	2000	(Scotland); Glasgow	England	11–7	Germany	Scotland	9–8	Czech Republic
6	2001	(Wales); Penarth	Germany	16–8	England	Czech Republic	16–11	Scotland
7	2004	(Czech Republic); Prague	England	7–6	Germany	Scotland	12–10	Sweden
8	2008	(Finland); Lahti	England	14–4	Netherlands	Germany	9–8	Sweden
9	2012	(Netherlands); Amsterdam	England	15–5	Ireland	Sweden	11–10	Netherlands
10	2016	(Hungary); Budapest	England	7–6	Israel	Finland	12–4	Wales
11	2025	(Poland); Wrocław	Israel	9–8	Italy	England	7–4	Ireland

- 2020 postpone to 2022 and later was cancelled.

=== Men Performance ===
Team	1995 (Czech Republic) (6)	1996 (Germany) (6)	1997 (Sweden) (6)	1999 (England) (6)	2000 (Scotland) (6)	2001 (Wales) (6)	2004 (Czech Republic) (12)	2008 (Finland) (18)	2012 (Netherlands) (17)	2016 (Hungary) (24)	2022 (Poland) (22)	2025 (Poland) (24)
Austria								15th		18th	9th	
Belgium									15th	15th	19th	
Bulgaria												24th
Croatia											15th	20th
Czech Republic	2nd	2nd	2nd	4th	4th	3rd	5th	8th	9th	10th	2nd	7th
Denmark							10th	10th		19th	11th	21st
England	1st	1st	1st	1st	1st	2nd	1st	1st	1st	1st	Auto	3rd
Finland							8th	5th	7th	3rd	10th	19th
France								17th	16th	22nd	13th	8th
Germany	6th	6th	5th	2nd	2nd	1st	2nd	3rd	5th	5th	Auto	7th
Greece												10th
Hungary										17th	16th	
Ireland						6th	7th	6th	2nd	11th	Auto	4th
Israel									8th	2nd	Auto	1st
Italy							11th	18th	13th	20th	5th	2nd
Latvia							12th	11th		9th	6th	5th
Luxembourg											•	
Netherlands							9th	2nd	4th	7th	4th	9th
Norway								14th	14th	12th	12th	18th
Poland										14th	7th	15th
Portugal											22nd	17th
Russia										16th	•	
Scotland	4th	3rd	6th	3rd	3rd	4th	3rd	9th	6th	8th	Auto	13th
Slovakia								12th	12th	21st	17th	11th
Slovenia										23rd	21st	
Spain								13th	17th	18th	14th	16th
Sweden	5th	5th	3rd	6th	5th		4th	4th	3rd	13th	8th	22nd
Switzerland								16th	11th	6th	3rd	12th
Turkey											•	
Ukraine											•	23rd
Wales	3rd	4th	4th	5th	6th	5th	6th	7th	10th	4th	Auto	14th

=== Women ===
#	Year	Host	Final			Third Place Match		
#	Year	Host	Champion	Score	Second Place	Third Place	Score	Fourth Place
1	1996; Details	(Germany); Düsseldorf	England		Wales	Scotland		Czech Republic
2	1997; Details	(Sweden); Stockholm	England		Wales	Czech Republic		Sweden
3	1998; Details	(Czech Republic); Prague	Scotland		England	Wales		Czech Republic
4	1999; Details	(England); Manchester	Wales	9–7	England	Czech Republic	12–7	Germany
5	2000; Details	(Scotland); Glasgow	England		Wales	Scotland		Czech Republic
6	2003; Details	(Germany); Göttingen	England	13–2	Scotland	Czech Republic	9–4	Germany
7	2004; Details	(Czech Republic); Prague	Wales	6–5	Scotland	England	10–9	Czech Republic
8	2008; Details	(Finland); Lahti	Wales		England	Scotland		Ireland
9	2012; Details	(Netherlands); Amsterdam	England	11–5	Wales	Scotland	12–7	Germany
10	2015; Details	(Czech Republic); Nymburk	England	11–8	Wales	Scotland	10–9	Israel
11	2019; Details	(Israel); Netanya	England	10–7	Israel	Wales	13–8	Czech Republic
12	2024; Details	(Portugal); Braga	England	12–5	Israel	Scotland	9–7	Wales

=== Women Performance ===
Team	1996 (Germany) (5)	1997 (Sweden) (6)	1998 (Czech Republic) (5)	1999 (England) (6)	2000 (Scotland) (5)	2003 (Germany) (6)	2004 (Czech Republic) (8)	2008 (Finland) (10)	2012 (Netherlands) (12)	2015 (Czech Republic) (17)	2019 (Israel) (19)	2024 (Portugal) (19)
Austria								8th	10th	10th	11th	18th
Belgium										16th		17th
Czech Republic	4th	3rd	4th	3rd	4th	3rd	4th	5th	5th	7th	4th	7th
Denmark							8th					
England	1st	1st	2nd	2nd	1st	1st	3rd	2nd	1st	1st	1st	1st
Finland								9th	9th	11th	16th	16th
Germany	5th	5th	5th	4th	5th	4th	5th	6th	4th	6th	6th	6th
Germany B						6th						
Ireland								4th	8th	5th	7th	5th
Israel										4th	2nd	2nd
Italy										9th	13th	8th
Latvia									12th	8th	9th	9th
Netherlands								10th	7th	13th	8th	10th
Norway										15th	10th	15th
Poland												13th
Portugal												19th
Scotland	3rd	6th	1st	5th	3rd	2nd	2nd	3rd	3rd	3rd	5th	3rd
Scotland B						5th	6th					
Spain										17th	15th	14th
Sweden		4th		6th				7th	6th	14th	14th	11th
Switzerland									11th	12th	12th	12th
Wales	2nd	2nd	3rd	1st	2nd		1st	1st	2nd	2nd	3rd	4th
Wales B							7th					
	1996	1997	1998	1999	2000	2003	2004	2008	2012	2015	2019	2024

== See also ==
- World Lacrosse Championship
- Asia Pacific Lacrosse Championship
- European Box Lacrosse Championships
