= 1998 World Lacrosse Championship =

Tournament details
- Host country: United States
- Venue(s): Baltimore, Maryland
- Dates: July 17–24
- Teams: 11

Final positions
- Champions: United States (7th title)
- Runners-up: Canada
- Third place: Australia
- Fourth place: Haudenosaunee

The 1998 World Lacrosse Championship was the eighth edition of the international men's lacrosse championship. The event took place in Baltimore, Maryland, under the auspices of the International Lacrosse Federation. This was the second time that the tournament was held in Baltimore, following the 1982 tournament. Eleven teams competed in the event in two divisions.

The United States successfully defended their title for the fifth consecutive time, defeating Canada 15–14 in double overtime in the final. The championship game – in which Canada overcame a ten-goal deficit in the third quarter to force overtime – is considered by some to be the most exciting lacrosse game in history.

Australia beat the Iroquois team 17–5 for third place.

== Pool play ==
For the pool play phase of the tournament, the teams were divided into two divisions – five in the top Blue Division and six in the Red Division. Only Blue Division participants were able to compete for the championship.

=== Blue Division ===
Pos	Team	Pld	W	L	GF	GA	GD	Qualification
1	United States	4	4	0	63	38	+25	Advanced to Semifinals
2	Canada	4	3	1	65	40	+25	Advanced to Semifinals
3	Australia	4	2	2	43	40	+3	Advanced to Semifinals
4	Haudenosaunee	4	1	3	35	65	−30	Advanced to Semifinals
5	England	4	0	4	32	53	−21	

United States	20–8	Haudenosaunee
Canada	18–9	England
Haudenosaunee	10–9	England
Australia	9–12	Canada
Canada	23–8	Haudenosaunee
England	6–11	Australia
United States	14–12	Canada
United States	13–10	Australia
Australia	13–9	Haudenosaunee
United States	16–8	England

=== Red Division ===
Pos	Team	Pld	W	L	GF	GA	GD
1	Japan	5	5	0	57	19	+38
2	Germany	5	4	1	59	50	+9
3	Scotland	5	3	2	59	52	+7
4	Sweden	5	2	3	36	50	−14
5	Czech Republic	5	1	4	43	55	−12
6	Wales	5	0	5	32	60	−28

Scotland	14–9	Wales
Japan	10–3	Sweden
Germany	14–10	Czech Republic
Japan	11–4	Germany
Czech Republic	14–15	Scotland
Wales	6–7	Sweden
Germany	16–9	Wales
Scotland	13–7	Sweden
Czech Republic	3–11	Japan
Japan	10–7	Scotland
Czech Republic	8–6	Wales
Germany	13–10	Sweden
Sweden	9–8	Czech Republic
Germany	12–10	Scotland
Japan	15–2	Wales

== Championship Round ==
Semi-finals
July 19
United States	24
Haudenosaunee	4
July 19
Canada	15
Australia	11

Final
July 20
United States	15 (2OT)
Canada	14
Third place
July 20
Haudenosaunee	5
Australia	17

== Consolation round ==
=== 5th-8th place ===
Play-in
July 19
England	13
Scotland	6
July 19
Japan	4
Germany	5

5th place
July 20
England	21
Germany	6
7th place
July 20
Scotland	10 (OT)
Japan	9

=== 9th place ===
19 July 1998
Czech Republic	12–8	Sweden

== Final standings ==
Rank	Team	Record
1st place, gold medalist(s)	United States	6–0
2nd place, silver medalist(s)	Canada	4–2
3rd place, bronze medalist(s)	Australia	3–3
4	Haudenosaunee	1–5
5	England	2–4
6	Germany	5–2
7	Scotland	4–3
8	Japan	5–2
9	Czech Republic	2–4
10	Sweden	2–4
11	Wales	0–5

== Awards ==
=== All World Team ===
The International Lacrosse Federation named an All World Team at the conclusion of the championship, along with four other individual awards.

Goalkeeper

(Canada) Chris Sanderson

Defence

(United States) Brian Voelker
(United States) David Morrow
(Australia) Terry Sparks

Midfield

(Canada) Gary Gait
(United States) Ryan Wade
(Canada) John Tavares

Attack

(United States) Mark Millon
(United States) Darren Lowe
(Canada) Tom Marechek

=== Best Positional Players ===
(Canada) Chris Sanderson - Goalkeeper
(United States) Brian Voelker - Defence
(Canada) Gary Gait - Midfield
(United States) Mark Millon - Attack

=== Tournament MVP ===
(United States) Ryan Wade - Midfield

== See also ==
- 1998 World Lacrosse Championship Final
- Field lacrosse
- World Lacrosse, the governing body for world lacrosse
- World Lacrosse Championship
