= Italy men's national lacrosse team =

Italy
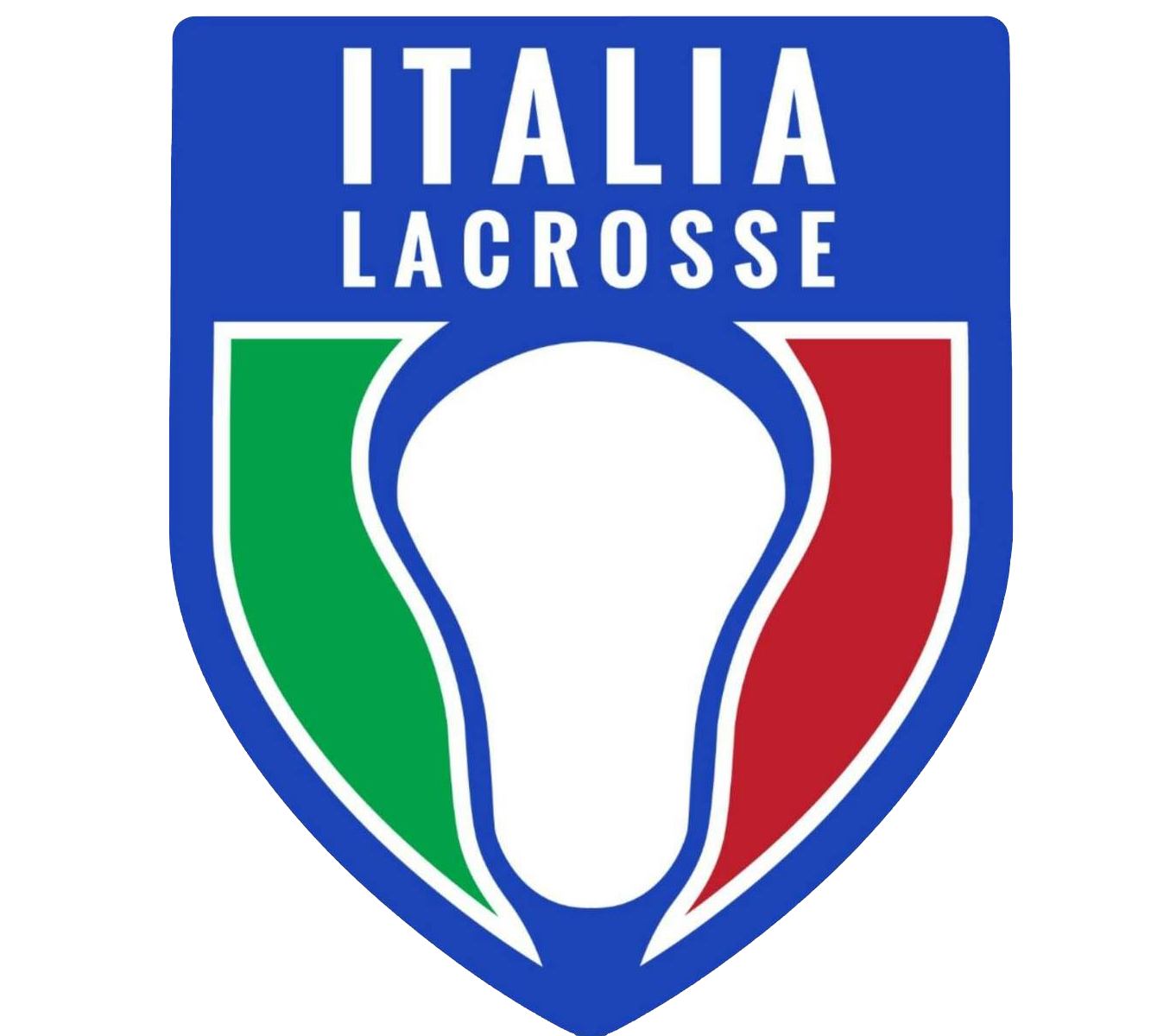
- Nickname(s): Azzurri, Italia Lax
- WL membership: 2002
- Association: Federazione Italiana Hockey - Divisione Lacrosse
- Confederation: ELF (Europe)
- Head coach: Brian Vona

World Championship
- Appearances: 5 (first in 2006)
- Best result: 9th place (2023)
- Website: https://www.lacrosseitalia.it/

The Italy men's national lacrosse team represents Italy in international lacrosse competitions. It is organized by the Federazione Italiana Giuoco Lacrosse. It has participated in 4 World championships and 5 European championships.

It was initially formed exclusively by naturalised players due to the almost total absence of the discipline in Italy. Subsequently, thanks to the important development of Lacrosse in Italy, starting from the 2008 European Championships in Lahti, Italy was able to field a majority of native players, a feature strongly desired and pursued by the FIGL and its founders Fabio Antonelli and Robert Corna to encourage the growth of sport in the country.

== History ==
The history of the Italian national lacrosse team began in 2002 with the formation of a team (called "Italy United") made up exclusively of naturalised players who participated in an international lacrosse tournament associated with the 2002 World Lacrosse Championship in Perth. Promoter of the initiative, as well as captain and coach of the team, was the Italian-American Robert Corna, the first athlete to practice lacrosse in Italy and to promote its diffusion at a national level.

In 2004, the Italian national team led by Robert Corna participated, with teams made up of both native Italian and naturalised players, in the European Championship Newcomer's Tournament in Salzburg and in the European Lacrosse Championship in Prague.

In 2006, an Italian team made up exclusively of naturalised players finished the world championship held in London, Ontario in 10th place, achieving important victories against Hong Kong (20-0), Wales (20-7), Scotland (10- 7) and the Czech Republic (14-7), before bowing out to Finland (10-9) in the play-off for 9th place.

Following the birth of the Federazione Italiana Giuoco Lacrosse (founded in 2007), lacrosse began to develop more on the Italian peninsula, through the foundation of lacrosse clubs that allowed the national team to train native players. A young and inexperienced Italy, with many rookies in the squad, then participated in the 2008 European Championships in Lahti, finishing in 18th place.

Thanks to a newer national league and to better training and infrastructures, Italy started the 2010 World Cup in Manchester with greater talent and experience. The Azzurri ended the tournament with a victory over Latvia (13-8) which allowed them to close the world championship in 19th place.

At the 2012 European Championships in Amsterdam, the Italian national team ranked 13th out of 20 participating nations, winning 6 matches, 4 of which in a row. The Azzurri thus obtained the highest number of victories in an international competition. It also equalled the number of 4 consecutive victories of the national team which occurred in 2006, 2010 and 2023.

At the 2023 World Lacrosse Championship, the Italian national team reached its best result ever after winning the 9th place game against Puerto Rico.

== Competitive record ==
=== World Lacrosse Championships record ===
Year	Result
(Canada) 2006	10th place
(England) 2010	19th place
(United States) 2014	18th place
(Israel) 2018	16th place
(United States) 2023	9th place

=== European Lacrosse Championships record ===
Year	Result
(Czech Republic) 2004	11th place
(Finland) 2008	18th place
(Netherlands) 2012	13th place
(Hungary) 2016	21st place
