= Lacrosse in Scotland =

- Country: Scotland
- Governing body: Lacrosse Scotland
- National teams: Men's national team Women's national team

International competitions
- World Lacrosse Championship; Women's Lacrosse World Cup

Lacrosse in Scotland is primarily played by women and is nationally governed by Lacrosse Scotland.

== History ==
The first modern women’s lacrosse game was played in 1890 at the St Leonards School in Scotland, where women's lacrosse had been introduced by Louisa Lumsden. Lumsden brought the game to Scotland after watching a men's lacrosse game between the Canghuwaya Indians and the Montreal Lacrosse Club. Lumsden, in a letter written home from the White Mountains in New Hampshire dated 6 September 1884, recounted her visit to watch that match. She wrote: It is a wonderful game, beautiful and graceful. (I was so charmed with it that I introduced it at St Leonards.)" [sic]

One of Lumsden's students, Rosabelle Sinclair, established the first women's lacrosse team in the United States at the Bryn Mawr School in Baltimore, Maryland.

Scotland was a founder member of the International Federation of Women's Lacrosse Associations in 1972, which merged with the International Lacrosse Federation (the former governing body for men's lacrosse) to form the Federation of International Lacrosse (FIL) in August 2008.

Prior to the Lockerbie air disaster in December 1988, the men's game had not been represented in Scotland since the turn of the 20th century. The tragedy of Pan Am Flight 103 saw many Syracuse University students perish and on a memorial visit one year later the University's lacrosse team were surprised that there was no Scotland Men's National Team for them to compete against. The country was challenged to pull together an inaugural and bona fide team; this was achieved some eight months later and following the 1990 World Championships the men's team played their first representative match. Scotland has now played memorial games against Syracuse during visits to Lockerbie to pay their respects to those lost in the air disaster, and hope this fixture will continue into the future.

In 1993, Edinburgh hosted the Women's Lacrosse World Cup.
