= Croatia men's national lacrosse team =

Croatia
- Association: Croatia Lacrosse Association
- Confederation: ELF (Europe)
- Head coach: Mike Knezevich and Kevin Boyle

World Championship
- Appearances: 1 (first in 2018)
- Website: croatia-lacrosse.com

The Croatia's national lacrosse team, also known as Croatian: Hrvatska Lacrosse reprezentacija, represents the Republic of Croatia in international lacrosse competitions. It is organized by the Croatian Lacrosse Association. Current coaches are Mike Knezevich and Kevin Boyle.

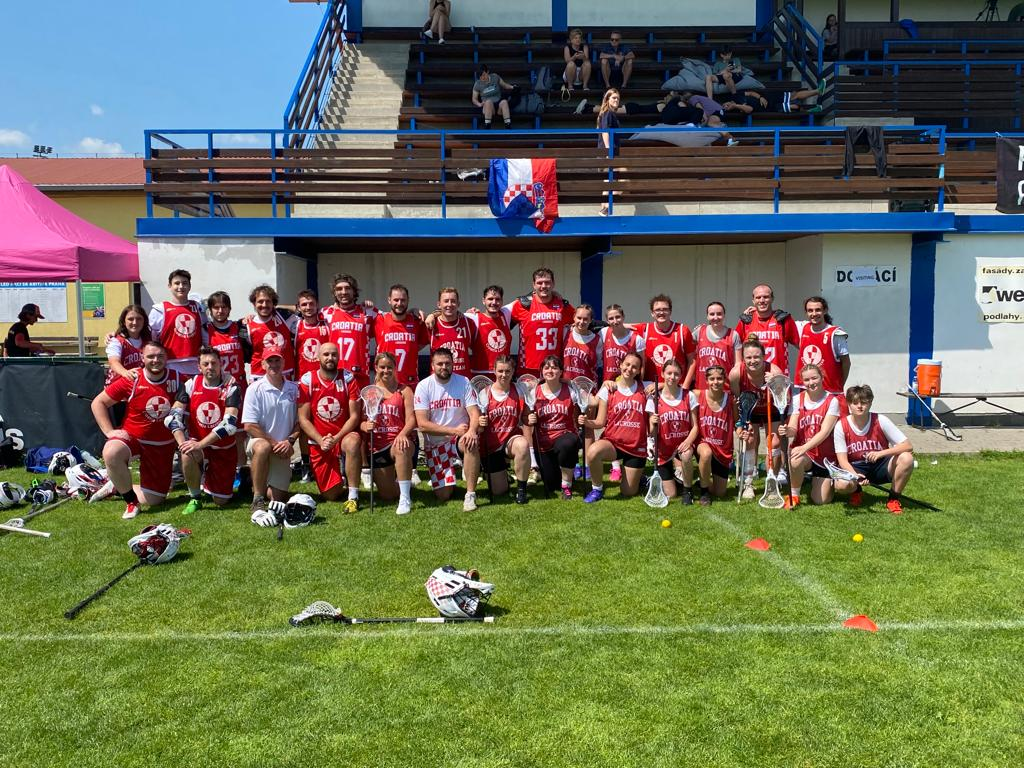
Croatian men's and women's lacrosse team at a Lacrosse Prague Cup 2023

== History ==
Lacrosse in Croatia started in 2011 as a project of local fans of the sport who started with the first Lacrosse trainings in Zagreb with limited knowledge and equipment. Thanks to the help of coaches from North America, the sport began to grow in popularity in Croatia. At the end of 2014 and the beginning of 2015, with the help of American lacrosse enthusiasts, the plans to form the Croatian national lacrosse team began. First plan was to compete in 2016 European Lacrosse Championship, however due to financial constraints, the Croatian national lacrosse team competed in a smaller parallel tournament for freshly formed national teams instead.

In 2018, Croatian national lacrosse team competed in its first official international tournament, 2018 World Lacrosse Championship. In the tournament, Croatia scored its first win against Chinese Taipei in first play-in game of a lower bracket, after losing both games in group stages against New Zealand and Spain. After further losses against Hungary, Bermuda and China, victory against Turkey ensured the 43rd place in their first international tournament. The next international tournament appearance was supposed to happen at 2020 European Lacrosse Championship, however due to COVID-19 pandemic, the tournament was postponed and eventually in 2022 replaced with European Lacrosse Qualifiers for the 2023 World Lacrosse Championship. In European Qualifiers, Croatian team started strong with a 7–5 victory against Hungary, however a crushing 1–9 defeat against Austria lowered the qualifying chances drastically. Croatian team defeated Slovenia 14–7 before ultimately losing to Switzerland 7–8 and Italy 7–12 to finish 4th in a group of 6 and missing out on qualifying to 2023 World Lacrosse Championship. In 2023, Croatian men's lacrosse team participated in Lacrosse Prague Cup, finishing 3rd.

== Competitive record ==
=== World Lacrosse Championship ===
| Year | Host | GP | W | L | GF | GA | Finish |
|---|---|---|---|---|---|---|---|
| 2018 | Israel | 7 | 2 | 5 | 47 | 82 | 43rd |
| 2023 | United States | Not qualified | | | | | − |
| Total | − | 7 | 2 | 5 | 47 | 82 | No Medal |
