= Lacrosse in Spain =

Spanish Lacrosse Association
- Country: Spain
- Governing body: Spanish Lacrosse Association
- National teams: Men's national team Women's national team

International competitions
- World Lacrosse Championship; Women's Lacrosse World Cup

Lacrosse in Spain has its origins in the 2000s in Madrid. It is currently governed by the Spanish Lacrosse Association.

== Spanish Lacrosse Association ==
Asociación Española de Lacrosse
- Sport: Lacrosse
- Abbreviation: AEL
- Affiliation: European Lacrosse Federation
- Headquarters: Madrid, Spain

Official website
- www.spainlacrosse.org
- (Spain)

The Spanish Lacrosse Association (in Spanish: Asociación Española de Lacrosse) is the official governing body of lacrosse in Spain and is a member of the Federation of International Lacrosse and the European Lacrosse Federation. It was founded to develop and promote lacrosse within Spain.

It conducts the men's and the women's teams.

== Club tournaments ==
=== LEL ===
The Liga Española de Lacrosse is the main lacrosse competition in Spain. Until 2013, it was usual that teams without enough players played combined. Since 2014, a new league format was approved dividing teams into LEL and LEL2, joining the LEL only the teams that have at least ten players.

In 2011, the league changed its name to Liga Ibérica de Lacrosse as Portuguese team ACM Coimbra participated in two stages of the league.

Season	Champion	Runner-up	Third
2009–10	Madrid Lacrosse	UEM Lacrosse	Sevilla+Barcelona
2010–11	UEM Lacrosse	Sevilla Lacrosse	Chamberí Lacrosse
2012–13	Madrid Lacrosse	UC3M	UH Gijón
2014	Madrid Lacrosse	UH Gijón	Montes Lacrosse
2015	Madrid Lacrosse	UH Gijón	Montes Lacrosse
2016	Madrid Lacrosse	Sevilla Lacrosse	Barcelona Bandits
2016–17	Madrid Lacrosse	Sevilla Lacrosse	Barcelona Dracs

=== LEL 2 ===
The Liga Española de Lacrosse 2 was created in 2014 and is the second tier of the Spanish lacrosse league system. It is played in a 5x5 format between the reserve teams of LEL and teams that have few players.

Season	Champion	Runner-up	Third
2014	Sevilla Lacrosse	Barcelona Bandits	Arcas Lax
2015	Sevilla Lacrosse		
2016	Madrid Lacrosse	Donosti Wolves	Alicante Barefoots

=== LELF ===
The Liga Española de Lacrosse Femenino is the main women's league in Spain. It was played by the first time in 2014 with seven teams, four of them combined in two. In 2013 there were played several exhibition games during the LEL rounds between Madrid and Cuenca, the two first women's lacrosse teams in Spain.

Season	Champion	Runner-up	Third
2014	Euskal Lacrosse Elkartea	Madrid Lacrosse	Arcas+Montes
2015	Euskal Lacrosse Elkartea	Madrid Lacrosse	
2016	Madrid Lacrosse	Barcelona Bandits	

== Editions of the Spanish Lacrosse League ==
=== 2014 ===
The 2014 Liga Española de Lacrosse was the 4th edition of this tournament. Composed by three teams, it was the first edition played with a round-robin tournament with the clubs with more than 11 players in their roster.

Pos	Team	Pld	W	D	L	GF	GA	GD	Pts	MAD	GIJ	MON
1	Madrid Lacrosse (C)	4	4	0	0	51	12	+39	8	—	7–5	9–4
2	UH Gijón	3	1	0	2	12	28	−16	2	2–17	—	NP
3	Montes Lacrosse	3	0	0	3	9	32	−23	0	1–18	4–5	—

Source: Spain Lacrosse
Rules for classification: 1) Points; 2) Goal difference; 3) Number of goals scored
(C) Champions

=== 2015 ===
The 2015 Liga Española de Lacrosse was the 5th edition of this tournament. Composed by four teams, it was played between 3 February and 14 June. ANV Cuervos retired after its first game (17–0 against Madrid) and all its games were declared with a result of 0–15; however, they are not included in this table.

Pos	Team	Pld	W	D	L	GF	GA	GD	Pts	MAD	GIJ	BIZ
1	Madrid Lacrosse (C)	4	3	0	1	45	23	+22	6	—	18–2	14–4
2	UH Gijón	4	3	0	1	32	24	+8	6	15–0	—	9–2
3	Bizkaia Black Crows	4	0	0	4	12	42	−30	0	2–13	4–6	—

Source: Spain Lacrosse
Rules for classification: 1) Points; 2) Goal difference; 3) Number of goals scored
(C) Champions

=== 2016 ===
The 2016 Liga Española de Lacrosse was the 6th edition of this tournament. Composed by four teams, it was played between 4 March and 19 June with a double round-robin tournament format, giving 2 points for a win and one point for a loss. Cancelled games would penalise the team implied with four points.

Pos	Team	Pld	W	D	L	GF	GA	GD	Pts	MAD	SEV	BAR	BIZ
1	Madrid Lacrosse (Note: Points adjustment due to cancelled matches: Madrid Lacrosse (–4), Sevilla Lacrosse (+4), Barcelona Bandits (–4), Bizkaia Black Crows (+4)) (C)	10	8	1	1	45	33	+12	13	—	7–4; 1–7	6–6; 14–0	9–0; 9–0
2	Sevilla Lacrosse	6	1	1	4	28	30	−2	7	4–6; 4–6	—	c	c
3	Barcelona Bandits	10	3	4	3	52	38	+14	6	2–6; 6–9	4–4; 6–5	—	5–5; 5–5
4	Bizkaia Black Crows	6	0	2	4	22	46	−24	6	c	c	6–9; 6–9	—

Source: Spain Lacrosse
Rules for classification: 1) Points; 2) Goal difference; 3) Number of goals scored
(C) Champions

=== 2016–17 ===
The 2016–17 Liga Española de Lacrosse was the 7th edition of the main Spanish Lacrosse League. For this edition, the old division between LEL and LEL2 was abolished and a new competition system was instated. The seven teams were divided into two conferences:

- Eastern Conference: Alicante Barefoots, Cuenca Lacrosse and Barcelona Dracs
- Western Conference: Lisboa Gladiators, Sevilla Lacrosse, Madrid Lacrosse and Montes Lacrosse

Each team would play home and away against the other two teams of its conference and will play also one more game home and other away against two different teams, totalling six games played per team. The inter-conference games were decided taking the distance of the teams as main criteria.

The seven first qualified teams overall will qualify directly to the quarterfinals while the two bottom teams will play themselves a previous game to qualify.

==== Regular season ====
Regular season started on 29 October 2016 and ended on 22 April 2017.

Pos	Cnf	Team	Pld	W	L	GF	GA	GD	Qualification	SEV	MAD	BAR	ALI	MON	CUE	LIS
1	W	Sevilla Lacrosse	6	6	0	85	18	+67	Semifinals	—	—	—	—	15–4	17–3	20–1
2	W	Madrid Lacrosse	6	5	1	69	15	+54	Quarterfinals	—	—	—	8–0	0–8 (Note: Match given to Montes due to illegal alignment of Madrid. It originally ended 21–3 for Madrid.)	—	16–0
3	E	Barcelona Dracs	6	5	1	65	38	+27	Quarterfinals	—	5–16	—	9–8	—	8–0	—
4	E	Alicante Barefoots	6	2	4	55	42	+13	Quarterfinals	2–9	—	11–12	—	—	19–1	—
5	W	Montes Lacrosse	6	2	4	41	59	−18	Quarterfinals	7–14	1–11	0–17	—	—	—	—
6	E	Cuenca Lacrosse	6	1	5	16	76	−60	Quarterfinals	—	—	3–14	3–15	—	—	6–2
7	W	Lisboa Gladiators	6	0	6	7	91	−84	Quarterfinals	1–10	1–18	—	—	2–21	—	—

Source: Spain Lacrosse, Spain Lacrosse

==== Playoffs ====
The playoffs took part in Madrid on 6 and 7 May 2017.

Quarterfinals
6 May
Alicante Barefoots	12
Montes Lacrosse	2
6 May
Madrid Lacrosse
Lisboa Gladiators (w)
6 May
Barcelona Dracs	16
Cuenca Lacrosse	0

Semifinals
7 May
Sevilla Lacrosse	12
Alicante Barefoots	9
7 May
Madrid Lacrosse	9
Barcelona Dracs	4

Final
7 May
Sevilla Lacrosse	7
Madrid Lacrosse	14
Third place
7 May
Alicante Barefoots	8
Barcelona Dracs	9

Fifth place
7 May
Montes Lacrosse	5
Cuenca Lacrosse	2

=== 2017–18 ===
The 2017–18 Liga Española de Lacrosse is the 8th edition of the Spanish Lacrosse League. The seven teams from the previous season and the reserve team of Barcelona Dracs will join the competition. These eight teams were divided into the same conferences as in the previous season:

- Eastern Conference: Alicante Barefoots, Cuenca Bucks, Barcelona Dracs and Barcelona Dracs B
- Western Conference: Lisboa Gladiators, Sevilla Lacrosse, Madrid Lacrosse and Montes Lacrosse

==== Regular season ====
The regular season started on 11 November 2017.

Pos	Cnf	Team	Pld	W	L	GF	GA	GD	Qualification	MAD	BAR	SEV	ALI	BAB	MON	CUE	LIS
1	W	Madrid Lacrosse	3	3	0	43	8	+35	Quarterfinals	—					13–6		15–0
2	E	Barcelona Dracs	3	3	0	58	28	+30	Quarterfinals		—		15–7	15–7		28–8	
3	W	Sevilla Lacrosse	1	1	0	21	1	+20	Quarterfinals	3–10		—					20–0
4	E	Alicante Barefoots	2	1	1	21	22	−1	Quarterfinals		13–15		—	8–7		16–6	
5	E	Barcelona Dracs B	3	1	2	21	29	−8	Quarterfinals		3–21		4–16	—		7–6	
6	W	Montes Lacrosse	2	0	2	8	28	−20	Quarterfinals	2–15	2–18			6–5	—		
7	E	Cuenca Bucks	2	0	2	14	35	−21	Quarterfinals		6–22	5–6	8–14			—	
8	W	Lisboa Gladiators	2	0	2	1	36	−35	Quarterfinals	1–11		1–21					—

Source: Spain Lacrosse at Facebook

==== Playoffs ====
Playoffs took part in Seville.

Quarterfinals
Sevilla Lacrosse	4
Cuenca Lacrosse	2
Madrid Lacrosse	6
Barcelona Dracs B	3
Alicante Barefoots	13
Lisboa Gladiators	2

Semifinals
Barcelona Dracs	15
Sevilla Lacrosse	9
Madrid Lacrosse	13
Alicante Barefoots	9

Final
Barcelona Dracs	13
Madrid Lacrosse	12
Third place
Sevilla Lacrosse	1
Alicante Barefoots	10

Fifth position group

- Cuenca Lacrosse 2–4 Barcelona Dracs B
- Barcelona Dracs B 5–2 Lisboa Gladiators
- Cuenca Lacrosse 9–3 Lisboa Gladiators
