= Ryan Wade =

American lacrosse player

Ryan Wade is a former UNC and Team USA lacrosse player. Ryan attended Severn High School in Severna Park, MD. He then played college lacrosse at the University of North Carolina, winning the national championship in 1991. He was two-time ACC player of the year and named first team All-American three years. He played for Team USA on the 1994 and 1998 national teams and was named MVP of the 1998 team. In 1995 he played for Western Australia which won a historic Australian National Championship defeating Victoria in Melbourne, Australia.

Wade was elected to the National Lacrosse Hall of Fame in 2013.

== University of North Carolina ==
Season	GP	G	A	Pts	GB
1991	15	10	3	13	60
1992	15	27	7	34	58
1993	16	29	7	36	106
1994	15	25	14	39	99
Totals	61	91	31	122	323
