= Israel men's national lacrosse team =

Men's national lacrosse team of Israel

Israel
- Association: Israel Lacrosse Association
- Confederation: ELF (Europe)

World Championship
- Appearances: 3 (first in 2014)
- Best result: Seventh place (2014, 2018, 2023)

European Championship
- Appearances: 3 (first in 2012)
- Best result: Champions (2025)
Medal record
European Championship
Gold medal – first place	2025 Wrocław
Silver medal – second place	2016 Hungary

The Israel men's national lacrosse team represents Israel at men's field lacrosse events. It is governed by the Israel Lacrosse Association.

== History ==
Israel became able to compete in international tournaments once the Israel Lacrosse Association was officially recognized by World Lacrosse in April 2011. In preparation for their first World Lacrosse Championship in 2014, Israel held tryouts in July 2013 at Wingate Institute in Netanya, selecting a roster of 46 men. The roster consisted of both Israelis and non-Israeli Jews from around the world, with the majority of the roster composed of Americans. Any Jew, due to being eligible for Israeli citizenship under the law of return may play for Israel in the tournament, based on the rules of World Lacrosse.

The Israel men's national lacrosse team defeated Ireland 12–11 in a friendly in June 2012. They went on to participate in their first international competition, the 2012 European Lacrosse Championships in Amsterdam.

Israel finished as silver medalists at the 2016 European Lacrosse Championship, losing to England in the final.

Israel later won the 2025 European Lacrosse Championship in Poland, defeating Italy in the final.

== Competitive record ==
=== World Lacrosse Championship ===
Year	Result
(United States) 2014	7th place
(Israel) 2018	7th place
(United States) 2023	7th place
(Japan) 2027	TBD

=== European Lacrosse Championship ===
Year	Result
(Netherlands) 2012	8th place
(Hungary) 2016	(silver) 2nd place
(Poland) 2025	(gold) 1st place
