= Lacrosse Scotland =

Governing body for lacrosse in Scotland

- Jurisdiction: National
- Founded: 1920
- Affiliation: World Lacrosse, European Lacrosse Federation
- Headquarters: Caledonia House, EH12 9DQ
- Location: Edinburgh
- Chairperson: Mason Robbins
- Men's coach: Matt Bagley
- Women's coach: Ailsa Scott
- Sponsor: ION8, Opro

Official website
- lacrossescotland.com
- (Scotland)

Lacrosse Scotland is the national governing body of lacrosse in Scotland. Previously known as the Scottish Lacrosse Association (SLA), name changed upon incorporation in 2005. It is a member of the Federation of International Lacrosse and the European Lacrosse Federation. It sends representative teams to participate in the Men's World Lacrosse Championship and the Women's Lacrosse World Cup. In the Men's 2006 World Lacrosse Championship, the national team placed eleventh out of twenty-one competing countries, and at the 2005 Women's World Cup, the national women's team placed seventh out of ten countries. Scotland also participates in both the men's and women's Under-19 World Championships.
