= Dutch Lacrosse Association =

Governing body of lacrosse in the Netherlands

- Nederlandse Lacrosse Bond
- Sport: Lacrosse
- Jurisdiction: National
- Founded: 2003
- Affiliation: Federation of International Lacrosse
- Chairman: Hendrik van Sandick

Official website
- www.nederlandlacrosse.nl
- (Netherlands)

The Dutch Lacrosse Association (Dutch: Nederlandse Lacrosse Bond) is the official governing body of lacrosse in the Netherlands. The Nederland Lacrosse Bond sponsors both a men's and women's national team. The national team programs are supported by a burgeoning domestic club league (the DNLL consists of 12 men's teams, while the WDNLL supports six female teams). The NLB is a full member of both the Federation of International Lacrosse (FIL) and the European Lacrosse Federation (ELF).

The Netherlands' first international tournament was in 2004 when the men's team competed at the European Lacrosse Championships in Prague, Czech Republic. The team finished 9th out of 12 countries. Since then, the men's national team has competed at the World Lacrosse Championships in 2006, 2010, 2014 and 2018, with their best showing of 8th place in 2010. The team competed at the European Lacrosse Championships in 2008, 2012, and 2016, plus a host of smaller invitational club tournaments throughout Europe. Their best finish was a Silver medal at the 2008 ELF.

The women's first campaign was in 2008 when the team finished 10th at the European Lacrosse Championships in Lahti, Finland. The women’s team took 7th place in 2012 and 13th place in 2015.

== Men's 2018 World Lacrosse Championships, Netanya, Israel ==
The Netherlands started in the white division together with Norway and Japan. The Netherlands finished 22nd of the 46 participating teams at the world championship.

=== Roster: Men ===
Name	Position	Home team
Thomas Haitsma	Goalie	Utrecht
Tijmen Blom	Defense	Delft
Geoff Davis	Defense	Gettysburg
Jorrit Duininck	Defense	Amsterdam
Jan Jaap van Noort	Defense	Amsterdam
Ryan Phillips	Defense	.
Stijn Schetters	Defense	Utrecht
Jorik van Baal	Midfield	Utrecht
Jasper Barsingerhorn	Midfield	Delft
Matthew Finnegan	Midfield	Amsterdam
Charlie McCormick	Midfield	Georgetown
Wieland Muskens	Midfield	Utrecht
Graham Rikhof	Midfield	Utrecht
Lieven Slenders	Midfield	Utrecht
Jimmy van de Veerdonk	Midfield	Oneonta
Daniel Velleman	Midfield	Amsterdam
Bas Verhaar	Midfield	Amsterdam
Jelle-Eric de Vries	Midfield	Amsterdam
Hielke de Vries	Midfield	Amsterdam
Steve Luna	Attack	Amsterdam
Konradin Muskens	Attack	Utrecht
Jelle Tuinhout	Attack	Tilburg
John van de Veerdonk	Attack	Georgetown

== Men's 2014 World Lacrosse Championships, Denver, CO, USA ==
=== Results: Men ===
Date	Round	Opponent	Score
June 20, 2012	Group Stage Green Division	China	W, 19-4
June 22, 2012	Group Stage Green Division	Norway	L, 11-12 (OT)
June 23, 2012	Group Stage Green Division	Italy	W, 14-8
June 24, 2012	Round Robin	New Zealand	L, 10-14
June 25, 2012	Round Robin	Finland	L, 6-7
June 26, 2012	Round Robin	Finland	L, 6-15
June 27, 2012	15th place game	Switzerland	L, 6-9

=== Roster: Men ===
Number	Name	Position	Home team
1	Rick van Niekerk	Goal	Amsterdam Lions
4	Jesse Morsinkoff	Goal	Domstad Devils
30	Lionel van Est	Defence	Groningen Gladiators
33	Ian de Ruiter	Defence	Muhlenberg College
36	Ryan Philips	Defence	SUNY Plattsburgh
77	Justin Maarschalkerweerd	Defence	Anne Arundel Community College
13	Maxwell Wasscher	LSM	MSOE Raiders
47	Rick Emondts	LSM	Amsterdam Lions
12	Graham Bergsma	Midfield	BHC Lacrosse
56	Jorik van Baal	Midfield	Domstad Devils
9	James van de Veerdonk	Midfield	SUNY Oneonta
35	Graham Rikhof	Midfield	Groningen Gladiators
2	Rutger van Bennekum	Midfield	Amsterdam Lions
6	Hielke-Martijn de Vries	Midfield	Amsterdam Lions
22	Erwin Lijklema	Midfield	Domstad Devils
14	Brian Zimmerman	Midfield	University of Maryland
25	Rick van Kruchten	Midfield	Amsterdam Lions
7	Ingmar Klienbannink	Attack	Delft Barons
82	Jelle Tuinhout	Attack	Tilburg Titans
24	Adrian Shaproski	Attack	Amsterdam Lions
11	Aaron Vanderhorst	Attack	Nanaimo Timbermen
17	Kyle Hofstaedter	Attack	Tilburg Titans
32	Scott Janssen	Attack	Saint Joseph's University

STAFF

- Head coach: Neal Powless
- Assistant coach: Bill Bjorness
- Assistant coach: Jared Fotis
- Assistant coach: Ryan Demorest
- Physio: Mary Stein
- Team Manager: Mary Bergman

== Men's & Women's 2012 European Lacrosse Championships, Amsterdam, Netherlands ==
=== Results: Men ===
Date	Round	Opponent	Score
June 20, 2012	Group Stage Blue Division	Germany	L, 8-9
June 22, 2012	Group Stage Blue Division	Sweden	L, 7-13
June 23, 2012	Group Stage Blue Division	Ireland	W, 11-7
June 24, 2012	Group Stage Blue Division	Finland	L, 3-13
June 25, 2012	Group Stage Blue Division	England	L, 4-18
June 26, 2012	Round Robin	Czech Republic	W, 9-8 (OT)
June 27, 2012	Quarter Final	Israel	W, 18-3
June 28, 2012	Semi Final	England	L, 5-14
June 29, 2012	Bronze Medal Game	Sweden	L, 10-11

=== Roster: Men ===
Number	Name	Position	Home team
9	Grant Zimmerman	Goal	UNC Tar Heels
1	Rick van Niekerk	Goal	Amsterdam Lions
30	Lionel van Est	Defence	Groningen Gladiators
6	Thijs Bijloo	Defence	Keizerstad Kannibalz
33	Ian de Ruiter	Defence	Muhlenberg College
36	Ryan Philips	Defence	SUNY Plattsburgh
21	Gerard Helminck	Defence	Groningen Gladiators
23	Sean Tyson	LSM	Simon Fraser University
91	Bram Durieux	LSM	Delft Barons
12	Graham Bergsma	Midfield	Durham Turfdogs
43	Ingmar Bolderink	Midfield	Delft Barons
56	Jorik van Baal	Midfield	Domstad Devils
8	Auke Dijkstra	Midfield	Amsterdam Lions
22	Phil Heijkoop	Midfield	Delft Barons
24	Hans Kortman	Midfield	Keizerstad Kannibalz
14	Jelle-Eric de Vries	Midfield	Amsterdam Lions
25	Rick van Kruchten	Midfield	Amsterdam Lions
7	Ingmar Klienbannink	Midfield	Rotterdam Jaguars
11	Josh Ledderhof	Attack	Delft Barons
59	Lex Janssen	Attack	Delft Barons
3	Peter van Vliet	Attack	Domstad Devils
39	Scott Janssen	Attack	Mercyhurst College
10	Ben van Ooijen	Attack	Amsterdam Lions

STAFF

- Head coach: Michael O'Neill
- Assistant coach: Owen Zachariasse
- Assistant coach: Christopher Cooper
- Assistant coach: Ryan Demorest
- Assistant: Mike Malloy
- Physio: Stijn Haverkamp
- Team Manager: Paul Kortman

== Men's 2010 World Lacrosse Championships, Manchester, England ==
=== Results ===
Date	Opponent	Score
July 16, 2010	Wales	L, 9-10
July 17, 2010	Argentina	W, 29-3
July 18, 2010	Austria	W, 17-5
July 19, 2010	Spain	W, 16-1
July 20, 2010	Wales	W, 9-8 (OT)
July 21, 2010	Japan	L, 8-14
July 22, 2010	Germany	L, 1-14
July 23, 2010	Scotland	L, 10-11

=== Roster ===
Name	Position	Home team	Number
Grant Zimmerman	Goal	UNC Tar Heels	33
Eduard van Opstal	Goal	Domstad Devils/Virginia Cavaliers	5
Joop-Joost Hietbrink	Defence	Amsterdam Lions	44
Stefan van de Ven	Defence	Rotterdam Jaguars	6
Ben van Ooijen	Defence	Amsterdam Lions	10
Ryan Philips	Defence	SUNY Plattsburgh	36
Gerard Helminck	Defence	Groningen Gladiators	21
Sean Tyson	LSM	Simon Fraser	23
Graham Bergsma	Midfield	Fairfield Stags	12
Alex Jones	Midfield	Dominican Chargers	11
Kyle Hofstaedter	Midfield	St. Joseph's Hawks	17
Auke Dijkstra	Midfiels	Amsterdam Lions	8
Phil Heijkoop	Midfield	Delft Barons	22
Rutger van Bennekum	Midfield	Rotterdam Jaguars	2
Jelle-Eric de Vries	Midfield	Amsterdam Lions	14
Rick van Kruchten	Midfield	Groningen Gladiators	25
Lex Janssen	Midfield	Delft Barons	59
Ingmar Klienbannink	Midfield	Rotterdam Jaguars	7
Kyle van Oostendorp	Attack	Washington College	9
Jorrit Grob	Attack	Groningen Gladiators	4
Peter van Vliet	Attack	Domstad Devils	3
Scott Janssen	Attack	Mercyhurst	1
Hans Kortman	Attack	Keizerstad Kannibalz	24

STAFF

- Head coach: Travis Taylor
- Assistant coach: Macgregor Stockdale
- Assistant coach: Travis Gillespie
- Physio: Bart Hendriks
- Physio: Daan Reutelingsperger
- Team Manager: Guy Kessels

== Men's 2008 European Championship campaign ==
The Netherlands competed in their second European Lacrosse Championship in 2008 in Lahti, Finland. They compiled a 6-2 record at the tournament, finishing 2nd place behind defending European champions, England. The team surprised the lacrosse world, defeating traditional European lacrosse powers such as Sweden, Ireland and Germany before making their appearance in the gold medal game. The success of the Dutch campaign garnered mention in major lacrosse publications and placed the Netherlands on the lacrosse map for the first time in history.

The Dutch team played in the C Division, featuring Austria, Denmark, France, Scotland, and Sweden. They compiled a 4-1 record in round robin play, resulting in a three-way tie for first with Sweden and Scotland, and a goals for/against record of 76/25. Goal differential determined that Sweden would finish first, with the Netherlands taking the second spot of the group. The Dutch team went on to beat Ireland and Germany in elimination play before losing to perennial champions England in the championship final.

Many attributed the team's success in Finland to the two weeks of isolation and training in Den Helder prior to the tournament.

=== Game results ===
The Netherlands opened the tournament with a convincing win over Austria, beating Sweden the very next day in a tightly contested 1 goal match. They then went on to beat Denmark before losing a controversial one goal game to Scotland. The team concluded group play with a lopsided victory over newcomer France.

A second-place finish in Group C advanced the Dutch team to the knockout stage of the tournament. They beat Ireland in a closely fought one-goal quarterfinal game before rolling the Germans in a convincing 12-6 semi-final victory.

The Dutch team played 8 games in 10 days at various fields throughout Lahti, Finland. Detailed game results are listed below.

Date	Opponent	Score
Thursday, August 7, 2008	Austria	W, 25-4
Friday, August 8, 2008	Sweden	W, 8-7
Saturday, August 9, 2008	Denmark	W, 17-5
Sunday, August 10, 2008	Scotland	L, 6-7
Monday, August 11, 2008	France	W, 20-1
Tuesday, August 12, 2008	Ireland	W, 11-10
Thursday, August 14, 2008	Germany	W, 12-6
Saturday, August 16, 2008	England	L, 4-14

=== Team organization ===
At the helm of the men's national program was long time lacrosse business man, John Bergsma. John's wealth of experience within the National Lacrosse League and Team Canada was supported by coaches from both North America and the United Kingdom. Travis Taylor, a native of New Westminster, British Columbia and head coach at the University of Bristol, was named head coach, while MacGregor Stockdale (a former defenseman at Brown University), Nigel Greenall (head coach of Ashton lacrosse in Northern England), and Richard Bos (Groningen Lacrosse, Netherlands) were all hired as assistant coaches.

The team formed new sponsorships for the European campaign, dropping their previous partnerships with Riddell and STX. Team helmets were provided by New York–based Cascade Sports and all equipment and apparel was provided by Michigan based Warrior Sports.

=== Tournament preparation ===
The Dutch team centralized in the Netherlands two weeks before the European Championships, bringing all players to Den Helder (in the north of the Netherlands) for an intensive 14-day training camp.

The NLB formed a strategic partnership with the Royal Netherlands Navy, using their extensive facilities in Den Helder as preparation grounds for the campaign in Finland. In addition to their grueling three-a-day practice schedule, the Dutch team took part in several naval training exercises, followed a strict eating regime, and stayed in barracks on the base.

For press purposes, one practice was scheduled at a field outside of the base. On July 27 friends, family, and the public at large came to watch as the team practiced under a hot, sun-drenched afternoon in the city centre of Den Helder.

== Men's 2006 World Championship campaign ==
The Netherlands competed in their first World Lacrosse Championships in 2006 in London, Ontario, Canada. Led by a contingent of Dutch ex-pats from North America. These players included many ex (NLL)(WLA) pro players, Jonas Derks (NLL from 1998-2008) bolstered the Dutch attack, Aaron Vanderhorst (WLA 2000-2015) was noted in the midfield, Vanderhorst is on track to have competed in every World Championshil, since 2006. He will be donning the Orange of the Dutch in the 2019 World Indoor championships. Well former UWO Mustang standout Andrew Dowdell (Major series 2000, NLL 2001) locked down the goaltending position, he was also tooted as a player to watch throughout the games, according to official program. Dowdell had suffered a shortened NLL and Major career as a result of head Injuries. Despite, his past head injuries Dowdell was rock solid in the cage for the Dutch. The Dutch national team finished with a 3-4 record at the tournament. They also made ILF history by becoming the first team to win their debut game at their first World Championships (defeating South Korea by a score of 12-4).

The Netherlands competed in the Orange Group, featuring Germany, the Czech Republic, New Zealand, and South Korea. Competing against these countries in round-robin play, the Dutch group amassed a 2-2 record, with convincing wins over both South Korea and New Zealand. The Netherlands then went on to beat Latvia (10-4) before falling to Finland in a tightly-fought and controversial 2 goal game (final score: 8-10). The group went on to lose their last game to a talented Scotland squad, but finished the tournament in 12th place (out of 21 countries).

=== Game results ===
The Netherlands played 7 games in 8 days, all at the North London Athletic Fields. The game results are listed below.

Date	Opponent	Score
Friday, July 14, 2006	South Korea	W, 12-4
Sunday, July 16, 2006	Germany	L, 9-15
Monday, July 17, 2006	New Zealand	W, 15-4
Tuesday, July 18, 2006	Czech Republic	L, 9-19
Wednesday, July 19, 2006	Latvia	W, 10-4
Thursday, July 20, 2006	Finland	L, 10-8
Friday, July 21, 2006	Scotland	L, 3-15

=== Team organization ===
The staff, led by General Manager Cornelius Derks, was composed entirely of North American coaches during the 2006 tournament. Corny, a native of Oshawa, Ontario, performed managerial duties while David Leich (head coach of the University of Western Ontario Mustangs), Jason Crosbie (standout player from the Buffalo Bandits of the NLL), and Jim Huelskamp (Former Salisbury State University All-American) acted as assistant coaches.

Waterford Development (a Washington D.C.–based real estate developer) was the team's main sponsor. Exclusive partnerships with lacrosse equipment and apparel suppliers were formed: STX (based out of Baltimore, Maryland) provided the team with equipment while Riddell supplied the team with helmets. Atlantic Sportswear provided apparel for the Netherlands and the team was outfitted in their famous "Orange" colors.
