= 2010 World Lacrosse Championship =

Tournament details
- Host country: England
- Venue(s): Armitage Center, Manchester
- Dates: 15–24 July
- Teams: 29

Final positions
- Champions: United States (9th title)
- Runners-up: Canada
- Third place: Australia
- Fourth place: Japan

Tournament statistics
- Games played: 101
- Goals scored: 2,062 (20.42 per game)

Awards
- MVP: (United States) Paul Rabil

The 2010 World Lacrosse Championship was held between 15–24 July. This international men's field lacrosse tournament organized by the Federation of International Lacrosse took place in Manchester, United Kingdom. This was the third time that the tournament was played in Greater Manchester, after the 1978 and 1994 championships.

The United States captured their ninth gold medal, defeating Canada 12–10 in the championship game. Paul Rabil of Team USA was named tournament MVP. Australia earned its fourth-straight bronze medal by defeating Japan 16 –9.

A record 29 nations competed at the event, eight more than the 2006 WLC in London, Ontario. The 101 games were held at the Armitage Centre, Manchester University's sports grounds.

For the first time, a FIL World Lacrosse Festival ran alongside the world championships from 17 to 22 July. 48 teams from around the world competed in 8 divisions from U16 to Grand Masters.

== Iroquois passport controversy ==
The Iroquois Nationals' participation in the championships was prevented in a dispute over their passports. The team sought to travel on Haudenosaunee passports, but the United Kingdom government would not allow it because of increased passport security requirements. The United States Department of State initially also refused to allow the passports, but later granted the team a one-time waiver to travel to the tournament. However, the U.K. would not issue the team visas.

Initially, the Iroquois were hoping to be able to travel, and agreed to forfeit their first game against England. Because it was the opening game of the tournament, organizers arranged for the host team to play Germany in an exhibition match instead. However, just before game time, the FIL decided to move Germany to the Blue Division and the Iroquois to the Plum Division, making the England-Germany match an official one. The Iroquois team did not officially withdraw from the tournament, and would have been allowed to play its remaining games should it have resolved its passport difficulties in time. On 18 July, the FIL announced that the competition schedule had progressed too far to allow Iroquois to compete in the tournament. Each of the other three Plum Division teams were given 1–0 forfeit victories over the Iroquois team.

== Pool play ==
For pool play, nations were separated into seven divisions according to strength, the top six teams were placed in the Blue Division, and the other teams were put in six divisions of four. Each of the thirty nations were eligible to win the championship. Each division played round-robin games for ranking to determine which tournament brackets they would be placed in.

=== Blue Division ===
The Blue Division originally consisted of the top six teams from the 2006 World Lacrosse Championship, but Germany was moved up to replace the missing Iroquois team. The first and second place teams from the Blue Division advanced to the tournament semifinals. The third and fourth place teams advanced to the quarterfinals. The fifth and sixth place teams were placed into the 5th through 8th place classification bracket.

Canada's 10–9 win over the United States marked the first time that the American team lost a preliminary round game in any world championship, and only its third loss overall. Both teams ended up advancing to the semifinals.

Japan, Australia, and England all finished 2–3 in the Blue Division and 1–1 in head-to-head matches against each other. All three games between the teams were close, with two going into overtime. Japan and Australia advanced to the quarterfinals based on goal differential in those matches.

| Pos | Team | Pld | W | L | GF | GA | GD | Qualification |
|---|---|---|---|---|---|---|---|---|
| 1 | Canada | 5 | 5 | 0 | 86 | 28 | +58 | Advanced to semifinals |
| 2 | United States | 5 | 4 | 1 | 88 | 29 | +59 | Advanced to semifinals |
| 3 | Japan | 5 | 2 (Note: Goal differential in matches between tied teams: Japan +1; Australia 0; England −1) | 3 | 47 | 67 | −20 | Advanced to quarterfinals |
| 4 | Australia | 5 | 2 | 3 | 51 | 63 | −12 | Advanced to quarterfinals |
| 5 | England | 5 | 2 | 3 | 44 | 59 | −15 | Advanced to 5th–8th place games |
| 6 | Germany | 5 | 0 | 5 | 24 | 96 | −72 | Advanced to 5th–8th place games |

Notes:

15 July 2010
| England | 12–3 | Germany |
16 July 2010
| Canada | 17–4 | Japan |
| United States | 21–5 | Australia |
17 July 2010
| Japan | 15–9 | Germany |
| Australia | 10–8 (OT) | England |
| United States | 9–10 | Canada |
18 July 2010
| England | 13–12 (OT) | Japan |
| Germany | 4–22 | United States |
| Canada | 19–5 | Australia |
19 July 2010
| Germany | 4–23 | Canada |
| Australia | 9–11 | Japan |
| United States | 17–5 | England |
20 July 2010
| Japan | 5–19 | United States |
| Australia | 22–4 | Germany |
| Canada | 17–6 | England |

Key to colours in division tables
Six division winners and top two runners-up
advanced to the upper bracket
Four remaining runners-up and top four third-placed teams
advanced to the middle bracket
Two remaining third-placed teams and six last placed teams
advanced to the lower bracket

=== Orange Division ===
| Pos | Team | Pld | W | L | GF | GA | GD | Qualification |
|---|---|---|---|---|---|---|---|---|
| 1 | Ireland | 3 | 3 | 0 | 60 | 10 | +50 | Semifinals |
| 2 | Slovakia | 3 | 2 | 1 | 21 | 33 | −12 | Quarterfinals |
| 3 | Switzerland | 3 | 1 | 2 | 15 | 32 | −17 | Quarterfinals |
| 4 | South Korea | 3 | 0 | 3 | 15 | 38 | −23 | 5th–8th place |

16 July 2010
| Slovakia | 10–4 | Switzerland |
| Ireland (Republic of Ireland) | 21–3 | South Korea |
17 July 2010
| Switzerland | 10–6 | South Korea |
| Slovakia | 4–23 | Ireland |
18 July 2010
| South Korea | 6–7 | Slovakia |
| Switzerland | 3–16 | Ireland |

=== Plum Division ===
| Pos | Team | Pld | W | L | GF | GA | GD | Qualification |
|---|---|---|---|---|---|---|---|---|
| 1 | Spain | 3 | 3 | 0 | 28 | 22 | +6 | Semifinals |
| 2 | Hong Kong | 3 | 2 | 1 | 25 | 24 | +1 | Quarterfinals |
| 3 | Norway | 3 | 1 | 2 | 17 | 21 | −4 | Quarterfinals |
| 4 | Haudenosaunee | 3 | 0 | 3 | 0 | 3 | −3 | 5th–8th place |

16 July 2010
| Haudenosaunee | 0–1 | Spain |
| Hong Kong | 10–8 | Norway |
17 July 2010
| Norway | 8–11 | Spain |
| Hong Kong | 1–0 | Haudenosaunee |
18 July 2010
| Norway | 1–0 | Haudenosaunee |
| Spain | 16–14 | Hong Kong |

- Iroquois forfeited their three games due to not being able to travel to the tournament.

=== Yellow Division ===
| Pos | Team | Pld | W | L | GF | GA | GD | Qualification |
|---|---|---|---|---|---|---|---|---|
| 1 | Finland | 3 | 3 | 0 | 37 | 18 | +19 | Semifinals |
| 2 | Poland | 3 | 2 | 1 | 42 | 19 | +23 | Quarterfinals |
| 3 | Bermuda | 3 | 1 | 2 | 18 | 35 | −17 | Quarterfinals |
| 4 | Denmark | 3 | 0 | 3 | 15 | 40 | −25 | 5th–8th place |

16 July 2010
| Bermuda | 2–16 | Poland |
| Finland | 14–2 | Denmark |
17 July 2010
| Poland | 15–5 | Denmark |
| Bermuda | 5–11 | Finland |
18 July 2010
| Poland | 11–12 (OT) | Finland |
| Denmark | 8–11 | Bermuda |

=== Red Division ===
| Pos | Team | Pld | W | L | GF | GA | GD | Qualification |
|---|---|---|---|---|---|---|---|---|
| 1 | Czech Republic | 3 | 3 | 0 | 47 | 10 | +37 | Semifinals |
| 2 | Sweden | 3 | 2 | 1 | 42 | 14 | +28 | Semifinals |
| 3 | Italy | 3 | 1 | 2 | 18 | 36 | −18 | 5th–8th place |
| 4 | Mexico | 3 | 0 | 3 | 6 | 53 | −47 | 5th–8th place |

16 July 2010
| Italy | 3–17 | Czech Republic |
| Sweden | 20–2 | Mexico |
17 July 2010
| Sweden | 16–3 | Italy |
| Mexico | 1–21 | Czech Republic |
18 July 2010
| Mexico | 3–12 | Italy |
| Czech Republic | 9–6 | Sweden |

=== Turquoise Division ===
| Pos | Team | Pld | W | L | GF | GA | GD | Qualification |
|---|---|---|---|---|---|---|---|---|
| 1 | Scotland | 3 | 3 | 0 | 57 | 14 | +43 | Semifinals |
| 2 | New Zealand | 3 | 2 | 1 | 37 | 26 | +11 | Quarterfinals |
| 3 | Latvia | 3 | 1 | 2 | 25 | 37 | −12 | Quarterfinals |
| 4 | France | 3 | 0 | 3 | 11 | 53 | −42 | 5th–8th place |

16 July 2010
| New Zealand | 18–3 | France |
| Scotland | 20–4 | Latvia |
17 July 2010
| New Zealand | 8–18 | Scotland |
| France | 6–16 | Latvia |
18 July 2010
| France | 2–19 | Scotland |
| Latvia | 5–11 | New Zealand |

=== Grey Division ===
| Pos | Team | Pld | W | L | GF | GA | GD | Qualification |
|---|---|---|---|---|---|---|---|---|
| 1 | Wales | 3 | 3 | 0 | 49 | 12 | +37 | Semifinals |
| 2 | Netherlands | 3 | 2 | 1 | 55 | 18 | +37 | Semifinals |
| 3 | Austria | 3 | 1 | 2 | 21 | 41 | −20 | 5th–8th place |
| 4 | Argentina | 3 | 0 | 3 | 11 | 65 | −54 | 5th–8th place |

16 July 2010
| Argentina | 5–16 | Austria |
| Netherlands | 9–10 | Wales |
17 July 2010
| Argentina | 3–29 | Netherlands |
| Austria | 0–19 | Wales |
18 July 2010
| Wales | 20–3 | Argentina |
| Austria | 5–17 | Netherlands |

== Intermediate Round ==
Starting on 19 July, all teams except for the Blue Division moved to one of three intermediate brackets: either the upper, middle, or lower bracket.

=== Upper bracket ===
The upper bracket included the six first-place finishers from each division as well as the top two second-place finishers. These teams were still eligible for the World Championship and could have finished anywhere from 1st to 16th in the tournament. By winning two games in the upper bracket, Scotland and Netherlands advanced to the quarterfinals.

July 19
Czech Republic | 14
Scotland | 17
Ireland | 12
Sweden | 7

July 20
Scotland | 15
Ireland | 9
Third place
Czech Republic | 8
Sweden | 15

July 19
Finland | 7
Wales | 9
Netherlands | 16
Spain | 1

July 20
Wales | 8
Netherlands | 9
Third place
Finland | 21
Spain | 4

=== Middle bracket ===
The middle bracket included the remaining four second-place finishers and the top four third-place finishers. These teams could have finished anywhere from 9th to 24th in the final rankings.

19 July
Switzerland | 3
New Zealand | 11
Hong Kong | 10
Latvia | 12

20 July
New Zealand | 16
Latvia | 3
Third place
20 July – 12:30
Switzerland | 11
Hong Kong | 7

19 July
Norway | 4
Slovakia | 14
Poland | 14
Bermuda | 10

20 July
Slovakia | 6
Poland | 11
Third place
Norway | 4
Bermuda | 8

=== Lower bracket ===
The lower bracket included the remaining two third-place finishers and the six fourth-place finishers. These teams could have finished no higher than 17th in the final rankings.

19 July
Mexico | 9
South Korea | 10
France | 4
Austria | 15

20 July
South Korea | 8
Austria | 13
Third place
Mexico | 6
France | 10

19 July
Denmark
Bye
Italy | 13
Argentina | 9

20 July
Denmark | 3
Italy | 10
Third place
Argentina

== Play-in games ==
On 21 July, Finland beat Poland 13–7 to advance to the 9th–12th place bracket, sending Poland to the 13th–16th place bracket. Italy beat Switzerland 7–6 to advance to the 17th–20th place bracket, while Switzerland entered the 21st–24th place bracket.

== Championship bracket ==
Quarterfinals; 21 July
Australia | 20
Scotland | 11
Japan | 14
Netherlands | 8

Semifinals; 22 July
Canada | 15
Australia | 6
United States | 20
Japan | 5

Gold medal game 24 July
Canada | 10
United States | 12
Bronze medal game
Australia | 16
Japan | 9

== Classification brackets ==
=== 5th to 8th place ===
22 July
England | 23
Scotland | 9
Germany | 14
Netherlands | 1

5th place
England | 14
Germany | 9
7th place
Scotland | 11
Netherlands | 10

=== 9th to 12th place ===
22 July
Wales | 5
Sweden | 9
Ireland | 17
Finland | 6

9th place
Sweden | 8
Ireland | 15
11th place
Wales | 10
Finland | 5

=== 13th to 16th place ===
22 July
Spain | 11
Poland | 15
New Zealand | 8
Czech Republic | 13

13th place
Poland | 3
Czech Republic | 21
15th place
Spain | 5
New Zealand | 23

=== 17th to 20th place ===
22 July
Latvia | 7
Bermuda | 8
Slovakia | 10
Italy | 4

17th place
Bermuda | 7
Slovakia | 12
19th place
Latvia | 8
Italy | 13

=== 21st to 24th place ===
22 July
Austria | 10
Norway | 4
Hong Kong | 15
Switzerland | 8

21st place
Austria | 9
Hong Kong | 8
23rd place
Norway | 0
Switzerland | 2

=== 25th to 28th place ===
22 July
South Korea | 16
Argentina | 5
France | 7
Denmark | 9

25th place
South Korea | 12
Denmark | 10
27th place
Argentina | 8
France | 10

== Final standings ==
| Rank | Team | Record |
|---|---|---|
| 1st place, gold medalist(s) | United States | 6–1 |
| 2nd place, silver medalist(s) | Canada | 6–1 |
| 3rd place, bronze medalist(s) | Australia | 4–4 |
| 4 | Japan | 3–5 |
| 5 | England | 4–3 |
| 6 | Germany | 1–6 |
| 7 | Scotland | 6–2 |
| 8 | Netherlands | 5–3 |
| 9 | Ireland | 6–1 |
| 10 | Sweden | 4–3 |
| 11 | Wales | 5–2 |
| 12 | Finland | 5–3 |
| 13 | Czech Republic | 5–2 |
| 14 | Poland | 5–3 |
| 15 | New Zealand | 5–2 |
| 16 | Spain | 3–4 |
| 17 | Slovakia | 5–2 |
| 18 | Bermuda | 3–4 |
| 19 | Italy | 5–3 |
| 20 | Latvia | 2–5 |
| 21 | Austria | 5–2 |
| 22 | Hong Kong | 3–4 |
| 23 | Switzerland | 3–5 |
| 24 | Norway | 1–6 |
| 25 | South Korea | 3–4 |
| 26 | Denmark | 1–5 |
| 27 | France | 2–5 |
| 28 | Argentina | 0–6 |
| 29 | Mexico | 0–5 |
| – | Haudenosaunee | 0–3 |

== Awards ==
=== All World Team ===
The Federation of International Lacrosse named an All World Team at the conclusion of the championship, along with four other individual awards.

Goalkeeper

(Canada) Chris Sanderson

Defence

(Canada) Brodie Merrill
(United States) Ryan McClay
(United States) Kyle Sweeney

Midfield

(United States) Paul Rabil
(United States) Max Seibald
(Australia) Leigh Perham

Attack

(Canada) John Grant, Jr.
(United States) Brendan Mundorf
(United States) Mike Leveille

=== Best Positional Players ===
(Canada) Chris Sanderson - Goalkeeper
(Canada) Brodie Merrill - Defence
(United States) Paul Rabil - Midfield
(Canada) John Grant, Jr. - Attack

=== Tournament MVP ===
(United States) Paul Rabil - Midfield

== See also ==
- World Lacrosse, the unified governing body for world lacrosse
- World Lacrosse Championship
- Field lacrosse
