= Bermuda Lacrosse Association =

National sporting body

- Sport: Lacrosse
- Jurisdiction: National
- Founded: 2002
- Affiliation: World Lacrosse
- Affiliation date: 2006
- Regional affiliation: Pan-American Lacrosse Association

Official website
- bermudalax.com
- (Bermuda)

The Bermuda Lacrosse Association is a group based on the island of Bermuda with the goal of promoting the sport of lacrosse on the island territory. The Bermuda Lacrosse Association is a member of the Federation of International Lacrosse and has participated at two previous World Championships, the 2006 World Lacrosse Championships in London, Ontario, Canada and the 2008 International Lacrosse Federation Under-19 World Lacrosse Championships in Coquitlam, British Columbia, Canada.

The Bermuda Lacrosse Association has been a registered charity in Bermuda since 2006 and is recognised by the Department of Youth and Sport in Bermuda.

== Foundation ==
Lacrosse in Bermuda has its foundations in the 1980s and 1990s when US high school and collegiate teams visited the island during spring break to participate in training camps and tournaments in the warmer winter climate prior to spring leagues.

The current form of the Bermuda Lacrosse Association has its foundational roots in 2002 when a Bermudian, Kirk Bridgewater and two expatriates American Andy Soucie and Canadian Ernie Theriault got together and attempted to bring together a recreational game of lacrosse on the island. Initial pick-up games were played at Bernard Park with any available equipment on the island, including a batch of sticks donated by a Canadian box lacrosse team. Equipment was so sparse on the island that initially the goals consisted of garbage cans and parking gate fences until nets were constructed from PVC pipe and fishing net, items readily available on the island. For the first two years due to a lack of players and equipment, games were played with one net reverting to teams clearing and turning around to attack the same goal.

Once membership began to pick up, games were moved to Prospect Field (aka. Gymnasium Field) next to National Stadium as the location was better suited to collecting errant shots. Proper equipment was shipped in from the United States but due to a lack of goaltenders, goals were often draped in "shooter tutors".

In 2004, the first ever Tri-Nations tournament would be held with three local teams, representing Bermuda, Canada and the United States (based upon the player's place of origin) was held with Canada winning the initial tournament. This tournament has been held twice yearly since with the United States facing Canada in every final and the United States coming out on top. In 2008, Bermuda Lacrosse expanded to include the "King of the Rock" tournament open to post-collegiate teams from outside of Bermuda.

== International Lacrosse ==
In 2005, Bermuda Lacrosse made the decision to attempt to improve its program by participating in tournaments outside of Bermuda. One of its members, Evan Schemenauer with previous experience in organising Bermudian teams to play internationally made contact with the International Lacrosse Federation about potential membership and participation in the 2006 World Lacrosse Championships. With a favorable response from the ILF, Bermuda Lacrosse began its long road towards the World Championships. With only a small talent pool to choose from, the Bermuda team consisted of players ranging from ages 17 to 51. The team composed of players which most everyone resided on the island of Bermuda.

The team was placed in the Yellow group alongside Finland, Denmark, Spain and Latvia. Bermuda lost each game, 10-6 versus Denmark, 16-3 versus Finland, 13-9 versus Spain and 9-3 versus Latvia. This left Bermuda fifth in the group and played New Zealand in the playoff round, losing 19-6 and finishing the tournament in 21st and last place. Despite finishing last, Bermuda Lacrosse made a lasting impression on the ILF through team spirit wearing their traditional blue blazers and red Bermuda shorts which have become a custom at all ILF/FIL events.

=== World Under 19 Championships ===
Bermuda made its first appearance at the 2008 International Lacrosse Federation Under-19 World Lacrosse Championships in Coquitlam, British Columbia, Canada. The team that represented Bermuda consisted mostly of Bermudian resident students that were attending boarding schools in the United States, Canada and England where they had learned to play the game. Bermuda was placed in the Red Division alongside Finland, Wales, Germany, Scotland and South Korea. Bermuda opened with a win over Finland 11-5 and a win over Wales 6-5. Bermuda then lost to the top team in the division Germany 15-7 making for a decisive game against Scotland for the right for promotion. An 8-7 third quarter lead evaporated as Bermuda fell 13-8 to Scotland, eliminating Bermuda from contention for the play-in games and a top 8 finish. Bermuda concluded the round robin with an 8-4 victory over South Korea. In the play-off round, Bermuda beat Finland 5-4 to advance to the 9th place game, where they fell 8-3 in the rematch with Wales to finish 10th overall.

Bermuda recently completed in the 2010 World Lacrosse Championships in Manchester, England. The team was placed in the Yellow Division with Poland, Denmark and Finland. The Barracuda's opened play with back to back losses: a 2-16 match with Poland and a 5-11 outcome against Finland. They then turned in a strong 11-8 victory against Denmark to finish pool play. The squad started the Qualifying competition in a rematch with Poland, falling in a closely contested 14-10 loss. They bounced back with an impressive 8-4 victory over Norway. This win placed Bermuda in the playoffs with against a very physical Latvia, with Bermuda prevailing in an 8-7 victory. They concluded play with a 12-7 loss to Slovakia, ending the Championships in 18th place with a 3-4 record.

== Team Colours ==
Bermuda Lacrosse has adopted a logo of a barracuda with a large snarling face holding a lacrosse stick. The team colours are Green, Orange and White, with one jersey predominantly white and one predominantly green.

== King of de Rock Tournament ==
Starting in 2008, in partnership with the Bermuda Department of Tourism, the Bermuda Lacrosse Association held an annual King of de Rock Tournament. The tournament now occurs each September Labour Day weekend. The inaugural champions were team MacWear, with Fat Rhinos winning in 2009. The tournament has featured prominent professional lacrosse players such as Zack Greer and Rodney Tapp.

== Women's and Youth Lacrosse ==
In addition to the international efforts listed above, Bermuda Lacrosse has expanded to include a women's development program and a youth program at Bermuda High School for girls. The first competitive women's game was played on November 23, 2008 as a part of the Tri-Nations tournament.
