= England men's national lacrosse team =

National sports team

England
- Association: English Lacrosse Association
- Confederation: ELF (Europe)
- Head coach: Sam Patterson

World Championship
- Appearances: 13 (first in 1967)
- Website: www.englandlacrosse.co.uk
Medal record
European Lacrosse Championships
Gold medal – first place	1995
Gold medal – first place	1996
Gold medal – first place	1997
Gold medal – first place	1999 Manchester
Gold medal – first place	2000 Glasgow
Silver medal – second place	2001 Cardiff
Gold medal – first place	2004 Prague
Gold medal – first place	2008 Lahti
Gold medal – first place	2012 Amsterdam
Gold medal – first place	2016 Budapest

The England men's national lacrosse team is one of the premier national teams in Europe and the world having competed at every World Lacrosse Championship since its inception in 1967 and having won all but one of the European Lacrosse Championships. Currently the team is ranked 5th in the world. The team is governed by England Lacrosse which has been a full member of World Lacrosse since 1972.

== History ==
The England men's national team has played in every World Lacrosse Championship since 1967, earning a silver medal in 1974. The last world championship to be held in England was the 2010 World Lacrosse Championship, in Manchester, England, where they placed 5th. The men's team has competed in the European Lacrosse Championship since 1995 and has won nine gold medals.

== Current roster ==
=== 2023 World Lacrosse Championship ===
Player	Position	NCAA
Will Baxter	Goalie	Limestone '22
Hal Dwobeng	Goalie	
Andrew Baxter	Defense	
Eric Coburn	Defense	Marquette University '18
Tom Hallam	Defense	
Tommy Kirkland	Defense	
Josh Poke	Defense	Queens '24
Daniel Smith	Defense	
Jak Wawrzyniak	Defense	Providence '14
Joe Baythorpe	Midfield	
Tom Bracegirdle	Midfield	
Tim Collins	Midfield	Mount Olive '21
Sam Dexter	Midfield	
Daniel Jones	Midfield	High Point '25
Daniel Madeley	Midfield	
Cameron Major	Midfield	
Michael Pomfret	Midfield	
Christian Scarpello	Midfield	Rutgers '18
Drew Bickerton	Attack	
Nick DeCaprio	Attack	Michigan University '19
Sean Goldsmith	Attack	North Carolina '23
Danny Hilditch	Attack	
Dan Watson	Attack	

=== 2018 FIL World Championship ===
The following 23 players made up the roster at the 2018 World Lacrosse Championship.

Player	#	Position	Club Team	NCAA College
William Baxter	20	Goalie	Poynton LC	
Hal Dwobeng	1	Goalie	Brooklands LC	
Andrew Baxter	24	Defender	Stockport LC	
Alister Berven	88	Defender	Oxford University LC	Princeton University '17
Joshua Hurry	3	Defender	Heaton Mersey LC	
Tommy Kirkland	25	Defender	Timperley LC	
Daniel Smith	4	Defender	Cheadle LC	
Thomas Brooks	8	FO/LSM	Poynton LC	Whittier '12
Sam Patterson	26	LSM	Stockport LC	
Jak Wawrzyniak	10	LSM	Heaton Mersey LC	Providence '14
Thomas Bracegirdle	21	FO/SSDM	Timperley LC	
Tim Collins	30	Midfield	Brooklands LC	Mount Olive '21
Zachary Guy	61	Midfield	Heaton Mersey LC	Georgetown '14
Peter Hayes	15	Midfield	Heaton Mersey LC	
William Hardy	22	Midfield	Poynton LC	
Sam Russell	6	Midfield	Poynton LC	Whittier '11
Christian Scarpello	14	Midfield		Rutgers '18
Joshua Sherry-Brennan	16	Midfield	Stockport LC	
Ryan Sweetman	17	Midfield	Brooklands LC	
Ryan Hunns	7	Attack	Heaton Mersey LC	
Alex Russell	5	Attack	Poynton LC	LIU Post '20
James Yanes	19	Attack		Hofstra '20
Nick Watson	2	Attack	Cheadle LC	Adelphi '14
