= Turkey Lacrosse Association =

National sports body in Turkey

- Sport: Lacrosse
- Jurisdiction: National
- Founded: October 1, 2009 by Patrick Dougherty
- Affiliation: Federation of International Lacrosse and European Lacrosse Federation
- Headquarters: Istanbul and New York City
- Chairman: Ryan Danehy
- Other key staff: Ryan Danehy (Board Chairman, Executive Director, Treasurer), Deniz Piatt (Board member, Deputy Executive Director), Ömer Faruk Yetiştirici

Official website
- www.turkeylacrosse.com
- (Turkey)

Turkey Lacrosse Association (TLA) is a non-profit organization formed to educate and disseminate information on the sport of lacrosse in Turkey and globally. The association also provides financial support for the sport in Turkey, including funding and managing Turkey's national teams.

Represented by TLA, Turkey is the first predominantly Muslim country to play lacrosse competitively and to be a member of the Federation of International Lacrosse and the European Lacrosse Federation.

== Men's national field team ==
In 2014 World Lacrosse Championship, in the team's first appearance at the World Lacrosse Championships, Turkey placed 22nd.

== Men's national indoor team ==
In 2015, in its first appearance at the 2015 World Indoor Lacrosse Championships. Turkey placed 10th.
