= Scotland men's national lacrosse team =

Scotland
- Association: Lacrosse Scotland
- Confederation: ELF (Europe)
- Head coach: Matt Bagley

World Championship
- Appearances: 7 (first in 1998)

The Scotland national men's lacrosse team is governed by Lacrosse Scotland and is currently coached by Matt Bagley (2023 WC). Previous coaches include Graham Farrall (1994 WC), Lee Wilkinson (1996 EC), Phil Collier (1998 WC, 1999 EC, 2002 WC), Phil Moore (2000 EC), John Robinson (2001 EC), Keith Langdale (2006 WC), John Kenney (2008 EC, 2010 WC, 2012 EC, 2014 WC), and Brian Silcott (2016 EC, 2018 WC).

== History ==
Prior to the Lockerbie air disaster in December 1988, the men's game had not been represented in Scotland since the turn of the 20th century. The tragedy of Pan Am Flight 103 saw many Syracuse University students perish and on a memorial visit one year later the University's lacrosse team were surprised that there was no Scotland national men's team for them to compete against. The country was challenged to pull together an inaugural and bona fide team; this was achieved some eight months later and following the 1990 World Championships the men's team played their first representative match. Scotland has now played memorial games against Syracuse during visits to Lockerbie to pay their respects to those lost in the air disaster, and hope this fixture will continue into the future.

The 1994 World Series was a showcase for the sport and an opportunity for Scotland to make its name on the World stage. Scotland wanted people in Scotland to hear more about the sport and encourage participation through the existing British Lacrosse Development Program. The development game, Pop Lacrosse, a mixed sport played in schools, is still growing at an extreme rate. During 1997 through to 1998, Pop Lacrosse was introduced to nearly 100 schools in the Fife, Lothian, SW Region, Perthshire, Tayside, Central and Strathclyde areas. The numbers of players coached was in excess of 10,000 and the number of PE teachers educated in coaching was nearly 250.

Since that time Scotland have been represented at every European and World Championships held. Scotland have ranked 3rd in Europe and 6th in the World Championships.

== World Lacrosse Championships ==
=== 2014 ===
This was the second World Championships with Head Coach John Kenney at helm, after an impressive 7th placed finish in 2010. Scotland were placed in the White Division and won all 3 pool games, scoring 61 goals in the process, and advanced to play Finland in the play-in games. Scotland overcame Finland and then New Zealand to advance into the quarter-finals. A narrow defeat to the Iroqouis (10-8) saw Scotland face-off against Japan, with a place in the elite Blue Division at stake. After two periods of over time, Scotland took the victory (9-8). The final game of the tournament pitched the Scots against their rivals England in a fierce game that ended with another narrow defeat (15-13). Despite this narrow loss Scotland still finished in 6th place overall and will compete in the Blue Division in 2018.

=== 2010 ===
In the 2010 World Lacrosse Championship, Scotland was in the Turquoise Division. They won their division with a 3-0 record, and finished with an overall record of 6-2, earning them a 7th-place finish overall. Game results were as follows:

Winning team	Losing team	Score
Scotland	Latvia	20-4
Scotland	New Zealand	18-8
Scotland	France	19-2
Scotland	Czech Republic	17-14
Scotland	Ireland	15-9
Australia	Scotland	20-11
England	Scotland	23-9
Scotland	Netherlands	11-10

=== Roster ===
Name	Position	Height	Weight	Date of birth	Home team
Thomas Barker	Midfield	179 cm	76 kg	10 Apr 1985	Sheffield Steelers
Myles Bonnar	Attack	183 cm	80 kg	6 Nov 1987	Stirling Uni.
Jordan Coffey	Attack	182 cm	83 kg	2 Apr 1987	Ajax Rock
Stuart Craig	Midfield	190 cm	82 kg	20 Mar 1987	Wilmslow
Nicholas Duncan-Price	Midfield	180 cm	80 kg	21 Sep 1979	University of Bath
Jesse Fehr	Attack	183 cm	88 kg	29 Apr 1987	Harvard University
Douglas Freeman	Defence	188 cm	99 kg	6 Jan 1983	Ohio Weselyan Uni.
Dave Gill	Midfield	180 cm	76 kg	13 Nov 1990	Loughborough Uni.
Ethan Harris	Goalie	171 cm	78 kg	20 Apr 1981	UMBC
Brendan Healy	Midfield	180 cm	81 kg	8 Apr 1984	Maryland Uni.
Ian Healy	Attack	170 cm	82 kg	12 Jan 1981	Maryland Uni.
Dan Heighway	Attack	185 cm	78 kg	15 Aug 1980	Heaton Mersey
Richard Heighway	Midfield	180 cm	77 kg	19 May 1986	Heaton Mersey
Robert Hetherington	Defence	190 cm	94 kg	23 Nov 1987	Stirling University
Timo Higgins	Goalie	183 cm	88 kg	8 Sep 1988	St. Andrews Uni.
James Huntington	Midfield	188 cm	82 kg	1 Oct 1986	Stirling University
Troy Kachor	Midfield	180 cm	75 kg	11 Sep 1988	Calgary Mountaineers
Malcolm Kent	Midfield	178 cm	73 kg	8 Dec 1988	Stirling University
Tommy Kirkland	Defence	181 cm	76 kg	10 June 1991	Timperley
Conor McLaughlin	Defence	175 cm	73 kg	20 June 1991	Muhlenberg College
Julian MacMillan	Midfield	175 cm	84 kg	20 Apr 1987	Saint Leo Uni.
Rory Marsden	Defence	192 cm	89 kg	5 Dec 1981	Stirling University
Graham Monaghan	Attack	185 cm	75 kg	5 Sep 1989	Sussex Uni.
Quentin Morgan	LSM	153 cm	77 kg	13 Apr 1988	St. Andrews Uni.
Chris Paton	Attack	175 cm	94 kg	18 Oct 1987	Glasgow Uni.
Michael Rushworth	Defence	180 cm	110 kg	29 May 1988	Aberdeen Uni.
James Slade	Midfield	180 cm	81 kg	18 May 1985	Western Ontario Uni.
Calum Watson	Defence	183 cm	83 kg	12 Dec 1981	Manchester Uni.

=== 2006 ===
In the 2006 World Lacrosse Championship, Scotland was in the "red division", i.e. the second tier. Results were as follows:

Winning team	Losing team	Score
Scotland	Italy	13–12
Scotland	Wales	7–3
Ireland	Scotland	16–9
Scotland	Hong Kong	21–3

Red division standings after the round-robin phase of the tournament were:

1. Ireland
2. Scotland
3. Italy
4. Wales
5. Hong Kong

=== Finals ===
With the nations ranked amongst their division, they played off for their final standings. The winner from each lower group played a lower-ranked nation from Blue division for their shot at the championship. Scotland's results were as follows:

Winning team	Losing team	Score
Italy	Scotland	10–7
Scotland	Netherlands	15–3

The final standings were:

1. Canada
2. USA
3. Australia
4. Iroquois Nation
5. England
6. Japan
7. Ireland
8. Germany
9. Finland
10. Italy
11. Scotland
12. Netherlands
13. Wales
14. Latvia
15. Czech Republic
16. Denmark
17. Spain
18. South Korea
19. New Zealand
20. Hong Kong
21. Bermuda

== European Lacrosse Championships ==
Scotland has been represented in every European Championship, dating back to the very first one in 1995 in Prague–Plzeň, Czech Republic. In the last played games in 2016, Scotland finished 8th out of 24 participating countries.

Year	Location	Place
2016	Gödöllő (Budapest)	8th
2012	Amsterdam	6th
2008	Lahti	9th
2004	Prague	3rd
2001	Cardiff	4th
2000	Glasgow	3rd
1999	Manchester	3rd
1997	Stockholm	6th
1996	Düsseldorf	3rd
1995	Prague–Plzeň	4th

== National Box Lacrosse team ==
The Scotland national indoor lacrosse team was reformed in 2018 through the generation of a domestic box lacrosse league and is currently managed by Brendan Cook (general manager), Brian Witmer (head coach) and Navi Mahal (assistant coach). The team will be participating in the World Indoor Lacrosse Championships 2019.

== Under-19 team ==
Scotland made their first appearance in the Men's Under-19 World Lacrosse Championships during the 2008 tournament. The team placed eighth overall out of twelve competing nations.
