= Czech Lacrosse Union =

Governing body of lacrosse in the Czech Republic

- Sport: lacrosse
- Jurisdiction: Czech Republic
- Abbreviation: ČLU
- Founded: 2004
- Affiliation: WL
- Headquarters: Prague, Czech Republic
- Location: Zátopkova 100/2, 160 17, Prague 6, Czech Republic
- President: Roman Pokorný

Official website
- www.lacrosse.cz
- (Czech Republic)

The Czech Lacrosse Union (Czech: Česká lakrosová unie) is the governing body of lacrosse in the Czech Republic. It conducts national junior and senior championship tournaments for men and women in field lacrosse, box lacrosse and intercrosse. The Czech Lacrosse Union sends national teams at the World Indoor Lacrosse Championship, World Lacrosse Championship and Women's Lacrosse World Cup in senior and junior categories.

The Czech Republic is a founding member of European Lacrosse Federation (ELF) and Czech Lacrosse Union has sent a national teams (men’s and women’s, senior and junior) to all European Lacrosse Championships that has been held since 1995 when the European competition started.

history of the game of lacrosse in the Czech Republic (Czechoslovakia)

The history of the game of lacrosse in the Czech Republic has two points that one could call the beginning of lacrosse. The first one falls back to 1967 when a local Rover Scout “tribe” named Neskenon inspired by life of Native Americans organized first ever lacrosse tournament among the tribe’s clans. Neskenon’s lacrosse was played according to Native Americans descriptions and depictions – with one-handed hand-made small-headed wooden sticks. Later it would become known as Czech lacrosse. This tournament is still held each year and is the oldest lacrosse tournament in the Continental Europe.

For the second beginning, the exact date and place is known – it was May 9, 1986, when some players of Czech (one-handed) lacrosse gathered at Prague’s Hvězda Open Air Arena to experience a new version of their sport. Many of them had hand-made fiber glass sticks which could not survive the demands imposed by players’ enthusiasm. Only a few players owned or even saw a real lacrosse stick. But it didn't matter for them because new excitement had emerged.

Next year, four teams of which three (TJ Malešice, LCC Radotín and Plzeň) are still active formed a local box lacrosse league played ever since (today called National Box Lacrosse League).

A visit of Quebec’s Pierre Fillion, an inventor of intercrosse, and his group of players in 1987 provided another momentum to the development of lacrosse in the former Czechoslovakia not only because Canadians donated sixty wooden sticks to the local players.

Shortly after this visit, an English field lacrosse team led by the former ELF president Peter Mundy arrived to Prague in 1988 to promote field lacrosse behind the Iron Curtain. Czech lacrosse representatives recognized that field lacrosse was more common version of lacrosse at the international level and pursued to equalize the focus between both versions of the game. Czech field lacrosse league (National Field Lacrosse League as it has been called since 2006) was initiated in 1992, attended by four teams LC Jižní Město, TJ Malešice, LC Plzeň and LCC Radotín. The Czech Republic was also the constituting member of the European Lacrosse Federation in 1995.

At the international level, the Czech field lacrosse team made its first appearance in the Manchester World Cup’s First Division in 1994 and attended every World Championship ever since. In 1995, the first European Lacrosse Championship was held in Prague and the Czech team ended as runner-up.

In 2003, the Czech team attended the first World Box (Indoor) Lacrosse Championship in Canada and went home with 5 losses and no win. Only 8 years later, almost exactly 25 years after the first box lacrosse match played in the Czech Republic, the World Box (Indoor) Lacrosse Championship was held in Prague and the Czechs reached their best position ever in their game when reached the semifinals as the best team from Europe.

In 2017 at first ever European Box Lacrosse Championships that was held in Turku, Finland, the team of the Czech Republic performed very well and they journey to become European Champions was stopped by Israelis in the final game. Despite this loss just by one goal, the Czechs confirmed their box lacrosse dominance in Europe.

Czech women made their debut at the international level in 1993 when the national team participated at the Women's World Championship in Edinburgh, Scotland, and reached 8th place. Czech players then participate at World Championships in 2005 (Annapolis, US), 2009 (Prague, Czech Republic) and in 2017 (Guilford, England) and always reached Top 10.

== Leagues ==
Box Lacrosse

- NBLL
- NBJL (junior)

Field Lacrosse

- NFLL
- NFJL (junior)

Women's lacrosse

- NLŽL
- JLŽL (junior)

Intercrosse

- Extraliga
- 1.liga
- 2.liga
- Junior League

Czech lacrosse (one-handed)

- 1.liga
- 2.liga
- Women's league
- Junior League

== Bodies ==
- ČSML (men's)
- ČŽL (women's)
- ČSI (intercrosse)
- SALH (specific Czech version of a one-handed lacrosse)
