= European Lacrosse Federation =

Regional governing body for lacrosse

- Sport: Lacrosse
- Jurisdiction: International
- Membership: 31
- Abbreviation: ELF
- Founded: 1995; 31 years ago
- Affiliation: World Lacrosse
- President: Steph Migchelsen

Official website
- europeanlacrosse.org

European Lacrosse Federation (ELF) is the sport governing body of men and women's lacrosse in Europe. It was founded in 1995 by the Czech Republic, Scotland, England, Sweden, Germany, and Wales. There are currently 34 member nations.

== Overview ==
The ELF sponsors the European Lacrosse Championships for national teams in both men’s and women's lacrosse. The annual Aleš Hřebeský Memorial tournament in Prague is the largest European box lacrosse tournament. The main club field lacrosse competition is the Ken Galluccio Cup, where the winner of each country’s league competes to decide the European club champion.

The ELF is an affiliate member of the lacrosse world governing body, World Lacrosse. 21 ELF members are full members of the WL, which is the majority of all full members.

In March 2022, due to the 2022 Russian invasion of Ukraine, Russian teams, athletes, and officials were suspended from participation in World Lacrosse events and qualifiers, and it was decided that no World Lacrosse or European Lacrosse Federation events would be held in Russia.

== Members ==
Country	Member Name
Austria	Austrian Lacrosse Association
Belgium	Belgian Lacrosse Federation
Bulgaria	Bulgarian Lacrosse Federation
Croatia	Croatian Lacrosse Association
Czech Republic	Czech Lacrosse Union
Denmark	Danish Lacrosse Federation
England	England Lacrosse
Estonia	Estonia Lacrosse
Finland	Finnish Lacrosse Association
France	French Lacrosse Association
Germany	German Lacrosse Association
Greece	Greece Lacrosse
Hungary	Hungary Lacrosse
Ireland	Ireland Lacrosse
Israel	Israel Lacrosse
Italy	Italian Lacrosse Federation
Latvia	Latvia Lacrosse Federation
Lithuania	Lithuania Lacrosse
Netherlands	Dutch Lacrosse Association
Norway	Norwegian Federation of American Sports
Poland	Polish Lacrosse Federation
Portugal	Portuguese Lacrosse Association
Russia	Russia Lacrosse
Scotland	Lacrosse Scotland
Serbia	Serbian Lacrosse Federation
Slovakia	Slovak Lacrosse Federation
Slovenia	Slovenia Lacrosse
Spain	Spanish Lacrosse Association
Sweden	Sweden Lacrosse
Switzerland	Swiss Lacrosse Federation
Turkey	Turkish Lacrosse Association
Ukraine	Ukrainian Lacrosse
Wales	Welsh Lacrosse Association
