= Welsh Lacrosse Association =

Governing body for lacrosse in Wales

- Sport: Lacrosse
- Jurisdiction: National
- Abbreviation: WLA
- Affiliation: World Lacrosse
- Affiliation date: 1972
- President: Gordon Shumack
- Secretary: Lou Scott
- Women's coach: Abby Burbank

Official website
- welshlacrosse.co.uk
- (Wales)

The Welsh Lacrosse Association (WLA) is the governing body for lacrosse in Wales. It was recognised by the International Federation of Women's Lacrosse Associations in 1972, the first year of the IFWLA. It is one of 34 full members of the Federation of International Lacrosse, the current international governing body for men's and women's lacrosse. The WLA is responsible for international competitions, including the International Festival of Lacrosse at Ebbw Vale, Blaenau Gwent county borough in 1992, the first Welsh men's international game in 85 years and the first to be played in Wales. WLA manages the Welsh men's and women's national lacrosse teams that play in the European Lacrosse Championships, the World Lacrosse Championships, and the Women's Lacrosse World Cup.

== Men's national lacrosse team ==
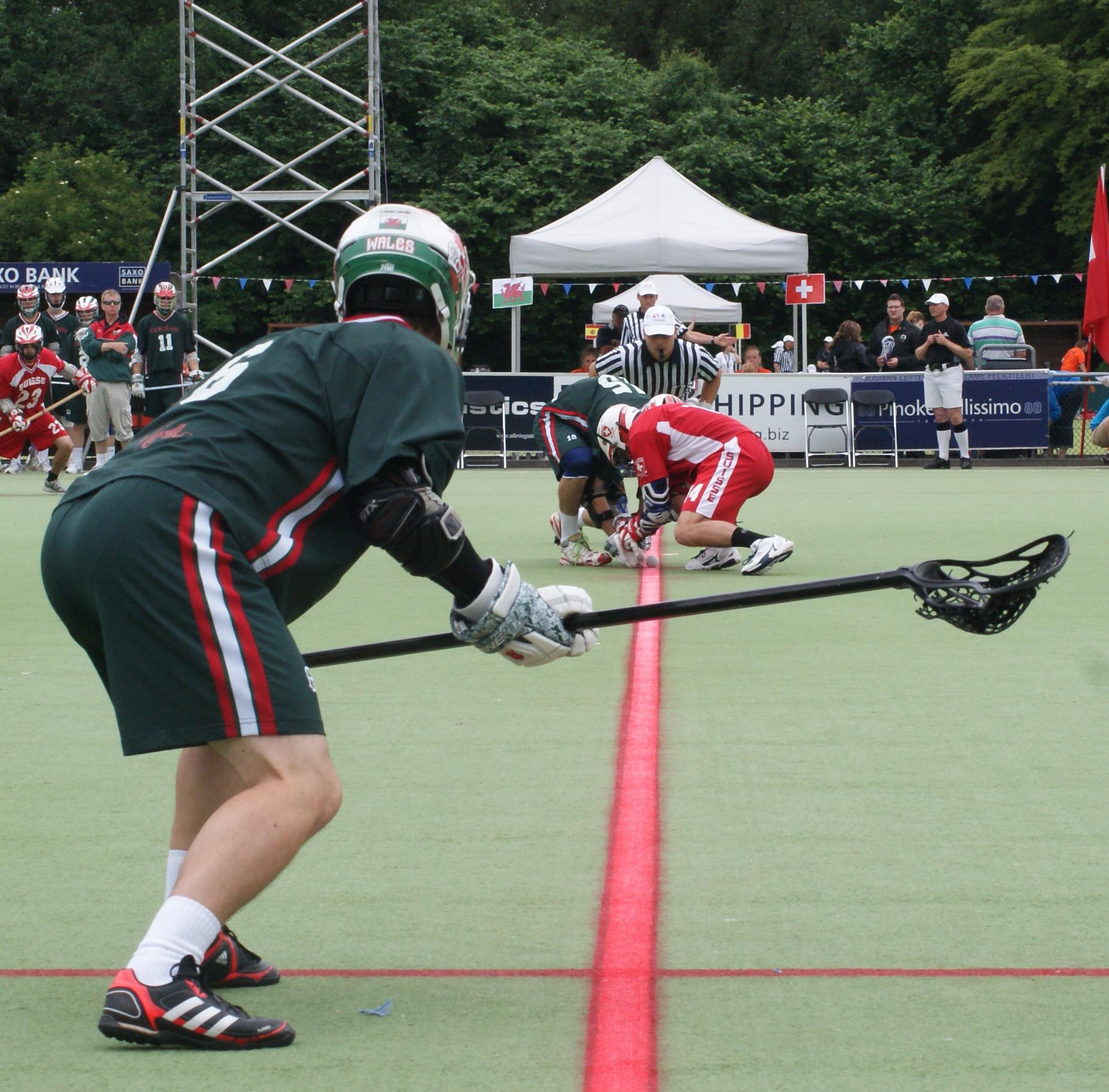
2012 European Lacrosse Championship in Amsterdam

In 1995, Wales finished third in the first European Lacrosse Championship in Prague, Czech Republic. Then the Dragons finished between fourth and seventh place in the next seven competitions, but fell to 10th place in 2012. In the last competition in 2016, Wales rebounded to 4th place.

Wales first competed in the World Lacrosse Championship in 1998 in Baltimore, Maryland, finishing last in 11th place. In the next three tournaments, Wales finished in 12th, 13th, and 11th place again, while the tournament size increased to 29 teams. In 2014, the Welsh men finished 17th of 38 nations.

Wales has not fielded a box lacrosse team in the World Indoor Lacrosse Championship.

== Women's national team ==
Wales finished sixth of six teams in the first three Women's Lacrosse World Cups in 1982, 1986, and 1989. Since then, Wales has finished between fourth (1997) and seventh (2017) place as the tournament has grown to 25 teams.

The Welsh women have earned a medal in all European Lacrosse Championships held since the first in 1996, except they did not compete in 2003. Wales was the gold medal winner in 1999, 2004, and 2008.
