= Norwegian Federation of American Sports =

Sports governing body in Norway

- Formation: 2010
- Headquarters: Oslo, Norway
- Managing director: Tone Sparby
- Website: amerikanskeidretter.no

The Norwegian Federation of American Sports (Norwegian: Norges Amerikanske Idretters Forbund; NAIF) is the governing body for American football, cheerleading, disc sports, flag football and lacrosse in Norway. It was created on January 1, 2010 by the merger of the Norwegian American Football and Cheerleading Federation (Norges Amerikansk Fotball og Cheerleading Forbund), the Norwegian Frisbee Federation (Norges Frisbeeforbund), and the Norwegian Lacrosse Federation (Norges Lacrosse Forbund). NAIF is a member of the Norwegian Olympic Committee, the International Federation of American Football, the International Cheer Union, the World Flying Disc Federation, and World Lacrosse.
