= List of national lacrosse governing bodies =

This is a list of nations that are represented by lacrosse national governing bodies. This list indicates which countries have participated in the five international lacrosse competitions sponsored by World Lacrosse, which oversees international lacrosse.

== Table key ==
WLC	World Lacrosse Championship
WILC	World Indoor Lacrosse Championship
WWC	Women's Lacrosse World Cup
M U-19	Men's Under-19 World Lacrosse Championships
W U-19	Women's Under-19 World Lacrosse Championships

== World Lacrosse members ==
Organizing body	Country	Established or Joined	WLC	WILC	WWC	M U-19	W U-19	Website
Argentina Lacrosse Association	(Argentina)	2002	•					
Australian Lacrosse Association	(Australia)	1974	•	•	•	•	•	
Austrian Lacrosse Association	(Austria)	2005	•		•			
Barbados Lacrosse	(Barbados)	2019						
Belgian Lacrosse Federation	(Belgium)	2009	•		•			
Bermuda Lacrosse Association	(Bermuda)	2002	•			•		
Bulgarian Lacrosse Federation	(Bulgaria)	2006						
Canadian Lacrosse Association	(Canada)	1867	•	•	•	•	•	
Chile Lacrosse	(Chile)	2010						
China Lacrosse Association	(China)	2009	•		•	•		
Colombia Lacrosse Association	(Colombia)	2013	•		•		•	
Costa Rica Lacrosse Sporting Association	(Costa Rica)	2008	•					
Croatia Lacrosse Association	(Croatia)	2016						
Czech Lacrosse Union	(Czech Republic)	1992	•	•	•	•	•	
Danish Lacrosse Federation	(Denmark)	2003	•		•			
Dominican Republic Lacrosse	(Dominican Republic)	2020						
Ecuador Lacrosse Association	(Ecuador)	2018						
England Lacrosse	(England)	1892	•	•	•	•	•	
Estonian Lacrosse	(Estonia)	2013						
Finnish Lacrosse Association	(Finland)	2001	•	•	•	•	•	
France Lacrosse Association	(France)	2008	•					
German Lacrosse Association	(Germany)	1994	•	•	•	•	•	
Ghana Lacrosse	(Ghana)	2019						
Greece Lacrosse Association	(Greece)	2017						
Associación Manos Amigas Guatemala	(Guatemala)	2010						
Haitian Federation of Lacrosse	(Haiti)	2016						
Haudenosaunee Nationals	(Haudenosaunee)	1983	•	•	•	•	•	
Hong Kong, China Lacrosse Association	(Hong Kong)	1993	•		•	•		
Hungarian Lacrosse Federation	(Hungary)	2010						
Ireland Lacrosse	(Republic of Ireland)	1879	•	•	•	•		
Israel Lacrosse	(Israel)	2010	•	•	•	•	•	
Italian Lacrosse Federation	(Italy)	2004	•		•			
Jamaica Lacrosse Association	(Jamaica)	2013						
Japanese Lacrosse Association	(Japan)	1987	•		•	•	•	
Kenya Lacrosse Association	(Kenya)	2016						
Korea Lacrosse Association	(South Korea)	1997	•		•	•	•	
Latvian Lacrosse Federation	(Latvia)	2003	•		•			
Luxembourg Lacrosse Federation	(Luxembourg)	2016						
Malaysia Lacrosse Association	(Malaysia)	2014						
Mexico Lacrosse Federation	(Mexico)	2009	•		•	•		
Dutch Lacrosse Association	(Netherlands)	2003	•		•		•	
New Zealand Lacrosse	(New Zealand)	2000	•		•		•	
Norwegian Lacrosse Federation	(Norway)	2007	•					
Pakistan Lacrosse Federation	(Pakistan)	2024						
Panama Lacrosse Association	(Panama)	2020						
Peru Lacrosse	(Peru)	2012						
Philippines Lacrosse Association	(Philippines)	2012	•					
Polish Lacrosse Federation	(Poland)	2011	•					
Portuguese Lacrosse Association	(Portugal)	2009						
Puerto Rico Lacrosse	(Puerto Rico)	2016						
Qatar Lacrosse Association	(Qatar)	2017						
Russian Lacrosse	(Russia)	2011	•					
Lacrosse Scotland	(Scotland)	1926	•	•	•	•	•	
Serbian Lacrosse Federation	(Serbia)	2010		•				
Singapore Lacrosse Association	(Singapore)	2012						
Slovak Lacrosse Federation	(Slovakia)	2003	•	•				
Slovenia Lacrosse Association	(Slovenia)	2005						
Spain Lacrosse	(Spain)	2004	•		•			
Sweden Lacrosse	(Sweden)	1994	•		•			
Swiss Lacrosse	(Switzerland)	2008	•	•	•			
Taiwan Lacrosse Association	(Taiwan)	2014				•		
Thailand Lacrosse Association	(Thailand)	2010	•					
Turkey Lacrosse Association	(Turkey)	2009	•	•				
Uganda Lacrosse	(Uganda)	2010	•					
Ukrainian Lacrosse Association	(Ukraine)	2018						
US Lacrosse	(United States)	1998	•	•	•	•	•	
US Virgin Islands Lacrosse Association	(United States Virgin Islands)	2020						
Uzbekistan Lacrosse	(Uzbekistan)	2023						
Welsh Lacrosse Association	(Wales)	1930	•		•	•	•	

== Independent national organizing bodies ==
Organizing body	Country	Website
Lacrosse Association of India	(India)	
