= Israel Lacrosse Association =

Governing body for lacrosse in Israel

- Sport: Lacrosse
- Founded: 2010
- Affiliation: World Lacrosse
- Affiliation date: 2011
- Regional affiliation: European Lacrosse Federation
- Affiliation date: 2012
- Headquarters: Ashkelon, Israel
- Director: Ian Kadish
- Men's coach: William Beroza
- Women's coach: Sophie Bass

Official website
- www.lacrosse.co.il
- (Israel)

The Israel Lacrosse Association (ILA; Hebrew: איגוד הלקרוס הישראלי), or Israel Lacrosse, is the official governing body of lacrosse in Israel, and is a member of World Lacrosse and the European Lacrosse Federation.

== History ==
The Israel Lacrosse Association was founded to develop and promote lacrosse within Israel and strives to offer lacrosse to Israelis of all ages. Israel Lacrosse was founded in 2010 by Scott Neiss who previously served as an executive for the National Lacrosse League, along with William Beroza and Howard Borkan. It was officially granted associate membership by the Federation of International Lacrosse (FIL; later renamed as World Lacrosse) in April 2011. ILA became part of the European Lacrosse Federation in 2012.

The program started with players and staff born in North America but with links to Israel. But there has been efforts from the federation to develop players born in Israel for both the men's and women's national team programs.

Israel was given the hosting rights for the 2018 World Lacrosse Championship, after the original hosts Manchester, England withdrew.

== Israel Premier Lacrosse League ==
The Israel Premier Lacrosse League (IPLL) is the premier lacrosse league in Israel, which debuted in 2015. The league competes during summer months only, in an attempt to attract players from abroad to participate.

== International competition ==
Israel fields men's, indoor, and women's national teams, which compete at both European and World levels.

=== European Lacrosse Championships ===
In 2016, Israel's men's team won the Silver Medal, placing second in a field of 24, England won the gold 7-6 in regulation play. This was Israel's first medal in international play.

Year	Result
(Netherlands) 2012	8th place
(Hungary) 2016	2nd place

=== World Lacrosse Championships ===
In its first-ever appearance, for the Men's 2014 World Lacrosse Championship in Denver, Israel finished in 7th place out of 38 nations. Four years later, with the 2018 World Lacrosse Championship held in Netanya, Israel, Israel again finished in 7th place, this time out of 46 nations.

Year	Result
(United States) 2014	7th place
(Israel) 2018	7th place
(United States) 2023	7th place

=== Women's European Lacrosse Championships ===
Year	Result
(Czech Republic) 2015	4th place
(Israel) 2019	2nd place

=== Women's Lacrosse World Cup ===
Year	Result
(Canada) 2013	8th place
(England) 2017	6th place
(United States) 2022	6th place
(Japan) 2026	3rd place

=== IIJL World Junior Lacrosse Championship ===
Year	Result
(Haudenosaunee) 2015	12th place
(Canada) 2019	4th place
(Canada) 2022	4th place
(Canada) 2023	3rd place

== Shabbat policy ==
The ILA has a consistent position of not playing or scheduling games during Shabbat. Israel Lacrosse released a statement saying: “As a new sport to Israel it is imperative . . . we cannot ignore that reasonably large percentage of our nations’ people, our teams’ players and our associations’ members would be offended if we took the field on Shabbat." The organization has stated that the policy is a national identity issue, not a religious issue.
