= Uganda men's national lacrosse team =

Men's national field lacrosse team of Uganda

Uganda
- Nickname(s): The Lacrosse Cranes
- WL membership: 2011
- Association: Uganda Lacrosse Association
- Confederation: Africa Association of Lacrosse
- Head coach: (Uganda) Patrick Oriana

World Championship
- Appearances: 3 (first in 2014)
- Best result: 29th (2023)
- Website: ugandalacrosse.ug

The Uganda men's national lacrosse team, also known as the Lacrosse Cranes, represents Uganda in international lacrosse competitions and is governed by the Uganda Lacrosse Association (ULA), which is a full member of World Lacrosse, the international governing body for lacrosse. ULA is also fully recognized by the Uganda National Council of Sports (NCS), as well as the Uganda Olympic Committee (UOC).

== History ==
The Uganda Lacrosse Association (ULA), the national sports body for lacrosse in Uganda became an associate member of what was then the Federation of International Lacrosse (now World Lacrosse) in 2011.

The Uganda national team made their international debut in 2014 by featuring in the World Lacrosse Championship for the first time at the 2014 edition held in Denver, United States where they were mentored by American coach Tanner Scales. They were also the first African team to feature in the tournament. Their game against South Korea was their first win in the tournament, winning over their Asian opponents, 10-9. They finished 34th among 38th competitors.

They entered the 2018 World Lacrosse Championship in Israel for their second appearance in the international lacrosse competition. They placed 40th in this tournament. They are led by Israeli coach, Peter Ginnegar.

In November 2020, ULA became a full member of World Lacrosse becoming the first from Africa to do so. Uganda is among the four founding members of the Africa Association of Lacrosse (AAL) which was established in early 2022.

They qualified for the 2023 World Lacrosse Championship in San Diego by beating Kenya in the very first AAL qualification tournament in November 2022.

== World Lacrosse Championships ==
=== 2014 World Lacrosse Championship ===
In September 2013, Andrew Boston, an Ellicott City, MD native, was named the head coach of the Uganda men's senior national lacrosse team, with a strong supporting cast of assistants in Tom Schreiber (offensive coordinator), Tanner Scales (defensive coordinator), and Casey Lavallee.

In July, Steinhardt was named the general manager of the team, but the hard work had just begun, and even getting to the United States was a challenge, as defection was a real concern especially after more than 12 African athletes went missing after the 2012 Olympics in London. Political maneuvering by U.S. Congressman Dutch Ruppersberger, a former player at the University of Maryland, College Park helped, as relations between the U.S. and Uganda over an anti-gay law signed by the president of Uganda in earlier in the year in February added complexity to the proceedings.

A fundraiser, the Dream 2014 Campaign, launched by former Louisville lacrosse player Aimee Dixon, now the director of philanthropy at World Lacrosse, raised about $150,000 to pay for travel expenses for the team and coaching staff, with his players' visas not secured until days before the team was scheduled to fly to Denver, Colorado.

The team made their international debut at the World Lacrosse Championship in 2014, played in Denver, Colorado, United States as the first African team to feature in the tournament. In 2011, Castro David Onen, who begun playing lacrosse in 2010 scored the first goal in the first lacrosse game to ever be played on African soil, and on July 11, 2014, in Uganda's very first game of the tournament, he scored the first ever goal for an African team in the World Lacrosse Championship, in a 17–1 loss to Ireland, as he ran by two Ireland defenders and put the ball in the back of the net in the third quarter of the team's international debut.

Three days later, Uganda erased a five-goal deficit, scoring the final six goals with 6:17 left, in a game against the Republic of Korea to earn its first-ever world championship win. Patrick 'Pato' Oriana, the captain, scored the game-winning goal off a faceoff with 36 seconds left to lift Uganda to a 10–9, in a dramatic, storybook, spectacular fashion, coming from behind after trailing 9–4, and scoring twice in the final 44 seconds.

They ended the tournament ranked finished 34th among 38th competitors, coming away with two wins over Korea and Argentina over the seven games they played, and gaining global attention - featuring on the cover of the September 2014 edition of USA Lacrosse Magazine, a publication of US Lacrosse, the sport's governing body in the United States.

The Lacrosse Cranes' journey to the 2014 championship was the subject of a documentary called Kandote (a Ugandan word meaning "let me dream"), a film by former Johns Hopkins University lacrosse player Will McCance.

Four players from this team eventually played in the Israel Premier Lacrosse League; Patrick Oriana and Castro David Onen for Barak Netanya Lacrosse Club, then Jaffari Ibrahim Makanda and Kenneth Kasule for Askelon Lacrosse Club.

==== 2014 Uganda men's senior national lacrosse team ====
Number	Name	Position
6	Andrew Musasizi	M
1	Allan Amone	G
!3	Joshua Okecho	D
6	Ivan Musisi	D
11	Faisal Nsubuga	A
13	Castro David Onen	M
14	Ryan Mugisa	A
24	James Tabu	A
30	Felix Nyekorac	D
33	Michael Bahizi	D
48	Patrick Oriana	M
86	Salim Kyambadde	D
7	Kenneth Kasule	A
8	Jimmy Tabu	G
12	Jaffari Ibrahim Makanda	A
17	Keith Lubangakene	M
40	Ronald Otim	D
91	Brian Yunis Tukire	M
6	Liberty Twesiime	A/M

=== 2018 World Lacrosse Championship ===
In May 2017, Matt Holman, a Summit, New Jersey native, was named general manager of the Uganda men's national senior lacrosse team. Holman was the founder and executive director of the East-West Lacrosse foundation, president of Southwestern Lacrosse Conference (SLC) and director of the Men's Collegiate Lacrosse Association (MCLA) National Championships.

In June 2017, hall-of-famer Peter Ginnegar, who had served as Israel’s assistant coach for the past six years, winning the silver medal at the 2016 European Lacrosse Championship in Budapest, Hungary was named head coach.

In 2015, Ginnegar had led the Barak Netanya Lacrosse Club to a championship in the inaugural season of the Israel Premier Lacrosse League before being inducted in the Queens University of Charlotte Hall of Fame in, where he had been an athlete in his college days. He had previously enjoyed 11 seasons as head coach at Claremont Colleges and 32 years overall as a college lacrosse coach at division II and III levels.

At Barack Netanya, he coached Patrick Oriana, a former captain of the 2014 Uganda Men's National Senior Lacrosse Team, and its future Head Coach.

In November 2017, John Christmas, the former Virginia All-American attackman and then De La Salle (Calif.) coach, Francis Donald, the former Nazareth All-American long pole and current Bishop’s School (Calif.) coach, and Mike Allan, a two-time MCLA championship-winning coach at UC Santa Barbara, were added as assistant coaches. Ivan Cohen was named the goalie's coach.

Uganda entered the 2018 World Lacrosse Championship in Netanya, Israel for their second appearance in the international lacrosse competition, eventually placing 40th out of 46 teams the tournament after winning only one of eight games played; a 7-6 come from behind win over Luxembourg. Uganda was behind, 5-2 at halftime, before the Lacrosse Cranes put together a 3-0 run giving them the lead and a revitalized energy and managing to hold on to the lead.

==== 2018 Uganda men's senior national lacrosse team ====
In May 2018, head coach Ginnegar announced the final 23-man roster for the 2018 World Lacrosse Championship.

Name	Position
Richard Akena	D
Allan Amone	G
Andrew Musasizi	M
Jeff Anywar	M
Michael Bahizi	D
Benard Otim	D
Castro David Onen	A/M
Kenneth Ssazi	M
Kenneth Kasule	M
Trey Kawugule	M
Martin Komakech	M
Keith Lubangakene	M
Jaffari Ibrahim Makanda	D
Alberto Mugaga	G
Faisal Nsubuga	A
Samson Ochan	A
John Paul Okura	D
Patrick Oriana	M
Collines Odiira	M
James Okello	G
Reagan Ochan	M
Ronald Otim	D
Ibrahim Ssetimba	M
Pitta Shaban	D
Brian Yunis Tukire	M/D
Liberty Twesiime	A/M
Dalton Wadri	M

=== 2023 World Lacrosse Championship ===
In May 2022, Ugandan-born and reared Patrick Oriana, who previously played under Peter Ginnegar for the Barack Netanya Lacrosse club of the Israel Premier Lacrosse League, was named the head coach, the first Ugandan to hold that position, with Sam Otoa as the assistant. Oriana had been the captain of the 2014 Uganda men's national senior lacrosse team.

On Saturday morning, November 19, 2022, Under Oriana's leadership, Uganda outlasted rivals Kenya, coached by his mentor, Peter Ginnegar, 9–8, in triple overtime at Kenton College Preparatory School in Nairobi City in the first-ever Africa Association of Lacrosse qualifier to secure the last spot at the 2023 World Lacrosse Men's Championship in San Diego, California. It was a stunning comeback for Uganda on Kenya's home soil in front of an eager crowd as Kenya led 3–2 at the end of the first period, and Uganda never led the rest of the way until the ultimate sudden golden goal. Uganda will appear in its third consecutive men's world championship in San Diego, as the only African team to ever participate in one, let alone three consecutive ones.

In May 2023, the U.S.-based and educated Ugandan-born engineer Brian M. Kwesiga, who previously served as the president and CEO of the Ugandan North American Association (UNAA), the largest and oldest formal Ugandan diaspora organization was named general manager of the Uganda men's national senior lacrosse team, the first person of Ugandan origin to hold the position.

==== 2023 Uganda men's senior national lacrosse team ====
Head Coach Oriana announced the 26-man roster for the 2023 World Lacrosse Championship on March 16, 2023.

Name	Position
Andrew Asiimwe	G
Allan Amone	G
Daniel Otimu	G
Innocent Anyala	D
Pitta Shaban	D
Benard Otim	D
Max Phillips	D
Damson Lyaleng	D
Chris Palanda	M
Michael Ochan	M
Solomon Adiyo	M
Francis Odong	M
Martin Komakech	M
Roger Anywar	M
Keith Lubangakene	M
Owen Waluku	M
John Brian Mukaga	M
George Ogik	M
Yosef Ngowe	M
Paul Mbusa	M
Edward Komakech	G
Aaron Lyaleng	M
Swaibu Meliga	F
Benjamin Ojok	F
Faisal Nsubuga	F
Finn Phillips	F

== Competitive record ==
=== World Lacrosse Championships record ===
Year	Host	GP	W	L	GF	GA	Finish
2014	United States	7	2	5	40	78	34th
2018	Israel	8	1	7	35	111	40th
2023	United States	7	0	7	19	92	29th
Total	−	22	3	19	94	281	No Medal

== General managers and head coaches ==
=== General managers ===
- (Uganda) (United States) Brian M. Kwesiga (2023−)
- (United States) Matt Holman (2017−2018)
- (United States) Tyler Steinhardt (2012−2015)

=== Head coaches ===
- (United States) Head Coach Andrew Boston (2013−2014)
- (Israel) (United States) Head Coach Peter Ginnegar (2017−2018)
- (Uganda) Head Coach Patrick Oriana (2022−)
