= Chinese Taipei women's national lacrosse team =

Chinese Taipei
- WL membership: 2015
- Association: Chinese Taipei Lacrosse Association
- Confederation: APLU (Asia–Pacific)

World Championship
- Appearances: 1 (first in 2026)
- Best result: 15th place (2026)

Asia Pacific Championship
- Appearances: 2 (first in 2019)
- Best result: 4th place (2025)

The Chinese Taipei women's national lacrosse team is the national team that represents the Taiwan in international lacrosse competitions under the name "Chinese Taipei".

== History ==
The Taiwan or Chinese Taipei first became a member of World Lacrosse in 2015. The Taiwan Lacrosse Association (TWLA) became a member of the world lacrosse body then known as the Federation of International Lacrosse. TWLA later became the Chinese Taipei Lacrosse Association.

The Chinese Taipei national senior team competed at the 2025 Asia-Pacific Women's Lacrosse Championship.

Chinese Taipei missed the podium after losing to the Philippines at the bronze medal game of the 2025 Asia-Pacific Championship in Australia. They qualify nevertheless for the 2026 World Lacrosse Women's Championship in Japan.

== Competitive record ==
=== World Lacrosse Championship ===
Year	Host	GP	W	L	GF	GA	Finish
2017	England	Did not enter					−
2022	United States	Did not enter					−
2026	Japan	5	1	5	37	64	15th
Total	−	5	1	5	37	64	No Medal

=== Asia-Pacific Lacrosse Championship ===
Year	Host	GP	W	L	GF	GA	Finish
2019	South Korea	5	0	5	15	86	6th
2025	Australia	4	2	3	41	73	4th
Total	−	9	2	8	56	159	No medal
