= Puerto Rico women's national lacrosse team =

Puerto Rico
- WL membership: 2016
- Association: Puerto Rico Lacrosse
- Confederation: Pan-American Lacrosse Association

World Championship
- Appearances: 2 (first in 2026)
- Best result: Eight place (2026)

First international
- Argentina 2–15 Puerto Rico (November 14, 2019; Auburndale, United States)

The Puerto Rico women's national lacrosse team is the national team that represents Puerto Rico in international lacrosse competitions. It is organized by Puerto Rico Lacrosse, a full member of World Lacrosse.

== History ==
Puerto Rico Lacrosse started their women's national team program at the youth level, building a under-20 team for their participation in the 2019 FIL Women's U-19 World Lacrosse Championship in Canada.

Puerto Rico first fielded a women's senior field lacrosse team at the Pan-American Lacrosse Association (PALA) Women's World Lacrosse Qualifiers held in November 2019. The team finished as runners-up at the tournament in Auburndale, Florida losing to the Haudenosaunee in the final. They however qualified for their first ever World Lacrosse Women's Championship scheduled in 2021.

Puerto Rico made World Championship debut in the 2022 edition of the tournament which postponed by a year. Puerto Rico finished eleventh in the tournament held in Towson, Maryland.

They took part at the 2026 World Lacrosse Women's Championship in Japan. Puerto Rico improved upon on their first outing, finishing eight in the 2026 tournament.

== Competitive record ==
=== Pan-American Lacrosse Championship ===
Year	Host	GP	W	L	GF	GA	Finish
2025	United States	5	3	2	56	64	4th
Total	−	5	3	2	56	64	No Medal

=== World Lacrosse Championship ===
Year	Host	GP	W	L	GF	GA	Finish
2022	United States	8	5	3	79	63	11th
2026	Japan	6	2	4	57	85	8th
Total	−	14	7	7	136	148	No Medal
