= 1998 World Lacrosse Championship final =

The 1998 World Lacrosse Championship final between Canada and the United States was the gold medal game of the 1998 World Lacrosse Championship and has been often cited as the best field lacrosse game of all time.

== Context ==
The United States had not lost an international lacrosse game since the 1978 WLC final, up until then, their only loss in international competition. Although expected to be challenged somewhat by the Canadians, the U.S. team was widely expected to take the gold. Their round robin match had ended in a 14-12 U.S. victory.

== Rosters ==
=== Canada ===
- Jamie Bowen
- Steve Fannell
- Gary Gait
- Paul Gait
- Eric Gervais
- Chris Gill
- Jeff Gombar
- Steve Govett
- John Grant, Jr.
- Del Halliday
- Fred Jenner
- Bryan Kopec
- Tom Marechek
- Randy Mearns
- Tom Phair
- Jeff Ratcliffe
- Darren Reisig
- Chris Sanderson
- Ted Sawicki
- Matt Shearer
- Dan Stroup
- Rodney Tapp
- John Tavares
- Steve Toll
- Jim Veltman
- Rob Williams

=== United States ===
Head Coach: Bill Tierney
Assistant Coaches: William Beroza, Jeff Long, Paul Wehrum

Goalkeepers

- Sal LoCascio
- Brian Dougherty

Attack

- Bill Miller
- Michael Watson
- Mark Millon
- Darren Lowe
- Jesse Hubbard
- Casey Powell

Midfield

- Kevin Finneran
- Andy Ross
- David Curry
- Rob Shek
- Greg Traynor
- Charlie Lockwood
- Peter Jacobs
- Blake Miller
- Tim Soudan
- Ryan Wade
- Milford Marchant

Defense

- Brian Voelker
- Joe Breschi
- David Morrow
- Pat McCabe
- Zack Colburn
- Reid Jackson
- John DeTommaso

== Game ==
=== First Quarter ===
After USA goaltender Sal Locasio made an early save, Canada drew first blood but it ended up being their only goal of the entire half.

=== Third Quarter ===
By the middle of the 3rd quarter the United States was up 11–1.

=== Fourth Quarter ===
By the last few minutes of the fourth quarter the score was 13–10, with USA still in the lead. Then in the last minute and a half of regulation, Canada had three unanswered goals to tie the game and send it into overtime.

=== Double Overtime ===
The United States barely outscored Canada in double overtime, 2–1, with the final score being 15–14 in favor of the US.

== See also ==
- World Lacrosse Championship
- Federation of International Lacrosse
- Field lacrosse
