= Philippines men's national lacrosse team =

Philippines
- WL membership: 2014
- Association: Philippines Lacrosse Association
- Confederation: APLU (Asia–Pacific)
- Head coach: Kirk Ventiquattro
- Captain: Dan Morris

World Championship
- Appearances: 2 (first in 2018)
- Best result: Tenth place (2018)

Asia Pacific Championship
- Appearances: 1 (first in 2025)
- Best result: Runners-up (2025)

The Philippines men's national lacrosse team is the national team that represents the Philippines in international lacrosse competitions. It is organized by the Philippines Lacrosse Association, a full member of World Lacrosse and an associate member of the Asia Pacific Lacrosse Union.

== History ==
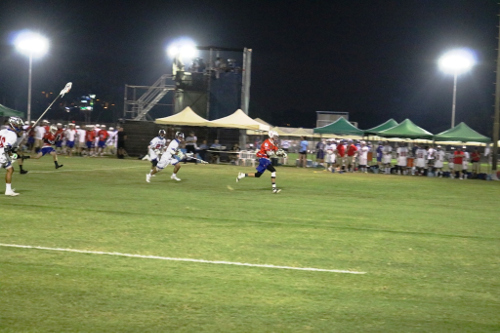
The Philippines playing against the Czech Republic at the 2018 World Lacrosse Championship

=== Early years ===
The Philippine national team played their first ever lacrosse game against Costa Rica at the Estadio Municipal El Labrador in Vázquez de Coronado in December 2012. The Philippines won that game, with Ron Garcia becoming the first player to score an international goal for the country.

Lacrosse was officially introduced in the Philippines in September 2013, when Philippines Lacrosse Association (PLA) outreach director Justin Manjares and president Ron Garcia met with the Philippine Olympic Committee (POC) and the Philippine Sports Commission (PSC). They discussed promoting the sport under the guidance of the POC and PSC.

The PLA became the 50th member of World Lacrosse (then known as the Federation of International Lacrosse) following a vote on February 17, 2014.

=== Entry into international competition ===
The Philippines made their first appearance at the World Lacrosse Championship during the 2014 edition, although they only participated in the festival tournament and not the main competition. The national team competed in the Elite Division of the World Lacrosse Festivals against teams including Ireland, Japan, Thailand, and the United States. They finished seventh out of 16 teams with a 2–2 record.

The Philippines went on to participate in other international invitational tournaments such as the 2014 International Lacrosse Festival of the Israel Lacrosse Association, the 2016 Philadelphia International Showdown, and the 2017 Memorial Day Weekend International Lacrosse Festival.

=== World Championship debut and APLU admission ===
As of 2018, the Philippines had not yet been admitted to the Asia-Pacific Lacrosse Union (APLU), which rendered them ineligible for the 2015 and 2017 ASPAC games.

In July 2017, Carthage Senior High School coach Kirk Ventiquattro was appointed as head coach for the 2018 World Lacrosse Championship. Ventiquattro retained his coaching responsibilities at Carthage while taking on the national team role. The Philippines competed in the Grey Division alongside the Czech Republic and Belgium, finishing at the top of the group. They placed 10th overall in the tournament, losing only to host Israel and Germany in the later rounds.

In February 2022, the Philippines became a full member of the APLU.

=== Developments from 2023 onward ===
The Philippines qualified for the 2023 World Lacrosse Championship via the 2022 Asia Pacific Qualifier under the guidance of returning head coach Kirk Ventiquattro. The team initially finished in 15th place but was later demoted to 30th (last place) due to non-compliance with eligibility requirements.

They took part at the 2026 Asia-Pacific Men's Lacrosse Championship finishing as silver medalists and qualifying for the 2027 World Lacrosse Championship.

== Competitive record ==
=== World Lacrosse Championship ===
Year	Host	GP	W	L	GF	GA	Finish
2014	United States	Did not enter (Note: The Philippines did not participate in the main tournament. However they did participate in 2014 World Lacrosse Festivals.)					−
2018	Israel	7	5	2	70	51	10th
2023	United States	7	5	2	63	38	30th (Note: Originally placed 15th, but was relegated to 30th place over failing to comply over eligibility requirements)
2027	Japan	Qualified					−
Total	−	7	5	2	133	89	No Medal

=== Asia Pacific Lacrosse Championship ===
Year	Host	GP	W	L	GF	GA	Finish
2015	Thailand	Not an APLU member					−
2017	South Korea	Not an APLU member					−
2019	South Korea	Not an APLU member					−
2026	New Zealand	5	5	0	54	34	2nd place, silver medalist(s)
Total	−	5	5	0	54	34	1 silver

== Head coaches ==
- (United States) Kirk Ventiquattro (2017−2018)
- (United States) Justin Manjares (2022−)
