= 2026 World Lacrosse Women's Championship Division II =

Tournament details
- Host country: Poland
- Venue: 1 (in 1 host city)
- Dates: July 11 – 18, 2026
- Teams: 12

Tournament statistics
- Games played: 42

The 2026 World Lacrosse Women's Championship Division II tournament, is the inaugural second division tournament for the World Lacrosse Women's Championship. It was hosted in Wrocław, Poland.

It is below the World Championship in Tokyo, Japan.

== Participating nations ==
=== Qualification ===
Continental championships served as the qualification path for originally 16 participating teams – although only 12 teams ultimately took part. Poland as hosts automatically qualifies.

Qualification	Hosts	Date(s)	Spot(s)	Qualifier(s)
Host nation	N/A	September 2025	1	Poland
2024 Women's European Lacrosse Championship	(Portugal) Braga	10–20 July	~~8~~ 6	Italy; Netherlands; Latvia; ~~Sweden~~; Switzerland; Spain; Norway; ~~Finland~~
2025 Asia-Pacific Women's Lacrosse Championship	(Australia) Sunshine Coast	6–11 January	~~4~~ 3	New Zealand; Hong Kong; ~~China~~; South Korea
2025 Pan-American Women's Lacrosse Championship	(United States) Auburndale	26–30 June	~~3~~ 1	Mexico; ~~Jamaica~~; ~~Peru~~
Africa allocation	N/A	N/A	1	South Africa

== Venues ==
The 2026 World Lacrosse Women's Championship Division II was held at the Pola Marsowe of the Olympic Stadium Complex in Wrocław.

Wrocław	2026 World Lacrosse Women's Championship Division II is located in Poland
Pola Marsowe	2026 World Lacrosse Women's Championship Division II is located in Poland
Capacity: N/A	2026 World Lacrosse Women's Championship Division II is located in Poland

== Group stage ==
=== Pool A ===
Pos	Team	Pld	W	L	PF	PA	PD	Qualification
1	New Zealand	5	5	0	68	25	+43	Advance to Semifinals
2	South Korea	5	4	1	58	36	+22	Advance to Semifinals
3	Latvia	5	3	2	48	42	+6	Advance to 5th–8th place games
4	Spain	5	2	3	47	57	−10	Advance to 5th–8th place games
5	Netherlands	5	1	4	42	62	−20	Advance to 9th–12th place games
6	South Africa	5	0	5	31	72	−41	Advance to 9th–12th place games

Source: World Lacrosse

=== Pool B ===
Pos	Team	Pld	W	L	PF	PA	PD	Qualification
1	Mexico	5	5	0	50	28	+22	Advance to Semifinals
2	Italy	5	4	1	70	23	+47	Advance to Semifinals
3	Poland (H)	5	3	2	41	43	−2	Advance to 5th–8th place games
4	Hong Kong	5	2	3	43	33	+10	Advance to 5th–8th place games
5	Switzerland	5	1	4	28	57	−29	Advance to 9th–12th place games
6	Norway	5	0	5	24	72	−48	Advance to 9th–12th place games

Source: World Lacrosse
(H) Hosts

== 5th–12th placement round ==
=== Places 5–8 ===
5th–8th games
A3	Latvia	9
B4	Hong Kong	11
B3	Poland	8
A4	Spain	9

5th position game
B4	Hong Kong	9
A4	Spain	8
7th position game
A3	Latvia	6
B3	Poland	11

July 17, 2026; 14:00	Latvia	9–11 (3–2, 3–1, 2–3, 1–5)	Hong Kong	Pola Marsowe, Wrocław

Game reference

July 17, 2026; 16:15	Poland	8–9 (4–3, 2–1, 2–1, 0–4)	Spain	Pola Marsowe, Wrocław

Game reference

==== Fifth place game ====
July 18, 2026; 18:30	Hong Kong	9–8 (3–3, 3–1, 1–2, 2–2)	Spain	Pola Marsowe, Wrocław

Game reference

==== Seventh place game ====
July 18, 2026; 10:00	Latvia	6–11 (0–3, 3–5, 2–2, 1–1)	Poland	Pola Marsowe, Wrocław

Game reference

=== Places 9–12 ===
9th–12th games
B5	Switzerland	6
A6	South Africa	7
A5	Netherlands	9
B6	Norway	10

9th position game
B6	Norway	7
A6	South Africa	8
11th position game
A5	Netherlands	13
B5	Switzerland	8

July 17, 2026; 14:00	Switzerland	6–7 (2–1, 3–1, 1–2, 0–3)	South Africa	Pola Marsowe, Wrocław

Game reference

July 17, 2026; 16:15	Netherlands	9–10 (0–4, 3–3, 2–2, 4–1)	Norway	Pola Marsowe, Wrocław

Game reference

==== Ninth place game ====
July 18, 2026; 13:30	Norway	7–8 (0–5, 2–2, 1–0, 4–1)	South Africa	Pola Marsowe, Wrocław

Game reference

==== Eleventh place game ====
July 18, 2026; 11:00	Netherlands	13–8 (5–1, 4–3, 2–1, 2–3)	Switzerland	Pola Marsowe, Wrocław

Game reference

== Final round ==
Third place
July 18 – Wrocław
A1	New Zealand	8
A2	South Korea	7

Semifinals
July 16 – Wrocław
A1	New Zealand	5
B2	Italy	10
July 16 – Wrocław
B1	Mexico	15
A2	South Korea	7

Final
July 18 – Wrocław
B1	Mexico	4
B2	Italy	11

=== Semifinals ===
July 16, 2026; 16:30	New Zealand	5–10 (0–4, 1–2, 1–2, 3–2)	Italy	Pola Marsowe, Wrocław

Game reference

July 16, 2026; 19:00	Mexico	15–7 (4–1, 3–2, 3–3, 5–1)	South Korea	Pola Marsowe, Wrocław

Game reference

=== Third place game ===
July 18, 2026; 15:15	New Zealand	8–7 (3–1, 3–2, 2–2, 0–2)	South Korea	Pola Marsowe, Wrocław

Game reference

=== Final ===
July 18, 2026; 18:00	Mexico	4–11 (1–2, 1–3, 2–0, 0–6)	Italy	Pola Marsowe, Wrocław

Game reference

=== Standings ===
Pos	Team	Pld	W	L	GF	GA	GD	Pts
1	Italy	7	6	1	91	32	+59	13
2	Mexico	7	6	1	69	46	+23	13
3	New Zealand	7	6	1	71	42	+29	13
4	South Korea	7	4	3	72	59	+13	11
5	Hong Kong	7	4	3	63	50	+13	11
6	Spain	7	3	4	64	74	−10	10
7	Poland (H)	7	4	3	60	58	+2	11
8	Latvia	7	3	4	63	64	−1	10
9	South Africa	7	2	5	46	88	−42	9
10	Norway	7	1	6	41	89	−48	8
11	Netherlands	7	2	5	64	80	−16	9
12	Switzerland	7	1	6	42	77	−35	8

(H) Hosts

=== All-Tournament Team ===
Attack	Midfield	Defense	Goalkeeper
(New Zealand) Sarah Butler; (Italy) Elise Fawcett (MVP); (Mexico) Sophia Lima	(South Korea) Helen Bae; (New Zealand) Brooke Bolstad; (Italy) Stephanie Colson	(Italy) Gabriela Chiappetta; (New Zealand) Maya Rutherford; (Mexico) Natalie Yorba	(Mexico) Alexa Lang
Source: World Lacrosse
