= Puerto Rico Lacrosse =

Governing body of lacrosse in the Philippines

- Sport: Lacrosse
- Jurisdiction: National
- Abbreviation: PRLAX
- Founded: 2016
- Affiliation: World Lacrosse
- Affiliation date: 2016
- Regional affiliation: Pan-American Lacrosse Association
- President: Miguel Lozada

Official website
- puertoricolacrosse.com
- (Puerto Rico)

Puerto Rico Lacrosse (PRLAX) is the governing body for lacrosse in the U.S. territory of Puerto Rico.

== History ==
Puerto Rico Lacrosse (PRLAX) was established by former teammates Liberty Flames Nathan Lowmaster and Miguel Lozada. In May 2016, the duo showcased the sport of lacrosse at the Las Justas in San Juan.

In October 2016, PRLAX became the 56th member of the Federation of International Lacrosse (FIL; later renamed as World Lacrosse) as an associate.

The immediate goal of PRLAX was to field a men's national team for the 2018 World Lacrosse Championship in Netanya, Israel. A women's national team was formed in 2019.

The PALA Sixes Cup, a lacrosse sixes competition for both men's and women's national teams, was the first ever international lacrosse event to be held in Puerto Rico. The 2025 edition was hosted from December 10 to 14 in Humacao.

The Puerto Rico Olympic Committee recognized PRLAX as the governing body for lacrosse in the territory in March 2026.

== Puerto Rico men's national lacrosse team ==
=== Competitive record ===
==== PALA Sixes Cup ====
Year	Host	Result	GP	W	L	GF	GA
2021	United States	2nd	0	0	0	0	0
2023	Jamaica	1st	0	0	0	0	0
2025	Puerto Rico	2nd	0	0	0	0	0
Total		3/3	0	0	0	0	0

1st place, gold medalist(s)	2nd place, silver medalist(s)	3rd place, bronze medalist(s)	Total
1	2	0	3

==== World Lacrosse Championship ====
Year	Host	Result	GP	W	L	GF	GA
2018	Israel	8th	8	5	3	87	62
2023	United States	10th	8	5	3	79	54
2027	Japan	Qualified					
Total		2/2	16	10	6	166	116

1st place, gold medalist(s)	2nd place, silver medalist(s)	3rd place, bronze medalist(s)	Total
0	0	0	0

== See also ==
- Puerto Rico women's national lacrosse team
