= Lacrosse in India =

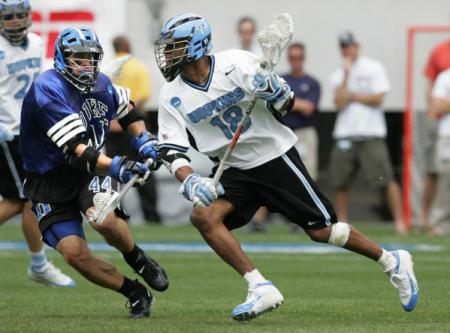
- Country: India
- Governing body: Lacrosse Association of India
- National team: India
- First played: 1800s

Lacrosse is a sport that has a long history in India, though it has not spread widely. The sport was initially introduced in the country by British soldiers in the 1800s. It then spread to other parts of the country, including Punjab and Kashmir. The first All India Lacrosse Championship was held in Amritsar in the year 1936. After that, it lost popularity to sports like hockey. Developmental activities like workshops and awareness programmes have been organised since 2018. There has been an increase in interest in Lacrosse in India since the sport was included in the Summer Olympics. Lacrosse gear is currently being imported, efforts are on to try to manufacture the equipment in India. It is now being played in schools in Shillong, Meghalaya. The sport is administered by the Lacrosse Association of India, which was granted associate membership of World Lacrosse in 2021.
