= Kenya Lacrosse Federation =

Sports governing body in Kenya

- Sport: Lacrosse
- Jurisdiction: Kenya
- Abbreviation: KLF
- Affiliation: World Lacrosse
- Affiliation date: 2016
- Regional affiliation: AAL (Africa)
- Affiliation date: 2022
- President: Cosmas Nabungolo
- (Kenya)

Kenya Lacrosse Federation (KLF) is the national governing body for the sport of lacrosse in Kenya.

== History ==
Lacrosse was introduced in Kenya around 2007 or 2008 by Wales women's national team playe Storm Trentham. The sports was first popularized in the western part of the country.

The Kenya Lacrosse Association (KLA; later the Kenya Lacrosse Federation or KLF) became a member of the Federation of International Lacrosse (FIL; later World Lacrosse) in December 2015, becoming the second nation in Africa to be a member of the FIL after the Uganda Lacrosse Association.

The first Kenya national team team was the one that competed at the 2019 FIL Women's U-19 World Lacrosse Championship held in Peterborough, Ontario, Canada. They priorly went to Uganda in October 2018, to play their first competitive game.

In 2021, World Lacrosse elevated the KLA's membership to full status. Kenya is among the four founding members of the Africa Association of Lacrosse which was established in early 2022.

In a bid to qualify for the 2028 Summer Olympics, the federation known as the Kenya Lacrosse Federation (KLF) by 2022 have been introducing the sport in high schools and universities in the country. In February 2026, lacrosse was introduced in the Term Two KSSSA National Ball Games.

The Kenya senior women's national team was to play at the 2022 World Lacrosse Women's Championship but later withdrew. In November 2022, the Kenya senior men's national team played against Uganda in a qualifier for the 2023 World Lacrosse Men's Championship.

The KLF will send both a men's and women's lacrosse sixes national teams for the 2026 African Sixes Lacrosse Championships in South Africa, which is an Olympic qualifier.

== National teams ==
- Kenya men's national lacrosse team
- Kenya women's national lacrosse team
  - Under-19 women's national team
- Kenya men's national lacrosse sixes team
- Kenya women's national lacrosse sixes team
