= Reisig =

Reisig is a surname. Notable people with the surname include:

- Christian Karl Reisig (1792–1829), German philologist and linguist
- Darren Reisig (born 1968), Canadian lacrosse player
- Ruben Reisig (born 1996), German-Ghanaian footballer
