= Israel national lacrosse team =

Israel national lacrosse team may refer to:

- Israel men's national lacrosse team
- Israel women's national lacrosse team
