= Israel women's national lacrosse team =

Women's national lacrosse team of Israel

Israel
- WL membership: 2011
- Association: Israel Lacrosse Association
- Confederation: ELF (Europe)

Women's World Championship
- Appearances: 4 (first in 2013)
- Best result: Third place (2026)

European Championship
- Appearances: 3 (first in 2015)
- Best result: Runners-up (2019)
Medal record
World Championship
Bronze medal – third place	2026 Tokyo
European Championship
Silver medal – second place	2019 Israel

The Israel women's national lacrosse team represents Israel at women's field lacrosse events. It is governed by the Israel Lacrosse Association.

They are the 2026 World Lacrosse Women's Championship bronze medalists.

== History ==
The Israel Lacrosse Association (ILA) was founded in 2010 by Scott Neiss. The ILA became an associate member of the Federation of International Lacrosse (FIL; later renamed as World Lacrosse) in April 2011.

The Israel women's national lacrosse team debuted at the festival tournament of the 2012 European Lacrosse Festival in Amsterdam held in parallel to the European Lacrosse Championships.

The program started with players and staff born in North America but with links to Israel. But there has been efforts from the federation to develop players born in Israel.

Israel made their debut at the Women's Lacrosse World Cup in the 2013 edition in Oshawa, Canada. The team was led by coach Lauren Paul Norris. The team finished 8th place, after forfeiting their final playoff game against the Haudenosaunee with the Jewish-majority team choosing to honor the Shabbat.

Norris committed to guiding the team at the 2017 Women's Lacrosse World Cup in Surrey, England. The team finished sixth place.

At the 2026 World Lacrosse Women's Championship in Tokyo, Japan, Israel made their best finish in the international tournament defeating the Haudenosaunee in the bronze medal game. The team was led by head coaches Sophie Bass and Kate Goldstein.

== Competitive record ==
=== World Lacrosse Championship ===
Israel has competed at the World Lacrosse Women's World Championship, formerly the World Cup, since 2013.

Year	Result
(Canada) 2013	8th place
(England) 2017	6th place
(United States) 2022	6th place
(Japan) 2026	(bronze) 3rd place

=== European Lacrosse_Championship ===
Israel has competed at the Women's European Lacrosse Championships since 2015 where they finished 4th.

Year	Result
(Netherlands) 2012	Did not enter
(Czech Republic) 2015	4th place
(Israel) 2019	(silver) 2nd place
