= Philippines women's national lacrosse team =

Philippines
- WL membership: 2014
- Association: Philippines Lacrosse Association
- Confederation: APLU (Asia–Pacific)
- Head coach: Shannon Nee

World Championship
- Appearances: 1 (first in 2026)
- Best result: Tenth place (2026)

Asia Pacific Championship
- Appearances: 1 (first in 2025)
- Best result: Third place (2025)

The Philippines women's national lacrosse team is the national team that represents the Philippines in international lacrosse competitions. It is organized by the Philippines Lacrosse Association, a full member of World Lacrosse and an associate member of the Asia Pacific Lacrosse Union.

== History ==
The Philippines Lacrosse Association appointed associate coach Steph Lazo as head coach of the Philippines women's national lacrosse team in February 2024.

The Philippines made its debut at the 2025 Asia-Pacific Championship in Queensland, Australia. By finishing third, the team qualified for the 2026 World Championship in Japan. The Philippines finished tenth in Tokyo, losing to Argentina in the final playoff in overtime.

== Competitive record ==
=== World Lacrosse Championship ===
Year	Host	GP	W	L	GF	GA	Finish
2017	England	Did not enter					−
2022	United States	Did not enter					−
2026	Japan	5	2	3	44	39	10th
Total	−	5	2	3	44	39	No Medal

=== Asia-Pacific Lacrosse Championship ===
Year	Host	GP	W	L	GF	GA	Finish
2025	Australia	5	3	2	56	38	3rd place, bronze medalist(s)
Total	−	5	3	2	5	38	1 bronze

== Head coaches ==
- (Philippines) Steph Lazo (2024–2025)
- (United States) Shannon Nee (2026–present)
