= 2015 Israel Premier Lacrosse League season =

Season of the Israel Premier Lacrosse League

2015 IPLL season
- League: Israel Premier Lacrosse League
- Sport: Field lacrosse
- Duration: July 2015
- Teams: 4

2015
- Finals champions: Barak Netanya LC
- Runners-up: Haifa LC

IPLL seasons
- 2016 season →

The 2015 Israel Premier Lacrosse League season was the 1st and inaugural season of Israel Premier Lacrosse League.

Barak Netanya LC won the IPLL Championship with a win over Haifa LC, with Bryan Hopper winning the EL AL Player of the Game award. A total of 16 games were played, with each team playing eight games.

== Standings ==
Pos	Team	Pld	W	L
1	Barak Netanya LC	8	6	2
2	Haifa LC	8	6	2
3	Ashkelon LC	8	3	5
4	Tel Aviv LC	8	1	7

== Results ==
Game	Date	Home	Score	Away	Venue
1	July 6, 2015	Haifa LC	8 - 7	Ashkelon LC	Ashdod Sport Club
2	July 8, 2015	Tel Aviv LC	7 - 11	Netanya LC	Nave Golan Sports Center
3	July 9, 2015	Haifa LC	9 - 4	Tel Aviv LC	Shapira Field
4	July 9, 2015	Netanya LC	10 - 6	Ashkelon LC	Shapira Field
5	July 13, 2015	Ashkelon LC	8 - 7	Tel Aviv LC	New Municipal Stadium
6	July 14, 2015	Netanya LC	7 - 8	Haifa LC	Shapira Field
7	July 16, 2015	Tel Aviv LC	8 - 7	Netanya LC	New Municipal Stadium
8	July 16, 2015	Haifa LC	6 - 4	Ashkelon LC	New Municipal Stadium
9	July 19, 2015	Ashkelon LC	11 - 8	Tel Aviv LC	Shapira Field
10	July 20, 2015	Netanya LC	6 - 5	Haifa LC	Shapira Field
11	July 22, 2015	Ashkelon LC	7 - 10	Netanya LC	Wolfson Fields
12	July 22, 2015	Tel Aviv LC	8 - 9	Haifa LC	Wolfson Fields
13	July 27, 2015	Ashkelon LC	9 - 13	Netanya LC	Shapira Field
14	July 28, 2015	Tel Aviv LC	5 - 8	Haifa LC	Kiryat Gat Synthetic
15	July 30, 2015	Ashkelon LC	13 - 8	Tel Aviv LC	New Municipal Stadium
16	July 30, 2015	Netanya LC	12 - 7	Haifa LC	New Municipal Stadium

== Player award ==
Name	Award
Ted Bergman	EL AL League MVP
Mitch Goldberg	STX Offensive Player of the Year
Noah Knopf	Bank Hapoalim Defensive Player of the Year
Sacha Stout	Sticks For Kids Sportsmanship Award
Yotam Drori	IPLL Rookie of the Year

== First Team All-Israel ==
Name	Team	Position
Justin Diamond	Haifa	Forward
Mitch Goldberg	Ashkelon	Forward
Jesse Parker	Barak Netanya	Forward
Nate Archer	Haifa	Midfield
Matthew Flapan	Tel Aviv	Midfield
Bryan Hopper	Barak Netanya	Midfield
Evan Kalish	Ashkelon	Defense
Noah Knopf	Tel Aviv	Defense
Austin Wolf	Barak Netanya	Defense
Ted Bergman	Haifa	Goal
Max Friend	Haifa	Faceoff
