= Uganda Lacrosse Association =

Sport governing body in Uganda

- Sport: Lacrosse
- Jurisdiction: Uganda
- Abbreviation: ULA
- Affiliation: World Lacrosse
- Affiliation date: 2011
- Regional affiliation: AAL (Africa)
- Affiliation date: 2022
- Headquarters: Kampala

Official website
- ugandalacrosse.ug
- (Uganda)

The Uganda Lacrosse Association (ULA) is the national governing body for the sport of lacrosse in Uganda. It is registered with the National Council of Sports (NCS).

== History ==
The Uganda Lacrosse Association was originally known as the Uganda Lacrosse Union (ULU).

The ULA became an associate member of what was then the Federation of International Lacrosse (now World Lacrosse) in 2011. ULA organized a men's national team that debuted at the World Lacrosse Championship in the 2014 edition. They were the first African team to play in the World Championship.

In November 2020, ULA became a full member of World Lacrosse becoming the first from Africa to do so. Uganda is among the four founding members of the Africa Association of Lacrosse which was established in early 2022. Meanwhile, a Uganda women's national team was supposed to debut at the 2022 World Lacrosse Women's Championship but withdrew due to visa issues.

However, ULA faced a two year governance issues with World Lacrosse imposing a ban. This was lifted in 2026, giving way for Uganda's potential return to international play. They will be fielding both a men's and women's national lacrosse sixes teams at the 2026 African Sixes Lacrosse Championships.

== Tournaments ==
The association organises domestic competitions including the Uganda Lacrosse Men and Women's League, the Uganda Lacrosse Kings Cup and the Uganda Lacrosse Kelly Cup.

== National teams ==
- Uganda men's national lacrosse team
- Uganda women's national lacrosse team
- Uganda men's national lacrosse sixes team
- Uganda women's national lacrosse sixes team
