= 2027 World Lacrosse Men's Championship =

Tournament details
- Host country: Japan
- Venues: 2 (in 1 host city)
- Dates: June 18 – 27, 2027
- Teams: 16 (main)

The 2027 World Lacrosse Men's Championship, the 15th Men's World Championship is the preeminent international men's lacrosse tournament. The tournament will be hosted in Japan.

This will be the first time Japan hosts the tournament.

== Participating nations ==
Continental championships will serve as the qualification path form the 16 participating teams. Japan as hosts automatically qualifies.

Qualification	Hosts	Date(s)	Spot(s)	Qualifier(s)
Host nation	N/A	January 2024	1	Japan
2025 Men's European Lacrosse Championship	(Poland) Wrocław	9–19 July	7	Israel; Italy; England; Ireland; Latvia; Czech Republic; Germany
Asia-Pacific Men's Lacrosse Championship	(New Zealand) Upper Hutt	6–11 January	3	Australia; Philippines; New Zealand
Pan-American Men's Lacrosse Championship	(Jamaica) Kingston	16-23 August	5	Canada; United States; Haudenosaunee; Jamaica; Puerto Rico

== Venues ==
The 2027 World Lacrosse Men's Championship has two venues in Tokyo: Oi Hockey Stadium and the Chichibunomiya Rugby Stadium with the latter hosting the semifinals and medal round.

Tokyo
Oi Hockey Stadium	Chichibunomiya Rugby Stadium
Capacity: 15,000	Capacity: 27,188

== See also ==
- 2026 World Lacrosse Women's Championship
