= 2016 Israel Premier Lacrosse League season =

Season of the Israel Premier Lacrosse League

2016 IPLL season
- League: Israel Premier Lacrosse League
- Sport: Field lacrosse
- Duration: June - July 2016
- Teams: 6

2016
- Finals champions: Be'er Sheva LC
- Runners-up: Haifa LC

IPLL seasons
- ← 2015 season 2017 season →

The 2016 Israel Premier Lacrosse League season was the 2nd season of Israel Premier Lacrosse League.

Tel Aviv LC decided to suspend operations for the 2016 season, however Ashdod LC, Kiryat Gat LC, and Be'er Sheva LC joined the league for the 2016 season. A total of 22 games were played, with each team playing either seven or eight games.

Be'er Sheva defeated Haifa in the finals 11:10 for the championship.

== Standings ==
Pos	Team	Pld	W	L	PF	PA	PD	Pts
1	Be'er Sheva LC	7	6	1	68	53	+15	6
2	Haifa LC	7	5	2	70	26	+44	5
3	Ashkelon LC	8	5	3	64	63	+1	5
4	Ashdod LC	7	4	3	52	48	+4	4
5	Barak Netanya LC	7	1	6	45	75	−30	1
6	Kiryat Gat LC	8	1	7	44	78	−34	1

== Results ==
Game	Date	Home	Away	Stadium	Result
1	26.6	Be'er Sheva LC	Haifa LC		5:4 (1:1, 1:1, 1:1, 1:1, 1:0)
2	27.6	Ashkelon LC	Barak Netanya LC		11:8 (2:3, 0:3, 2:2, 7:0)
3	28.6	Kiryat Gat LC	Ashdod LC		6:8 (0:1, 2:2, 2:3, 2:2)
5	29.6	Haifa LC	Kiryat Gat LC		12:0 (3:0, 3:0, 5:0, 1:0)
4	29.6	Be'er Sheva LC	Ashkelon LC		7:8 (3:0, 2:2, 1:3, 1:2, 0:1)
6	29.6	Ashdod LC	Barak Netanya LC		10:4 (4:1, 4:1, 2:0, 0:2)
7	6.7	Barak Netanya LC	Be'er Sheva LC	Shapira Field	6:10 (0:4, 1:3, 2:2, 3:1)
8	4.7	Ashkelon LC	Kiryat Gat LC	New Municipal Stadium	11:6 (11:6, 0:0, 0:0, 0:0)
9	5.7	Ashdod LC	Haifa LC	Ashdod Sport Club	3:9 (1:1, 1:2, 1:1, 0:5)
10	7.7	Be'er Sheva LC	Ashdod LC	Kiryat Gat Synthetic	9:8 (3:2, 2:1, 3:3, 1:2)
11	7.7	Haifa LC	Ashkelon LC	Kiryat Gat Synthetic	8:0 (3:0, 3:0, 1:0, 1:0)
12	7.7	Kiryat Gat LC	Barak Netanya LC	Kiryat Gat Synthetic	5:7 (0:0, 2:3, 3:2, 0:2)
13	10.7	Barak Netanya LC	Haifa LC	Tubruq Field	4:16 (0:3, 1:7, 2:4, 1:2)
14	11.7	Ashkelon LC	Ashdod LC	New Municipal Stadium	3:7 (0:1, 1:3, 1:2, 1:1)
15	12.7	Kiryat Gat LC	Be'er Sheva LC	Kiryat Gat Synthetic	10:12 (1:3, 3:3, 1:3, 5:3)
16	14.7	Ashdod LC	Kiryat Gat LC	New Municipal Stadium	4:10 (1:1, 1:3, 1:6, 1:0)
17	14.7	Ashkelon LC	Barak Netanya LC	New Municipal Stadium	11:9 (2:0, 3:4, 3:1, 3:4)
18	17.7	Haifa LC	Kiryat Gat LC	Kiryat Gat Synthetic	11:3 (5:1, 2:2, 4:0, 0:0)
19	18.7	Be'er Sheva LC	Ashkelon LC	Be'er Sheva Sports Center	14:7 (4:3, 6:1, 1:1, 3:2)
20	20.7	Ashdod LC	Barak Netanya LC	Wolfson Fields	12:7 (1:2, 3:2, 6:1, 2:2)
21	20.7	Ashkelon LC	Kiryat Gat LC	Wolfson Fields	13:4 (2:2, 2:1, 5:0, 3:1, 1:0)
22	20.7	Be'er Sheva LC	Haifa LC	Wolfson Fields	11:10 (3:1, 0:1, 2:3, 5:5, 1:0)

== Player awards ==
Name	Award
Ian Kadish	EL AL League MVP
Zachary Penfil	STX Offensive Player of the Year
Max Gradinger	Bank Hapoalim Defensive Player of the Year
Brandon Mager	Sticks For Kids Sportsmanship Award
Lidor Ashtamkar	IPLL Rookie of the Year
Ivan Cohen	IPLL Coach of the Year

== Team All-Israel ==
Name	Team	Position
Caleb Brodie	Ashkelon	Forward
Drew Gallant	Barak Netanya	Forward
Drew Saltzman	Ashkelon	Forward
Ian Kadish	Be’er Sheva	Midfield
Yochanan Katz	Haifa	Midfield
Mitch Turley	Kiryat Gat	Midfield
Chris Friedman	Haifa	Defense
Max Gradinger	Ashdod	Defense
Jacob Hymowitz	Be’er Sheva	Defense
Kiryat Gat	Dan Kaufman	Goal
Zachary Penfil	Ashdod	Faceoff
