= Argentina women's national lacrosse team =

Argentina
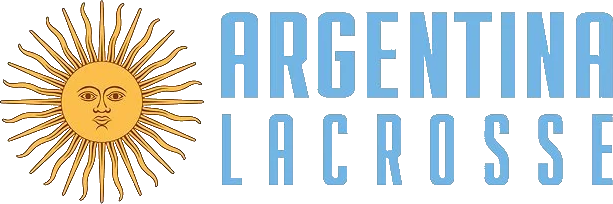
- WL membership: 2002
- Association: Argentina Lacrosse Association
- Head coach: Nicolás Prandi

World Championship
- Appearances: 2 (first in 2026)
- Best result: Ninth place (2026)

The Argentina women's national lacrosse team is the national team that represents the Argentina in international lacrosse competitions. It is organized by the Argentina Lacrosse Association.

== History ==
The Argentina Lacrosse Association, has been a member of World Lacrosse since 2002, becoming a full member in 2017. The federation decided to form its first women's national lacrosse team in 2018. Former men's Argentine player Nicolás Prandi was tasked to build a women's team as its coach.

Argentina qualified for its first ever World Lacrosse Women's Championship in the 2022 edition held in Towson in the United States. It finished 26th place.

The team qualified again in the reduced 16-team 2026 World Lacrosse Women's Championship in Tokyo. They finished ninth place, defeating the Philippines in their final playoff game in overtime.

== Competitive record ==
=== World Lacrosse Championship ===
Year	Host	GP	W	L	GF	GA	Finish
2022	United States	6	2	6	64	97	26th
2026	Japan	5	3	2	43	61	9th
Total	−	11	5	8	107	158	No Medal
