= South African Lacrosse Association =

Sports governing body in South Africa

- Sport: Lacrosse
- Jurisdiction: National
- Abbreviation: SALA
- Founded: 2020
- Affiliation: World Lacrosse
- Affiliation date: 2021
- Regional affiliation: AAL (Africa)
- Affiliation date: 2022
- President: Chris Boushy

Official website
- salacrosse.co.za
- (South Africa)

The South African Lacrosse Association (SALA) is the governing body for the sport of lacrosse in South Africa.

== History ==
=== South African Lacrosse Project ===
Lacrosse in South Africa can be traced to the South African Lacrosse Project (SALP) which was started by volunteers in 2007. It is led by brothers Kip and Harrison Hart and their mother Barbara Cox. It promoted the sport in Limpopo and Johannesburg. SALP ended around 2017.

=== Establishment of a federation ===
In its place, the South African Lacrosse Association (SALA) was established in 2020 by professional lacrosse player Chris Boushy who became the federation's first president. SALA became a member of World Lacrosse in 2021. South Africa is among the four founding members of the Africa Association of Lacrosse which was formed in 2022.

South Africa's women's national team made their debut at the Home Internationals in Scotland in April 2025. They played in the Women's Senior B division. They also finished ninth at the 2026 World Lacrosse Women's Championship Division II in Poland.

The country is also set to host the 2026 African Sixes Lacrosse Championships in Johannesburg in December 2026. The host will field both a men's and women's lacrosse sixes team.
