= 2026 World Lacrosse Women's Championship =

Tournament details
- Host country: Japan
- Venues: 2 (in Tokyo host cities)
- Dates: July 24 – August 2, 2026
- Teams: 16

Final positions
- Champions: United States (10th title)
- Runners-up: Canada
- Third place: Israel
- Fourth place: Haudenosaunee

Tournament statistics
- Games played: 44
- Scoring leader(s): (Israel) Jordyn Lipkin (19 goals)

Awards
- MVP: (United States) Ally Kennedy

The 2026 World Lacrosse Women's Championship, the 12th Women's World Championship, is the preeminent international women's lacrosse tournament. The tournament was hosted in Tokyo, Japan.

This is the second time, Japan is hosting the tournament with the first being the 1997 Women's Lacrosse World Cup.

A new format is adopted for this championship with 16 national teams taking part in the main tournament. A Division II was also held in Wrocław, Poland, with 12 additional teams.

The United States won their fifth consecutive and tenth overall titles, after defeated Canada 16–4 in the final.

== Participating nations ==
=== Qualification ===
Continental championships served as the qualification path form the 16 participating teams. Japan as hosts automatically qualifies. Chinese Taipei and the Philippines made their debuts.

Qualification	Hosts	Date(s)	Spot(s)	Qualifier(s)
Host nation	N/A	January 2024	1	Japan
2024 Women's European Lacrosse Championship	(Portugal) Braga	10–20 July	7	England; Israel; Scotland; Wales; Ireland; Germany; Czech Republic
2025 Asia-Pacific Women's Lacrosse Championship	(Australia) Sunshine Coast	6–11 January	3	Chinese Taipei; Australia; Philippines
2025 Pan-American Women's Lacrosse Championship	(United States) Auburndale	26–30 June	5	United States; Canada; Haudenosaunee; Puerto Rico; Argentina

=== Draw ===
World Lacrosse announced the results of a draw on March 19, 2026. The teams were seeded based on their performance in the 2022 World Lacrosse Women's Championship and the continental championships within the past two years. The top seeds were United States, Canada, England and Japan which were allocated across Pools A to D.

Pool A	Pool B	Pool C	Pool D
Haudenosaunee	Australia	Argentina	Czech Republic
Ireland	Canada	England	Israel
Chinese Taipei	Germany	Puerto Rico	Japan
United States	Wales	Scotland	Philippines

== Venues ==
The 2026 World Lacrosse Women's Championship has two venues in Tokyo: Oi Hockey Stadium and the Chichibunomiya Rugby Stadium with the latter hosting the semifinals and medal round.

Tokyo		2026 World Lacrosse Women's Championship is located in Tokyo
Oi Hockey Stadium	Chichibunomiya Rugby Stadium	2026 World Lacrosse Women's Championship is located in Tokyo
Capacity: 15,000	Capacity: 27,188	2026 World Lacrosse Women's Championship is located in Tokyo

== Marketing ==
Nissin Foods was named the title sponsor of the tournament in January 2026. The logo was also unveiled at the same time which features a design incorporating the red rising sun, Mount Fuji and seigaiha (wave) patterns.

== Group stage ==
=== Pool A ===
Pos	Team	Pld	W	L	PF	PA	PD	Qualification
1	United States	3	3	0	60	12	+48	Advance to Quarterfinals
2	Haudenosaunee	3	2	1	29	37	−8	Advance to Quarterfinals
3	Ireland	3	1	2	25	40	−15	Advance to 9th–12th place games
4	Chinese Taipei	3	0	3	19	44	−25	Advance to 13th–16th place games

Source: World Lacrosse

July 25, 2026; 9:04	Ireland	5–18 (1–5, 1–4, 1–5, 2–4)	United States	Oi Hockey Stadium, Tokyo

Game reference

July 25, 2026; 9:04	Haudenosaunee	11–8 (4–1, 2–2, 2–3, 3–2)	Chinese Taipei	Oi Hockey Stadium, Tokyo

Game reference

July 26, 2026; 9:00	United States	22–5 (6–0, 7–0, 4–4, 5–1)	Haudenosaunee	Oi Hockey Stadium, Tokyo

Game reference

July 26, 2026; 9:00	Chinese Taipei	9–13 (2–2, 2–3, 1–5, 4–3)	Ireland	Oi Hockey Stadium, Tokyo

Game reference

July 28, 2026; 18:30	Chinese Taipei	2–20 (0–6, 1–8, 1–5, 0–1)	United States	Oi Hockey Stadium, Tokyo

Game reference

July 28, 2026; 18:30	Haudenosaunee	13–7 (5–2, 2–2, 1–3, 5–0)	Ireland	Oi Hockey Stadium, Tokyo

Game reference

=== Pool B ===
Pos	Team	Pld	W	L	PF	PA	PD	Qualification
1	Canada	3	3	0	57	12	+45	Advance to Quarterfinals
2	Australia	3	2	1	45	25	+20	Advance to Quarterfinals
3	Wales	3	1	2	19	40	−21	Advance to 9th–12th place games
4	Germany	3	0	3	15	59	−44	Advance to 13th–16th place games

Source: World Lacrosse

July 25, 2026; 16:05	Wales	11–10 (OT) (4–3, 2–4, 3–1, 1–2, 1–0)	Germany	Oi Hockey Stadium, Tokyo

Game reference

July 26, 2026; 19:00	Germany	0–23 (0–9, 0–7, 0–4, 0–3)	Canada	Oi Hockey Stadium, Tokyo

Game reference

July 26, 2026; 19:10	Australia	9–7 (2–3, 2–1, 2–0, 3–3)	Wales	Oi Hockey Stadium, Tokyo

Game reference

July 27, 2026 (Note: Originally scheduled on July 25. Rescheduled due to lightning delays at the venue.); 12:30	Canada	13–11 (4–2, 2–4, 3–4, 4–1)	Australia	Oi Hockey Stadium, Tokyo

Game reference

July 28, 2026; 15:30	Wales	1–21 (0–7, 0–5, 1–5, 0–4)	Canada	Oi Hockey Stadium, Tokyo

Game reference

July 28, 2026; 15:30	Australia	25–5 (7–2, 6–1, 5–1, 7–1)	Germany	Oi Hockey Stadium, Tokyo

Game reference

=== Pool C ===
Pos	Team	Pld	W	L	PF	PA	PD	Qualification
1	England	3	3	0	56	15	+41	Advance to Quarterfinals
2	Puerto Rico	3	2	1	33	35	−2	Advance to Quarterfinals
3	Argentina	3	1	2	24	44	−20	Advance to 9th–12th place games
4	Scotland	3	0	3	30	49	−19	Advance to 13th–16th place games

Source: World Lacrosse

July 25, 2026; 16:05	England	15–8 (3–0, 4–3, 4–3, 4–2)	Puerto Rico	Oi Hockey Stadium, Tokyo

Game reference

July 26, 2026; 12:00	Scotland	12–15 (3–4, 5–3, 3–3, 1–5)	Argentina	Oi Hockey Stadium, Tokyo

Game reference

July 27, 2026; 15:30	England	20–5 (6–2, 3–3, 6–0, 5–0)	Scotland	Oi Hockey Stadium, Tokyo

Game reference

July 27, 2026; 15:30	Puerto Rico	11–7 (2–3, 4–2, 2–2, 3–0)	Argentina	Oi Hockey Stadium, Tokyo

Game reference

July 28, 2026; 9:00	Argentina	2–21 (0–6, 1–7, 0–5, 1–3)	England	Oi Hockey Stadium, Tokyo

Game reference

July 28, 2026; 9:00	Scotland	13–14 (2–7, 1–3, 5–2, 5–2)	Puerto Rico	Oi Hockey Stadium, Tokyo

Game reference

=== Pool D ===
Pos	Team	Pld	W	L	PF	PA	PD	Qualification
1	Israel	3	3	0	43	23	+20	Advance to Quarterfinals
2	Japan (H)	3	2	1	39	23	+16	Advance to Quarterfinals
3	Philippines	3	1	2	24	26	−2	Advance to 9th–12th place games
4	Czech Republic	3	0	3	18	52	−34	Advance to 13th–16th place games

Source: World Lacrosse
(H) Hosts

July 24, 2026; 18:30	Japan	21–5 (6–1, 3–1, 7–1, 5–2)	Czech Republic	Oi Hockey Stadium, Tokyo

Game reference

July 24, 2026; 18:30	Israel	12–6 (3–2, 4–2, 4–1, 1–1)	Philippines	Oi Hockey Stadium, Tokyo

Game reference

July 26, 2026; 15:30	Philippines	7–9 (3–1, 3–2, 1–3, 0–3)	Japan	Oi Hockey Stadium, Tokyo

Game reference

July 26, 2026; 16:27	Czech Republic	8–20 (1–6, 2–2, 3–5, 2–7)	Israel	Oi Hockey Stadium, Tokyo

Game reference

July 27, 2026; 18:30	Japan	9–11 (3–1, 2–4, 4–4, 0–2)	Israel	Oi Hockey Stadium, Tokyo

Game reference

July 27, 2026; 18:30	Czech Republic	5–11 (1–1, 0–5, 1–1, 3–4)	Philippines	Oi Hockey Stadium, Tokyo

Game reference

== 9th–16th placement round ==
=== Places 9–12 ===
9th–12th games
A3	Ireland	9
C3	Argentina	10
B3	Wales	4
D3	Philippines	12

9th position game
D3	Philippines	8
C3	Argentina	9 (OT)
11th position game
A3	Ireland	12
B3	Wales	8

July 30, 2026; 15:30	Ireland	9–10 (3–4, 2–3, 3–1, 1–2)	Argentina	Oi Hockey Stadium, Tokyo

Game reference

July 30, 2026; 20:00	Wales	4–12 (1–3, 0–1, 0–4, 3–4)	Philippines	Oi Hockey Stadium, Tokyo

Game reference

==== Ninth place game ====
August 1, 2026; 18:30	Philippines	8–9 (OT) (3–1, 1–3, 1–2, 3–2, 0–1)	Argentina	Oi Hockey Stadium, Tokyo

Game reference

==== Eleventh place game ====
August 1, 2026; 15:30	Ireland	12–8 (4–2, 3–1, 2–3, 3–2)	Wales	Oi Hockey Stadium, Tokyo

Game reference

=== Places 13–16 ===
13th–16th games
A4	Chinese Taipei	7
C4	Scotland	12
B4	Germany	1
D4	Czech Republic	13

13th position game
C4	Scotland	11
D4	Czech Republic	15
15th position game
B4	Germany	8
A4	Chinese Taipei	11

July 30, 2026; 9:00	Chinese Taipei	7–12 (3–2, 2–5, 2–3, 0–2)	Scotland	Oi Hockey Stadium, Tokyo

Game reference

July 30, 2026; 9:00	Germany	1–13 (1–2, 0–4, 0–3, 0–4)	Czech Republic	Oi Hockey Stadium, Tokyo

Game reference

==== Thirteenth place game ====
August 1, 2026; 9:00	Scotland	11–15 (4–5, 4–2, 0–5, 3–3)	Czech Republic	Oi Hockey Stadium, Tokyo

Game reference

==== Fifteenth place game ====
August 1, 2026; 9:00	Germany	8–11 (1–5, 1–2, 5–2, 1–2)	Chinese Taipei	Oi Hockey Stadium, Tokyo

Game reference

== Final round ==
Fifth place
August 1 – Oi
C1	England	8 (OT)
B2	Australia	7
Seventh place
August 1 – Oi
D2	Japan	17
C2	Puerto Rico	11

5th–8th placement
July 30 – Oi
D2	Japan	5
C1	England	10
July 30 – Oi
B2	Australia	10
C2	Puerto Rico	9

Quarterfinals
July 29 – Oi
B1	Canada	5 (OT)
D2	Japan	4
July 29 – Oi
C1	England	9
A2	Haudenosaunee	10
July 29 – Oi
D1	Israel	12
B2	Australia	11
July 29 – Oi
A1	United States	23
C2	Puerto Rico	4

Semi-finals
July 31 – Chichibu
B1	Canada	18
A2	Haudenosaunee	5
July 31 – Chichibu
D1	Israel	7
A1	United States	19

Final
August 2 – Chichibu
B1	Canada	4
A1	United States	16
Third place game
August 2 – Chichibu
A2	Haudenosaunee	4
D1	Israel	7

=== Quarterfinals ===
July 29, 2026; 15:30	England	9–10 (3–4, 2–2, 3–0, 1–4)	Haudenosaunee	Oi Hockey Stadium, Tokyo

Game reference

July 29, 2026; 18:30	Israel	12–11 (3–4, 3–4, 3–2, 3–1)	Australia	Oi Hockey Stadium, Tokyo

Game reference

July 29, 2026; 18:30	United States	23–4 (6–0, 6–2, 6–0, 5–2)	Puerto Rico	Oi Hockey Stadium, Tokyo

Game reference

July 29, 2026; 19:00	Canada	5–4 (OT) (0–1, 0–1, 3–1, 1–1, 1-0)	Japan	Oi Hockey Stadium, Tokyo

Game reference

=== 5th–8th placement ===
==== Places 5–8 ====
July 30, 2026; 15:30	Australia	10–9 (2–1, 3–3, 2–2, 3–3)	Puerto Rico	Oi Hockey Stadium, Tokyo

Game reference

July 30, 2026; 18:30	Japan	5–10 (1–3, 2–3, 2–2, 0–2)	England	Oi Hockey Stadium, Tokyo

Game reference

==== Seventh place game ====
August 1, 2026; 15:30	Japan	17–11 (2–4, 6–3, 4–3, 5–1)	Puerto Rico	Oi Hockey Stadium, Tokyo

Game reference

==== Fifth place game ====
August 1, 2026; 18:30	England	8–7 (OT) (4–1, 1–1, 1–2, 1–3, 1–0)	Australia	Oi Hockey Stadium, Tokyo

Game reference

=== Semifinals ===
July 31, 2026; 16:00	Canada	18–5 (7–1, 3–2, 2–2, 6–0)	Haudenosaunee	Chichibunomiya Rugby Stadium, Tokyo

Game reference

July 31, 2026; 19:00	Israel	7–19 (3–4, 1–6, 2–2, 1–7)	United States	Chichibunomiya Rugby Stadium, Tokyo

Game reference

=== Third place game ===
August 2, 2026; 16:00	Israel	7–4 (3–0, 3–1, 1–1, 0–2)	Haudenosaunee	Chichibunomiya Rugby Stadium, Tokyo

Game reference

=== Final ===
August 2, 2026; 19:00	United States	16–4 (2–0, 6–1, 6–1, 2–2)	Canada	Chichibunomiya Rugby Stadium, Tokyo

Game reference

== Final ranking ==
Rank	Team	Record
Gold medal	United States	6–0
Silver medal	Canada	5–1
Bronze medal	Israel	5–1
4th	Haudenosaunee	3–3
5th	England	5–1
6th	Australia	3–3
7th	Japan	3–3
8th	Puerto Rico	2–4
9th	Argentina	3–2
10th	Philippines	2–3
11th	Ireland	2–3
12th	Wales	1–4
13th	Czech Republic	2–3
14th	Scotland	1–4
15th	Chinese Taipei	1–4
16th	Germany	0–5

== All-World Team ==
Attack	Midfield	Defense	Goalkeeper
(Canada) Aurora Cordingley; (United States) Chloe Humphrey; (Israel) Jordyn Lipkin	(United States) Ally Kennedy; (Canada) Erica Evan; (United States) Marie McCool	(Canada) Brooklyn Walker-Welch; (United States) Sydney Scales; (Israel) Racheli Levy-Smith	(United States) Shea Dolce
Source: World Lacrosse

=== Award ===
Most valuable player
(United States) Ally Kennedy

== See also ==
- 2027 World Lacrosse Men's Championship
