= Africa Association of Lacrosse =

Regional governing body for lacrosse

- Sport: Lacrosse
- Jurisdiction: International
- Membership: 15
- Abbreviation: AAL
- Founded: 2022; 4 years ago
- Affiliation: World Lacrosse
- President: Rufus Ntiamoah

The Africa Association of Lacrosse (AAL) is the sport governing body of men and women's lacrosse in Africa. It was founded in 2022.

== History ==
The Lacrosse for All: Africa initiative was started by World Lacrosse in the early 2020s to promote lacrosse in Africa with support from the International Olympic Committee. However there is no confederation covering the continent. The European Lacrosse Federation, the Pan-American Lacrosse Association and the Asia Pacific Lacrosse Union covers the rest of the world.

In early 2022, the Africa Association of Lacrosse (AAL) was established during a meeting in Baltimore in the United States with four founding members: Ghana, Kenya, South Africa and Uganda. Rufus Ntiamoah of the Ghana Lacrosse Association was elected as the first AAL president. Seven more nations joined within the year, followed by four in the following year.

== Members ==
Country	Member Name	Joined
Benin	Fédération Béninoise de Lacrosse	
Botswana	Botswana Lacrosse	2023
Burkina Faso	Fédération Burkina Faso de Lacrosse	
Ghana	Ghana Lacrosse Association	2022
Ivory Coast	Federation of Ivorian Lacrosse	
Kenya	Kenya Lacrosse Federation	2022
Mozambique	Mozambique Lacrosse	2023
Nigeria	Nigerian Lacrosse Association	
Rwanda	Rwanda Lacrosse	
Sierra Leone	Sierra Leone Lacrosse Association	
South Africa	South African Lacrosse Association	2022
Togo	Fédération Togolaise de Lacrosse	
Uganda	Uganda Lacrosse Association	2022
Zambia	Zambia Lacrosse	2023
Zimbabwe	Zimbabwe Lacrosse	2023

== Tournaments ==
- African Sixes Lacrosse Championships
