= 2019 Women's European Lacrosse Championship =

The 2019 Women's Lacrosse European Championship was the 11th edition of this tournament. It was held in Netanya, Israel, from 15 to 25 July 2019.

16 teams joined the tournament. England is the defending champion.

== Format ==
Teams were divided into three groups, being the group A composed by the six best teams in the previous edition. The four first qualified teams would join the championship playoffs.

The rest of the teams would need to achieve a 4–0 balance in their groups for being able to join the playoffs.

The European Championships will also be serving as a qualifier for the FIL World Cup for the first time. 15 of the 16 teams competing in Israel this summer are expected to qualify for the next World Cup.

== Group stage ==
=== Group A ===
| Pos | Team | Pld | W | D | L | GF | GA | GD | Pts | Qualification | (England) | (Wales) | (Israel) | (Republic of Ireland) | (Scotland) | (Germany) |
|---|---|---|---|---|---|---|---|---|---|---|---|---|---|---|---|---|
| 1 | England | 5 | 5 | 0 | 0 | 68 | 20 | +48 | 10 | Qualification to championship bracket | — | 11–6 | — | — | 15–4 | 16–2 |
| 2 | Wales | 5 | 4 | 0 | 1 | 57 | 38 | +19 | 8 | Qualification to championship bracket | — | — | 12–8 | 8–6 | — | 18–5 |
| 3 | Israel (H) | 5 | 3 | 0 | 2 | 48 | 42 | +6 | 6 | Qualification to championship bracket | 3–12 | — | — | — | 12–6 | 13–2 |
| 4 | Ireland | 5 | 2 | 0 | 3 | 41 | 46 | −5 | 4 | Qualification to championship bracket | 5–14 | — | 10–12 | — | 9–4 | — |
| 5 | Scotland | 5 | 1 | 0 | 4 | 38 | 55 | −17 | 2 | Qualification to play-in games | 4–15 | 8–13 | — | — | — | — |
| 6 | Germany | 5 | 0 | 0 | 5 | 23 | 74 | −51 | 0 | Qualification to play-in games | 2–16 | — | — | 8–11 | 6–16 | — |

Source: Pointbench.com
(H) Hosts

=== Group B ===
| Pos | Team | Pld | W | D | L | GF | GA | GD | Pts | Qualification | (Netherlands) | (Norway) | (Latvia) | (Switzerland) | (Italy) |
|---|---|---|---|---|---|---|---|---|---|---|---|---|---|---|---|
| 1 | Netherlands | 4 | 4 | 0 | 0 | 57 | 21 | +36 | 8 | Qualification to championship bracket | — | 11–5 | — | — | 19–6 |
| 2 | Norway | 4 | 3 | 0 | 1 | 36 | 35 | +1 | 6 | Qualification to play-in games | — | — | 9–7 | 12–9 | — |
| 3 | Latvia | 4 | 2 | 0 | 2 | 31 | 36 | −5 | 4 | Qualification to play-in games | 5–12 | — | — | — | 10–7 |
| 4 | Switzerland | 4 | 1 | 0 | 3 | 35 | 42 | −7 | 2 | Qualification to play-in games | 15–5 | — | 8–9 | — | — |
| 5 | Italy | 4 | 0 | 0 | 4 | 27 | 52 | −25 | 0 | Qualification to 13th position group | — | 8–10 | — | 6–13 | — |

Source: Pointbench.com

=== Group C ===
| Pos | Team | Pld | W | D | L | GF | GA | GD | Pts | Qualification | (Czech Republic) | (Austria) | (Spain) | (Finland) | (Sweden) |
|---|---|---|---|---|---|---|---|---|---|---|---|---|---|---|---|
| 1 | Czech Republic | 4 | 4 | 0 | 0 | 84 | 10 | +74 | 8 | Qualification to championship bracket | — | 18–8 | — | — | 21–2 |
| 2 | Austria | 4 | 3 | 0 | 1 | 54 | 30 | +24 | 6 | Qualification to play-in games | — | — | 16–4 | 13–5 | — |
| 3 | Spain | 4 | 2 | 0 | 2 | 24 | 57 | −33 | 4 | Qualification to play-in games | 0–23 | — | — | 11–10 | — |
| 4 | Finland | 4 | 1 | 0 | 3 | 24 | 50 | −26 | 2 | Qualification to play-in games | 0–22 | — | — | — | 9–4 |
| 5 | Sweden | 4 | 0 | 0 | 4 | 17 | 56 | −39 | 0 | Qualification to 13th position group | — | 3–17 | 8–9 | — | — |

Source: Pointbench.com

== Playoffs ==
=== Championship bracket ===
Play-in games
Ireland | 10
Czech Republic | 12
Israel | 15
Netherlands | 5

Semi-finals
England | 16
Czech Republic | 10
Wales | 5
Israel | 8

Final
England | 10
Israel | 7
Third place
Czech Republic | 8
Wales | 13

=== 5th position bracket ===
Play-in games
Scotland | 18
Norway | 4
Germany | 11
Austria | 8

Semi-finals
Ireland | 7
Scotland | 10
Netherlands | 7
Germany | 8

Fifth position
Scotland | 19
Germany | 5
Seventh position
Ireland | 12
Netherlands | 7

=== 9th position bracket ===
Play-in games
Spain | 3
Switzerland | 11
Latvia | 16
Finland | 4

Semi-finals
Norway | 9
Switzerland | 3
Austria | 7
Latvia | 8

Ninth position
Norway | 8
Latvia | 9
Eleventh position
Switzerland | 8
Austria | 14

=== 13th position group ===
| Pos | Team | Pld | W | D | L | GF | GA | GD | Pts | (Italy) | (Sweden) | (Spain) | (Finland) |
|---|---|---|---|---|---|---|---|---|---|---|---|---|---|
| 1 | Italy | 3 | 2 | 0 | 1 | 41 | 21 | +20 | 4 | — | 9–11 | 11–3 | 21–7 |
| 2 | Sweden | 3 | 2 | 0 | 1 | 36 | 25 | +11 | 4 | — | — | 7–9 | 18–7 |
| 3 | Spain | 3 | 2 | 0 | 1 | 22 | 22 | 0 | 4 | — | — | — | — |
| 4 | Finland | 3 | 0 | 0 | 3 | 18 | 49 | −31 | 0 | — | — | 4–10 | — |

Source: Pointbench.com

== Final standings ==
| 1st place, gold medalist(s) | England | 7–0 |
| 2nd place, silver medalist(s) | Israel | 5–3 |
| 3rd place, bronze medalist(s) | Wales | 5–2 |
| 4 | Czech Republic | 5–2 |
| 5 | Scotland | 4–4 |
| 6 | Germany | 2–6 |
| 7 | Ireland | 3–5 |
| 8 | Netherlands | 4–3 |
| 9 | Latvia | 5–2 |
| 10 | Norway | 4–3 |
| 11 | Austria | 4–3 |
| 12 | Switzerland | 2–5 |
| 13 | Italy | 2–5 |
| 14 | Sweden | 2–5 |
| 15 | Spain | 4–4 |
| 16 | Finland | 1–7 |
