= Blake Miller (lacrosse) =

American lacrosse player (born 1972)

Personal information
- Nationality: American
- Born: July 9, 1972 (age 54) Manhasset, New York, U.S.
- Height: 6 ft 1 in (185 cm)
- Weight: 195 lb (88 kg; 13 st 13 lb)

Sport
- Position: Midfield
- NLL teams: New York Titans; New York Saints; New Jersey Storm; Anaheim Storm
- MLL team Former teams: Long Island Lizards; Philadelphia Barrage
- Pro career: 1998–unknown

Blake Miller (born July 9, 1972) was a professional lacrosse player from Manhasset, New York. He is an offensive-minded midfielder.

Miller graduated from Hofstra University in 1996 where he was an Honorable Mention All-American.

== MLL career ==
He played for Major League Lacrosse with the Long Island Lizards from 2004 to 2014. He was named the 2004 offensive player of the year and is a three time Major League Lacrosse All Star.

He has also played for Team USA in the World Lacrosse Championships in 1998 and 2006.

== NLL career ==
From 1998 to 2004 played indoor lacrosse in the National Lacrosse League with the New York Saints, New Jersey Storm, and Anaheim Storm. Miller did not play in 2005 or 2006.

In 2007, Miller joined the New York Titans for their inaugural season.

On January 26, 2007, Miller, who usually wears number 26, wore number 27 to honor Nick Colleluori. Colleluori a junior at Hofstra University and was a member of the Hofstra lacrosse team, died from non-Hodgkin's lymphoma in November 2006, wore number 27.
