= 2026 African Sixes Lacrosse Championships =

International lacrosse sixes competition

Tournament details
- Host country: South Africa
- Venue: 1 (in 1 host city)
- Dates: December 2–5, 2026
- Teams: M: 4 W: 3

Final positions
- Champions: M: TBD; W: TBD
- Runners-up: M: TBD; W: TBD
- Third place: M: TBD; W: TBD
- Fourth place: M: TBD

2026 African Sixes Lacrosse Championships is an upcoming men's and women's tournament for lacrosse sixes teams scheduled to be held from December 1 to 5, 2026 in Johannesburg, South Africa. It will be organized by the South African Lacrosse Association for the Africa Association of Lacrosse.

The champions in both the men's and women's tournament will qualify for the 2027 World Lacrosse Sixes Championships which in turn will be used to qualify teams for the 2028 Summer Olympics in Los Angeles.

== Participating teams ==
The tournament will mark Ghana's international debut in lacrosse.

Men's	Women's
Ghana; Kenya; South Africa (hosts); Uganda	Kenya; South Africa (hosts); Uganda

== Venues ==
Games were played at the St Stithians College.

Johannesburg
St Stithians College
2026 African Sixes Lacrosse Championships (South Africa)

== Results ==
=== Men's ===
==== Round robin ====
Pos	Team	Pld	W	L	GF	GA	GD	Qualification
1	Ghana	0	0	0	0	0	0	Gold medal match
2	Kenya	0	0	0	0	0	0	Gold medal match
3	South Africa (H)	0	0	0	0	0	0	Bronze medal match
4	Uganda	0	0	0	0	0	0	Bronze medal match

(H) Hosts

==== Final round ====
Bronze medal match

December 5, 2026; 12:00	R3	12:00	R4

Gold medal match

December 5, 2026; 16:00	R1	16:00	R2

=== Women's ===
==== Round robin ====
Pos	Team	Pld	W	L	GF	GA	GD	Qualification
1	Kenya	0	0	0	0	0	0	Gold medal match
2	South Africa (H)	0	0	0	0	0	0	Gold medal match
3	Uganda	0	0	0	0	0	0	Bronze medal match

(H) Hosts

==== Final round ====
Gold medal match

December 5, 2026; 14:00	R1	14:00	R2
