= 2025 Asia-Pacific Women's Lacrosse Championship =

International lacrosse competition

Tournament details
- Host country: Australia
- Venue: 1 (in 1 host city)
- Teams: 8

Final positions
- Champions: Japan
- Runners-up: Australia
- Third place: Philippines
- Fourth place: Chinese Taipei

The 2025 Asia-Pacific Women's Lacrosse Championship is an international women's lacrosse competition held in Sunshine Coast, Queensland, Australia from 6 to 11 January 2025. The iteration of the Asia-Pacific Lacrosse Championship served as the qualifier for the 2026 World Lacrosse Women's Championship with the top three teams outside host Japan securing a place in the championship

== Venue ==
Sunshine Coast
| Sunshine Coast Stadium | 2025 Asia-Pacific Women's Lacrosse Championship (Queensland) |
| Capacity: 12,500 | 2025 Asia-Pacific Women's Lacrosse Championship (Queensland) |

== Preliminary round ==
=== Pool A ===
| Pos | Team | Pld | W | L | GF | GA | GD | Qualification |
|---|---|---|---|---|---|---|---|---|
| 1 | Australia (H) | 3 | 3 | 0 | 50 | 10 | +40 | Advance to Semifinals |
| 2 | Philippines | 3 | 2 | 1 | 34 | 19 | +15 | Advance to Semifinals |
| 3 | Hong Kong | 3 | 1 | 2 | 16 | 39 | −23 | Advance to consolation round |
| 4 | China | 3 | 0 | 3 | 15 | 47 | −32 | Advance to consolation round |

Source: APLU
(H) Hosts

| 6 January 2025; 10:00 | China | 3–15 | Philippines | Sunshine Coast Stadium, Sunshine Coast |

Game reference

| 6 January 2025; 18:30 | Australia | 16–2 | Hong Kong | Sunshine Coast Stadium, Sunshine Coast |

Game reference

| 7 January 2025; 12:30 | Australia | 20–3 | China | Sunshine Coast Stadium, Sunshine Coast |

Game reference

| 7 January 2025; 18:00 | Hong Kong | 2–14 | Philippines | Sunshine Coast Stadium, Sunshine Coast |

Game reference

| 8 January 2025; 15:30 | China | 9–12 | Hong Kong | Sunshine Coast Stadium, Sunshine Coast |

Game reference

| 8 January 2025; 18:00 | Australia | 14–5 | Philippines | Sunshine Coast Stadium, Sunshine Coast |

Game reference

=== Pool B ===
| Pos | Team | Pld | W | L | GF | GA | GD | Qualification |
|---|---|---|---|---|---|---|---|---|
| 1 | Japan | 3 | 3 | 0 | 45 | 10 | +35 | Advance to Semifinals |
| 2 | Chinese Taipei | 3 | 2 | 1 | 31 | 31 | 0 | Advance to Semifinals |
| 3 | New Zealand | 3 | 1 | 2 | 32 | 30 | +2 | Advance to consolation round |
| 4 | South Korea | 3 | 0 | 3 | 11 | 48 | −37 | Advance to consolation round |

Source: APLU

| 6 January 2025; 12:30 | South Korea | 4–13 | Chinese Taipei | Sunshine Coast Stadium, Sunshine Coast |

Game reference

| 6 January 2025; 15:00 | Japan | 11–4 | New Zealand | Sunshine Coast Stadium, Sunshine Coast |

Game reference

| 7 January 2025; 10:00 | Japan | 17–1 | South Korea | Sunshine Coast Stadium, Sunshine Coast |

Game reference

| 7 January 2025; 15:30 | New Zealand | 10–13 | Chinese Taipei | Sunshine Coast Stadium, Sunshine Coast |

Game reference

| 8 January 2025; 10:00 | South Korea | 6–18 | New Zealand | Sunshine Coast Stadium, Sunshine Coast |

Game reference

| 8 January 2025; 12:30 | Japan | 17–5 | Chinese Taipei | Sunshine Coast Stadium, Sunshine Coast |

Game reference

== Consolation round ==
Consolation semifinals
A3 | Hong Kong | 11
B4 | South Korea | 6
B3 | New Zealand | 13
A4 | China | 7

5th place game
A3 | Hong Kong | 4
B3 | New Zealand | 10
7th place game
B2 | South Korea | 7
A2 | China | 15

=== 5th–8th place ===
| 10 January 2025; 10:00 | Hong Kong | 11–6 | South Korea | Sunshine Coast Stadium, Sunshine Coast |

Game reference

| 10 January 2025; 12:30 | New Zealand | 13–7 | China | Sunshine Coast Stadium, Sunshine Coast |

Game reference

=== 7th place game ===
| 11 January 2025; 10:00 | China | 15–7 | South Korea | Sunshine Coast Stadium, Sunshine Coast |

Game reference

=== 5th place game ===
| 11 January 2025; 15:00 | New Zealand | 10–4 | Hong Kong | Sunshine Coast Stadium, Sunshine Coast |

Game reference

== Final round ==
Semifinals
A1 | Australia | 13
B2 | Chinese Taipei | 4
B1 | Japan | 13
A2 | Philippines | 4

Final
A1 | Australia | 5
B1 | Japan | 9
Bronze medal game
B2 | Chinese Taipei | 6
A2 | Philippines | 18

=== Semifinals ===
| 10 January 2025; 15:30 | Australia | 13–4 | Chinese Taipei | Sunshine Coast Stadium, Sunshine Coast |

Game reference

| 10 January 2025; 18:00 | Japan | 13–4 | Philippines | Sunshine Coast Stadium, Sunshine Coast |

Game reference

=== Bronze medal game ===
| 11 January 2025; 12:30 | Philippines | 18–6 | Chinese Taipei | Sunshine Coast Stadium, Sunshine Coast |

Game reference

=== Final ===
| 11 January 2025; 17:30 | Australia | 5–9 | Japan | Sunshine Coast Stadium, Sunshine Coast |

Game reference

== Final standings ==
| Qualify to the 2026 World Lacrosse Women's Championship as the host country |
| Qualify to the 2026 World Lacrosse Women's Championship via standings |

| Rank | Team |
|---|---|
| 1st place, gold medalist(s) | Japan |
| 2nd place, silver medalist(s) | Australia |
| 3rd place, bronze medalist(s) | Philippines |
| 4 | Chinese Taipei |
| 5 | New Zealand |
| 6 | Hong Kong |
| 7 | China |
| 8 | South Korea |

== See also ==
- 2026 Asia-Pacific Men's Lacrosse Championship
