= Darren Reisig =

Canadian lacrosse player and coach

Personal information
- Nickname: Ziggy
- Nationality: Canadian
- Born: March 23, 1968 (age 58) Victoria, British Columbia, Canada
- Height: 6 ft 1 in (185 cm)
- Weight: 205 lb (93 kg; 14 st 9 lb)

Sport
- Position: Transition
- Shoots: Left
- NLL team Former teams: Portland LumberJax; San Jose Stealth; Vancouver Ravens
- Former WLA team: Victoria Shamrocks
- Pro career: 2002–2007
Medal record
Representing Canada
Men's lacrosse
World Lacrosse Championship
Bronze medal – third place	1994 Bury
Silver medal – second place	1998 Baltimore

Darren Reisig (born March 23, 1968, in Victoria, British Columbia) is a former professional lacrosse player and is currently an assistant coach of the Victoria Shamrocks Junior A team. Darren is also a teacher and athletic director at Claremont Secondary School. He runs the Claremont Sports Institute for aquatics, golf, rowing and lacrosse. Darren is the head coach of the lacrosse program.

Darren also runs the BC's Best Lacrosse Player Showcase tournament which hosts the top 150 high school field lacrosse players in the province, along with coaches representing colleges from all across the U.S. This tournament is usually held in June. In August Darren, and Fred Jenner run Camp Rocks summer field lacrosse camps.

Darren will be inducted. as an athlete, into the Greater Victoria Sports Hall of Fame October 25, 2025.

== NLL career ==
Reisig began his NLL career with the Vancouver Ravens in the 2002 NLL season. He was appointed the Vancouver Ravens' first captain prior to their opening game on November 17, 2001, in Toronto against the Rock. Reisig played for the Ravens until 2004, and has since played for the San Jose Stealth and the Portland LumberJax.

Reisig was named to the North team for the All-Star game in the 2002 NLL season.

== WLA career ==
Reisig played with the Victoria Shamrocks of the Western Lacrosse Association from 1989 to 2003, helping the Shamrocks to Mann Cup national titles in 1997, 1999 and 2003. He was the captain of the Mann Cup-winning Shamrocks in 2003.

== Field Lacrosse ==
- 1985-1998 Victoria Seasprays/Royal Waxmen
- 1994 - Member of Team Canada, 3rd place at the World Lacrosse Championship
- 1998 - Member of Team Canada, 1998 World Lacrosse Championship Final

== Junior lacrosse career ==
Reisig played for the Esquimalt Legion lacrosse team in the BCJALL from 1985 to 1989 and led his teams to league titles in 1985, 1986, 1988 and 1989. In 1987 they actually tied for the league lead in points with the Coquitlam Adanacs. The Esquimalt Legion team won the Provincial Championship consecutively from 1985 through 1988. In 1989 Reisig was named as a first team all-star and was the team top scorer

== Statistics ==
=== NLL ===
		Regular Season						Playoffs
Season	Team	GP	G	A	Pts	LB	PIM	GP	G	A	Pts	LB	PIM
2002	Vancouver	16	8	8	16	94	27	1	0	0	0	6	2
2003	Vancouver	16	5	6	11	64	24	1	0	0	0	6	0
2004	Vancouver	10	3	3	6	41	14	--	--	--	--	--	--
2004	San Jose	3	1	2	3	11	2	1	0	2	2	1	0
2005	San Jose	16	3	4	7	68	30	--	--	--	--	--	--
2006	San Jose	16	5	5	10	47	12	--	--	--	--	--	--
2007	Portland	10	3	5	8	25	4	--	--	--	--	--	--
NLL totals		87	28	33	61	350	113	3	0	2	2	13	2

=== WLA ===
Victoria Payless/Shamrocks
Year	Games	Goals	Assists	Points	Penalty Minutes
2003 Darren Reisig Season	8	2	9	11	10
2003 Darren Reisig Playoffs	9	3	4	7	12
2003 Darren Reisig Mann Cup	5	3	0	3	2
2002 Darren Reisig Season	17	20	19	39	16
2002 Darren Reisig Playoffs	10	9	11	20	10
2002 Darren Reisig Mann Cup	7	2	1	3	6
2001 Darren Reisig Season	17	15	24	39	16
2001 Darren Reisig Playoffs	11	2	13	15	25
2000 Darren Reisig Season	25	19	29	48	30
2000 Darren Reisig Playoffs	9	8	12	20	4
2000 Darren Reisig Mann Cup	4	1	0	1	4
1999 Darren Reisig Season	25	20	23	43	26
1999 Darren Reisig Playoffs	5	2	2	4	14
1999 Darren Reisig Mann Cup	4	1	2	3	4
1998 Darren Reisig Season	21	26	19	45	26
1998 Darren Reisig Playoffs	12	7	11	18	12
1997 Darren Reisig Season	16	14	8	22	6
1997 Darren Reisig Playoffs	11	5	9	14	4
1996 Darren Reisig Season	19	27	26	53	28
1996 Darren Reisig Playoffs	8	8	11	19	2
1996 Darren Reisig Mann Cup	4	1	1	2	5
1995 Darren Reisig Season	25	39	35	74	14
1995 Darren Reisig Playoffs	7	14	11	25	9
1994 Darren Reisig Season	17	11	15	26	13
1994 Darren Reisig Playoffs	6	3	1	4	4
1993 Darren Reisig Season	15	8	5	13	14
1993 Darren Reisig Playoffs	3	0	2	2	2
1992 Darren Reisig Season	24	24	13	37	22
1992 Darren Reisig Playoffs	7	5	1	6	0
1991 Darren Reisig Season	22	9	12	21	22
1991 Darren Reisig Playoffs	5	2	0	2	4
1990 Darren Reisig Season	24	30	13	43	27
1990 Darren Reisig Playoffs	5	5	3	8	4
1989 Darren Reisig Season	1	0	0	0	0
1988 Darren Reisig Season	1	0	0	0	0

=== BC Junior A Lacrosse ===
Esquimalt Legion
Year	Games	Goals	Assists	Points	Penalty Minutes
1989 Darren Reisig Season	22	46	37	83	41
1989 Darren Reisig Playoffs	4	4	3	7	0
1988 Darren Reisig Season	23	12	24	36	44
1988 Darren Reisig Playoffs	5	2	15	17	2
1987 Darren Reisig Season	27	25	40	65	32
1987 Darren Reisig Playoffs	7	7	9	16	10
1987 Darren Reisig Minto Cup	6	2	9	11	0
1986 Darren Reisig Season	3	1	1	2	0
1986 Darren Reisig Playoffs	4	3	6	9	4
1986 Darren Reisig Minto Cup	3	1	1	2	0
1985 Darren Reisig Season	2	0	0	0	0

== Awards ==
- 1987 Esquimalt Legion - Rookie of the Year
- 1989 Esquimalt Legion - Top Scorer
- 1989 BCJALL First Team All-star
- 1995 WLA Three Star Award
- 1995 WLA MVP
- 2023 Canadian Lacrosse Hall of Fame
- 2025 Greater Victoria Sports Hall of Fame
