= Israel Premier Lacrosse League =

Lacrosse league in Israel

- Most recent season or competition: 2016 Israel Premier Lacrosse League season
- Sport: Lacrosse
- Founded: 2014
- Founder: Scott Neiss
- First season: 2015
- Commissioner: Scott Neiss
- No. of teams: 6
- Country: Israel
- Most recent champion: Be'er Sheva LC
- Most titles: Be'er Sheva LC (1); Barak Netanya LC (1)
- Website: lacrosse.co.il

The Israel Premier Lacrosse League (IPLL) is the premier lacrosse league in Israel, which debuted in 2015. The league competes during summer months in an attempt to attract players from abroad. The IPLL says it learned its lesson from the Israel Baseball League, and operates with an eye to financial stability.

== Teams ==
The IPLL had four teams in the 2015 season before expanding to six in 2016, which were:

Team	2015	2016	Notes
Ashdod LC	—N/a	4th	2016 expansion team
Ashkelon LC	3rd	3rd	Third official club -
Barak Netanya LC	1st	5th	Second official club
Be'er Sheva LC	—N/a	1st	2016 expansion team
Haifa LC	2nd	2nd	First official club
Kiryat Gat LC	—N/a	6th	
Tel Aviv LC	4th	—N/a	Fourth official club, suspended operations after 2015.

== Stadiums ==
There are six stadiums used by the IPLL which are:

Field	City
Ashdod Sport Club	Ashdod
New Municipal Stadium	Ashkelon
Mikha Reisser Field	Be’er Sheva
Kiryat Gat Synthetic	Kiryat Gat
Tubruq Field	Netanya
Wolfson Fields	Tel Aviv

== League championships ==
Year	Champion	Runner-up
2015	Barak Netanya LC	Haifa LC
2016	Be'er Sheva LC	Haifa LC

== 2015 season ==
The 2015 season was the inaugural season of the IPLL. Barak Netanya LC won the IPLL Championship with a win over Haifa LC, with Bryan Hopper winning the EL AL Player of the Game award. A total of 16 games were played, with each team playing eight games.

=== Standings ===
Pos	Team	GP	W	L
1	Barak Netanya LC	8	6	2
2	Haifa LC	8	6	2
3	Ashkelon LC	8	3	5
4	Tel Aviv LC	8	1	7

== 2016 season ==
The 2016 season of the IPLL was their second season. Tel Aviv LC decided to suspend operations for the 2016 season, however Ashdod LC, Kiryat Gat LC, and Be'er Sheva LC joined the league for the 2016 season. A total of 22 games were played, with each team playing either seven or eight games. Be'er Sheva defeated Haifa in the finals 11:10 for the championship.

=== Standings ===
Rank	Team	GP	W	L	Score	Points
1	Be'er Sheva LC	7	6	1	68:53	6
2	Haifa LC	7	5	2	70:26	5
3	Ashkelon LC	8	5	3	64:63	5
4	Ashdod LC	7	4	3	52:48	4
5	Barak Netanya LC	7	1	6	45:75	1
6	Kiryat Gat LC	8	1	7	44:78	1

== 2018 season ==
Rank	Team	GP	W	L	Score	Points
1	Be'er Sheva LC	7	6	1	77:64	6
2	Ashkelon LC	7	4	3	72:73	4
3	Haifa LC	7	4	3	63:58	4
4	Barak Netanya LC	7	4	3	67:54	4
5	Herzliya LC	7	4	3	68:61	4
6	Sderot	7	3	4	59:64	3
7	Ashdod LC	7	2	5	55:68	5
8	Kiryat Gat LC	7	1	6	46:65	1
