= Philippines Lacrosse Association =

Governing body of lacrosse in the Philippines

- Sport: Lacrosse
- Jurisdiction: National
- Abbreviation: PLA
- Founded: 2012
- Affiliation: World Lacrosse
- Affiliation date: 2014
- Regional affiliation: APLU
- Affiliation date: 2019
- Headquarters: Bacolod, Philippines
- President: Ron Garcia
- Coach: Kirk Ventriquattro

Official website
- philippineslax.com
- (Philippines)

The Philippines Lacrosse Association (PLA), also known as Philippines Lacrosse, is the governing body of lacrosse in the Philippines and is a full member of World Lacrosse. It organizes the country's men's and women's national teams.

== History ==
The Philippines Lacrosse Association (PLA) was established in September 2012.

Lacrosse was officially introduced in the Philippines in September 2013, when the PLA outreach director Justin Manjares and President Ron Garcia met with Philippine Olympic Committee (POC) and the Philippine Sports Commission (PSA) regarding the lacrosse body's agenda and talked about promoting the sport with the guidance of the POC and PSC.

The Philippines Lacrosse Association became the 50th member of World Lacrosse as voted on February 17, 2014, when the international organization was still known as the Federation of International Lacrosse. It was given full World Lacrosse membership in 2021.

It joined the Asia-Pacific Lacrosse Union in 2019 as an associate member.
