= Singapore Lacrosse Association =

Sports association in Singapore

The Singapore Lacrosse Association (SLA) is the organization that focuses on the growth of lacrosse development in Singapore. Formed in October 2012, the SLA became the 47th member of the Federation of International Lacrosse on 30 July 2013.
