= Spain women's national lacrosse team =

National sports team

Spain
- Association: Spanish Lacrosse Association
- Confederation: ELF (Europe)

World Cup
- Appearances: 1 (first in 2017)
- Best result: 23rd

European Championship
- Appearances: 2 (first in 2015)
- Best result: 15th

First international
- Spain 3–8 Sweden (6 August 2015; Nymburk, Czech Republic)

Biggest win
- Spain 16–4 China (18 July 2017; Guildford, England)

Biggest defeat
- Spain 1–27 Japan (16 July 2017; Guildford, England)

The Spain women's national lacrosse team represents Spain at women's field lacrosse events. It is governed by the Spanish Lacrosse Association.

== Squad ==
The following players will be called for the 2017 Women's Lacrosse World Cup in England.

Pos.	No.	Player
G	21	Katrina Reeves
M	1	Marina Burke
M	2	Raquel Barreda
M	4	Beatriz de la Fuente
A	4	Beatriz de la Fuente
A	8	Marta Rodríguez
D	9	Teresa Manero
D	10	Irene García
A	11	Natalia Prado
D	12	Ainhoa Arnold
A	14	Patricia Vidal
A	15	Eva Lago
A	16	Kathryn Restrepo
D	17	Catalina Burguera
D	19	Berta García
A	20	Maite Recio
A	24	Claudia Lobato
M	25	Mar Camps Sallent
D	30	Selena Hunter
A	37	Teresa Burguera

== Competitive record ==
=== European Lacrosse Championships ===
Year	Position	Pld	W	L
(Czech Republic) 2015	17th	8	0	8
(Israel) 2019	15th	8	4	4
Total		16	4	12

=== Women's Lacrosse World Cup ===
Year	Position	Pld	W	L
(England) 2017	23rd	7	2	5
(United States) 2021	Qualified			
Total		7	2	5

== Games summary ==
Nation	GP	W	L	Pct.	GF	GA	GD
Austria	1	0	1	.000	4	16	–12
Belgium	1	0	1	.000	4	5	–1
China	1	1	0	1.000	16	4	+12
Colombia	1	1	0	1.000	13	5	+8
Czech Republic	1	0	1	.000	0	23	–23
Finland	2	2	0	1.000	21	14	+7
Germany	2	0	2	.000	3	34	–31
Italy	1	0	1	.000	3	11	–8
Japan	1	0	1	.000	1	27	–26
Latvia	3	0	3	.000	12	24	–12
Mexico	1	0	1	.000	7	8	–1
Netherlands	1	0	1	.000	1	16	–15
Norway	1	0	1	.000	5	8	–3
Sweden	4	2	2	.500	23	30	–7
Switzerland	2	0	2	.000	4	15	–11
Total	23	6	17	.261	117	240	–123

== Official matches ==
=== 2015 Women's Lacrosse European Championship ===
6 August 2015 Group D	Spain	3–8	Sweden	Nymburk, Czech Republic
15:00		Boxscore

7 August 2015 Group D	Germany	17–0	Spain	Nymburk, Czech Republic
16:00		Boxscore

9 August 2015 Group D	Switzerland	4–1	Spain	Nymburk, Czech Republic
12:00		Boxscore

10 August 2015 Group D	Spain	2–10	Latvia	Nymburk, Czech Republic
9:00		Boxscore

11 August 2015 13th place group	Spain	1–16	Netherlands	Nymburk, Czech Republic
13:30		Boxscore

12 August 2015 13th place group	Norway	8–5	Spain	Nymburk, Czech Republic
13:30		Boxscore

14 August 2015 13th place group	Sweden	7–2	Spain	Nymburk, Czech Republic
13:30		Boxscore

15 August 2015 13th place group	Spain	4–5	Belgium	Nymburk, Czech Republic
10:30		Boxscore

=== 2017 Women's Lacrosse World Cup ===
13 July 2017 Pool D	Latvia	9–6	Spain	Guildford, England
16:30		Report

15 July 2017 Pool D	Germany	17–3	Spain	Guildford, England
11:00		Report

16 July 2017 Pool D	Spain	1–27	Japan	Guildford, England
14:30		Report

17 July 2017 Pool D	Spain	7–8	Mexico	Guildford, England
11:30		Report

18 July 2017 Diamond Division	Spain	16–4	China	Guildford, England
17:30		Report

19 July 2017 Diamond Division	Latvia	5–4	Spain	Guildford, England
13:30		Report

21 July 2017 23rd place game	Spain	13–5	Colombia	Guildford, England
13:30		Report

=== 2019 Women's European Lacrosse Championship ===
17 July 2019 Group C	Austria	16–4	Spain	Netanya, Israel
15:20		Report

19 July 2019 Group C	Spain	11–10	Finland	Netanya, Israel
17:20		Report

20 July 2019 Group C	Spain	0–23	Czech Republic	Netanya, Israel
15:20		Report

21 July 2019 Group C	Sweden	8–9	Spain	Netanya, Israel
15:00		Report

22 July 2019 Play-in game	Spain	3–11	Switzerland	Netanya, Israel
13:00		Report

23 July 2019 13th position group	Italy	11–3	Spain	Netanya, Israel
10:40		Report

24 July 2019 13th position group	Finland	4–10	Spain	Netanya, Israel
17:40		Report

25 July 2019 13th position group	Sweden	7–9	Spain	Netanya, Israel
12:40		Report

== Top goalscorers ==
Pos.	Player	Goals
3	Selena Hunter	14
2	Teresa Burguera	13
2	Teresa Burguera	13
4	Kathryn Restrepo	12
5	Sarah Quigley	11
6	Patricia Vidal	7
7	Marta Bravo	6
7	Beatriz de la Fuente	6
9	Mar Camps	5
10	Camino González	4

== See also ==
- Spain men's national lacrosse team
- Lacrosse in Spain
