= William Beroza =

American lacrosse player and coach

William Beroza is an American lacrosse goalie, coach and member of the National Lacrosse Hall of Fame.

Beroza played lacrosse at Hempstead High School, and was an All-Division honoree. After graduating high school, he was the goalie for Roanoke College, where he was honored as Honorable Mention All-American in 1976, and Second Team All-American in 1977. In his senior year, he helped lead the team to the NCAA Division II/III semi-finals where he set an NCAA record 30 saves in a playoff game. In 1987, he was inducted into the Roanoke College Athletic Hall of Fame.

During the next 20 years, Beroza played for numerous different post-collegiate club teams, winning many honors and championships, including Player of the Year in 1978 and Championship Game Most Valuable Player in 1980. In 1982, he was named to the USA national team.

Since college and as part of the LILC, Beroza was a three time member of the USA Lacrosse Team (1978-Alternate, 1982-Goalie, 1986-Alternate). As a co-captain of the USA team, Bill was a member of the 1982 World Championship team that defeated Australia in the summer of 1982 in Baltimore, MD. He was also an alternate to the team in 1978 and 1986.

In 1998, Beroza was named an assistant coach to the 1998 World Lacrosse Tournament's USA Team. That team went on to defeat Team Canada, 14-12, in the Championship Game. In 1996, Beroza was inducted into the National Lacrosse Hall of Fame in 1996. Beroza started two professional lacrosse teams and played for both: the NJ Saints (now the NY Saints) and the Detroit Turbos. Beroza was an assistant coach of the Leopards at Wentworth Institute of Technology in Boston Ma for 4 seasons.

William was inducted into the National Jewish Sports Hall of Fame.

Beroza currently serves as the head coach of Israel's men's national lacrosse team. The Israeli team finished in 7th place at the 2014 Lacrosse World Championships in Denver, Colorado. As one of the original board members, Beroza continues to focus on growing lacrosse in Israel at the grassroots level.
