= 2015 Women's Lacrosse European Championship =

The 2015 Women's Lacrosse European Championship was the 10th edition of this tournament. It was held in Nymburk, Czech Republic on August 6–15, 2015.

17 teams will join the tournament. England is the defending champion and five nations (Belgium, Israel, Italy, Norway and Spain) will compete in the event for the first time.

== Competition format ==
Teams have been divided in three groups of four teams and one group of five. The two top teams of each group join the championship bracket while the rest of the teams will play the classification games.

=== Draw ===
The seeding has been determined by given team's placement at the last European Championship and the 2013 Women's Lacrosse World Cup.

Pot 1	Pot 2	Pot 3	Pot 4
England; Germany; Scotland; Wales	Czech Republic; Ireland; Netherlands; Sweden	Austria; Finland; Israel; Latvia	Belgium; Italy; Norway; Spain; Switzerland

== First round ==
=== Group A ===
Pos	Team	Pld	W	D	L	GF	GA	GD	Pts	Qualification
1	England	3	3	0	0	51	3	+48	6	Qualification to championship bracket
2	Czech Republic	3	2	0	1	36	25	+11	4	Qualification to championship bracket
3	Finland	3	1	0	2	19	35	−16	2	Qualification to 9th place group
4	Norway	3	0	0	3	6	49	−43	0	Qualification to 13th place group

Source: Official website

6 August 2015

Boxscore

Czech Republic	3–17	England
Scoring by half: 1–7, 2–10

7 August 2015

Boxscore

Finland	13–4	Norway
Scoring by half: 6–1, 7–3

8 August 2015

Boxscore

England	17–0	Finland
Scoring by half: 14–0, 3–0

8 August 2015

Boxscore

Norway	2–19	Czech Republic
Scoring by half: 2–12, 0–7

9 August 2015

Boxscore

Czech Republic	14–6	Finland
Scoring by half: 7–4, 7–2

9 August 2015

Boxscore

England	17–0	Norway
Scoring by half: 8–0, 9–0

=== Group B ===
Pos	Team	Pld	W	D	L	GF	GA	GD	Pts	Qualification
1	Wales	3	2	1	0	41	13	+28	5	Qualification to championship bracket
2	Israel	3	2	1	0	39	20	+19	5	Qualification to championship bracket
3	Italy	3	1	0	2	25	41	−16	2	Qualification to 9th place group
4	Netherlands	3	0	0	3	16	47	−31	0	Qualification to 13th place group

Source: Official website

6 August 2015

Boxscore

Israel	9–9	Wales
Scoring by half: 8–2, 1–7

7 August 2015

Boxscore

Wales	15–1	Netherlands
Scoring by half: 12–0, 3–1

7 August 2015

Boxscore

Italy	8–12	Israel
Scoring by half: 4–7, 4–5

8 August 2015

Boxscore

Netherlands	12–14	Italy
Scoring by half: 3–8, 9–6

9 August 2015

Boxscore

Israel	18–3	Netherlands
Scoring by half: 14–2, 4–1

9 August 2015

Boxscore

Wales	17–3	Italy
Scoring by half: 5–2, 12–1

=== Group C ===
Pos	Team	Pld	W	D	L	GF	GA	GD	Pts	Qualification
1	Scotland	3	3	0	0	48	7	+41	6	Qualification to championship bracket
2	Ireland	3	2	0	1	41	19	+22	4	Qualification to championship bracket
3	Austria	3	1	0	2	26	36	−10	2	Qualification to 9th place group
4	Belgium	3	0	0	3	4	57	−53	0	Qualification to 13th place group

Source: Official website

6 August 2015

Boxscore

Scotland	20–0	Austria
Scoring by half: 12–0, 8–0

7 August 2015

Boxscore

Ireland (Republic of Ireland)	15–8	Austria
Scoring by half: 11–2, 4–6

7 August 2015

Boxscore

Belgium	0–20	Scotland
Scoring by half: 0–13, 0–7

8 August 2015

Boxscore

Austria	18–1	Belgium
Scoring by half: 14–0, 4–1

8 August 2015

Boxscore

Scotland	8–7	(Republic of Ireland) Ireland
Scoring by half: 5–4, 3–3

9 August 2015

Boxscore

Ireland (Republic of Ireland)	19–3	Belgium
Scoring by half: 14–3, 5–0

=== Group D ===
Pos	Team	Pld	W	D	L	GF	GA	GD	Pts	Qualification
1	Germany	4	4	0	0	68	6	+62	8	Qualification to championship bracket
2	Latvia	4	3	0	1	31	26	+5	6	Qualification to championship bracket
3	Switzerland	4	2	0	2	23	34	−11	4	Qualification to 9th place group
4	Sweden	4	1	0	3	18	41	−23	2	Qualification to 13th place group
5	Spain	4	0	0	4	6	39	−33	0	Qualification to 13th place group

Source: Official website

6 August 2015

Boxscore

Spain	3–8	Sweden
Scoring by half: 0–3, 3–5

6 August 2015

Boxscore

Germany	17–3	Switzerland
Scoring by half: 9–1, 8–2

7 August 2015

Boxscore

Switzerland	8–10	Latvia
Scoring by half: 4–5, 4–5

7 August 2015

Boxscore

Germany	17–0	Spain
Scoring by half: 12–0, 5–0

8 August 2015

Boxscore

Latvia	3–12	Germany
Scoring by half: 2–8, 1–4

8 August 2015

Boxscore

Sweden	6–8	Switzerland
Scoring by half: 3–2, 3–6

9 August 2015

Boxscore

Switzerland	4–1	Spain
Scoring by half: 2–0, 2–1

9 August 2015

Boxscore

Latvia	8–4	Sweden
Scoring by half: 5–2, 3–2

10 August 2015

Boxscore

Spain	2–10	Latvia
Scoring by half: 0–5, 0–5

10 August 2015

Boxscore

Sweden	0–22	Germany
Scoring by half: 0–13, 0–9

== 13th place group ==
Pos	Team	Pld	W	D	L	GF	GA	GD	Pts
13	Netherlands	4	4	0	0	70	13	+57	8
14	Sweden	4	2	1	1	37	26	+11	5
15	Norway	4	2	1	1	33	41	−8	5
16	Belgium	4	1	0	3	17	53	−36	2
17	Spain	4	0	0	4	12	36	−24	0

Source: Official website

11 August 2015

Boxscore

Spain	1–16	Netherlands
Scoring by half: 1–10, 0–6

11 August 2015

Boxscore

Norway	8–8	Sweden
Scoring by half: 3–5, 5–3

12 August 2015

Boxscore

Sweden	17–2	Belgium
Scoring by half: 6–2, 11–0

12 August 2015

Boxscore

Norway	8–5	Spain
Scoring by half: 5–3, 3–2

13 August 2015

Boxscore

Belgium	9–11	Norway
Scoring by half: 5–6, 4–5

13 August 2015

Boxscore

Netherlands	14–5	Sweden
Scoring by half: 7–3, 7–2

14 August 2015

Boxscore

Sweden	7–2	Spain
Scoring by half: 2–2, 5–0

14 August 2015

Boxscore

Belgium	1–21	Netherlands
Scoring by half: 1–13, 0–8

15 August 2015

Boxscore

Spain	4–5	Belgium
Scoring by half: 2–2, 2–3

15 August 2015

Boxscore

Netherlands	19–6	Norway
Scoring by half: 7–3, 12–3

== 9th place group ==
Pos	Team	Pld	W	D	L	GF	GA	GD	Pts
9	Italy	3	3	0	0	28	23	+5	6
10	Austria	3	2	0	1	29	20	+9	4
11	Finland	3	1	0	2	25	21	+4	2
12	Switzerland	3	0	0	3	15	33	−18	0

Source: Official website

11 August 2015

Boxscore

Italy	9–7	Finland
Scoring by half: 2–3, 7–4

11 August 2015

Boxscore

Austria	11–5	Switzerland
Scoring by half: 7–2, 4–3

12 August 2015

Boxscore

Italy	9–8	Austria
Scoring by half: 2–5, 7–3

13 August 2015

Boxscore

Finland	6–10	Austria
Scoring by half: 2–6, 4–4

13 August 2015

Boxscore

Switzerland	8–10	Italy
Scoring by half: 4–6, 4–4

14 August 2015

Boxscore

Finland	12–2	Switzerland
Scoring by half: 4–1, 8–1

== Championship bracket ==
Fifth place
C2	(Republic of Ireland) Ireland	8
D1	Germany	5
Seventh place
D2	Latvia	2
A2	Czech Republic	13

Consolation semifinals
C2	(Republic of Ireland) Ireland	14
D2	Latvia	3
D1	Germany	8
A2	Czech Republic	5

Quarterfinals
A1	England	23
C2	(Republic of Ireland) Ireland	4
D1	Germany	5
B2	Israel	10
B1	Wales	20
D2	Latvia	1
C1	Scotland	15
A2	Czech Republic	6

Semifinals
A1	England	12
B2	Israel	8
B1	Wales	13
C1	Scotland	7

Final
A1	England	11
B1	Wales	8
Third place
B2	Israel	9
C1	Scotland	10

=== Quarterfinals ===
12 August 2015

Boxscore

England	23–4	(Republic of Ireland) Ireland
Scoring by half: 9–4, 14–0

12 August 2015

Boxscore

Wales	20–1	Latvia
Scoring by half: 12–0, 8–1

12 August 2015

Boxscore

Germany	5–10	Israel
Scoring by half: 3–5, 2–5

12 August 2015

Boxscore

Scotland	15–6	Czech Republic
Scoring by half: 9–2, 6–4

=== 5th to 8th place ===
13 August 2015

Boxscore

Ireland (Republic of Ireland)	14–3	Latvia
Scoring by half: 8–2, 6–1

13 August 2015

Boxscore

Germany	8–5	Czech Republic
Scoring by half: 6–2, 3–3

=== 7th place game ===
14 August 2015

Boxscore

Latvia	2–13	Czech Republic
Scoring by half: 1–4, 1–9

=== 5th place game ===
15 August 2015

Boxscore

Ireland (Republic of Ireland)	8–4	Germany
Scoring by half: 4–1, 4–3

=== Semifinals ===
14 August 2015

Boxscore

England	12–8	Israel
Scoring by half: 8–4, 4–4

14 August 2015

Boxscore

Wales	13–7	Scotland
Scoring by half: 6–2, 7–5

=== 3rd place game ===
15 August 2015

Boxscore

Israel	9–10	Scotland
Scoring by half: 8–6, 1–4

=== Final ===
15 August 2015

Boxscore

England	11–8	Wales
Scoring by half: 8–6, 3–2
