= Oi Hockey Stadium =

Multipurpose stadium in Tokyo, Japan

- 大井ホッケー競技場
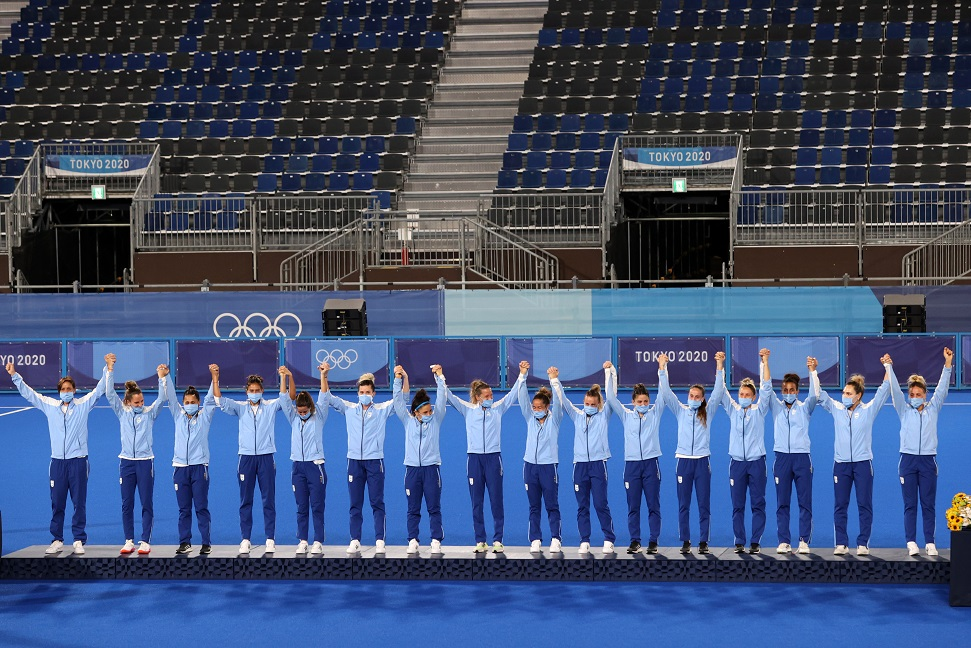
- Argentina women's hockey team (silver) at the medal ceremony, the stands of the Oi Hockey Stadium in the background
- Interactive map of Oi Hockey Stadium
- Address: Tokyo
- Coordinates: 35.592764°N 139.753675°E
- Capacity: 15,000
- Surface: Astroturf

Construction
- Opened: 2019

The Oi Hockey Stadium (Japanese: 大井ホッケー競技場, Ōi hokkē kyōgijō) is a Japanese field hockey stadium built on the occasion of the 2020 Summer Olympics in Tokyo. It was inaugurated on August 17, 2019. The stadium is located in the Ōi Futō Chūō Kaihin Park in the Shinagawa district and has a capacity of 15,000 spectators.

During the construction of the playing field, attention was paid to sustainability. The synthetic turf on the site is Poligras Tokyo GT, a product of the Sport Group that also produces AstroTurf. The mat consists of sixty percent sugar cane, and needs two-thirds less water than is usual for wetting hockey fields.
