= 2016 European Lacrosse Championship =

The 2016 European Lacrosse Championship was the 10th edition of the European Lacrosse competition for national teams. It was played in Budapest, Hungary from 28 July to 6 August 2016.

== Draw ==
The draw was held in Budapest on 10 January 2016.

The four first qualified teams (England, Ireland, Sweden and Netherlands) were placed directly into groups A to D respectively. The other 20 teams were divided into five pots according to its position in the 2012 European Championship.

Pot 1	Pot 2	Pot 3	Pot 4	Pot 5
Germany (5th); Scotland (6th); Finland (7th); Israel (8th)	Czech Republic (9th); Wales (10th); Switzerland (11th); Slovakia (12th)	Italy (13th); Norway (14th); Belgium (15th); France (16th)	Spain (17th); Latvia; Poland; Austria	Russia; Denmark; Slovenia; Hungary

== Preliminary round ==
=== Group A ===
Pos	Team	Pld	W	L	GF	GA	GD	Qualification	(England)	(Germany)	(Latvia)	(Czech Republic)	(Hungary)	(Italy)
1	England	5	5	0	95	19	+76	Quarterfinals	—	16–6	—	17–2	—	22–0
2	Germany	5	4	1	56	29	+27	Quarterfinals	—	—	—	9–7	18–1	15–2
3	Latvia	5	3	2	58	32	+26	Classification 9–16	10–13	3–8	—	—	—	—
4	Czech Republic	5	2	3	47	44	+3	Classification 9–16	—	—	6–12	—	11–5	—
5	Hungary (H)	5	1	4	20	79	−59	Classification 17–24	1–27	—	2–15	—	—	11–8
6	Italy	5	0	5	14	87	−73	Classification 17–24	—	—	3–18	1–21	—	—

Source: Lacrosse2016
(H) Hosts

=== Group B ===
Pos	Team	Pld	W	L	GF	GA	GD	Qualification	(Wales)	(Scotland)	(Norway)	(Republic of Ireland)	(Austria)	(Denmark)
1	Wales	5	4	1	58	24	+34	Quarterfinals	—	—	6–5	3–5	—	—
2	Scotland	5	4	1	61	35	+26	Quarterfinals	8–12	—	12–10	10–8	—	—
3	Norway	5	3	2	63	33	+30	Classification 9–16	—	—	—	10–8	14–5	24–2
4	Ireland	5	3	2	54	28	+26	Classification 9–16	—	—	—	—	16–0	17–5
5	Austria	5	1	4	24	69	−45	Classification 17–24	3–16	1–16	—	—	—	15–7
6	Denmark	5	0	5	21	92	−71	Classification 17–24	3–21	4–15	—	—	—	—

Source: Lacrosse2016

=== Group C ===
Pos	Team	Pld	W	L	GF	GA	GD	Qualification	(Israel)	(Switzerland)	(Sweden)	(Belgium)	(Slovenia)	(Spain)
1	Israel	5	5	0	71	13	+58	Quarterfinals	—	—	—	—	12–0	17–1
2	Switzerland	5	4	1	60	22	+38	Quarterfinals	2–9	—	—	—	23–1	12–4
3	Sweden	5	3	2	53	37	+16	Classification 9–16	6–16	3–8	—	14–4	—	—
4	Belgium	5	2	3	38	62	−24	Classification 9–16	4–17	5–15	—	—	—	—
5	Slovenia	5	1	4	9	80	−71	Classification 17–24	—	—	1–18	5–13	—	2–14
6	Spain	5	0	5	38	55	−17	Classification 17–24	—	—	8–12	11–12	—	—

Source: Lacrosse2016

=== Group D ===
Pos	Team	Pld	W	L	GF	GA	GD	Qualification	(Finland)	(Netherlands)	(Poland)	(Russia)	(Slovakia)	(France)
1	Finland	5	5	0	80	10	+70	Quarterfinals	—	—	—	21–1	19–2	—
2	Netherlands	5	4	1	61	25	+36	Quarterfinals	2–11	—	—	—	19–7	21–1
3	Poland	5	3	2	32	29	+3	Classification 9–16	2–11	2–4	—	—	—	10–3
4	Russia	5	2	3	33	52	−19	Classification 9–16	—	4–15	7–8	—	—	12–4
5	Slovakia	5	1	4	28	59	−31	Classification 17–24	—	—	4–10	4–9	—	—
6	France	5	0	5	13	72	−59	Classification 17–24	3–18	—	—	—	2–11	—

Source: Lacrosse2016

== 17th to 24th position bracket ==
21st place match
D5	Slovakia	7
A6	Italy	9
23rd place match
C6	Slovenia	5
D6	France	9

21st – 24th place play-offs
C6	Slovenia	3
D5	Slovakia	12
A6	Italy (OT)	13
D6	France	12

17th – 24th place play-offs
A5	Hungary	12
C6	Slovenia	4
D5	Slovakia	12
B6	Denmark	13
C5	Spain	14
A6	Italy	7
B5	Austria	10
D6	France	3

17th – 20th place play-offs
A5	Hungary	9
B6	Denmark	7
C5	Spain	10
B5	Austria	8

17th place match
A5	Hungary	13
C5	Spain	6
19th place match
B6	Denmark	3
B5	Austria	13

== 9th to 16th position bracket ==
13th place match
D3	Poland	10
C3	Sweden	12
15th place match
C4	Belgium	11
D4	Russia	7

13th – 16th place play-offs
C4	Belgium	8
D3	Poland	10
C3	Sweden	14
D4	Russia	7

9th – 16th place play-offs
A3	Latvia	27
C4	Belgium	3
D3	Poland	5
B4	Ireland	15
C3	Sweden	6
A4	Czech Republic	8
B3	Norway	14
D4	Russia	1

9th – 12th place play-offs
A3	Latvia	17
B4	Ireland	12
A4	Czech Republic	9
B3	Norway	6

9th place match
A3	Latvia	12
A4	Czech Republic	10
11th place match
B4	Ireland	10
B3	Norway	7

== Tournament bracket ==
Fifth place
C2	Switzerland	5
A2	Germany	10
Seventh place
B2	Scotland	8
D2	Netherlands	11

Consolation semifinals
C2	Switzerland	9
B2	Scotland	8
A2	Germany	9
D2	Netherlands	5

Quarterfinals
A1	England	12
C2	Switzerland	3
D1	Finland (OT)	9
B2	Scotland	8
C1	Israel	8
A2	Germany	4
B1	Wales	12
D2	Netherlands	5

Semifinals
A1	England	14
D1	Finland	1
C1	Israel	10
B1	Wales	3

Final
A1	England	7
C1	Israel	6
Third place
D1	Finland	12
B1	Wales	4

== Final standings ==
Pos.	Team	W–L
1st place, gold medalist(s)	England	8–0
2nd place, silver medalist(s)	Israel	7–1
3rd place, bronze medalist(s)	Finland	7–1
4	Wales	5–3
5	Germany	6–2
6	Switzerland	5–3
7	Netherlands	5–3
8	Scotland	4–4
9	Latvia	6–2
10	Czech Republic	4–4
11	Ireland	5–3
12	Norway	4–4
13	Sweden	5–3
14	Poland	4–4
15	Belgium	3–5
16	Russia	2–6
17	Hungary	4–4
18	Spain	3–5
19	Austria	4–4
20	Denmark	1–7
21	Italy	3–5
22	Slovakia	2–6
23	France	1–7
24	Slovenia	1–7
