= World Lacrosse =

International governing body for lacrosse

- Sport: Lacrosse
- Jurisdiction: International
- Membership: 94 (2025)
- Founded: 30 September 2008; 18 years ago
- Affiliation: ARISF, IWGA, GAISF
- Headquarters: Colorado Springs, Colorado, United States
- President: Sue Redfern
- CEO: Jim Scherr
- Vice president: Steve Stenersen
- (founded): IFWLA (1972); ILF (1974)

Official website
- worldlacrosse.sport

World Lacrosse (WL), formerly the Federation of International Lacrosse, is the international governing body of lacrosse, responsible for the men's, women's, and indoor versions of the sport. It was established on 30 September 2008 by the merger of the previously separate men's and women's international lacrosse associations. Its headquarters are in Colorado Springs, Colorado, United States.

World Lacrosse has 92 members. It is the only international sport organization to recognize First Nations bands and Native American tribes as sovereign nations. The Haudenosaunee Nationals of the First Nations Lacrosse Association represent the Haudenosaunee people of New York and Ontario.

World Lacrosse was given provisional recognition status by the International Olympic Committee in November 2018. In May 2019, the Federation of International Lacrosse launched a rebrand and changed its name to World Lacrosse.

In March 2022, due to the 2022 Russian invasion of Ukraine, Russian teams, athletes, and officials were suspended from participation in World Lacrosse events and qualifiers, and it was decided that no World Lacrosse or European Lacrosse Federation events would be held in Russia.

== Tournaments ==
=== World Lacrosse ===
World Lacrosse organizes the following tournaments:

- World Lacrosse Men's Championship (Founded in 1967)
- World Lacrosse Women's Championship (Founded in 1982)
- World Lacrosse Men's U20 Championship (Founded in 1988)
- World Lacrosse Women's U20 Championship (Founded in 1995)
- World Lacrosse Box Men's Championships (Founded in 2003)
- World Lacrosse Box Women's Championships (Founded in 2024)
- World Lacrosse Men's Sixes Championship (Starting in 2026)
- World Lacrosse Women's Sixes Championship (Starting in 2026)

=== Games ===
- Lacrosse at the Summer Olympics
- Lacrosse at the World Games

=== Regional ===
- European Lacrosse Championships
- Asia Pacific Lacrosse Championship
- European Box Lacrosse Championships

== Medals ==
As of 1 August 2025 (After 49 Events)

=== Events ===
1. World Lacrosse Men's Championship (1967–2023) - 14 Editions
2. World Lacrosse Women's Championship (1982–2022) - 11 Editions
3. World Lacrosse Men's U20 Championship (1988–2022) - 9 Editions
4. World Lacrosse Women's U20 Championship (1995–2024) - 8 Editions
5. World Lacrosse Box Men's Championships (2003–2024) - 6 Editions
6. World Lacrosse Box Women's Championships (2024–2024) - 1 Editions

=== Ranking ===
Rank	Nation	Gold	Silver	Bronze	Total
1	United States (USA)	36	8	5	49
2	Canada (CAN)	10	20	11	41
3	Australia (AUS)	3	14	13	30
4	Haudenosaunee (HAU)	0	5	9	14
5	England (ENG)	0	2	9	11
6	Japan (JPN)	0	0	1	1
6	Scotland (SCO)	0	0	1	1
Totals (7 entries)		49	49	49	147

== World Ranking ==
Rankings are based on results from the most recent world championships (1 August 2025):

Men’s Field - 30 Nations

Women’s Field - 30 Nations

U20 Men’s Field - 23 Nations

U20 Women’s Field - 20 Nations

Men’s Box - 28 Nations

Women’s Box - 10 Nations

Men’s Sixes - 8 Nations

Women’s Sixes - 8 Nations

== Members ==
As of March 2024, there are 92 member countries in World Lacrosse, 48 full members and 44 associate members. Membership is split between four continental federations who are affiliated with World Lacrosse and help to develop lacrosse across the world. Associate members are in italics.

1. Africa Association of Lacrosse (AAL) - 2022
2. Asia Pacific Lacrosse Union (APLU) - 2004
3. European Lacrosse Federation (ELF) - 1995
4. Pan-American Lacrosse Association (PALA) - 2018

=== Africa Association of Lacrosse (15) ===
The Africa Association of Lacrosse (AAL) has 2 full members and 13 associate members.

- Benin (2023)
- Botswana (2023)
- Burkina Faso (2023)
- (Ivory Coast) Cote d'Ivoire (2023)
- Ghana (2019)
- Kenya (2016)
- Mozambique (2023)
- Nigeria (2022)
- Rwanda (2022)
- Sierra Leone (2023)
- South Africa (2021)
- Togo (2023)
- Uganda (2011)
- Zambia (2023)
- Zimbabwe (2023)

=== Asia Pacific Lacrosse Union (22) ===
The Asia Pacific Lacrosse Union (APLU) has 9 full members and 13 associate members.

- Australia (1974)
- Bangladesh (2025)
- Cambodia (2022)
- China (2012)
- Hong Kong (2002)
- India (2021)
- Indonesia (2021)
- Iran (2022)
- Japan (1990)
- Malaysia (2021)
- New Zealand (2002)
- Pakistan (2024)
- Philippines (2014)
- Qatar (2017)
- Saudi Arabia (2021)
- Singapore (2013)
- South Korea (1995)
- Chinese Taipei (2014)
- Thailand (2010)
- Uzbekistan (2023)
- Vietnam (2021)

=== European Lacrosse Federation (34) ===
The European Lacrosse Federation (ELF) has 26 full members and 8 associate members.

- Austria (2005)
- Belgium (2009)
- Bulgaria (2008)
- Croatia (2016)
- Czech Republic (1992)
- Denmark (2003)
- England (1974)
- Estonia (2013)
- Finland (2004)
- France (2008)
- Germany (1994)
- Greece (2017)
- Hungary (2011)
- (Republic of Ireland) Ireland (2002)
- Israel (2005)
- Italy (2003)
- Latvia (2004)
- Lithuania (2019)
- Luxembourg (2017)
- Malta (2023)
- Netherlands (2004)
- Norway (2008)
- Poland (2008)
- Portugal (2008)
- Russia (2011)
- Scotland (1995)
- Serbia (2010)
- Slovakia (2004)
- Slovenia (2005)
- Spain (2004)
- Sweden (1994)
- Switzerland (2008)
- (Turkey) Türkiye (2010)
- Ukraine (2018)
- Wales (1995)

=== Pan-American Lacrosse Association (22) ===
The Pan-American Lacrosse Association (PALA) has 11 full members and 11 associate members.

- Argentina (2002)
- Barbados (2019)
- Bermuda (2006)
- Brazil (2023)
- Canada (1974)
- Chile (2017)
- Colombia (2013)
- Costa Rica (2008)
- Dominican Republic (2020)
- Ecuador (2018)
- Guatemala (2010)
- Haiti (2016)
- Haudenosaunee (1985)
- Jamaica (2013)
- Mexico (2009)
- Nicaragua (2022)
- Panama (2020)
- Peru (2012)
- Puerto Rico (2016)
- United States (1974)
- Uruguay (2022)
- (United States Virgin Islands) U.S. Virgin Islands (2020)

== Awards ==
Lifetime Achievement Award
Name	Country	Year
Laurie Turnbull	Australia	1974
Jack Wilkinson	England	1978
Buzzy Budnitz	USA	1982
Marshall Spence	Canada	1986
Margaret Boyd	England	1989
Jane Vache	USA	1989
Clive Carr	Australia	1990
Elizabeth Blaydes	England	1993
Jackie Pitts	USA	1993
Stan Smith	England	1994
Lanetta Ware	USA	2001
Tom Hayes	USA	2002
Peter Hobbs	Australia	2008
Feffie Barnhill	USA	2009
Fiona Clark	Australia	2009
Susie Ganzenmuller	USA	2009
Marge Garinger	USA	2009
Sue Redfern	England	2009
Stan Cockerton	Canada	2017
Shelley Maher	Australia	2017
Ron Balls	England	2020
Steve Stenersen	USA	2023
Lorna Powell	Scotland	2024

== Predecessor organizations ==
=== International Lacrosse Federation ===
The International Lacrosse Federation (ILF) was founded in 1974 to promote and develop men's lacrosse throughout the world. Before 2008, the international governing bodies for men's and women's lacrosse were separate, which was one of the obstacles of lacrosse one day becoming an Olympic sport. In August 2008 in Lahti, Finland, the ILF and the International Federation of Women's Lacrosse Associations merged to become the Federation of International Lacrosse (FIL), that was formally established on 30 September 2008.

ILF Founders: Thomas Hayes (USA) Don Hobbs (Australia) Laurie Turnbull (Australia) Nigel Wade (England)

The ILF conducted the World Lacrosse Championship, World Indoor Lacrosse Championship and the men's Under-19 World Lacrosse Championships, all of which were taken over by the FIL.

=== IFWLA ===
The International Federation of Women's Lacrosse Associations (IFWLA) was formed in 1972 to promote and develop women's lacrosse throughout the world. It wound up its affairs in 2008 when it agreed to merge with the ILF to form the Federation of International Lacrosse.

Promoting all levels of lacrosse included IFWLA sponsorship of the Women's Lacrosse World Cup and the Women's Under-19 World Lacrosse Championships, tournaments taken over by the FIL.

== See also ==
- List of national lacrosse governing bodies
- Lacrosse at the Summer Olympics
