= Under-19 World Lacrosse Championships =

The World Lacrosse Men's U20 Championship and World Lacrosse Women's U20 Championship, formerly Under-19 World Lacrosse Championships (U-19), are held separately for men and women every four years to award world championships for the under-19 age group in men's lacrosse and women's lacrosse. The tournaments are sanctioned by World Lacrosse.

These championships were first held for men in 1988 and for women in 1995. They have only been held in the same year twice and both times in the same country; 1999 in Australia and 2003 in the United States. The United States has won every men's U-19 tournament and all but two women's U-19 tourneys.

The 2008 men's championship was held in July 2008 in Coquitlam, British Columbia, Canada and was won by the United States. The 2012 men's tournament was held in Turku, Finland, with the United States winning the title, defeating Canada 10–8, despite a pair of pool-play losses to Canada and the Iroquois Nationals. The Iroquois Nationals finished third after an 18–1 win over England. The 2016 championship for men was held July 7–16, 2016, again in Coquitlam, British Columbia, just outside Vancouver. The U.S. won its eighth title, coming back from being down 6–0 to eventually defeat Canada 13–12.

The most recent championship for women was held in Edinburgh, Scotland in 2015. The Haudenosaunee Nationals women's lacrosse team could not participate due to British passport requirements. Canada won its first gold medal, defeating the United States 9–8 in the final.

At the 2022 event in Limerick, Ireland, a record number of 23 teams participated.

The next editions of the tournament will be under-20 competitions. The women's U-20 Championship will be held in Hong Kong in 2024 and the men's U-20 Championship will be held in 2025.

== Men's U-19/20/21 World Championship ==
Year	Champion	Runner-up	Host
1988	United States	Canada	Adelaide, Australia
1992	United States	Australia	Long Island, United States
1996	United States	Australia	Tokyo, Japan
1999	United States	Canada	Adelaide, Australia
2003	United States	Canada	Baltimore, United States
2008	United States	Canada	Coquitlam, Canada
2012	United States	Canada	Turku, Finland
2016	United States	Canada	Coquitlam, Canada
2022 (Note: Due to the event being postponed for two years, the age limit for this edition was raised to U-21.)	United States	Canada	Limerick, Ireland
2025	Canada	United States	Seoguipo, South Korea

== Women's U-19/20 World Championship ==
Year	Champion	Runner-up	Host
1995	Australia	United States	Haverford, United States
1999	United States	Australia	Perth, Australia
2003	United States	Australia	Baltimore, United States
2007	United States	Australia	Peterborough, Canada
2011	United States	Australia	Hanover, Germany
2015	Canada	United States	Edinburgh, Scotland
2019	United States	Canada	Peterborough, Canada
2024	United States	Canada	Hong Kong, China

== See also ==
- Women's Lacrosse World Cup
- World Lacrosse Championship
