= Jamaica Lacrosse Association =

Sports governing body in Jamaica

- Sport: Lacrosse
- Jurisdiction: National
- Founded: 2013
- Affiliation: World Lacrosse
- Affiliation date: 2013
- Regional affiliation: PALA (Americas)

Official website
- jamaicalacrosse.net
- (Jamaica)

The Jamaica Lacrosse Association (JLA) is the governing body for lacrosse in the Jamaica.

== History ==
The Jamaica Lacrosse Association (JLA) was established in April 2013 by Dwight Clarke and Calbert Hutchinson. The pair was selected by a development officer from a world sporting body for their the international volunteer groups and education to help introduce lacrosse in Jamaica.

The organization launched a lacrosse program for high school students within the same year. In October 2013, the JLA became a member of the then-Federation of International Lacrosse (later renamed as World Lacrosse). At the 2017 Taino Cup, there are six boys and four girls teams.

The JLA had its men's national field lacrosse team make their World Lacrosse Men's Championship in the 2018 edition in Netanya, Israel. The team finished 13th place. The women's team qualified for their first World Women's Championship, the 2022 edition in Towson, Maryland via the November 2019 Pan American Lacrosse Association Qualifier

In 2023, the JLA with the backing of the Jamaica Olympic Association (JOA) hosted the Pan-American Lacrosse Association (PALA) Sixes Cup, a lacrosse sixes competition.

Jamaica hosted the first-ever Pan-American Men's Lacrosse Championship in Kingston in August 2026.

In August 2026, Jamaica qualified for the 2027 World Lacrosse Championships in Tokyo, Japan.
