= CJ Kirst =

American lacrosse player

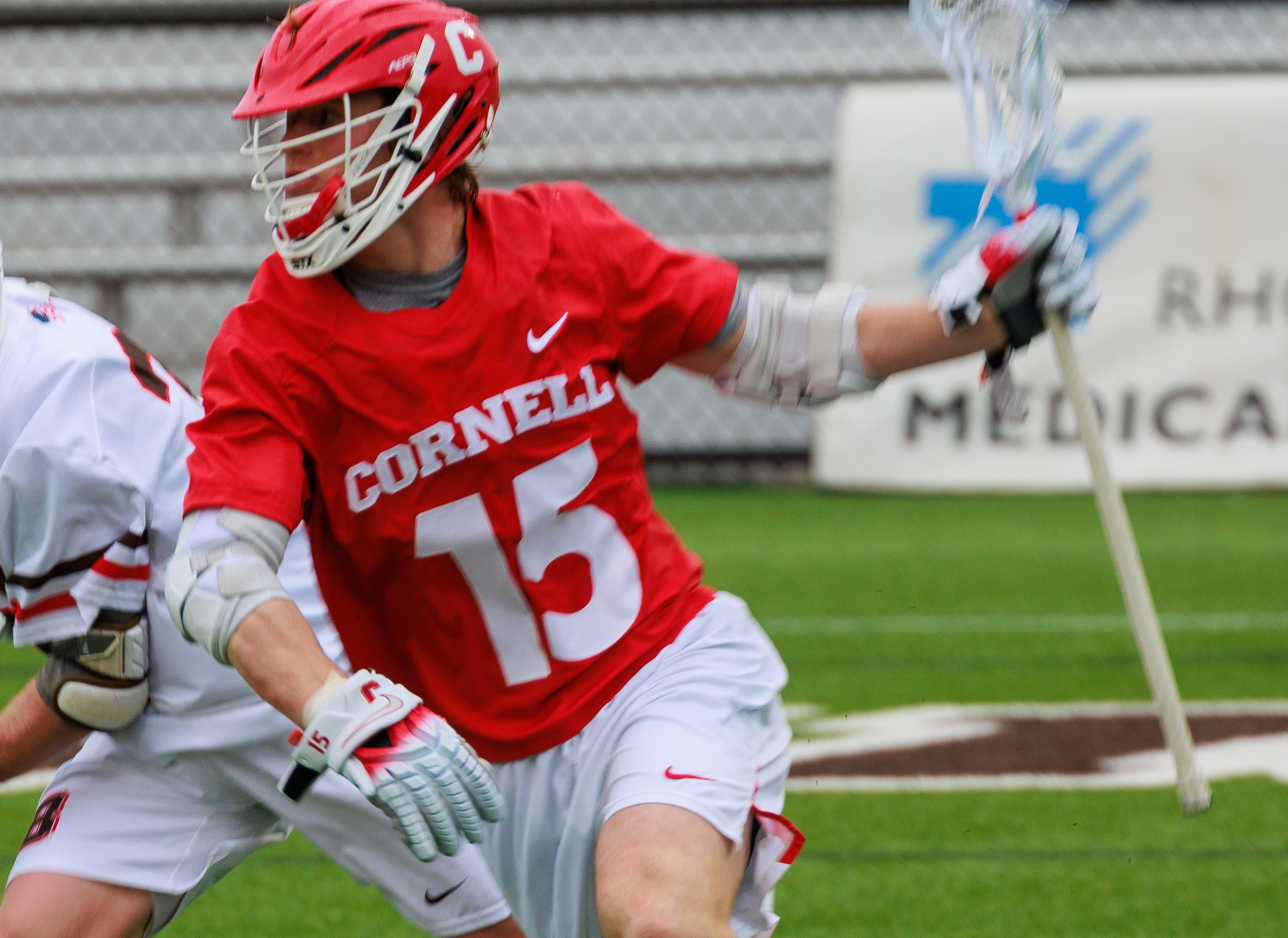
- Kirst with the Cornell Big Red in 2025

Personal information
- Born: September 20, 2002 (age 24) Bernardsville, New Jersey, U.S.
- Height: 6 ft 2 in (188 cm)
- Weight: 210 lb (95 kg; 15 st 0 lb)

Sport
- Position: Attack
- Shoots: Left
- NCAA team: Cornell (2025)
- NLL draft: 1st overall, 2025; Toronto Rock
- NLL team: Toronto Rock
- PLL team: Philadelphia Waterdogs
- Pro career: 2025–

Career highlights
- NCAA: Tewaaraton Trophy (2025); Lt. Raymond Enners Award (2025); Jack Turnbull Award (2023); 2x Ivy League Player of the Year (2023, 2025); 2x ECAC Offensive Player of the Year (2023, 2025); 3x USILA All-American; Division I Champion (2025); Most Division I goals (247); Most Division I single season goals (82; tie); Division I top scorer (2023, 2025); NLL: 1x Champion (2026); Rookie of the Year (2026); PLL: 1x PLL Champion (2026); 1x PLL Championship MVP (2026); Jim Brown Most Valuable Player (2026); First Team All-Pro (2026); All-Star (2026); Most single season goals (42)
Medal record
Representing United States
Men's field lacrosse
World Lacrosse Men's U20 Championship
Winner	2022 Limerick
Men's box lacrosse
World Lacrosse Box Championships
Runner-up	2024 Utica

Christopher John Kirst (born September 20, 2002) is an American professional lacrosse player for the Philadelphia Waterdogs of the Premier Lacrosse League (PLL) and for the Toronto Rock of the National Lacrosse League (NLL), having become the fifth player to be selected first overall in both drafts in 2025. Previously, Kirst played college lacrosse for Cornell University, where he set a new Division I record for most career goals with 247. In his senior year, he tied Jon Reese's and Miles Thompson's single season goals record with 82, helped win Cornell's first NCAA title in any sport in 48 years, and became the third Cornell player to win the Tewaaraton Trophy after Max Seibald and Rob Pannell.

== Early life ==
CJ Kirst was born the fourth of five sons to Kyle and Michelle Kirst in 2002. He grew up in Bernardsville, New Jersey with his four brothers, who would all go on to play collegiate lacrosse and the three eldest of whom, Connor, Colin, and Cole, currently play in the PLL. The boys' father, who had earned a name for himself coaching lacrosse at various high schools in New Jersey and played goalie for Rutgers earlier in his career, died suddenly from a heart attack in 2015.

CJ attended the Delbarton School in Morristown, where he was one of the state's leading scorers before his senior year was cut short by the COVID-19 pandemic in 2020. He committed to Cornell for lacrosse in July 2019. He also played basketball during his four years at Delbarton, but did not continue the sport in college.

== College ==
=== Freshman year (2022) ===
Kirst played his first season for Cornell in 2022. He scored 55 goals and a total of 79 points across 19 games for the Big Red his freshman year, second on his team in both metrics. He was named the Ivy League Rookie of the Year at the end of the regular season and was a second-team All-Ivy pick. In the NCAA tournament, where Cornell advanced all the way to the championship game before losing to Maryland, he tied the single-game record of seven goals in a first round victory over Ohio State.

Kirst joined Team USA in July 2022 and played in the World Lacrosse Men's U-21 World Championship in August. He scored five goals against Canada in the final, leading the team to a 12–10 victory, and was named MVP of the tournament.

=== Sophomore year (2023) ===
In 2023, Kirst scored 65 goals, tying Mike French for second-most single season goals by a Cornell player. He scored a total of 84 points across 15 games, including multiple points in all but one game. Against Hobart, Kirst scored 11 points, the most by any Ivy League player in any game that season. For his efforts, Kirst was named a first-team USILA All-American for the first time, as well as first-team all-Ivy. He was named Ivy League Player of the Year, ECAC Offensive Player of the Year, and awarded the Lt. Jack Turnbull Award for Outstanding Attackman. He was also named one of five finalists for the Tewaaraton Award.

=== Junior year (2024) ===
In his junior year, Kirst scored 45 goals and a total of 67 points across 14 games, again scoring multiple points in all but one game. His 3.21 goals per game were the highest in the Ivy League and third-highest nationally that season. Kirst was named a preseason first-team USILA All-American and first-team All-Ivy. For the second time, he advanced to the semifinalist stage of the Tewaaraton Award.

Kirst also represented Team USA in the Men's Box World Championships in September 2024, where the team won their first-ever silver.

=== Senior year (2025) ===
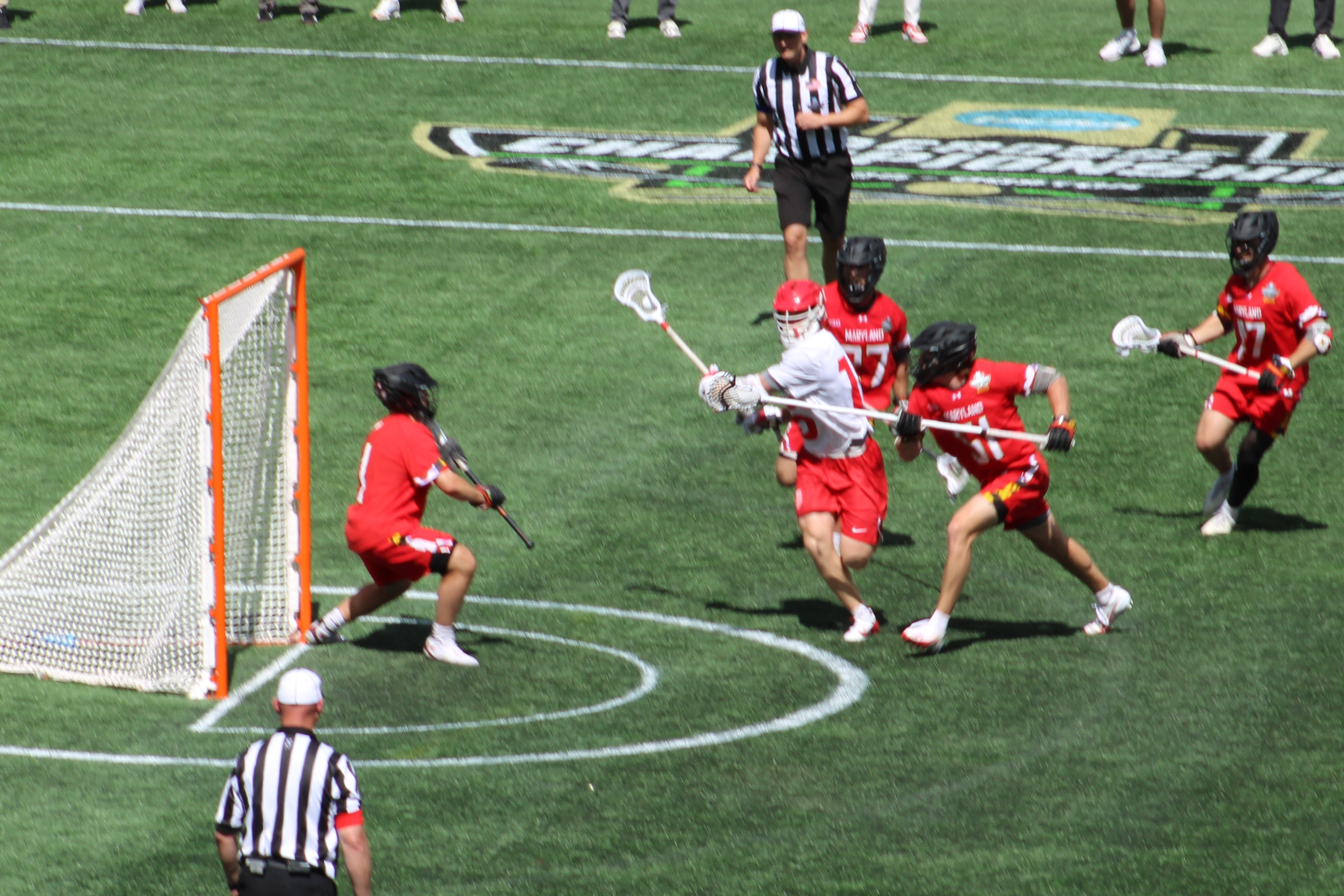
Kirst takes a shot against Maryland in the 2025 NCAA championship game. Maryland goalkeeper Logan McNaney saved this shot, but Cornell went on to win the game 13–10.

Kirst's senior year was perhaps his most impressive. He tallied 82 goals, tying Jon Reese (1990) and Miles Thompson (2014) for most single season goals in Division I history, and a total of 115 points across 19 games. On April 26, in a 10–8 victory against Dartmouth, Kirst scored his 225th goal of his career, breaking the Division I record for career goals. He finished his career with 247 goals and 345 points. He also tallied 64 career caused turnovers, fourth all-time for a Cornell player. Cornell qualified for the NCAA tournament for the first time since 2023, advancing all the way to the championship game as the number one seed. Kirst scored six goals in the championship game against Maryland, a rematch of the 2022 championship game which Kirst had played in as a freshman, leading Cornell to a 13–10 victory and their first NCAA title in any sport in 48 years. Kirst's effort, tying Paul Rabil for most goals scored in a national title game, earned him the tournament's distinction of Most Outstanding Player.

Kirst was named a first-team USILA All-American and first-team All-Ivy for a third time, Ivy League Player of the Year and ECAC Offensive Player of the Year for a second time, and the Lt. Raymond J. Enners Outstanding Player of the Year. On May 29, he became the third Cornell man to win the Tewaaraton Award, joining Max Seibald (2009) and Rob Pannell (2013). On June 26, he was nominated for the 2025 Best Male College Athlete ESPY Award, but was ultimately not selected.

== Professional career ==
Kirst was selected first overall in the Premier Lacrosse League draft by the Philadelphia Waterdogs in May 2025. After receiving surgery for a right hand injury in early June and spending the first six weeks of the 2025 season on the PUP list, Kirst made his debut with the Waterdogs on July 19 against the Maryland Whipsnakes and scored his first professional goal one week later against the Carolina Chaos. During the 2026 season, his second with the Waterdogs, Kirst scored a league record 34 goals during the regular season and was awarded the distinction of PLL MVP on September 18. Two days later, on his 24th birthday, Kirst scored five goals in the Waterdogs' 14–4 victory over the Denver Outlaws in the PLL Championship and was named MVP of the championship game as well. He is currently contracted through 2027.

In September 2025, Kirst was selected first overall in the National Lacrosse League draft by the Toronto Rock, becoming only the fifth player to be selected first overall in both the PLL and NLL drafts. After scoring 71 points on 34 goals and 37 assists in the 2025–26 regular season and an additional 10 points in the playoffs while leading the Rock to the NLL Finals, Kirst was named NLL Rookie of the Year on May 13, 2026. Kirst scored six more points on four goals and two assists in Game 1 of the NLL Finals and an additional goal and assist in Game 2, helping the Rock sweep the Halifax Thunderbirds and win its first NLL Championship in 15 years.

== Statistics ==
=== NCAA ===
Season	Team	GP	GS	G	A	Pts	GB	CT
2022	Cornell	19	19	55	24	79	47	14
2023	Cornell	15	15	65	19	84	37	15
2024	Cornell	14	14	45	22	67	35	16
2025	Cornell	19	19	82	33	115	43	19
Career		67	67	247	98	345	162	64

=== NLL ===
CJ Kirst		Regular season									Playoffs								
Season	Team	GP	G	A	Pts	LB	PIM	Pts/GP	LB/GP	PIM/GP	GP	G	A	Pts	LB	PIM	Pts/GP	LB/GP	PIM/GP
2026	Toronto Rock	18	34	37	71	95	4	3.94	5.28	0.22	6	11	7	18	20	0	3.00	3.33	0.00
		18	34	37	71	95	4	3.94	5.28	0.22	6	11	7	18	20	0	3.00	3.33	0.00
Career Total:		24	45	44	89	115	4	3.71	4.79	0.17									

GP–Games played; G–Goals; A–Assists; Pts–Points; LB–Loose balls; PIM–Penalty minutes; Pts/GP–Points per games played; LB/GP–Loose balls per games played; PIM/GP–Penalty minutes per games played.

=== PLL ===
Season	Team	Regular season											Playoffs										
Season	Team	GP	G	2PG	A	Pts	Sh	GB	Pen	PIM	FOW	FOA	GP	G	2PG	A	Pts	Sh	GB	Pen	PIM	FOW	FOA
2025	Philadelphia Waterdogs	4	9	0	4	13	27	4	0	0	0	0	2	6	0	2	8	20	8	0	0	0	0
2026	Philadelphia Waterdogs	10	34	0	5	39	84	16	0	0	0	0	2	8	0	4	12	18	5	0	0	0	0
		14	43	0	9	52	111	20	0	0	0	0	4	14	0	6	20	38	13	0	0	0	0
Career total:		18	57	0	15	72	149	33	0	0	0	0											

GP–Games played; G–Goals; 2PG–2-point goals; A–Assists; Pts–Points; Sh–Shots; GB–Ground balls; Pen–Penalties; PIM–Penalty minutes; FOW–Faceoffs won; FOA–Faceoffs attempted

== See also ==
- 2025 NCAA Division I men's lacrosse tournament
- Cornell Big Red men's lacrosse
