= 2026 Pan-American Men's Lacrosse Championship =

International lacrosse competition

2026 Pan-American Men’s Lacrosse Championship

Tournament details
- Host country: Jamaica
- Venues: 2 (in 1 host city)
- Dates: August 17–23
- Teams: 9

Final positions
- Champions: Canada (1st title)
- Runners-up: United States
- Third place: Haudenosaunee
- Fourth place: Jamaica

The 2026 Pan-American Men’s Lacrosse Championship was an international men's lacrosse competition held in Kingston, Jamaica from August 17 to 23, 2026. It was hosted by the Jamaica Lacrosse Association with support of the Jamaica Olympic Association.

It was the inaugural edition of the Pan-American Men’s Lacrosse Championship, which is sanctioned under the Pan-American Lacrosse Association (PALA) and determined the five teams which qualified for the 2027 World Lacrosse Men's Championship in Tokyo, Japan. The rest of the teams are eligible to play in Division II.

Canada won the inaugural title, defeating the United States 9–8 in the final.

== Venue ==
Kingston	2026 Pan-American Men's Lacrosse Championship (Jamaica)
Mico University College	2026 Pan-American Men's Lacrosse Championship (Jamaica)
Stadium East	2026 Pan-American Men's Lacrosse Championship (Jamaica)

== Preliminary round ==
=== Pool A ===
Pos	Team	Pld	W	L	GF	GA	GD	Qualification
1	United States	3	3	0	68	9	+59	Advance to Final
2	Jamaica (H)	3	2	1	37	24	+13	Advance to Third place game
3	Puerto Rico	3	1	2	28	39	−11	Advance to Fifth place game
4	Colombia	3	0	3	7	68	−61	Advance to Seventh place game

Source: World Lacrosse
(H) Hosts

August 17, 2026; 17:00	Jamaica	22–2 (4–2, 4–0, 8–0, 6–0)	Colombia	Kingston

Game reference

August 18, 2026; 15:30	United States	23–5 (5–1, 5–0, 4–4, 9–0)	Puerto Rico	Kingston

Game reference

August 19, 2026; 18:00	United States	16–2 (4–0, 4–0, 2–1, 6–1)	Jamaica	Kingston

Game reference

August 20, 2026; 15:30	Puerto Rico	17–3 (5–0, 4–1, 4–1, 4–1)	Colombia	Kingston

Game reference

August 21, 2026; 15:30	Colombia	2–29 (1–10, 1–5, 0–9, 0–5)	United States	Kingston

Game reference

August 21, 2026; 18:00	Jamaica	13–6 (3–1, 5–1, 3–0, 2–4)	Puerto Rico	Kingston

Game reference

=== Pool B ===
Pos	Team	Pld	W	L	GF	GA	GD	Qualification
1	Canada	4	4	0	82	8	+74	Advance to Final
2	Haudenosaunee	4	3	1	71	26	+45	Advance to Third place game
3	Mexico	4	2	2	42	44	−2	Advance to Fifth place game
4	U.S. Virgin Islands	4	1	3	25	69	−44	Advance to Seventh place game
5	Argentina	4	0	4	8	81	−73	

Source: World Lacrosse

August 17, 2026; 11:30	Haudenosaunee	28–1 (7–0, 9–1, 7–0, 5–0)	Argentina	Kingston

Game reference

August 17, 2026; 14:00	Canada	19–2 (7–0, 5–2, 5–0, 2–0)	Mexico	Kingston

Game reference

August 18, 2026; 13:00	Mexico	19–7 (3–2, 5–3, 5–2, 6–0)	U.S. Virgin Islands	Kingston

Game reference

August 19, 2026; 18:00	Canada	17–5 (5–2, 6–0, 3–1, 3–2)	Haudenosaunee	Kingston

Game reference

August 19, 2026; 13:00	Argentina	5–15 (1–2, 0–3, 3–3, 1–7)	U.S. Virgin Islands	Kingston

Game reference

August 19, 2026; 19:00	Haudenosaunee	16–6 (4–1, 3–2, 4–2, 5–1)	Mexico	Kingston

Game reference

August 20, 2026; 13:00	U.S. Virgin Islands	1–23 (0–5, 0–9, 0–8, 1–1)	Canada	Kingston

Game reference

August 20, 2026; 17:00	Mexico	15–2 (4–0, 7–1, 4–1, 0–0)	Argentina	Kingston

Game reference

August 21, 2026; 10:30	U.S. Virgin Islands	2–22 (2–8, 0–7, 0–6, 0–1)	Haudenosaunee	Kingston

Game reference

August 21, 2026; 13:00	Argentina	0–23 (0–9, 0–6, 0–3, 0–5)	Canada	Kingston

Game reference

== Final round ==
=== 7th place game ===
August 22, 2026; 14:00	U.S. Virgin Islands	11–12 (1–2, 5–4, 4–2, 1–4)	Colombia	Kingston

Game reference

=== 5th place game ===
August 22, 2026; 17:00	Puerto Rico	9-8 (OT) (3-1, 3-4, 1-3, 1-0, 1-0)	Mexico	Kingston

Game reference

=== 3rd place game ===
August 23, 2026; 11:00	Haudenosaunee	16–9 (6–5, 2–2, 4–2, 4–0)	Jamaica	Kingston

Game reference

=== Final ===
August 23, 2026; 14:00	United States	8–9 (3–2, 2–2, 3–1, 0–4)	Canada	Kingston

Game reference

== Final standings ==
Qualify to the 2027 World Lacrosse Men's Championship via standings

Rank	Team
1st place, gold medalist(s)	Canada
2nd place, silver medalist(s)	United States
3rd place, bronze medalist(s)	Haudenosaunee
4	Jamaica
5	Puerto Rico
6	Mexico
7	Colombia
8	U.S. Virgin Islands
9	Argentina

== See also ==
- 2025 Pan-American Women's Lacrosse Championship
