= Haudenosaunee men's national under-20 lacrosse team =

Men's national junior field lacrosse team representing the Haudenosaunee

Haudenosaunee Confederacy
- Nickname(s): Haudenosaunee Nationals
- WL membership: 1988
- Association: First Nations Lacrosse Association

Under-19 World Lacrosse Championships
- Appearances: 7 (first in 1992)
- Best result: Third place (1999, 2008, 2012, 2016, 2022)
- Website: haudenosauneenationals.com
Medal record
Under-19 World Lacrosse Championship
| Bronze medal – third place | 1999 U19 World |
| Bronze medal – third place | 2008 U19 World |
| Bronze medal – third place | 2012 U19 World |
| Bronze medal – third place | 2016 U19 World |
| Bronze medal – third place | 2022 U21 World |

The Haudenosaunee men's national under-20 lacrosse team represents the Haudenosaunee Confederacy in international field lacrosse competitions. They are currently ranked third in the world by the World Lacrosse and have won three straight Bronze medals.

== Under-19 World Lacrosse Championship ==
=== Overall results ===
U19 World Lacrosse Championship
| Year | Host | GP | W | L | GF | GA | Finish |
|---|---|---|---|---|---|---|---|
| 1992 | United States | 5 | 1 | 4 | 40 | 91 | 5th |
| 1996 | Japan | 6 | 1 | 5 | 47 | 120 | 4th |
| 1999 | Australia | 7 | 3 | 4 | 75 | 67 | 3rd place, bronze medalist(s) |
| 2003 | United States | 5 | 1 | 4 | 55 | 61 | 5th |
| 2008 | Canada | 8 | 5 | 3 | 123 | 107 | 3rd place, bronze medalist(s) |
| 2012 | Finland | 6 | 4 | 2 | 90 | 48 | 3rd place, bronze medalist(s) |
| 2016 | Canada | 7 | 4 | 3 | 103 | 65 | 3rd place, bronze medalist(s) |
| 2022 | Ireland | 7 | 3 | 4 | 48 | 64 | 3rd place, bronze medalist(s) |
| Total | - | 51 | 22 | 29 | 591 | 618 | 5 Bronze Medals |

=== 1992 ===
| 2 August 1992 1992 Preliminary | Haudenosaunee | 6–28 | United States | Long Island |

| August 1992 1992 Preliminary | Haudenosaunee | 8–12 | England | Long Island |

| August 1992 1992 Preliminary | Haudenosaunee | 6–26 | Australia | Long Island |

| August 1992 1992 Preliminary | Haudenosaunee | 9–16 | Canada | Long Island |

| 6 August 1992 1992 Preliminary | Haudenosaunee | 11–9 | Japan | Long Island |

=== 1996 ===
| 4 August 1996 1996 Preliminary | Haudenosaunee | 7–18 | Canada | Tokyo (Japan) |
| | | | | Stadium: Edogawa Stadium |

| 5 August 1996 1996 Preliminary | Haudenosaunee | 15–9 | Japan | Tokyo (Japan) |
| | | | | Stadium: Edogawa Stadium |

| 6 August 1996 1996 Preliminary | Haudenosaunee | 9–23 | United States | Tokyo (Japan) |
| | | | | Stadium: Edogawa Stadium |

| 6 August 1996 1996 Preliminary | Haudenosaunee | 8–24 | Australia | Tokyo (Japan) |
| | | | | Stadium: Edogawa Stadium |

| 9 August 1996 1996 Semifinal | Haudenosaunee | 10–27 | United States | Tokyo (Japan) |
| | | | | Stadium: Edogawa Stadium |

| 11 August 1996 1996 Bronze Medal | Haudenosaunee | 8–19 | Canada | Tokyo (Japan) |
| | | | | Stadium: Edogawa Stadium |

1996 Men's U-19 World Lacrosse Championship roster
| Jersey | Name | Position |
|---|---|---|
| 11 | Chris Hopps | Goalie |
| 2 | Ken Montour | Goalie |
| 3 | Jeff Powless | Goalie |
| 1 | Marshall Abrams | Defense |
| 29 | Lyal Anderson | Defense |
| 30 | Ron Cogan | Defense |
| 27 | Danny David | Defense |
| 25 | Eric Giles | Defense |
| 4 | Rodney Redeye | Defense |
| 7 | Jimbo Barnes | Midfield |
| 23 | J.D. Jones | Midfield |
| 20 | Dustin Hill | Midfield |
| 17 | Vince Longboat | Midfield |
| 6 | Nick Trudeau | Midfield |
| 15 | Ben Shenandoah | Midfield |
| 22 | Percy Shenandoah | Midfield |
| 21 | Cal Smith | Midfield |
| 19 | Evan Thomposon | Midfield |
| 25 | Emmett Printup | Midfield |
| 5 | Levi King | Midfield |
| 8 | Ray Ackley | Midfield |
| 16 | Danny Bero | Attack |
| 12 | Drew Bucktooth | Attack |
| 13 | Justin Giles | Attack |
| 10 | Vernon Hill | Attack |
| 14 | Art Powless | Attack |
| 18 | Jason Roundpoint | Attack |
| | Freeman Bucktooth | Head coach |
| | Scott Buman | Assistant Coach |
| | Rory Whipple | Assistant Coach |

=== 1999 ===
| 2 July 1999 1999 Preliminary | Haudenosaunee | 9–21 | Canada | Adelaide (Australia) |
| 10:00 (UTC+09:30) |

| 3 July 1999 1999 Preliminary | Haudenosaunee | 18-4 | Japan | Adelaide (Australia) |
| 14:30 (UTC+09:30) |

| 4 July 1999 1999 Preliminary | Haudenosaunee | 8–9 | United States | Adelaide (Australia) |
| 10:00 (UTC+09:30) |

| 6 July 1999 1999 Preliminary | Haudenosaunee | 13–9 | England | Adelaide (Australia) |
| 12:30 (UTC+09:30) |

| 7 July 1999 1999 Preliminary | Haudenosaunee | 14–15 | Australia | Adelaide (Australia) |
| 14:30 (UTC+09:30) |

| 8 July 1999 1999 Semifinals | Haudenosaunee | – | Canada | Adelaide (Australia) |
| 14:30 (UTC+09:30) |

| 10 July 1999 1999 Bronze Medal | Haudenosaunee | 13–9 | England | Adelaide (Australia) |
| 12:00 (UTC+09:30) |

1999 Men's U-19 World Lacrosse Championship roster
| Jersey | Name | Position |
|---|---|---|
| | Roger Vyse | |
| | Jeff Powless | |
| | Rodney Redeye | Defense |
| | A.J. Bucktooth | |
| | Brett Bucktooth | |
| | Taylor Watts | |
| | Lance Mitchell | Midfield |
| | Corey Sullivan | |
| | Jason Henhawk | |
| | Calvin Hill | |
| | Jesse Printup | |
| | Tyler Bucktooth | |
| | Monte Lyons | |
| | Mike Longboat | |
| | Joel Printup | |
| | Dustin Hill | |
| | Raweras Mitchell | |
| | Ken Montour | |
| | Murray Stout | |
| | Chris Powless | |
| | Russ Davis | |
| | Kim Squire | |
| 27 | Jon Tarbell | Assistant Captain |
| | Drew Bucktooth | Attack - Captain |
| | Delby Powless | Assistant Captain |
| | Ashley Hill | |
| | Freeman Bucktooth | Head coach |
| | Reggie Thorpe | Assistant Coach |
| | Gewas Schindler | Assistant Coach |
| | Dave White | Assistant Coach |
| | Rory Whipple | Assistant Coach |
| | Dale Henry | Team Manager |

=== 2003 ===
| 28 June 2003 2003 Preliminary | Haudenosaunee | 7–11 | England | Towson, Maryland |

| 29 June 2003 2003 Preliminary | Haudenosaunee | 6–14 | United States | Towson, Maryland |

| 30 June 2003 2003 Preliminary | Haudenosaunee | 10–18 | Canada | Towson, Maryland |

| 1 July 2003 2003 Preliminary | Haudenosaunee | 11–12 | Australia | Towson, Maryland |

| 5 July 2003 2003 5th Place Final | Haudenosaunee | 21–6 | Japan | Towson, Maryland |

2003 Men's U-19 World Lacrosse Championship roster
| Jersey | Name |
|---|---|
| 3 | Brandon Francis |
| 4 | Andrew Lazore |
| 16 | Grant Bucktooth |
| 15 | Jeremy Thompson |
| 23 | Mitch Nanticoke |
| 9 | Joe Hall |
| 6 | Preston Lay |
| 1 | Ross Bucktooth |
| 12 | Matthew Myke |
| 7 | Haiwha Nanticoke |
| 10 | Corey Hinton |
| 8 | Justin Hill |
| 18 | Kevin Castor |
| 2 | Joshua Van Every |
| 13 | Cody Jamieson |
| 22 | Sidney Smith |
| 19 | James Bissell |
| 21 | Rocky Thompson |
| 5 | Stewart Monture |
| 20 | Taylor Smoke |
| 17 | Jason Arias |
| 11 | Roy Tarbell |
| 14 | Lee Thomas |

=== 2008 ===
| 3 July 2008 2008 Preliminary | Haudenosaunee | 15–20 | United States | Coquitlam |
| 16:00 (UTC−07:00) | | | | Stadium: Percy Perry Stadium |

| 4 July 2008 2008 Preliminary | Haudenosaunee | 27–9 | Japan | Coquitlam |
| 12:45 (UTC−07:00) | | | | Stadium: Percy Perry Stadium |

| 5 July 2008 2008 Preliminary | Haudenosaunee | 12–15 | Canada | Coquitlam |
| 12:45 (UTC−07:00) | | | | Stadium: Percy Perry Stadium |

| 6 July 2008 2008 Preliminary | Haudenosaunee | 21–16 | England | Coquitlam |
| 19:15 (UTC−07:00) | | | | Stadium: Percy Perry Stadium |

| 7 July 2008 2008 Preliminary | Haudenosaunee | 17–14 | Australia | Coquitlam |
| 16:00 (UTC−07:00) | | | | Stadium: Percy Perry Stadium |

| 8 July 2008 2008 Quarterfinal | Haudenosaunee | 28–2 | Scotland | Coquitlam |
| 19:15 (UTC−07:00) | | | | Stadium: Percy Perry Stadium |

| 10 July 2008 2008 Semifinal | Haudenosaunee | 12–23 | Canada | Coquitlam |
| 19:15 (UTC−07:00) | | | | Stadium: Percy Perry Stadium |

| 12 July 2008 2008 Bronze Medal | Haudenosaunee | 19–10 | England | Coquitlam |
| 11:00 (UTC−07:00) | | | | Stadium: Percy Perry Stadium |

2008 Men's U-19 World Lacrosse Championship roster
| Jersey | Name | Position |
|---|---|---|
| 11 | Pierce Abrams | Midfield |
| 4 | Jon Bissell | Defense |
| 5 | Ryan Burnham | Defense |
| 21 | James Cathers | Attack |
| 22 | Andrew Cordia | Attack |
| 6 | Forrest Cox | Defense |
| 2 | H. Warren Hill | Goalie |
| 7 | K. Alexander Hill | Defense |
| 8 | Charles Jacobs | Defense |
| 23 | Peter Jacobs | Attack |
| 9 | Jason Johns | Defense |
| 13 | Jeremy Johns | Midfield |
| 10 | Michael Miller | Defense |
| 24 | Mac Mitchell | Midfield |
| 14 | Jordy Patterson | Midfield |
| 15 | Dalton Powless | Midfield |
| 16 | Aaron Printup | Midfield |
| 17 | Elijah Printup | Midfield |
| 25 | Emmett Printup | Attack |
| 18 | Randy Staats | Midfield |
| 19 | Lyle Thompson | Midfield |
| 26 | Miles Thompson | Attack |
| 3 | Jeffery White | Goalie |
| 20 | Michael White | Midfield |
| | Anthony Gray | Head coach |
| | Bill Bjorness | Assistant Coach |
| | Cam Bomberry | Assistant Coach |
| | Vince Shiffert | Assistant Coach |
| | Gewas Schindler | Assistant Coach |
| | Travis Solomon | Assistant Coach |
| | Dave Guill | Assistant Coach |
| | Bob Leary | Video/Scouting Coach |
| | J.D. Jones | Equipment Manager |
| | Joe Solomon | General Manager |
| | J.J. Blitstein | Assistant to the Interim Executive Director |

=== 2012 ===
| 13 July 2012 2012 Preliminary | Haudenosaunee | 24–2 | England | Turku (Finland) |

| 15 July 2012 2012 Preliminary | Haudenosaunee | 9–11 | Canada | Turku (Finland) |

| 16 July 2012 2012 Preliminary | Haudenosaunee | 17–9 | Australia | Turku (Finland) |

| 17 July 2012 2012 Preliminary | Haudenosaunee | 15–13 | United States | Turku (Finland) |

| 19 July 2012 2012 Semifinal | Haudenosaunee | 7–12 | United States | Turku (Finland) |

| 21 July 2012 2012 Bronze Medal | Haudenosaunee | 18–1 | England | Turku (Finland) |

=== 2016 ===
| 8 July 2016 2016 Preliminary | Haudenosaunee | 22–4 | England | Coquitlam |
| 19:30 (UTC−07:00) | | Report | | Stadium: Percy Perry Stadium |

| 10 July 2016 2016 Preliminary | Haudenosaunee | 9–12 | Canada | Coquitlam |
| 19:30 (UTC−07:00) | | Report | | Stadium: Percy Perry Stadium |

| 11 July 2016 2016 Preliminary | Haudenosaunee | 3–17 | United States | Coquitlam |
| 19:30 (UTC−07:00) | | Report | | Stadium: Percy Perry Stadium |

| 12 July 2016 2016 Preliminary | Haudenosaunee | 16–5 | Australia | Coquitlam |
| 19:30 (UTC−07:00) | | Report | | Stadium: Percy Perry Stadium |

| 13 July 2016 2016 Playoff Round One | Haudenosaunee | 22–5 | Ireland | Coquitlam |
| 12:30 (UTC−07:00) | | Report | | Stadium: Percy Perry Stadium |

| 14 July 2016 2016 Semifinal | Haudenosaunee | 11–14 | Canada | Coquitlam |
| 19:30 (UTC−07:00) | | Report | | Stadium: Percy Perry Stadium |

| 16 July 2016 2016 Bronze Medal | Haudenosaunee | 20-8 | Australia | Coquitlam |
| 13:30 (UTC−07:00) | | Report | | Stadium: Percy Perry Stadium |

2016 Men's U-19 World Lacrosse Championship roster
| Jersey | Name | Nation | Territory |
|---|---|---|---|
| 46 | Liam Anderson | Tuscarora Nation | Tuscarora |
| 71 | Tyler Armstrong | Mohawk Nation | Akwesasne |
| 15 | Sekawnee Baker | Squamish Nation | Squamish |
| 13 | Brody Bartell | Cherokee Nation | Cherokee |
| 18 | Matthew Bennett | Onondaga Nation | Onondaga |
| 23 | Tyson Bomberry | Oneida Nation | Six Nations |
| 42 | Percy Booth | Seneca Nation | Onondaga |
| 5 | Devon Buckshot | Onondaga Nation | Onondaga |
| 4 | Chaunce Hill | Seneca Nation | Tonawanda |
| 2 | Owen Hill | Seneca Nation | Tonawanda |
| 74 | Cam Horn | Mohawk Nation | Kahnawake |
| 39 | Doug Jamieson | Mohawk Nation | Six Nations |
| 17 | Ron John | Seneca Nation | Seneca |
| 7 | Mitch Laffin | Onondaga Nation | Onondaga |
| 33 | Colyn Lyons | Mohawk Nation | Onondaga |
| 19 | Teioshontathe McComber | Mohawk Nation | Kahnawake |
| 32 | Jonah Mohawk | Seneca Nation | Seneca |
| 1 | Tehoka Nanticoke | Mohawk Nation | Six Nations |
| 21 | Tonatiuh Salinas | Tuscarora Nation | Six Nations |
| 3 | Chase Scanlan | Seneca Nation | Seneca |
| 43 | Austin Staats | Mohawk Nation | Six Nations |
| 63 | Jerry Staats | Mohawk Nation | Six Nations |
| 28 | Trevor Stacey | Mohawk Nation | Kahnawake |
| 88 | Skye Sunday | Mohawk Nation | Akwesasne |
| 6 | Larson Sundown | Seneca Nation | Tonwanda |
| 66 | Skkyler Thomas | Mohawk Nation | Akwesasne |
| 36 | Sherman Williams | Seneca Nation | Seneca |

=== 2022 ===
| 10 August 2022 2022 Preliminary | Haudenosaunee | 14-3 | England | Limerick |
| 13:00 (UTC+01:00) | | Report |

| 13 August 2022 2022 Preliminary | Haudenosaunee | 2-13 | United States | Limerick |
| 19:00 (UTC+01:00) | | Report |

| 14 August 2022 2022 Preliminary | Haudenosaunee | 7-13 | Australia | Limerick |
| 16:00 (UTC+01:00) | | Report |

| 15 August 2022 2022 Preliminary | Haudenosaunee | 6-14 | Canada | Limerick |
| 19:00 (UTC+01:00) | | Report |

| 17 August 2022 2022 Quarterfinals | Haudenosaunee | 7-5 | England | Limerick |
| 16:00 (UTC+01:00) | | Report |

| 18 August 2022 2022 Semifinals | Haudenosaunee | 2-10 | United States | Limerick |
| 19:00 (UTC+01:00) | | Report |

| 20 August 2022 2022 Bronze Medal | Haudenosaunee | 10-6 | Australia | Limerick |
| 16:00 (UTC+01:00) | | Report |

2022 Men's U-21 World Lacrosse Championship roster
| Jersey | Name |
|---|---|
| 9 | David Anderson |
| 11 | Rowisonkies Barnes |
| 13 | Efrain Barreto Jr. |
| 16 | Tryton Benedict |
| 5 | Cobie Cree |
| 19 | Trey Deere |
| 45 | Anahalihs Doxtator |
| 10 | Gregory Elijah-Brown |
| 37 | Aidan Fearn |
| 12 | Julian Freeman |
| 21 | James Gowland |
| 20 | Mason Homer |
| 77 | Stone Jacobs |
| 22 | Koleton Marquis |
| 2 | Teharonhiorens McComber |
| 4 | Jacob Piseno |
| 7 | Douglas Powless |
| 14 | Clay Scanlan |
| 3 | Keelan Seneca |
| 17 | Dylan Snow |
| 1 | Sakaronhiotane Thompson |
| 8 | Jack VanValkenburgh |
| 83 | Amos Whitcomb |

=== Awards ===
| Event | Member | Award |
|---|---|---|
| 1999 U19 WLC | Drew Bucktooth | All World Team - Attack |
| 1999 U19 WLC | Lance Mitchell | All World Team - Midfield |
| 1999 U19 WLC | Rodney Redeye | All World Team - Defense |
| 2012 U19 WLC | Lyle Thompson | All World Team - Midfield MVP |
| 2012 U19 WLC | Seth Oakes | All World Team - Attack |
| 2012 U19 WLC | Lyle Thompson | All World Team - Midfield |
| 2012 U19 WLC | Warren Hill | All World Team - Goalie |
| 2016 U19 WLC | Tehoka Nanticoke | All World Team - Attack MVP |
| 2016 U19 WLC | Tehoka Nanticoke | All World Team - Attack |
| 2016 U19 WLC | Austin Staats | All World Team - Attack |

== Other tournaments and games ==
=== 1990s ===
| 24 July 1993 Glastonbury Jr Lacrosse Tournament | Haudenosaunee | 6–8 | Unknown | Glastonbury, Connecticut |
| 10:00 (UTC−04:00) |

| 24 July 1993 Glastonbury Jr Lacrosse Tournament | Haudenosaunee | 5–13 | Syracuse Orange | Glastonbury, Connecticut |
| 13:00 (UTC−04:00) |

| 24 July 1993 Glastonbury Jr Lacrosse Tournament | Haudenosaunee | 8–0 | Boston College Eagles | Glastonbury, Connecticut |
| 16:00 (UTC−04:00) |

| 24 July 1993 Glastonbury Jr Lacrosse Tournament | Haudenosaunee | 13–4 | Hofstra Pride | Glastonbury, Connecticut |

| 25 July 1993 Glastonbury Jr Lacrosse Tournament | Haudenosaunee | – | Unknown | Glastonbury, Connecticut |
| 08:00 (UTC−04:00) |

| 25 July 1993 Glastonbury Jr Lacrosse Tournament Semifinals | Haudenosaunee | 5–8 | Unknown | Glastonbury, Connecticut |
| 11:00 (UTC−04:00) |

=== 2010s ===
| 18 February 2012 Friendly | Haudenosaunee | 7–11 | Brown Bears | Providence, Rhode Island |
| 12:00 (UTC−05:00) | | | | Stadium: Meister-Kavan Field |
