= Doug Brown (gridiron football) =

Canadian gridiron football player (born 1974)

No. 97
- Position: Defensive tackle

Personal information
- Born: September 29, 1974 (age 52); New Westminster, British Columbia, Canada
- Listed height: 6 ft 8 in (2.03 m)
- Listed weight: 290 lb (132 kg)

Career information
- University: Simon Fraser
- CFL draft: 1997: 1st round, 5th overall pick

Career history
- 1997: Calgary Stampeders*
- 1997: Buffalo Bills*
- 1998–1999: Washington Redskins
- 2001–2011: Winnipeg Blue Bombers
- * Offseason or practice squad member only

Awards and highlights
- 7× CFL All-Star (2001, 2002, 2006–2010); 7× CFL East All-Star (2001, 2006–2011); CFL West All-Star (2002); CFL's Most Outstanding Canadian Award (2001)
- Stats at Pro Football Reference
- Stats at CFL.ca (archive)
- Canadian Football Hall of Fame (Class of 2016)

Douglas Gordon Brown (born September 29, 1974) is a Canadian former professional football defensive tackle in the National Football League (NFL) and Canadian Football League (CFL). He played college football at Simon Fraser University. Brown won the CFL's Most Outstanding Canadian Award in 2001. He played for the Winnipeg Blue Bombers from 2001 until his retirement in 2011, competing in three Grey Cups: 2001, 2007, and 2011. He was a CFL All-Star eight times.

== Career ==
Brown was drafted by the Calgary Stampeders 5th overall in the 1997 CFL draft. However, he did not play a game with them and signed with the Buffalo Bills of the NFL, spending his entire time there on the practice squad. Following that he went to play for the Washington Redskins where he played ten games with the NFL team.

The 2000 season was a wash, but the end of the season saw his rights traded to Winnipeg from Calgary. He started playing with the Bombers for the 2001 CFL season which saw him named as the CFL's Most Outstanding Canadian and a visit to the 2001 Grey Cup game which the Bombers ended up losing. He soon acquired the nickname "Big Bird" and again won as Winnipeg's MOC award again the following season.

Next season, in 2004, Brown won his third recognition as the Bombers' MOC and also won the award for the Most Outstanding Defensive Player. 2006 was another strong season, and arguably his strongest with the Blue Bombers. However, he finished as runner up for the Most Outstanding Canadian award that year. Brown went to the 2007 Grey Cup, his second appearance in the penultimate CFL, but again came up short losing by four points to the Saskatchewan Roughriders.

Brown won his fifth CFL All-Star recognition in 2008 and again finished as runner-up for the MODP award. 2009 saw a return to recognition for Brown where he again won Winnipeg's MOC and MODP awards. Despite being one of the oldest players in the CFL, Brown continued to excel during the 2010 season. He finished with his seventh CFL All-Star naming that year.

The 2011 CFL season saw Brown as a member of the self-titled "Swaggerville" defence for Winnipeg, which was one of the top defences in the league at that time. The 2011 season also saw Brown win his eighth East Division all-star nod.

In 2016, he was inducted into the Canadian Football Hall of Fame.

=== Statistics ===
Regular season		Tackles			Interceptions				Fumbles
Year	Team	Tackles	Stt	Sacks	Int	Yards	Long	TD	Fumbles	Yards	Long	TD
2009	WPG	50	0	6	0	0	0	0	1	0	0	0
2010	WPG	49	0	5	0	0	0	0	1	0	0	0
2011	WPG	29	0	3	0	0	0	0	0	0	0	0
CFL totals		128	0	14	0	0	0	0	2	0	0	0

== Personal ==
Brown credited former Coquitlam Cheetahs track and field coach Percy Perry with developing his running which enabled his progression to pro football.

He currently writes a weekly sports column for the Winnipeg Free Press. Brown also serves as colour commentator for Blue Bomber broadcasts on CJOB 680 AM radio in Winnipeg.

Brown is also currently a KidSport Winnipeg Sport Ambassador, helping run an annual Football Camp for recipients of KidSport Winnipeg funding.

He currently resides in Winnipeg
