= United States women's national junior lacrosse team =

- Association: US Lacrosse
- Head coach: Kelly Amonte Hiller
- Website: www.usalacrosse.com/us-u20-women
Medal record
Women's U20 World Championship
Gold medal – first place	1999 Perth
Gold medal – first place	2003 Baltimore
Gold medal – first place	2007 Peterborough
Gold medal – first place	2011 Hanover
Gold medal – first place	2019 Peterborough
Gold medal – first place	2024 Hong Kong
Silver medal – second place	1995 Haverford
Silver medal – second place	2015 Edinburgh

The United States women's national junior lacrosse team is the women junior national under-20 team for United States. The team has won six times World Lacrosse Women's U20 Championship, the most recent in 2024.

== Team records ==
=== Women's U20 World Championship ===
World Lacrosse Women's U20 Championship record
Year	Result	Matches	Wins	Draws	Losses	PF	PA	Coach
(United States) 1995	Runner-up							
(Australia) 1999	Champions							
(United States) 2003	Champions							
(Canada) 2007	Champions							
(Germany) 2011	Champions							
(Scotland) 2015	Runner-up							
(Canada) 2019	Champions	7	7	0	0	128	20	
(Hong Kong) 2024	Champions	7	7	0	0	211	20	
Total	8/8	—						
