= Perry Stadium =

Perry Stadium may refer to:

- Doyt Perry Stadium in Bowling Green, Ohio
- Percy Perry Stadium in Coquitlam, British Columbia
- Bush Stadium in Indianapolis, Indiana, called Perry Stadium 1931–1941
