= Sandy Beveridge =

Canadian football player (born 1981)

No. 19
- Position: Safety

Personal information
- Born: December 9, 1981 (age 44); Port Coquitlam, British Columbia
- Listed height: 6 ft 2 in (1.88 m)
- Listed weight: 214 lb (97 kg)

Career information
- High school: Terry Fox
- University: University of British Columbia
- CFL draft: 2003: undrafted

Career history
- 2003–2010: Hamilton Tiger-Cats
- Stats at CFL.ca (archive)

Sandy Beveridge (born December 9, 1981) is a Canadian former football defensive back who played eight seasons on special teams and as a defensive back for the Hamilton Tiger-Cats of the Canadian Football League. He was signed by the Tiger-Cats as an undrafted free agent in 2003. Beveridge announced his retirement on July 26, 2010 after he had accepted a firefighter position with the Hamilton Fire Department.

Beveridge played CIS football for the UBC Thunderbirds and worked with former Coquitlam Cheetahs track and field coach Percy Perry on developing his running.
