= 2019 FIL Women's U-19 World Lacrosse Championship =

International women's lacrosse tournament

Tournament details
- Host country: Canada
- Venue(s): 2 (in 1 host city)
- Dates: August 1–10
- Teams: 22

Final positions
- Champions: United States (5th title)
- Runners-up: Canada
- Third place: Australia
- Fourth place: England

The 2019 FIL Women's U-19 World Lacrosse Championship was the 7th FIL Women's Under-19 World Lacrosse Championship, an international field lacrosse tournament that is held every four years and is sponsored by the Federation of International Lacrosse. It took place from August 1–10, 2019 in Peterborough, Ontario, Canada.

The United States won the fifth titles, after defeated Canada 13–3 in final.

== Preliminary round ==
=== Pool A ===
Rank	Team	GP	W	L	GF	GA	DIF	PTS
1	United States	3	3	0	43	11	+32	6
2	Canada	3	2	1	30	26	+4	4
3	England	3	1	2	20	45	-25	2
4	Australia	3	0	3	18	29	-11	0

=== Pool B ===
Rank	Team	GP	W	L	GF	GA	DIF	PTS
1	Japan	3	3	0	54	14	+40	6
2	New Zealand	3	2	1	36	23	+13	4
3	Wales	3	1	2	22	43	-21	2
4	Scotland	3	0	3	13	45	-32	0

=== Pool C ===
Rank	Team	GP	W	L	GF	GA	DIF	PTS
1	Germany	4	4	0	57	26	+31	8
2	China	4	3	1	65	35	+30	6
3	South Korea	4	2	2	54	58	-4	4
4	Kenya	4	1	3	38	38	0	2
5	Jamaica（E）	4	0	4	18	75	-57	0

=== Pool D ===
Rank	Team	GP	W	L	GF	GA	DIF	PTS
1	Czech Republic	3	3	0	48	16	+32	6
2	Mexico	3	2	1	28	27	+1	4
3	Chinese Taipei	4	2	2	35	40	-5	4
4	Ireland	4	0	4	26	54	-28	0

=== Pool E ===
Rank	Team	GP	W	L	GF	GA	DIF	PTS
1	Puerto Rico	4	4	0	75	11	+64	8
2	Haudenosaunee	4	3	1	72	21	+51	6
3	Hong Kong	4	2	2	39	54	-15	4
4	Israel	4	1	3	28	56	-28	2
5	Belgium（E）	4	0	4	7	79	-72	0

== Elimination round ==
Team 1	Score	Team 2
England	18–9	China
Chinese Taipei	10–9	Ireland
Puerto Rico	12–11	New Zealand
Australia	21–2	Mexico
Kenya	4–13	Israel
Japan	11–9	Haudenosaunee
Germany	10–7	Scotland
Canada	21–2	South Korea
Czech Republic	10–12	Wales
United States	25–0	Hong Kong

== Quarterfinals round ==
Team 1	Score	Team 2
Australia	8–7	Japan
England	10–8	New Zealand
Germany	1–21	Canada
Wales	0–26	United States

== Championship round ==
Semifinals
1	United States	21
4	Australia	6
3	Canada	10
2	England	7

Finals
United States	13
Canada	3
Third place
Australia	13
England	8

== Final standings ==
Rank	Team
1st place, gold medalist(s)	United States
2nd place, silver medalist(s)	Canada
3rd place, bronze medalist(s)	Australia
4	England
5	Japan
6	New Zealand
7	Wales
8	Germany
9	Puerto Rico
10	Iroquois
11	Scotland
12	Hong Kong
13	Czech Republic
14	China
15	Mexico
16	South Korea
17	Israel
18	Kenya
19	Ireland
20	Chinese Taipei
21	Jamaica
22	Belgium
