= World Lacrosse Women's U20 Championship =

International youth women's lacrosse championship

World Lacrosse Women's U-20 Championship
- Current season, competition or edition: 2024 World Lacrosse Women's U20 Championship
- Sport: Women's lacrosse
- Founded: 1995; 31 years ago
- Organising body: World Lacrosse
- Countries: World Lacrosse member nations
- Most recent champions: United States (6th title)
- Most titles: United States (6 titles)
- Related competitions: World Lacrosse Women's World Championship; World Lacrosse Men's U20 Championship
- Website: Official website

The World Lacrosse Women's U20 Championship, formerly known as the World Lacrosse Women's U19 Championship, are held every four years to award world championships for the under-20 age group in women's lacrosse. The tournaments are sanctioned by World Lacrosse.

== History ==
The championships were first held for women in 1995. The 2015 games were held in Edinburgh, Scotland. The Haudenosaunee Nationals women's lacrosse team could not participate due to British passport requirements. Canada won its first gold medal, defeating the United States 9–8 in the final.

The 2019 games saw the United States decisively beat Canada 13–3 in Peterborough, Canada.

The next tournament was held as an under-20 event in 2024 in Hong Kong, Hong Kong.

== Results ==
Year	Host	Champions	Score	Runner-up
1995	Haverford, United States	Australia	5–4	United States
1999	Perth, Australia	United States	15–8	Australia
2003	Baltimore, United States	United States	21–8	Australia
2007	Peterborough, Canada	United States	18–3	Australia
2011	Hanover, Germany	United States	14–11	Australia
2015	Edinburgh, Scotland	Canada	9–8	United States
2019	Peterborough, Canada	United States	13–3	Canada
2024	Hong Kong, China	United States	23–6	Canada

== Medal table ==
Rank	Nation	Gold	Silver	Bronze	Total
1	United States	6	2	0	8
2	Australia	1	4	1	6
3	Canada	1	2	3	6
4	England	0	0	3	3
5	Japan	0	0	1	1
Totals (5 entries)		8	8	8	24

== Past results ==
Team	1995 (United States) (7)	1999 (Australia) (7)	2003 (United States) (7)	2007 (Canada) (11)	2011 (Germany) (12)	2015 (Scotland) (14)	2019 (Canada) (22)	2024 (Hong Kong) (20)
Australia	1st	2nd	2nd	2nd	2nd	4th	3rd	4th
Belgium							22nd	
Canada	4th	3rd	3rd	4th	3rd	1st	2nd	2nd
China							14th	9th
Colombia						12th		
Czech Republic				9th	9th	10th	13th	
England	3rd	4th	4th	3rd	4th	3rd	4th	6th
Finland						11th		
Germany				11th	10th	9th	8th	19th
Haudenosaunee				6th	8th		10th	11th
Hong Kong							12th	16th
Ireland							19th	10th
Israel						14th	17th	13th
Italy								8th
Jamaica							21st	20th
Japan	7th	6th	5th	5th	7th	6th	5th	3rd
Kenya							18th	
Mexico							15th	12th
Netherlands					12th			
New Zealand				10th	11th	5th	6th	15th
Puerto Rico							9th	5th
Scotland	5th	7th	7th	7th	6th	8th	11th	17th
South Korea						13th	16th	18th
Chinese Taipei							20th	14th
United States	2nd	1st	1st	1st	1st	2nd	1st	1st
Wales	6th	5th	6th	8th	5th	7th	7th	7th

== See also ==
- World Lacrosse Women's World Championship
- World Lacrosse Men's U20 Championship
