= Percy Perry =

Canadian track and field coach

Percy Adolphus Perry (June 12, 1930 – January 5, 2005) was a Canadian track and field coach from Coquitlam, British Columbia.

== Personal life ==
Perry was born in Port of Spain, Trinidad, and played on Trinidad's national soccer team before immigrating to Canada. Perry worked for the city of New Westminster, and was responsible for the design of the Westminster Quay boardwalk.

== Career ==
Perry took over as head coach of Coquitlam Cheetahs track and field club in 1989 when it was on the verge of folding. He stabilized the club's operations, and then worked as an advisor for the construction of Town Centre Stadium, which the Cheetahs moved to after the 1991 B.C. Summer Games. During Perry's tenure with the Cheetahs, the club produced five Canadian Olympians, including Perry's daughter, Tara Self. Perry also worked on training several college football players who went on to pro careers, including Bret Anderson, Sandy Beveridge, and most notably Doug Brown, who stated that Perry "pretty much taught me how to run".

Perry was a past member of the B.C. Athletics board of directors, and founded the Cheetahs' Jesse Bent Memorial Invitational track and field meet.

Norma and Percy Perry were inducted into the B.C. Athletics Hall of Fame in 2002.

== Death ==
Perry died of cancer on Wednesday, January 5, 2005. Town Centre Stadium was renamed to Percy Perry Stadium the following year.
