= Haudenosaunee women's national under-20 lacrosse team =

Women's national junior field lacrosse team representing the Haudenosaunee

Haudenosaunee Confederacy
- Nickname(s): Haudenosaunee Nationals
- WL membership: 2008
- Association: First Nations Lacrosse Association

Under-19 World Lacrosse Championships
- Appearances: 2 (first in 2007)
- Best result: 6th Place (2007)
- Website: haudenosauneenationals.com
Medal record
Nike Cup
Gold medal – first place	2015 Nike Cup

The Haudenosaunee women's national under-20 lacrosse team represents the Iroquois Confederacy in international women's lacrosse competitions. They are currently ranked tenth by World Lacrosse following the 2019 world championship.

The Haudenosaunee U19 women's team won the 2015 Nike Cup - Orange Division championship defeating STEPS Lacrosse Philly. The team was forced to withdraw from the 2015 U19 World Lacrosse Championship in Scotland as the United Kingdom did not accept their Iroquois passports.

In 2021, the Haudenosaunee Nationals organization was disbanded and the women's team was rebranded under the Iroquois Nationals organization. In June of 2022, the Nationals dropped Iroquois from their name, adopting the name the Haudenosaunee Nationals.

== Under-20 World Lacrosse Championship ==
=== Overall results ===
U19 World Lacrosse Championship
Year	Host	GP	W	L	GF	GA	Finish
2007	Canada	6	4	2	77	60	6th
2011	Germany	8	0	8	44	171	8th
2019	Canada	8	5	3	127	48	10th
2024	Canada	6	3	3	77	70	10th
Total	-	28	12	16	325	349	-

=== 2007 ===
4 August 2007 2007 Preliminary	Haudenosaunee	15-7	New Zealand	Peterborough, Ontario (Canada)
16:30 (UTC-04:00)				Stadium: Justin Chiu Stadium

5 August 2007 2007 Preliminary	Haudenosaunee	18-10	Czech Republic	Peterborough, Ontario (Canada)
11:30 (UTC-04:00)				Stadium: Justin Chiu Stadium

6 August 2007 2007 Preliminary	Haudenosaunee	16-4	Germany	Peterborough, Ontario (Canada)
16:30 (UTC-04:00)				Stadium: Justin Chiu Stadium

8 August 2007 2007 Quarterfinal	Haudenosaunee	9-20	Canada	Peterborough, Ontario (Canada)
14:00 (UTC-04:00)				Stadium: Justin Chiu Stadium

9 August 2007 2007 Consolation Semifinal	Haudenosaunee	15-4	Wales	Peterborough, Ontario (Canada)
16:30 (UTC-04:00)				Stadium: Justin Chiu Stadium

11 August 2007 2007 5th Place Final	Haudenosaunee	4-15	Japan	Peterborough, Ontario (Canada)
9:30 (UTC-04:00)				Stadium: Justin Chiu Stadium

=== 2011 ===
4 August 2011 2011 Preliminary	Haudenosaunee	1-21	Canada	Hanover (Germany)
11:00 (UTC+02:00)				Stadium: Erika Fisch Stadium

5 August 2011 2011 Preliminary	Haudenosaunee	0-21	Australia	Hanover (Germany)
17:00 (UTC+02:00)				Stadium: Hannover 78

6 August 2011 2011 Preliminary	Haudenosaunee	3-15	United States	Hanover (Germany)
10:00 (UTC+02:00)				Stadium: Hannover 78

7 August 2011 2011 Preliminary	Haudenosaunee	12-29	Japan	Hanover (Germany)
19:00 (UTC+02:00)				Stadium: Erika Fisch Stadium

9 August 2011 2011 Preliminary	Haudenosaunee	3-27	England	Hanover (Germany)
17:00 (UTC+02:00)				Stadium: Hannover 78

10 August 2011 2011 Consolation Quarterfinal	Haudenosaunee	5-20	Canada	Hanover (Germany)
17:00 (UTC+02:00)				Stadium: Hannover 78

11 August 2011 2011 Consolation Semifinal	Haudenosaunee	8-15	Wales	Hanover (Germany)
16:30 (UTC+02:00)				Stadium: Hannover 78

13 August 2011 2011 7th Place Final	Haudenosaunee	12-23	Japan	Hanover (Germany)
11:00 (UTC+02:00)				Stadium: Erika Fisch Stadium

2011 FIL Women's U-19 World Lacrosse Championship roster
Jersey	Name	Position	Age	Club/School
1	Alisha Jacobs	Attack	17	Massena High School
2	Aiesha General-Hill	Attack	17	McKinnon Park High School
3	Keira Thompson	Midfield	16	Salomon River High School
4	Marissa Harring	Midfield	17	Lakeshore High School
6	Lauren Scanlan	Midfield	18	Lakeshore High School
7	Alie Jimerson	Midfield	15	Lakeshore High School
8	Iris Bannon	Midfield	16	Orangeville
9	Chalane Morrison	Midfield	15	Delta, British Columbia
11	Aryien Stephens	Defense	17	Lakeshore High School
12	Shiana Skye	Defense	16	Six Nations
13	Georgia Larden	Midfield	15	Delta, British Columbia
16	Lenna Henry	Defense	16	Six Nations
18	Amalee Elkins-Jacobs	Attack	17	Six Nations
19	Kristiana Ferguson	Midfield	18	Niagara Wheatfield High School
22	Vivian Curry	Midfield	17	Lakeshore High School
23	Cassandra Minerd	Midfield	16	Lafayette High School
26	Marissa Gabriel	Goalie	18	Liverpool High School
30	Chelsea Gibson	Defense/Goalie	17	Six Nations
	Elizabeth Ford	Head coach		
	Kelly Gallagher	Assistant Coach		
	June Snowden	Trainer		
	Melissa Rank	General Manager		

=== 2019 ===
1 August 2019 2019 Preliminary	Haudenosaunee	19-1	Belgium	Peterborough, Ontario (Canada)
9:30 (UTC-04:00)		Report

2 August 2019 2019 Preliminary	Haudenosaunee	21-3	Israel	Peterborough, Ontario (Canada)
14:00 (UTC-04:00)		Report

3 August 2019 2019 Preliminary	Haudenosaunee	24-5	Hong Kong	Peterborough, Ontario (Canada)
14:00 (UTC-04:00)		Report

5 August 2019 2019 Preliminary	Haudenosaunee	8-12	Puerto Rico	Peterborough, Ontario (Canada)
18:00 (UTC-04:00)		Report

6 August 2019 2019 Championship	Haudenosaunee	9-11	Japan	Peterborough, Ontario (Canada)
14:00 (UTC-04:00)		Report

7 August 2019 2019 Consolation Quarterfinal	Haudenosaunee	19-3	Mexico	Peterborough, Ontario (Canada)
09:00 (UTC-04:00)		Report

8 August 2019 2019 Consolation Semifinal	Haudenosaunee	20-5	Hong Kong	Peterborough, Ontario (Canada)
15:30 (UTC-04:00)		Report

9 August 2019 2019 9th Place	Haudenosaunee	7-8	Puerto Rico	Peterborough, Ontario (Canada)
17:00 (UTC-04:00)		Report

2019 Women's U-19 World Lacrosse Championship roster
Jersey	Name	Position
	Noelani Cornfield	
21	Tashawni Cornfield	
25	Paige Crandall	Goalie
13	Callison Grace Foreman	
18	Lois Garlow	
9	Kimberly Gibson	
12	Brooklyn Hill	
17	Ella Jimerson	
24	Jalyn Jimerson	
27	Maggie Jean Jimerson	
5	Fantasy Jimerson-Kenjockety	Goalie
3	Leini Blair Johnson	
19	Jacelyn Lazore	
23	Mirabella Christine Lazore	
	Jenna Locke	
0	Kaya Solana Maracle	
1	Beretta Santana	
7	Scotia Snyder	
4	Kendall Sage Tabobandung	
	Ronnie Davis	Head coach
	Katie Rowan	Assistant Coach
	Leah Gallagher	Assistant Coach
	Taylor Frink	Assistant Coach
	Fernando Pinea	Trainer
	Kathy Smith	VIP
	Tia Schindler	Manager
	Savannah Smith	Manager

=== 2024 ===
16 August 2024 2024 Pool Play	Haudenosaunee	19-8	Korea	Mong Kok, Hong Kong
12:00 (UTC+08:00)		Report		Stadium: Mong Kok Stadium

17 August 2024 2024 Pool Play	Haudenosaunee	4-22	Canada	Mong Kok, Hong Kong
18:30 (UTC+08:00)		Report		Stadium: Mong Kok Stadium

19 August 2024 2024 Pool Play	Haudenosaunee	24-4	Chinese Taipei	Mong Kok, Hong Kong
13:30 (UTC+08:00)		Report		Stadium: Mong Kok Stadium

20 August 2024 2024 Pool Play	Haudenosaunee	6-8	Wales	Mong Kok, Hong Kong
11:00 (UTC+08:00)		Report		Stadium: Mong Kok Stadium

21 August 2024 2024 9th-12th	Haudenosaunee	8-14	China	Mong Kok, Hong Kong
19:00 (UTC+08:00)		Report		Stadium: Mong Kok Stadium

23 August 2024 2024 11th	Haudenosaunee	16-14	Mexico	Mong Kok, Hong Kong
08:30 (UTC+08:00)		Report		Stadium: Mong Kok Stadium

2024 Women's U-20 World Lacrosse Championship roster
Jersey	Name	Position
21	Paisley Cook	M
5	Avery Doran	A
29	Brooklyn Hill	M
27	Addison Jimerson	M
7	Laelle Jimerson	D, M
22	Wynter Jock	A, M
28	Kyleeya Johnson	D
12	Marina Kane	M
19	Azalea Lazore	M
10	Jianna Lazore	A
2	Chloe Luther	M, D
18	Kaya Maracle	D, M
45	Mia Mitchell	A
8	Jacella Nephew	A
88	Kendyl Pollack	A, M
30	Sophie Powless	G
42	Kimaura Schindler	D
31	Kimora Swamp	G
4	Ava Tallchief	A, M
44	Tallis Tarbell	A
24	Sophia Watts	D
14	Gracie Williams	A, M

== Other tournaments and games ==
=== 2010s ===
2 July 2015 2015 Nike Cup - Orange Division Championship	Haudenosaunee	-	STEPS Lacrosse Philly	Syracuse, New York (United States)

25 July 2019 Friendly	Haudenosaunee	-	Monster Girls Lax	Rochester, New York (United States)
