= 2011 FIL Women's U-19 World Lacrosse Championship =

International women's lacrosse tournament

- 2011 FIL Women's U-19 World Lacrosse Championship official logo

Tournament details
- Host country: Germany
- Venue: 2 (in 1 host city)
- Dates: August 3–13, 2011
- Teams: 10

Final positions
- Champions: United States (4th title)
- Runners-up: Australia
- Third place: Canada
- Fourth place: England

The 2011 FIL Women's U-19 World Lacrosse Championship was the 5th FIL Women's Under-19 World Lacrosse Championship, an international field lacrosse tournament that is held every four years and is sponsored by the Federation of International Lacrosse. It took place from August 3–13, 2011 in Hanover, Germany. The games were played at Sportpark Hannover on two fields—Erika Fisch Stadium and Club Hannover 78. The United States team came into the tournament as the defending champion.

The United States won the fourth consecutive titles, after defeated Australia 14–11 in final.

== Preliminary round ==
Ten participating teams were placed in the following two groups. After playing a round-robin, all six teams from Group A will advance to the championship round along with the top two teams from Group B. The remaining four teams in Group B will compete in the consolation round for placings nine through twelve.

=== Pool A ===
Team	GP	W	L	GF	GA	DIF	PTS	Advanced to
United States	5	5	0	83	26	+57	10	Quarter-finals
Australia	5	4	1	69	46	+23	8	Quarter-finals
Canada	5	3	2	62	43	+19	6	Quarter-finals
Japan	5	2	3	62	69	–7	4	Quarter-finals
England	5	1	4	62	60	+2	2	Quarter-finals
Haudenosaunee	5	0	5	19	113	–94	0	Quarter-finals

All times are local (UTC+2).

4 August 2011; 11:00	Haudenosaunee	1–21	Canada	Erika Fisch Stadium, Hanover

4 August 2011; 17:00	United States	19–5	Japan	Club Hannover 78, Hanover

4 August 2011; 19:00	Australia	15–10	England	Erika Fisch Stadium, Hanover

5 August 2011; 13:00	England	10–13	Japan	Club Hannover 78, Hanover

5 August 2011; 15:00	United States	13–6	Canada	Erika Fisch Stadium, Hanover

5 August 2011; 17:00	Australia	21–0	Haudenosaunee	Club Hannover 78, Hanover

6 August 2011; 10:00	United States	15–3	Haudenosaunee	Club Hannover 78, Hanover

6 August 2011; 11:30	Japan	7–15	Australia	Erika Fisch Stadium, Hanover

6 August 2011; 19:00	Canada	13–10	England	Erika Fisch Stadium, Hanover

7 August 2011; 15:00	England	5–16	United States	Erika Fisch Stadium, Hanover

7 August 2011; 17:00	Canada	9–11	Australia	Club Hannover 78, Hanover

7 August 2011; 19:00	Japan	29–12	Haudenosaunee	Erika Fisch Stadium, Hanover

9 August 2011; 13:00	Canada	13–8	Japan	Club Hannover 78, Hanover

9 August 2011; 17:00	Haudenosaunee	3–27	England	Club Hannover 78, Hanover

9 August 2011; 19:00	Australia	7–20	United States	Erika Fisch Stadium, Hanover

=== Pool B ===
Team	GP	W	L	GF	GA	DIF	PTS	Advanced to
Czech Republic	0	0	0	0	0	0	0	
Germany	0	0	0	0	0	0	0	
Netherlands	0	0	0	0	0	0	0	
New Zealand	0	0	0	0	0	0	0	
Scotland	0	0	0	0	0	0	0	
Wales	0	0	0	0	0	0	0	

All times are local (UTC+2).

3 August 2011; 15:00	Germany	15:00	Czech Republic	Erika Fisch Stadium, Hanover

4 August 2011; 13:00	Netherlands	13:00	New Zealand	Club Hannover 78, Hanover

4 August 2011; 15:00	Scotland	15:00	Wales	Erika Fisch Stadium, Hanover

5 August 2011; 10:00	Germany	10:00	New Zealand	Club Hannover 78, Hanover

5 August 2011; 11:30	Scotland	11:30	Netherlands	Erika Fisch Stadium, Hanover

5 August 2011; 19:00	Czech Republic	19:00	Wales	Erika Fisch Stadium, Hanover

6 August 2011; 13:00	Wales	13:00	Netherlands	Club Hannover 78, Hanover

6 August 2011; 15:00	Czech Republic	15:00	New Zealand	Erika Fisch Stadium, Hanover

6 August 2011; 17:00	Germany	17:00	Scotland	Club Hannover 78, Hanover

7 August 2011; 10:00	Netherlands	10:00	Czech Republic	Club Hannover 78, Hanover

7 August 2011; 11:30	Scotland	11:30	New Zealand	Erika Fisch Stadium, Hanover

7 August 2011; 13:00	Wales	13:00	Germany	Club Hannover 78, Hanover

9 August 2011; 10:00	Czech Republic	10:00	Scotland	Club Hannover 78, Hanover

9 August 2011; 11:30	New Zealand	11:30	Wales	Erika Fisch Stadium, Hanover

9 August 2011; 15:00	Germany	15:00	Netherlands	Erika Fisch Stadium, Hanover

== Consolation round ==
Team	GP	W	L	GF	GA	DIF	PTS
	0	0	0	0	0	0	0
	0	0	0	0	0	0	0
	0	0	0	0	0	0	0
	0	0	0	0	0	0	0

All times are local (UTC+2).

10 August 2011; 10:00	B4	10:00	B5	Club Hannover 78, Hanover

10 August 2011; 11:30	B3	11:30	B6	Erika Fisch Stadium, Hanover

11 August 2011; 14:30	B5	14:30	B6	Erika Fisch Stadium, Hanover

11 August 2011; 19:00	B4	19:00	B3	Erika Fisch Stadium, Hanover

12 August 2011; 10:00	B6	10:00	B4	Club Hannover 78, Hanover

12 August 2011; 13:00	B5	13:00	B3	Club Hannover 78, Hanover

== Championship round ==
Quarterfinals
A1	United States	13
B2	Scotland	1
A4	Japan	12
A5	England	20
A2	Australia	20
B1	Wales	6
A3	Canada	20
A6	Haudenosaunee	5

Semifinals
United States	19
England	5
Australia	14
Canada	10

Finals
United States	14
Australia	11
Third place
England	5
Canada	14

All times are local (UTC+2).

=== Quarter-finals ===
10 August 2011; 13:00	A4	13:00	A5	Club Hannover 78, Hanover

10 August 2011; 15:00	A1	15:00	B2	Erika Fisch Stadium, Hanover

10 August 2011; 17:00	A3	17:00	A6	Club Hannover 78, Hanover

10 August 2011; 19:00	A2	19:00	B1	Erika Fisch Stadium, Hanover

=== Consolation semi-finals ===
11 August 2011; 12:00	Loser QF1	12:00	Loser QF4	Club Hannover 78, Hanover

11 August 2011; 16:30	Loser QF2	16:30	Loser QF3	Club Hannover 78, Hanover

=== Semi-finals ===
12 August 2011; 12:30	Winner QF1	12:30	Winner QF4	Erika Fisch Stadium, Hanover

12 August 2011; 15:30	United States	19-5	England	Erika Fisch Stadium, Hanover

=== 7th place playoff ===
12 August 2011; 18:30	Loser CSF1	18:30	Loser CSF2	Erika Fisch Stadium, Hanover

=== 5th place playoff ===
13 August 2011; 09:30	Winner CSF1	09:30	Winner CSF2	Erika Fisch Stadium, Hanover

=== Bronze medal game ===
13 August 2011; 12:00	England	5–14	Canada	Erika Fisch Stadium, Hanover

=== Gold medal game ===
13 August 2011; 15:30	United States	14–11	Australia	Erika Fisch Stadium, Hanover

== Ranking and statistics ==
=== Final standings ===
The final standings of the tournament according to the FIL:

Gold medal	United States
Silver medal	Australia
Bronze medal	Canada
4	England
5	Wales
6	Scotland
7	Japan
8	Iroquois
9	Czech Republic
10	Germany
11	New Zealand
12	Netherlands

=== All-World Team ===
Position	Player name	Country
A	Cortney Fortunato	United States
A	Erin McMunn	United States
A	Danielle Mollison	Australia
M	Darcy Justice Allen	Australia
M	Taylor Landry	Canada
M	Kaylin Morisette	Canada
M	Mikaela Rix	United States
M	Taylor Trimble	United States
D	Stephanie McNamara	Australia
D	Caleigh Sindall	United States
D	Ruby Smith	England
G	Katie Donohue	Canada
