= 2024 World Lacrosse Women's U20 Championship =

International women's lacrosse tournament

Tournament details
- Host country: Hong Kong, China
- Venue: 1 (in 1 host city)
- Dates: August 15–24
- Teams: 20

Final positions
- Champions: United States (6th title)
- Runners-up: Canada
- Third place: Japan
- Fourth place: Australia

Awards
- MVP: (United States) Emma LoPinto

The 2024 World Lacrosse Women's U20 Championship was the 8th FIL World Lacrosse Women's U20 Championship, an international field lacrosse tournament that is held every four years and is sponsored by the Federation of International Lacrosse. It took place from August 15–24, 2024 in Hong Kong, China.

The United States won the sixth titles, after defeating Canada 23–6 in final.

== Preliminary round ==
=== Pool A ===
Rank	Team	GP	W	L	GF	GA	DIF	PTS	Advanced to
1	United States	4	4	0	124	7	+117	4	Quarterfinals
2	Puerto Rico	4	3	1	58	51	+7	3	Quarterfinals
3	China	4	2	2	49	63	-14	2	
4	Israel	4	1	3	34	75	-41	1	
5	Germany	4	0	4	20	59	-69	0	

=== Pool B ===
Rank	Team	GP	W	L	GF	GA	DIF	PTS	Advanced to
1	Canada	4	4	0	85	6	+79	4	Quarterfinals
2	Wales	4	3	1	47	41	+6	3	Quarterfinals
3	Haudenosaunee	4	2	2	53	42	+11	2	
4	Chinese Taipei	4	1	3	32	75	-43	1	
5	South Korea	4	0	4	26	79	-53	0	

=== Pool C ===
Rank	Team	GP	W	L	GF	GA	DIF	PTS	Advanced to
1	Australia	4	4	0	74	22	+52	4	Quarterfinals
2	Italy	4	3	1	45	53	-8	3	Quarterfinals
3	Mexico	4	2	2	49	54	-5	2	
4	New Zealand	4	1	3	42	57	-15	1	
5	Scotland	4	0	4	36	60	-24	0	

=== Pool D ===
Rank	Team	GP	W	L	GF	GA	DIF	PTS	Advanced to
1	Japan	4	3	1	61	24	+37	3	Quarterfinals
2	England	4	3	1	68	24	+44	3	Quarterfinals
3	Ireland	4	3	1	61	31	+30	3	
4	Hong Kong	4	1	3	21	57	-36	1	
5	Jamaica	4	0	4	10	85	-75	0	

== Quarterfinals round ==
Team 1	Score	Team 2
Australia	11–5	Wales
United States	31–6	Puerto Rico
Japan	12–6	England
Canada	25–2	Italy

== Championship round ==
Semifinals
1	United States	33
4	Australia	1
3	Canada	17
2	Japan	2

Finals
United States	23
Canada	6
Third place
Australia	5
Japan	14

== Final standings ==
Rank	Team
1st place, gold medalist(s)	United States
2nd place, silver medalist(s)	Canada
3rd place, bronze medalist(s)	Japan
4	Australia
5	Puerto Rico
6	England
7	Wales
8	Italy
9	China
10	Ireland
11	Iroquois
12	Mexico
13	Israel
14	Chinese Taipei
15	New Zealand
16	Hong Kong
17	Scotland
18	South Korea
19	Germany
20	Jamaica
