= 2022 World Lacrosse Men's U-21 Championship =

International men's lacrosse tournament

Tournament details
- Host country: Ireland
- Venue(s): University of Limerick, Limerick
- Dates: August 10–20
- Teams: 23

Final positions
- Champions: United States (9th title)
- Runners-up: Canada
- Third place: Haudenosaunee
- Fourth place: Australia

Tournament statistics
- Scoring leader(s): (Netherlands) Christian Della Rocco

Awards
- MVP: (United States) CJ Kirst

The 2022 World Lacrosse Men's U-21 Championship was the ninth edition of the international junior men's field lacrosse tournament for national teams organized by the Federation of International Lacrosse (FIL) held at University of Limerick in Limerick, Ireland from August 10 to August 20. This competition was broadcast worldwide including United States, Canada, Europe, Latin America, Caribbean, Middle East, Africa, and Oceania. This competition also ran alongside the Lacrosse World Festival which held from 16 to 19 August. The United States won the championship with nine titles, after beating Canada 12–10 at the final.

This competition was planned to be held in 2020 as an under-19 tournament, but was postponed to 2021 as an under-20 tournament due to COVID-19 pandemic, and then was postponed once again to 2022 as an under-21 tournament.

== Format ==
Pool play will determine seeding for the playoff brackets. The top four teams from Pool A go directly to the quarterfinals. The fifth-place team from Pool A, the top three teams from Pools B and C and the best fourth-place finisher from those pools will play play-in matches to decide four teams to join the quarterfinals. The four losers of the quarterfinals and the four losers of the play-in games play championship consolation matches in a knock-out format.

In the Platinum play-ins, the second-ranked team in Pool D (D2) plays with E2 (Game 49) where the winner goes to the Platinum semifinal. Similarly, E4 plays with D4 (Game 48), D3 with E5 (Game 46), and D5 with E3 (Game 45). The three winners play with B4/C4, E1, and D1, respectively (Games 52, 55, and 58) where the winners go to the Platinum semifinal (13th to 16th). The loser of D2 vs. E2 faces the loser of D3 vs. E5 (Game 57), and the loser of E3 vs. D5 faces the loser of E4 vs. D4 (Game 54).

The losers of Games 55 and 58 play a consolation game (Game 60) where the loser of this game plays a consolation game with the loser of Game 52 (Game 71). The losers of the Games 54 and 57 play a placement game where the loser becomes the 23rd-ranked team, while the winner faces the loser of the Game 60 to decide the 21st-ranked team.

The winner of the Games 60, 54, and 57, and the loser of the Game 52 play a knock-out tournament to decide 17th to 20th ranked teams.

== Pool play ==
=== Group A ===
Pos	Team	Pld	W	L	GF	GA	GD	Qualification	(United States)	(Canada)	(Australia)	(Haudenosaunee)	(England)
1	United States	4	4	0	54	12	+42	Advance to quarterfinals	—	7–5	17–2	13–2	17–3
2	Canada	4	3	1	50	17	+33	Advance to quarterfinals		—	18–3	14–6	13–1
3	Australia	4	2	2	26	45	−19	Advance to quarterfinals			—	13–7	8–3
4	Haudenosaunee	4	1	3	29	43	−14	Advance to quarterfinals				—	14–3
5	England	4	0	4	10	52	−42	Advance to Championship Play-in					—

Source: 2022 World Lacrosse Men's U-21 Championship

=== Group B ===
Pos	Team	Pld	W	L	GF	GA	GD	Qualification	(Japan)	(Puerto Rico)	(Czech Republic)	(Israel)
1	Japan	4	4	0	32	14	+18	Advance to Championship Play-in	—	10–9	12–2	10–3
2	Puerto Rico	4	3	1	32	19	+13	Advance to Championship Play-in		—	12–6	11–3
3	Czech Republic	4	2	2	19	28	−9	Advance to Championship Play-in			—	11–4
4	Israel	4	1	3	10	32	−22	Advance to Championship Play-in				—

Source: 2022 World Lacrosse Men's U-21 Championship
- Note: Israel had a better record than Latvia so they advanced to the Championship Play-in.

=== Group C ===
Pos	Team	Pld	W	L	GF	GA	GD	Qualification	(Republic of Ireland)	(Germany)	(Jamaica)	(Latvia)
1	Ireland	3	3	0	41	11	+30	Advance to Championship Play-in	—	12–5	9–5	20–1
2	Germany	3	2	1	25	20	+5	Advance to Championship Play-in		—	7–6	13–2
3	Jamaica	3	1	2	25	16	+9	Advance to Championship Play-in			—	14–0
4	Latvia	3	0	3	3	47	−44	Advance to Platinum Quarterfinal				—

Source: 2022 World Lacrosse Men's U-21 Championship

=== Group D ===
Pos	Team	Pld	W	L	GF	GA	GD	Qualification	(Wales)	(China)	(Poland)	(Kenya)	(Chinese Taipei)
1	Wales	4	4	0	35	14	+21	Advance to Platinum quarterfinals	—	10–6	12–4	1–0	12–4
2	China	4	3	1	37	20	+17	Advance to Platinum Play-in		—	9–8	12–1	10–1
3	Poland	4	2	2	30	23	+7	Advance to Platinum Play-in			—	17–2	1–0
4	Kenya	4	1	3	4	30	−26	Advance to Platinum Play-in				—	1–0
5	Chinese Taipei	4	0	4	5	24	−19	Advance to Platinum Play-in					—

Source: 2022 World Lacrosse Men's U-21 Championship

=== Group E ===
Pos	Team	Pld	W	L	GF	GA	GD	Qualification	(Hong Kong)	(Netherlands)	(Sweden)	(South Korea)	(Uganda)
1	Hong Kong	4	4	0	42	17	+25	Advance to Platinum quarterfinals	—	11–5	10–4	11–4	10–4
2	Netherlands	4	3	1	38	33	+5	Advance to Platinum Play-in		—	10–9	11–8	12–5
3	Sweden	4	2	2	34	32	+2	Advance to Platinum Play-in			—	12–6	9–6
4	South Korea	4	1	3	29	42	−13	Advance to Platinum Play-in				—	11–8
5	Uganda	4	0	4	23	42	−19	Advance to Platinum Play-in					—

Source: 2022 World Lacrosse Men's U-21 Championship

== Platinum ==
=== Play-ins ===
Play-ins
Team 1	Score	Team 2
Poland	13–3	Uganda
South Korea	11–4	Kenya

=== Knock-outs ===
13th–20th place
1	Latvia	6
8	South Korea	7
4	China	11
5	Netherlands	13
2	Hong Kong	7
7	Poland	6
3	Wales	9
6	Sweden	13

13th–16th place
South Korea	8
Netherlands	13
Hong Kong	6
Sweden	3

13th–14th place
Netherlands	12
Hong Kong	7

== Championship ==
=== Play-ins ===
Team 1	Score	Team 2
Japan	10–8	Jamaica
Ireland	9–4	Czech Republic
England	10–2	Israel
Puerto Rico	17–5	Germany

=== Quarterfinals ===
Team 1	Score	Team 2
Australia	8–6	Japan
Canada	17–7	Ireland
Haudenosaunee	7–5	England
United States	21–3	Puerto Rico

=== Knock-outs ===
Semifinals
2	Canada	19
3	Australia	1
1	United States	10
4	Haudenosaunee	2

Finals
Canada	10
United States	12
Third place
Australia	6
Haudenosaunee	10

== Final standings ==
Rank	Team	Gr	Pld	W	L	GF	GA	GD
1st place, gold medalist(s)	United States	A	7	7	0	97	27	+70
2nd place, silver medalist(s)	Canada	A	7	5	2	90	45	+45
3rd place, bronze medalist(s)	Haudenosaunee	A	8	5	3	94	84	+10
4	Australia	A	8	3	5	68	94	-26
5	Japan	B	8	4	4	65	87	-22
6	England	A	7	5	2	96	52	+44
7	Ireland	C	7	5	2	84	37	+47
8	Puerto Rico	B	8	5	3	87	63	+24
9	Jamaica	C	7	6	1	89	44	+45
10	Israel	B	7	5	2	70	51	+19
11	Czech Republic	B	8	1	7	53	116	-63
12	Germany	C	8	4	4	88	75	+13
13	Netherlands	E	8	7	1	90	51	+39
14	Hong Kong	E	8	6	2	79	54	+25
15	Sweden	E	7	4	3	77	58	+19
16	South Korea	E						
17	China	D						
18	Wales	D						
19	Latvia	C						
20	Kenya	D						
21	Poland	D						
22	Uganda	E						
23	Chinese Taipei	D						

Ref

== Honours ==
=== All-world team ===
- Most Valuable Player: CJ Kirst, United States
- Most Outstanding Attacker: Ross Scott, Canada
- Most Outstanding Midfielder: CJ Kirst, United States
- Most Outstanding Defender: Kenny Brower, United States
- Most Outstanding Goalkeeper: Liam Entenmann, United States
- Graham Bundy, Jr., M, United States
- Owen Hiltz, A, Canada
- Graydon Hogg, M, Canada
- Brennan O’Neill, A, United States
- Levi Verch, D, Canada
- Jake Piseno, D, Haudenosaunee

=== President's team ===
The President's Team consists of the top 10 athletes outside of the Pool A teams, as selected by the awards panel.

- Ronen Abramovich, Israel
- Joshua Balcarcel, Puerto Rico
- Dante Bowen, Jamaica
- Tin Chiu Lo, China
- Christian Della Rocco, Netherlands
- Aaron Eastwood, Wales
- Conor Foley, Ireland
- Damon Hsu, China
- Jonas Hunter, Sweden
- Shaun Ito, Japan

Ref
