= 2025 World Lacrosse Men's U-20 Championship =

International men's lacrosse tournament

Tournament details
- Host country: South Korea
- Venue(s): Seogwipo, Jeju Island
- Dates: August 15–24
- Teams: 20

Final positions
- Champions: Canada (1st title)
- Runners-up: United States
- Third place: Australia
- Fourth place: Haudenosaunee

Tournament statistics
- Scoring leader(s): (Puerto Rico) Nick Testa

Awards
- MVP: (Canada) Grayson Manning

The 2025 World Lacrosse Men's U20 Championship was the tenth edition of the international junior men's field lacrosse tournament for national teams organized by the Federation of International Lacrosse (FIL) held in Seogwipo on Jeju Island, South Korea from August 15 to 24. Due to the challenges in obtaining travel visas, Ghana has been withdrawn but the pool play matches will be recorded as forfeit wins for the opposing teams, and modifications have been made to the placement schedule to account for the change.

== Preliminary round ==
=== Pool A ===
Rank	Team	GP	W	L	GF	GA	DIF	PTS	Advanced to
1	United States	3	3	0	39	10	+29	3	Quarterfinals
2	Canada	3	2	1	32	19	+13	2	Quarterfinals
3	Australia	3	1	2	20	45	-25	1	Quarterfinals
4	Haudenosaunee	3	0	3	25	42	-17	0	Quarterfinals

=== Pool B ===
Rank	Team	GP	W	L	GF	GA	DIF	PTS	Advanced to
1	Japan	2	2	0	36	6	+30	2	Quarterfinals
2	Netherlands	2	1	1	29	32	-3	1	
3	Hong Kong	2	0	2	15	42	-27	0	
	Ghana	0	0	0	0	0	0	0	Withdrawn

=== Pool C ===
Rank	Team	GP	W	L	GF	GA	DIF	PTS	Advanced to
1	England	3	3	0	41	18	+23	3	Quarterfinals
2	Jamaica	3	2	1	46	27	+19	2	Quarterfinals
3	South Korea	3	1	2	21	31	-10	1	
4	New Zealand	3	0	3	13	45	-32	0	

=== Pool D ===
Rank	Team	GP	W	L	GF	GA	DIF	PTS	Advanced to
1	Ireland	3	3	0	29	5	+24	3	
2	Mexico	3	2	1	29	13	+16	2	
3	Israel	3	1	2	11	28	-17	1	
4	China	3	0	3	11	34	-23	0	

=== Pool E ===
Rank	Team	GP	W	L	GF	GA	DIF	PTS	Advanced to
1	Puerto Rico	3	3	0	76	6	+70	3	Quarterfinals
2	Germany	3	2	1	38	34	+4	2	
3	Chinese Taipei	3	1	2	22	51	-29	1	
4	Kenya	3	0	3	16	61	-45	0	

== Play-in round ==
Team 1	Score	Team 2
Japan	13-2	Germany
Ireland (Republic of Ireland)	7-10	Jamaica
Puerto Rico	26–9	Netherlands
England	7-6	Mexico

== Quarterfinals round ==
Team 1	Score	Team 2
Haudenosaunee (Iroquois)	13–12	Puerto Rico
Australia	11–7	Japan
Canada	21–1	Jamaica
United States	26–0	England

== Championship round ==
Semifinals
Canada	13
Australia	5
United States	19
Haudenosaunee	5

Finals
Canada	6
United States	5
Third place
Australia	13
Haudenosaunee	7

== Final standings ==
Rank	Team
1st place, gold medalist(s)	Canada
2nd place, silver medalist(s)	United States
3rd place, bronze medalist(s)	Australia
4	Haudenosaunee
5	Japan
6	Puerto Rico
7	England
8	Jamaica
9	Ireland
10	Mexico
11	Netherlands
12	Germany
13	Israel
14	South Korea
15	New Zealand
16	China
17	Hong Kong
18	Chinese Taipei
19	Kenya
WD	Ghana

== Awards ==
=== All World Team ===
==== Attack ====
- Max Frattaroli, (Canada)
- Jared Maznik, (Canada)
- Jack Speidell, (United States)

==== Midfield ====
- Reece DiCicco, (Canada)
- Colin Kurdyla, (United States)
- Luke Robinson, (Canada)

==== Defense ====
- Quintan Kilrain, (United States)
- Luke Michalik, (Australia)
- Parker Sorenson, (Canada)

==== Goalkeeper ====
- Grayson Manning, (Canada)

==== Most Valuable Player ====
- Grayson Manning, (Canada)
