= Confederação Brasileira de Lacrosse =

Sports governing body in Brazil

- Sport: Lacrosse
- Jurisdiction: National
- Abbreviation: CLB
- Founded: 2022
- Affiliation: World Lacrosse
- Affiliation date: 2023
- Regional affiliation: PALA
- Headquarters: Santarém, Pará, Brazil
- President: Manolo Aquino
- Coach: Cristina Vélez

Official website
- brasillacrosse.com
- (Brazil)

The Confederação Brasileira de Lacrosse (CLB. lit. 'Brazilian Lacrosse Confederation'), or Brasil Lacrosse, is the governing body for the sport of lacrosse in Brazil

== History ==
Lutheran University of Brazil academic director and then-coordinator of the Physical Education course, Manolo Aquino was tasked by World Lacrosse to promote lacrosse in his university in Santarém, Pará in 2022. Cristina Vélez and Sérgio Madrigal, former players for Spain and Colombia, also helped promote the sport. The Confederação Brasileira de Lacrosse was then established with Aquino as its president. The CLB has scouted members of the Brazilian diaspora in the United States who already has experience in the sport to start its national team program.

The CLB became a member of World Lacrosse in May 2023. November the same year, Brazil made its debut in men's lacrosse with its sixes team at the 2023 PALA Sixes Cup in Kingston, Jamaica. Velez was head coach.

The CLB was admitted as a member of the Brazilian Olympic Committee in 9 September 2025.

Brazil's women's sixes team debuted at the 2025 PALA Sixes Cup in Humacao, Puerto Rico and finished fourth place. The men's team ended in fifth place.
