= 2008 Men's U-19 World Lacrosse Championship =

International men's lacrosse tournament

2008 Men's U–19 World Lacrosse Championship

Tournament details
- Host country: Canada
- Venue(s): Percy Perry Stadium, Coquitlam, British Columbia
- Dates: July 3–12
- Teams: 12

Final positions
- Champions: United States (6th title)
- Runners-up: Canada
- Third place: (Haudenosaunee) Iroquois

Awards
- MVP: Adam Jones

The 2008 Men's U–19 World Lacrosse Championship (U–19) was held at Percy Perry Stadium in Coquitlam, British Columbia from July 3 to July 12. The event was sponsored by the International Lacrosse Federation. This international field lacrosse tournament is held every four years, and teams are composed of players that are under the age of nineteen.

This was the last major event to be sponsored by the ILF. In August 2008, the ILF merged with the former governing body for international women's lacrosse, the International Federation of Women's Lacrosse Associations, to form the Federation of International Lacrosse (FIL). Future U–19 championships will be sponsored by FIL.

The United States won the gold medal, the silver medal winners were Canada and the bronze medal went to the Iroquois Nationals.

== Teams ==
The 2008 tournament saw twelve nations competing in the championship. Teams were split into two divisions: the elite "Blue Division" and the "Red Division" consisting of nations where lacrosse is still developing. The tournament consisted of round robin play within a team's division, where each team played every team in its division once. Round robin play established seedings for the following series of single elimination play-in games to compete in the semi-final round.

The Blue Division was composed of the following six teams: the United States had won each of the ILF's Under-19 World Lacrosse Championship tournaments since its inception in 1988; Canada led by head coach Gary Gait; Iroquois Nationals, the Nationals are the only First Nations/Native American team to compete in international competition; the up-and-coming England team; Australia, who won the bronze medal in 2003; and Japan, who moved up to the Blue Division after going undefeated in the Red Division in 2003.

The Red Division included three nations making their first appearance in an Under-19 World Lacrosse Championship tournament: Bermuda, Finland, and Scotland. Wales and South Korea made their second appearances in the Under-19 World Lacrosse Championship. Germany also participated, but was granted a waiver by the ILF to field a team consisting of Under-21 year olds.

== Round Robin results ==
Earned Automatic Semifinal berth
Qualified for Play-in Round

Blue Division
| # | Team | W | L | Points | WPct. | GF | GA | Assists | Pens | PIM | PPG |
| 1 | United States | 5 | 0 | 10 | 1.00 | 108 | 41 | 27 | 32 | 24.5 | 9 |
| 2 | Canada | 4 | 1 | 8 | .800 | 107 | 45 | 13 | 34 | 27.5 | 12 |
| 3 | Iroquois Nationals | 3 | 2 | 6 | .600 | 92 | 74 | 11 | 39 | 36.5 | 15 |
| 4 | England | 2 | 3 | 4 | .400 | 63 | 87 | 7 | 44 | 34.5 | 9 |
| 5 | Australia | 1 | 4 | 2 | .200 | 62 | 81 | 1 | 46 | 35.5 | 14 |
| 6 | Japan | 0 | 5 | 0 | .000 | 23 | 127 | 3 | 22 | 15 | 2 |

Red Division
| # | Team | W | L | Points | WPct. | GF | GA | Assists | Pens | PIM | PPG |
| 1 | Germany | 5 | 0 | 10 | 1.00 | 67 | 25 | 29 | 34 | 25 | 6 |
| 2 | Scotland | 3 | 2 | 6 | .600 | 55 | 36 | 13 | 38 | 31 | 2 |
| 3 | Wales | 3 | 2 | 6 | .600 | 46 | 31 | 8 | 65 | 54 | 2 |
| 4 | Bermuda | 3 | 2 | 6 | .600 | 40 | 42 | 5 | 51 | 38.5 | 4 |
| 5 | South Korea | 1 | 4 | 2 | .200 | 27 | 61 | 3 | 50 | 40 | 2 |
| 6 | Finland | 0 | 5 | 0 | .000 | 18 | 58 | 1 | 34 | 28 | 4 |
WPct. = Winning Percentage, GF = Goals For, GA = Goals Against, P.I.M. = Penalty Minutes, PPG= Points per Game

The round robin portion of the tournament determined seeding for the semi-finals and the placing games. The top two teams in the Blue Division were awarded automatic semi-final berths, while the third and fourth place teams from the Blue Division met with the first and second place teams from the Red Division in two semi-final "play-in games".

Two teams went undefeated in their divisions. In the Blue Division, the United States defeated all five opponents in their division to gain the top seed in the semifinals. In the Red Division, Germany won its five round robin games. Prior to this tournament, Germany had never won an international U-19 contest.

In the Blue Division there were a number of highly contested games. Canada defeated the Iroquois Nationals in a close game 15–12. England defeated Australia in an overtime game 12–11.

The United States earned one of the automatic semi-final berths by winning the division, while Canada earned the second spot based on its 4–1 record. The remaining two semi-finals spots were earned by two play-in games.

The "play-in games" featured the top-ranked Red Division Germany team facing up against Team England. The English defeated Germany 16–2. The Iroquois Nationals met Team Scotland, and were victorious with a final score of 28–2. The Iroquois Nationals advanced to the semifinals.

== Semi-finals ==
The July 10 semifinals saw the United States face England, and the Iroquois Nationals face Team Canada. The United States defeated England 25–5, extending their all-time Under-19 tournament record to 35-0. Team Canada defeated the Iroquois Nationals 23–12 on the play of attacker Mark Cockerton, son of Hall of Famer Stan Cockerton, who scored five goals in the contest.

== Finals ==
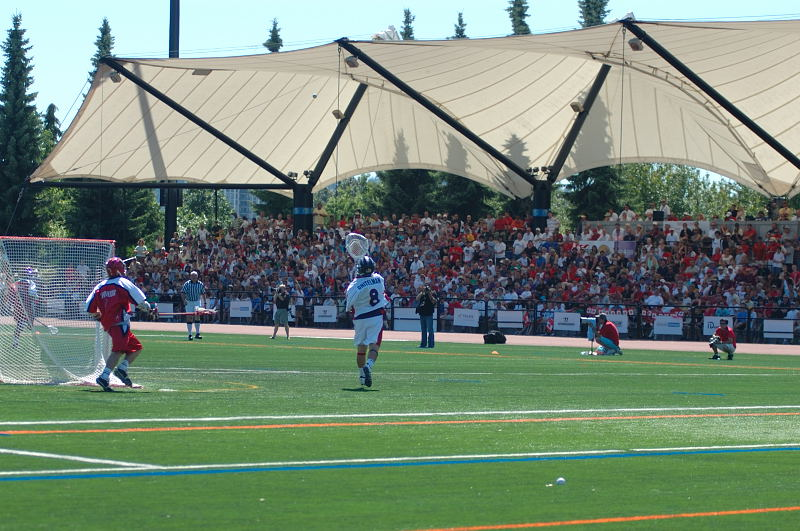
Final game at Percy Perry Stadium

| | 1st Qtr | 2nd Qtr | 3rd Qtr | 4th Qtr | Final |
| USA | 7 | 3 | 4 | 5 | 19 |
| CAN | 3 | 4 | 4 | 1 | 12 |

The finals took place on July 12, 2008, the United States defeated Canada 19–12. It was the United States' sixth gold medal, and their third consecutive finals victory over Team Canada. The United States was led by the play of goalkeeper Adam Ghitelman and three goals by captain Craig Dowd.

In the bronze medal game, Iroquois Nationals defeated England.

== Final standings ==
| Rank | Team |
|---|---|
| 1st place, gold medalist(s) | United States |
| 2nd place, silver medalist(s) | Canada |
| 3rd place, bronze medalist(s) | Iroquois |
| 4 | England |

== All tournament awards ==
| Award | Winner | Team |
|---|---|---|
| Most Valuable Player | Adam Jones | Canada |
| Top Defenseman | Peter Fallon | United States |
| Top Midfielder | Adam Jones | Canada |
| Top Attacker | Craig Dowd | United States |
| Top Goaltender | Adam Ghitelman | United States |

== See also ==
- World Lacrosse Championship
