= Percy Perry Stadium =

Multi-purpose fully lit stadium in Coquitlam, British Columbia, Canada

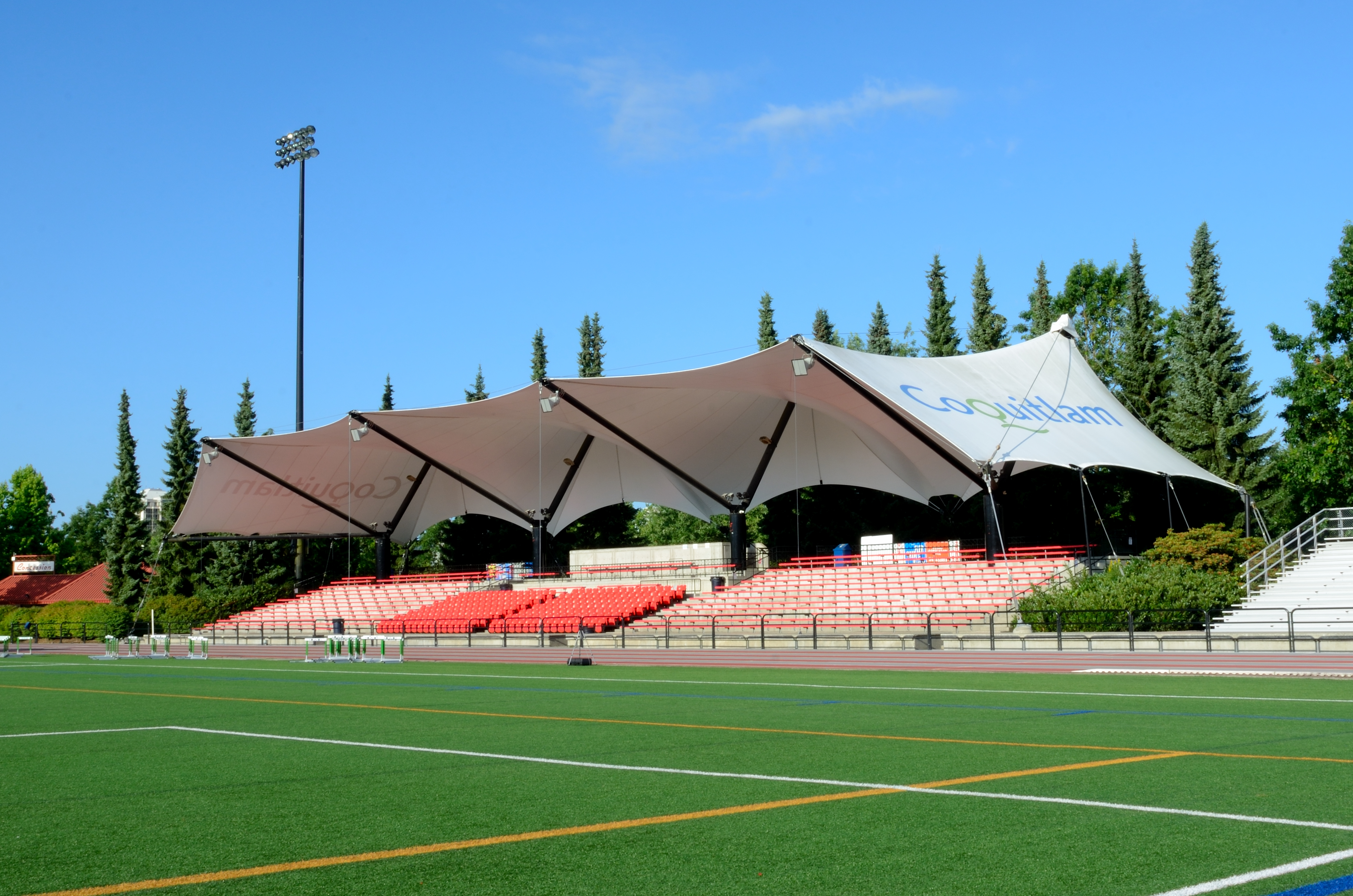
- Interactive map of Percy Perry Stadium
- Former names: Town Centre Stadium
- Location: Town Centre Park
- Owner: City of Coquitlam
- Capacity: 1,482
- Surface: Natural Grass (1991-2006); FieldTurf (2007-); Rubberized 400m track
- Public transit: Lafarge Lake–Douglas

Construction
- Opened: 1991
- Renovated: 2007-2008

Tenants
- CMF Evolution FC (League1 BC, 2025-present); Khalsa Sporting Club (PCSL, 2007, 2009-present); CMFSC Xtreme (PCSL, 2003-2006); Whitecaps FC Reserves (PCSL, 2005-2006); Tri-City Bulldogs (CJFL, 1991-2004); Coquitlam Cheetahs track and field club

Percy Perry Stadium is a multi-purpose, fully lit stadium in Coquitlam, British Columbia. It was built for the 1991 B.C. Summer Games, as part of the district's 100th anniversary, and has featured events with crowds of over 4,000 spectators. Prior to 2006, the stadium had been named "Town Centre Stadium", but was renamed to "Percy Perry Stadium" in honour of long-standing track and field coach Percy Perry who died in 2005.

Percy Perry Stadium features a 400m polyflex synthetic rubberized track surface, as well as separate areas for long jump/triple jump, high jump, pole vault, discus, hammer, shot put and javelin.

== Teams ==
Percy Perry Stadium is home to the League1 BC's Coquitlam Metro-Ford Evolution FC, the Pacific Coast Soccer League's Khalsa Sporting Club, the Coquitlam Cheetahs track and field club, and previously served as the home of the CMFSC Xtreme, Whitecaps FC Reserves and the defunct Tri-City Bulldogs of the Canadian Junior Football League.

== Events ==
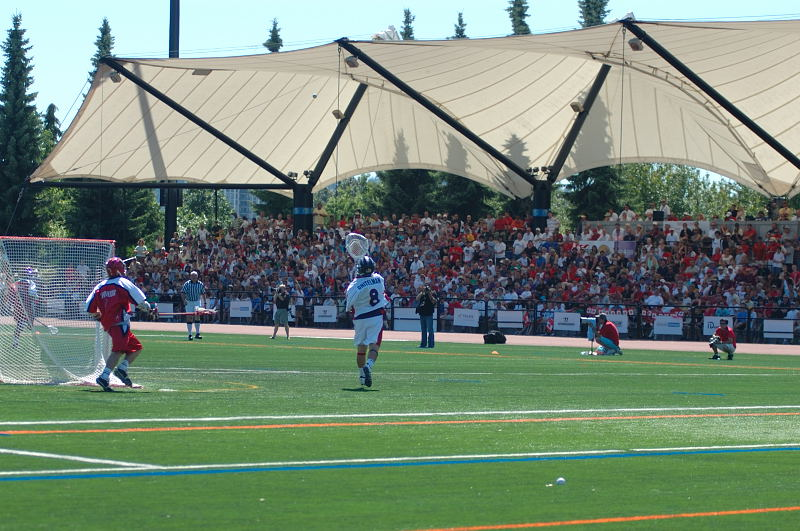
2008 Men's U-19 World Lacrosse Championships at Percy Perry Stadium

In addition to the B.C. Summer Games, the facility also hosted the 1993 Canadian Track and Field Championships.

The BC Highland Games are held on the last Saturday of every June at the stadium.

As a warmup to the 2007 FIFA U-20 World Cup, a friendly match between Scotland and Canada had been scheduled for Swangard Stadium in neighbouring Burnaby on March 23. Weeks of heavy rain had turned the natural turf at Swangard into muck, and at the last moment the game was shifted to Percy Perry Stadium and its new FieldTurf surface. This was the stadium's second-ever international match (the other was a U-23 match in 1996). In spite of poor weather and just a day's notice of the venue change, a sellout crowd of 4,265 watched Canada upset Scotland 3-1.

Percy Perry Stadium hosted both the 2008 and 2016 World Lacrosse Men's U-19 Championships.

Since 2013, western Canada's largest Functional Fitness Competition, The CanWest Games, have been held every July at the stadium.

== Renovations ==
Beginning in the spring of 2007, the city of Coquitlam undertook a $10 million expansion to the facilities in and around Percy Perry Stadium, in order to expand the number of events and tournaments that could be held at the facility throughout the year. The natural grass inside the track was replaced with FieldTurf, two new fully lit FieldTurf fields were constructed north of the stadium, and the older Astroturf at Cunnings Field to the west has also been replaced with FieldTurf.

Following the 2007-2008 renovations that saw the removal of bleacher seating, permanent seating capacity was reduced to 1,482.
