= PALA Sixes Cup =

- Sport: Lacrosse sixes
- Founded: 2021
- No. of teams: M: 6 W: 5
- Countries: Member nations of the PALA
- Most recent champions: M: Haudenosaunee (1st title); W: Haudenosaunee (3rd title)
- Most titles: M: 3 nations (1 title each); W: Haudenosaunee (3 titles)

The PALA Sixes Cup is a lacrosse sixes tournament for national teams in the Americas sanctioned by the Pan-American Lacrosse Association.

== History ==
The Pan-American Lacrosse Association (PALA) first organized a lacrosse sixes tournament for both men's and women's national teams in 2021 called the PALA Sixes Cup. The inaugural edition in 2021 was held in Auburndale, Florida.

It was meant to be a "marquee tournament" of PALA to be held annually. However the next two editions were held after every two years.

== Results ==
=== Men ===
#	Year	Host	Champions	Runners-up	Third place	Fourth place	Ref
1	2021	(United States); Auburndale	Panama	Puerto Rico	Peru	Colombia Blue	
2	2023	(Jamaica); Kingston	Puerto Rico	Mexico	Dominican Republic	Panama	
3	2025	(Puerto Rico); Humacao	Haudenosaunee	Puerto Rico	Chile	Mexico	

=== Women ===
#	Year	Host	Champions	Runners-up	Third place	Fourth place	Ref
1	2021	(United States); Auburndale	Iroquios	Puerto Rico	Argentina	Colombia	
2	2023	(Jamaica); Kingston	Haudenosaunee	Puerto Rico	Argentina	Peru	
3	2025	(Puerto Rico); Humacao	Haudenosaunee	Puerto Rico	Argentina	Brazil	

== Results ==
=== Men's ===
Team	2021 (United States) (7)	2023 (Jamaica) (8)	2023 (Puerto Rico) (6)	Years
Brazil		7th	5th	2
Colombia	4th / 6th			1
Argentina	3rd			1
Chile			3rd	1
Dominican Republic		3rd		1
Haudenosaunee			1st	1
Jamaica		5th / 6th		1
Mexico		2nd	4th	2
Panama	1st	4th		2
Peru	7th			1
Puerto Rico	2nd	1st	2nd	3
U.S. Virgin Islands	5th	6th		2

=== Women's ===
Team	2021 (United States) (4)	2023 (Jamaica) (7)	2023 (Puerto Rico) (5)	Years
Brazil			4th	1
Colombia	4th			1
Argentina	3rd	3rd	3rd	3
Haudenosaunee	1st	1st	1st	3
Jamaica		7th		1
Mexico		5th	5th	2
Peru		4th		1
Puerto Rico	2nd	2nd	2nd	3
U.S. Virgin Islands		6th		1
