= 2016 Men's U-19 World Lacrosse Championship =

International men's lacrosse tournament

2016 Men's U–19 World Lacrosse Championship

Tournament details
- Host country: Canada
- Venue(s): Percy Perry Stadium, Coquitlam, British Columbia
- Dates: July 7–16
- Teams: 14

Final positions
- Champions: United States (8th title)
- Runners-up: Canada
- Third place: Iroquois
- Fourth place: Australia

Awards
- MVP: (United States) Jared Bernhardt

The 2016 Men's U-19 World Lacrosse Championship (U–19) was held at Percy Perry Stadium in Coquitlam, British Columbia from July 3 to July 12. The event was sponsored by the International Lacrosse Federation. This international field lacrosse tournament is held every four years, and teams are composed of players that are under the age of nineteen.

The United States won the eighth titles, after defeated Canada 13–12 in final.

== Championship knock-outs ==
Semifinals
1	United States	23
4	Australia	1
3	Canada	14
2	Haudenosaunee	11

Finals
United States	13
Canada	12
Third place
Haudenosaunee	20
Australia	8

== Final standings ==
Rank	Team
1st place, gold medalist(s)	United States
2nd place, silver medalist(s)	Canada
3rd place, bronze medalist(s)	Iroquois
4	Australia
5	England
6	Israel
7	Ireland
8	Germany
9	China
10	Scotland
11	Hong Kong
12	South Korea
13	Mexico
14	Taiwan
