= United States men's national junior lacrosse team =

- Association: US Lacrosse
- Head coach: Shawn Nadelen
- Website: www.usalacrosse.com/us-u20-men
Medal record
U20 World Championship
| Gold medal – first place | 1988 Adelaide |
| Gold medal – first place | 1992 Long Island |
| Gold medal – first place | 1996 Tokyo |
| Gold medal – first place | 1999 Adelaide |
| Gold medal – first place | 2003 Baltimore |
| Gold medal – first place | 2008 Coquitlam |
| Gold medal – first place | 2012 Turku |
| Gold medal – first place | 2016 Coquitlam |
| Gold medal – first place | 2022 Limerick |
| Silver medal – second place | 2025 Jeju |

The United States men's national junior lacrosse team is the junior national under-20 team for United States. As of 2022, the team has won all champions of the World Lacrosse Men's U20 Championship in every edition, totally nine times.

== Competition achievements ==
=== U20 World Championship ===
World Lacrosse Men's U20 Championship record
| Year | Result | Matches | Wins | Draws | Losses | PF | PA | Coach |
|---|---|---|---|---|---|---|---|---|
| (Australia) 1988 | Champions | | | | | | | |
| (United States) 1992 | Champions | | | | | | | |
| (Japan) 1996 | Champions | | | | | | | |
| (Australia) 1999 | Champions | | | | | | | |
| (United States) 2003 | Champions | | | | | | | |
| (Canada) 2008 | Champions | 7 | 7 | 0 | 0 | 152 | 58 | |
| (Finland) 2012 | Champions | | | | | | | |
| (Canada) 2016 | Champions | 6 | 6 | 0 | 0 | 97 | 31 | |
| (Republic of Ireland) 2022 | Champions | 7 | 7 | 0 | 0 | 97 | 27 | |
| (South Korea) 2025 | Runners-up | 6 | 5 | 0 | 1 | 89 | 21 | Shawn Nadelen |
| Total | 10/10 | — | | | | | | |
