= 2012 Men's U-19 World Lacrosse Championship =

International men's lacrosse tournament

2012 Men's U–19 World Lacrosse Championship

Tournament details
- Host country: Finland
- Venue(s): Turku, Finland
- Dates: July 12–21
- Teams: 12

Final positions
- Champions: United States (7th title)
- Runner-up: Canada
- Third place: Iroquois
- Fourth place: England

Awards
- MVP: (United States) Matt Kavanagh

The 2012 Men's U-19 World Lacrosse Championship (U–19) was held at in Turku, Finland from July 12 to July 21. The event was sponsored by the International Lacrosse Federation. This international field lacrosse tournament is held every four years, and teams are composed of players that are under the age of nineteen.

The United States won the seventh titles, after defeating Canada 10–8 in final.

== Championship knock-outs ==
Finals
1	United States	10
2	Canada	8
Third place
Haudenosaunee	15
England	13

== Final standings ==
Rank	Team
1st place, gold medalist(s)	United States
2nd place, silver medalist(s)	Canada
3rd place, bronze medalist(s)	Iroquois
4	England
5	Australia
6	Czech Republic
7	Germany
8	Scotland
9	Wales
10	Bermuda
11	South Korea
12	Finland
