= U.S. Virgin Islands Lacrosse Association =

Sports governing body in the United States Virgin Islands

- Sport: Lacrosse
- Jurisdiction: National
- Abbreviation: USVILA
- Founded: 2019
- Affiliation: World Lacrosse
- Affiliation date: 2020
- Regional affiliation: PALA (Americas)
- Affiliation date: 2020
- Headquarters: Christiansted
- President: Leon Hughes
- Director: Rich Carter
- Secretary: Anjali Coryat

Official website
- www.usvi-lacrosse.org
- (United States Virgin Islands)

The U.S. Virgin Islands Lacrosse Association (USVILA) is the governing body for lacrosse in the United States Virgin Islands.

== History ==
The U.S. Virgin Islands Lacrosse Association (USVILA) was established in October 2019.

USVILA became an associate member of World Lacrosse and a full member of the Pan-American Lacrosse Association (PALA) in November 2020.

It joined its first official tournament in September 2021, the PALA Sixes Cup. It's men's sixes team finished fifth, defeating one of Colombia's two teams in the final playoff game.

The U.S. Virgin Islands sent a men's field lacrosse team at the 2022 PALA Men's World Qualifier in Colombia even though the team is not eligible to qualify for the 2023 World Lacrosse Men's Championship.

The men's sixes team returned to the 2023 PALA Sixes Cup finishing sixth.
