= Jamaica men's national lacrosse team =

Men's national lacrosse team of Jamaica

Jamaica
- Association: Jamaica Lacrosse Association
- Confederation: PALA (Americas)

World Championship
- Appearances: 2 (first in 2018)
- Best result: 8th place (2023)
- Website: jamaicalacrosse.net

The Jamaica men's national lacrosse team is the national team that represents Jamaica in international lacrosse competitions. It is governed by the Jamaica Lacrosse Association.

== History ==
The Jamaica Lacrosse Association (JLA) was established in April 2013 and October the same year the JLA became a member of then-Federation of International Lacrosse (later renamed as World Lacrosse).

At the May 2017 International Lacrosse Showdown, Jamaica ended with a 5–1 win-lose record in the standings with Israel prevailing on tiebreakers over it and Hungary.

Jamaica appointed Errol Wilson as its head coach for its field lacrosse national team in July 2017, ahead of its debut at the 2018 World Lacrosse Championship in Netanya, Israel. They were almost forced to withdraw, if not for a financial assistance from the Sports Development Foundation of the government. The Jamaican team finished 13th place in its first appearance in the tournament.

Jamaica competed again at the 2023 World Championship, where it finished in eight place.

It took part at the inaugural 2026 Pan-American Men's Lacrosse Championship which was hosted at home in Kingston. They finished fourth, and qualified for the 2027 World Championship in Japan.

== Competitive record ==
=== World Lacrosse Championship ===
Year	Host	GP	W	L	GF	GA	Finish
2018	Israel	8	7	1	90	51	13th
2023	United States	7	5	2	46	52	8th
2027	Japan	Qualified					−
Total	−	15	12	3	136	103	No medal

=== Pan-American Championship ===
Year	Host	GP	W	L	GF	GA	Finish
2026	Jamaica	4	2	2	46	40	4th
Total	−	4	2	2	46	40	No medal
