= 2015 FIL Women's U-19 World Lacrosse Championship =

International women's lacrosse tournament

- 2015 FIL Rathbones Women's U-19 World Lacrosse Championship official logo

Tournament details
- Host country: Scotland
- Venue(s): 1 (in 1 host city)
- Dates: 23 July – 1 August 2015
- Teams: 14

The 2015 FIL Rathbones Women's U-19 World Lacrosse Championship was the sixth FIL Women's Under-19 World Lacrosse Championship, an international field lacrosse tournament that is held every four years and is sponsored by the Federation of International Lacrosse. It took place from 23 July to 1 August 2015 in Edinburgh, Scotland. The games were played at the University of Edinburgh – Peffermill Playing Fields. The Canadian team won its first world championship at this event in defeating the United States in the final.

== Preliminary round ==
Fifteen nations were set to participate in the championship; however the Haudenosaunee Nationals team withdrew on the eve of the tournament, due to issues regarding the acceptance of their national passport by UK authorities. The fourteen participating teams were placed in three groups. After playing a round-robin, all five teams from Pool A advanced to the championship round along with the top three seeded teams from Pools B and C. The remaining six teams in Pools B and C competed in the Platinum Division for placings nine through fourteen.

=== Pool A ===
Team	GP	W	L	GF	GA	DIF	PTS	Advanced to
United States	5	5	0	90	19	71	10	Quarter-finals
Canada	5	4	1	61	36	25	8	Quarter-finals
Australia	5	3	2	77	47	30	6	Quarter-finals
England	5	2	3	54	49	5	4	Quarter-finals
Wales	5	1	4	19	79	−60	2	Quarter-finals

=== Pool B ===
Team	GP	W	L	GF	GA	DIF	PTS	Advanced to
Scotland	5	4	1	76	44	32	8	Quarter-finals
Germany	5	3	2	66	44	22	6	Platinum
Finland	5	2	3	47	61	−14	4	Platinum
Czech Republic	5	2	3	41	78	−37	4	Platinum
Colombia	5	1	4	29	79	−50	2	Platinum

=== Pool C ===
Team	GP	W	L	GF	GA	DIF	PTS	Advanced to
Japan	5	4	1	71	23	48	8	Quarter-finals
New Zealand	5	3	2	74	27	47	6	Quarter-finals
South Korea	5	1	4	16	74	−58	2	Platinum
Israel	5	0	5	3	73	−70	0	Platinum
Haudenosaunee	Withdrawn							

=== Pool Play ===
All times are local (UTC+1).

23 July 2015; 12:00	Czech Republic	2–28	Australia	Peffermill Playing Fields, University of Edinburgh

23 July 2015; 12:30	Finland	11–7	Colombia	Peffermill Playing Fields, University of Edinburgh

23 July 2015; 14:30	South Korea	3 – 2 (OT)	Israel	Peffermill Playing Fields, University of Edinburgh

23 July 2015; 15:00	Wales	2–19	England	Peffermill Playing Fields, University of Edinburgh

23 July 2015; 17:00	Japan	9–8	New Zealand	Peffermill Playing Fields, University of Edinburgh

23 July 2015; 17:30	United States	15–9	Canada	Peffermill Playing Fields, University of Edinburgh

23 July 2015; 19:30	Scotland	16–9	Germany	Peffermill Playing Fields, University of Edinburgh

24 July 2015	Israel	0–19	New Zealand	Peffermill Playing Fields, University of Edinburgh

24 July 2015; 12:00	South Korea	10–12	Colombia	Peffermill Playing Fields, University of Edinburgh

24 July 2015; 12:30	England	10–5	Japan	Peffermill Playing Fields, University of Edinburgh

24 July 2015; 14:30	Germany	20–4	Finland	Peffermill Playing Fields, University of Edinburgh

24 July 2015; 17:00	Czech Republic	8–19	Scotland	Peffermill Playing Fields, University of Edinburgh

24 July 2015; 17:30	Wales	0–19	United States	Peffermill Playing Fields, University of Edinburgh

24 July 2015; 19:30	Australia	10 – 11 (2OT)	Canada	Peffermill Playing Fields, University of Edinburgh

25 July 2015; 9:30	Japan	20–2	South Korea	Peffermill Playing Fields, University of Edinburgh

25 July 2015; 14:30	Czech Republic	6–13	Germany	Peffermill Playing Fields, University of Edinburgh

25 July 2015; 15:00	Canada	9 – 8 (3OT)	England	Peffermill Playing Fields, University of Edinburgh

25 July 2015; 17:00	Wales	11–10	New Zealand	Peffermill Playing Fields, University of Edinburgh

25 July 2015; 17:30	Colombia	2–18	Scotland	Peffermill Playing Fields, University of Edinburgh

25 July 2015; 19:30	United States	19–6	Australia	Peffermill Playing Fields, University of Edinburgh

25 July 2015	Finland	12 – 0 (forfeit)	Israel	Peffermill Playing Fields, University of Edinburgh

26 July 2015; 12:00	Germany	18–1	Colombia	Peffermill Playing Fields, University of Edinburgh

26 July 2015; 12:30	Finland	11–13	Czech Republic	Peffermill Playing Fields, University of Edinburgh

26 July 2015; 14:30	Canada	12–3	Wales	Peffermill Playing Fields, University of Edinburgh

26 July 2015; 17:00	Scotland	2–16	Japan	Peffermill Playing Fields, University of Edinburgh

26 July 2015; 17:30	New Zealand	20–1	South Korea	Peffermill Playing Fields, University of Edinburgh

26 July 2015; 19:30	England	13 – 14 (5OT)	Australia	Peffermill Playing Fields, University of Edinburgh

26 July 2015	Israel	0–18	United States	Peffermill Playing Fields, University of Edinburgh

28 July 2015; 9:30	Colombia	7–22	Czech Republic	Peffermill Playing Fields, University of Edinburgh

28 July 2015; 14:30	New Zealand	17–6	Germany	Peffermill Playing Fields, University of Edinburgh

28 July 2015; 15:00	Australia	19–3	Wales	Peffermill Playing Fields, University of Edinburgh

28 July 2015; 17:00	Scotland	21–9	Finland	Peffermill Playing Fields, University of Edinburgh

28 July 2015; 17:30	Canada	20–0	South Korea	Peffermill Playing Fields, University of Edinburgh

28 July 2015; 19:30	England	4–19	United States	Peffermill Playing Fields, University of Edinburgh

28 July 2015	Japan	21–1	Israel	Peffermill Playing Fields, University of Edinburgh

== Bracket Play ==
=== Platinum Division ===
All times are local (UTC+2).

29 July 2015; 12:00	Israel	8–15	Colombia	Peffermill Playing Fields, University of Edinburgh

29 July 2015; 17:00	Germany	7–5	Finland	Peffermill Playing Fields, University of Edinburgh

29 July 2015; 19:30	Czech Republic	18–5	South Korea	Peffermill Playing Fields, University of Edinburgh

30 July 2015; 10:00	Germany	24–1	Israel	Peffermill Playing Fields, University of Edinburgh

30 July 2015; 12:30	Colombia	4–15	Czech Republic	Peffermill Playing Fields, University of Edinburgh

30 July 2015; 17:30	South Korea	9–12	Finland	Peffermill Playing Fields, University of Edinburgh

=== Championship Bracket ===
Quarter finals
Pool A 2nd	Canada	19
#7 Seed (Pools B&C)	Scotland	0
Pool A 3rd	Australia	13
#6 Seed (Pools B&C)	Japan	4
Pool A 1st	United States	18
#8 Seed (Pools B&C)	New Zealand	1
Pool A 4th	England	12
Pool A 5th	Wales	4

Semi finals
QF1W	Canada	17
QF2W	Australia	3
QF3W	United States	20
QF4W	England	4

Gold medal game
SF1W	Canada
SF2W	United States
Bronze medal game
SF1L	Australia
SF2L	England

=== Quarter finals ===
29 July 2015; 9:30	Canada	19–0	Scotland	Peffermill Playing Fields, University of Edinburgh

29 July 2015; 12:00	Australia	13–4	Japan	Peffermill Playing Fields, University of Edinburgh

29 July 2015; 14:30	United States	18–1	New Zealand	Peffermill Playing Fields, University of Edinburgh

29 July 2015; 17:00	England	12–4	Wales	Peffermill Playing Fields, University of Edinburgh

=== Consolation semi finals ===
30 July 2015; 11:00	Wales	5–8	New Zealand	Peffermill Playing Fields, University of Edinburgh

30 July 2015; 15:00	Japan	11–2	Scotland	Peffermill Playing Fields, University of Edinburgh

=== Semi finals ===
30 July 2015; 16:00	United States	20–4	England	Peffermill Playing Fields, University of Edinburgh

30 July 2015; 19:00	Canada	17–3	Australia	Peffermill Playing Fields, University of Edinburgh

== Final Placement and Medal Games ==
=== 13th place playoff ===
31 July 2015; 9:30	South Korea	11–8; 7–3, 4–5	Israel	Peffermill Playing Fields, University of Edinburgh

Game reference

=== 11th place playoff ===
31 July 2015; 12:00	Finland	11–8; 5–4, 6–4	Colombia	Peffermill Playing Fields, University of Edinburgh

Game reference

=== 9th place playoff ===
31 July 2015; 10:00	Germany	9–5; 4–4, 5–1	Czech Republic	Peffermill Playing Fields, University of Edinburgh

Game reference

=== 7th place playoff ===
31 July 2015; 14:30	Wales	14–12; 7–8, 7–4	Scotland	Peffermill Playing Fields, University of Edinburgh

Game reference

=== 5th place playoff ===
1 August 2015; 09:30	Japan	8–10 (OT); 6–3, 2–5, 0–2	New Zealand	Peffermill Playing Fields, University of Edinburgh

Game reference

=== Bronze medal game ===
1 August 2015; 12:15	Australia	9–10; 3–6, 6–4	England	Peffermill Playing Fields, University of Edinburgh

Game reference

=== Gold medal game ===
1 August 2015; 15:00	United States	8–9; 5–4, 4–4	Canada	Peffermill Playing Fields, University of Edinburgh

Game reference

== Ranking and statistics ==
=== Final standings ===
The final standings of the tournament according to the FIL:

Gold medal	Canada
Silver medal	United States
Bronze medal	England
4	Australia
5	New Zealand
6	Japan
7	Wales
8	Scotland
9	Germany
10	Czech Republic
11	Finland
12	Colombia
13	South Korea
14	Israel
