= Coquitlam Cheetahs =

Track and field club based in Coquitlam, British Columbia, Canada

The Coquitlam Cheetahs are a non-profit Canadian track and field club based in Coquitlam, British Columbia. Their home track is Percy Perry Stadium, named after former Cheetahs' coach Percy Perry.

The Cheetahs were founded in 1962, and the team is a member organization of the Canadian Track and Field Association and B.C. Athletics Association.

Percy Perry took over as head coach of Cheetahs in 1989 when it was on the verge of folding. Perry was an advisor for the construction of Town Centre Stadium (now called Percy Perry Stadium), which the Cheetahs moved to after the 1991 BC Summer Games. Since then, the club stabilized its operations, and has produced five Canadian Olympians, including Perry's daughter, Tara Self.

Following Percy Perry's death in 2005, Tara Self assumed the role of head coach.

== Sponsored events ==
- Jesse Bent Memorial Invitational (held in June every year.) The Jesse Bent Memorial Invitational was last held in June 2022.
