= Pan-American Lacrosse Association =

Regional governing body for lacrosse

- Sport: Lacrosse
- Jurisdiction: International
- Membership: 22
- Abbreviation: PALA
- Founded: 2018; 8 years ago
- Affiliation: World Lacrosse
- Headquarters: Auburndale, Florida, U.S.
- President: Ann Kitt Carpenetti

Official website
- panamericanlacrosse.org

The Pan-American Lacrosse Association (PALA) is the governing body for the sport of lacrosse in the Americas.

== History ==
The Pan-American Lacrosse Association (PALA) was established in 2018 to cover the member federations of World Lacrosse in the Americas. In 2019, PALA entered in a partnership with the Visit Central Florida Sports which enabled the organization to set its headquarters in Auburndale, Florida.

== Tournaments ==
PALA is mandated to hold lacrosse tournaments for its member associations. This includes the PALA Sixes Cup. This also includes the qualifiers for World Lacrosse tournaments such as the Men's and Women's Championship.

The Pan-American Women's Lacrosse Championship was held in 2025, while the 2026 Pan-American Men’s Lacrosse Championship in Jamaica is scheduled to be held.

== Members ==
Country	Association
Argentina	Argentina Lacrosse
Barbados	Barbados Lacrosse
Bermuda	Bermuda Lacrosse Association
Brazil	Confederação Brasileira de Lacrosse
Canada	Lacrosse Canada
Chile	Chile Lacrosse
Colombia	Colombia Lacrosse
Costa Rica	Costa Rica Lacrosse
Dominican Republic	Dominican Republic Lacrosse
Ecuador	Ecuador Lacrosse
Guatemala	Guatemala Lacrosse
Haiti	Haiti Lacrosse
Haudenosaunee	Haudenosaunee Nationals Lacrosse Organization
Jamaica	Jamaica Lacrosse
Mexico	Mexico Lacrosse
Nicaragua	Nicaragua Lacrosse
Panama	Panama Lacrosse Association
Peru	Peru Lacrosse Association
Puerto Rico	Puerto Rico Lacrosse
Uruguay	Uruguay Lacrosse Association
United States	USA Lacrosse
United States Virgin Islands	U.S. Virgin Islands Lacrosse Association

Source: PALA

== Presidents ==
President	Term
(United States) Ann Kitt Carpenetti	2022–present
