= World Lacrosse Men's U20 Championship =

International youth men's lacrosse championship

World Lacrosse Men's U-20 Championship
- Current season, competition or edition: 2025 World Lacrosse Men's U-20 Championship
- Sport: Men's lacrosse
- Founded: 1988; 38 years ago
- Organising body: World Lacrosse
- Countries: World Lacrosse member nations
- Most recent champions: Canada (1st title)
- Most titles: United States (9 titles)
- Related competitions: World Lacrosse Championship; World Lacrosse Women's U20 Championship
- Website: Official website

The World Lacrosse Men's U20 Championship, formerly known as the World Lacrosse Men's U19 Championship, are held every four years to award world championships for the under-20 age group in men's lacrosse. The tournaments are sanctioned by World Lacrosse.

== History ==
These championships were first held for men in 1988. The 2008 men's championship was held in July 2008 in Coquitlam, British Columbia, Canada and was won by the United States. The 2012 men's tournament was held in Turku, Finland, with the United States winning the title, defeating Canada 10–8, despite a pair of pool-play losses to Canada and the Iroquois Nationals (now Haudenosaunee Nationals). The Iroquois Nationals finished third after an 18–1 win over England. The 2016 championship for men was held July 7–16, 2016, again in Coquitlam, British Columbia, just outside Vancouver. The U.S. won its eighth title, coming back from being down 6–0 to eventually defeat Canada 13–12.

The 2020 competition was planned to be held as an under-19 tournament, but was postponed to 2021 as an under-20 tournament due to COVID-19 pandemic, and then was postponed once again to 2022 as an under-21 tournament. The next tournament is planned to be held as an under-20 event in 2025.

== Results ==
Year	Host	Champions	Score	Runner-up
1988	Adelaide, Australia	United States	12–5	Canada
1992	Long Island, United States	United States	24–11	Australia
1996	Tokyo, Japan	United States	13–8	Australia
1999	Adelaide, Australia	United States	14–7	Canada
2003	Baltimore, United States	United States	19–10	Canada
2008	Coquitlam, Canada	United States	19–12	Canada
2012	Turku, Finland	United States	10–8	Canada
2016	Coquitlam, Canada	United States	13–12	Canada
2022	(Republic of Ireland); Limerick, Ireland	United States	12–10	Canada
2025	Seoguipo, South Korea	Canada	6–5	United States

== Medal table ==
Rank	Nation	Gold	Silver	Bronze	Total
1	United States	9	1	0	10
2	Canada	1	7	2	10
3	Australia	0	2	3	5
4	Haudenosaunee	0	0	4	4
5	England	0	0	1	1
Totals (5 entries)		10	10	10	30

== Past results ==
Team	1988 (Australia) (4)	1992 (United States) (6)	1996 (Japan) (5)	1999 (Australia) (6)	2003 (United States) (9)	2008 (Canada) (12)	2012 (Finland) (12)	2016 (Canada) (14)	2022 (Republic of Ireland) (23)	2025 (South Korea) (20)
Australia	3rd	2nd	2nd	4th	3rd	5th	5th	4th	4th	3rd
Bermuda						10th	10th			
Canada	2nd	3rd	3rd	2nd	2nd	2nd	2nd	2nd	2nd	1st
China								9th	17th	16th
Czech Republic							6th		11th	
England	4th	4th		3rd	4th	4th	4th	5th	6th	7th
Finland						12th	12th			
Germany					9th	6th	7th	8th	12th	12th
Ghana										WD
Haudenosaunee		5th	4th	5th	5th	3rd	3rd	3rd	3rd	4th
Hong Kong								11th	14th	17th
Ireland								7th	7th	9th
Israel								6th	10th	13th
Jamaica									9th	8th
Japan		6th	5th	6th	6th	7th			5th	5th
Kenya									20th	19th
Latvia									19th	
Mexico								13th		10th
Netherlands									13th	11th
New Zealand										15th
Poland									21st	
Puerto Rico									8th	6th
Scotland						8th	8th	10th		
South Korea					7th	11th	11th	12th	16th	14th
Sweden									15th	
Chinese Taipei								14th	23rd	18th
Uganda									22nd	
United States	1st	1st	1st	1st	1st	1st	1st	1st	1st	2nd
Wales					8th	9th	9th		18th	

== See also ==
- Men's World Lacrosse Championship
