= Copper Cup =

American college lacrosse rivalry

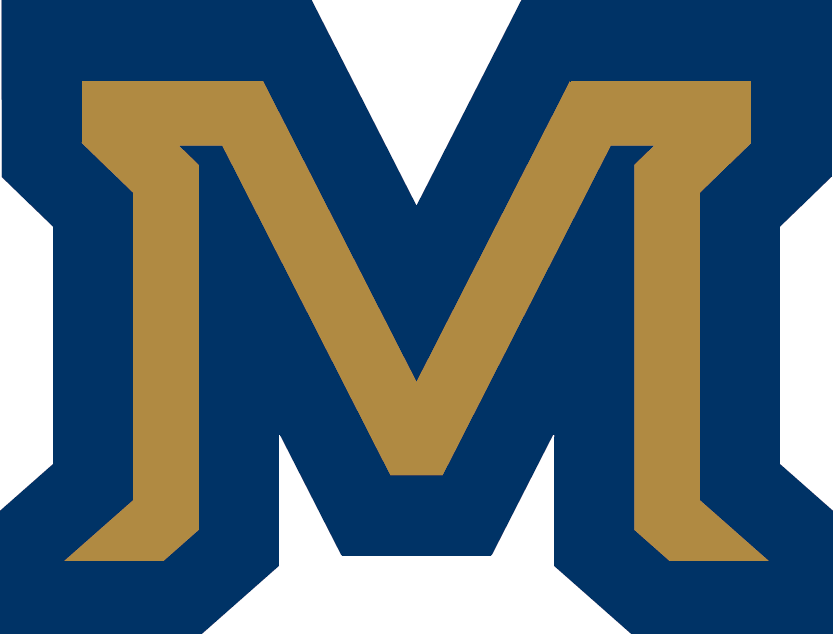
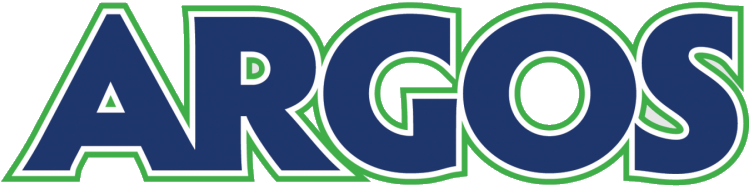
- Montana Grizzlies Montana State Bobcats Providence Argonauts
- Sport: Field Lacrosse
- Type: Collegiate
- First meeting: April 7, 2006; Montana, 13–8
- Latest meeting: March 27, 2026; Montana State, 13–11
- Trophy: Copper Cup

Statistics
- Total meetings: 17
- All-time series: Montana State, 10–9
- Trophy series: Montana State, 8–3
- Current win streak: Montana State, 7 wins 2018–present

The Copper Cup is an annual Men's Collegiate Lacrosse Association (MCLA)-level college lacrosse rivalry game between the University of Montana Grizzlies and the Montana State University Bobcats, and was formerly a round-robin tournament with the University of Providence Argonauts.

Montana was the first to receive the cup following their victory in 2014. Since then, the cup has changed hands a total three times. Montana State leads both theall-time series at 10–9 (.526), as well as the cup series 8–3 (.727). The overall series is notable for having seven games decided by a single goal.

Unlike the football rivalry between Montana and Montana State, the two teams do not compete in the same conference, with Montana competing in the Pacific Northwest Collegiate Lacrosse League (PNCLL), and Montana State competing in the Rocky Mountain Lacrosse Conference (RMLC). Providence originally played in the National Association of Intercollegiate Athletics (NAIA) Frontier League, but after a single season they would move to the MCLA, playing in the PNCLL.

== History ==
The series began in 2006, which was only Montana State's third season as a team, where they lost to Montana 13–8. The early years of the rivalry were informal, with the hosting team alternating every year.

In 2014, the teams decided to formalize the rivalry and create a local event for the game. Being another team from Montana, the newly formed team from the University of Providence was invited to play in the Copper Cup, which was then restructured into a round-robin tournament format. In addition to the tournament, several high school matches between local high schools were hosted. The Copper Cup trophy was created and donated by local blacksmithing company Copper Mountain Creations in Missoula, Montana, it's worth an estimated $2,000, and the winner of the game possesses the cup for one year, in addition to having their team's name engraved onto it.

The tournament operated in this manner for 5 years from 2014 to 2018, when Providence folded its lacrosse program. Throughout their time as a team, Providence only managed to secure a single win in the Copper Cup tournament, a 9–8 victory against Montana State in 2017. Their victory led to the only 3-way tie of the tournament's history, with the cup ultimately being awarded to Montana based on score differential.

Since 2019, the Copper Cup has returned to a single-game format, rather than a tournament-style format.

== Accomplishments by Team ==
As of the conclusion of the 2024 Season:

| Team | Montana | Montana State | Providence |
|---|---|---|---|
| National titles | 1 | 1 | 0 |
| Conference titles | 6 | 3 | 0 |
| All-Americans | 32 | 45 | 1 |

== Results ==
| Season | Location | Winner | Montana-Montana State Score | | |
|---|---|---|---|---|---|
| 2006 | Bozeman, MT | Montana | Montana, 13-8 | | |
| 2007 | Missoula, MT | Montana State | Montana State, 11-10^{OT} | | |
| 2008 | Bozeman, MT | Montana | Montana, 17-16 | | |
| 2009 | Missoula, MT | Montana | Montana, 15-14 | | |
| 2011 | Missoula, MT | Montana | Montana, 18-3 | | |
| 2012 | Bozeman, MT | Montana State | Montana State, 10-6 | | |
| 2013 | Missoula, MT | Montana | Montana, 12-7 | | |
| 2014 | Bozeman, MT | Montana | Montana, 7-6^{OT} | Montana-Providence Score | Montana State-Providence Score |
| 2014 | Missoula, MT | Montana | Montana, 8-7^{OT} | Montana, 20-5 | Montana State, 19-6 |
| 2015 | Bozeman, MT | Montana | Montana, 13-12^{OT} | Montana, 21-6 | Montana State, 21-6 |
| 2016 | Great Falls, MT | Montana State | Montana State, 13-9 | Montana, 18-6 | Montana State, 18-5 |
| 2017 | Missoula, MT | Montana (Awarded based on score differential) | Montana State, 15-12 | Montana, 14-5 | Providence, 9-8 |
| 2018 | Bozeman, MT | Montana State | Montana State, 11-9 | Montana, 10-5 | Montana State, 21-6 |
| 2019 | Missoula, MT | Montana State | Montana State, 14-9 | | |
| 2022 | Bozeman, MT | Montana State | Montana State, 8-6 | | |
| 2023 | Missoula, MT | Montana State | Montana State, 10-6 | | |
| 2024 | Bozeman, MT | Montana State | Montana State, 16-2 | | |
| 2025 | Missoula, MT | Montana State | Montana State, 13-11 | | |
| 2026 | Missoula, MT | Montana State | Montana State, 11-8 | | |
| Season | | Montana State leads Total series at 10-9 Montana State leads cup series 8-3 | Montana-Montana State Score | Montana-Providence Score | Montana State-Providence Score |
