= Western Collegiate Lacrosse League =

Conference in the Men's Collegiate Lacrosse Association

- Formerly: California Collegiate Lacrosse Association (1980–1983)
- Association: Men's Collegiate Lacrosse Association
- Founded: 1980, 46 years ago
- President: Mike Gillespie
- Sports fielded: College lacrosse
- No. of teams: 14
- Most recent champions: Division 1: UC Berkeley (8th Title); Division 2: UC Davis (5th Title) (2025)
- Most titles: Division 1: UC Santa Barbara (11 Titles); Division 2: San Diego, Saint Mary’s & UC Davis(Tied at 5 Titles)
- Website: http://mcla.us/WCLL/

The Western Collegiate Lacrosse League (WCLL) is a conference that participates in the Men's Collegiate Lacrosse Association (MCLA). The WCLL operates in California and Nevada, and is split into two divisions, Division I and Division II. The conference is governed by an executive board and the teams that win the conference's divisional playoffs receive automatic bids to the MCLA National Tournament.

== History ==
=== California Lacrosse Association Era (1959–1979) ===
The roots of the WCLL go back to 1959 when the California Lacrosse Association (CLA) was created. This was a hybrid organization that included both college and men's club teams in Southern California. Similarly, the teams in Northern California participated in the Northern California Lacrosse Association (NCLA). The founding members of the CLA included Claremont, Los Angeles Lacrosse Club, Orange County Lacrosse Club, San Fernando Valley Lacrosse Club, OMBAC, San Marino Lacrosse Club and others. In 1969, UCLA joined the league, followed by UCSB in 1970.

In 1976, the CLA expanded with the addition of Southern California. On occasion the CLA Champion would face the NCLA Champion at the end of the season to determine a conference or "California State Champion". UCSB captured the final state championship played under this arrangement defeating their northern counterparts in 1978. In 1979, at the urging of CLA VP and San Diego State alum Mitch Fenton, a separate organization for the collegiate teams in both the CLA and NCLA was brainstormed.

=== California Collegiate Lacrosse Association Era (1980–1982) ===
The union that would eventually become the WCLL was founded on Super Bowl Sunday, January 20, 1980, as the California Collegiate Lacrosse Association (CCLA). A select few gathered at the house of then UCLA Head Coach Mayer Davidson's house in West Los Angeles. Co-founders also included Stanford Head Coach Sam Sadtler, the Claremont Head Coach and Mitch Fenton. The original 9 members were: California, Claremont, San Diego State, Santa Clara, Southern California, Stanford, UC Davis, UCLA and UCSB. Fenton served as the first president of the association. In the inaugural championship, the UCSB Gauchos defeated the Stanford Cardinal. One year later, Whittier College joined the league. In 1982, the University of Arizona, Arizona State and Northern Arizona joined the CCLA. That same year the Stanford Cardinal took home the championship defeating UCLA at Stanford.

=== WCLL Expansion Era (1982–2008) ===
In 1983, the CCLA renamed itself the Western Collegiate Lacrosse League. That same year Cal Poly SLO joined the conference. Arizona Head Coach and WCLL co-founder Mickey-Miles Felton, who was instrumental in the addition of the Arizona schools the year before, served as the league's first president. The WCLL Championship Trophy is named in his honor.

In 1985, Loyola Marymount University was admitted to the conference. In 1987, Chico State was admitted as a full member of the conference.

In 1988, the WCLL split into A and B divisions (later I and II). That same year Chapman University and San Jose State University joined the WCLL as Division II members. In 1989, Sonoma State joined the WCLL.

In 1997, the WCLL, was one of the charter conferences in the US Lacrosse Intercollegiate Associates (USLIA). Prior to the 2000 season, Whittier College departed joining the NCAA Division III as an independent. Following the 2002 season, Division II member Cal State San Marcos left the conference. Following the 2004 season, Division II member Cal State Hayward (now Cal State East Bay) left the conference.

The addition of the University of Nevada, Reno and St. Mary's College to the WCLL Division I at the annual conference meeting in 2004 lead to a massive realignment of the conference. The 20 Division I teams were split into 4 geographic divisions (North, Central, Los Angeles and South) for the 2005 season. In 2005, the University of Nevada, Las Vegas and UC Santa Cruz joined the league, followed by Cal State Fullerton and the readmittance of San Jose State in 2006. That same year, the USLIA reorganized into the Men's Collegiate Lacrosse Association (MCLA).

=== Departure of Southern Teams (2009) ===
The league grew into the largest MCLA conferences but saw big changes in 2009. The University of California, Merced joined the league for the 2009 season but the league lost its entire Central Division, made up of Chapman, UC Santa Barbara, Claremont, Loyola Marymount, USC, and UCLA; and lost the majority of its Southern Division, including: Arizona State, San Diego State, Arizona, San Diego, UC San Diego. The WCLL also lost six of ten Division II members, including: Biola, Cal Lutheran, Cal State Fullerton, Occidental, Pepperdine, UC Irvine, and UNLV. The departing teams formed the Southwestern Lacrosse Conference (SLC).

=== Modern Era (since 2009) ===
After the departure of its southern teams, the WCLL entered a period which would see several teams join, only to cease operations shortly thereafter. This included UC Merced (2009–2012), Cal-State Monterey Bay (2013–2014), the University of San Francisco (2015–2016), and culminated in one of the league's oldest members, University of the Pacific, folding in 2017.

In 2014, Sierra Nevada College joined the conference, they would go on to win four back-to-back division II championships from 2015 to 2018. The team ultimately folded in 2022 after their school was sold to the University of Nevada at Reno, which closed all of its sports teams.

In 2020, UC Santa Barbara returned to the WCLL after 11 years (2009–2019) in the SLC.

In 2023, the WCLL expanded to include its first team from Oregon, Southern Oregon University, moving over from the Pacific Northwest Collegiate Lacrosse League (PNCLL). At the conclusion of the 2023 season, Dominican University announced that it would be departing the WCLL, joining the NCAA Division II as an independent in 2024.

== Teams ==
Institution	Location	Enrollment	Nickname	Tenure	Conference Championships
Division I
California Polytechnic State University, San Luis Obispo	San Luis Obispo, California	22,287	Mustangs	1983–present	2009, 2010, 2011, 2012, 2014, 2016, 2017, 2022
Santa Clara University	Santa Clara, California	9,015	Broncos	1980–present	
Sonoma State University	Rohnert Park, California	7,807	Seawolves	1989–present	2001, 2002, 2006
Stanford University	Palo Alto, California	17,246	Cardinal	1980–present	1982, 2013, 2015
University of California, Berkeley	Berkeley, California	45,307	Golden Bears	1980–present	1981, 1994, 1995, 1998, 2000, 2018, 2019, 2026
University of California, Santa Barbara	Santa Barbara, California	26,179	Gauchos	1980–2009, 2019–present	1980, 1983, 1984, 1987, 2003, 2004, 2005, 2007, 2023, 2024, 2025
University of Nevada, Reno	Reno, Nevada	20,718	Wolf Pack	2004–present	
Division II
California State Polytechnic University, Humboldt	Arcata, California	6,431	Hogs^{a}	1985–1999, 2010–present	
California State University, Chico	Chico, California	16,630	Wildcats	1987–present	1988, 1989, 2024
Saint Mary's College of California	Moraga, California	3,761	Gaels	1989–present	1991, 2000, 2010, 2011, 2012
San José State University	San Jose, California	35,751	Spartans	1988–1992, 2006–present	
University of California, Davis	Davis, California	40,031	Aggies	1980–present	2019, 2022, 2023, 2025, 2026
University of California, Santa Cruz	Santa Cruz, California	19,161	Banana Slugs	2005–2019, 2022–present	1993, 2009, 2013

^aDespite the official mascot of Cal Poly Humboldt being the Lumberjacks, the lacrosse team is referred to as the Hogs due to an initial lack of support from the university.

== Former members ==
Institution	Location	Team Nickname	Tenure	Reason for Departure
Arizona State University	Tempe, Arizona	Sun Devils	1982–2009	Moved to MCLA – SLC Division I
Biola University	La Mirada, California	Eagles	2001–2009	Moved to MCLA – SLC Division II
Brigham Young University	Provo, Utah	Cougars	c.1985–c.1991	Moved to MCLA – RMLC Division I
California Lutheran University	Thousand Oaks, California	Kingsmen	2005–2009	Moved to MCLA – SLC Division II
California State University, East Bay	Hayward, California	Pioneers	1997–2004	ceased operations in 2004
California State University, Fullerton	Fullerton, California	Titans	2006–2009	Moved to MCLA – SLC Division II
California State University, Monterey Bay	Seaside, California	Otters	2013–2014	ceased operations in 2014
California State University, Sacramento	Sacramento, California	Hornets	1986–1998	ceased operations in 1998
California State University, San Marcos	San Marcos, California	Cougars	2002-2002	ceased operations in 2002
Chapman University	Orange, California	Panthers	1988–2009	Moved to MCLA – SLC Division I
Claremont Colleges	Claremont, California	Cougars^{b}	1980–2009	Moved to MCLA – SLC Division I
Dominican University of California	San Rafael, California	Penguins	2015–2023	Moved to NCAA – Independent Division II
Loyola Marymount University	Los Angeles, California	Lions	1985–2009	Moved to MCLA – SLC Division I
Northern Arizona University	Flagstaff, Arizona	Lumberjacks	1982–unknown	Moved to MCLA – RMLC Division II
Occidental College	Los Angeles, California	Tigers	2006–2009	Moved to MCLA – SLC Division II
Pepperdine University	Malibu, California	Waves	unknown–2009	Moved to MCLA – SLC Division II
San Diego State University	San Diego, California	Aztecs	1980–2009	Moved to MCLA – SLC Division I
Sierra Nevada University	Incline Village, Nevada	Eagles	2014–2022	ceased operations in 2022
Southern Oregon University	Ashland, Oregon	Raiders	2023–2025	ceased operations in 2025
University of Arizona	Tucson, Arizona	Wildcats	1982–2009	Moved to MCLA – SLC Division I
University of California, Irvine	Irvine, California	Anteaters	1988–2009	Moved to MCLA – SLC Division II
University of California, Los Angeles	Los Angeles, California	Bruins	1980–2009	Moved to MCLA – SLC Division I
University of California, Merced	Merced, California	Golden Bobcats	2009–2012	ceased operations in 2012
University of California, San Diego	San Diego, California	Tritons	1988–2009	Moved to MCLA – SLC Division I
University of Nevada, Las Vegas	Las Vegas, Nevada	Rebels	2005–2009	Moved to MCLA – SLC Division I
University of the Pacific	Stockton, California	Tigers	1980–2017	ceased operations in 2017
University of San Diego	San Diego, California	Toreros	1987–2009	Moved to MCLA – SLC Division I
University of San Francisco	San Francisco, California	Dons	2015–2016	ceased operations in 2016
University of Southern California	Los Angeles, California	Trojans	1980–1986, 1991–1996, 1998–2009	Moved to MCLA – SLC Division I
Whittier College	Whittier, California	The Poets	1981–1999	Moved to NCAA – Independent Division III

^bThe Claremont Colleges team is referred to as the Cougars because the team is independent from any individual college, and instead represents the entirety of the Claremont College Consortium.

== Conference championship ==
=== Division I ===
When the conference was formed in 1980, it was determined that the top team of the Northern Division would play the top team of the Southern Division at the end of the season to determine the conference champion. This changed in 1985 when the conference championship was turned into a four team tournament among the top two teams in each division. The 2005 season introduced two new divisions to the WCLL, the Central Division and the Los Angeles Division, each of whom would send their top two teams to tournament. After many teams left in 2009, the conference dissolved all of its divisions and changed the tournament to be among the conference's top four teams. In 2019, the conference reintroduced its North Division and South Division, the champions of which would receive a bye round in a six-team tournament.

Division I Champions
Season	Conference Champion	Score	Runner-up	Citation
1980	UC Santa Barbara	16–12	Stanford	
1981	California	14–8	UC Santa Barbara	
1982	Stanford	11–8	UC Los Angeles	
1983	UC Santa Barbara	12–11	Arizona	
1984	UC Santa Barbara	10–9^{OT}	San Diego State	
1985	Whittier	18–7	Arizona	
1986	Whittier	12–11	UC Santa Barbara	
1987	UC Santa Barbara	13–8	Whittier	
1988	Whittier	18–15	Sonoma State	
1989	Whittier	16–12	Sonoma State	
1990	Arizona	6–5	UC Santa Barbara	
1991	Whittier	16–8	UC Santa Barbara	
1992	Whittier	13–9	Arizona	
1993	Whittier	14–10	California	
1994	California	14–10	UC San Diego	
1995	California	13–5	UC Santa Barbara	
1996	Whittier	17–9	Chapman	
1997	Whittier	29–10	Arizona	
1998	**California**	16–15^{OT}	Whittier	
1999	Whittier	11–8	Sonoma State	
2000	California	12–10	Sonoma State	
2001	Sonoma State	22–9	Arizona	
2002	**Sonoma State**	8–4	Stanford	
2003	UC Santa Barbara	14–9	Sonoma State	
2004	**UC Santa Barbara**	11–1	Arizona	
2005	**UC Santa Barbara**	8–7	Sonoma State	
2006	Sonoma State	7–3	Arizona	
2007	UC Santa Barbara	7–5	Arizona	
2008	Chapman	17–9	Arizona State	
2009	Cal Poly	17–9	Sonoma State	
2010	Cal Poly	13–7	California	
2011	Cal Poly	11–6	Stanford	
2012	Cal Poly	11–8	California	
2013	Stanford	8–7	Sonoma State	
2014	Cal Poly	16–5	California	
2015	Stanford	11–10^{2OT}	Cal Poly	
2016	Cal Poly	9–8	California	
2017	Cal Poly	10–8	California	
2018	California	6–4	Cal Poly	
2019	California	17–9	Santa Clara	
2020	No Championship due to COVID-19 pandemic			
2021	No Championship due to COVID-19 pandemic			
2022	Cal Poly	12–11	California	
2023	UC Santa Barbara	11–5	Cal Poly	
2024	UC Santa Barbara	13–11	California	
2025	UC Santa Barbara	13–12^{OT}	Cal Poly	
2026	California	17–15	UC Santa Barbara	

Division I Records
Team	Championships	Winning years	Runner-up	Runner-up years
UC Santa Barbara	11	1980, 1983, 1984, 1987, 2003, **2004**, **2005**, 2007, 2023, 2024, 2025	6	1981, 1986, 1990, 1991, 1995, 2026
Whittier	10	1985, 1986, 1988, 1989, 1991, 1992, 1993, 1996, 1997, 1999	2	1987, 1998
Cal Poly	8	2009, 2010, 2011, 2012, 2014, 2016, 2017, 2022	4	2015, 2018, 2023, 2025
California	8	1981, 1994, 1995, **1998**, 2000, 2018, 2019, 2026	8	1993, 2010, 2012, 2014, 2016, 2017, 2022, 2024
Sonoma State	3	2001, **2002**, 2006	8	1988, 1989, 1999, 2000, 2003, 2005, 2009, 2013
Stanford	3	1982, 2013, 2015	3	1980, 2002, 2011
Arizona	1	1990	8	1983, 1985, 1992, 1997, 2001, 2004, 2006, 2007
Chapman	1	2008	1	1996
UC Los Angeles			1	1982
San Diego State			1	1984
UC San Diego			1	1994
Arizona State			1	2008
Santa Clara			1	2019

- Note: **Bold** text denotes MCLA National Champion
- Note: Italic text denotes MCLA National Champion runner-up

=== Division II ===
Division II Champions
Season	Conference Champion	Score	Runner-up	Citation
1988	Chico State			
1989	Chico State	24–4	Humboldt State	
1990	Cal Poly			
1991	Saint Mary's			
1992	Chapman	12–4	Cal Poly	
1993	UC Santa Cruz		Arizona State	
1994	UC Irvine	6–4	Loyola Marymount	
1995	Arizona State	10–5	UC Irvine	
1996	Sacramento State	10–6	Cal Poly	
1997	Arizona State	9–4	Cal Poly	
1998	San Diego	11–3	UC San Diego	
1999	San Diego	8–7	Chico State	
2000	Saint Mary's	11–6	Claremont	
2001	Chapman	11–10	Saint Mary's	
2002	Southern California	10–6	Saint Mary's	
2003	Claremont	12–5	Saint Mary's	
2004	San Diego	11–8	Saint Mary's	
2005	**San Diego**	12–4	Claremont	
2006	**San Diego**	14–6	Claremont	
2007	UC Irvine	11–10	Pepperdine	
2008	Biola (Vacated)*	15–3	UC Santa Cruz	
2009	UC Santa Cruz	12–11	Saint Mary's	
2010	Saint Mary's	9–5	UC Santa Cruz	
2011	Saint Mary's	8–7	UC Santa Cruz	
2012	Saint Mary's	16–5	UC Santa Cruz	
2013	UC Santa Cruz	9–6	Nevada	
2014	Nevada	5–4	San José State	
2015	Sierra Nevada	14–6	Nevada	
2016	Sierra Nevada	18–3	UC Davis	
2017	Sierra Nevada	13–4	UC Davis	
2018	Sierra Nevada	7–4	UC Davis	
2019	UC Davis	11–2	Saint Mary's	
2020	No Championship due to COVID-19 pandemic			
2021	No Championship due to COVID-19 pandemic			
2022	UC Davis	10–6	UC Santa Cruz	
2023	UC Davis	8–6	Chico State	
2024	Chico State	10–7	Saint Mary's	
2025	UC Davis	21–8	San José State	
2026	UC Davis	13–7	Chico State	

*Despite winning the championship game, Biola were made to forfeit the title because they fielded ineligible players

Division II Records
Team	Championships	Winning years	Runner-up	Runner-up years
San Diego	5	1998, 1999, 2004, **2005**, **2006**		
Saint Mary's	5	1991, 2000, 2010, 2011, 2012	7	2001, 2002, 2003, 2004, 2009, 2019, 2024
UC Davis	5	2019, 2022, 2023, 2025, 2026	3	2016, 2017, 2018
Sierra Nevada	4	2015, 2016, 2017, 2018		
UC Santa Cruz	3	1993, 2009, 2013	5	2008, 2010, 2011, 2012, 2022
Chico State	3	1988, 1989, 2024	3	1999, 2023, 2026
Arizona State	2	1995, 1997	1	1993
Chapman	2	1992, 2001		
UC Irvine	2	1994, 2007	1	1995
Cal Poly	1	1990	3	1992, 1996, 1997
Sacramento State	1	1996		
Southern California	1	2002		
Claremont	1	2003	3	2000, 2005, 2006
Nevada	1	2014	2	2013, 2015
San José State			2	2014, 2025
Cal Poly Humboldt			1	1989
Loyola Marymount			1	1994
UC San Diego			1	1998
Pepperdine			1	2007
Biola		2008*		

- Note: Bold text denotes MCLA National Champion
