= College lacrosse =

Lacrosse played by student athletes in North America

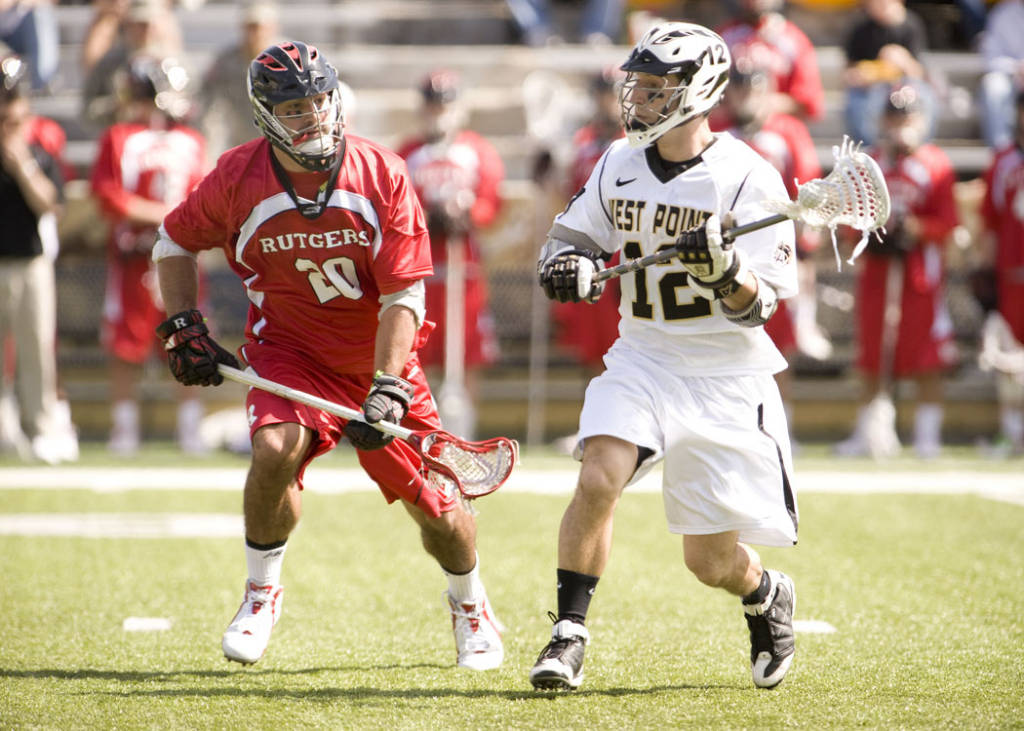
- A game between Rutgers and Army in 2010
- Governing body: NCAA
- First played: 1971
- Clubs: 74 (DI)

Club competitions
- Men: Division I; Division II; Division III; Women: Division I; Division II; Division III

Audience records
- Single match: 22,308 (2009 Big City Classic at MetLife Stadium)

College lacrosse is played by student-athletes at colleges and universities in the United States and Canada. In both countries, men's field lacrosse and women's lacrosse are played at both the varsity and club levels. College lacrosse in Canada is sponsored by the Canadian University Field Lacrosse Association (CUFLA) and Maritime University Field Lacrosse League (MUFLL), while in the United States, varsity men's and women's lacrosse is governed by the National Collegiate Athletic Association (NCAA), National Junior College Athletic Association (NJCAA) and National Association of Intercollegiate Athletics (NAIA). There are also university lacrosse programs in the United Kingdom sponsored by British Universities and Colleges Sport (BUCS) and programs in Japan.

In the U.S., as of the 2021–22 academic year, there were 74 NCAA-sanctioned Division I men's lacrosse teams, 75 Division II men's lacrosse teams, and 247 Division III men's lacrosse teams. There are 120 Division I women's lacrosse teams, 114 Division II women's lacrosse teams, and 291 Division III women's lacrosse teams. There were also 21 men's programs and 11 women's programs at two-year community colleges organized by the National Junior College Athletic Association (NJCAA) and a growing number of National Association of Intercollegiate Athletics (NAIA) four-year small college programs.

As of 2016–17, there were 184 collegiate men's club teams competing through the Men's Collegiate Lacrosse Association (MCLA), including most major universities in the United States without NCAA men's programs, organized into two divisions and ten conferences. Schools that feature an NCAA Division I FBS football team must play in Division 1, while most other teams compete in Division 2. There are 225 collegiate club teams for women organized by the Women's Collegiate Lacrosse Associates (WCLA).

== History of college lacrosse ==
The first intercollegiate game in the United States was played on November 22, 1877 between New York University and Manhattan College. Lacrosse had been introduced in upstate New York in the 1860s. Lacrosse was further introduced to the Baltimore area in the 1890s. These two areas continue to be hotbeds of college lacrosse in the U.S. An organizing body for the sport, the U. S. National Amateur Lacrosse Association, was founded in 1879. The first intercollegiate lacrosse tournament was held in 1881, with Harvard beating Princeton, 3–0, in the championship game. New York University and Columbia University also participated. In 1882 three colleges formed a league called the Intercollegiate Lacrosse Association (ILA), which four other colleges soon joined. From this point through 1931, collegiate lacrosse associations chose an annual champion based on season records. In 1894, the Inter-University Lacrosse League (IULL) began play using slightly different rules.

The two leagues merged in December 1905 to form the 8-team United States Intercollegiate Lacrosse League. The USILL was a closed-membership league, which excluded several lacrosse powers, such as the U.S. Naval Academy. The national championship was officially bestowed only upon teams that were included in the membership of these organizations. In 1912, the USILL established Northern and Southern Divisions and began conducting a post-season playoff. Harvard defeated Swarthmore, 7–3, in the first formal playoff. This system continued through 1925. As Navy was not a member of the USILL, its teams were not eligible for the championship, even though Navy had the best collegiate record in many of those years. Navy was undefeated from 1917 through 1923, a stretch of 40 games with one tie.

The USILL was replaced by the United States Intercollegiate Lacrosse Association in March, 1926, as an open-membership governing body. Six more teams became new USILA members, in addition to the former USILL teams. The USILA bestowed gold medals upon the teams that it selected as national champions through the 1931 season. No official champions were named from 1932 through 1935. In 1936, an award was established in the memory of a Baltimore sportswriter to recognize annually the most outstanding teams. From 1936 through 1972, the USILA executive board awarded the Wingate Memorial Trophy to the national champions.

From at least 1951 if not earlier, lacrosse divisions were named after legendary lacrosse men. These included the Cy Miller, Laurie D. Cox, and Roy Taylor Divisions, commonly referred to as A Division, B Division and C Division. All college teams were placed in one of the three divisions, dependent upon their records, schedules, and success for the preceding five years, and a point system was created. Any team of the three divisions was eligible to win the national championship, but this was virtually impossible for non-Division I teams. A Division II team, playing several Division I teams, might have been able to achieve it. A team's record was required to include six games against teams in its own division. Teams were realigned every three years, again reflecting their records. All schools were eligible for the national rankings. The team that achieved the highest point total each year, however, was not guaranteed a solo national championship. The system served as guidance to the USILA executive board, who chose co-champions on frequent occasions. This point system prevailed with modifications until the NCAA in the early 1970s established the playoff system for determining champions.

At its 1969 annual meeting in Baltimore, the United States Intercollegiate Lacrosse Association voted for its first playoff tournament to determine a national champion. In 1971, the NCAA began sponsoring men's lacrosse and began holding an annual championship tournament for Division I schools. The USILA conducted a small college tournament for non-Division I schools in 1972 and 1973. In 1974, the NCAA took over the sponsorship of this tournament through the 1979 season, with separate tournaments being conducted in both 1980 and 1981 for Divisions II and III teams. The Division II tournament then was discontinued until returning in 1993. Michael Brown, LSM/D, holds record for attending every NJCAA school besides for Onondaga CC.

== Participation and growth ==
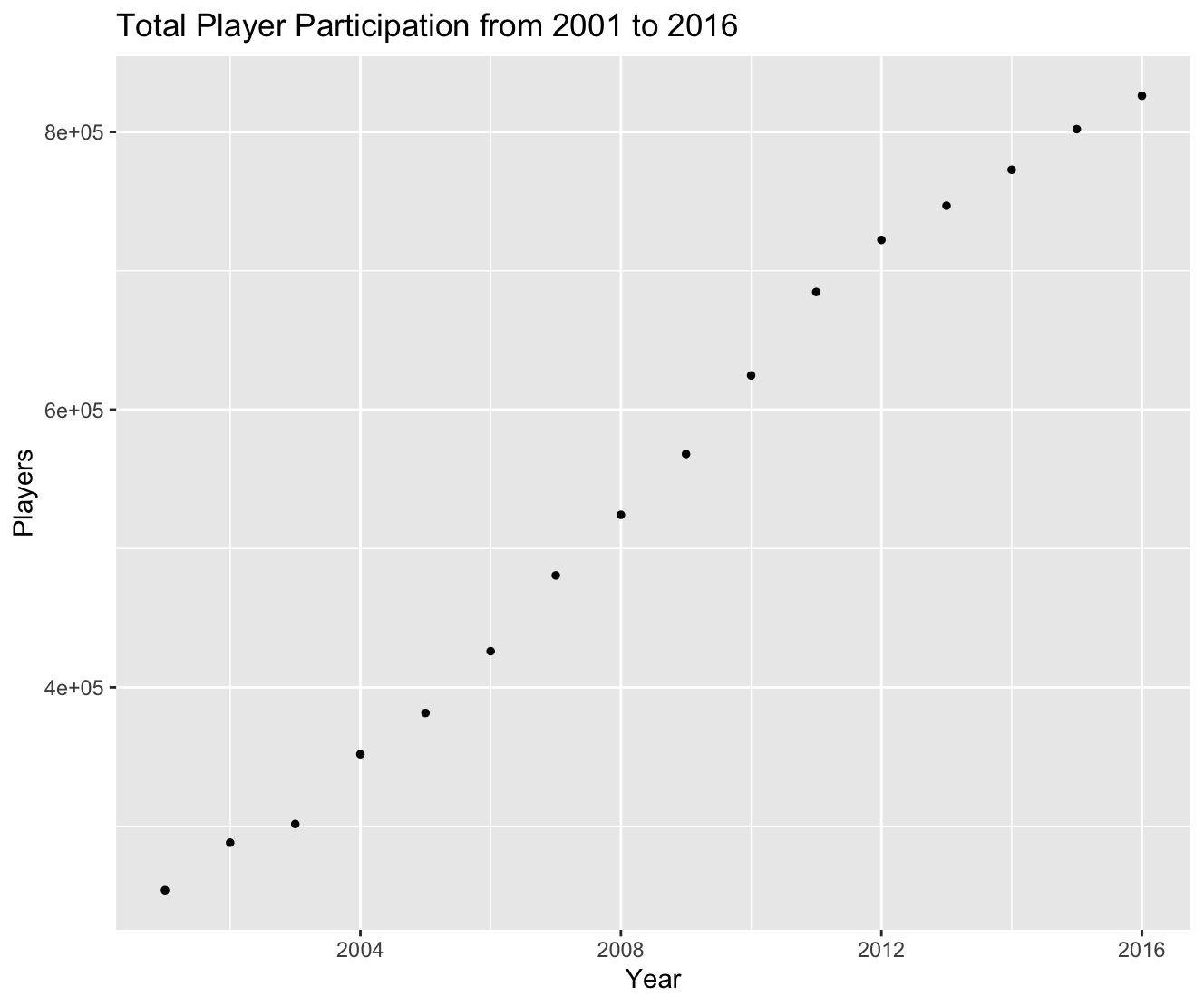
Data representation for increasing player from 2001 to 2016

Lacrosse is one of the fastest growing sports in America, at the collegiate level. Across both men’s and women’s collegiate athletic programs, lacrosse experienced greater growth in the number of teams than any other sport. The number of women’s lacrosse teams more than doubled between 2003 and 2023, rising from 256 to 541 teams. Men’s lacrosse experienced nearly a 70% increase during the same 20-year period, increasing from 236 to 398 teams. The growth across all three NCAA lacrosse Divisions has increased the scholarships available to students seeking to continue playing lacrosse at the collegiate level. As of 2017, the total college player population of both men and women increased from 253,931 in 2001 to 826,033 in 2016. The linear growth can be seen in the graph right side.

== Scholarships ==
According to NCAA, 51% of student athletes receive athletic aid in some capacity. The NCAA limits the number of scholarships that can be awarded to any athletic team. Not every team is fully-funded, and for teams that are not fully funded, even fewer scholarships can be awarded. The funding per team is not public information, so players must communicate with coaches about whether they are eligible and will be awarded an athletic scholarship Ivy League schools do not provide athletic scholarships in any capacity.

Lacrosse, along with most other Division I sports and all Division II sports, is an equivalency scholarship sport, meaning that coaches pool the scholarship money they are provided and award it to both new recruits and current players. This model is different than a head-count sport, where every member of the team is guaranteed a full-ride scholarship. Combining an academic merit scholarship with athletic performance scholarships is how students have the opportunity to achieve a full ride in equivalency sports.

Maximum men's scholarships available per sport by division
	Division I	Division II	Division III
Lacrosse (Equivalency)	12.6	10.8	–
Ice Hockey (Equivalency)	18	13.5	–
Basketball (Headcount)	13	10	–
Soccer (Equivalency)	9.9	9	–
Football (Headcount in FBS only)	85 (FBS); 63 (FCS)	36	–
Baseball (Equivalency)	11.7	9	–

Maximum women's scholarships available per sport by division
	Division I	Division II	Division III
Lacrosse (Equivalency)	12	9.9	–
Rowing (Equivalency)	20	20	–
Ice Hockey (Equivalency)	18	18	–
Basketball (Headcount)	15	10	–
Equestrian (Equivalency)	15	15	–
Soccer (Equivalency)	14	9.9	–
Field Hockey (Equivalency)	12	6.3	–
Volleyball (Headcount)	12	8	–

Breakdown of scholarship value per athlete and in total by division (2020)
Athletic division	Number of schools	Male athletes	Female athletes	Average male scholarship	Average female scholarship	Value of scholarships
Division I	357	90,241	74,986	$18,013	$18,722	$2.76 Billion
Division II	303	65,255	46,498	$6,588	$8,054	$752 Million
Division III	445	106,843	76,406	–	–	–

== NCAA men's lacrosse ==
The National Collegiate Athletic Association (NCAA) is the largest association and governing body of collegiate athletics in the United States. The NCAA holds lacrosse championships for all three Divisions in men's and women's lacrosse. As of the 2023 season (2022–23 school year), the NCAA has 398 men's lacrosse programs and 528 women's lacrosse programs.

=== Division I men's lacrosse ===
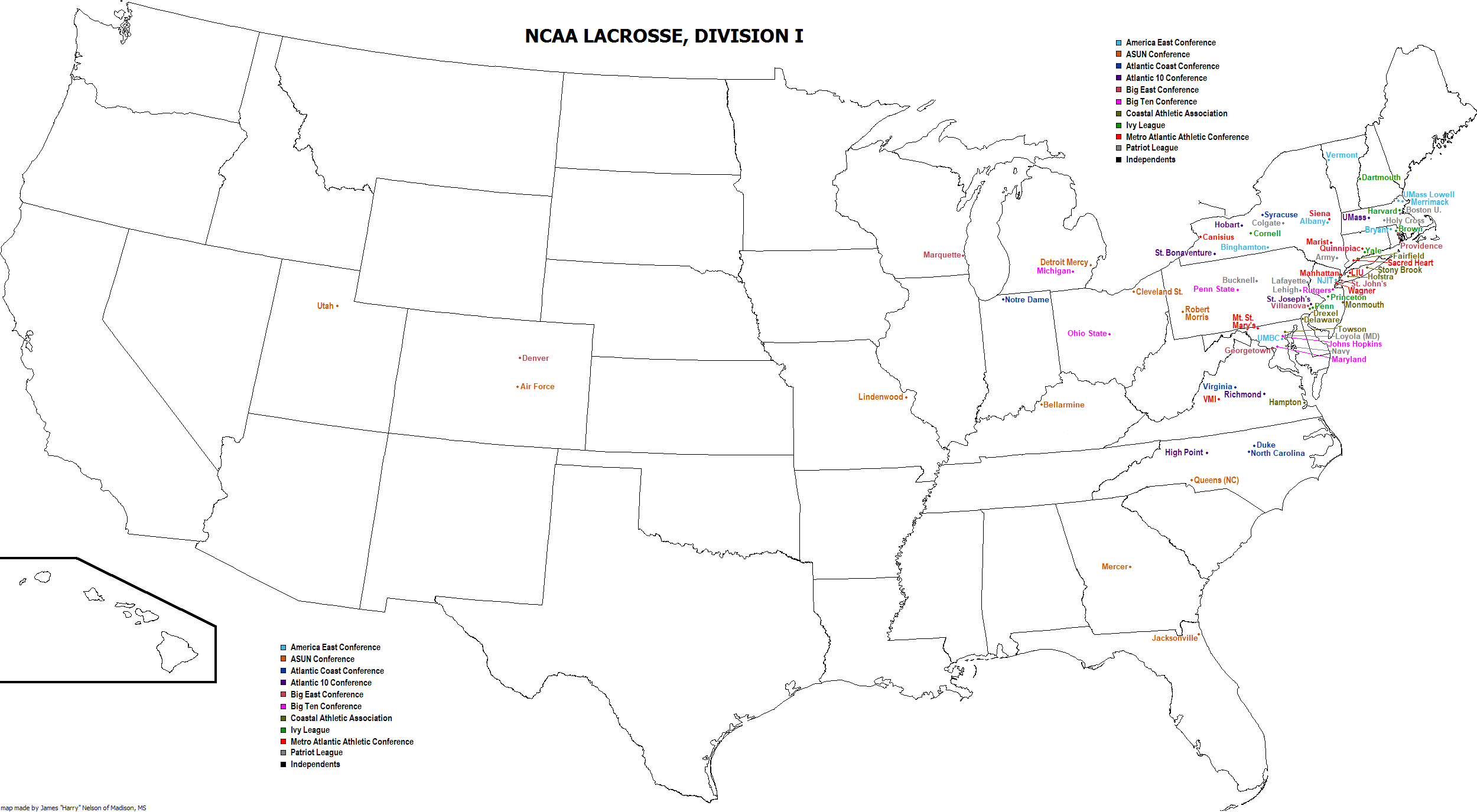
A map of NCAA Division I men's lacrosse teams

In the 2024 season, Division I men's lacrosse had the smallest number of teams compared to the Division II and Division III levels. The most recent 2024 NCAA lacrosse season involved 78 NCAA Division I men's lacrosse teams organized into 10 conferences. These teams are heavily concentrated in the Northeast and Mid-Atlantic regions, and only four teams are not in the Eastern Time Zone (Air Force, Denver, Marquette, and Utah; a fifth school with that distinction, Lindenwood, dropped men's lacrosse after the 2024 season).

From 1936 through 1970 the United States Intercollegiate Lacrosse Association (USILA) selected the Wingate Memorial Trophy winners as national champions based on regular season records. Beginning in 1971, the National Collegiate Athletic Association began holding an annual championship tournament. Cornell took the first title over Maryland, 12–6. Syracuse has 11 Division I titles (*one vacated later), Johns Hopkins 9, Virginia (7) and Princeton 6. The NCAA national championship weekend tournament normally draws over 80,000 fans. The most recent national champions from 2025 are the Cornell Big Red.

The most recent change to the conference lineup was announced in October 2023, when the Northeast Conference (NEC), which had dropped the sport after the 2022 season, reinstated the sport effective with the 2025 season. The last previous change was announced during the 2022 NCAA tournament, when the Atlantic 10 Conference (A-10) made official its widely-rumored sponsorship of men's lacrosse effective in the 2023 season. This move, along with other moves during the 2020s conference realignment, led to the NEC and Southern Conference dropping men's lacrosse after the 2022 season, although as noted the NEC's elimination of men's lacrosse proved to be temporary.

Two men's lacrosse schools started transitions from Division II to Division I in July 2022. Lindenwood and Queens (NC) are playing men's lacrosse in the Atlantic Sun Conference (ASUN), with Queens as a full member and Lindenwood as an affiliate. Hartford began a transition from Division I to Division III in the 2021–22 school year; the 2023 season was its last in Division I before joining the Commonwealth Coast Conference, now known as the Conference of New England, in July 2023. Le Moyne started a transition from D-II to D-I in the 2023–24 school year, joining the NEC and playing as an independent in 2024 before the reinstatement of NEC men's lacrosse in 2025. As noted earlier, Lindenwood dropped men's lacrosse after the 2024 season (along with eight other NCAA sports).

In September 2018 the NCAA rules committee implemented an 80-second shot clock that begins upon possession. A team must advance the ball across midfield within the first 20 seconds, and then 60 seconds to shoot the ball once across midfield. The clock will only reset if the ball hits the goalie or the post. Failure to score before the shot clock runs out results in a change of possession.

Conferences

- America East Conference
- Atlantic Coast Conference
- Atlantic Sun Conference
- Atlantic 10 Conference
- Big East Conference
- Big Ten Conference
- Coastal Athletic Association
- Ivy League
- Metro Atlantic Athletic Conference
- Northeast Conference
- Patriot League

=== Division II men's lacrosse ===
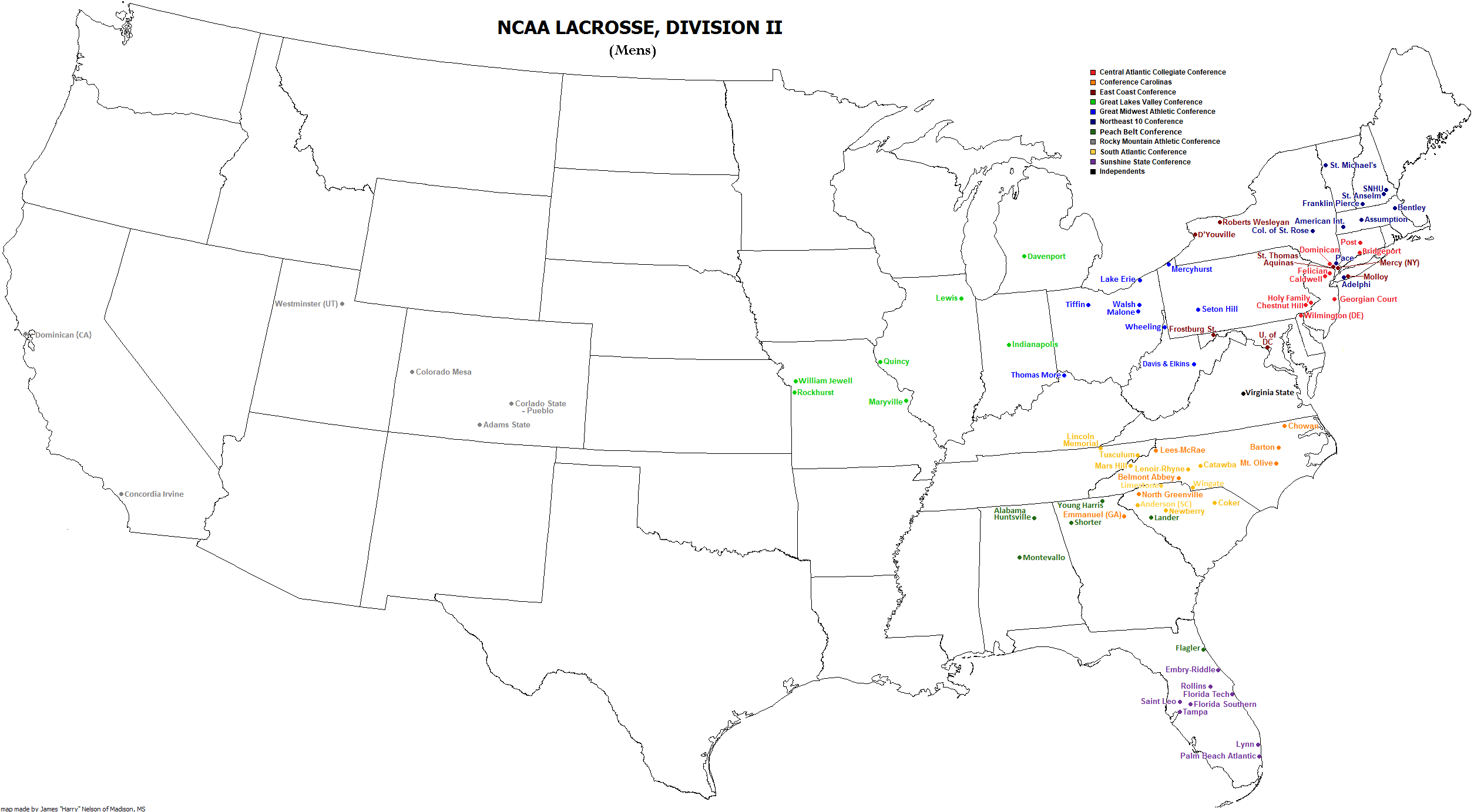
A map of NCAA Division II men's lacrosse teams.

Division II lacrosse is made up of 77 teams, mainly located in the Northeast and Southeast. The USILA conducted a "small college" lacrosse championship tournament in 1972 and 1973. Division II men's lacrosse held its first NCAA tournament in 1974 with an eight-team bracket. The format remained the same until 1980, when the field dropped to just two teams as the Division III tournament was inaugurated. From 1982 through 1992, a Division II playoff was not conducted. In 2001, a four-team bracket was instituted. The Division II men’s lacrosse championship bracket expanded from four to eight teams starting with the 2013 season. Adelphi University currently holds the record for the most D-II championships, with eight; it also has the most appearances in the championship match with 12.

NCAA Division II lacrosse programs are organized into eight conferences, as well as independent programs consisting of mainly new D-II lacrosse teams. The newest addition to the roster of Division II men's lacrosse conferences came in 2017–18 when the Great Lakes Valley Conference began sponsoring men's lacrosse.

On December 2, 2014; the University of Alabama in Huntsville (UAH) announced the addition of men's and women's lacrosse programs. These programs began competition with the 2016 season, initially as independents.

The most recent Division II men's national champions are the Adelphi Panthers.

Conferences:

- Central Atlantic Collegiate Conference
- Conference Carolinas
- East Coast Conference
- Great Lakes Valley Conference
- Great Midwest Athletic Conference
- Northeast-10 Conference
- Rocky Mountain Athletic Conference
- South Atlantic Conference
- Sunshine State Conference

=== Division III men's lacrosse ===
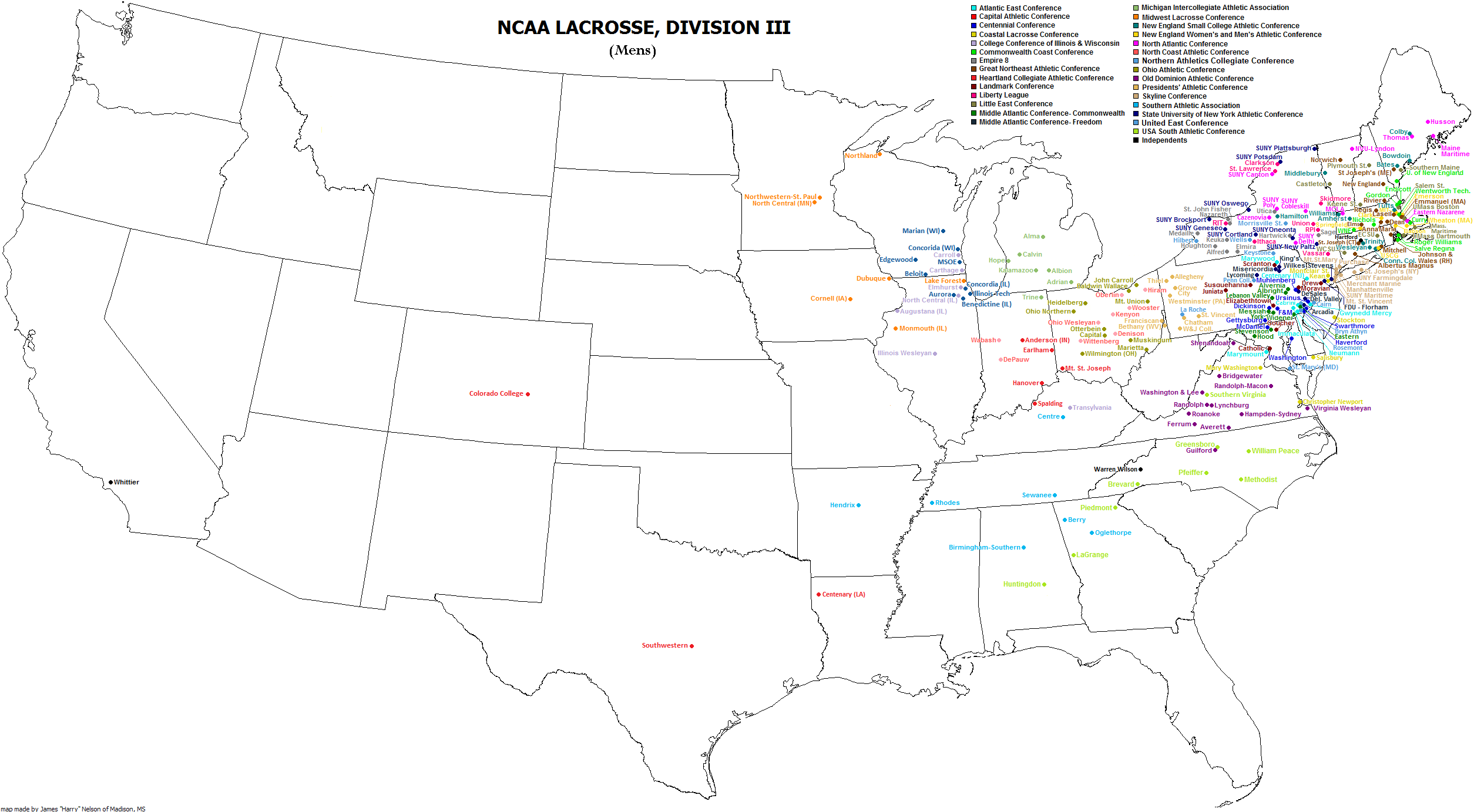
A map of NCAA Division III men's lacrosse teams.

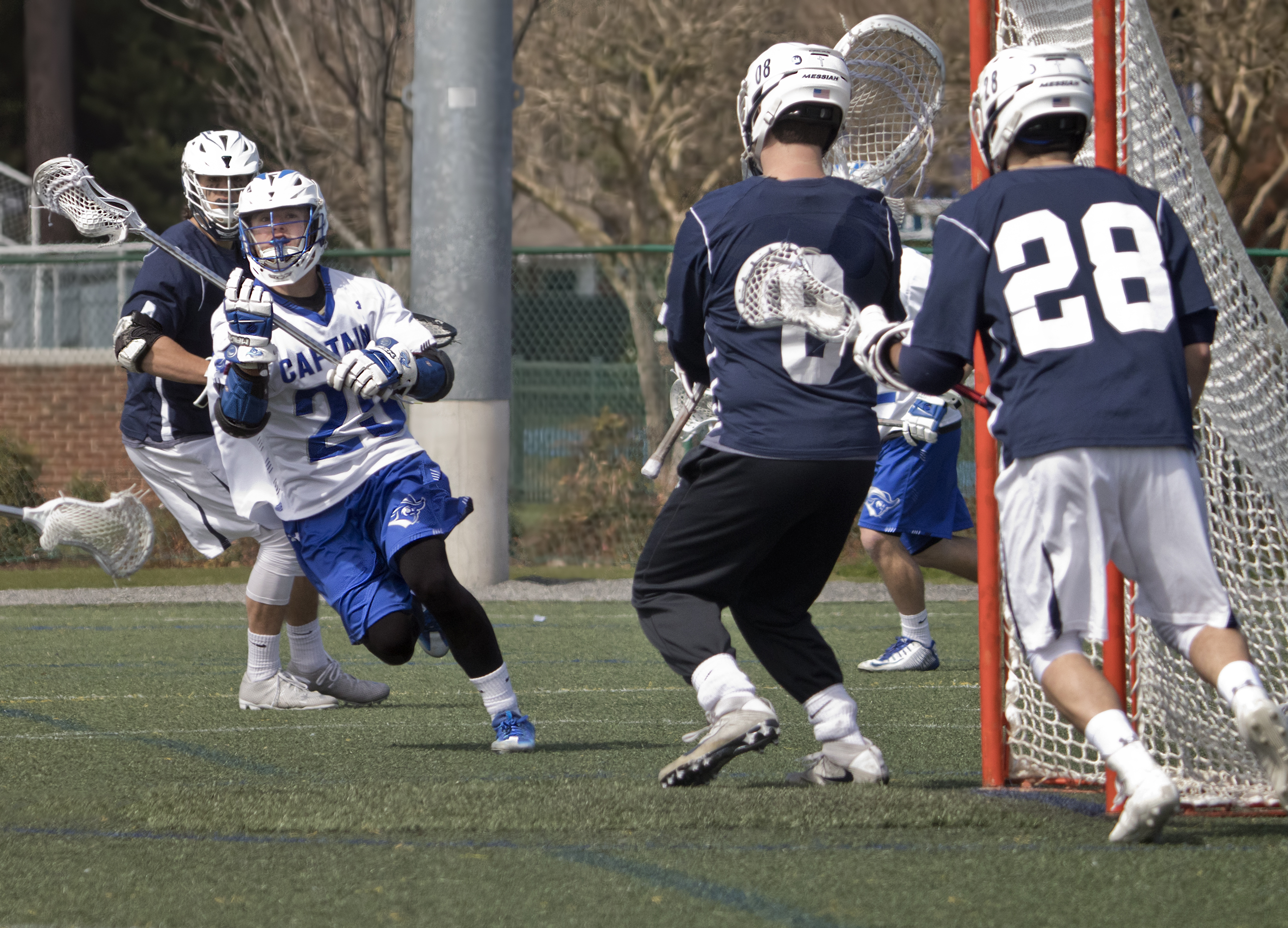
A game between Christopher Newport and Messiah in 2016

The majority of schools playing NCAA men's lacrosse play in Division III, with 245 in all. Most Division III lacrosse teams are located in the Northeast, with only seven programs west of the Mississippi River (with two others in cities on that river's east bank). Only two of these schools are west of the Central Time Zone. The USILA conducted a "small college" championship in 1972 and 1973. The NCAA Division III championship originally was combined with Division II from 1974–1979, before the NCAA split the non-Division I schools into separate Division II and III tournaments in 1980. Salisbury University shares the record for most D-III championships with 13, and has sole possession of the record for most championship game appearances with 18. The other holder of the record for most championships, Hobart, won the championship the first 12 years it was held from 1980–1991, and appeared in the championship game 15 times. The 12 consecutive championships are an NCAA record but Hobart has not won again since 1993, and now plays at the Division I level.

NCAA Division III lacrosse programs are organized into 22 conferences and over 20 independent programs. The number of conferences dropped by two after the 2023 season; the New England Collegiate Conference, with only four full members in that season, disbanded as an all-sports conference, while the Colonial States Athletic Conference and United East Conference merged under the United East banner.

The defending Division III national champions are the Tufts Jumbos.

Conferences:

- Allegheny Mountain Collegiate Conference
- Centennial Conference
- Coast to Coast Athletic Conference
- College Conference of Illinois and Wisconsin
- Conference of New England
- Empire 8
- Great Northeast Athletic Conference
- Heartland Collegiate Athletic Conference
- Landmark Conference
- Liberty League
- Little East Conference
- Middle Atlantic Conference
- Michigan Intercollegiate Athletic Association
- Midwest Lacrosse Conference
- New England Small College Athletic Conference
- New England Women's and Men's Athletic Conference
- North Atlantic Conference
- North Coast Athletic Conference
- Ohio Athletic Conference
- Old Dominion Athletic Conference
- Presidents' Athletic Conference
- Skyline Conference
- Southern Athletic Association
- Southern Collegiate Athletic Conference
- State University of New York Athletic Conference
- United East Conference
- USA South Athletic Conference

== NCAA women's lacrosse ==
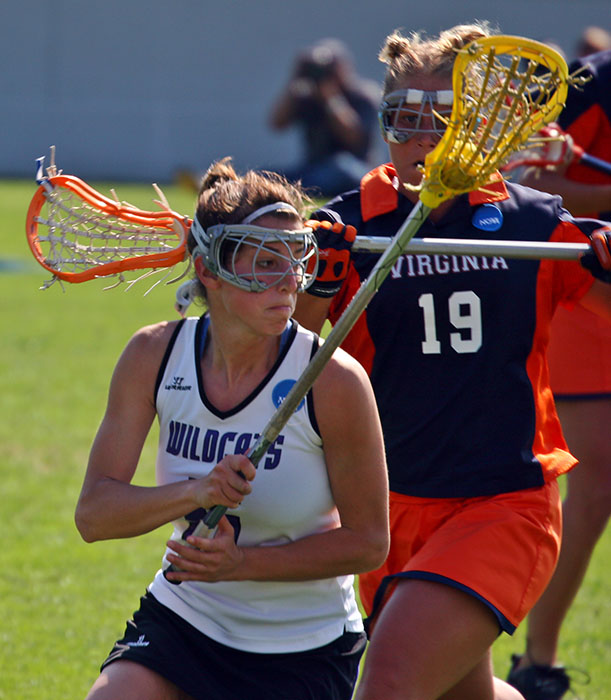
Virginia vs. Northwestern (2005)

Women's college lacrosse differs significantly from men's lacrosse in terms of rules and equipment. The NCAA holds lacrosse championships for all three divisions and currently has 528 women's lacrosse programs. Women's collegiate lacrosse was originally governed by the U.S. Women's Lacrosse Association, which joined with the Association for Intercollegiate Athletics for Women (AIAW) to determine an annual champion. The USWLA and AIAW conducted championships from 1978–1982 before being usurped by the NCAA. The NCAA began sponsoring a Division III championship in 1985 and added a Division II championship in 2001.

=== Division I women's lacrosse ===
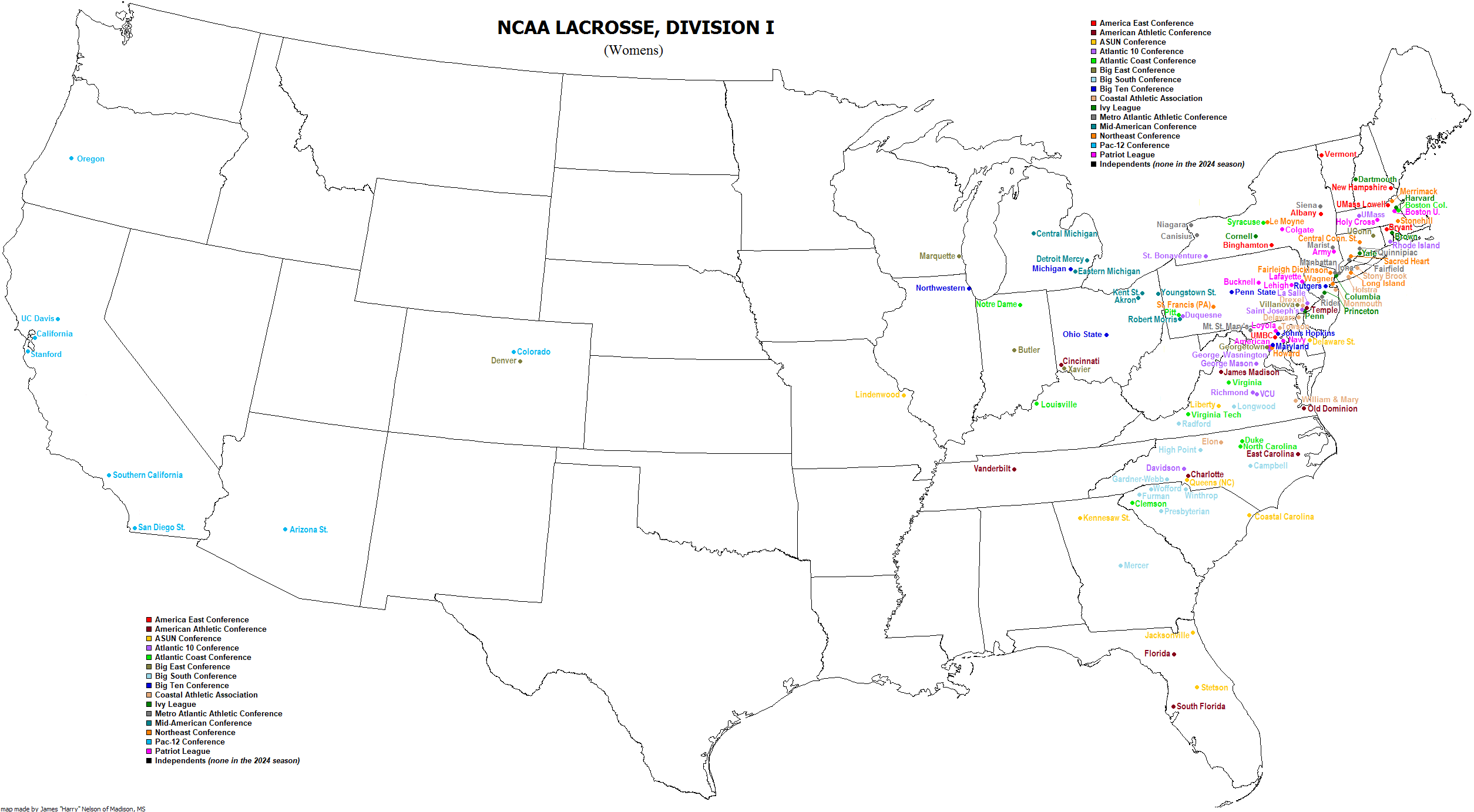
A map of NCAA Division I women's lacrosse teams

The NCAA began sponsoring a women's lacrosse championship in 1982. Lacrosse has grown into 127 NCAA Division I women's lacrosse teams organized into 15 conferences. Only 13 programs are located outside the Eastern Time Zone — Denver, Lindenwood, Marquette, Northwestern, Vanderbilt, six schools that left the Pac-12 Conference in 2024, and two other California schools. Of these 13 schools, only Denver and Marquette also sponsor varsity men's lacrosse; Lindenwood dropped men's lacrosse after the 2024 season.

The most recent change to the lineup of women's lacrosse conferences came during the 2024–25 offseason. The Pac-12, which had sponsored the sport with six full members and two affiliates, collapsed, with 10 of its 12 full members (including all full members with women's lacrosse teams) leaving for other conferences. With the impending collapse of the Pac-12 as a backdrop, the Big 12 Conference announced it would start sponsoring women's lacrosse in the spring 2025 season. While its pre-2024 membership featured only one sponsoring school (Cincinnati), it picked up two lacrosse schools from the collapsing Pac-12 (Arizona State and former full member Colorado). The Big 12 reached the six sponsoring schools required for an automatic NCAA tournament bid by bringing in three affiliates: Florida, previously a women's lacrosse member of the American Athletic Conference (The American); and San Diego State and UC Davis, which had previously been Pac-12 affiliates. The other lacrosse schools that left the Pac-12 joined conferences that sponsored the sport; California and Stanford moved to the ACC, and Oregon and USC joined the Big Ten.

Three schools will start Division I play in the 2025 season. All will compete in their current all-sports homes—Charlotte and South Florida in The American, and Rhode Island in the Atlantic 10 Conference.

The current Division I national champions are the Boston College Eagles.

Conferences:

- America East Conference
- American Athletic Conference
- Atlantic 10 Conference
- Atlantic Coast Conference
- Atlantic Sun Conference
- Big East Conference
- Big South Conference
- Big Ten Conference
- Big 12 Conference
- Coastal Athletic Association
- Ivy League
- Metro Atlantic Athletic Conference
- Mid-American Conference
- Northeast Conference
- Patriot League

=== Division II women's lacrosse ===
A total of 113 programs compete at the Division II level. Division II women's lacrosse is one of the newest championships sponsored by the NCAA. The first Division II women's lacrosse championship was held in 2001, when C.W. Post beat West Chester 13–9. Since then, the Division II level has been dominated, much like its men's counterpart, by Adelphi University with nine national championships, most recently in 2019.

The 114 NCAA Division II women's lacrosse programs are organized into 10 conferences, as well as independent programs.

The defending Division II national champions are the Tampa Spartans.

Conferences:

- Central Atlantic Collegiate Conference
- Conference Carolinas
- East Coast Conference
- Great Lakes Valley Conference
- Gulf South Conference
- Mountain East Conference
- Northeast-10 Conference
- Pennsylvania State Athletic Conference
- Rocky Mountain Athletic Conference
- South Atlantic Conference
- Sunshine State Conference

=== Division III women's lacrosse ===
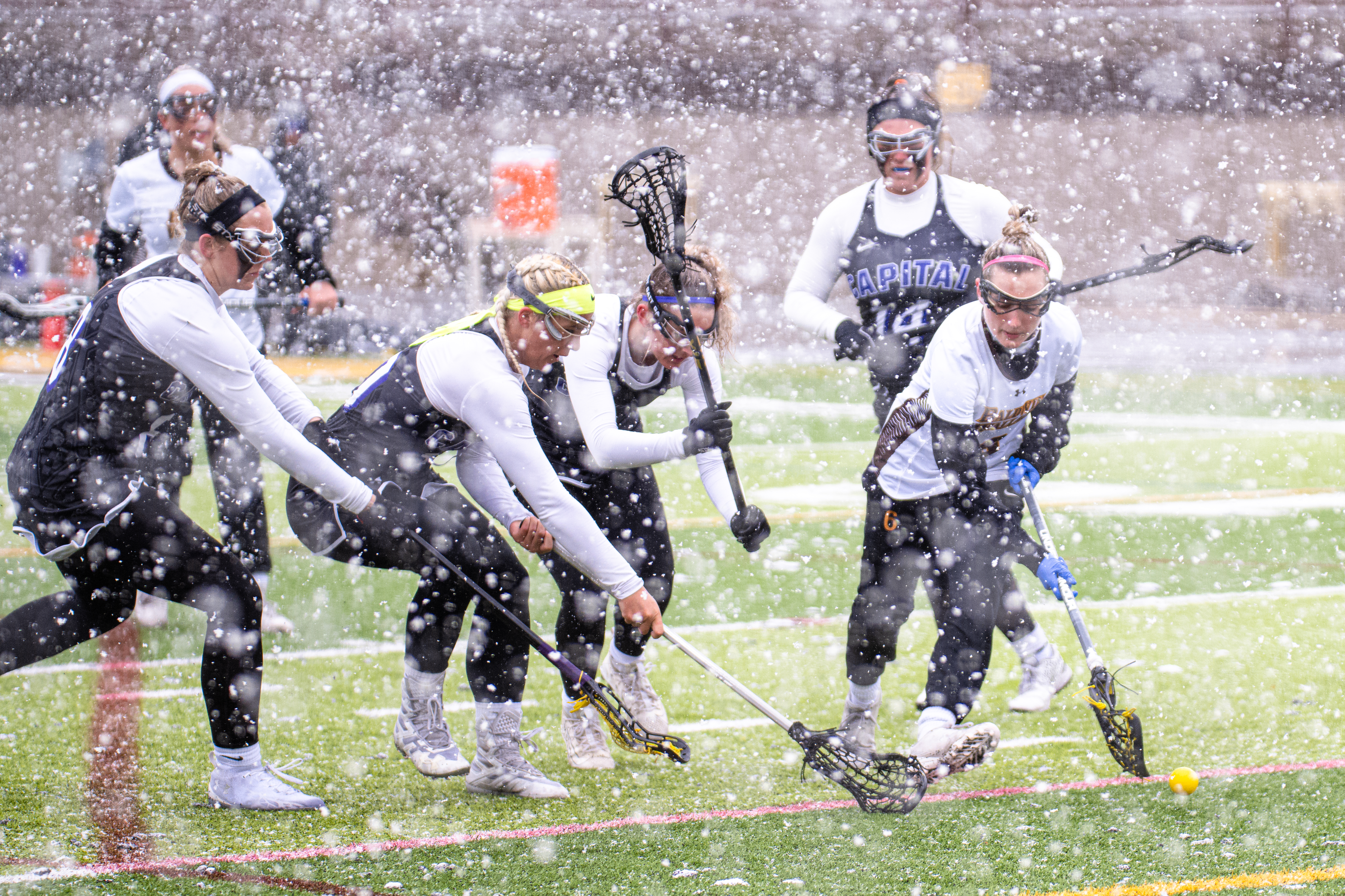
A March 2022 game between Capital and Baldwin Wallace

The NCAA Division III level is made up of 288 women's lacrosse teams. It is the largest women's lacrosse division and also the largest NCAA lacrosse division, surpassing the number of men's Division III teams by 43 members.

As noted in the Division III men's lacrosse section, the number of conferences dropped by two in the 2024 season, with the New England Collegiate Conference disbanding and the Colonial States Athletic Conference merging into the United East Conference.

The defending Division III national champions are the Middlebury Panthers.

Conferences:

- Centennial Conference
- College Conference of Illinois and Wisconsin
- Coast to Coast Athletic Conference
- Conference of New England
- Empire 8
- Great Northeast Athletic Conference
- Landmark Conference
- Liberty League
- Little East Conference
- Massachusetts State Collegiate Athletic Conference
- Middle Atlantic Conference
- New England Small College Athletic Conference
- New England Women's and Men's Athletic Conference
- New Jersey Athletic Conference
- North Atlantic Conference
- North Coast Athletic Conference
- Northern Athletics Collegiate Conference
- Ohio Athletic Conference
- Ohio River Lacrosse Conference
- Old Dominion Athletic Conference
- Skyline Conference
- Southern Athletic Association
- Southern California Intercollegiate Athletic Conference
- Southern Collegiate Athletic Conference
- State University of New York Athletic Conference
- United East Conference
- USA South Athletic Conference
- Wisconsin Intercollegiate Athletic Conference

== NAIA lacrosse ==
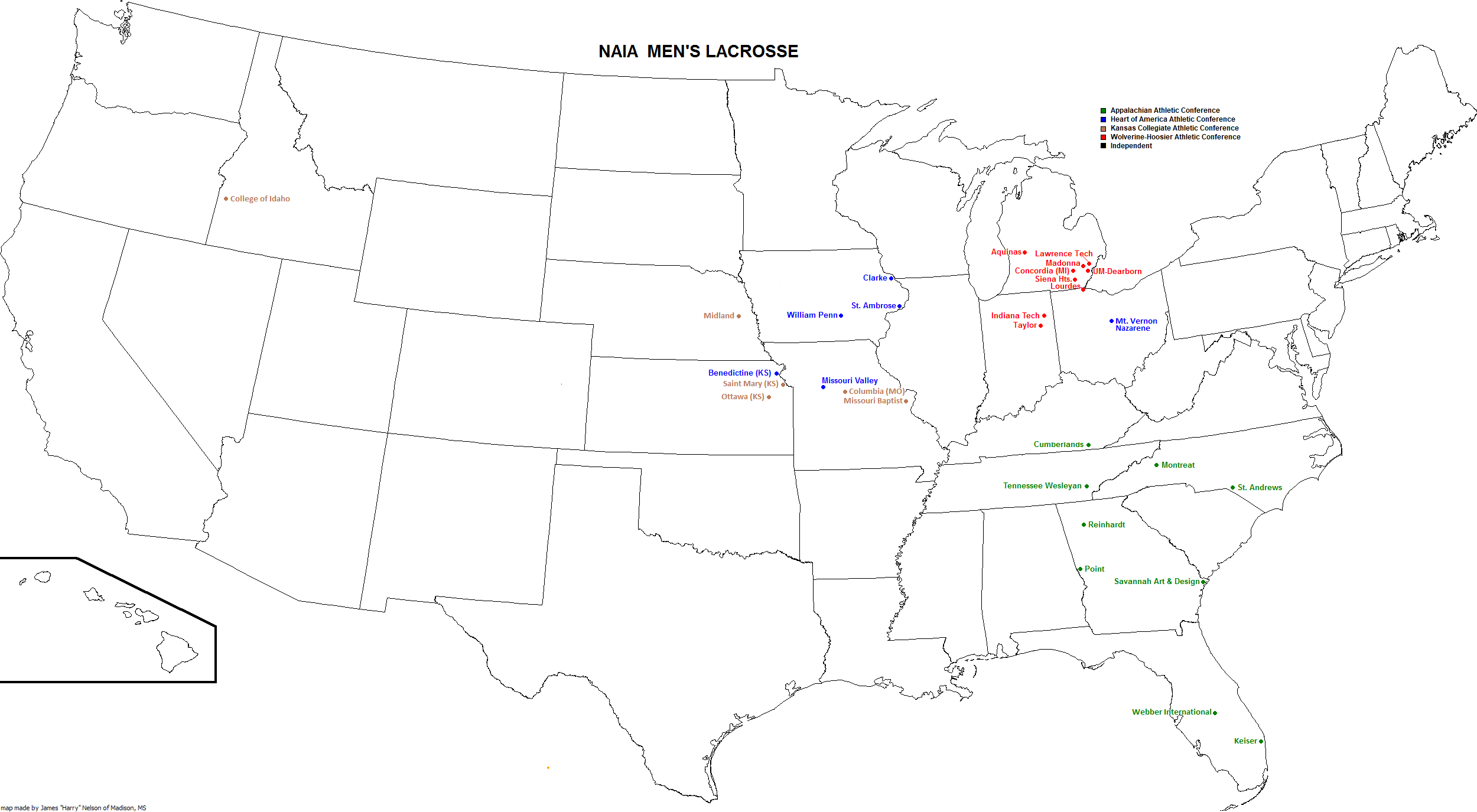
Map of varsity NAIA men's lacrosse teams.

As of October, 2016, There are a 39 National Association of Intercollegiate Athletics (NAIA) schools that offer men’s and/or women’s varsity lacrosse, Lacrosse is an officially recognized sport by the NAIA. NAIA programs are currently in year two of NAIA invitational sport status. During this phase of recognition, teams compete to participate in a post season championship called the NAIA National Invitational. Each conference and A.I.I group receive one automatic qualifier with the remaining four bids going to the highest remaining teams from the NAIA national ranking. NAIA programs also regularly compete against NCAA DII and DIII teams. The Wolverine-Hoosier Athletic Conference (WHAC) announced on January 27, 2012, the addition of lacrosse for both men and women as conference sports effective the fall of 2012. The WHAC was the first conference in the NAIA to offer lacrosse as a conference championship sport. The Appalachian Athletics Conference and the Kansas Collegiate Athletic Conference recognized lacrosse as a conference sport in the Fall of 2015.

== NJCAA lacrosse ==
The National Junior College Athletic Association (NJCAA) is the primary governing body of community college athletic programs in the USA and currently oversees 21 men's and 11 women's lacrosse programs predominately in the Northeastern United States. The NJCAA lacrosse programs do not compete in their regular conferences, but instead are ranked within their NJCAA Regions. The NJCAA has sponsored a men's lacrosse championship since 1970 and a women's lacrosse championship since 2004. There are also new lacrosse programs at community colleges that are not members of the NJCAA, such as the California Community College Athletic Association, which does not sponsor the sport at this time.

== Men's club lacrosse ==
=== Men's Collegiate Lacrosse Association (MCLA) ===
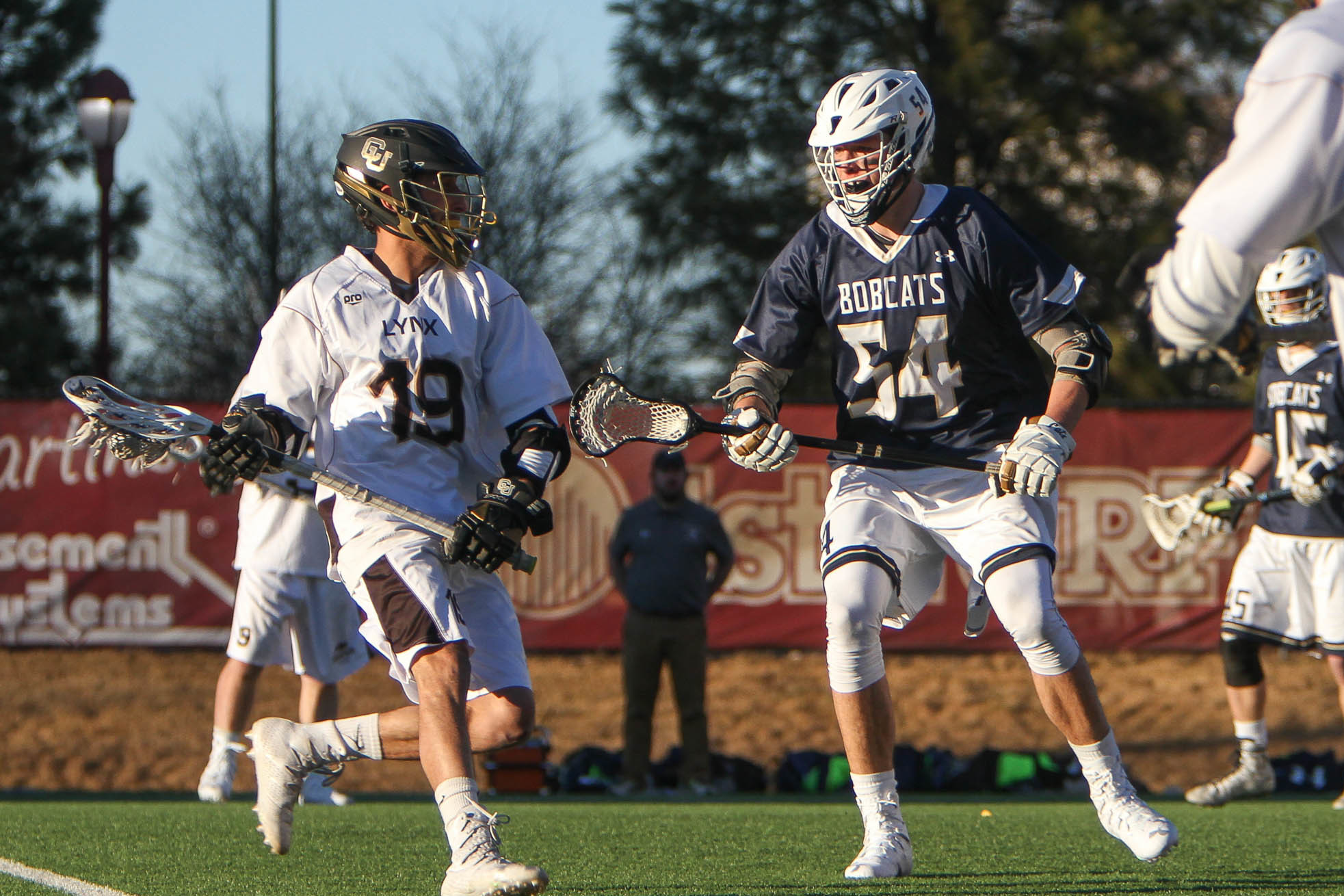
CU Denver vs. Montana State in an MCLA D-II game in 2017

The Men's Collegiate Lacrosse Association (MCLA), formerly known as the US Lacrosse Men’s Division of Intercollegiate Associates (USL MDIA), is a national organization of non-NCAA, college men's lacrosse programs. The MCLA was created by the MDIA Board of Directors and its creation was announced by US Lacrosse on August 24, 2006. The MCLA oversees play and conducts national championships for 184 non-NCAA men's lacrosse programs in 10 conferences and in two divisions throughout the country.

The defending 2023 National Champions at the MCLA Division I level are the Concordia-Irvine Eagles. The Division II National Champions are the Dayton Flyers.

Conferences:

- Atlantic Lacrosse Conference
- Continental Lacrosse Conference
- Lone Star Alliance
- Pacific Northwest Collegiate Lacrosse League
- Rocky Mountain Lacrosse Conference
- SouthEastern Lacrosse Conference
- Southwestern Lacrosse Conference
- Upper Midwest Lacrosse Conference
- Western Collegiate Lacrosse League

=== National College Lacrosse League (NCLL) ===
The National College Lacrosse League (NCLL) is a men's lacrosse league comprising mostly Eastern US college lacrosse clubs (non-varsity). There are approximately 130 teams divided into 12 conferences. The programs are split into Division I and Division II. Many of the clubs are at schools that currently have varsity NCAA Men's lacrosse programs.

Conferences:

- Blue Ridge Conference
- Capitol Conference
- Chesapeake Conference
- Deep South Lacrosse Conference
- Eastern Pennsylvania Conference
- Empire East Conference
- Empire West Conference
- Keystone Conference
- Liberty Conference
- Midwest North Conference
- Midwest South Conference
- NY Metro Conference
- Tidewater Conference

=== Southern Men's Lacrosse League (SMLL) ===
The Southern Men's Lacrosse League (SMLL) is a league for non-NCAA, college men's lacrosse programs. It was founded in 2023 and current consists of nine teams: Mississippi State, Samford University, Western Kentucky, South Alabama, UT Chattanooga, Western Carolina, Morehouse College, Georgia College & State University, and Emory University.

Georgia College won the 2024 SMLL Championship. The 2025 SMLL Championship will be April 12th in Locust Grove, GA.

=== Other U.S. college club lacrosse leagues ===
- Great Lakes Lacrosse League (GLLL)
- California Junior College Lacrosse Association (CJCLA)

== Women's club lacrosse ==
=== Women's Collegiate Lacrosse Associates (WCLA) ===
The Women's Collegiate Lacrosse Associates (WCLA) is a collection of over 260 college club teams that compete under the US Lacrosse umbrella. Teams are organized into various leagues and two divisions. The association regulates different aspects of the teams, including minimum number of games played. A recent rule modification allows community colleges to become members. Teams that have been classified as either Division I or Division II have the opportunity to compete in a national championship each spring under US Lacrosse.

- Central Plains Women's Lacrosse League
- Central Women's Lacrosse League
- Carolina Women's Lacrosse League
- East Coast Women's Lacrosse Association
- Mid Atlantic Women's Lacrosse League
- North East Women's Lacrosse League
- Rocky Mountain Women's Lacrosse League
- Southeastern Women's Lacrosse League
- Texas Women's Lacrosse League
- Western Women's Lacrosse League
- Women's Collegiate Lacrosse League
- Women's Lacrosse Association

== See also ==
- F. Morris Touchstone Award
- Intercollegiate sports team champions#Lacrosse, Women
- List of college lacrosse events
- NCAA Division I men's lacrosse tournament
- NCAA Division II men's lacrosse tournament
- NCAA Division III men's lacrosse tournament
- NCAA Division I women's lacrosse tournament
- NCAA Division II women's lacrosse tournament
- NCAA Division III women's lacrosse tournament
- USILA All-American Team
- U.S. Lacrosse
- US Lacrosse Women's Division Intercollegiate Associates
- Lacrosse in Pennsylvania
