= Rocky Mountain Lacrosse Conference =

- Conference: MCLA
- Founded: 1976
- Commissioner: John Robinette
- Sports fielded: College lacrosse
- No. of teams: 18
- Headquarters: Durango, Colorado
- Region: Mountain
- Website: http://mcla.us/RMLC/

The Rocky Mountain Lacrosse Conference (RMLC) is one of ten conferences in the Men's Collegiate Lacrosse Association. Currently the RMLC consists of 18 teams encompassing four Rocky Mountain states; Colorado, Utah, Montana, and Wyoming. It is divided into two divisions, Division I and Division II. Division II is separated further by region; Northwest and Southeast

== History ==
The RMLC, first known as the RMLA, was formed in 1976 with founding members Colorado State University, University of Colorado, Regis University, Air Force Academy, University of Denver, and Colorado School of Mines. In 1997, the Conference changed names to the Rocky Mountain Intercollegiate Lacrosse League (RMILL) and went to a club-only league as a member of the US Lacrosse Intercollegiate Associates (USLIA), which reorganized into the Men's Collegiate Lacrosse Association (MCLA) in 2006.

The RMLC has been the home conference of the MCLA Division I National Champions in 1999, 2001, 2003, 2006, 2012 and 2013 (Colorado State University); in 1997, 2000, 2007, 2011 (Brigham Young University); and in 2014 (University of Colorado). In Division II, Westminster College were National Champions in 2008, and the University of Utah won in 2022.

In 2017, Utah announced that they were going to elevate their program to play as an NCAA Division 1 Independent, turning them from a club team to an NCAA team. After the 2018 season, they left the conference. In 2019, the RMLC announced that the University of Texas and the University of Oklahoma would join the conference at the Division 1 level starting in the 2020 season. Due to the COVID-19 pandemic, their first game in the conference had to be pushed back to 2021. In 2021, it was revealed that Oklahoma would leave the conference to go back to the Lone Star Alliance. With the news, Oklahoma would leave the conference without playing a single game in the conference.

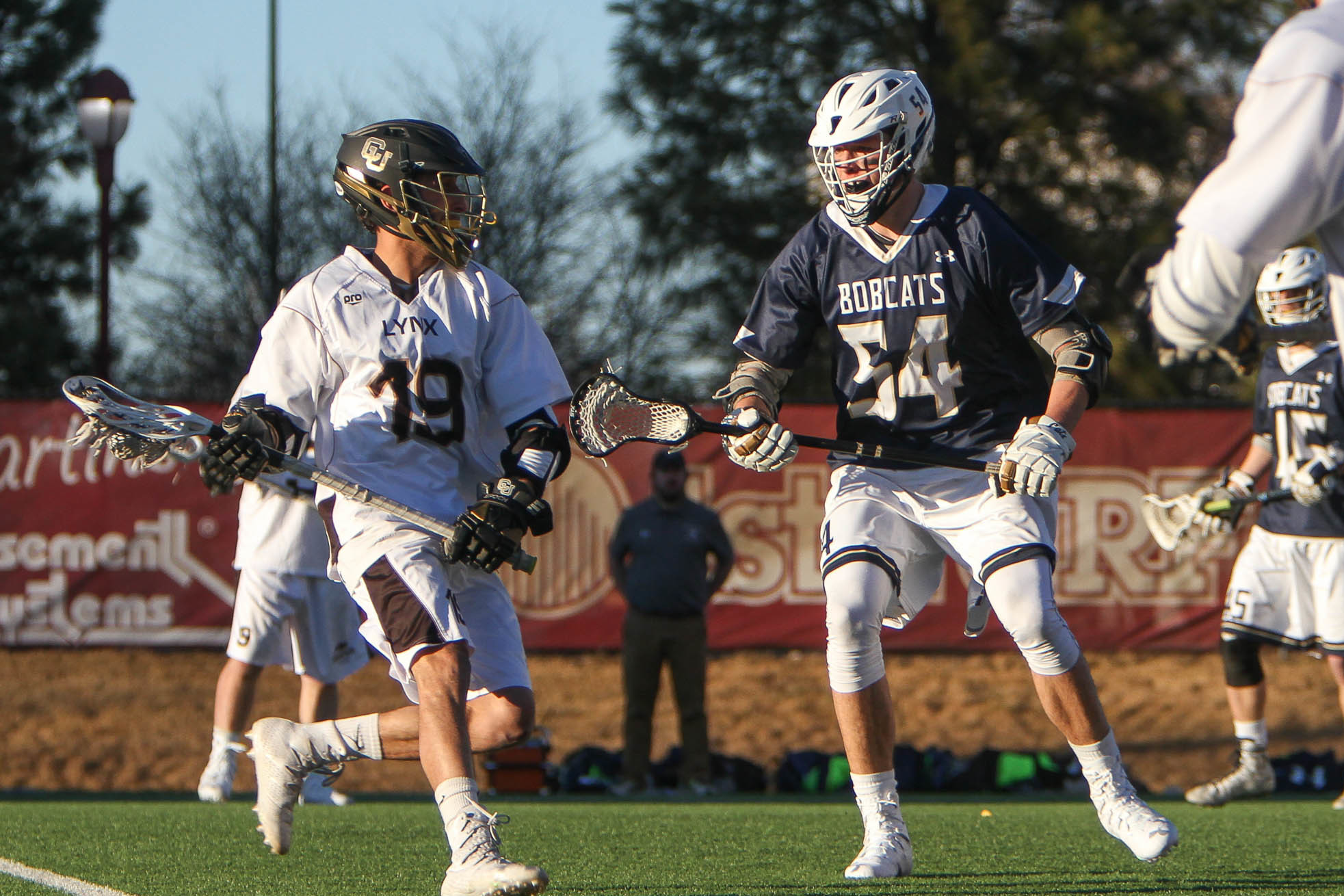
A game between Montana State and Colorado-Denver in 2017

== Teams ==
Institution	Location	Founded	Affiliation	Enrollment	Team Nickname	Primary conference
Division I
Brigham Young University	Provo, Utah	1875	Private (LDS)	34,802	Cougars	Big 12 (Division I)
University of Colorado Boulder	Boulder, Colorado	1876	Public	37,956	Buffaloes	Big 12 (Division I)
Colorado State University	Fort Collins, Colorado	1870	Public	32,777	Rams	Mountain West (Division I)
University of Utah	Salt Lake City, Utah	1850	Public	34,464	Utes	Big 12 (Division I)
Utah Tech University	St. George, Utah	1911	Public	12,266	Trailblazers	WAC (Division I)
Utah Valley University	Orem, Utah	1941	Public	41,262	Wolverines	WAC (Division I)
Division II
United States Air Force Academy	Colorado Springs, Colorado	1954	Public	4,181	Falcons	Mountain West (Division I)
Colorado School of Mines	Golden, Colorado	1873	Public	7,172	Orediggers	Rocky Mountain (Division II)
University of Denver	Denver, Colorado	1864	Private	14,130	Pioneers	Summit (Division I)
Metropolitan State University of Denver	Denver, Colorado	1965	Public	17,678	Roadrunners	Rocky Mountain (Division II)
Montana State University	Bozeman, Montana	1893	Public	16,841	Bobcats	Big Sky (Division I)
Southern Utah University	Cedar City, Utah	1897	Public	13,611	Thunderbirds	WAC (Division I)
Utah State University	Logan, Utah	1888	Public	27,426	Aggies	Mountain West (Division I)
University of Wyoming	Laramie, Wyoming	1886	Public	11,479	Cowboys	Mountain West (Division I)
Division III
Fort Lewis College	Durango, Colorado	1911	Public	3,550	Skyhawks	Rocky Mountain (Division II)
University of New Mexico	Albuquerque, New Mexico	1889	Public	21,738	Lobos	Mountain West (Division I)
University of Northern Colorado	Greeley, Colorado	1889	Public	8,869	Bears	Big Sky (Division I)
Western Colorado University	Gunnison, Colorado	1901	Public	3,692	Mountaineers	Rocky Mountain (Division II)

== Former teams ==
Institution	Location	Nickname	Enrollment	New Conference
Boise State University	Boise, Idaho	Broncos	25,540	PNCLL (MCLA)
Colorado College	Colorado Springs, Colorado	Tigers	2,012	SCAC (NCAA Division III)
Johnson & Wales University	Denver, Colorado	Wildcats	1,291	Defunct
Northern Arizona University	Flagstaff, Arizona	Lumberjacks	29,569	SLC (MCLA)
Regis University	Denver, Colorado	Rangers	8,368	Defunct
University of Denver	Denver, Colorado	Pioneers	12,931	Big East (NCAA Division I)
University of Colorado Colorado Springs	Colorado Springs, Colorado	Mountain Lions	12,031	Defunct
University of Colorado Denver	Denver, Colorado	Lynx	24,267	Defunct
University of Oklahoma	Norman, Oklahoma	Sooners	28,564	LSA (MCLA)
University of Texas at Austin	Austin, Texas	Longhorns	51,090	LSA (MCLA)
University of Utah	Salt Lake City, Utah	Utes	32,818	ASUN (NCAA Division I)
Weber State University	Ogden, Utah	Wildcats	26,681	Defunct
Westminster College	Salt Lake City, Utah	Griffins	2,887	RMAC (NCAA Division II)

== Conference Championships ==
Division I
Year	Champion	Runner-up
1991	Air Force	Colorado College
1992		
1993	Colorado	Denver
1994	Colorado College	Denver
1995	Colorado College	Denver
1996	Colorado College	Denver
1997	**Brigham Young**	
1998	Brigham Young	Colorado State
1999	Brigham Young	**Colorado State**
2000	Colorado State	Colorado
2001	Brigham Young	**Colorado State**
2002	Colorado State	Brigham Young
2003	**Colorado State**	Brigham Young
2004	Colorado State	Colorado
2005	Brigham Young	Colorado State
2006	**Colorado State**	Colorado
2007	**Brigham Young**	Colorado State
2008	Brigham Young	Colorado State
2009	Brigham Young	Colorado
2010	Colorado State	Brigham Young
2011	Colorado State	**Brigham Young**
2012	**Colorado State**	Brigham Young
2013	**Colorado State**	Colorado
2014	**Colorado**	Brigham Young
2015	Colorado	Brigham Young
2016	Brigham Young	Colorado
2017	Brigham Young	Colorado
2018	Utah	Colorado
2019	Colorado	Utah Valley
2020	No Championship due to COVID-19 pandemic	
2021	No Championship due to COVID-19 pandemic	
2022	Brigham Young	Colorado
2023	Utah Valley	Brigham Young
2024	**Brigham Young**	Colorado State
2025	Utah Valley	Brigham Young
2026	**Brigham Young**	Utah Valley

Division I Championship Records
Team	Championships	Championship years	Runner-ups	Runner-up years
Brigham Young	13	**1997**, 1998, 1999, 2001, 2005, **2007**, 2008, 2009, 2016, 2017, 2022, **2024**, **2026**	9	2002, 2003, 2010, **2011**, 2012, 2014, 2015, 2023, 2025
Colorado State	9	2000, 2002, **2003**, 2004, 2010, 2011, **2012**, **2013**	7	1998, **1999**, **2001**, 2005, 2007, 2008, 2024
Colorado	4	1993, **2014**, 2015, 2019	9	2000, 2004, 2006, 2009, 2013, 2016, 2017, 2018, 2022
Colorado College	3	1994, 1995, 1996	1	1991
Utah Valley	2	2023, 2025	2	2019, 2026
Air Force	1	1991		
Utah	1	2018		
Denver			3	1994, 1995, 1996

- Note: **Bold text** denotes MCLA National Champion
- Note: Italic text denotes MCLA National Champion runner-up

Division II
Year	Champion	Runner-up
1999	Utah	Colorado School of Mines
2000	Utah Valley	Northern Colorado
2001	Utah Valley	Boise State
2002	Boise State	Utah State
2003	Utah Valley	Fort Lewis
2004	Fort Lewis	Utah Valley
2005	Utah Valley	Montana State
2006	Utah Valley	Northern Colorado
2007	Westminster	Northern Colorado
2008	**Westminster**	Fort Lewis
2009	Northern Colorado	Westminster
2010	Utah Valley	Westminster
2011	Westminster	Northern Colorado
2012	Westminster	Fort Lewis
2013	Westminster	Fort Lewis
2014	Montana State	Northern Colorado
2015	Utah State	Fort Lewis
2016	Montana State	MSU Denver
2017	MSU Denver	Montana State
2018	Montana State	Colorado Denver
2019	Utah State	Montana State
2020	No Championship due to COVID-19 pandemic	
2021	No Championship due to COVID-19 pandemic	
2022	**Utah**	Montana State
2023	Air Force	Montana State
2024	Air Force	**Montana State**
2025	Montana State	Utah State
2026	Air Force	Montana State

Division II Championship Records
Team	Championships	Championship years	Runner-ups	Runner-up years
Utah Valley	6	2000, 2001, 2003, 2005, 2006, 2010	1	2004
Westminster	5	2007, **2008**, 2011, 2012, 2013	2	2009, 2010
Montana State	4	2014, 2016, 2018, 2025	6	2017, 2019, 2022, 2023, **2024**, 2026
Air Force	3	2023, 2024, 2026		
Utah State	2	2015, 2019	2	2002, 2025
Boise State	1	2002	1	2001
Fort Lewis	1	2004	5	2003, 2008, 2012, 2013, 2015
Northern Colorado	1	2009	5	2000, 2006, 2007, 2011, 2014
MSU Denver	1	2017	1	2016
Utah	1	**2022**		
Colorado School of Mines			1	1999

- Note: **Bold text** denotes MCLA National Champion
- Note: Italic text denotes MCLA National Champion runner-up
