= University of Providence =

Catholic university in Great Falls, Montana, US

- Former name: List: Great Falls Junior College for Women (1932–1933); Great Falls Normal School (1933–1942); Great Falls College of Education (1942–1950s); College of Great Falls (1950s–1995); University of Great Falls (1995–2017)
- Motto: In lumine tuo, videmus lumen
- Motto in English: In Thy Light We See Light
- Type: Private university
- Established: 1932; 94 years ago
- Accreditation: NWCCU
- Religious affiliation: Roman Catholic
- Academic affiliations: Space-grant
- President: Oliver J. Doyle
- Provost: Matthew Redinger
- Students: 630 (fall 2025)
- Undergraduates: 541 (fall 2025)
- Postgraduates: 89 (fall 2025)
- Location: Great Falls, Montana, United States; 47.4916°N 111.2706°W
- Campus: 44 acres (18 ha)
- Colors: Argo Blue & Argo Green
- Nickname: Argonauts
- Sporting affiliations: NAIA – Frontier
- Website: uprovidence.edu
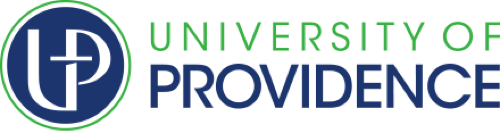

The University of Providence (UP, formerly University of Great Falls) is a private Catholic university in Great Falls, Montana, United States. It is accredited by the Northwest Commission on Colleges and Universities. In 2026, the university announced that it would close on August 20, 2027, citing falling enrollment and financial pressures.

== History ==
The University of Providence was founded in 1932 as "Great Falls Junior College for Women" by Edwin Vincent O'Hara, the Catholic Bishop of Great Falls, in collaboration with the Sisters of Charity of Providence and the Ursuline Sisters. It became coeducational in 1937.

A year later, Lucia Sullivan established the "Great Falls Normal School" to educate teachers. At the time there were two schools, each operating under a different Catholic religious community. The union of the two schools was one of convenience and legality. In 1942, the institution was a single entity under the direction of the Sisters of Providence, and was renamed the Great Falls College of Education. By the early 1950s it became simply the "College of Great Falls", and in 1995 was renamed the "University of Great Falls". It was renamed "University of Providence" in July 2017.

Over the years UP has been involved in several outreach education efforts. For many years, it has had a resident center on the Fort Belknap Indian Reservation, and in Lewistown, as well as a continuing education program at Malmstrom Air Force Base. In addition to its campus offerings, UP serves 31 sites in Montana, southern Alberta and Wyoming through its Telecom Distance Learning Program, and is able to serve students around the world. The University of Providence offers undergraduate degrees in more than 20 programs and several master's degree programs.

In 2026, university board of trustees voted to close the school on August 20, 2027. The school cited financial pressures and falling enrollment as reasons for the closure.

== Athletics ==
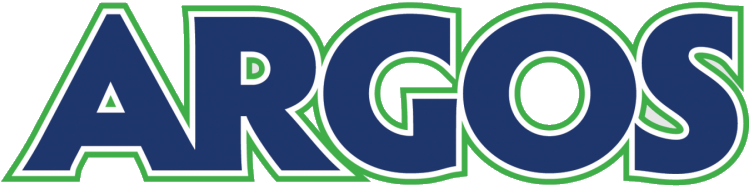
Providence athletics wordmark

The U. of Providence (UP) athletic teams are called the Argonauts. The university is a member of the National Association of Intercollegiate Athletics (NAIA), primarily competing in the Frontier Conference for most of its sports since the 1999–2000 academic year (which they were a member on a previous stint from 1974–75 to 1983–84 before discontinuing its athletics program); while its men's and women's soccer, softball and men's and women's wrestling teams compete in the Cascade Collegiate Conference (CCC).

UP competes in 17 intercollegiate varsity sports: Men's sports include basketball, cross country, golf, ice hockey, soccer, track & field (indoor and outdoor) and wrestling; basketball, cross country, golf, soccer, softball, track & field (indoor and outdoor), volleyball and wrestling; and co-ed sports include the spirit squad.

Former sports include men's lacrosse (until 2019), women's ice hockey (until 2020), and men's and women's rodeo (both until 2021). The men's lacrosse team used to compete in a state rivalry tournament, known as the "Copper Cup", with the University of Montana, and Montana State University.

== Notable alumni ==
- Paul G. Hatfield, judge
- Jon Tester, politician
