= Southwestern Lacrosse Conference =

- Association: Men's Collegiate Lacrosse Association
- Founded: 2008
- President: Matt Holman
- Sports fielded: College Lacrosse
- No. of teams: 21
- Official website: http://mcla.us/SLC/

The Southwestern Lacrosse Conference (SLC) is a lacrosse-only athletic conference affiliated with the Men's Collegiate Lacrosse Association (MCLA). The conference incorporates teams from California and Arizona and is divided into three divisions, Division I, Division II, and Division III.

== History ==
The SLC is formed from original members of the Western Collegiate Lacrosse League which was the largest MCLA conference in the nation at the time. Because of rapid growth and teams spread out over a very large area, the members decided it was best to start a new conference and the SLC was born August 2008 with the blessing of the WCLL and MCLA.

Currently, the SLC has 7 Division I teams, 7 Division II teams and 7 Division III teams. The teams are members of the MCLA and the Division I and Division II conference tournament winners receive an automatic bid to the MCLA National Tournament.

The 2023 season saw the introduction of a Division III component to the conference, comprising community colleges and junior colleges. The 2025 season reorganized divisions 2 and 3 in an attempt to balance the skill level of the teams and establish a division 3 championship. Biola, Cal State Fullerton, UC Irvine, Claremont, and Long Beach State were moved down.

== Teams ==
Institution	Location	Enrollment	Nickname	Tenure	Conference Championships
Division I
University of Arizona	Tucson, Arizona	49,471	Wildcats	2009 - Present	2026
Arizona State University	Tempe, Arizona	77,881	Sun Devils	2009 - Present	2010, 2012, 2013, 2014, 2025
University of California, Los Angeles	Los Angeles, California	47,516	Bruins	2009 - Present	
Chapman University	Orange, California	9,991	Panthers	2009 - Present	2009, 2011, 2016, 2018, 2019, 2023, 2024
Grand Canyon University	Phoenix, Arizona	103,427	Antelopes	2012 - Present	2015, 2017
San Diego State University	San Diego, California	35,732	Aztecs	2009 - Present	
University of Southern California	Los Angeles, California	49,318	Trojans	2009 - Present	2022
Division II
Arizona Christian University	Glendale, Arizona	1,053	Phoenix	2023 - Present	
University of California, San Diego	San Diego, California	41,368	Tritons	2009 - Present	
California State University San Marcos	San Marcos, California	14,503	Cougars	2012 - Present	2022, 2023, 2024, 2025, 2026
Loyola Marymount University	Los Angeles, California	10,184	Lions	2009 - Present	
Northern Arizona University	Flagstaff, Arizona	28,718	Lumberjacks	2013 - Present	2019
University of San Diego	San Diego, California	9,041	Toreros	2009 - Present	
Whittier College	Whittier, California	797	Poets	2026 - Present	
Division III
Biola University	La Mirada, California	5,555	Eagles	2009 - Present	
California State University, Fullerton	Fullerton, California	40,738	Titans	2009 - 2018, 2022 - Present	
California State University, Long Beach	Long Beach, California	39,435	Beach	2009 - 2020, 2023 - Present	2026
University of California, Irvine	Irvine, California	36,505	Anteaters	2009 - Present	
Claremont Colleges	Claremont, California	3,614	Cougars	2009 - Present	
Moorpark College	Moorpark, California	14,357	Raiders	2023 - Present	2025
Santa Barbara City College	Santa Barbara, California	14,646	Vaqueros	2022 - Present	

== Former members ==
Institution	Location	Team Nickname	Tenure	Reason for Departure
California Lutheran University	Thousand Oaks, California	Kingsmen	2009-2013	Ceased operations in 2013
California State University, Channel Islands	Camarillo, California	Dolphins	2010-2021	Ceased operations in 2021
Concordia University Irvine	Irvine, California	Golden Eagles	2009-2023	Moved to NCAA Division II - RMAC
Marymount California University	Rancho Palos Verdes, California	Mariners	2016-2018	Ceased operations in 2018
Occidental College	Los Angeles, California	Tigers	2009-2019	Ceased operations in 2019
Pepperdine University	Malibu, California	Waves	2009-2015	Ceased operations in 2015
Point Loma Nazarene University	San Diego, California	Sea Lions	2022-2023	Ceased operations in 2023
University of California, Santa Barbara	Santa Barbara, California	Gauchos	2009-2019	Moved to MCLA - WCLL Division I
University of Nevada, Las Vegas	Paradise, Nevada	Rebels	2009-2020	Ceased operations in 2020
Westcliff University	Irvine, California	Warriors	2024-2024	Ceased operations in 2024

== Championship Records ==
=== Division I ===
Season	Conference Champion	Runner-up
2009	Chapman	UC Santa Barbara
2010	Arizona State	Chapman
2011	Chapman	Arizona State
2012	Arizona State	Chapman
2013	Arizona State	UC Santa Barbara
2014	Arizona State	Chapman
2015	**Grand Canyon**	Arizona State
2016	**Chapman**	Grand Canyon
2017	**Grand Canyon**	Arizona State
2018	Chapman	Concordia-Irvine
2019	Chapman	Arizona State
2020	No Championship	
2021	No Championship	
2022	Southern California	Grand Canyon
2023	Chapman	**Concordia-Irvine**
2024	Chapman	Arizona
2025	Arizona State	Arizona
2026	Arizona	San Diego State

- Note: Bold text denotes MCLA National Champion
- Note: Italic text denotes MCLA National Champion runner-up

=== Division II ===
Season	Conference Champion	Runner-up
2009	Cal State Fullerton	Cal State Long Beach
2010	Cal State Fullerton	Biola
2011	Cal State Fullerton	Concordia-Irvine
2012	Grand Canyon	Cal State Fullerton
2013	Concordia-Irvine	Cal State Fullerton
2014	Concordia-Irvine	Cal State Fullerton
2015	Concordia-Irvine	Cal State Fullerton
2016	Concordia-Irvine	Cal State Fullerton
2017	**Concordia-Irvine**	Northern Arizona
2018	Cal State Fullerton	Cal State San Marcos
2019	Northern Arizona	UC San Diego
2020	No Championship	
2021	No Championship	
2022	Cal State San Marcos	UC San Diego
2023	Cal State San Marcos	UC San Diego
2024	Cal State San Marcos	UC San Diego
2025	Cal State San Marcos	UC San Diego
2026	Cal State San Marcos	UC San Diego

- Note: Bold text denotes MCLA National Champion
- Note: Italic text denotes MCLA National Champion runner-up

=== Division III ===
Season	Conference Champion	Runner-up
2025	Moorpark	Santa Barbara City College
2026	Long Beach State	Santa Barbara City College
