= Pacific Northwest Collegiate Lacrosse League =

College lacrosse league

- Association: Men's Collegiate Lacrosse Association
- Founded: 1997
- President: Jason Stockton
- Sports fielded: College lacrosse
- No. of teams: 15
- Website: https://mcla.us/PNCLL/

The Pacific Northwest Collegiate Lacrosse League (PNCLL) is a conference in the Men's Collegiate Lacrosse Association. The PNCLL is divided into two divisions, Division I and Division II, and incorporates teams from the U.S. states of Oregon, Washington, Idaho, and Montana, as well as from the Canadian province of British Columbia.

== Current teams ==
Institution	Location	Enrollment	Team nickname	Tenure	Conference championships
Division I
Boise State University	Boise, Idaho	25,830	Broncos	1997 - present	2022, 2025
University of Oregon	Eugene, Oregon	22,257	Ducks	1997 - present	2004, 2005, 2006, 2007, 2010, 2011, 2012, 2017, 2018, 2019
Oregon State University	Corvallis, Oregon	33,193	Beavers	1997 - present	2013, 2015, 2016
Simon Fraser University	Burnaby, British Columbia	26,981	Red Leafs	1997 - present	1997, 1998, 1999, 2000, 2001, 2003, 2008, 2009, 2014, 2023, 2024
University of Washington	Seattle, Washington	52,493	Huskies	1997 - present	2002
Washington State University	Pullman, Washington	29,843	Cougars	1997 - present	
Division II
Central Washington University	Ellensburg, Washington	10,293	Wildcats	2004 - present	
Gonzaga University	Spokane, Washington	5.093	Bulldogs	1997 - 2019, 2024 - present	
College of Idaho	Caldwell, Idaho	1,145	Coyotes	2005 - present	2018, 2019
University of Idaho	Moscow, Idaho	12,383	Vandals	2005 - 2023, 2026–present	
University of Montana	Missoula, Montana	10,106	Grizzlies	1997 - present	2005, 2006, 2007, 2017, 2022, 2023
Pacific Lutheran University	Parkland, Washington	2,706	Lutes	1997 - present	
University of Puget Sound	Tacoma, Washington	2,173	Loggers	1997 - 2018, 2023 - present	2004
Western Oregon University	Monmouth, Oregon	3,320	Wolves	2005 - 2022, 2024 - present	
Western Washington University	Bellingham, Washington	15,125	Vikings	1997 - present	2014, 2015

== Former members ==
Institution	Location	Team nickname	Tenure	Reason for leaving
Evergreen State College	Olympia, Washington	Geoducks	unknown-2005	Defunct in 2005
Lewis and Clark College	Portland, Oregon	Pioneers	1997-2008	Defunct in 2008
Linfield University	McMinnville, Oregon	Wildcats	1997-2007	Defunct in 2007
Multnomah University	Portland, Oregon	Lions	2023-2023	Defunct in 2023
Northwest Nazarene University	Nampa, Idaho	Nighthawks	2021 - 2025	Defunct
Portland State University	Portland, Oregon	Vikings	2009-2018	Defunct in 2019
Southern Oregon University	Ashland, Oregon	Raiders	2005-2022	Moved to MCLA - WCLL Division II
University of Portland	Portland, Oregon	Pilots	2009-2019	Defunct in 2019
University of Providence	Great Falls, Montana	Argonauts	2015-2018	Defunct in 2018
Whitman College	Walla Walla, Washington	Blues	1997-2016	Defunct in 2016
Willamette University	Salem, Oregon	Bearcats	1997-2012	Defunct in 2012

== Past conference champions ==
=== Division I ===
**Division champions**
Year	Champions	Runner-up
1997	Simon Fraser	
1998	Simon Fraser	
1999	Simon Fraser	Western Washington
2000	Simon Fraser	Washington State
2001	Simon Fraser	Western Washington
2002	Washington	Oregon
2003	Simon Fraser	Oregon
2004	Oregon	Simon Fraser
2005	Oregon	Simon Fraser
2006	Oregon	Oregon State
2007	Oregon	Simon Fraser
2008	Simon Fraser	Oregon
2009	Simon Fraser	Oregon
2010	Oregon	Simon Fraser
2011	Oregon	Simon Fraser
2012	Oregon	Simon Fraser
2013	Oregon State	Oregon
2014	Simon Fraser	Oregon
2015	Oregon State	Simon Fraser
2016	Oregon State	Oregon
2017	Oregon	Simon Fraser
2018	Oregon	Simon Fraser
2019	Oregon	Washington
2020	No championship due to COVID-19 pandemic	
2021	No championship due to COVID-19 pandemic	
2022	Boise State	Oregon
2023	Simon Fraser	Oregon
2024	Simon Fraser	Oregon
2025	Boise State	Simon Fraser
2026	Oregon	Boise State

Italic text denotes MCLA national runner-up.
* indicates MCLA runner-up.

Division I records
Team	Championships	Winning years	Runner-ups	Runner-up years
Simon Fraser	11	1997, 1998, 1999, 2000, 2001, 2003, 2008, 2009, 2014, 2023, 2024	10	2004, 2005, 2007, 2010, 2011, 2012, 2015, 2017, 2018, 2025
Oregon	11	2004, 2005, 2006, 2007, 2010, 2011, 2012, 2017, 2018, 2019, 2026	10	2002, 2003, 2008, 2009, 2013, 2014, 2016, 2022, 2023, 2024
Oregon State	3	2013, 2015, 2016		
Boise State	2	2022, 2025	1	2026
Washington	1	2002	1	2019
Western Washington			2	1990, 2001
Washington State			1	2000

=== Division II ===
**Division II champions**
Year	Champions	
2001	Oregon State	
2002	Gonzaga	Linfield
2003	Lewis and Clark College	
2004	Puget Sound	
2005	Montana	
2006	Montana	Western Washington
**2007**	**Montana**	Western Washington
2008	Western Oregon	Western Washington
2009	Western Oregon	Whitman
2010	Western Oregon	Western Washington
2011	Western Oregon	Portland
2012	Western Oregon	Portland
2013	Western Oregon	Portland
2014	Western Washington	Western Oregon
2015	Western Washington	Portland
2016	Southern Oregon	Gonzaga
2017	Montana	College of Idaho
2018	College of Idaho	Montana
2019	College of Idaho	Montana
2020	No championship due to COVID-19 pandemic	
2021	No championship due to COVID-19 pandemic	
2022	Montana	College of Idaho
2023	Montana	Western Washington
2024	Western Washington	Montana
2025	Northwest Nazarene	Montana
2026	College of Idaho	Montana

Bold text denotes MCLA national champion.

Division II records
Team	Championships	Winning years	Runner-ups	Runner-up years
Western Oregon	6	2008, 2009, 2010, 2011, 2012, 2013	1	2014
Montana	6	2005, 2006, **2007**, 2017, 2022, 2023	5	2018, 2019, 2024, 2025, 2026
Western Washington	3	2014, 2015, 2024	5	2006, 2007, 2008, 2010, 2023
College of Idaho	3	2018, 2019, 2026		
Oregon State	1	2001		
Gonzaga	1	2002	1	2016
Lewis and Clark College	1	2003		
Puget Sound	1	2004		
Southern Oregon	1	2016		
Northwest Nazarene	1	2025		
Portland			4	2011, 2012, 2013, 2015
College of Idaho			2	2017, 2022
Linfield			1	2002
Whitman			1	2009

== MCLA All-Americans ==
=== MCLA Division 1 ===
MCLA Division I All-American records
Year	Team	Player	Position	School
2026	Third Team	Oskar Lucas	Attack	Simon Fraser
2026	Third Team	Aaron McCoy	Attack	Oregon
2026	Honorable Mention	Declan Nelson	Defense	Simon Fraser
2026	Honorable Mention	Noah Ruth	Defense	Oregon
2025	Third Team	Colton Altimus	Attack	Boise State
2025	Third Team	Jaxon Bannister	Midfield	Boise State
2025	Honorable Mention	Brendan Murray	Midfield	Simon Fraser
2024	Second Team	Arjan Singh	Defense	Simon Fraser
2024	Honorable Mention	Brendan Murray	Midfield	Simon Fraser
2023	Second Team	Riley Isaacs	Attack	Simon Fraser
2023	Second Team	Arjan Singh	Defense	Simon Fraser
2023	Third Team	Jordan Roberts	Attack	Simon Fraser
2023	Honorable Mention	Glen Mahony	Attack	Washington
2023	Honorable Mention	Alan Gane	Midfield	Simon Fraser
2023	Honorable Mention	Robbie Turpin	DM	Simon Fraser
2023	Honorable Mention	Sean Kriwokon	Defense	Simon Fraser
2022	Second Team	Nick Schirmer	LSM	Oregon State
2022	Honorable Mention	Ryan Henning	Attack	Boise State
2021	No awardees due to COVID-19 pandemic			
2020	No awardees due to COVID-19 pandemic			
2019	Honorable Mention	Nick Gilbert	Midfield	Oregon
2019	Honorable Mention	Mason Hicks	LSM	Simon Fraser
2019	Honorable Mention	Sam Snider	Goalie	Oregon
2019	Honorable Mention	Drew Boyd	Attack	Washington
2019	Honorable Mention	Adam Norgaard	Defense	Washington
2018	First Team	Kaelan Naylor	Midfield	Simon Fraser
2018	Second Team	Matt Peter	Defense	Oregon
2018	Third Team	Cade Baliey	Attack	Oregon
2018	Third Team	Tyler Kirkby	Attack	Simon Fraser
2018	Third Team	Greg Lunde	Attack	Simon Fraser
2018	Honorable Mention	Mackenzie Terrio	Defense	Simon Fraser
2018	Honorable Mention	Nick Gilbert	Midfield	Oregon
2017	Third Team	Cade Baliey	Attack	Oregon
2017	Third Team	Matt Peter	Defense	Oregon
2017	Honorable Mention	Mackenzie Terrio	LSM	Simon Fraser
2017	Honorable Mention	Spencer Rottenburg	Midfield	Oregon State
2017	Honorable Mention	Jannsen Levin	FOS	Oregon State
2017	Honorable Mention	Jeremey Lashar	Goalie	Simon Fraser
2017	Honorable Mention	Mickey Schaefer	SSDM	Oregon State
2016	First Team	Grant Clifford	Attack	Oregon
2016	Second Team	Adam Smith	Attack	Boise State
2016	Third Team	Dylan Roach	Defense	Oregon State
2016	Third Team	Colin Kacinski	Midfield	Oregon State
2016	Third Team	Alex Wilson	Midfield	Boise State
2016	Honorable Mention	John Finegan	Attack	Oregon
2016	Honorable Mention	Tyler Kirkby	Attack	Simon Fraser
2016	Honorable Mention	Michael Marcott	Attack	Oregon
2016	Honorable Mention	Alex Thomson	Defense	Simon Fraser
2016	Honorable Mention	Nick Widmer	Goalie	Oregon State
2016	Honorable Mention	Sean R. Maier	Midfield	Washington
2015	First Team	Sam Clare	Attack	Simon Fraser
2015	Honorable Mention	Adam Smith	Attack	Boise State
2015	Honorable Mention	Lyndon Knuttila	Attack	Simon Fraser
2015	Honorable Mention	Ben Dill	Attack	Oregon State
2015	Honorable Mention	Patrick Tunison	Midfield	Idaho
2015	Honorable Mention	Colin Kacinski	Midfield	Oregon State
2015	Honorable Mention	AJ Vido	LSM	Simon Fraser
2015	Honorable Mention	Dylan Roach	Defense	Oregon State
2015	Honorable Mention	Bayne Bosquet	Defense	Simon Fraser
2015	Honorable Mention	Nick Widmer	Goalie	Oregon State
2015	Honorable Mention	Sayre Thomas	FOS	Boise State
2014	First Team	Sam Clare	Midfield	Simon Fraser
2014	First Team	Riley Wanzer	LSM	Simon Fraser
2014	Second Team	Tyler Kirkby	Attack	Simon Fraser
2014	Honorable Mention	Ward Spence	Attack	Simon Fraser
2014	Honorable Mention	Reed Oliver	Midfield	Oregon State
2014	Honorable Mention	Evan Merritt	Midfield	Oregon
2014	Honorable Mention	Jannsen Levin	FOS	Oregon State
2014	Honorable Mention	Adam Smith	Defensive Specialist	Boise State
2014	Honorable Mention	Hayden McClellan	Defense	Oregon State
2014	Honorable Mention	Mark Hilker	Defense	Simon Fraser
2014	Honorable Mention	Bayne Bosquet	Defense	Simon Fraser
2014	Honorable Mention	Darren Zwack	Goalie	Simon Fraser
2013	First Team	Benjamin Smood	Defense	Oregon
2013	Second Team	Matt Johnson	Attack	Oregon
2013	Second Team	Sam Clare	Midfield	Simon Fraser
2013	Third Team	Eric Ranson	Attack	Simon Fraser
2013	Third Team	Evan Merritt	Midfield	Oregon
2013	Honorable Mention	Ben Dill	Attack	Oregon State
2013	Honorable Mention	Ryan Squires	Attack	Oregon State
2013	Honorable Mention	Riley Wanzer	LSM	Simon Fraser
2013	Honorable Mention	Nick Widmer	Goalie	Oregon State
2012	First Team	Calvin Craig	Attack	Simon Fraser
2012	First Team	Spencer Robertson	Midfield	Oregon
2012	Third Team	Matt Thompson	Attack	Oregon
2012	Third Team	Sam Clare	Midfield	Simon Fraser
2012	Third Team	Benjamin Smood	Defense	Oregon
2012	Honorable Mention	Kevin Kaup	Goalie	Boise State
2011	Second Team	Calvin Craig	Attack	Simon Fraser
2011	Second Team	Spencer Robertson	Midfield	Oregon
2011	Second Team	Mike Gerrard	Defense	Oregon
2011	Third Team	Kevin Clark	Midfield	Oregon
2011	Third Team	Luke Genereux	Defense	Simon Fraser
2011	Honorable Mention	Colton Dow	Attack	Simon Fraser
2011	Honorable Mention	Eric Ransom	Midfield	Simon Fraser
2011	Honorable Mention	Nick Johnston	Goalie	Oregon
2010	Second Team	Russell Thomas	Midfield	Simon Fraser
2010	Third Team	Adam Foss	Attack	Simon Fraser
2010	Third Team	Ben Towner	Attack	Simon Fraser
2010	Third Team	Nick Johnston	Goalie	Oregon
2010	Honorable Mention	Nathan Clare	Defense	Simon Fraser
2010	Honorable Mention	Luke Genereux	Defense	Simon Fraser
2010	Honorable Mention	Kevin Clark	Goalie	Oregon
2009	First Team	Ben Towner	Attack	Simon Fraser
2009	First Team	Russell Thomas	Midfield	Simon Fraser
2009	Second Team	Adam Foss	Attack	Simon Fraser
2009	Second Team	John Matusiefsky	Midfield	Oregon
2009	Second Team	Curtis Manning	LSM	Simon Fraser
2009	Second Team	Ben Johnson	FOS	Simon Fraser
2009	Third Team	Joe Cramer	Midfield	Washington
2009	Honorable Mention	Matthew Miyashita	Defense	Simon Fraser
2008	First Team	Ben Towner	Attack	Simon Fraser
2008	First Team	Russell Thomas	Midfield	Simon Fraser
2008	First Team	Curtis Manning	Defensive Specialist	Simon Fraser
2008	Third Team	Townsend Hall	Midfield	Montana
2008	Third Team	Andrew Vincent	Defense	Oregon
2008	Honorable Mention	Justin Blackmore	Attack	Oregon
2008	Honorable Mention	Tucker Sargent	FOS	Montana
2007	First Team	Julian Coffman	Attack	Oregon
2007	First Team	Trevor Tesar	Midfield	Oregon
2007	First Team	Scott Miller	FOS	Oregon
2007	Second Team	Todd Jolly	Defense	Oregon
2007	Second Team	Mike L Christians	Midfield	Simon Fraser
2006	Second Team	Julian Coffman	Attack	Oregon
2006	Third Team	Scott Miller	FOS	Oregon
2006	Third Team	Matt Connors	Midfield	Oregon
2006	Honorable Mention	Curtis D Manning	Attack	Simon Fraser
2006	Honorable Mention	Aaron Pascas	Goalie	Simon Fraser
2006	Honorable Mention	Steve Carpenter	Defense	Oregon State
2005	Second Team	Eric Weitz	Midfield	Washington
2005	Third Team	Jeremy Tesar	Defense	Oregon
2005	Honorable Mention	Julian Coffman	Attack	Oregon
2005	Honorable Mention	Richard D Kladis	Attack	Gonzaga
2005	Honorable Mention	Aaron Pascas	Goalie	Simon Fraser
2005	Honorable Mention	Danny Ernst	Midfield	Oregon

MCLA Division I All-American records by school
School	First team	Second team	Third team	Honorable mention	Total
Simon Fraser	10	11	9	28	58
Oregon	6	7	13	12	38
Oregon State		1	2	15	18
Boise State		1	3	5	9
Washington		1	1	4	6
Montana			1	1	2
Gonzaga				1	1
Idaho				1	1
Total	16	21	29	67	133

=== MCLA Division 2 ===
MCLA Division I All-American records
Year	Team	Player	Position	School
2026	First Team	Grayson Flatten	Attack	College of Idaho
2026	First Team	Wyatt Neu	Midfield	College of Idaho
2026	First Team	Alex Weider	Defense	Montana
2026	First Team	Joey Cortner	Goalie	Montana
2026	Second Team	Trevor Shoopman	Attack	College of Idaho
2026	Second Team	Parker Allumbaugh	SSDM	College of Idaho
2026	Third Team	Kian Maestretti	Midfield	Western Washington
2026	Third Team	Eli Longstreet	Defense	College of Idaho
2026	Third Team	Carter Pechin	Defense	College of Idaho
2026	Third Team	Brogan Rice	Goalie	College of Idaho
2026	Honorable Mention	Sully Kroeger	Attack	Montana
2026	Honorable Mention	Reece Baron	Attack	Montana
2026	Honorable Mention	Reece McIntosh	SSDM	Montana
2026	Honorable Mention	Noah Geise	FOS	College of Idaho
2026	Honorable Mention	Mason Slapper	LSM	Montana
2026	Honorable Mention	Alex Heck	Defense	Montana
2025	First Team	Keaton Bean	Attack	Northwest Nazarene
2025	First Team	Loy Howard	Midfield	Northwest Nazarene
2025	First Team	Rayce Neill	FOS	Northwest Nazarene
2025	Second Team	Miles Hess	Attack	Montana
2025	Third Team	Colton Safley	Defense	Northwest Nazarene
2025	Third Team	Joey Cortner	Goalie	Montana
2025	Honorable Mention	Bodie Jones	Attack	Northwest Nazarene
2025	Honorable Mention	Wyatt Neu	Midfield	College of Idaho
2025	Honorable Mention	Paul O'Neill	Midfield	College of Idaho
2025	Honorable Mention	Alex Weider	Defense	Montana
2025	Honorable Mention	Mason Slapper	LSM	Montana
2024	First Team	Loy Howard	Midfield	Northwest Nazarene
2024	First Team	Rayce Neill	FOS	Northwest Nazarene
2024	Second Team	Keaton Bean	Attack	Northwest Nazarene
2024	Second Team	Paul O'Neill	Midfield	College of Idaho
2024	Second Team	Carson Burrill	Defense	Montana
2024	Second Team	Mason Slapper	Defense	Montana
2024	Honorable Mention	Peter Curran	Attack	Montana
2024	Honorable Mention	Bodie Jones	Attack	Northwest Nazarene
2024	Honorable Mention	Hunter Heaston	Goalie	Montana
2024	Honorable Mention	Alex Heck	LSM	Montana
2023	First Team	Justin Renk	Defense	Montana
2023	Second Team	Miles Hess	Attack	Montana
2023	Second Team	Preston Stewart	Midfield	Montana
2023	Third Team	Low Howard	Midfield	College of Idaho
2023	Third Team	Carson Burril	Defense	Montana
2023	Honorable Mention	Reese Baron	Attack	Montana
2023	Honorable Mention	Peter Curran	Midfield	Montana
2023	Honorable Mention	Brody Stephens	Midfield	Montana
2023	Honorable Mention	Henry Hancock	SSDM	Montana
2023	Honorable Mention	Mason Slapper	LSM	Montana
2023	Honorable Mention	Van Goyen	Defense	College of Idaho
2022	First Team	Casey Davies	Attack	College of Idaho
2022	First Team	Daniel Skelton	LSM	College of Idaho
2022	Second Team	Carson Burrill	Defense	Montana
2021	No awardees due to COVID-19 pandemic			
2020	No awardees due to COVID-19 pandemic			
2019	First Team	Casey Davies	Attack	College of Idaho
2019	First Team	Nolan Davis	Defense	Montana
2019	First Team	Henry Ontiveros	FOS	College of Idaho
2019	Second Team	Aidan Larson	Attack	Montana
2019	Second Team	Bradley Stewart	Defense	College of Idaho
2019	Third Team	Ryan Henning	Attack	College of Idaho
2019	Third Team	Jonathan Williams	Midfield	Western Oregon
2019	Honorable Mention	Eric Mott	Defense	Montana
2019	Honorable Mention	Andrew Moesel	Goalie	Montana
2018	First Team	Nicholas Guzzetti	Attack	College of Idaho
2018	Third Team	John Bear Bowen	Defense	Montana
2018	Third Team	Cory Brady	Midfield	College of Idaho
2018	Honorable Mention	Benjamin Cole	Attack	Western Washington
2018	Honorable Mention	Nolan Davis	SSDM	Montana
2018	Honorable Mention	Seamus Clancy	LSM	Montana
2017	Third Team	Eric Larson	Attack	Montana
2017	Honorable Mention	Nicholas Guzzetti	Attack	College of Idaho
2017	Honorable Mention	Harley Humphrey	FOS	Southern Oregon
2017	Honorable Mention	Jaden Carson	Midfield	College of Idaho
2017	Honorable Mention	Chase Clark	Defense	Providence
2017	Honorable Mention	Taylor Harrison	LSM	Southern Oregon
2017	Honorable Mention	Cory Brady	SSDM	College of Idaho
2016	Third Team	Dange Wolf	Midfield	Western Oregon
2016	Honorable Mention	Nicholas Guzzetti	Attack	College of Idaho
2016	Honorable Mention	Taylor Harrison	LSM	Southern Oregon
2016	Honorable Mention	Kurt Pohs	SSDM	Portland
2016	Honorable Mention	Connor Kelley	Goalie	Southern Oregon
2016	Honorable Mention	Joe Finnell	Midfield	Western Washington
2016	Honorable Mention	Weston Gotuzzo	Midfield	Portland State
2015	First Team	Michael Hatcher	Midfield	Western Washington
2015	Second Team	Jordan Johnson	Goalie	Western Washington
2015	Third Team	Jacob Goodman	Attack	Western Washington
2015	Third Team	Austin Richert	Defense	Western Washington
2015	Honorable Mention	Jordan Foster	Attack	Western Washington
2015	Honorable Mention	Nicholas Guzzetti	Attack	College of Idaho
2015	Honorable Mention	Madison Pihl	Attack	Portland
2015	Honorable Mention	Taylor Harrison	LSM	Southern Oregon
2015	Honorable Mention	Griffin Caster	Defense	Western Oregon
2015	Honorable Mention	Aidan McDonald	Defense	Puget Sound
2015	Honorable Mention	Alex Smith	FOS	Southern Oregon
2015	Honorable Mention	Chris Timm	Midfield	Portland
2015	Honorable Mention	Dange Wolf	Midfield	Western Oregon
2014	Second Team	Jacob Bohince	Attack	Western Oregon
2014	Second Team	Tyler Preston	FOS	Western Oregon
2014	Second Team	Clement Signoretty	Defense	Western Washington
2014	Second Team	Taylor Dougan	Midfield	Western Oregon
2014	Honorable Mention	Jacob Goodman	Attack	Western Washington
2014	Honorable Mention	Tom Halley	Attack	Southern Oregon
2014	Honorable Mention	Clay Malensek	Attack	Western Oregon
2014	Honorable Mention	Alex Bus	Defense	Western Washington
2014	Honorable Mention	Matt Kegel	Defense	Southern Oregon
2014	Honorable Mention	Michael Hatcher	Midfield	Western Washington
2014	Honorable Mention	Chris Timm	Midfield	Portland
2013	Second Team	Ian McAnnis-Entenman	Attack	Portland
2013	Third Team	Logan Marks	Defense	Western Oregon
2013	Third Team	Jacob Bohince	Midfield	Western Oregon
2013	Honorable Mention	Jacob Goodman	Attack	Western Washington
2013	Honorable Mention	Kevin Weigand	Attack	Gonzaga
2013	Honorable Mention	Austin Mendiola	Midfield	College of Idaho
2013	Honorable Mention	Chris Timm	Midfield	Portland
2013	Honorable Mention	Charles G Goodman	Defense	Western Washington
2013	Honorable Mention	Mike Henry	Goalie	Portland
2012	Third Team	Matt Frutgier	Defense	Western Oregon
2012	Honorable Mention	Jacob Goodman	Attack	Western Washington
2012	Honorable Mention	Sam Hilder	Attack	Gonzaga
2012	Honorable Mention	Tyler Mills	LSM	Portland
2012	Honorable Mention	Miles R Fanning	Defense	Western Washington
2012	Honorable Mention	Mike Henry	Goalie	Portland
2012	Honorable Mention	Colin D Gaddy	Midfield	Western Washington
2011	First Team	Ian Bohince	Midfield	Western Oregon
2011	Second Team	Jacob Bohince	Midfield	Western Oregon
2011	Third Team	Matt Frutiger	Defensive Midfield	Western Oregon
2011	Honorable Mention	Ian McAnnis-Entenman	Attack	Willamette
2011	Honorable Mention	Colin Gaddy	Midfield	Western Washington
2011	Honorable Mention	John Pfieffer	Defense	Southern Oregon
2011	Honorable Mention	Greg Fredlund	Goalie	Pacific Lutheran
2011	Honorable Mention	Carter Boggess	Goalie	Southern Oregon
2010	Second Team	Ian Bohince	Midfield	Western Oregon
2010	Third Team	Calvin Davis	Attack	Western Oregon
2010	Third Team	Adam Extine	Defense	Western Washington
2010	Honorable Mention	Greg Fredlund	Goalie	Pacific Lutheran
2009	First Team	Nicholas Tkachuck	Attack	Pacific Lutheran
2009	Second Team	Sunn Kim	Attack	Whitman College
2009	Second Team	Adam Extine	Defense	Western Washington
2009	Third Team	Calvin Davis	Attack	Western Oregon
2009	Third Team	Justin Brown	Defense	Western Oregon
2009	Honorable Mention	Matt Frutiger	Midfield	Western Oregon
2009	Honorable Mention	Alex White	Attack	Southern Oregon
2008	First Team	Kyle McWhirter	Midfield	Western Oregon
2008	First Team	Dan Snell	Defense	Southern Oregon
2008	Second Team	Ian Bohince	FOS	Western Oregon
2008	Second Team	Nicholas Tkachuk	Attack	Pacific Lutheran
2008	Third Team	Reid Petit	Attack	Puget Sound
2008	Third Team	Alex White	Attack	Southern Oregon
2008	Third Team	Adam Extine	Defense	Western Washington
2007	First Team	Townsend Hall	Attack	Montana
2007	First Team	John H Healy	Attack	Western Washington
2007	First Team	Colin A Connery	Goalie	Montana
2007	First Team	Matthew C Wuerffel	LSM	Pacific Lutheran
2007	Second Team	Dan P Snell	Defense	Southern Oregon
2007	Second Team	Noah C Symington	Goalie	Western Washington
2007	Second Team	Travis S McCarthy	FOS	Montana
2007	Second Team	Jake C Schuit	Midfield	Western Washington
2007	Third Team	Sam Cameron	Attack	Montana
2007	Third Team	Cody J Hart	Attack	College of Idaho
2005	Third Team	Benjamin R Sadler	Attack	Whitman College
2005	Third Team	Ryan F Frey	Defense	Montana
2005	Third Team	Bret Bartell	Goalie	Pacific Lutheran
2005	Third Team	Peter B Bonoff	LSM	Western Washington
2005	Honorable Mention	Taylor Brennan	Attack	Linfield College
2005	Honorable Mention	Townsend Hall	Attack	Montana
2005	Honorable Mention	Jim P Baustark	Defense	Western Washington
2005	Honorable Mention	Jeff Roark	Defense	Pacific Lutheran
2005	Honorable Mention	Gilbert M Tompson	Goalie	Montana
2005	Honorable Mention	Matthew B Kennedy	Midfield	Pacific Lutheran

MCLA Division II All-American records by school
School	First team	Second team	Third team	Honorable mention	Total
Montana	6	8	6	21	41
College of Idaho	7	4	7	10	28
Western Oregon	2	5	5	13	25
Western Washington	2	6	10	4	22
Southern Oregon	1	1	1	11	14
Northwest Nazarene	5	1	1	2	9
Pacific Lutheran	2	1	1	4	8
Whitman College		1	1		2
Puget Sound			1	1	2
Portland			1	1	2
Linfield College				1	1
Willamette				1	1
Portland State				1	1
Providence				1	1
Total	25	27	34	71	157
