= Maritime University Field Lacrosse League =

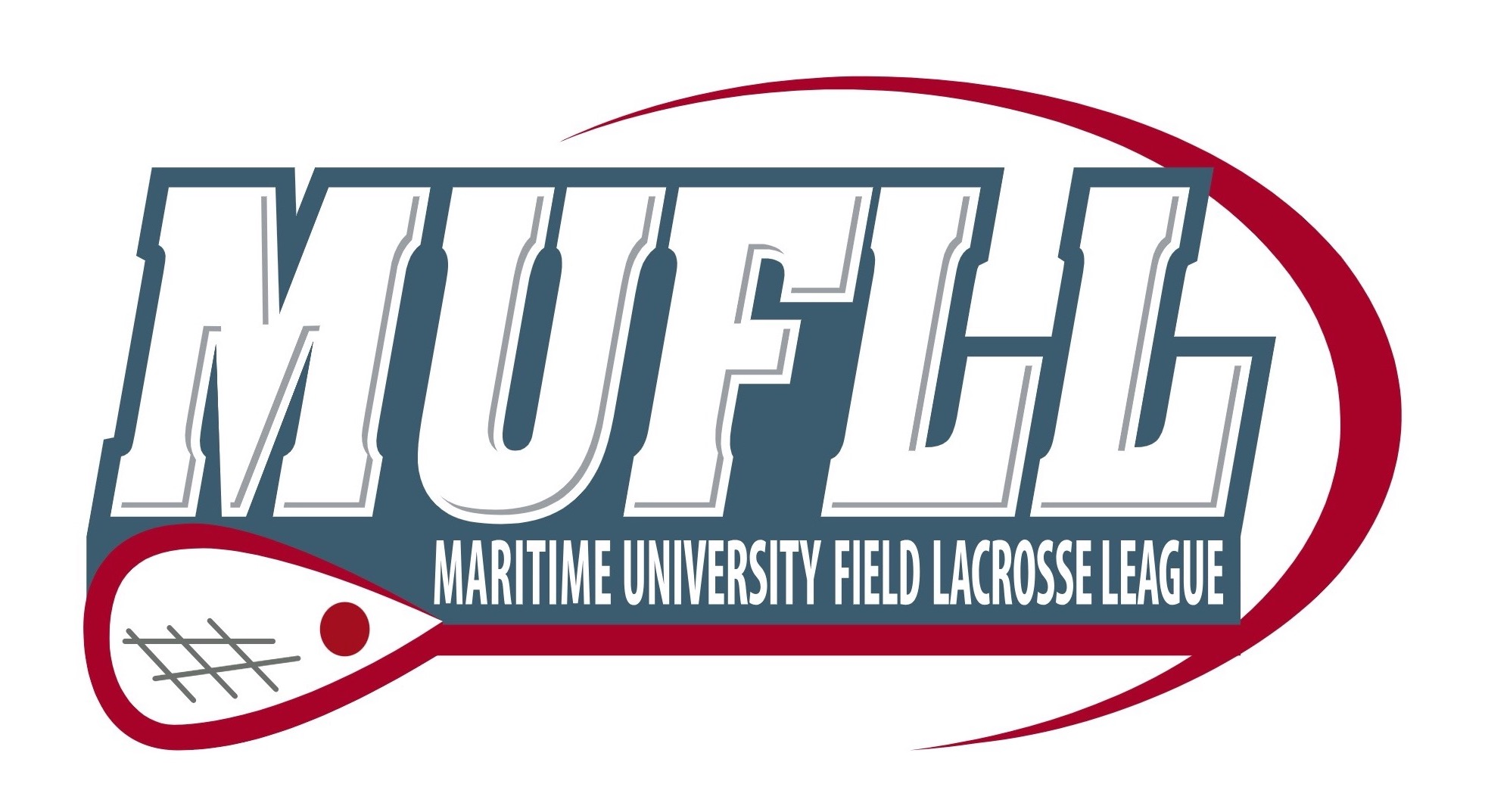
- Sport: Field lacrosse
- Founded: 2005
- Commissioner: Gus Doane
- No. of teams: 6
- Country: Canada
- Most recent champion: St. Francis Xavier X-Men (2026)
- Most titles: Dalhousie Tigers (16)
- Website: mufll.ca

The Maritime University Field Lacrosse League (MUFLL) is an association of men's field lacrosse teams connected with universities in New Brunswick, Nova Scotia and Prince Edward Island. Teams compete in the fall with league playoffs typically in early November. Established in 2005, the MUFLL currently has six member schools competing.

== Teams ==
School	Location	Head coach
Acadia University	Wolfville, Nova Scotia	Jonah Bowie
Dalhousie University	Halifax, Nova Scotia	Zak Raymond
Mount Allison University	Sackville, New Brunswick	Mitch Hannigan
St. Francis Xavier University	Antigonish, Nova Scotia	Jacob Abbott
Saint Mary's University	Halifax, Nova Scotia	Jon Goguen
University of Prince Edward Island	Charlottetown, Prince Edward Island	Nathan Bailey

=== Former teams ===
- University of New Brunswick (2006-2009, 2014-2025)

== Champions ==
The Telus Cup is a Canadian university field lacrosse championship, awarded annually to the winner of the post-season tournament by the Maritime University Field Lacrosse League. The Telus Cup tournament is typically held the first weekend in November, and is hosted by one of the member schools.

As of 2026, 21 MUFLL tournaments have been held (not held in 2020). In that span three teams - Dalhousie, St. Francis Xavier, and Saint Mary's - have won the title, Dalhousie leading with sixteen titles.

Year	Winner	Runner-up	Score	Location
2005	Dalhousie Tigers	St. Francis Xavier X-Men	5-4	Antigonish, NS
2006	St. Francis Xavier X-Men	Dalhousie Tigers	10-6	Wolfville, NS
2007	St. Francis Xavier X-Men	Dalhousie Tigers	10-6	Halifax, NS
2008	Dalhousie Tigers	St. Francis Xavier X-Men	13-11	Halifax, NS
2009	Dalhousie Tigers	St. Francis Xavier X-Men	8-6	Wolfville, NS
2010	Saint Mary's Huskies	Dalhousie Tigers	11-9	Halifax, NS
2011	Dalhousie Tigers	St. Francis Xavier X-Men	13-4	Halifax, NS
2012	Dalhousie Tigers	St. Francis Xavier X-Men	20-7	Halifax, NS
2013	Dalhousie Tigers	St. Francis Xavier X-Men	17-10	Halifax, NS
2014	Dalhousie Tigers	St. Francis Xavier X-Men	15-9	Halifax, NS
2015	Dalhousie Tigers	St. Francis Xavier X-Men	16-7	Antigonish, NS
2016	Dalhousie Tigers	St. Francis Xavier X-Men	24-11	Halifax, NS
2017	Dalhousie Tigers	Saint Mary's Huskies	11-5	Halifax, NS
2018	Dalhousie Tigers	St. Francis Xavier X-Men	10-5	Halifax, NS
2019	Dalhousie Tigers	St. Francis Xavier X-Men	11-4	Halifax, NS
2021	Dalhousie Tigers	St. Francis Xavier X-Men	11-3	Halifax, NS
2022	Dalhousie Tigers	St. Francis Xavier X-Men	7-4	Halifax, NS
2023	Dalhousie Tigers	Saint Mary's Huskies	15-5	Halifax, NS
2024	Dalhousie Tigers	St. Francis Xavier X-Men	8-6	Sackville, NB
2025	St. Francis Xavier X-Men	Dalhousie Tigers	11-5	Sackville, NB
2026	St. Francis Xavier X-Men	Dalhousie Tigers	14-13 (OT)	Halifax, NS

== Records & statistics ==
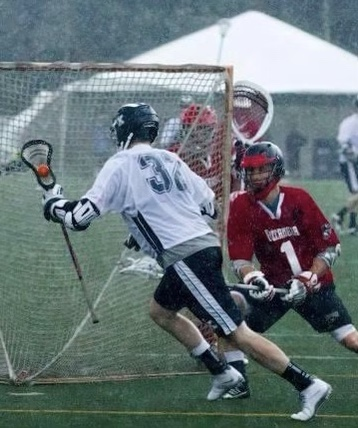
Ian McShane is the all-time top scorer in MUFLL history with 193 goals

MUFLL all-time top scorer is Ian McShane with 193 goals, 181 of them with the St. Francis Xavier X-Men after transferring from Mount Allison University following the 2011 season. He also holds the record for most goals scored in a single season with 60 in the 2014 campaign, and is the only player ever to win the league's Top Scorer Award in two individual seasons. McShane is the sole player in MUFLL history to be awarded back-to-back league MVP accolades. Saint Mary's Tyler Leeming also received the award twice in his career.

The Dalhousie Tigers hold the record for the longest winning streak in collegiate lacrosse history, winning 134 consecutive games from 2012-2025.

=== All-time top scorers ===
Bold shows players still active.

Rank	Player	GP	G	A	P	Team(s)
1	Ian McShane	48	193	39	232	Mount Allison Mounties, St. Francis Xavier X-Men
2	Jimmy Shea	52	160	46	206	St. Francis Xavier X-Men
3	Duane Davis	42	150	20	170	Dalhousie Tigers
4	Ricky Canning	52	139	21	160	Dalhousie Tigers
5	Paddy Quinn	53	131	14	145	Dalhousie Tigers
6	Spencer Gallant	36	130	36	166	Saint Mary's Huskies
7	Jamie Dunbar	52	127	21	148	Dalhousie Tigers
8	Drew MacDonald	50	127	1	128	St. Francis Xavier X-Men, Dalhousie Tigers
9	Tyler Leeming	42	115	33	148	Saint Mary's Huskies
10	Connor Clarkson	44	114	54	168	St. Francis Xavier X-Men
11	Hunter Thompson	58	101	7	108	Saint Mary's Huskies
12	Blake MacDonald	38	99	23	122	St. Francis Xavier X-Men, Saint Mary's Huskies
13	Matthew Wilson	37	98	35	133	Dalhousie Tigers
14	Bryson Goodman	27	97	10	107	St. Francis Xavier X-Men
15	Alex Miller	40	90	17	107	UNB Reds
16	Liam MacIntosh	37	90	15	105	Dalhousie Tigers
17	Jesse Magarvey	49	90	11	101	Mount Allison Mounties, Saint Mary's Huskies
18	David Gagnier	47	79	44	123	Dalhousie Tigers
19	Zane Fletcher	35	77	10	87	Dalhousie Tigers
20	Dan Michel	21	72	9	81	Saint Mary's Huskies
21	Wayne Crossman	40	71	22	93	Mount Allison Mounties
22	Louis Martin	51	70	24	94	Dalhousie Tigers
23	Ben Baxter	36	69	10	79	Saint Mary's Huskies
24	Kevin Isherwood	20	64	16	80	Mount Allison Mounties
25	Jake Piper	40	63	3	66	Dalhousie Tigers
26	**Nate Santarpia**	51	62	10	72	Dalhousie Tigers
27	Phil Elford	35	61	9	70	Saint Mary's Huskies
28	Wes Gardner	30	61	8	69	Dalhousie Tigers
29	Austin Hirschfeld	55	60	21	81	UNB Reds
30	Zachary Dunseith	40	59	8	67	UNB Reds
31	**Dylan Ferrier**	18	59	2	61	Dalhousie Tigers
32	Kale Gordon	39	57	18	75	St. Francis Xavier X-Men
33	**Jacob Goobie**	41	56	9	65	Saint Mary's Huskies
34	John-David Todd	45	56	2	58	Saint Mary's Huskies
35	Brett McGuire	32	55	8	63	Dalhousie Tigers
36	Ian Higgins	29	54	35	89	Saint Mary's Huskies
37	**Jett Taylor**	31	54	31	85	St. Francis Xavier X-Men
38	Adam Gallop	18	53	3	56	UNB Reds
39	Ben Mills	25	52	26	78	St. Francis Xavier X-Men
40	Aidan Scott	29	52	6	58	Saint Mary's Huskies
41	**Joe Webster**	52	50	15	65	Mount Allison Mounties
42	Rob Diamond	28	49	8	57	St. Francis Xavier X-Men
43	Lucas Mazer	47	48	15	63	Dalhousie Tigers
44	**Will Mix**	59	48	13	61	UPEI Panthers, Saint Mary's Huskies
45	Cody Carta-Bomersine	25	47	9	56	Dalhousie Tigers
46	David Carson	48	46	10	56	Mount Allison Mounties
47	Gregg Nussey	42	45	8	53	St. Francis Xavier X-Men
48	Owen Cox	21	45	2	47	Saint Mary's Huskies
49	Payton Tasse	29	44	20	64	St. Francis Xavier X-Men
50	Chris Foran	36	44	13	57	St. Francis Xavier X-Men

As of November 2026.

=== Top scorers by team ===
Player	Team	GP	G	A	P
Jonah Bowie	Acadia Axemen	11	23	3	26
Duane Davis	Dalhousie Tigers	42	150	20	170
Wayne Crossman	Mount Allison Mounties	40	71	22	93
Spencer Gallant	Saint Mary's Huskies	36	130	36	166
Ian McShane	St. Francis Xavier X-Men	40	181	39	220
Alex Miller	UNB Reds	40	90	17	107
Connor MacInnis	UPEI Panthers	37	44	3	47
