= Backyard Brawl =

College sports rivalry

- Logo for the 2022 football game

- Pittsburgh Panthers West Virginia Mountaineers
- Sport: Multiple
- First meeting: 1895 (football)

Locations of Pittsburgh and West Virginia

The Backyard Brawl is the name given to the Pittsburgh–West Virginia rivalry. It is an American college sports rivalry between the University of Pittsburgh Panthers and the West Virginia University Mountaineers. While historically a rivalry between the two schools' football programs, the term "Backyard Brawl" has also been used to refer to college basketball games played annually or semi-annually and may also be used to refer to other athletic competitions between the two schools. It is a registered trademark for both universities, and refers to the close proximity of the two universities, separated by 75 miles (105 km) along Interstate 79. The football rivalry is the 14th oldest in the United States and is typically shown on national television. In the past, the Backyard Brawl has been seen on ABC, CBS, ESPN, and ESPN2.

Sport	Leader	Record
Football	Pittsburgh	63–42–3
Men's Basketball	West Virginia	102–90
Women's Basketball	West Virginia	30–19
Baseball	West Virginia	122–93
Men's Soccer	West Virginia	35–11–5
Women's Soccer	West Virginia	13–2–1

== History ==
The football series was first played in 1895, and the game has historically been one of the more intense rivalries in the eastern United States. The rivalry between the two schools is due mainly to proximity. WVU's campus in Morgantown, West Virginia, is only about 70 miles south of Pittsburgh (via Interstate 79), and the two schools often compete for the same recruits.

The 1921 edition of the Backyard Brawl was the first college football game broadcast on the radio when Harold W. Arlin announced the 21–13 Pittsburgh victory on KDKA.

From 1962 to 2011, the series alternated between Pittsburgh and Morgantown on a yearly basis. Before that, the games were held in Pittsburgh on an almost regular basis, with Morgantown occasionally hosting the game. At one point, Pittsburgh hosted the game 11 consecutive years (1919–29) and also hosted eight straight contests between 1938 and 1948. (There were no matchups from 1940 to 1942.) In contrast, the most consecutive games West Virginia has hosted were four consecutive from 1895 to 1901, with one of those games held in Fairmont, West Virginia, now the home to Fairmont State University, and one in Wheeling, West Virginia. The most consecutive games played in Morgantown, three, were held from 1932 to 1934.

West Virginia started out the series leading, 5–1. Pittsburgh won four consecutive games from 1904 to 1908 (there was no game played in 1905) to tie the series at 5–5. In 1909, the teams played to a 0–0 tie, making the series 5–5–1. The following year, Pittsburgh won 38–0, taking a 6–5–1 lead in the series, and has led ever since. Since the series began interchanging annually between Morgantown and Pittsburgh in 1963, the Mountaineers have held a 25–22–2 advantage over the Panthers.

Starting in 1904, the schools were considered as part of the "tri-state district Big Three" alongside Penn State and competed for the "district Big Three championship" annually, a distinction earned by attaining the best record against the other two. This became an annual round-robin and in 1951 the Old Ironsides Trophy was introduced and awarded to the champion of the three. The trio played annually until West Virginia won its second outright title in 1984 and Penn State was unable to locate the trophy. With the loss of the trophy and deregionalization of college football, the three-team rivalry increasingly became three distinct head-to-head matchups with little to no connection.

On November 25, 2004, the Backyard Brawl series saw its 97th game, surpassing the 96–game Penn State–Pittsburgh football rivalry as Pittsburgh's most–played rivalry game. Pittsburgh celebrated the event with a 16–13 win at Heinz Field.

On December 1, 2007, the 100th Backyard Brawl took place. Pittsburgh upset WVU by a score of 13–9. Coming into the game, WVU was ranked first in the Coaches' Poll and second in both the BCS and AP Poll. The loss cost WVU a chance to play for a national title in the 2008 BCS National Championship Game.

The Mountaineers and the Panthers wore Nike Pro Combat System of Dress, uniforms designed to pay respect to Pittsburgh's steel industry and West Virginia's coal mining industry, for the 2010 Backyard Brawl. According to the Pittsburgh Tribune Review, West Virginia wore a shade of white "that looks as if it has a fine layer of dust on the jersey" and has accents in university gold that "references the canaries used long ago to test toxicity in mines." The helmet has a thin yellow line, designed to look like "the beam of light emitted by a miner's headlamp." Meanwhile, Pitt wore smoky college navy and black jerseys and pants with metallic team gold numerals "to represent the brilliant glow of a blast furnace," according to a Nike website, and matching helmets with a gold stripe and logo "evocative of steel I-beams" and resembling a hard hat. West Virginia won the game in Pittsburgh 35–10.

On September 18, 2011, Pittsburgh announced its departure from the Big East and was introduced as a member of the Atlantic Coast Conference (ACC). A month later, on October 28, West Virginia accepted an invitation to join the Big 12. With both universities now in different conferences, the Backyard Brawl was put on hiatus. The 2012 college football season marked the first time since 1943 that the rivalry was not played in football, breaking a streak of 68 consecutive meetings.

In September 2015, both universities agreed to a four-game series running from 2022 to 2025. In April 2022, both universities announced the addition of four more games from 2029 to 2032.

== Football ==
Pittsburgh–West Virginia football rivalry
- Teams: Pittsburgh Panthers; West Virginia Mountaineers
- First meeting: October 26, 1895; West Virginia, 8–0
- Latest meeting: September 13, 2025; West Virginia, 31–24^{OT}
- Next meeting: September 8, 2029

Statistics
- Total meetings: 108
- All-time record: Pittsburgh leads, 63–42–3
- Largest victory: November 8, 1904; Pittsburgh, 53–0
- Longest win streak: Pittsburgh, 15 (1929–1946)
- Current win streak: West Virginia, 1 (2025–present)

=== Location ===
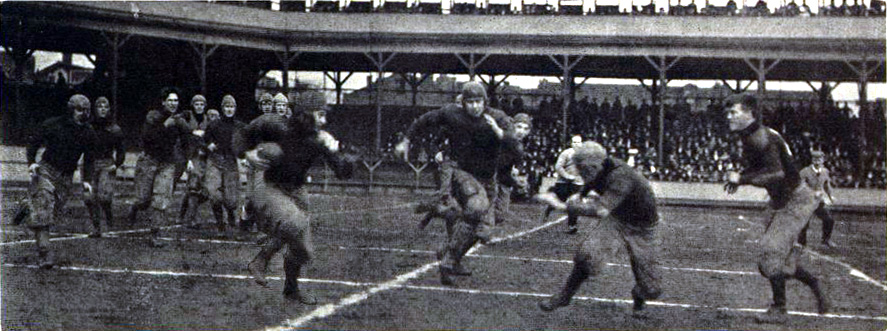
The 1908 edition of the Backyard Brawl at Exposition Park

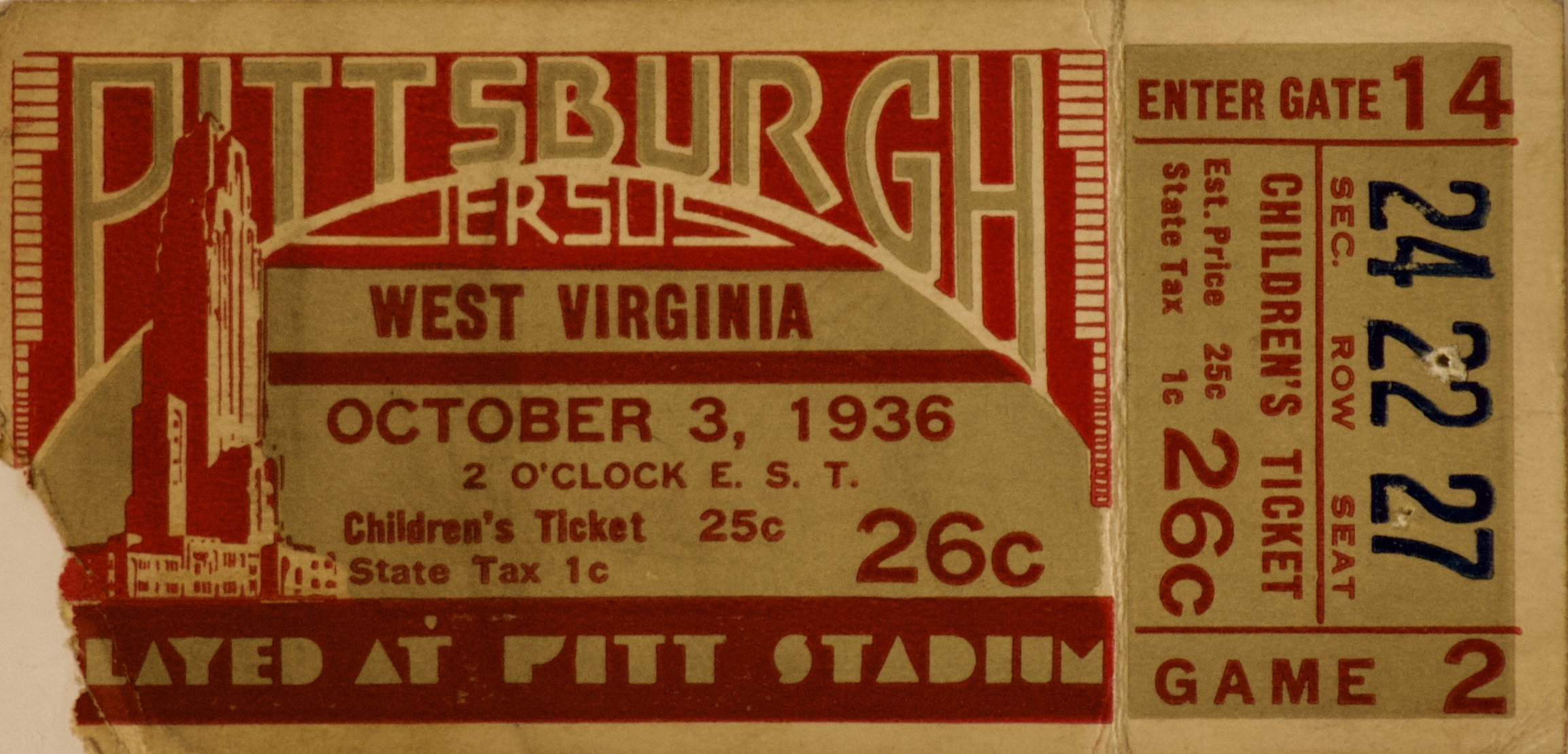
Ticket stub for the game on October 3, 1936, at Pitt Stadium

The location of the Backyard Brawl has varied much throughout its history. The very first football game took place in Wheeling, West Virginia, in 1895. The next meeting, in 1898, was held in Fairmont, a short distance south of Morgantown. The third and fourth contests were held in Morgantown. The year 1902 marked the first time the game was held in Pittsburgh, at Exposition Park, the North Shore home of the Pittsburgh Pirates. 1910 was the first time the Backyard Brawl was held on the Pittsburgh campus, at brand-new Forbes Field. The series was held here for eight of the next nine years, until the opening of Pitt Stadium in 1925 on the opposite end of the University of Pittsburgh campus. Pitt Stadium hosted 5 straight games, until in 1930, the Backyard Brawl found itself at yet another new location, Mountaineer Field, which had opened in 1924 on the campus of West Virginia University. Another change in location occurred in 1981, when the game was played at a new Mountaineer Field in Morgantown. In 1998 and 2000, the game was played at Three Rivers Stadium. The most recent change took place in 2002, when the Backyard Brawl was played for the first time at Heinz Field (now called Acrisure Stadium), the new, full-time home of the Panthers, a year after it was opened.

=== Notable games ===
- 1895: In the schools' first meeting, West Virginia beat then-Western University of Pennsylvania, 8–0. Western had yet to become the University of Pittsburgh. Of West Virginia's four "home" games that season, it was the only one played in Morgantown. The others were played in Parkersburg, Wheeling and Charleston.
- 1921: The 1921 edition of the Backyard Brawl was the first college football game broadcast on the radio when Harold W. Arlin announced the 21–13 Pittsburgh victory on KDKA.
- 1952: West Virginia recorded its first-ever victory over a ranked team when the unranked Mountaineers knocked off 18th-rated Pitt in Pittsburgh.
- 1955: West Virginia was an undefeated 7-0 going into the game, but Pitt never trailed after an early touchdown catch by Joe Walton, who later coached the New York Jets. Pitt's win is credited with knocking WVU out of contention for the Sugar Bowl.
- 1961: West Virginia's victory at Pitt in 1961 became known as the “Garbage Game” because one of the Panther players referred to West Virginia, which was winless in 1960, as rebuilding its program with “Western Pennsylvania garbage.”
- 1965: At the time, the 1965 contest was one of the highest-scoring major college games ever played. Teletype operators across the country kept messaging the Mountaineer Field press box, wondering if the score was real, as West Virginia beat Pitt 63–48. The loss began a stretch of six losses in seven games for Pitt that included a 69–13 loss to Notre Dame.
- 1970: West Virginia led 35–8 at halftime, but Pitt switched to a Power-I offense and rallied with four touchdowns in the second half to upset the Mountaineers. Afterward, West Virginia fans beat on the dressing room door, screaming in anger at then-rookie head coach Bobby Bowden. Bowden, who went on to set coaching records and win multiple national titles at Florida State, later referred to the game as his “darkest day in coaching.”
- 1975: Walk-on kicker Bill McKenzie's game-winning field goal in the closing seconds led to one of the longest postgame celebrations ever at old Mountaineer Field as West Virginia beat Pitt 17–14. Led by Heisman Trophy winner Tony Dorsett, Pitt would rebound to win the 1976 national championship and 67 of its next 77 regular-season games.
- 1982: Pitt spent much of the season at No. 1 while starting 7–0, but held on to beat West Virginia 16–13 only when kicker Paul Woodside's long field goal attempt hit the crossbar.
- 1983: Jeff Hostetler drove the Mountaineers 90 yards in the final two minutes for West Virginia to overcome Pitt, 24–21. It was WVU's first victory over Pitt since 1975, and future College Football Hall of Fame coach Don Nehlen's first in four tries as the Mountaineers head coach.
- 1997: In Pitt coach Walt Harris' first season, Pitt beat WVU 41–38 in 3OT. This win propelled the Panthers into their first bowl game in eight years and began the school's turnaround following six losing seasons in seven years. West Virginia's Marc Bulger passed for 348 yards in the losing effort.
- 2002: West Virginia Quarterback Rasheed Marshall, a Brashear High School graduate, gets his first win against former City League rival Rod Rutherford, who played quarterback at Perry Traditional Academy. A sellout crowd of 66,731 was the largest ever for a game at Heinz Field at the time.
- 2007: On Saturday, December 1, 2007, the 100th edition of the Backyard Brawl took place at Mountaineer Field in Morgantown, West Virginia. The 4–7 Panthers upset the 2nd–ranked Mountaineers 13–9, knocking West Virginia out of the BCS National Championship Game. The game was one of the most important Backyard Brawls, one of the biggest upsets for the Pittsburgh Panthers, one of the biggest upsets of the season, and was voted as the "Game of the Year" by ESPNU. The contest was also initially the final game for Mountaineers coach Rich Rodriguez, who infamously left WVU to become the head coach at Michigan after the game.
- 2009: Despite suffering back-to-back losses in 2007 and 2008, WVU got revenge when the series returned to Morgantown in 2009. The unranked Mountaineers upset the No. 8 Panthers 19–16 on a game-ending field goal. The 2009 Backyard Brawl was one of the most watched games in the history of ESPN2. Although Pitt lost to WVU and No. 5 Cincinnati the following week, Pitt finished the season with ten wins for the first time since 1981.
- 2011: As the final Backyard Brawl with both schools as a member of the Big East Conference, West Virginia overcame a ten-point deficit to beat Pitt, 21–20. Late in the regular season, the win was critical for the Mountaineers' then "slim hopes" to win a share of the conference title and "for earning the league's automatic BCS berth." West Virginia went on to beat South Florida the next week, win a share of the conference title, and secure a BCS bid to the program's first ever Orange Bowl appearance, where they beat Clemson 70-33.
- 2022: The first meeting between the two teams since 2011 took place during Week 1 of the 2022 season. The game set a Pittsburgh city record for attendance at a sporting event at 70,622. The game was back and forth, featuring 7 lead changes with Pitt overcoming a 4th quarter deficit and taking the lead on a 56-yard M.J. Devonshire pick-six with 2:58 remaining in the game. Pitt would then stop a promising West Virginia drive to win the game 38–31.
- 2025: This was the first matchup between Pittsburgh and West Virginia after Rich Rodriguez returned to coach the Mountaineers in the 2025 season. Pitt had a 24-14 lead in the fourth quarter, but West Virginia scored 10 unanswered points including a touchdown in the final seconds of regulation to send the game to overtime. West Virginia's Tye Edwards scored a touchdown after receiving the ball and the Mountaineers held off Pitt on fourth down to win 31–24.

=== Game results ===
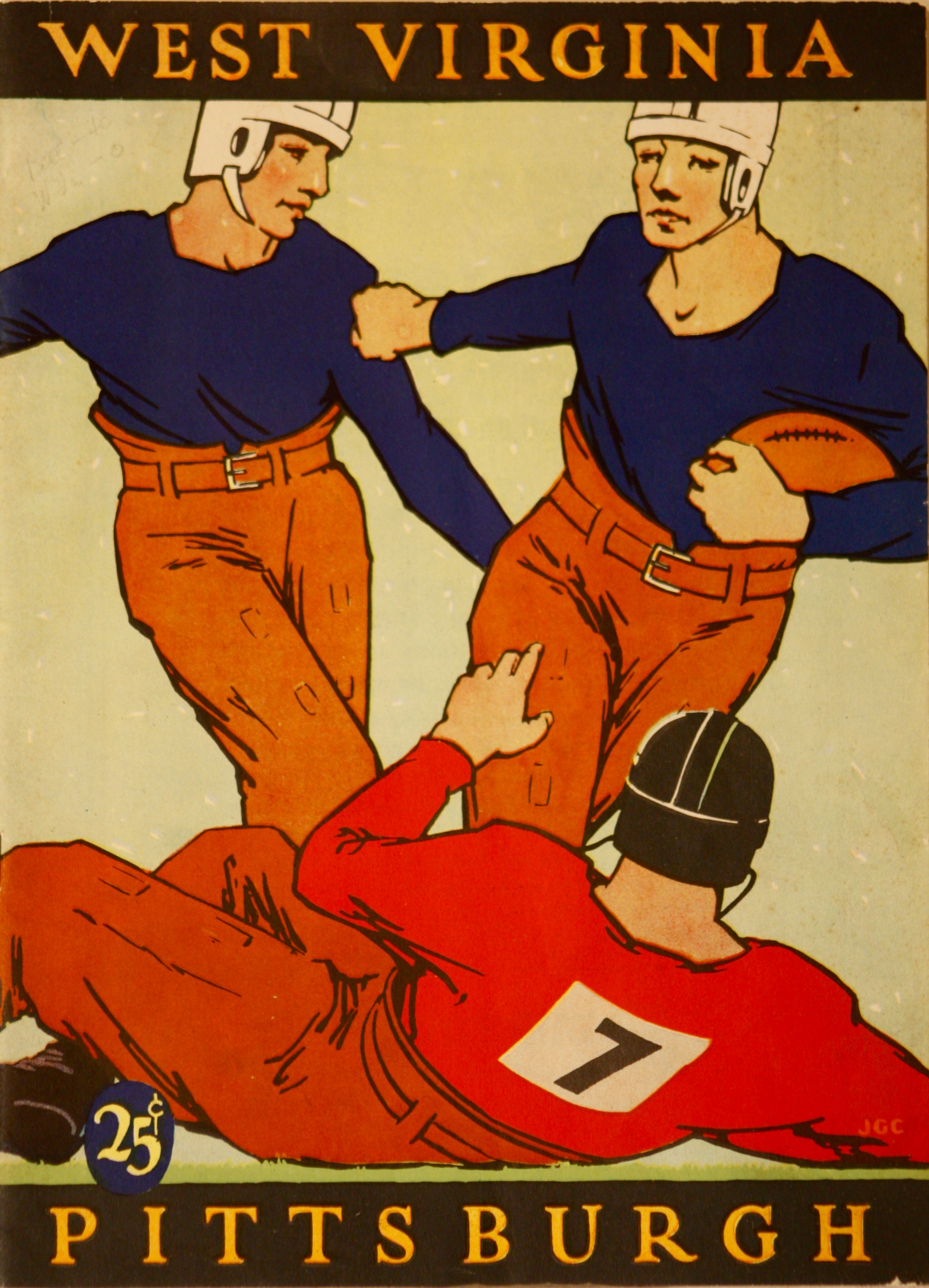
1927 official program from Pitt Stadium

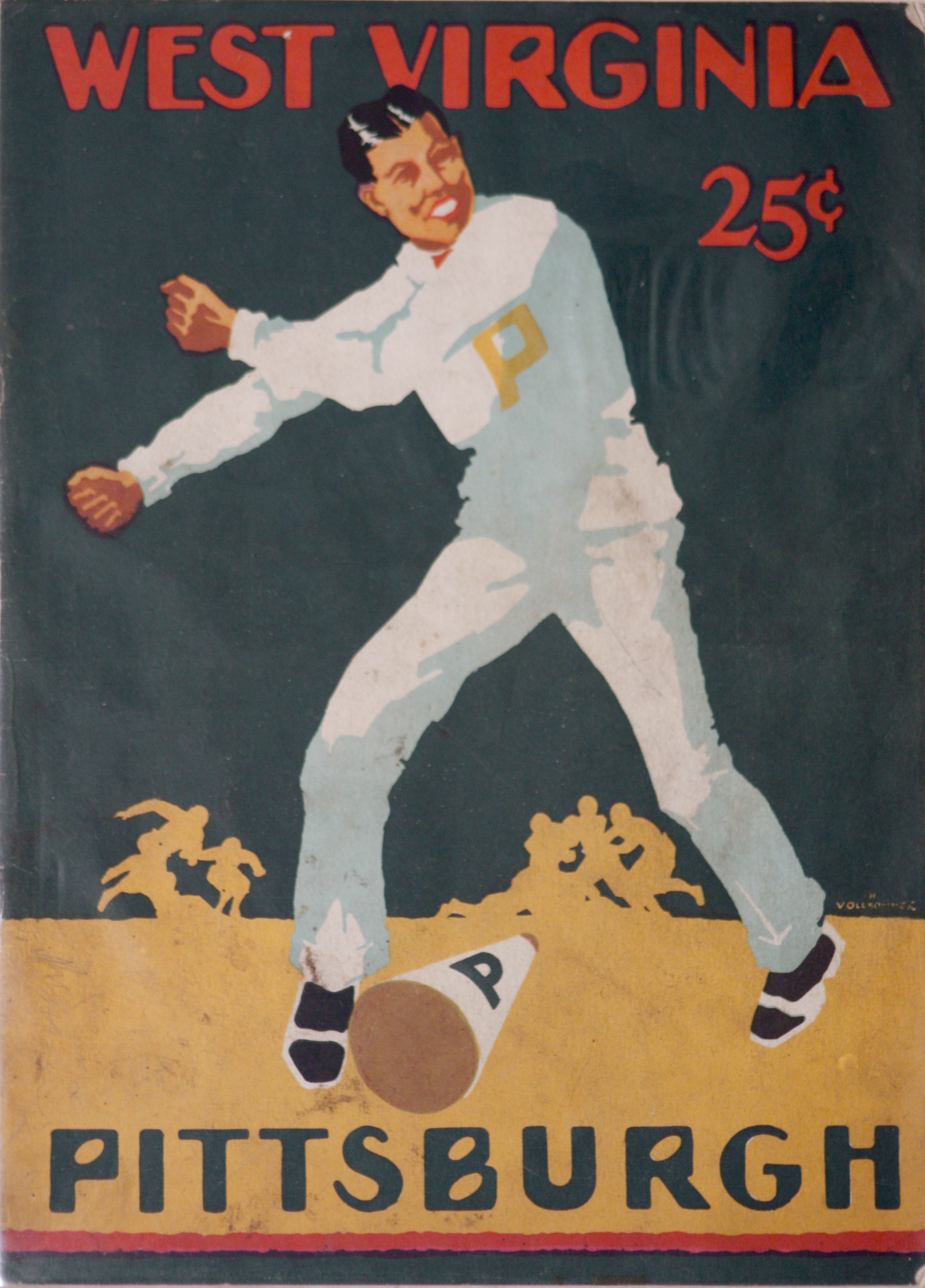
1928 official souvenir football program

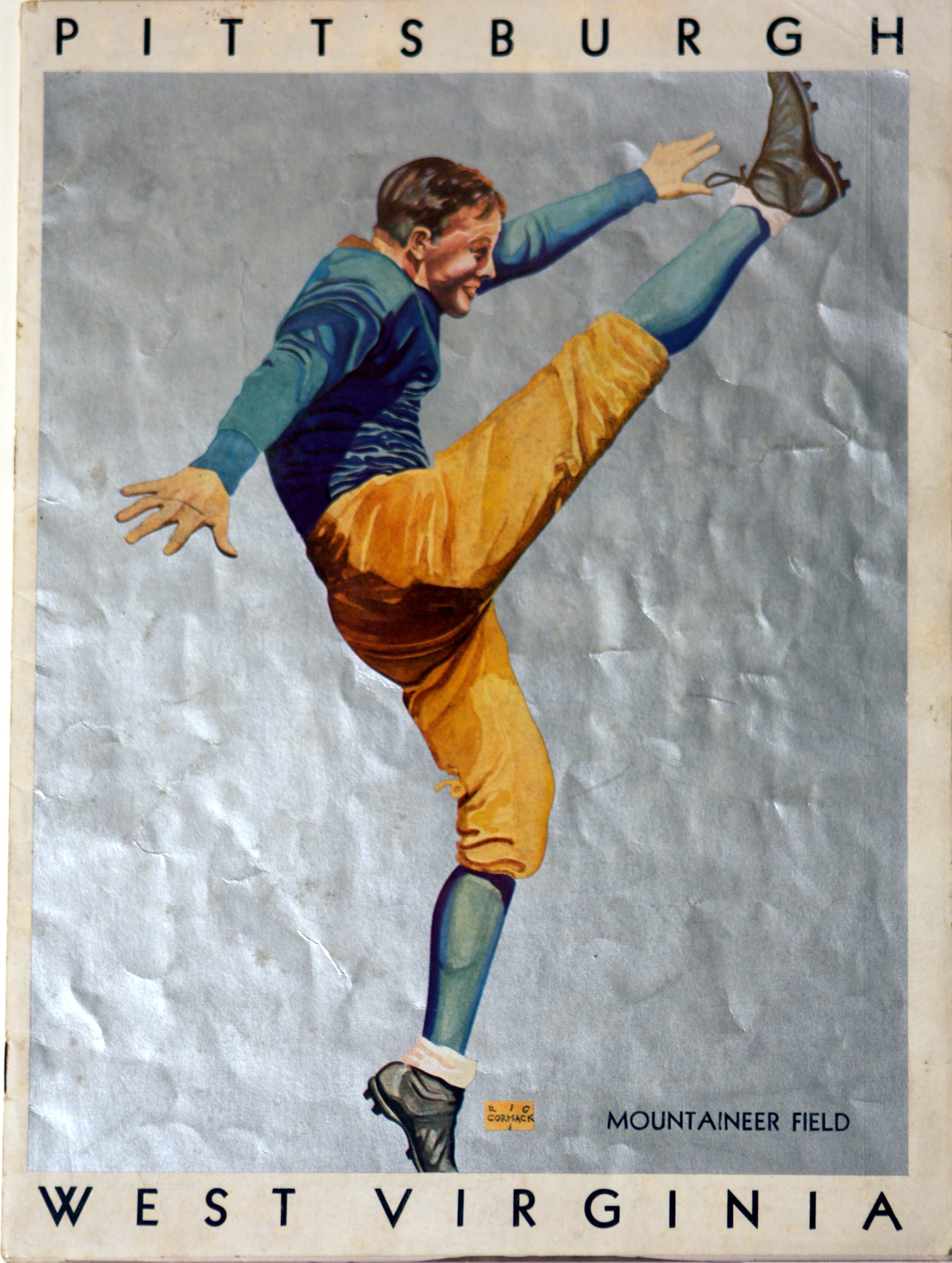
1933 official program from Old Mountaineer Field

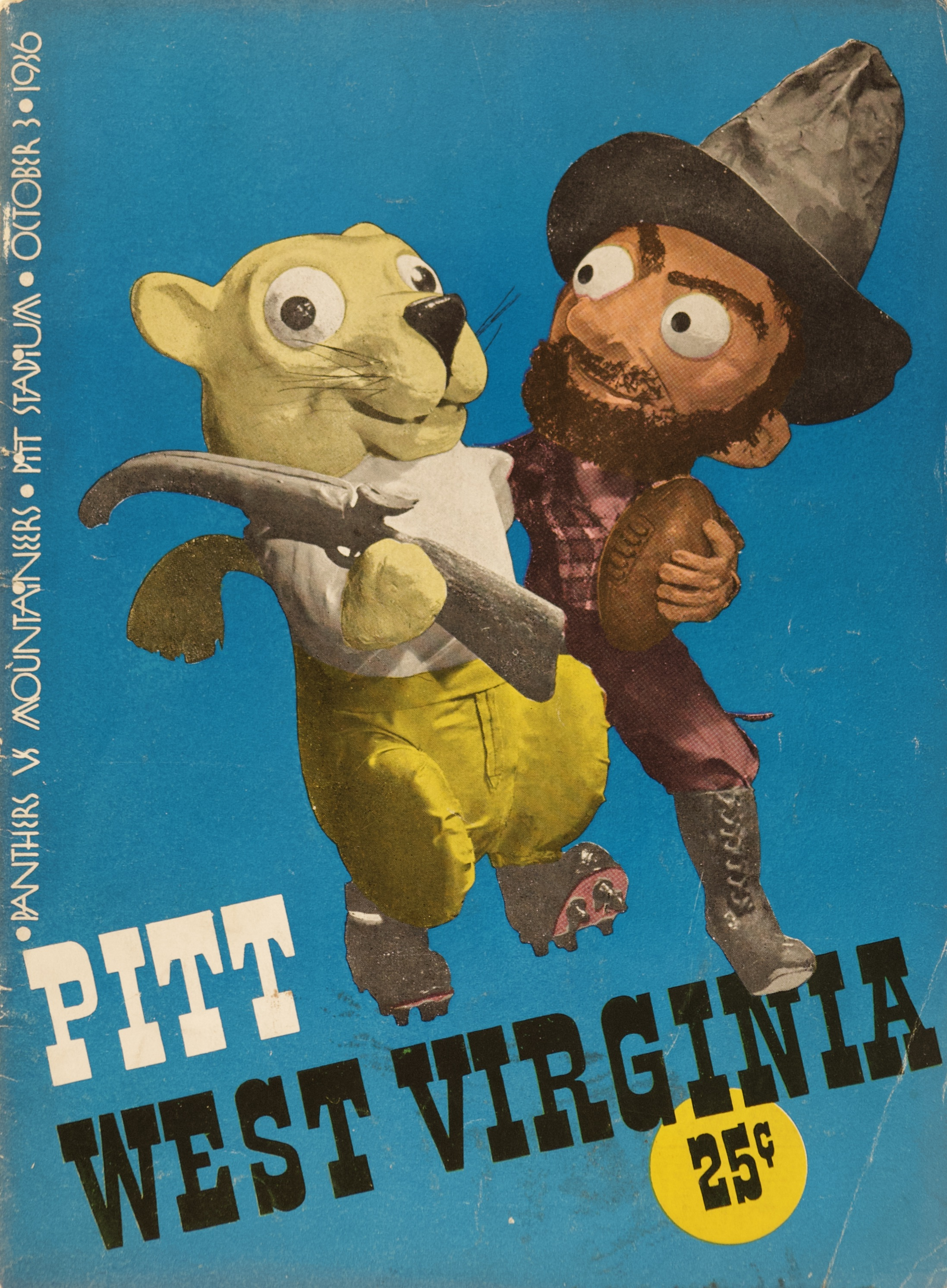
1936 Backyard Brawl official program

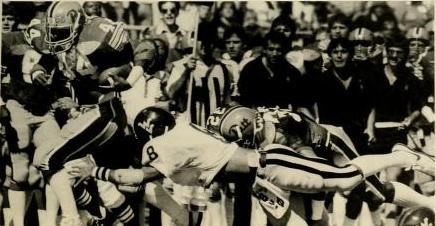
1982 Backyard Brawl

Pittsburgh victories	West Virginia victories

No.	Date	Location	Winning team		Losing team	
1	October 26, 1895	Morgantown	West Virginia	8	W.U.P.	0
2	November 4, 1898	Fairmont, West Virginia	West Virginia	6	W.U.P.	0
3	October 6, 1900	Morgantown	West Virginia	6	W.U.P.	5
4	October 5, 1901	Morgantown	W.U.P.	12	West Virginia	0
5	October 22, 1902	Exposition Park	West Virginia	23	W.U.P.	6
6	October 3, 1903	Morgantown	West Virginia	24	W.U.P.	6
7	November 8, 1904	Exposition Park	W.U.P.	53	West Virginia	0
8	November 10, 1906	Exposition Park	W.U.P.	17	West Virginia	0
9	November 9, 1907	Exposition Park	W.U.P.	10	West Virginia	0
10	November 7, 1908	Exposition Park	W.U.P.	11	West Virginia	0
11	November 6, 1909	Morgantown	Tie	0	Tie	0
12	November 5, 1910	Forbes Field	Pittsburgh	38	West Virginia	0
13	October 11, 1913	Forbes Field	Pittsburgh	40	West Virginia	0
14	September 29, 1917	Morgantown	Pittsburgh	14	West Virginia	9
15	October 11, 1919	Forbes Field	Pittsburgh	26	West Virginia	0
16	October 9, 1920	Forbes Field	Pittsburgh	34	West Virginia	13
17	October 8, 1921	Forbes Field	Pittsburgh	21	West Virginia	13
18	October 14, 1922	Forbes Field	West Virginia	9	Pittsburgh	6
19	October 13, 1923	Forbes Field	West Virginia	13	Pittsburgh	7
20	October 11, 1924	Forbes Field	Pittsburgh	14	West Virginia	7
21	October 10, 1925	Pitt Stadium	Pittsburgh	15	West Virginia	7
22	November 6, 1926	Pitt Stadium	Pittsburgh	17	West Virginia	7
23	October 8, 1927	Pitt Stadium	Pittsburgh	40	West Virginia	0
24	October 13, 1928	Pitt Stadium	West Virginia	9	Pittsburgh	6
25	October 8, 1929	Pitt Stadium	Pittsburgh	27	West Virginia	7
26	October 4, 1930	Mountaineer Field	Pittsburgh	16	West Virginia	0
27	October 10, 1931	Pitt Stadium	Pittsburgh	34	West Virginia	0
28	October 1, 1932	Mountaineer Field	Pittsburgh	40	West Virginia	0
29	October 7, 1933	Mountaineer Field	Pittsburgh	21	West Virginia	0
30	October 6, 1934	Mountaineer Field	Pittsburgh	27	West Virginia	6
31	October 12, 1935	Pitt Stadium	Pittsburgh	24	West Virginia	6
32	October 3, 1936	Pitt Stadium	Pittsburgh	34	West Virginia	0
33	October 2, 1937	Mountaineer Field	Pittsburgh	20	West Virginia	0
34	September 24, 1938	Pitt Stadium	Pittsburgh	19	West Virginia	0
35	October 7, 1939	Pitt Stadium	Pittsburgh	20	West Virginia	0
36	October 9, 1943	Pitt Stadium	Pittsburgh	20	West Virginia	0
37	September 23, 1944	Pitt Stadium	Pittsburgh	26	West Virginia	13
38	September 29, 1945	Pitt Stadium	Pittsburgh	30	West Virginia	0
39	September 28, 1946	Pitt Stadium	Pittsburgh	33	West Virginia	7
40	November 29, 1947	Pitt Stadium	West Virginia	17	Pittsburgh	2
41	October 9, 1948	Pitt Stadium	Pittsburgh	16	West Virginia	6
42	October 8, 1949	Mountaineer Field	No. 19 Pittsburgh	20	West Virginia	7
43	November 4, 1950	Pitt Stadium	Pittsburgh	21	West Virginia	7
44	November 17, 1951	Pitt Stadium	Pittsburgh	32	West Virginia	12
45	October 25, 1952	Pitt Stadium	West Virginia	16	No. 18 Pittsburgh	0
46	September 26, 1953	Pitt Stadium	No. 16 West Virginia	17	No. 17 Pittsburgh	7
47	October 30, 1954	Mountaineer Field	Pittsburgh	13	No. 7 West Virginia	10
48	November 12, 1955	Pitt Stadium	No. 17 Pittsburgh	26	No. 6 West Virginia	7
49	September 22, 1956	Mountaineer Field	No. 10 Pittsburgh	14	West Virginia	13
50	November 9, 1957	Pitt Stadium	West Virginia	7	Pittsburgh	6
51	October 18, 1958	Pitt Stadium	Pittsburgh	15	West Virginia	8
52	October 17, 1959	Mountaineer Field	West Virginia	23	No. 20 Pittsburgh	15
53	October 15, 1960	Pitt Stadium	Pittsburgh	42	West Virginia	0
54	October 14, 1961	Pitt Stadium	West Virginia	20	Pittsburgh	6
55	October 13, 1962	Pitt Stadium	West Virginia	15	Pittsburgh	8

No.	Date	Location	Winning team		Losing team	
56	October 19, 1963	Mountaineer Field	No. 3 Pittsburgh	13	West Virginia	10
57	October 10, 1964	Pitt Stadium	Pittsburgh	14	West Virginia	0
58	October 2, 1965	Mountaineer Field	West Virginia	63	Pittsburgh	48
59	October 8, 1966	Pitt Stadium	Pittsburgh	17	West Virginia	14
60	October 7, 1967	Mountaineer Field	West Virginia	15	Pittsburgh	0
61	September 28, 1968	Pitt Stadium	West Virginia	38	Pittsburgh	15
62	October 25, 1969	Mountaineer Field	West Virginia	49	Pittsburgh	18
63	October 17, 1970	Pitt Stadium	Pittsburgh	36	West Virginia	35
64	October 2, 1971	Mountaineer Field	West Virginia	20	Pittsburgh	9
65	November 4, 1972	Pitt Stadium	West Virginia	38	Pittsburgh	20
66	October 13, 1973	Mountaineer Field	Pittsburgh	35	West Virginia	7
67	October 12, 1974	Pitt Stadium	Pittsburgh	31	West Virginia	14
68	November 8, 1975	Mountaineer Field	West Virginia	17	No. 20 Pittsburgh	14
69	November 13, 1976	Pitt Stadium	No. 1 Pittsburgh	24	West Virginia	16
70	November 5, 1977	Mountaineer Field	No. 12 Pittsburgh	44	West Virginia	3
71	November 11, 1978	Pitt Stadium	No. 20 Pittsburgh	52	West Virginia	7
72	November 10, 1979	Mountaineer Field	No. 12 Pittsburgh	24	West Virginia	17
73	October 18, 1980	Pitt Stadium	No. 11 Pittsburgh	42	West Virginia	14
74	October 10, 1981	Mountaineer Field	No. 4 Pittsburgh	17	West Virginia	0
75	October 2, 1982	Pitt Stadium	No. 2 Pittsburgh	16	No. 14 West Virginia	13
76	October 1, 1983	Mountaineer Field	No. 7 West Virginia	24	Pittsburgh	21
77	September 29, 1984	Pitt Stadium	West Virginia	28	Pittsburgh	10
78	September 28, 1985	Mountaineer Field	Tie	10	Tie	10
79	September 27, 1986	Pitt Stadium	Pittsburgh	48	West Virginia	16
80	September 26, 1987	Mountaineer Field	Pittsburgh	6	West Virginia	3
81	September 24, 1988	Pitt Stadium	No. 12 West Virginia	31	Pittsburgh	10
82	September 30, 1989	Mountaineer Field	Tie	31	Tie	31
83	September 29, 1990	Pitt Stadium	West Virginia	38	Pittsburgh	24
84	August 31, 1991	Mountaineer Field	Pittsburgh	34	West Virginia	3
85	September 12, 1992	Pitt Stadium	West Virginia	44	Pittsburgh	6
86	October 23, 1993	Mountaineer Field	No. 18 West Virginia	42	Pittsburgh	21
87	October 15, 1994	Pitt Stadium	West Virginia	47	Pittsburgh	41
88	November 24, 1995	Mountaineer Field	West Virginia	21	Pittsburgh	0
89	August 31, 1996	Pitt Stadium	West Virginia	34	Pittsburgh	0
90	November 28, 1997	Mountaineer Field	Pittsburgh	41	West Virginia	38^{3OT}
91	November 27, 1998	Three Rivers Stadium	West Virginia	52	Pittsburgh	14
92	November 27, 1999	Mountaineer Field	West Virginia	52	Pittsburgh	21
93	November 24, 2000	Three Rivers Stadium	Pittsburgh	38	West Virginia	28
94	November 24, 2001	Mountaineer Field	Pittsburgh	23	West Virginia	17
95	November 30, 2002	Heinz Field	No. 24 West Virginia	24	No. 17 Pittsburgh	17
96	November 15, 2003	Mountaineer Field	West Virginia	52	No. 16 Pittsburgh	31
97	November 25, 2004	Heinz Field	Pittsburgh	16	No. 21 West Virginia	13
98	November 24, 2005	Mountaineer Field	No. 12 West Virginia	45	Pittsburgh	13
99	November 16, 2006	Heinz Field	No. 8 West Virginia	45	Pittsburgh	27
100	December 1, 2007	Mountaineer Field	Pittsburgh	13	No. 2 West Virginia	9
101	November 28, 2008	Heinz Field	Pittsburgh	19	West Virginia	15
102	November 27, 2009	Mountaineer Field	West Virginia	19	No. 8 Pittsburgh	16
103	November 26, 2010	Heinz Field	West Virginia	35	Pittsburgh	10
104	November 25, 2011	Mountaineer Field	West Virginia	21	Pittsburgh	20
105	September 1, 2022	Acrisure Stadium	No. 17 Pittsburgh	38	West Virginia	31
106	September 16, 2023	Mountaineer Field	West Virginia	17	Pittsburgh	6
107	September 14, 2024	Acrisure Stadium	Pittsburgh	38	West Virginia	34
108	September 13, 2025	Mountaineer Field	West Virginia	31	Pittsburgh	24^{OT}
Series: Pittsburgh leads 63–42–3

== Basketball ==
Pittsburgh–West Virginia men's basketball rivalry
- Teams: Pittsburgh Panthers; West Virginia Mountaineers
- First meeting: February 17, 1906; Pittsburgh, 30–25
- Latest meeting: November 13, 2025; West Virginia, 71–49
- Next meeting: 2026

Statistics
- Total meetings: 192
- All-time record: West Virginia leads, 102–90
- Largest victory: February 14, 1966; West Virginia, 103–63
- Longest win streak: West Virginia, 13 (1957–1963)
- Current win streak: West Virginia, 1 (2025–present)

The Backyard Brawl moniker is also used for the basketball rivalry between the two schools, which dates to February 17, 1905. The teams began competing annually since 1918, and played each season continually until 2012. Through the first 100 meetings, the teams were evenly matched both winning 50 games.

Pitt began playing basketball in the Big East Conference in 1982–83, with the Mountaineers joining in 1995–96. The basketball rivalry has heated up over the last several years as each team has been among the best in the country and the games have taken on added significance. On February 9, 2006, for the first time in the history of the series, in the 169th edition, Pitt and WVU were both nationally ranked as they squared off in Pitt's Petersen Events Center. Pitt won, but a few weeks later, the two ranked teams played at WVU Coliseum with the Mountaineers winning. In the 2008–09 season, the Panthers swept both games during the regular season and came into the tournament ranked No. 2, but were upset by the Mountaineers in the quarterfinals of the Big East tournament.

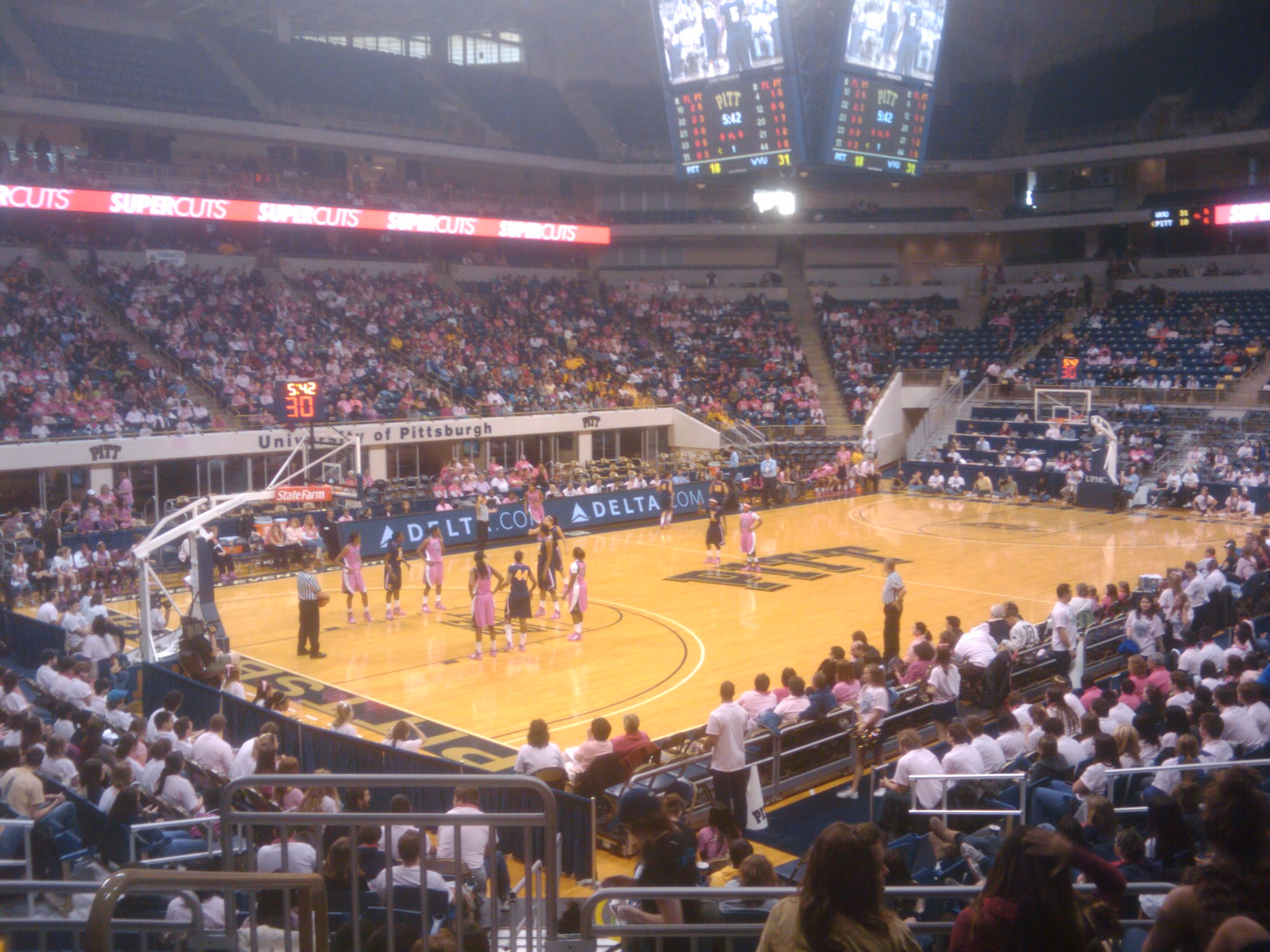
The 2011 women's Backyard Brawl in Pittsburgh.

During a February 2010 game when Pittsburgh visited West Virginia, several times during the course of the game, West Virginia fans threw objects at the Pittsburgh team. A Pittsburgh assistant coach was injured when an object was thrown at him. The actions received widespread attention. During the second half of the game, coach Bob Huggins used a microphone to address the fans. West Virginia University President Jim Clements issued an apology to the University of Pittsburgh community. Additionally, West Virginia vowed to address security, as the incident closing followed similar occurrences in games against Syracuse and Ohio State. This game was followed with a rematch nine days later in Pittsburgh, and while there were no off-court incidents, the game proved to be one of the most memorable in the history of the series as the 25th ranked Panthers upset the fourth ranked Mountaineers 98–95 in the first triple overtime basketball game to be played between the two schools.

The 2011–12 season marked the end of the Brawl within Big East conference play. Pitt and WVU traded road wins, with Pitt winning in Morgantown 72–66, and WVU winning at the Petersen Events Center for only the second time ever 66–48. The rivalry was dormant for a few years as WVU began playing in the Big 12 in 2012, while Pitt moved to the ACC in 2013. However, the series renewed in non-conference play beginning in 2017, with WVU winning the last four recent matchups. In 2021, West Virginia sold out the WVU Coliseum for the first time ever in the month of November when it hosted the matchup, on its way to reaching 100 wins in the series.

In women's basketball, West Virginia leads the modern series, begun in 1975, 30–19.

Pittsburgh victories	West Virginia victories

No.	Date	Location	Winner	Score
1	February 17, 1906	Pittsburgh, PA	W.U.P.	30–25
2	February 14, 1907	Pittsburgh, PA	W.U.P.	44–14
3	March 2, 1907	Morgantown, WV	West Virginia	26–20
4	January 18, 1908	Pittsburgh, PA	Pittsburgh	58–20
5	March 7, 1908	Morgantown, WV	Pittsburgh	20–19
6	January 29, 1915	Morgantown, WV	Pittsburgh	42–18
7	January 10, 1918	Pittsburgh, PA	Pittsburgh	30–20
8	January 25, 1918	Pittsburgh, PA	Pittsburgh	36–24
9	January 16, 1919	Morgantown, WV	West Virginia	35–29
10	March 1, 1919	Pittsburgh, PA	Pittsburgh	33–30
11	January 15, 1920	Pittsburgh, PA	Pittsburgh	38–27
12	January 31, 1920	Pittsburgh, PA	West Virginia	28–26
13	March 6, 1920	Pittsburgh, PA	Pittsburgh	33–24
14	February 17, 1921	Pittsburgh, PA	Pittsburgh	45–32
15	March 12, 1921	Morgantown, WV	West Virginia	43–24
16	January 20, 1922	Pittsburgh, PA	Pittsburgh	37–27
17	March 11, 1922	Morgantown, WV	Pittsburgh	31–26
18	January 18, 1923	Pittsburgh, PA	Pittsburgh	26–21
19	March 3, 1923	Morgantown, WV	West Virginia	33–28
20	January 17, 1924	Pittsburgh, PA	West Virginia	25–23
21	March 1, 1924	Morgantown, WV	West Virginia	28–14
22	January 16, 1925	Pittsburgh, PA	West Virginia	30–22
23	February 28, 1925	Morgantown, WV	West Virginia	35–25
24	January 22, 1926	Pittsburgh, PA	Pittsburgh	38–23
25	February 26, 1926	Morgantown, WV	West Virginia	37–30
26	January 20, 1927	Pittsburgh, PA	West Virginia	29–23
27	March 3, 1927	Morgantown, WV	Pittsburgh	43–33
28	January 20, 1928	Pittsburgh, PA	Pittsburgh	51–26
29	March 3, 1928	Morgantown, WV	Pittsburgh	45–42
30	January 18, 1929	Pittsburgh, PA	West Virginia	40–35
31	March 2, 1929	Morgantown, WV	Pittsburgh	41–19
32	February 22, 1930	Pittsburgh, PA	Pittsburgh	21–19
33	March 8, 1930	Morgantown, WV	West Virginia	33–25
34	January 17, 1931	Pittsburgh, PA	Pittsburgh	17–15
35	March 11, 1931	Morgantown, WV	Pittsburgh	24–22
36	January 29, 1932	Pittsburgh, PA	Pittsburgh	33–27
37	March 8, 1932	Morgantown, WV	Pittsburgh	22–19
38	January 28, 1933	Pittsburgh, PA	Pittsburgh	42–20
39	March 11, 1933	Morgantown, WV	Pittsburgh	45–35
40	January 27, 1934	Pittsburgh, PA	Pittsburgh	42–21
41	March 10, 1934	Morgantown, WV	Pittsburgh	27–26
42	January 26, 1935	Pittsburgh, PA	Pittsburgh	35–34
43	March 13, 1935	Morgantown, WV	#21 West Virginia	43–26
44	March 18, 1935	Morgantown, WV	Pittsburgh	35–22
45	January 25, 1936	Pittsburgh, PA	Pittsburgh	41–26
46	March 11, 1936	Morgantown, WV	West Virginia	43–42
47	January 30, 1937	Pittsburgh, PA	Pittsburgh	44–36
48	March 13, 1937	Morgantown, WV	Pittsburgh	48–42
49	January 29, 1938	Pittsburgh, PA	Pittsburgh	43–40
50	March 12, 1938	Morgantown, WV	West Virginia	38–35
51	February 18, 1939	Pittsburgh, PA	West Virginia	45–42
52	March 11, 1939	Morgantown, WV	Pittsburgh	49–43
53	February 20, 1940	Pittsburgh, PA	Pittsburgh	68–49
54	March 9, 1940	Morgantown, WV	West Virginia	42–35
55	February 11, 1941	Pittsburgh, PA	Pittsburgh	56–45
56	February 4, 1942	Pittsburgh, PA	West Virginia	66–47
57	January 9, 1943	Pittsburgh, PA	Pittsburgh	48–33
58	February 27, 1943	Morgantown, WV	West Virginia	82–64
59	February 16, 1944	Pittsburgh, PA	Pittsburgh	59–55
60	February 26, 1944	Morgantown, WV	Pittsburgh	60–57
61	February 21, 1945	Pittsburgh, PA	Pittsburgh	55–34
62	February 24, 1945	Morgantown, WV	West Virginia	50–47
63	February 13, 1946	Pittsburgh, PA	#7 West Virginia	61–41
64	March 2, 1946	Morgantown, WV	#7 West Virginia	81–61
65	February 8, 1947	Pittsburgh, PA	#12 West Virginia	52–41
66	March 1, 1947	Morgantown, WV	#12 West Virginia	72–59
67	February 20, 1948	Pittsburgh, PA	#12 West Virginia	70–59
68	March 6, 1948	Morgantown, WV	#12 West Virginia	52–36
69	February 16, 1949	Pittsburgh, PA	West Virginia	54–51
70	March 5, 1949	Morgantown, WV	Pittsburgh	34–32
71	February 25, 1950	Pittsburgh, PA	Pittsburgh	55–53
72	March 4, 1950	Morgantown, WV	West Virginia	59–53
73	February 17, 1951	Morgantown, WV	West Virginia	56–52
74	February 26, 1951	Pittsburgh, PA	Pittsburgh	74–72
75	January 12, 1952	Morgantown, WV	#11 West Virginia	79–60
76	January 30, 1952	Pittsburgh, PA	#10 West Virginia	67–47
77	January 20, 1953	Morgantown, WV	West Virginia	95–70
78	February 12, 1953	Pittsburgh, PA	Pittsburgh	67–65
79	January 16, 1954	Morgantown, WV	Pittsburgh	70–59
80	February 16, 1954	Pittsburgh, PA	Pittsburgh	83–64
81	January 29, 1955	Morgantown, WV	West Virginia	88–74
82	February 16, 1955	Pittsburgh, PA	West Virginia	93–86
83	January 18, 1956	Pittsburgh, PA	West Virginia	84–70
84	February 25, 1956	Morgantown, WV	Pittsburgh	94–77
85	January 8, 1957	Pittsburgh, PA	#18 West Virginia	89–86
86	February 23, 1957	Morgantown, WV	#14 West Virginia	107–93
87	January 15, 1958	Pittsburgh, PA	#1 West Virginia	71–64
88	February 22, 1958	Morgantown, WV	#3 West Virginia	99–86
89	February 3, 1959	Morgantown, WV	#10 West Virginia	73–64
90	February 18, 1959	Pittsburgh, PA	#11 West Virginia	90–69
91	January 27, 1960	Pittsburgh, PA	#4 West Virginia	76–66
92	February 20, 1960	Morgantown, WV	#5 West Virginia	89–75
93	January 18, 1961	Pittsburgh, PA	West Virginia	73–68
94	February 18, 1961	Morgantown, WV	#10 West Virginia	92–84
95	January 20, 1962	Morgantown, WV	West Virginia	88–78
96	February 7, 1962	Pittsburgh, PA	West Virginia	80–76
97	February 2, 1963	Pittsburgh, PA	West Virginia	68–67

No.	Date	Location	Winner	Score
98	February 13, 1963	Morgantown, WV	Pittsburgh	69–68
99	January 18, 1964	Pittsburgh, PA	Pittsburgh	92–76
100	February 12, 1964	Morgantown, WV	West Virginia	86–84
101	January 11, 1965	Morgantown, WV	West Virginia	86–72
102	January 26, 1965	Pittsburgh, PA	West Virginia	76–75
103	January 25, 1966	Pittsburgh, PA	West Virginia	90–79
104	February 14, 1966	Morgantown, WV	West Virginia	103–63
105	January 18, 1967	Pittsburgh, PA	West Virginia	102–78
106	February 6, 1967	Morgantown, WV	West Virginia	81–62
107	January 17, 1968	Morgantown, WV	West Virginia	90–64
108	February 21, 1968	Pittsburgh, PA	West Virginia	87–76
109	January 28, 1969	Pittsburgh, PA	Pittsburgh	90–87
110	February 12, 1969	Morgantown, WV	West Virginia	89–69
111	January 14, 1970	Pittsburgh, PA	West Virginia	67–66
112	March 3, 1970	Morgantown, WV	Pittsburgh	92–87
113	February 3, 1971	Pittsburgh, PA	West Virginia	95–91
114	March 3, 1971	Morgantown, WV	West Virginia	66–64
115	January 10, 1972	Pittsburgh, PA	Pittsburgh	91–76
116	March 4, 1972	Morgantown, WV	West Virginia	104–90
117	February 5, 1973	Pittsburgh, PA	Pittsburgh	77–64
118	February 27, 1973	Morgantown, WV	West Virginia	59–58
119	December 1, 1973	Morgantown, WV	West Virginia	82–78
120	March 2, 1974	Pittsburgh, PA	#11 Pittsburgh	83–78
121	December 3, 1974	Morgantown, WV	West Virginia	82–78
122	February 12, 1975	Pittsburgh, PA	Pittsburgh	83–77
123	March 7, 1975	Morgantown, WV	West Virginia	75–73
124	January 7, 1976	Pittsburgh, PA	Pittsburgh	70–61
125	February 11, 1976	Morgantown, WV	West Virginia	85–72
126	January 3, 1977	Pittsburgh, PA	West Virginia	100–91
127	February 9, 1977	Morgantown, WV	West Virginia	90–69
128	March 2, 1977	Philadelphia, PA	West Virginia	66–54
129	January 4, 1978	Pittsburgh, PA	Pittsburgh	71–66
130	February 8, 1978	Morgantown, WV	Pittsburgh	87–76
131	January 20, 1979	Wheeling, WV	West Virginia	93–92
132	February 3, 1979	Pittsburgh, PA	Pittsburgh	72–57
133	February 2, 1980	Morgantown, WV	West Virginia	68–66
134	February 16, 1980	Pittsburgh, PA	West Virginia	67–66
135	January 31, 1981	Morgantown, WV	West Virginia	76–63
136	February 21, 1981	Pittsburgh, PA	Pittsburgh	81–64
137	January 29, 1982	Pittsburgh, PA	West Virginia	48–45
138	February 24, 1982	Morgantown, WV	#6 West Virginia	82–77
139	March 6, 1982	Pittsburgh, PA	Pittsburgh	79–72
140	January 15, 1983	Pittsburgh, PA	Pittsburgh	81–67
141	December 17, 1983	Morgantown, WV	West Virginia	56–53
142	December 15, 1984	Pittsburgh, PA	Pittsburgh	84–65
143	December 14, 1985	Morgantown, WV	West Virginia	74–63
144	December 13, 1986	Pittsburgh, PA	#17 Pittsburgh	78–57
145	December 12, 1987	Morgantown, WV	#2 Pittsburgh	70–64
146	December 10, 1988	Pittsburgh, PA	West Virginia	84–81
147	December 9, 1989	Morgantown, WV	West Virginia	97–93
148	December 8, 1990	Pittsburgh, PA	#11 Pittsburgh	96–87
149	December 14, 1991	Morgantown, WV	West Virginia	86–85
150	December 12, 1992	Pittsburgh, PA	Pittsburgh	82–78
151	December 11, 1993	Morgantown, WV	West Virginia	99–91
152	December 10, 1994	Pittsburgh, PA	West Virginia	84–80
153	January 6, 1996	Morgantown, WV	Pittsburgh	84–83
154	February 29, 1996	Pittsburgh, PA	Pittsburgh	83–63
155	February 1, 1997	Morgantown, WV	West Virginia	74–59
156	January 28, 1998	Pittsburgh, PA	#17 West Virginia	76–72
157	February 3, 1998	Morgantown, WV	#15 West Virginia	90–72
158	February 17, 1999	Pittsburgh, PA	Pittsburgh	69–67
159	February 10, 2000	Charleston, WV	West Virginia	62–58
160	January 31, 2001	Pittsburgh, PA	Pittsburgh	63–46
161	February 8, 2001	Morgantown, WV	West Virginia	69–68
162	February 16, 2002	Morgantown, WV	#14 Pittsburgh	85–75
163	March 2, 2002	Pittsburgh, PA	#10 Pittsburgh	92–65
164	January 14, 2003	Morgantown, WV	#3 Pittsburgh	80–61
165	February 12, 2003	Pittsburgh, PA	#7 Pittsburgh	82–46
166	February 21, 2004	Morgantown, WV	#5 Pittsburgh	67–58
167	February 5, 2005	Morgantown, WV	West Virginia	83–78
168	February 23, 2005	Pittsburgh, PA	West Virginia	70–66
169	February 9, 2006	Pittsburgh, PA	#14 Pittsburgh	57–53
170	February 27, 2006	Morgantown, WV	#18 West Virginia	67–62
171	March 9, 2006	New York, NY	#19 Pittsburgh	68–57
172	February 7, 2007	Morgantown, WV	#7 Pittsburgh	60–47
173	February 27, 2007	Pittsburgh, PA	#12 Pittsburgh	80–66
174	February 7, 2008	Pittsburgh, PA	#21 Pittsburgh	55–54
175	March 3, 2008	Morgantown, WV	West Virginia	76–62
176	January 25, 2009	Morgantown, WV	#4 Pittsburgh	79–67
177	February 9, 2009	Pittsburgh, PA	#4 Pittsburgh	70–59
178	March 12, 2009	New York, NY	West Virginia	74–60
179	February 3, 2010	Morgantown, WV	#6 West Virginia	70–51
180	February 12, 2010	Pittsburgh, PA	#25 Pittsburgh	98–95
181	February 7, 2011	Morgantown, WV	#4 Pittsburgh	71–66
182	February 24, 2011	Pittsburgh, PA	#4 Pittsburgh	71–58
183	January 30, 2012	Morgantown, WV	Pittsburgh	72–66
184	February 16, 2012	Pittsburgh, PA	West Virginia	66–48
185	December 9, 2017	Pittsburgh, PA	#18 West Virginia	69–60
186	December 8, 2018	Morgantown, WV	West Virginia	69–59
187	November 15, 2019	Pittsburgh, PA	West Virginia	68–53
188	November 12, 2021	Morgantown, WV	West Virginia	74–59
189	November 11, 2022	Pittsburgh, PA	West Virginia	81–56
190	December 6, 2023	Morgantown, WV	Pittsburgh	80–63
191	November 15, 2024	Pittsburgh, PA	Pittsburgh	86–62
192	November 13, 2025	Morgantown, WV	West Virginia	71–49
Series: West Virginia leads 102–90

== Baseball ==
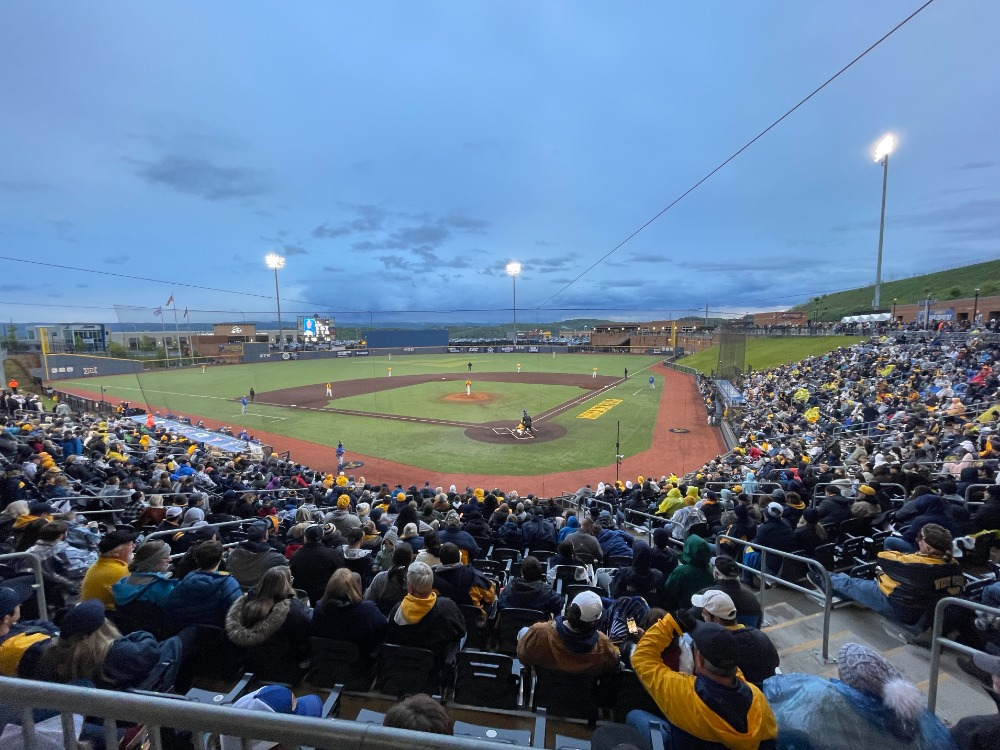
WVU baseball vs Pitt. May 3, 2023, Morgantown, WV.

Pittsburgh–West Virginia basebell rivalry
- Teams: Pittsburgh Panthers; West Virginia Mountaineers
- First meeting: May 18, 1895; West Virginia, 13–6
- Latest meeting: April 21, 2026; Pitt, 23–1
- Next meeting: 2027

Statistics
- Total meetings: 216
- All-time record: West Virginia leads, 122–94
- Largest victory: April 21, 2026; Pittsburgh, 23–1
- Longest win streak: West Virginia, 8 (2022–2025)
- Current win streak: Pittsburgh, 2 (2025–present)

Meeting for the first time in May 1895, even before the first football game between the two schools, the rivalry has now spanned 215 games with WVU leading 122–93. West Virginia plays its home games at Wagener Field at Kendrick Family Ballpark, while Pitt plays at Charles L. Cost Field in the Petersen Sports Complex. The largest crowd in Wagener Field history and the largest crown in the all-time series was the Backyard Brawl on April 2, 2025 with an attendance of 4,629. Over the years the game has also been played at the home of the Pittsburgh Pirates. These sites include Exposition Park, Forbes Field, Three Rivers Stadium, and PNC Park.

== Soccer ==
=== Men's soccer ===
Pittsburgh victories	West Virginia victories	Tie games

No.	Date	Location	Winner	Score
1	October 13, 1962	Pittsburgh, PA	Pittsburgh	5–1
2	October 19, 1963	Morgantown, WV	Pittsburgh	4–0
3	October 10, 1964	Pittsburgh, PA	Pittsburgh	3–1
4	October 30, 1965	Morgantown, WV	Pittsburgh	3–1
5	October 29, 1966	Pittsburgh, PA	West Virginia	1–0
6	October 21, 1967	Morgantown, WV	West Virginia	5–1
7	October 25, 1968	Pittsburgh, PA	West Virginia	3–0
8	October 24, 1969	Morgantown, WV	West Virginia	1–0
9	November 7, 1970	Pittsburgh, PA	Pittsburgh	1–0
10	November 6, 1971	Morgantown, WV	West Virginia	1–0
11	November 3, 1972	Pittsburgh, PA	West Virginia	1–0
12	October 13, 1973	Morgantown, WV	West Virginia	2–0
13	October 22, 1974	Pittsburgh, PA	West Virginia	2–0
14	November 8, 1975	Pittsburgh, PA	West Virginia	1–0
15	November 5, 1976	Pittsburgh, PA	West Virginia	2–0
16	November 1, 1977	Pittsburgh, PA	Pittsburgh	3–2
17	November 10, 1978	Pittsburgh, PA	West Virginia	3–0
18	November 7, 1979	Morgantown, WV	West Virginia	3–0
19	October 25, 1980	Pittsburgh, PA	West Virginia	4–0
20	November 5, 1981	Morgantown, WV	West Virginia	6–1
21	November 3, 1982	Pittsburgh, PA	West Virginia	2–1
22	October 1, 1983	Morgantown, WV	West Virginia	2–1
23	October 13, 1984	Pittsburgh, PA	West Virginia	1–0
24	October 11, 1985	Morgantown, WV	Tie	0–0
25	October 8, 1986	Pittsburgh, PA	West Virginia	2–0
26	September 22, 1987	Morgantown, WV	West Virginia	2–0

No.	Date	Location	Winner	Score
27	September 21, 1988	Pittsburgh, PA	West Virginia	3–1
28	September 20, 1989	Morgantown, WV	West Virginia	2–0
29	September 19, 1990	Pittsburgh, PA	West Virginia	4–2
30	October 16, 1991	Morgantown, WV	West Virginia	1–0
31	October 26, 1994	Pittsburgh, PA	Pittsburgh	4–1
32	November 1, 1995	Morgantown, WV	West Virginia	4–1
33	October 9, 1996	Pittsburgh, PA	West Virginia	2–1
34	September 10, 1997	Morgantown, WV	Pittsburgh	3–2
35	September 30, 1998	Pittsburgh, PA	West Virginia	3–0
36	September 8, 1999	Morgantown, WV	West Virginia	3–1
37	October 4, 2000	Pittsburgh, PA	Pittsburgh	1–0
38	September 19, 2001	Morgantown, WV	West Virginia	2–0
39	October 2, 2002	Pittsburgh, PA	Tie	0–0
40	October 21, 2003	Morgantown, WV	Tie	3–3
41	October 27, 2004	Morgantown, WV	West Virginia	2–1
42	October 5, 2005	Pittsburgh, PA	West Virginia	2–0
43	October 10, 2007	Pittsburgh, PA	West Virginia	3–1
44	October 8, 2008	Morgantown, WV	Tie	1–1
45	October 6, 2009	Pittsburgh, PA	Tie	0–0
46	October 13, 2010	Morgantown, WV	West Virginia	2–0
47	October 12, 2011	Morgantown, WV	West Virginia	2–0
48	September 26, 2017	Pittsburgh, PA	Pittsburgh	7–0
49	October 23, 2018	Morgantown, WV	West Virginia	2–1
50	August 29, 2022	Pittsburgh, PA	#7 Pittsburgh	3–0
Series: West Virginia leads 34–11–5

=== Women's Soccer ===
West Virginia leads Pitt all-time with a 13-2-1 record. The two teams have not played each other since they were both members of the Big East between 1996 and 2011.

== Lacrosse ==
Because neither school has an NCAA lacrosse program, the teams have had to compete annually at the club level. Despite that, they continue to play under the Backyard Brawl moniker.

From their team's respective foundings (1971 for West Virginia, 1982 for Pittsburgh) until 1990, they competed as independents. In 1990 both teams joined the National College Lacrosse League, where they played in the Allegheny Division. In 2006, the Men's Collegiate Lacrosse Association was founded, which both teams joined. West Virginia competed in the SouthEastern Lacrosse Conference (SELC), while Pittsburgh competed in the Continental Lacrosse Conference (CLC). In 2021, West Virginia left the SELC to become a founding member of the Atlantic Lacrosse Conference (ALC), they were followed by Pittsburgh in 2022.

Due to their independent club status, many of the early games' scores were not documented.

Pittsburgh victories	West Virginia victories	Tie games

No.	Date	Location	Winner	Score
1	March 19, 1983	Pittsburgh, PA	Pittsburgh	21–5
2	April 23, 1983	Morgantown, WV	Pittsburgh	17–8
3	April 11, 1996	Pittsburgh, PA	Pittsburgh	9–8
4	April 12, 1997	Morgantown, WV	West Virginia	9–6
5	March 24, 1999	Pittsburgh, PA	Pittsburgh	13–8
6	April 8, 2000	Morgantown, WV	West Virginia	8–3
7	March 18, 2001	Pittsburgh, PA	Pittsburgh	9–5
8	April 21, 2001	Pittsburgh, PA	Pittsburgh	14–8
9	April 7, 2002	Morgantown, WV	West Virginia	9–6
10	April 3, 2005	Pittsburgh, PA	Pittsburgh	21–3
11	April 16, 2006	Morgantown, WV	West Virginia	12–11^{OT}
12	April 15, 2007	Pittsburgh, PA	Pittsburgh	20–8
13	April 4, 2008	Morgantown, WV	Pittsburgh	13–12
14	February 21, 2009	Pittsburgh, PA	Pittsburgh	21–4
15	April 23, 2010	Morgantown, WV	Pittsburgh	13–11

No.	Date	Location	Winner	Score
16	April 15, 2011	Pittsburgh, PA	Pittsburgh	16–7
17	April 11, 2012	Morgantown, WV	Pittsburgh	12–10
18	April 9, 2014	Morgantown, WV	Pittsburgh	13–9
19	April 2, 2015	McMurray, PA	West Virginia	14–9
20	April 14, 2016	Morgantown, WV	Pittsburgh	26–5
21	April 13, 2017	Pittsburgh, PA	Pittsburgh	20–4
22	April 12, 2018	Morgantown, WV	Pittsburgh	15–7
23	April 11, 2019	Pittsburgh, PA	West Virginia	12–11^{OT}
24	April 13, 2022	Canonsburg, PA	Pittsburgh	14–8
25	April 24, 2022	Pittsburgh, PA	Pittsburgh	16–8
26	April 12, 2023	Morgantown, WV	West Virginia	18–4
27	April 6, 2024	Pittsburgh, PA	West Virginia	12–11
28	April 16, 2025	Morgantown, WV	Pittsburgh	12–10
29	April 10, 2026	Pittsburgh, PA	Pittsburgh	21–19
Series: Pittsburgh leads 21–8

Score Sources:

== See also ==
- List of NCAA college football rivalry games
- List of most-played college football series in NCAA Division I
