= List of MCLA teams =

This is a list of colleges and universities in the United States (and one school in Canada) which sponsored a men's lacrosse team that belonged to the Men's Collegiate Lacrosse Association in 2015. Per MCLA rules, a University or College with fielding an NCAA Division I FBS football team must play at the Division I level. Any other school plays at the MCLA Division II level, but may petition to "play up" at the Division I level. Likewise, teams designated as Division I may petition to "play down" at the Division II level, if they are deemed a "developing" team, and are ineligible for post season play.

== 2019 changes ==
Before the 2019 MCLA season, there were many changes to conferences. The Central Collegiate Lacrosse Association and the Pioneer Collegiate Lacrosse League agreed to merge into the Continental Lacrosse Conference, while the Great Rivers Lacrosse Conference merged with the Upper Midwest Lacrosse Conference and Lone Star Alliance.

== 2020 changes ==
Following the shortened 2020 season several SELC mid-Atlantic teams left to create the newest conference in the MCLA, the Atlantic Lacrosse Conference.

== Atlantic Lacrosse Conference ==
=== Division 1 ===
- Clemson: Clemson, South Carolina
- James Madison: Harrisonburg, Virginia
- Kentucky: Lexington, Kentucky
- Liberty: Lynchburg, Virginia
- North Carolina: Chapel Hill, North Carolina
- North Carolina State: Raleigh, North Carolina
- Tennessee: Knoxville, Tennessee
- Virginia Tech: Blacksburg, Virginia
- West Virginia: Morgantown, West Virginia

=== Division 2 ===
- Appalachian State: Boone, North Carolina
- Charleston: Charleston, South Carolina
- The Citadel: Charleston, South Carolina
- Charlotte: Charlotte, North Carolina
- Coastal Carolina: Conway, South Carolina
- Davidson: Davidson, North Carolina
- East Carolina: Greenville, North Carolina
- Elon: Elon, North Carolina
- High Point: High Point, North Carolina
- North Carolina-Wilmington: Wilmington, North Carolina
- Virginia Tech DII: Blacksburg, Virginia
- Wake Forest: Winston-Salem, North Carolina
- William & Mary: Williamsburg, Virginia

== Central Collegiate Lacrosse Association ==
The Central Collegiate Lacrosse Association merged with the Pioneer Collegiate Lacrosse League before the 2019 season.

== Continental Lacrosse Conference ==
=== Division 1 ===
- Boston College; Chestnut Hill, Massachusetts
- University at Buffalo (SUNY-Buffalo); Buffalo, New York
- University of Connecticut; Storrs, Connecticut
- University of New Hampshire; Durham, New Hampshire
- Northeastern University; Boston, Massachusetts
- Pittsburgh: Pittsburgh, Pennsylvania
- Syracuse University; Syracuse, New York
- Temple: Philadelphia, Pennsylvania

=== Division 2 ===
- Bridgewater State University; Bridgewater, Massachusetts
- Central Connecticut State University; New Britain, Connecticut
- Columbia University; New York City, New York
- University of Maine; Orono, Maine
- University of Rhode Island; Kingston, Rhode Island
- Southern Connecticut State University; New Haven, Connecticut
- Stonehill College; Easton, Massachusetts
- University of Massachusetts, Dartmouth; Dartmouth, Massachusetts

=== Division 3 ===
- Fitchburg State University; Fitchburg, Massachusetts
- Framingham State University; Framingham, Massachusetts
- Worcester Polytechnic Institute; Worcester, Massachusetts
- Worcester State University; Worcester, Massachusetts

== Great Rivers Lacrosse Conference ==
The Great Rivers Lacrosse Conference merged with the Upper Midwest Lacrosse Conference and Lone Star Alliance before the 2019 season.

== Lone Star Alliance ==
=== Division 1 ===
- Baylor: Waco, Texas
- Kansas: Lawrence, Kansas
- Louisiana State University: Baton Rouge, Louisiana
- Missouri: Columbia, Missouri
- Oklahoma: Norman, Oklahoma
- Ole Miss: Oxford, Mississippi
- Southern Methodist University: Dallas, Texas
- Texas: Austin, Texas
- Texas A&M: College Station, Texas
- Texas Christian University: Fort Worth, Texas

=== Division 2 ===
- Arkansas: Fayetteville, Arkansas
- Creighton University: Omaha, Nebraska
- Dallas Baptist: Dallas, Texas
- Drury: Springfield, Missouri
- East Texas Baptist: Marshall, Texas
- Houston: Houston, Texas
- Missouri State: Springfield, Missouri
- University of Nebraska; Lincoln, Nebraska
- North Texas: Denton, Texas
- Oklahoma State: Stillwater, Oklahoma
- Rice: Houston, Texas
- Texas–San Antonio: San Antonio, Texas
- Texas State: San Marcos, Texas
- Texas Tech University: Lubbock, Texas
- Tulane: New Orleans, Louisiana
- Washington University in St. Louis: St. Louis, Missouri

=== Division 3 ===
- Kansas State: Manhattan, Kansas
- Louisiana: Lafayette, Louisiana
- St. Edward's: Austin, Texas
- Tarleton State: Stephenville, Texas
- TAMU-Galveston: Galveston, Texas
- Texas A&M - Corps of Cadets: College Station, Texas

== Pioneer Collegiate Lacrosse League ==
The Pioneer Collegiate Lacrosse League merged with the Central Collegiate Lacrosse Association to form the Continental Lacrosse Conference.

== Pacific Northwest Collegiate Lacrosse League ==
=== Division 1 ===
- Boise State University; Boise, Idaho
- University of Oregon; Eugene, Oregon
- Oregon State University; Corvallis, Oregon
- Simon Fraser University; Burnaby, British Columbia
- University of Washington; Seattle, Washington
- Washington State University; Pullman, Washington

=== Division 2 ===
- Central Washington University; Ellensburg, Washington
- Gonzaga University; Spokane, Washington
- College of Idaho; Caldwell, Idaho
- University of Idaho; Moscow, Idaho
- University of Montana; Missoula, Montana
- Pacific Lutheran University; Tacoma, Washington
- University of Puget Sound; Tacoma, Washington
- Western Oregon University; Monmouth, Oregon
- Western Washington University; Bellingham, Washington

== Rocky Mountain Lacrosse Conference ==
=== Division 1 ===
- Brigham Young University; Provo, Utah
- University of Colorado; Boulder, Colorado
- Colorado State University; Fort Collins, Colorado
- University of Utah; Salt Lake City, Utah
- Utah Tech; St. George, Utah
- Utah Valley University; Orem, Utah

=== Division 2 ===
- Air Force Academy; Colorado Springs, Colorado
- Colorado School of Mines; Golden, Colorado
- University of Denver; Denver, Colorado
- Metropolitan State University of Denver; Denver, Colorado
- Montana State University; Bozeman, Montana
- Southern Utah University; Cedar City, Utah
- Utah State University; Logan, Utah
- University of Wyoming; Laramie, Wyoming

=== Division 3 ===
- Fort Lewis College; Durango, Colorado
- University of New Mexico; Albuquerque, New Mexico
- University of Northern Colorado; Greeley, Colorado
- Western Colorado University; Gunnison, Colorado

== SouthEastern Lacrosse Conference ==
Several teams in the Mid-Atlantic Region separated from the Southeastern Lacrosse Conference in 2020 to create the Atlantic Lacrosse Conference, along with Mississippi schools leaving to join the Lonestar Alliance Conference.

=== Division 1 ===
- University of Alabama; Tuscaloosa, Alabama
- Auburn University; Auburn, Alabama
- University of Central Florida; Orlando, Florida
- University of Florida; Gainesville, Florida
- Florida State University; Tallahassee, Florida
- University of Georgia; Athens, Georgia
- Georgia Tech; Atlanta, Georgia
- Jacksonville University; Jacksonville, Florida
- University of South Carolina; Columbia, South Carolina

=== Division 2 ===
- Florida Atlantic University; Boca Raton, Florida
- Florida Gulf Coast University; Fort Myers, Florida
- Georgia Southern University; Statesboro, Georgia
- Kennesaw State University; Kennesaw, Georgia
- University of Miami; Coral Gables, Florida
- University of North Florida; Jacksonville, Florida
- University of South Florida; Tampa, Florida
- University of Tampa; Tampa, Florida

== Southwestern Lacrosse Conference ==
=== Division 1 ===
- University of Arizona; Tucson, Arizona
- Arizona State University; Tempe, Arizona
- University of California, Los Angeles; Los Angeles, California
- Chapman University; Orange, California
- Grand Canyon University; Phoenix, Arizona
- San Diego State University; San Diego, California
- University of Southern California; Los Angeles, California

=== Division 2 ===
- Arizona Christian University; Glendale, Arizona
- California State University–San Marcos; San Marcos, California
- University of California–San Diego; San Diego, California
- Loyola Marymount University; Los Angeles, California
- Northern Arizona University; Flagstaff, Arizona
- University of San Diego; San Diego, California
- Whittier College; Whittier, California

=== Division 3 ===
- Biola University; La Mirada, California
- California State University–Fullerton; Fullerton, California
- University of California–Irvine; Irvine, California
- Claremont Colleges; Claremont, California
- Long Beach State University; Long Beach, California
- Moorpark College; Moorpark, California
- Santa Barbara City College; Santa Barbara, California

== Upper Midwest Lacrosse Conference ==
=== Division 1 ===
- University of Illinois; Urbana, Illinois
- Indiana University; Bloomington, Indiana
- Iowa State University; Ames, Iowa
- Miami University; Oxford, Ohio
- Michigan State University; East Lansing, Michigan
- University of Minnesota; Minneapolis, Minnesota
- Purdue University; West Lafayette, Indiana
- Western Michigan University; Kalamazoo, Michigan

=== Division 2 ===
- Central Michigan University; Mount Pleasant, Michigan
- University of Dayton; Dayton, Ohio
- Grand Valley State University; Allendale, Michigan
- University of Minnesota–Duluth; Duluth, Minnesota
- North Dakota State University; Fargo, North Dakota
- Saint John's University; Collegeville, Minnesota
- University of St. Thomas; St. Paul, Minnesota

== Western Collegiate Lacrosse League ==
=== Division 1 ===
- University of California; Berkeley, California
- University of California, Santa Barbara; Santa Barbara, California
- California Polytechnic State University; San Luis Obispo, California
- University of Nevada; Reno, Nevada
- Santa Clara University; Santa Clara, California
- Sonoma State University; Rohnert Park, California
- Stanford University; Stanford, California

=== Division 2 ===
- California State University, Chico; Chico, California
- University of California-Davis; Davis, California
- University of California–Santa Cruz; Santa Cruz, California
- Humboldt State University; Arcata, California
- Saint Mary's College; Moraga, California
- San Jose State University; San Jose, California
