= MCLA =

MCLA is an abbreviation that may refer to:

- Massachusetts College of Liberal Arts
- Men's Collegiate Lacrosse Association
- Midnight Club: Los Angeles
