= Atlantic Lacrosse Conference =

Lacrosse conference in the United States

- Association: Men's Collegiate Lacrosse Association
- Sport: College Lacrosse
- Founded: 2020
- President: Brett Hewitt
- Divisions: 2
- No. of teams: 22
- Most recent champions: Division 1: Virginia Tech (3rd Title); Division 2: UNC Wilmington (1st title) (2026)
- Most titles: Division 1: Liberty & Virginia Tech (Tied at 3 Titles); Division 2: UNC Charlotte (3 Titles)
- Website: https://mcla.us/conference/alc

The Atlantic Lacrosse Conference (ALC) is a lacrosse conference in the United States that participates in the Men's Collegiate Lacrosse Association (MCLA). The ALC operates in the U.S. states of Kentucky, West Virginia, Virginia, Tennessee, North Carolina and South Carolina and is split into two divisions, Division I and Division II. The conference is governed by an executive board and the team that wins the conference's divisional playoffs receive an automatic bid to the MCLA National Championship.

== History ==
At the end of the 2020 season, the MCLA Board of Directors announced that they voted to split the SouthEastern Lacrosse Conference (SELC), resulting in the founding of a new conference, which would become the Atlantic Lacrosse Conference. Its founding members were Clemson, East Carolina, George Washington, Liberty, North Carolina State, Tennessee, Virginia Tech and West Virginia.

At the end of the 2021 season, the ALC announced its intentions to expand and create a division 2 component to the conference. The founding division 2 teams were Appalachian State, Coastal Carolina, Elon, UNC-Charlotte, UNC-Wilmington and Wake Forest, all of which moved over from the SELC. It was also announced at that time that Pittsburgh and Temple had moved from the Continental Lacrosse Conference (CLC) to the ALC, joining its Division 1 teams.

The 2023 season added three new division 2 teams, College of Charleston, The Citadel, and Davidson College, all whom moved over from the SELC. The 2024 season added the College of William & Mary, Longwood University, and a division-2 team for Virginia Tech.

In 2025, Longwood University left the conference. However, three new teams were added to division 1, University of Kentucky, University of North Carolina - Chapel Hill, and High Point University.

Prior to the 2026 season, Pittsburgh and Temple left the ALC to join the Continental Lacrosse Conference (CLC). High Point University moved down to division 2.

== Teams ==
Institution	Location	Enrollment	Nickname	Joined
Division I
Clemson University	Clemson, South Carolina	27,341	Tigers	2021
James Madison University	Harrisonburg, Virginia	22,166	Dukes	2022
University of Kentucky	Lexington, Kentucky	38,719	Wildcats	2025
Liberty University	Lynchburg, Virginia	95,148	Flames	2022
University of North Carolina - Chapel Hill	Chapel Hill, North Carolina	32,400	Tarheels	2025
North Carolina State University	Raleigh, North Carolina	36,831	Wolfpack	2021
University of Tennessee	Knoxville, Tennessee	31,701	Volunteers	2021
Virginia Tech	Blacksburg, Virginia	37,279	Hokies	2021
West Virginia University	Morgantown, West Virginia	25,474	Mountaineers	2021
Division II
Appalachian State University	Boone, North Carolina	20,641	Mountaineers	2022
The Citadel	Charleston, South Carolina	3,693	Bulldogs	2023
Coastal Carolina University	Conway, South Carolina	10,473	Chanticleers	2022
College of Charleston	Charleston, South Carolina	10,941	Cougars	2023
College of William & Mary	Williamsburg, Virginia	9.517	Tribe	2024
Davidson College	Davidson, North Carolina	1,973	Wildcats	2023
East Carolina University	Greenville, North Carolina	28,021	Pirates	2021
Elon University	Elon, North Carolina	7,127	Phoenix	2022
High Point University	High Point, North Carolina	6,550	Panthers	2025
University of North Carolina–Charlotte	Charlotte, North Carolina	30,448	49ers	2022
University of North Carolina–Wilmington	Wilmington, North Carolina	18,030	Seahawks	2022
Virginia Tech (DII)	Blacksburg, Virginia	37,279	Hokies	2024
Wake Forest University	Winston-Salem, North Carolina	8,947	Demon Deacons	2022

== Conference Champions ==
Division 1
Season	Champion	Score	Runner-up	Link
2021	Liberty	17-8	Clemson	
2022	Virginia Tech	18-11	Clemson	
2023	Virginia Tech	14-13^{2OT}	Liberty	
2024	Liberty	17-13	Tennessee	
2025	**Liberty**	16-8	Tennessee	
2026	Virginia Tech	11-10	Tennessee	

Note: Bold text denotes MCLA National Champion. Italic text denotes MCLA National Champion runner-up.

Division 2
Season	Champion	Score	Runner-up	Link
2022	UNC Charlotte	16-8	Coastal Carolina	
2023	UNC Charlotte	11-9	Coastal Carolina	
2024	UNC Charlotte	14-9	Wake Forest	
2025	Wake Forest	14-9	Virginia Tech	
2026	UNC Wilmington	11-9	Coastal Carolina	
