= 2015 MCLA tournament =

The 2015 MCLA tournament is the 19th annual single-elimination tournament to determine the national championship for Men's Collegiate Lacrosse Association (MCLA). The tournament is being held in Irvine, CA for the second year in a row, hosted by Chapman University. 16 Division 1 teams and 16 Division 2 teams will be selected to compete in two different brackets of the tournament based upon their performance during the regular season, and for some, by means of a conference tournament automatic qualifier.

== Division 1 bracket ==
First round May 11
1	Grand Canyon	22
16	Purdue	8
8	Oregon State	5
9	Cal Poly	8
5	BYU	10
12	Stanford	11
4	Chapman	16
13	Michigan State	2
3	Colorado	8
14	Texas State	5
6	Westminster	7
11	Georgia Tech	9
7	Virginia Tech	9
10	SDSU	7
2	Arizona St	15
15	UCONN	5

Quarterfinals; May 12
1	Grand Canyon	9
9	Cal Poly	5
12	Stanford	3
4	Chapman	14
3	Colorado	12
11	Georgia Tech	7
7	Virginia Tech	10*
2	Arizona St	9

Semifinals; May 14
1	Grand Canyon	11
4	Chapman	8
3	Colorado	12*
7	Virginia Tech	11

Final; May 16
1	Grand Canyon	9
3	Colorado	8

* = Overtime

== Division 1 tournament appearances ==
Team	Appearances	Years
Grand Canyon	3	2012, (Note: Competed in MCLA D2 Tournament.) 2013, 2015
ASU	8	2007, 2008, 2010, 2011, 2012, 2013, 2014, 2015
Colorado	9	2006, 2007, 2009, 2010, 2011, 2012, 2013, 2014, 2015
Chapman	8	2008, 2009, 2010, 2011, 2012, 2013, 2014, 2015
BYU	13	1997, 1998, 2005, 2006, 2007, 2008, 2009, 2010, 2011, 2012, 2013, 2014, 2015
Westminster	9	2007, 2008, 2009, 2010, 2011, 2012, 2013, (Note: Competed in MCLA D2 tournament in 2007, 2008, 2009, 2010, 2011, 2012, and 2013. They won the D2 national championship in 2008.) 2014, 2015
Virginia Tech	4	2005, 2008, 2014, 2015
Oregon State	2	2013, 2015
Cal Poly	9	2002, 2004, 2006, 2009, 2010, 2011, 2012, 2014, 2015
SDSU	1	2015
Georgia Tech	2	2004, 2015
Stanford	3	2001, 2013, 2015
Michigan State	6	2010, 2011, 2012, 2013, 2014, 2015
Texas State	2	2010, 2015
UCONN	1	2015
Purdue	2	2013, 2015

== Results ==
This marks the first national championship for Grand Canyon University in only their 4th year in the MCLA Division 1. Previously to competing in the MCLA, GCU was an NCAA II program.

== Division 2 bracket ==
First Round; May 11
1	Concordia	16
16	Briarcliffe	11
8	St. John's	15
9	Grove City	13
5	Grand Valley State	9
12	Western Washington	10*
4	North Dakota State	13
13	Sierra Nevada	8
3	Missouri Valley	7
14	Siena Heights	8
6	Dayton	20
11	Kennesaw State	6
7	Florida Gulf Coast	9
10	CSU Fullerton	8
2	St. Thomas	21
15	Utah State	14

Quarterfinals; May 12
1	Concordia	14
8	St. John's	12
12	Western Washington	12*
4	North Dakota State	11
14	Siena Heights	6
6	Dayton	7*
7	Florida Gulf Coast	6
2	St. Thomas	16

Semifinals; May 14
1	Concordia	15
12	Western Washington	8
6	Dayton	13
2	St. Thomas	12

Final; May 16
1	Concordia	11
6	Dayton	12

* = Overtime
