= Pioneer Collegiate Lacrosse League =

- Conference: MCLA
- Founded: 1986
- Ceased: 2017
- Commissioner: Dan Morris
- Sports fielded: College lacrosse
- No. of teams: 15
- Headquarters: Durham, New Hampshire
- Region: New England
- Official website: http://mcla.us/PCLL/

The Pioneer Collegiate Lacrosse League (PCLL) was a conference in the Men's Collegiate Lacrosse Association (MCLA). The PCLL primarily incorporates teams in New England and New York and is divided into two divisions, Division 1 and Division 2 (formerly A & B). The conference is governed by a five-member executive board and the teams that win the conference's divisional playoffs receive bids to the MCLA National Tournament. Before the 2019 season, the conference merged with the Central Collegiate Lacrosse Association (CCLA) to form the Continental Lacrosse Conference (CLC).

== History ==
In the spring of 1984, players from 15 colleges competed in a club All-Star game held at Dean College. It was during this event that the idea of hosting a New England college club championship germinated. Over the next year meetings between the club lacrosse programs in the New England region were held and by the spring of 1986, four teams gathered at Dean College for a single elimination tournament. In the semi-final match-ups, Boston University defeated the University of Connecticut, 6-5, and Dean College defeated the University of Rhode Island, 14-2. That same day, Dean College became the first "New England Club Champion", defeating Boston University by a score of 6-5.

After two years of successful tournaments, six teams petitioned the US Intercollegiate Lacrosse Association (USILA) and the New England Intercollegiate Lacrosse Association (NEILA) for sanctioning of the league. In 1987, Assumption College, Bentley College, Clark University, Dean College, Roger Williams University and Worcester Polytechnic Institute founded the Patriot Lacrosse League. The league's original purpose was to provide structure and legitimacy to the member teams, hoping their institutions would elevate them to varsity status. Five of those six founding Patriot League members were able to obtain their goal. During the spring of 1988, the first Patriot League Championship was played. Dean College defeated Bentley 18-9.

The following year, although Roger Williams departed, the University of Rhode Island and Bryant College were accepted into the league. In the spring of 1990, University of Connecticut and Northeastern University joined the league and at the USILA's request to avoid confusion with the NCAA's Patriot League, the league changed its name to the Pioneer Lacrosse League.

The Pioneer operated along the same lines for the next several seasons. Teams left the league to compete at the varsity level in the NCAA while new teams joined to fill their place. In the fall of 2000, the league underwent a major change by officially joining what was then known as the US Lacrosse Intercollegiate Associates (USLIA). That same year, the University of New Hampshire defeated Boston University to earn the league's first automatic qualification and represent the PCLL at its first national tournament as members of the USLIA. In St. Louis, Missouri. In 2006 the USLIA became the Men's Collegiate Lacrosse Association (MCLA).

In August 2018, the MCLA announced its intention to merge the Pioneer Collegiate Lacrosse League and the Central Collegiate Lacrosse League (CCLA) to form a new conference, the Continental Lacrosse Conference (CLC).

== Championship records ==
=== Division I ===
Division I champions
Year	League champion	Runner-up	Score	National tournament results
New England club champion
1986	Dean College	Boston	6-5	N/A
1987	Boston			N/A
Patriot Lacrosse League
1988	Dean College	Bentley	18-5	N/A
1989				
1990				
1991				
Pioneer Lacrosse League (independent)
1992	Rhode Island			N/A
1993	Rhode Island			N/A
1994	Dean College			N/A
1995	Dean College			N/A
1996				
1997				
1998				
1999	Coast Guard Academy			N/A
Pioneer Collegiate Lacrosse League (MCLA conference)
2000	New Hampshire	Boston	16-8	lost in first round to Brigham Young University
2001	Rhode Island	New Hampshire	14-10	lost in first round to Colorado State University
2002	New Hampshire	Connecticut	10-4	lost in first round to Sonoma State University
2003	Boston College	New Hampshire	11-10	lost in first round to Colorado State University
2004	Boston College	New Hampshire	14-8	lost in first round to University of Oregon
2005	Northeastern	New Hampshire	15-12	lost in first round to University of Michigan
2006	Northeastern	New Hampshire	8-4	lost in first round to Sonoma State University
2007	Northeastern	Boston College	8-4	lost in second round to UC Santa Barbara
2008	Boston College	Boston	12-4	lost in first round to Brigham Young University
2009	Boston College	Northeastern	9-8	lost in first round to University of Minnesota Duluth
2010	Boston College	New Hampshire	10-9	lost in first round to Colorado State University
2011	SUNY-Buffalo	Boston College	5-3	lost in first round to Arizona State University
2012	SUNY-Buffalo	Northeastern	9-6	lost in second round to Arizona State University
2013	Boston College	Connecticut	10-4	lost in first round to Sonoma State University
2014	Northeastern	New Hampshire	12-5	lost in first round to Chapman University
2015	Connecticut	New Hampshire	9-2	lost in first round to Arizona State University
2016	Boston College	Connecticut	14-5	lost in second round to Grand Canyon University
2017	Northeastern	New Hampshire	10-9	lost in first round to eventual champion Grand Canyon University

Division 1 records
Team	Championships	Championship years	Runner-up	Runner-up years
Boston College	7	2003, 2004, 2008, 2009, 2010, 2013, 2016	2	2007, 2011
Dean College	4	1986, 1988, 1994, 1995		
Rhode Island	3	1992, 1993, 2001		
New Hampshire	2	2000, 2002	9	2001, 2003, 2004, 2005, 2006, 2010, 2014, 2015 2017
SUNY-Buffalo	2	2011, 2012		
Northeastern	2	2014, 2017	2	2009, 2012
Boston	1	1987	2	2000, 2008
Coast Guard Academy	1	1999		
Connecticut	1	2015	3	2002, 2013, 2016
Bentley			1	1988

=== Division II ===
Division II champions
Year	League champion	Runner-up	Score	National tournament results
2004	No championship held^{1}			
2005	Coast Guard Academy	Framingham State	10-6	Did not attend^{2}
2006	Salem State College	New Haven	10-8	Did not attend
2007	Salem State College	Framingham State	15-10	Did not attend^{3}
2008	Central Connecticut State	Coast Guard Academy	5-4	Did not attend
2009	Stonehill College	Briarcliffe College	4-3	lost in first round to University of Northern Colorado
2010	Briarcliffe College	Stonehill College	14-6	lost in first round to Utah Valley University
2011	Briarcliffe College	Coast Guard Academy	13-6	lost in second round to Davenport University
2012	Briarcliffe College	Coast Guard Academy	9-8 OT	lost in first round to North Dakota State University
2013	Briarcliffe College	Coast Guard Academy	9-7	lost in first round to Westminster College Coast Guard Academy lost in second round to University of St. Thomas^{4}
2014	Coast Guard Academy	Briarcliffe College	15-6	lost in first round to University of Dayton
2015	Briarcliffe College	Bridgewater State	10-9	lost in first round to Concordia University Irvine
2016	Bridgewater State	Southern Connecticut State	15-7	lost in first round to eventual champion University of St. Thomas
2017	Bridgewater State	Central Connecticut State	9-7	lost in first round to Grand Valley State University

^{1} Division B only included one team (University of New Haven) in 2004 and therefore did not have playoffs.
^{2} The PCLL(B) did not receive an automatic bid to nationals.

^{3} The PCLL(B) did not receive an automatic bid to nationals.

^{4} Coast Guard Academy received an at-large bid to nationals.

Division II records
Team	Championships	Championship years	Runner-up	Runner-up years
Briarcliffe College	5	2010, 2011, 2012, 2013, 2015	1	2009
Salem State College	2	2006, 2007		
Coast Guard Academy	2	2005, 2014	4	2008, 2011, 2012, 2013
Bridgewater State	2	2016, 2017		
Central Connecticut State	1	2008	1	2017
Stonehill College	1	2009	1	2010
Framingham State			2	2005, 2007
New Haven			1	2006
Southern Connecticut State			1	2016

== Final Teams ==
=== Division 1 ===
Institution	Location	Founded	Affiliation	Enrollment	Team Nickname	Primary conference
Boston College	Chestnut Hill, Massachusetts	1863	Private/Catholic	14,395	Eagles	ACC (Division I)
University of Connecticut	Storrs, Connecticut	1881	Public	20,846	Huskies	Big East Conference (Division I)
University of New Hampshire	Durham, New Hampshire	1809	Public	20,126	Wildcats	America East (Division I)
Northeastern University	Boston, Massachusetts	1898	Private/Non-sectarian	21,000	Huskies	CAA (Division I)
University of Rhode Island	Kingston, Rhode Island	1892	Public	19,095	Rams	Atlantic 10 (Division I)
SUNY-Buffalo	Buffalo, New York	1846	Public	28,601	Bulls	MAC (Division I)

=== Division 2 ===
Institution	Location	Founded	Affiliation	Enrollment	Team Nickname	Primary conference
University of Bridgeport	Bridgeport, Connecticut	1927	Public	2,897	Purple Knights	ECC (Division II)
Bridgewater State University	Bridgewater, Massachusetts	1840	Public	9,628	Bears	MASCAC (Division III)
Central Connecticut State University	New Britain, Connecticut	1849	Public	12,233	Blue Devil	NEC (Division I)
Framingham State University	Framingham, Massachusetts	1839	Public	6,429	Rams	MASCAC (Division III)
University of New Haven	West Haven, Connecticut	1920	Private/Non-sectarian	5,233	Chargers	Northeast Ten (Division II)
Southern Connecticut State University	New Haven, Connecticut	1893	Public	12,326	Owls	Northeast Ten (Division II)
Stonehill College	Easton, Massachusetts	1948	Private/Catholic	2,426	Skyhawks	Northeast Ten (Division II)
Westfield State University	Westfield, Massachusetts	1838	Public	4,900	Owls	MASCAC (Division III)
Worcester Polytechnic Institute	Worcester, Massachusetts	1865	Private/Non-sectarian	4,556	Engineers	NEWMAC (Division III)

== Former teams ==
- Assumption College (Worcester, Massachusetts)
- Bentley College (Waltham, Massachusetts)
- Bryant College (Smithfield, Rhode Island)
- Clark University (Worcester, Massachusetts)
- Dean College (Franklin, Massachusetts)
- New York University (New York City, New York)
- Roger Williams University (Bristol, Rhode Island)
- Salem State College (Salem, Massachusetts)
- University of Massachusetts Lowell (Lowell, Massachusetts)
- University of Rochester (Rochester, New York)
- University of Vermont (Burlington, Vermont)
- Framingham State College (Framingham, Massachusetts)
- Boston University (Boston, Massachusetts)
