= Central Collegiate Lacrosse Association =

- Conference: Men's Collegiate Lacrosse Association
- Founded: 1972
- Ceased: 2018
- Commissioner: Sean Buzzard
- Sports fielded: College lacrosse
- No. of teams: 10
- Region: Midwest and Great Lakes
- Official website: http://mcla.us/CCLA/

The Central Collegiate Lacrosse Association (CCLA) was a lacrosse-only athletic conference affiliated with the Men's Collegiate Lacrosse Association (MCLA). The CCLA incorporates teams in Michigan, Minnesota, Ohio, and Pennsylvania. On August 8, 2018, the conference commissioners of the Central Collegiate Lacrosse Association and the Pioneer Collegiate Lacrosse League announced they would merge the conferences to form the Continental Lacrosse Conference.

== History ==
The Central Collegiate Lacrosse Association was founded in 1972 as the Big Ten Lacrosse League. In 1999 the Big Ten Lacrosse League began accepting members outside of Big Ten schools. The CCLA is one of the original MCLA conferences and at one point included schools across the Midwestern United States. In 2002, schools from the southwestern portion of the conference left to form the Great Rivers Lacrosse Conference. The current CCLA includes 10 teams split into two Divisions with the top programs and larger schools in Division I and smaller schools and programs in Division II.

Michigan won three straight MCLA DI Champions in 2008, 2009, and 2010 while the program was a member of the CCLA. In 2011 the university announced a move to the NCAA Division I level, ending the Wolverines long run of consecutive CCLA conference championships at 11.

At the Division II level the CCLA has been represented in the MCLA DII Championship in 2008 when Grand Valley State lost 17–10 to Westminster College and in 2009 Dayton lost to the University of St. Thomas 11–16. In the 2011 MCLA Division II Championship Davenport defeated St. Thomas 14–9.

== Division I ==
Seven institutions make up the CCLA Division I. All of the CCLA DI members are members of NCAA Division I except Davenport University. Currently the CCLA DI league includes two teams from the Mid-American Conference, two teams from Big Ten Conference, one team from the Atlantic Coast Conference, one team from the Great Lakes Intercollegiate Athletic Conference, and one team from the Horizon League.

Institution	Location	Founded	Affiliation	Undergraduates	Team Nickname	Primary conference
University of Minnesota	Minneapolis, Minnesota	1851	Public	29,000	Golden Gophers	Big Ten (Division I)
Oakland University	Auburn Hills, Michigan	1957	Public	17,000	Golden Grizzlies	Horizon (Division I)

== Division II ==
There are three members of the CCLA Division II conference.

Institution	Location	Founded	Affiliation	Undergraduates	Team Nickname	Primary conference
University of Dayton	Dayton, Ohio	1850	Private/Catholic	8,000	Flyers	Atlantic 10 (Division I)
Grand Valley State University	Allendale, Michigan	1960	Public	22,000	Lakers	GLIAC (Division II)
Grove City College	Grove City, Pennsylvania	1876	Private/Christian	2,500	Wolverines	Presidents' (Division III)

== Former Teams ==
- Central Michigan University
- Davenport University
- Michigan State University
- University of Pittsburgh
- Western Michigan University
- Northern Michigan University
