= Men's Collegiate Lacrosse Association =

Organization for non-NCAA college lacrosse

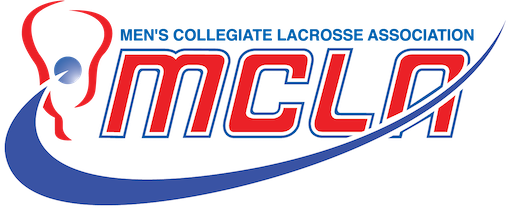
- Formerly: US Lacrosse Men's Division of Intercollegiate Associates (1980's-2006)
- Sport: Field lacrosse
- Founded: 2006; 20 years ago
- President: Ken Lovic (2013–present)
- No. of teams: 200+
- Country: United States, Canada
- Most recent champions: Division I: BYU (6th title); Division II: Grand Valley State (2nd title) (2026)
- Most titles: Division I: Colorado State & BYU (Tied at 6 titles); Division II: St. Thomas (MN) (7 titles)
- Website: mcla.us

The Men's Collegiate Lacrosse Association (MCLA) is a national organization of non-NCAA men's college lacrosse programs. The MCLA oversees game play and conducts national championships for over 200 teams in ten conferences throughout the United States and Canada. The MCLA provides a governing structure much like the NCAA, with eligibility rules, All-Americans and a national tournament to decide national champions in both Divisions I and II.

The MCLA exists to provide a quality college lacrosse experience where varsity NCAA lacrosse does not exist. On an individual scale, the MCLA provides rules and a structure that promotes "virtual varsity" lacrosse, or an experience paralleling that of NCAA programs. While the MCLA provides a high level of athletic competition, it is one of the few governing bodies that does not have a national GPA requirement for its athletes. On a national scale, the MCLA provides the infrastructure to support a level playing field through eligibility rules and enforcement and the use of NCAA rules of play. The MCLA, an organization governing a mere 70 teams in 1997, has seen a rapid growth in affiliation as national interest in the sport of lacrosse continues to increase. As of the 2014 season, participation has increased to 210 teams.

== History ==
The MCLA was formerly known as the US Lacrosse Men's Division of Intercollegiate Associates (USL MDIA). The MCLA was created by the MDIA Board of Directors and its creation was announced by US Lacrosse on August 24, 2006.

MCLA President John Paul was interviewed in a podcast on August 31, 2006. Information obtained from this interview includes:

- MDIA council will cease to exist
- MCLA will run its own national tournament and control its own budget
- MCLA membership will still sit on US Lacrosse boards and committees
- Team dues will be doubled from $500 to $1,000, the only significant impact to teams
- By-Laws are being rewritten to be ratified in January 2007
- Two new vice president positions have been formed in the MCLA Executive Board and some paid positions will be created
- Long-term goals include a full-time paid League Executive Director who will answer to the Executive Board
- Executive Boards of MCLA and conferences will be insured, as will the national tournament, however, players and teams are responsible for their own individual insurance

== Media coverage ==
The MCLA receives significant print coverage from US Lacrosse's Lacrosse Magazine and Inside Lacrosse. Inside Lacrosse acquired the license agreement from The Lax Mag in 2012 and devoted further coverage with weekly web editorial and podcasts. In efforts to promote the sport, the MCLA has also made strides to make lacrosse games available to a larger audience. In partnership with The Lacrosse Network (TLN) select games are available to viewers with streaming live feed. In the 2012 National Championship, 26 games from the tournament were broadcast live, exclusively on the MCLA tournament website while the Division II Finals, Division I Semifinals and Division I Championship were televised nationally on Fox College Sports. Additional coverage is occasionally featured on ESPN, LaxPower.com, various blogs and other news websites.

== Milestones ==
Colorado State University holds the record for most MCLA championships won with six (1999, 2001, 2003, 2006, 2012 and 2013). The Rams also hold the distinction of sending the first MCLA player into Major League Lacrosse when goaltender Alex Smith made the roster of Denver Outlaws from 2006 to 2010. Brigham Young (1997, 2000, 2007, 2011, 2021) is second in MCLA history with five national titles.

The University of Michigan Varsity Club Lacrosse Team became the first team in MCLA history to complete a perfect season by defeating Chapman University in the national championship game on May 17, 2008. The Wolverines were able to repeat their success the following season by once again going undefeated and beating Chapman University in the national championship game on May 16, 2009.

In 2008, Brekan Kohlitz of the University of Michigan became the first MCLA player drafted to the MLL by the Washington Bayhawks.

In 2010, Connor Martin of Chapman University, a two-time All American and Offensive Player of the Year, was drafted by the Denver Outlaws. In his debut for the Outlaws, he scored a hat-trick and recorded an assist, earning him MLL Rookie of the Week. In 2014 Cam Holding became the second player ever to play in the MCLA to get drafted into the MLL by the Chesapeake Bayhawks. He currently plays for the Denver Outlaws and recently won a gold medal in the 2014 FIL World Lacrosse Championship with team Canada.

The 2009-2011 MCLA Championships were held at Dick's Sporting Goods Park in Commerce City, Colorado.

In 2011, with the conclusion of the agreement between the MCLA and Dick's Sporting Goods Park, the MCLA selected a new home for the National Championships. The 2012, 2013 MCLA Championships were relocated to a new venue; Sirrine Stadium in Greenville, South Carolina.

The 2014, MCLA National Championships were held in Southern California. The opening two rounds were played at UC Irvine in Orange County and the semifinals and finals at Chapman University in Orange, CA. Two first-time champions were crowned, Colorado (DI) and Grand Valley State (DII).

== MCLA Conferences ==
The MCLA separates teams into divisions (I or II) based upon performance history, and regional conferences.

=== Current conferences ===
- Atlantic Lacrosse Conference (2021–present)
- Continental Lacrosse Conference (2019–present)
- Lone Star Alliance (1976–present)
- Pacific Northwest Collegiate Lacrosse League (1997–present)
- Rocky Mountain Lacrosse Conference (1976–present)
- SouthEastern Lacrosse Conference (1988–present)
- Southwestern Lacrosse Conference (2008–present)
- Upper Midwest Lacrosse Conference (1992–present)
- Western Collegiate Lacrosse League (1980–present)

=== Defunct conferences ===
- Central Collegiate Lacrosse Association (1972–2018)
- Great Rivers Lacrosse Conference (2002–2017)
- Pioneer Collegiate Lacrosse League (1986–2018)

== National Championship ==
The National Championships are held in May, featuring 16 qualifying teams from each division in a single-elimination contest to decide the National Champions. Each of the nine conference champions of the regular season receives an automatic bid to the National Tournament. The remaining seven teams to qualify for the tournament are selected by an at large process by the MCLA tournament committee.

== MCLA Division I Championship history ==
(called Division A through 2007)

Year	Champion	Score	Defeated	Location
1997	#4 Brigham Young	15-13	#3 UC Santa Barbara	St. Louis, Missouri
1998	#2 California	16-15^{OT}	#1 Brigham Young	St. Louis, Missouri
1999	#3 Colorado State	15-11	#5 Simon Fraser	St. Louis, Missouri
2000	#6 Brigham Young	17-13	#4 Colorado State	St. Louis, Missouri
2001	#3 Colorado State	16-7	#12 Stanford	St. Louis, Missouri
2002	#1 Sonoma State	13-10	#3 Colorado State	St. Louis, Missouri
2003	#2 Colorado State	6-4	#1 UC Santa Barbara	St. Louis, Missouri
2004	#1 UC Santa Barbara	8-7	#2 Colorado State	St. Louis, Missouri
2005	#2 UC Santa Barbara	8-7	#4 Sonoma State	Blaine, Minnesota
2006	#1 Colorado State	8-7	#3 Colorado	Plano, Texas
2007	#1 Brigham Young	16-9	#3 Oregon	Frisco, Texas
2008	#1 Michigan	14-11	#2 Chapman	Irving, Texas
2009	#1 Michigan	12-11	#3 Chapman	Denver, Colorado
2010	#1 Michigan	12-11	#3 Arizona State	Denver, Colorado
2011	#3 Brigham Young	10-8	#5 Arizona State	Denver, Colorado
2012	#2 Colorado State	7-5	#1 Cal Poly	Greenville, South Carolina
2013	#1 Colorado State	7-2	#2 Colorado	Greenville, South Carolina
2014	#2 Colorado	13-12	#1 Arizona State	Irvine & Orange, California
2015	#1 Grand Canyon	9-8	#3 Colorado	Irvine & Orange, California
2016	#1 Chapman	9-5	#2 Cal Poly	Irvine & Orange, California
2017	#2 Grand Canyon	12-8	#9 Chapman	Irvine & Orange, California
2018	#3 Michigan State	10-8	#1 Chapman	Salt Lake City, Utah
2019	#3 South Carolina	13-8	#1 California	Salt Lake City, Utah
2020	No Championship Series due to COVID-19 pandemic			
2021	#2W Brigham Young*	16-9	#1W Chapman	Round Rock, Texas
2022	#3 South Carolina	11-9	#8 Georgia Tech	Round Rock, Texas
2023	#7 Concordia Irvine	17-10	#1 Virginia Tech	Round Rock, Texas
2024	#1 Brigham Young	13-5	#14 Utah Valley	Round Rock, Texas
2025	#1 Liberty	17-11	#3 Georgia Tech	Round Rock, Texas
2026	#1 Brigham Young	16-13	#3 Virginia Tech	Midlothian, Virginia

*Postseason play contained top 8 teams. Hosted as "MCLA Invitational" rather than as a national championship.

Team	Championships	Winning years	Runner up	Runner up Years
Colorado State	6	1999, 2001, 2003, 2006, 2012, 2013	3	2000, 2002, 2004
Brigham Young	6	1997, 2000, 2007, 2011, 2024, 2026	1	1998
Michigan	3	2008, 2009, 2010		
UC Santa Barbara	2	2004, 2005	2	1997, 2003
Grand Canyon	2	2015, 2017		
South Carolina	2	2019, 2022		
California	1	1998	1	2019
Sonoma State	1	2002	1	2005
Colorado	1	2014	3	2006, 2013, 2015
Chapman	1	2016	4	2008, 2009, 2017, 2018
Michigan State	1	2018		
Concordia Irvine	1	2023		
Liberty	1	2025		
Arizona State			3	2010, 2011, 2014
Cal Poly			2	2012, 2016
Georgia Tech			2	2022, 2025
Virginia Tech			2	2023, 2026
Simon Fraser			1	1999
Stanford			1	2001
Oregon			1	2007
Utah Valley			1	2024

== MCLA Division II Championship history ==
(called Division B thru 2007)

Year	Champion	Score	Defeated	Location
2005	#1 San Diego	9-6	#2 Utah Valley	Blaine, Minnesota
2006	#1 San Diego	10-3	#6 St. John's (MN)	Plano, Texas
2007	#3 Montana	15-5	#1 St. John's (MN)	Frisco, Texas
2008	#1 Westminster College	17-10	#2 Grand Valley State	Irving, Texas
2009	#2 St. Thomas (MN)	16-11	#1 Dayton	Denver, Colorado
2010	#1 St. Thomas (MN)	12-9	#3 Utah Valley	Denver, Colorado
2011	#5 Davenport (MI)	14-9	#1 St. Thomas (MN)	Denver, Colorado
2012	#1 St. Thomas (MN)	9-8	#2 Grand Valley State	Greenville, South Carolina
2013	#1 St. Thomas (MN)	9-7	#2 Westminster College	Greenville, South Carolina
2014	#1 Grand Valley State	12-11	#2 St. John's (MN)	Irvine, California
2015	#6 Dayton	12-11	#1 Concordia Irvine	Irvine, California
2016	#1 St. Thomas (MN)	10-7	#6 Grand Valley State	Irvine, California
2017	#2 Concordia Irvine	13-10	#1 St. Thomas (MN)	Irvine, California
2018	#2 North Dakota State	8-7^{2OT}	#1 St. Thomas (MN)	Salt Lake City, Utah
2019	#2 St. Thomas (MN)	9-7	#4 Dayton	Salt Lake City, Utah
2020	No Championship Series due to COVID-19 pandemic			
2021	St. Thomas (MN)*	9-6	North Dakota State	Saint Paul, Minnesota
2022	#5 Utah	13-7	#7 Rhode Island	Round Rock, Texas
2023	#9 Dayton	6-5^{OT}	#3 St. Thomas (MN)	Round Rock, Texas
2024	#4 Montana State	12–7	#2 St. Thomas (MN)	Round Rock, Texas
2025	#4 St. Thomas (MN)	10–6	#2 Grand Valley State	Round Rock, Texas
2026	#3 Grand Valley State	11–10	#1 St. Thomas (MN)	Midlothian, Virginia

*Postseason play contained top 4 teams. Hosted as "Covid Cup Invitational" rather than as a national championship.

Team	Championships	Winning years	Runner up	Runner up Years
St. Thomas (MN)	7	2009, 2010, 2012, 2013, 2016, 2019, 2025	6	2011, 2017, 2018, 2023, 2024, 2026
San Diego	2	2005, 2006		
Dayton	2	2015, 2023	1	2009, 2019
Grand Valley State	2	2014, 2026	4	2008, 2012, 2016, 2025
Montana	1	2007		
Westminster College	1	2008	1	2013
Davenport	1	2011		
Concordia Irvine	1	2017	1	2015
North Dakota State	1	2018		
Utah	1	2022		
Montana State	1	2024		
St. Johns (MN)			3	2006, 2007, 2014
Utah Valley			2	2005, 2010
Rhode Island			1	2022

== List of MCLA Statistical Leaders ==
MCLA Division I All Time Career Points Leaders (230 Minimum)

Rank	Name	Team	Points	Goals	Assists
1	Keaton Mohs	Liberty	362	191	171
2	Bryan Larocque	Davenport	345	276	69
3	Ted Ferrin	BYU	337	202	135
4	Eric Nelson	Arizona State	312	184	128
5	Brooks Baro	Georgia Tech	311	195	116
6	Ben A Towner	Simon Fraser	305	235	70
7	Ryan Westfall	Arizona State	304	164	140
8	Blake Yates	Utah Valley	303	200	103
9	Pierce Quarles	Georgia Tech	299	140	159
10	Trevor Yealy	Michigan	298	283	15
11	Corey Noonan	Florida State	298	214	84
12	David Drehoff	Central Florida	297	190	107
13	Aidan Smith	Virginia Tech	288	190	98
14	Gavin Taylor	BYU	286	199	87
15	Tyler Westfall	Arizona State	286	158	128
16	Tyler Kirkby	Simon Fraser	282	193	89
17	Jake Halversen	BYU	282	190	92
18	Garret Brennan	Clemson	282	157	125
19	Matthew T Malcolm	Texas State	279	204	75
20	Dylan Garner	Chapman	277	173	104
21	Elliot Grow	BYU	268	122	146
22	Brian Connolly	Georgia Tech	267	157	110
23	Matt Higgins	Pittsburgh	267	147	120
24	Greg Lunde	Simon Fraser	255	155	100
25	Connor Martin	Chapman	254	168	86
26	Amar Batra	Minnesota	254	141	113
27	Sam Gregory	Liberty	250	143	107
28	Mark Manning	Utah & BYU	248	151	97
29	Casey Mithun	Minn-Duluth	248	121	127
30	AJ Hepting	Texas A&M	247	164	83
31	Scott Heberer	Cal Poly	245	126	119
32	Davis Goodman	Florida State	243	139	104
33	Tim Peterson	Georgia Tech	242	115	127
34	Cooper Kehoe	Colorado State	240	154	86
35	Will Patch	Clemson	234	141	93
36	Ryan Miller	Liberty	232	134	98
37	Luke Branham	Liberty	231	142	89
38	Noah Iversen	Missouri	231	102	129

MCLA Division I All Time Career Goals Leaders (150 Minimum)

Rank	Name	Team	Goals
1	Trevor Yealy	Michigan	283
2	Bryan Larocque	Davenport	276
3	Ben A Towner	Simon Fraser	235
4	Corey Noonan	Florida State	214
5	Matthew T Malcolm	Texas State	204
6	Ted Ferrin	BYU	202
7	Blake Yates	Utah Valley	200
8	Gavin Taylor	BYU	199
9	Brooks Baro	Georgia Tech	195
10	Tyler Kirkby	Simon Fraser	193
11	Keaton Mohs	Liberty	191
12	David Drehoff	Central Florida	190
13	Matt Graupmann	Cal Poly	190
14	Aidan Smith	Virginia Tech	190
15	Jake Halversen	BYU	190
16	Owen Carlson	Minnesota	189
17	Eric Nelson	Arizona State	184
18	Dylan Garner	Chapman	173
19	Connor Martin	Chapman	168
20	AJ Hepting	Texas A&M	164
21	Ryan Westfall	Arizona State	164
22	Rory Cavanaugh	Georgia	163
23	Andrew Zeman	Florida State	160
24	Kevin Hayden	Virginia Tech	160
25	Marcus Wooden	Chapman	159
26	Cam Wengreniuk	Grand Canyon	158
27	Chris Severson	BYU	158
28	Tyler Westfall	Arizona State	158
29	Blake Day	UNLV	157
30	Brian Connolly	Georgia Tech	157
31	Garret Brennan	Clemson	157
32	Greg Lunde	Simon Fraser	155
33	Cooper Kehoe	Colorado State	154
34	Jake Marthens	Arizona State	153
35	Mark Manning	Utah & BYU	151
36	Andrew Clayton	Chapman	150

MCLA Division II All Time Career Points Leaders (230 Minimum)

Rank	Name	Team	GP	Points	PPG	Goals	Assists
1	Eric Weber	Hope	49	393	8.02	296	97
2	Jack Dumsa	GVSU	70	391	5.59	176	215
3	Chris Cole	Fullerton	75	367	4.89	214	153
4	Cameron C Holding	GVSU	52	364	7.00	266	98
5	Louis R Richman	Montana State	56	327	5.84	154	173
6	Shawn Beer	Davenport	55	311	5.65	216	95
7	Luke Tardich	GVSU	55	310	5.64	163	147
8	Mike Ansel	Fullerton	50	296	5.92	211	85
9	Austin Jenkin	Cal State San Marcos	61	296	4.85	177	119
10	Nicholas H Tkachuk	Pacific Lutheran	56	295	5.27	211	84
11	Micah Willis	Fullerton	54	292	5.41	152	140
12	Nicholas Guzzetti	College of Idaho	45	283	6.29	197	86
13	Joe M Costello	St. Thomas	68	280	4.12	178	102
14	Jordan Richtsmeier	Davenport	58	280	4.83	122	158
15	Chris Perkins	Northern Colorado	54	271	5.02	105	166
16	Greg Swanson	PBA	50	266	5.32	88	178
17	Ryan Brouwer	New Haven	48	265	5.52	161	104
18	Adam Zimmerman	Northern Arizona	52	265	5.10	149	116
19	Michael Mann	Sam Houston State	37	262	7.08	156	106
20	Alex Kowalski	Fullerton	54	256	4.74	193	63
21	John P Healy	SCAD	55	255	4.64	172	83
22	Christopher Idema	GVSU	35	255	7.29	90	165
23	Andrew C Webb	Southwestern	48	249	5.19	195	54
24	Josh Fagan	Concordia	53	247	4.66	192	55
25	Calvin Davis	Western Oregon	58	245	4.22	133	112
26	Dan Fleisher	WashU	43	243	5.65	142	101
27	Sean Mastro	Northern Arizona	54	243	4.50	133	110
28	Allen Campbell	Hope	45	243	5.40	121	122
29	Daniel Hochspeier	Western Oregon	67	242	3.61	92	150
30	Alexander Brown	Montana State	53	241	4.55	151	90
31	Kyle Boyd	Northern Colorado	54	240	4.44	179	61
32	Scott Schulze	Kennesaw State	52	240	4.62	144	96
33	Jonathan J Prichard	Biola	55	236	4.29	190	46
34	Christian A Furbay	Dayton	60	235	3.92	162	73
35	Tyler Mathews	Kennesaw State	57	231	4.05	132	99

MCLA Division II All Time Career Goals Leaders (150 Minimum)

Rank	Name	Team	GP	Goals	GPG
1	Eric Weber	Hope	49	296	6.04
2	Cameron C Holding	GVSU	52	266	5.12
3	Shawn Beer	Davenport	55	216	3.93
4	Chris Cole	Fullerton	75	214	2.85
5	Mike Ansel	Fullerton	50	211	4.22
6	Nicholas H Tkachuk	Pacific Lutheran	56	211	3.77
7	Nicholas Guzzetti	College of Idaho	45	197	4.38
8	Andrew C Webb	Southwestern	48	195	4.06
9	Alex Kowalski	Fullerton	54	193	3.57
10	Josh Fagan	Concordia	53	192	3.62
11	Jonathan J Prichard	Biola	55	190	3.45
12	Kyle Boyd	Northern Colorado	54	179	3.31
13	Joe M Costello	St. Thomas	68	178	2.62
14	Austin Jenkin	Cal State San Marcos	61	177	2.90
15	Jack Dumsa	GVSU	70	176	2.51
16	John P Healy	SCAD	55	172	3.13
17	David Justvig	Missouri Baptist	56	172	3.07
18	George Pertessis	San Jose State	45	166	3.69
19	Luke Tardich	GVSU	55	163	2.96
20	Christian A Furbay	Dayton	60	162	2.70
21	Ryan Brouwer	New Haven	48	161	3.35
22	Josh Puckett	Indiana Tech	47	157	3.34
23	Jacob Bohince	Western Oregon	50	157	3.14
24	Michael Mann	Sam Houston State	37	156	4.22
25	Joshua S Smith	Providence	46	155	3.37
26	Louis R Richman	Montana State	56	154	2.75
27	Chad F Murphy	Fort Lewis	44	152	3.45
28	Will W McCormick	Dayton	46	152	3.30
29	Micah Willis	Fullerton	54	152	2.81
30	Spenser Brock	Western Oregon	57	152	2.67
31	Alexander Brown	Montana State	53	151	2.85
32	Josh Condas	Westminster	75	151	2.01

== Executive committee ==
- Ken Lovic (President)
- Zach Bosh
- Gary Podesta
- Mike DeWan
- Jason Stockton
- Tony Scazzero
- Mike Annala

== See also ==
- List of MCLA teams
- 2015 MCLA Tournament
- NCAA Men's Lacrosse Championship
- US Lacrosse
- US Lacrosse Intercollegiate Associates
