= Continental Lacrosse Conference =

- Association: Men's Collegiate Lacrosse Association
- Sport: College Lacrosse
- Founded: 2019
- President: Don Vince
- Divisions: 3
- No. of teams: 19
- Most recent champions: Division 1: Northeastern Division 2: Rhode Island Division 3: Worcester Polytechnic Institute (2025)
- Most titles: Division 1: Northeastern (3 Titles) Division 2: Rhode Island (6 Titles) Division 3: Worcester Polytechnic Institute (3 Titles)
- Website: https://mcla.us/conferences/clc

The Continental Lacrosse Conference (CLC) is a men's collegiate club lacrosse conference that competes within the Men's Collegiate Lacrosse Association (MCLA), the national organization for non-NCAA collegiate lacrosse programs across the United States and Canada. The CLC was founded in 2018 following the reorganization and merger of the former Central Collegiate Lacrosse Association (CCLA) and Pioneer Collegiate Lacrosse League (PCLL), aiming to streamline operations and better serve programs primarily located in the Northeastern United States.

The CLC is structured into three divisions — Division I, Division II, and Division III — providing competitive opportunities for a wide range of collegiate programs. The conference features a mix of established and emerging lacrosse teams and regularly qualifies its champions for the annual MCLA National Championships.

Notable programs in Division I include Boston College, Northeastern University, and the University of New Hampshire, all of which have been nationally ranked and have made deep runs in the MCLA postseason. In Division II, the University of Rhode Island and Bridgewater State University have consistently been among the top programs, earning multiple national tournament appearances. The CLC also launched Division III competition to support developing programs, such as Fitchburg State University and Framingham State University, allowing them to compete at a level appropriate to their stage of development.

== History ==
The Continental Lacrosse Conference (CLC) was established in 2018 through the merger of the Central Collegiate Lacrosse Association (CCLA) and the Pioneer Collegiate Lacrosse League (PCLL), aiming to streamline operations and better serve programs primarily located in the Northeastern United States.

In 2021, the University of Pittsburgh and Temple University departed the CLC to join the newly formed Atlantic Lacrosse Conference (ALC).

Conversely, Syracuse University joined the CLC's Division I ranks in 2025, bolstering the conference's profile. This addition enabled the CLC to secure automatic qualifying (AQ) bids for both its Division I and Division II champions to the MCLA National Championships.

== Teams ==
=== Division 1 ===
Institution	Location	Founded	Affiliation	Enrollment	Team Nickname	Primary conference
Boston College	Chestnut Hill, Massachusetts	1863	Private (Catholic)	15,046	Eagles	ACC (Division I)
University at Buffalo	Buffalo, New York	1846	Public	32,332	Bulls	MAC (Division I)
University of Connecticut	Storrs, Connecticut	1881	Public	26,876	Huskies	Big East (Division I)
University of New Hampshire	Durham, New Hampshire	1809	Public	13,991	Wildcats	AEC (Division I)
Northeastern University	Boston, Massachusetts	1898	Private (Nonsectarian)	28,167	Huskies	CAA (Division I)
University of Pittsburgh	Pittsburgh, Pennsylvania	1787	Public	35,528	Panthers	ACC (Division I)
Syracuse University	Syracuse, New York	1870	Private (Nonsectarian)	22,698	Orange	ACC (Division I)
Temple University	Philadelphia, Pennsylvania	1888	Public	30,005	Owls	AAC (Division I)

=== Division 2 ===
Institution	Location	Founded	Affiliation	Enrollment	Team Nickname	Primary conference
Bridgewater State University	Bridgewater, Massachusetts	1840	Public	9,942	Bears	MASCAC (Division III)
Central Connecticut State University	New Britain, Connecticut	1849	Public	9,653	Blue Devils	NEC (Division I)
Columbia University	New York, New York	1754	Private (Nonsectarian)	36,649	Lions	Ivy (Division I)
University of Maine	Orono, Maine	1865	Public	10,878	Black Bears	AEC (Division I)
University of Rhode Island	Kingston, Rhode Island	1892	Public	16,696	Rams	A-10 (Division I)
Southern Connecticut State University	New Haven, Connecticut	1893	Public	8,788	Owls	NE-10 (Division II)
Stonehill College	Easton, Massachusetts	1948	Private (Catholic)	2,479	Skyhawks	NEC (Division I)
UMass-Dartmouth	Dartmouth, Massachusetts	1895	Public	8,513	Corsairs	LEC (Division III)

=== Division 3 ===
Institution	Location	Founded	Affiliation	Enrollment	Team Nickname	Primary conference
Fitchburg State University	Fitchburg, Massachusetts	1894	Public	6,554	Falcons	MASCAC (Division III)
Framingham State University	Framingham, Massachusetts	1839	Public	4,495	Rams	MASCAC (Division III)
Worcester Polytechnic Institute	Worcester, Massachusetts	1865	Private (Nonsectarian)	7,230	Engineers	NEWMAC (Division III)
Worcester State University	Worcester, Massachusetts	1874	Public	6,434	Lancers	MASCAC (Division III)

=== Independent ===
Institution	Location	Founded	Affiliation	Enrollment	Team Nickname	Primary conference
University of New Haven	West Haven, Connecticut	1920	Private (Nonsectarian)	7,513	Chargers	NE-10 (Division II)

== Conference Championships ==
Division 1					Division 2					Division 3				
Year	Champion	Score	Runner-up	Location	Year	Champion	Score	Runner-up	Location	Year	Champion	Score	Runner-up	Location
2019	New Hampshire	14-7	Michigan State	Taunton, MA	2019	Rhode Island	15-9	Central Connecticut State	Bridgewater, MA	2019	No Division 3 Championship			
2020	No Championship				2020	No Championship				2020	No Championship			
2021	No Championship				2021	No Championship				2021	No Championship			
2022	Boston College	9-8	Northeastern	Fitchburg, MA	2022	Rhode Island	19-12	Bridgewater State	Fitchburg, MA	2022	No Division 3 Championship			
2023	Boston College	13-9	Northeastern	Fitchburg, MA	2023	Rhode Island	17-4	Maine	Fitchburg, MA	2023	Fitchburg State	10-5	Framingham State	Fitchburg, MA
2024	Northeastern	13-8	Boston College	Weymouth, MA	2024	Rhode Island	17-6	Bridgewater State	Weymouth, MA	2024	WPI	10-7	Framingham State	Weymouth, MA
2025	Northeastern	10-8	Boston College	Weymouth, MA	2025	Bridgewater State	10-16	Rhode Island	Weymouth, MA	2025	WPI	11-5	Framingham State	Weymouth, MA
2026	Northeastern	9-8	Boston College	Weymouth, MA	2026	Rhode Island	17-4	Bridgewater State	Weymouth, MA	2026	WPI	1-0	Worcester State	Weymouth, MA

* Note: Bold text denotes MCLA National Champion

* Note: Italic text denotes MCLA National Champion runner-up
