= SouthEastern Lacrosse Conference =

Men's athletic conference in the U.S.

South Eastern Lacrosse Conference
- Conference: MCLA
- Founded: 1988
- Commissioner: David Basile
- Sports fielded: College lacrosse
- No. of teams: 17
- Headquarters: Atlanta, Georgia
- Region: Southeast
- Most recent champions: Florida State (Division 1) & Florida Atlantic (Division 2)
- Most titles: Georgia Tech (7x D1 Titles) & Elon, Kennesaw State, Florida Atlantic (Tied at 3x D2 Titles)
- Website: https://www.selc.org/

The SouthEastern Lacrosse Conference (SELC) is a lacrosse-only athletic conference affiliated with the Men's Collegiate Lacrosse Association (MCLA). The SELC incorporates teams in Alabama, Florida, Georgia, South Carolina, Tennessee, and is divided into two divisions, Division I and Division II. With 17 members, it is one of the largest of the MCLA's nine conferences. In 2021 several teams in the mid Atlantic region split off to create the Atlantic Lacrosse Conference.

== About ==
The SouthEastern Lacrosse Conference (SELC) is a collegiate lacrosse club league based in the Southeastern United States. In 1988, the SELC was founded to provide for organized, regional college level lacrosse competition and to provide an outlet for high school players in the Southeast to play at the collegiate level. Since its inception, the SELC membership has expanded dramatically due to the explosive growth of high school and youth lacrosse in the Southeast.

The SELC has provided consistent collegiate competition among the member teams, produced viable team/player recognition awards and stages a championship event. Additionally, the is sees high school players from the typical lacrosse base of the eastern seaboard come south for educational opportunities.

== Teams ==
Currently, 9 different teams are in the SELC Division I. All of the SELC DI teams are members of NCAA Division I. Currently the SELC DI league includes member schools from the Southeastern Conference (SEC), the Atlantic Coast Conference (ACC), the Big 12 Conference (B12), and the Atlantic Sun Conference (ASUN). Eight institutions make up the SELC Division II League. The league comprises various collegiate athletics levels.

Institution	Location	Founded	Affiliation	Enrollment	Team nickname	Primary conference
Division I
North
University of Alabama	Tuscaloosa, Alabama	1831	Public	38,316	Crimson Tide	SEC (Division I)
University of Georgia	Athens, Georgia	1785	Public	40,118	Bulldogs	SEC (Division I)
Georgia Institute of Technology	Atlanta, Georgia	1885	Public	43,844	Yellow Jackets	ACC (Division I)
University of South Carolina	Columbia, South Carolina	1801	Public	35,471	Gamecocks	SEC (Division I)
South
Auburn University	Auburn, Alabama	1856	Public	31,526	Tigers	SEC (Division I)
University of Central Florida	Orlando, Florida	1963	Public	70,406	Knights	B12 (Division I)
University of Florida	Gainesville, Florida	1853	Public	55,781	Gators	SEC (Division I)
Florida State University	Tallahassee, Florida	1851	Public	45,130	Seminoles	ACC (Division I)
Jacksonville University	Jacksonville, Florida	1934	Private	4,247	Dolphins	ASUN (Division I)
Division II
North
University of North Florida	Jacksonville, Florida	1969	Public	16,594	Ospreys	ASUN (Division I)
Kennesaw State University	Kennesaw, Georgia	1963	Public	42,983	Owls	SoCon (Division I)
Georgia Southern University	Statesboro, Georgia	1906	Public	27,091	Eagles	Sun Belt (Division I)
South
Florida Atlantic University	Boca Raton, Florida	1961	Public	30,155	Owls	AAC (Division I)
Florida Gulf Coast University	Fort Myers, Florida	1991	Public	15,929	Eagles	ASUN (Division I)
University of Miami	Miami, Florida	1925	Private	19,096	Hurricanes	ACC (Division I)
University of South Florida	Tampa, Florida	1956	Public	44,322	Bulls	AAC (Division I)
University of Tampa	Tampa, Florida	1931	Private	11,047	Spartans	SSC (Division II)

== Championship history ==
Division I Champions
Year	Champion	Runner-up
1988	Vanderbilt	Auburn
1989	Vanderbilt	Auburn
1990	Clemson	Vanderbilt
1991	Georgia	
1992	Vanderbilt	Tennessee
1993	Tennessee	Vanderbilt
1994	Tennessee	Vanderbilt
1995	Vanderbilt	Emory
1996	South Carolina	Emory
1997	Georgia Tech	Auburn
1998	Georgia	Auburn
1999	Tennessee	Auburn
2000	Tennessee	Virginia Tech
2001	Auburn	Virginia Tech
2002	Auburn	Virginia Tech
2003	Florida	Virginia Tech
2004	Georgia Tech	Florida
2005	Virginia Tech	Florida State
2006	Florida State	Virginia Tech
2007	Georgia	Florida
2008	Georgia	Virginia Tech
2009	Florida State	Virginia Tech
2010	Florida	Virginia Tech
2011	Florida State	Clemson
2012	Virginia Tech	Florida State
2013	Georgia	Georgia Tech
2014	Virginia Tech	Liberty
2015	Virginia Tech	Georgia Tech
2016	Georgia Tech	Liberty
2017	Georgia Tech	Liberty
2018	Virginia Tech	South Carolina
2019	**South Carolina**	Georgia Tech
2020	No championship	
2021	No championship	
2022	**South Carolina**	Georgia Tech
2023	Georgia Tech	South Carolina
2024	Georgia Tech	Florida
2025	Georgia Tech	Florida
2026	Florida State	Georgia

Division I Championship records
Team	Championships	Winning year	Runner-up	Runner-up years
Georgia Tech	7	1997, 2004, 2016, 2017, 2023, 2024, 2025	4	2013, 2015, 2019, 2022
Georgia	5	1991, 1998, 2007, 2008, 2013	1	2026
Virginia Tech	5	2005, 2012, 2014, 2015, 2018	8	2000, 2001, 2002, 2003, 2006, 2008, 2009, 2010
Vanderbilt	4	1988, 1989, 1992, 1995	3	1990, 1993, 1994
Tennessee	4	1993, 1994, 1999, 2000	1	1992
Florida State	3	2006, 2009, 2011	2	2005, 2012
South Carolina	3	1996, **2019**, **2022**	1	2018, 2023
Auburn	2	2001, 2002	4	1988, 1989, 1998, 1999
Florida	2	2003, 2010	4	2004, 2007, 2024, 2025
Clemson	1	1990	1	2011
Florida State	1	2026		
Emory			2	1995, 1996
Liberty			3	2014, 2016, 2017

Note: Bold text indicates an MCLA National Championship winner.

Note: Italic text indicates an MCLA National Championship runner-up.

Division II Champions
Year	Champion	Runner-up
2003	Georgia	South Florida
2004	East Carolina	Florida
2005	Davidson College	Central Florida
2006	Eckerd College	Elon
2007	Emory	UNC Charlotte
2008	Elon	Emory
2009	Emory	Elon
2010	Elon	Kennesaw State
2011	Savannah College of Art and Design	Elon
2012	Elon	Kennesaw State
2013	Liberty	Savannah College of Art and Design
2014	Reinhardt	Kennesaw State
2015	Florida Gulf Coast	Palm Beach Atlantic
2016	Reinhardt	Kennesaw State
2017	Florida Gulf Coast	Kennesaw State
2018	Kennesaw State	Florida Gulf Coast
2019	North Florida	Kennesaw State
2020	No Championship	
2021	No Championship	
2022	Kennesaw State	Florida Gulf Coast
2023	Kennesaw State	Florida Gulf Coast
2024	Florida Atlantic	Kennesaw State
2025	Florida Atlantic	Kennesaw State
2026	Florida Atlantic	Tampa

Division II Championship records
Team	Championships	Winning year	Runner-up	Runner-up years
Elon	3	2008, 2010, 2012	3	2006, 2009, 2011
Kennesaw State	3	2018, 2022, 2023	8	2010, 2012, 2014, 2016, 2017, 2019, 2024, 2025
Emory	2	2007, 2009	1	2008
Reinhardt	2	2014, 2016		
Florida Gulf Coast	2	2015, 2017	3	2018, 2022, 2023
Florida Atlantic	3	2024, 2025, 2026		
Georgia	1	2003		
East Carolina	1	2004		
Davidson College	1	2005		
Eckerd College	1	2006		
Savannah College of Art and Design	1	2011	1	2013
Liberty	1	2013		
North Florida	1	2019		
South Florida			1	2003
Florida			1	2004
Central Florida			1	2005
UNC Charlotte			1	2007
Palm Beach Atlantic			1	2015
Tampa			1	2026
