= Navy Midshipmen =

Sports teams of the United States Naval Academy

- University: United States Naval Academy
- Nickname: Midshipmen
- NCAA: Division I (FBS)
- Conference: Patriot League (primary); American (football); Collegiate Sprint Football League; Eastern Association of Rowing Colleges; Eastern Association of Women's Rowing Colleges; Eastern Intercollegiate Gymnastics League; Eastern Intercollegiate Wrestling Association; CWPA (men's water polo); MAWPC (water polo); CSA (men’s squash); GARC (rifle); Rugby East (men's rugby)
- Athletic director: Michael Kelly
- Location: Annapolis, Maryland
- Football stadium: Navy–Marine Corps Memorial Stadium
- Basketball arena: Alumni Hall
- Baseball stadium: Terwilliger Brothers Field at Max Bishop Stadium
- Other venues: Glenn Warner Soccer Facility, Ingram Field, McMullen Hockey Arena, Wesley Brown Field House, Halsey Field House
- Colors: Navy blue and gold
- Mascot: Bill the Goat
- Fight song: Anchors Aweigh
- Website: navysports.com
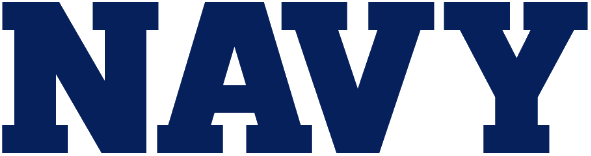

The Navy Midshipmen are the athletic teams that represent the United States Naval Academy. The academy sponsors 36 varsity sports teams and 12 club sport teams. Both men's and women's teams are called Navy Midshipmen or Mids. They participate in the NCAA's Division I, as a non-football member of the Patriot League, a football-only member of the American Athletic Conference in the Football Bowl Subdivision (FBS), and a member of the Collegiate Sprint Football League (men), Eastern Association of Rowing Colleges (men), Eastern Association of Women's Rowing Colleges, Eastern Intercollegiate Gymnastics League (men), Mid-Atlantic Squash Conference (men) and Eastern Intercollegiate Wrestling Association. Navy is also one of approximately 300 members of the Eastern College Athletic Conference (ECAC).

The most important sporting event at the academy is the annual Army–Navy Game. The 2014 season marked Navy's 13th consecutive victory over Army. The three major service academies (Navy, Air Force, and Army) compete for the Commander-in-Chief's Trophy, which is awarded to the academy that defeats the others in football that year (or retained by the previous winner in the event of a three-way tie).

Participation in athletics is, in general, mandatory at the Naval Academy and most Midshipmen not on an intercollegiate team must participate actively in intramural or club sports. There are exceptions for non-athletic Brigade Support Activities such as YP Squadron (a professional surface warfare training activity providing midshipmen the opportunity to earn the Craftmaster Badge) or the Drum and Bugle Corps.

Varsity-letter winners wear a specially-issued blue cardigan with a large gold "N" patch affixed. If they belong to a team that beats Army in any sport designated "Star" competition, they are also awarded a gold star ("N-Star") to affix near the "N" for each such victory.

== Teams ==
The United States Naval Academy sponsors varsity teams in seventeen men's, ten women's, and three coed NCAA-sanctioned sports:

Men's sports	Women's sports
Baseball	Basketball
Basketball	Cross country
Cross country	Golf
Football^{9}	Lacrosse
Golf	Rowing
Gymnastics^{1}	Soccer
Lacrosse	Swimming & diving
Rowing^{5}	Tennis
Soccer	Track & field^{†}
Squash^{6}	Volleyball
Swimming & diving	Triathlon
Tennis	
Track & field^{*}	
Water polo^{2}	
Wrestling^{3}	
Co-ed sports
Sailing^{7}
Rifle^{8}
^{*} – includes both indoor and outdoor

- ^{1} – The gymnastics team competes in the Eastern Intercollegiate Gymnastics League.
- ^{2} – The water polo team competes in the Collegiate Water Polo Association.
- ^{3} – The wrestling team competes in the Eastern Intercollegiate Wrestling Association.
- ^{4} – Sprint football is sanctioned by the Collegiate Sprint Football League, not by the NCAA.
- ^{5} – Men's heavyweight rowing is sanctioned by the Intercollegiate Rowing Association; men's lightweight rowing is sanctioned by the Eastern Association of Rowing Colleges; neither is sanctioned by the NCAA.
- ^{6} – Squash is sanctioned by the College Squash Association, not by the NCAA.
- ^{7} – Intercollegiate sailing is sanctioned by the Intercollegiate Sailing Association; offshore sailing is sanctioned by various organizations; neither is sanctioned by the NCAA.
- ^{8} – Rifle is technically a men's sport, but men's, women's, and coed teams all compete against each other; Navy has a coed team that competes in the Great America Rifle Conference.
- ^{9} – The football team is a single-sport member of the American Athletic Conference.
- USNA Men's Rugby – The rugby team competes in the Rugby East Conference.

== Men's varsity sports ==
=== Baseball ===
See footnote. See also: Category:Navy Midshipmen baseball, NCAA Division I Baseball Championship, and United States Navy Baseball

=== Basketball ===
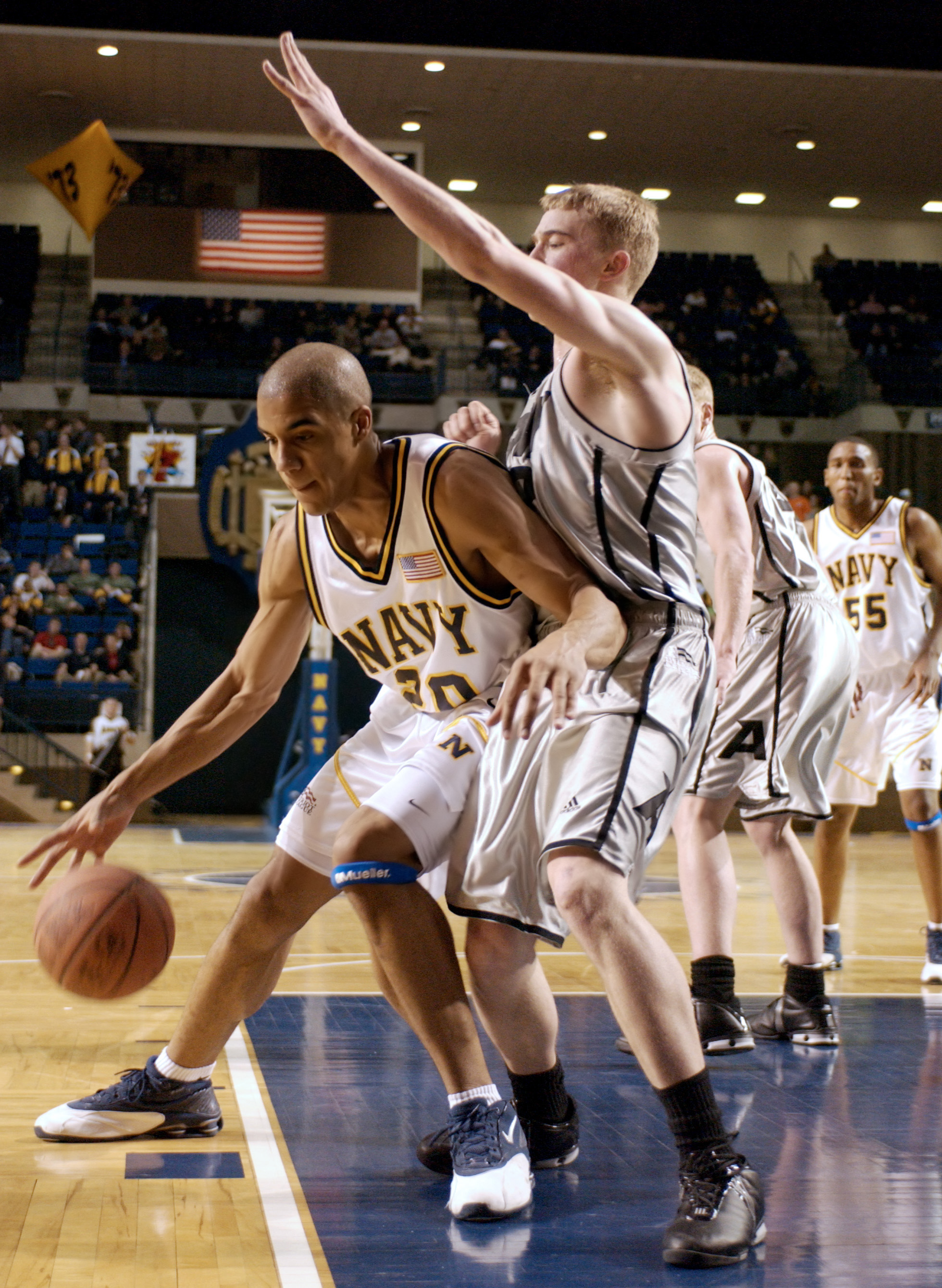
Navy Midshipman George O’Garro attempts to score during the Army–Navy basketball game in Alumni Hall at the U.S. Naval Academy on January 31, 2004

The men's basketball team has appeared in the NCAA tournament 11 times and made regional finals (the "Elite Eight") in 1954 and 1986.

- 1986: Elite Eight, NCAA Tournament (7th seed)

The team has won its conference tournament six times: once in the Eastern College Athletic Conference (ECAC) (1985), twice in the Colonial Athletic Association (CAA) (1986 and 1987), and three times in its current conference, the Patriot League (1994, 1997, and 1998).

Navy was retroactively recognized as the pre-NCAA Tournament national champion for the 1912–13 and 1918–19 seasons by the Premo-Porretta Power Poll and for the 1912–13 season by the Helms Athletic Foundation.

=== Crew ===
See also: Eastern Association of Rowing Colleges (EARC), Intercollegiate sports team champions § Rowing, and Walsh Cup (rowing)

The heavyweight crew won Olympic gold medals in men's eights in 1920 and 1952, and from 1907 to 1995 at Intercollegiate Rowing Association regatta the team earned 30 championships, was runner-up 29 times, and had 31 third-place finishes.

The lightweight crew won the 2004 and 2021 National Championship and has finished second three times, the most recent being 2010. The lightweights are accredited with two Jope Cup Championships as well, finishing the Eastern Sprints with the highest number of points in 2006 and 2007.

=== Fencing ===
The men's fencing team won three NCAA Division I championships and was runner-up four times.

NCAA Fencing Team Championship - Division I

- 1948: National Runner-up
- 1950: National Champion
- 1953: National Runner-up

- 1959: National Champion
- 1960: National Runner-up

- 1962: National Champion
- 1963: National Runner-up

The varsity program was disestablished in 1993, but USNA does have club fencing (see Men's and Women's Club Sports below).

=== Football ===
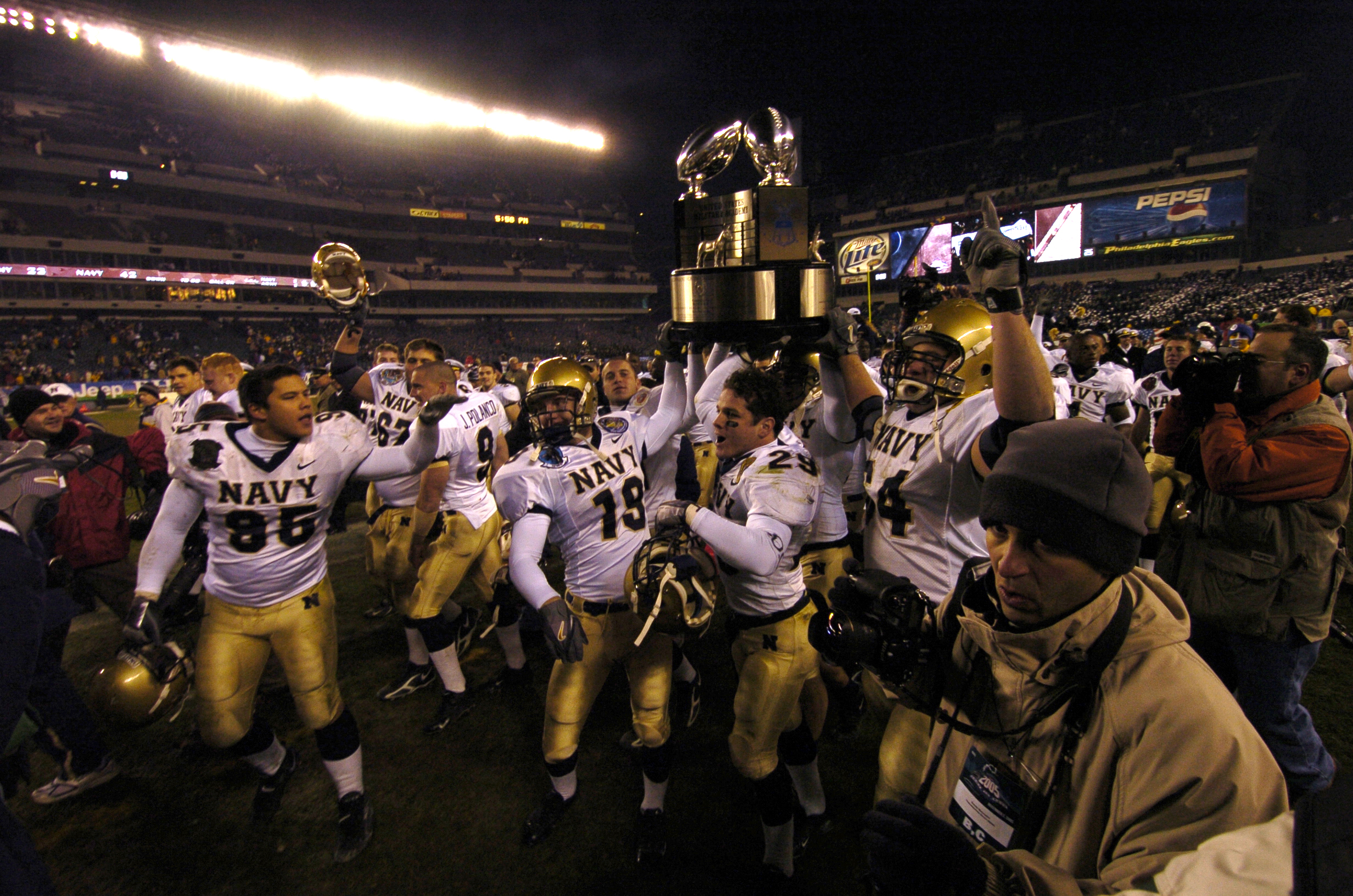
Navy celebrates winning the Commander-in-Chief's Trophy after winning the 2005 Army–Navy Game on December 3, 2005

The Naval Academy's football program is one of the nation's oldest, with its history dating back to 1879. There were two separate efforts to establish a Naval Academy football team in 1879. The first was guided by first-classman J.H. Robinson, who developed it as a training regiment to help keep the school's baseball team in shape. The team played the sport under rules that made it much closer to soccer, where the players were permitted only to kick the ball in order to advance it. The second effort, headed by first-classman William John Maxwell was more successful in its efforts. Maxwell met with two of his friends, Tunstall Smith and Henry Woods, who played for the Baltimore Athletic Club and officially challenged their team to a game with the Naval Academy. A team was formed from academy first-classmen, which Maxwell led as a manager, trainer, and captain. The team would wake up and practice before reveille and following drill and meals. The squad received encouragement from some of the faculty, who allowed them to eat a late dinner and skip final drill for additional practicing. This was against the direct orders of the school superintendent, who had banned football and similar activities.

- 1926: National Champion

=== Lacrosse ===
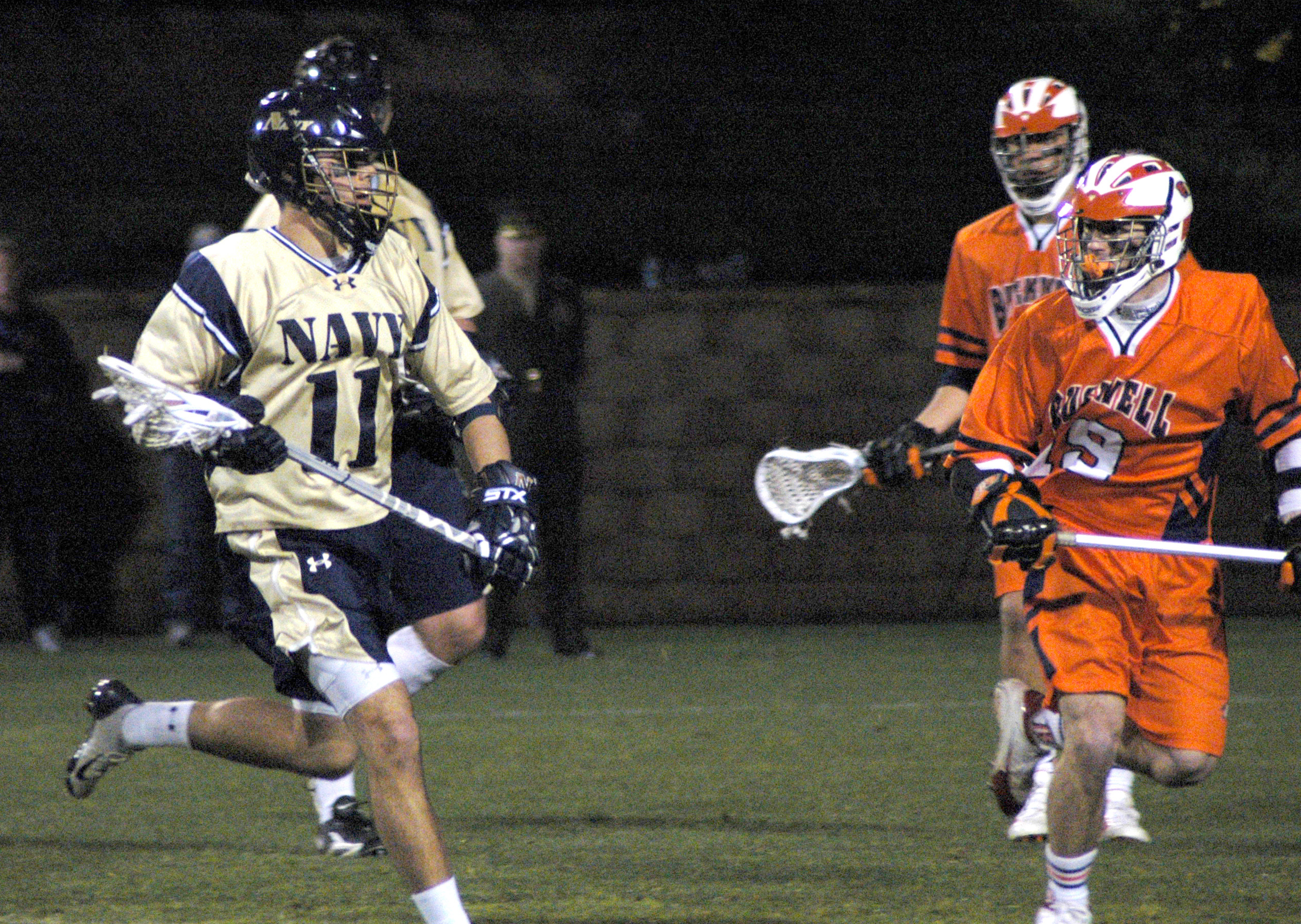
Navy playing Bucknell in the 2006 First 4

NCAA Men's Lacrosse Championship

- 1975: National Runner-up
- 2004: National Runner-up

=== Rugby ===
See also: College rugby and Intercollegiate sports team champions § Rugby

Division 1-A Rugby - Division I

- 1994: Runner-up
- 2023: National Champion
- 2024: Runner-up
- 2026: Runner-up

Founded in 1963 and a varsity sport since the 2022–23 school year, Navy plays its regular season in the Rugby East conference and its post-season in the CRAA Championship. With 88 registered players as of 2009, Navy was ranked as the largest college rugby program in the United States.

Navy's rugby program is one of the most successful college rugby programs in the country. Navy's best season was 2023, when Navy beat Cal 28-22 for the D1A Elite National Championship. Since the inception of the national collegiate championship in 1980, Navy men's rugby reached the national semifinals twice in the 1980s and reached the semifinals 7 times during the 12-year span from 1996-2007. More recently, in the 2010-11 season Navy reached the national quarterfinals and finished the season ranked 9th in the country. Navy finished the 2012-13 season first in the Atlantic Coast Rugby League, and ranked 11th in the country.

Navy has been successful in rugby sevens. Navy plays each year in the Collegiate Rugby Championship (CRC), reaching the quarterfinals in 2010 and again in 2012. Navy also played in the 2012 USA Rugby Sevens Collegiate National Championships, advancing to the quarterfinals and finishing with a 4-2 record, including a win over rival Air Force. Navy completed their first undefeated season and won their first national championship by defeating California 28–22 in the 2023 Division 1-A Rugby Championship.

=== Soccer ===
NCAA Men's Soccer Championship - Division I

- 1963: National Runner-up
- 1964: National Champion

Intercollegiate Soccer Football Association

- 1932: National Champion (with University of Pennsylvania)

=== Sprint football ===
See footnote See also: Collegiate Sprint Football League (CSFL)

- 2014 CSFL National Champion
- 2018 CSFL National Champion
- 2021 CSFL National Champion
- 2022 CSFL National Champion

=== Squash ===
See footnote. See also: Intercollegiate sports team champions § Squash

The men's squash team was the national nine-man team champion in 1957, 1959, and 1967.

=== Swimming and diving ===
See footnotes. See also: List of college swimming and diving teams

2010 – seventh straight Patriot League title and second consecutive Eastern College Athletic Conference (ECAC) championship. Will Norton was named ECAC Co-Swimmer of the Year. Head coach Bill Roberts was named ECAC Coach of the Year.

2011 – Navy Men moved into the top 25 in NCAA Division I polling. The 2010-11 team handed Princeton its first ever loss in Denunzio Pool at Princeton, 167-133. The team also won its eighth straight Patriot League title and third straight ECAC title.

=== Track and field ===
See footnote. See also: NCAA Men's Indoor Track and Field Championship

NCAA Men's Outdoor Track and Field Championship

- 1945: National Champion

=== Wrestling ===
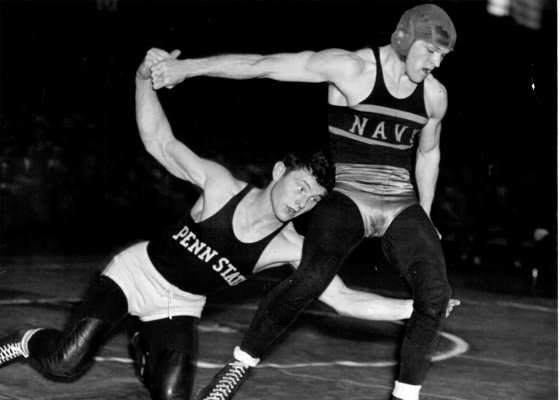
Navy and Penn State wrestlers in 1949

See footnote. See also: Eastern Intercollegiate Wrestling Association (EIWA) and NCAA Wrestling Team Championship

The Navy Midshipmen wrestling team is coached by Cary Kolat. The wrestling team at the United States Naval Academy have competed beginning since 1920 and have been competing for the NCAA Championships starting in the 1931 season. The team has placed as high as 5th at the NCAA Championships back in 1942 and 1968, and most recently 18th both in 2007 & 2008. With 44 wrestlers placing 61 times as All-Americans at the NCAA Division I Championships and 6 overall four-time All-Americans throughout its time. The Navy Midshipman compete on campus at the Wesley A. Brown Field House for home dual meets and tournaments competing in the Eastern Intercollegiate Wrestling Association, as the Patriot League does not sponsor wrestling.

=== Other sports ===
See footnote. See also: NCAA Men's Cross Country Championship

See footnotes. See also: Eastern Intercollegiate Gymnastics League (EIGL) and NCAA Men's Gymnastics championship

See footnote. See also: NCAA Division I Men's Golf Championships

See footnotes See also: NCAA Men's Tennis Championship

See footnote. See also: NCAA Men's Water Polo Championship

== Women's varsity sports ==
=== Basketball ===
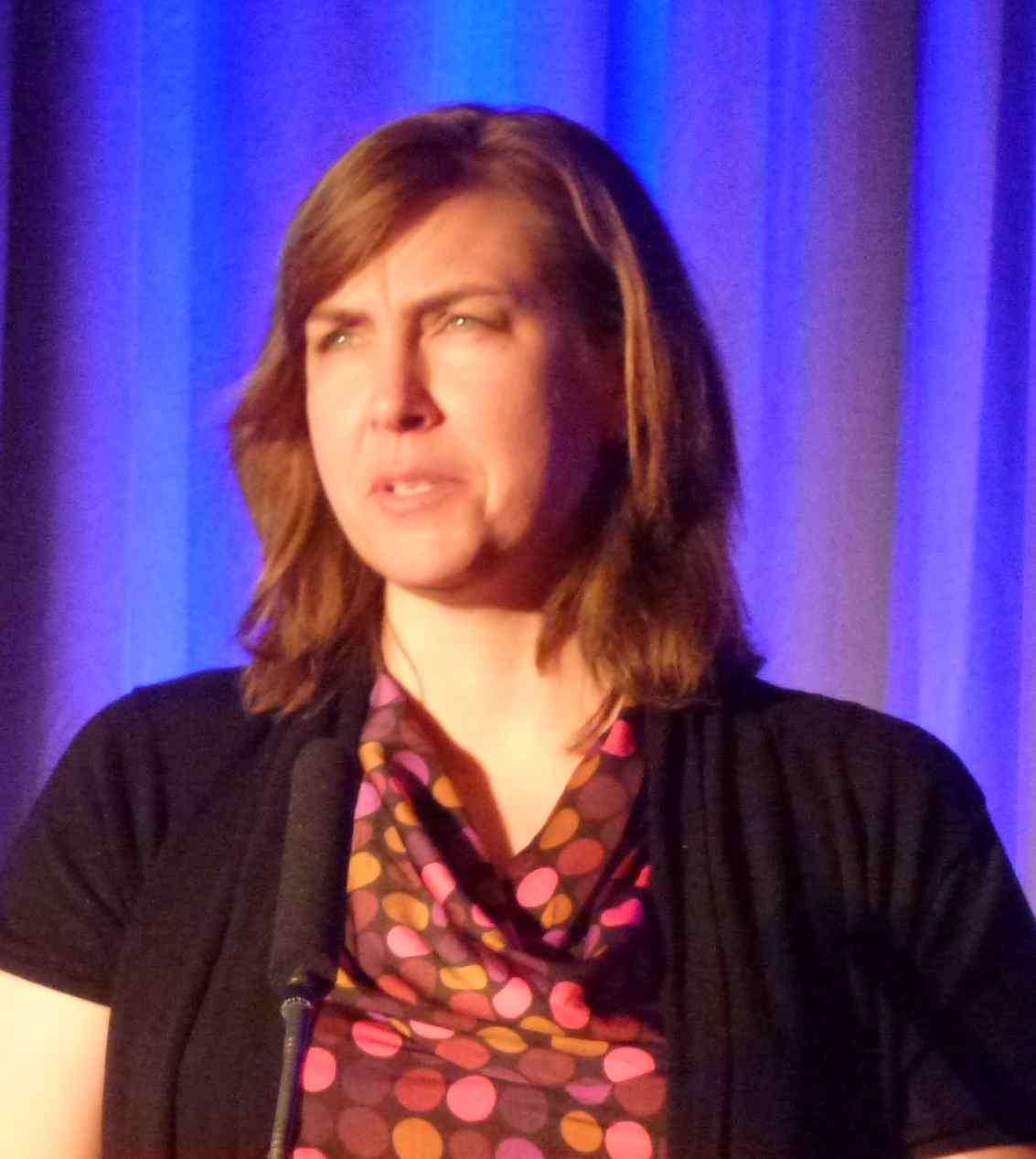
Stefanie Pemper, head coach of the Navy women's basketball team from 2008 to 2020, taken at the 2013 WBCA Convention in New Orleans.

See footnote. See also: NCAA Women's Division I Basketball Championship

The head coach of the Navy team is Tim Taylor. His predecessor Stefanie Pemper is the winningest coach in program history with a 214–164 record from 2008 to 2020.

=== Crew ===
See footnotes. See also: Eastern Association of Women's Rowing Colleges (EAWRC) and Intercollegiate sports team champions § Rowing

=== Cross country ===
See footnote. See also: NCAA Women's Cross Country Championship

=== Lacrosse ===
See footnote. See also: College lacrosse and WDIA

The women's lacrosse team was U.S. Lacrosse WDIA national runner-up in 2001 and 2007.

US Lacrosse Women's Division Intercollegiate Associates (WDIA) Championship

- 2001: National runner-up
- 2007: National runner-up

=== Rugby ===
Women's rugby was elevated from club to varsity status alongside men's rugby for the 2022–23 school year.

=== Soccer ===
See footnote. See also: NCAA Women's Soccer Championship

=== Swimming and diving ===
See footnote. See also: List of college swimming and diving teams

=== Tennis ===
See footnotes See also: NCAA Women's Tennis Championship

=== Track and field ===
See footnote See also: NCAA Women's Indoor Track and Field Championship

=== Triathlon ===
Women's triathlon, which has been sponsored at club level since 1992, is the Academy's newest varsity sport, having been elevated to varsity status for the 2023–24 school year.

=== Volleyball ===
See footnote See also: NCAA Women's Volleyball Championship

== Co-ed varsity sports ==
=== Alpine skiing (defunct) ===
Note: No longer listed as a sport at USNA.

The alpine ski team competes in the United States Collegiate Ski and Snowboard Association, and has made regular appearances in this decade at the USCSA National Championships.

=== Pistol ===
The Naval Academy won 13 NRA National Collegiate Open Pistol Championship, and 6 women's overall titles.

=== Rifle ===
See footnote

In intercollegiate shooting, the Naval Academy has won nine National Rifle Association of America rifle team trophies, seven air pistol team championships, and five standard pistol team titles.

NCAA Rifle Championship

- 1990: National runner-up
- 1999: National runner-up

=== Sailing (intercollegiate) ===
See footnotes. See also: Middle Atlantic Intercollegiate Sailing Association (MAISA), Inter-Collegiate Sailing Association (ICSA), ICSA National Championships, and Intercollegiate sports team champions#Sailing

The ICSA College Sailing Hall of Fame is located in the Robert Crown Sailing Center. Also on display in the Hall are the Naval Academy's sailing trophies and awards.

=== Sailing (offshore) ===
See footnote

== Men's club sports ==
See footnote
See also: NCAA Men's Volleyball Championship

=== Boxing ===
See also: National Collegiate Boxing Association#Midwest Collegiate Boxing Association

Pre-NCAA Boxing Championship

- 1925 – National Team Champion (unofficial)
- 1926 – National Team Champion (unofficial)
- 1928 – National Team Champion (unofficial)
- 1931 – National Team Champion (unofficial)

National Collegiate Boxing Association

- 1987 – National Team Champions
- 1996 – National Team Champions
- 1997 – National Team Champions
- 1998 – National Team Champions
- 2005 – National Team Champions

=== Fencing ===
After the varsity program was terminated in 1993, Navy Fencing returned as an Extracurricular Activity in 2002 and became a club sport in 2012. Midshipmen currently compete against other collegiate club level teams in the Baltimore-Washington Collegiate Fencing Conference (BWCFC) and the U.S. Association of Collegiate Fencing Clubs (USACFC), and against varsity teams as a member of the Mid-Atlantic Collegiate Fencing Association. At the USACFC National Championships, Joel Katz won the gold medal in individual men's epee in 2006, 2007, and 2008, the men's saber team of James Henderson, Sebastian Keefer, Christopher Meacham, and Andrew Weiss won the national championship in 2019, and the combined men's and women's team placed second at the 2019 USACFC National Championships.

=== Ice hockey ===
Navy Hockey plays at the McMullen Hockey Arena. Navy Hockey consists of three teams: an ACHA Division I team that plays in the Eastern Collegiate Hockey Association (ECHA), a Division II team in the ACCHL, and a women's Division II team that plays in College Hockey East. Navy Hockey is supported through donations to the Friends of Navy Hockey in conjunction with the United States Naval Academy Foundation.

Navy Hockey began as an informal student group in the early 1960s and was officially formed in 1971. Vice Admiral Walter "Ted" Carter, known as Slapshot, played on the team for four years from 1977-1981. He was a major supporter of hockey in Annapolis during his tenure as the USNA Superintendent from 2014 to 2019. Many midshipman from the mid 1970s- 2006 have fond memories of watching hockey games in Dahlgren Hall, a historic building on the Naval Academy Campus. Upon completion of the Brigade Sports Complex in 2007, the hockey team moved into the McMullen Hockey Arena which has seating capacity to hold 695 people. The McMullen Arena was funded by and named after USNA alum John McMullen, who at the time owned the NHL's New Jersey Devils. Throughout the season the arena hosts dozens of hockey games ending the season with the Crab Pot Tournament, a fixture since 1978.

Although not currently a member of NCAA Division I ice hockey, Navy co-hosted the 2009 NCAA Division I Men's Ice Hockey Tournament with The Greater Washington Sports Alliance at the Verizon Center located in nearby Washington, D.C. Navy is the lone DoD military academy that does not field a Division I men's hockey team, although rumors have long abounded that the program is a candidate to be elevated to full varsity status.

=== Rugby ===
See also: College rugby and Intercollegiate sports team champions § Rugby

Founded in 1963, Navy plays its regular season in the Rugby East League and its post-season in the CRAA Championship. With 88 registered players as of 2009, Navy was ranked as the largest college rugby program in the United States.

Navy's rugby program is one of the most successful college rugby programs in the country. Navy's best season was 2023, when Navy beat Cal 28-22 for the D1A Elite National Championship. Since the inception of the national collegiate championship in 1980, Navy men's rugby reached the national semifinals twice in the 1980s and reached the semifinals 7 times during the 12-year span from 1996-2007. More recently, in the 2010-11 season Navy reached the national quarterfinals and finished the season ranked 9th in the country. Navy finished the 2012-13 season first in the Atlantic Coast Rugby League, and ranked 11th in the country.

Navy has been successful in rugby sevens. Navy plays each year in the Collegiate Rugby Championship (CRC), reaching the quarterfinals in 2010 and again in 2012. Navy also played in the 2012 USA Rugby Sevens Collegiate National Championships, advancing to the quarterfinals and finishing with a 4-2 record, including a win over rival Air Force.

== Women's club sports ==
See footnote

=== Boxing ===
The women's boxing team began competing as part of the National Collegiate Boxing Association in 2015. In 2019, the women's team won the NCBA championship for the first time.

=== Fencing ===
Navy Women's Fencing competes against other collegiate club level teams in the Baltimore-Washington Collegiate Fencing Conference (BWCFC) and the U.S. Association of Collegiate Fencing Clubs (USACFC), and against varsity teams as a member of the National Intercollegiate Women's Fencing Association (NIWFA). At the USACFC National Championships, Rae Katz won the gold medal in women's individual epee in 2004, the combined women's team won the national championship in 2014, and the women's saber team won the national championship in 2015 and 2016 (Naomi Ngalle, Sara Shea, Maryam Al-Hassan (2015), and Naadia Puri (2016)). At the NIWFA Championships in 2016, Naomi Ngalle won the gold medal in individual women's saber in 2016.

=== Ice hockey ===
Navy Women's Ice Hockey officially became a club team (from Extra Curricular Activity team) as of Fall 2015.

=== Rugby ===
See footnote. See also: College rugby §§ Intercollegiate sports team champions and Rugby

Became a varsity sport starting in 2022–23.

=== Softball ===
See footnote. See also: Intercollegiate sports team champions § Softball (Fastpitch), Women

== Co-ed club sports ==
See footnote
See footnote. See also: Intercollegiate sports team champions#Cycling
See footnote. See also: Intercollegiate sports team champions#Karate
See footnote.
See footnote. See also: Intercollegiate sports team champions#Pistol
See footnote. See also: Intercollegiate sports team champions#Powerlifting
See footnote. See also: Intercollegiate sports team champions#Triathlon

== Intramural sports ==
See footnote

- Basketball

- Fieldball

- Flag Football

- Racquetball

- Slow-pitch softball

There is an unofficial (but previous National Champion) croquet team. Legend has it that in the early 1980s, a Mid and a Johnnie (slang for a student enrolled at St. John's College, Annapolis), were in a bar and the Mid challenged the Johnnie by stating that Midshipmen could beat St. John's at any sport. The St. John's student selected croquet. Since then, every April on the St. John’s lawn, thousands attend the annual croquet match between St. John's and the 28th Company of the Brigade of Midshipmen (originally the 34th Company before the Brigade was reduced to 30 companies). As of 2017, the Midshipmen had a record of 7 wins and 28 losses to the St John's team.

== Championships ==
=== NCAA team championships ===
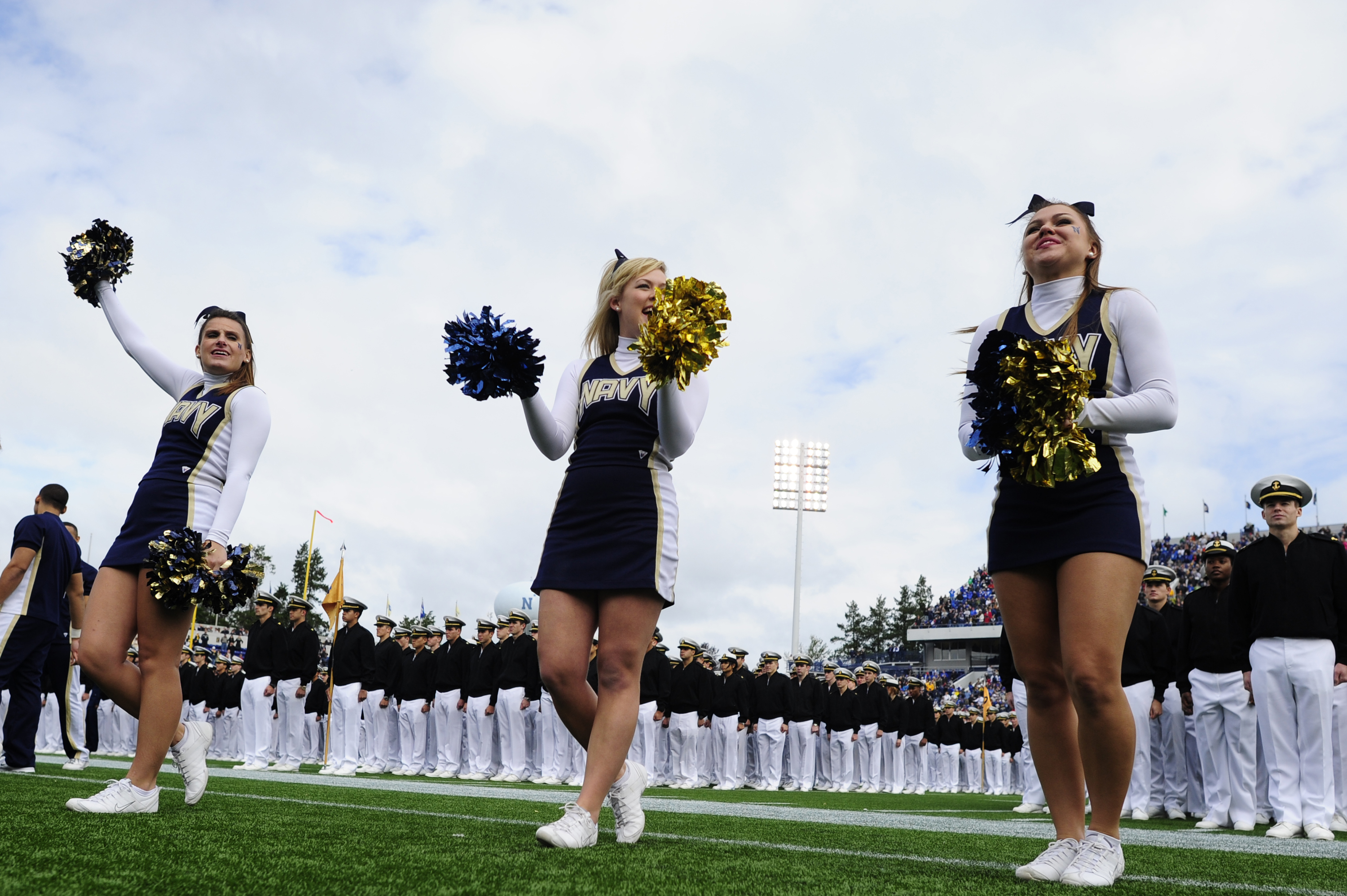

Navy has won 5 NCAA team national championships.

- Men's (5)
  - Fencing (3): 1950, 1959, 1962
  - Outdoor Track & Field (1): 1945
  - Soccer (1): 1964

See also:

- American Athletic Conference NCAA team championships
- List of NCAA schools with the most NCAA Division I team championships

=== Other national team championships ===
The following 80 national team titles were not bestowed by the NCAA (2 were unofficial NCAA championships):

- Men's
  - Swimming and Diving (2): 1925, 1926 (unofficial NCAA team titles)
  - Boxing (4): 1925, 1926, 1928, 1931
  - Fencing (25): foil: 1901, 1905, 1907, 1910, 1915–1917, 1920–1922, 1925, 1929, 1939; epee: 1924, 1933, 1938, 1939, 1943; saber: 1922, 1932, 1943; 3-weapon: 1924, 1925, 1939, 1943
  - Gymnastics (1): 1925°
  - Lacrosse (17): 1928, 1929, 1938, 1943, 1945, 1946, 1949, 1954, 1960–1967, 1970
  - Rifle (12): 1924–1926, 1930, 1931, 1934, 1935, 1937, 1939, 1948, 1967, 1969
  - Outdoor rifle (1): 1921
  - Rowing (16): 1921, 1922, 1925, 1931, 1938, 1947, 1952, 1960, 1963, 1965, 1982–1984, 1990, 1993, 1995, 2021
  - Rugby (1): 2023
  - Soccer (1): 1932

° In 1925 Navy gymnasts defeated Chicago, 33 - 12, in a dual meet between winners of the Intercollegiate and Western Conference championship meets. "[I]n the twenty year period from 1910 to (the end of 1929) ... Navy has participated in 91 tournaments and dual meets and won 87 of them, including all seven of the intercollegiate championship events entered." (Those seven events were conference, not national, championships.) Navy was so strong that the Intercollegiate Association asked Navy not to participate in the 1926 championship meet. Navy was not a participant in the 1926, 1927 and 1928 championship meets.

see also:

- List of NCAA schools with the most Division I national championships

== Athletic Hall of Fame ==
See footnote. See also: USNA § Campus, Anders Hall of Honor (soccer), and USNA sailing trophies and awards

The Athletic Hall of Fame is housed in Lejeune Hall. Among the exhibits are two Heisman Trophies — won by Joe Bellino in 1960 and Roger Staubach in 1963 — and the Eastman Award won by basketball-star David Robinson in 1987.

== Awards ==
- Lt. Donald McLaughlin Jr. Award (national men's lacrosse award; named for a member of the Class of 1963)
- NCAA Award of Valor (2008) – Doug Zembiec (Class of 1995), a USMC major who demonstrated heroism in several incidents before his death in Iraq.
- NCAA Theodore Roosevelt Award:
  - 1976 – Thomas J. Hamilton (football, basketball, baseball)
  - 1984 – William P. Lawrence (basketball, football, tennis)
  - 2000 – Roger Staubach (football)
  - 2024 - Chris Cordner (Sailing)

== Alumni ==
See: USNA alumni § Athletes, USNA alumni § Olympics competitors, and USNA alumni § Other sports figures

== Facilities ==
See footnote

- Alumni Hall (built 1991) (basketball)
- Brigade Sports Complex (built 2007)
- Dahlgren Hall (built 1903) (fencing)
- Dyer Tennis Clubhouse (built 2000)
- Fisher Rowing Center – see Hubbard Hall (below)
- Fluegel-Moore Tennis Stadium – see Tose Family Tennis Center (below)
- Glenn Warner Soccer Facility (built 2002)
- Halsey Field House (built 1957) (indoor track and field)
- Hooper Brigade Sports Complex – see Brigade Sports Complex (above)
- Hubbard Hall (built 1930; renovated 1993) (crew) – see USNA § Halls and principal buildings
- Jack Stephens Field at Navy–Marine Corps Memorial Stadium (football, lacrosse)
- Lejeune Hall (built 1982) (swimming, water polo, wrestling) – see USNA § Halls and principal buildings
- MacDonough Hall (built 1903; renovated 1982) (boxing, gymnastics) – see USNA § Halls and principal buildings
- Max Bishop Stadium – see Terwilliger Brothers Field at Max Bishop Stadium (below)
- McMullen Hockey Arena (ice hockey) – see Brigade Sports Complex (above)
- Naval Academy Golf Club
- Navy–Marine Corps Memorial Stadium – see Jack Stephens Field (above)
- Ricketts Hall (built 1966; renovated 2004) – see USNA § Halls and principal buildings
- Rip Miller Field (sprint football)
- Robert Crown Sailing Center (sailing)
- Scott Natatorium (built 1923; renovated 1982)
- Terwilliger Brothers Field at Max Bishop Stadium (renovated 2005) (baseball)
- Tose Family Tennis Center – see Brigade Sports Complex (above)
- Wesley Brown Field House (built 2008) (cross country, track and field, sprint football, women’s lacrosse, sixteen club sports)

== Apparel ==
Since the 2014–15 season, the Navy Midshipmen wear Under Armour uniforms. The team previously used Nike apparel.

== See also ==
- Military World Games
- List of NCAA schools with the most Division I national championships
- Sports in Maryland § United States Naval Academy
- List of college athletic programs in Maryland § Division I
