= Great Rivers Lacrosse Conference =

- Conference: MCLA
- Founded: 2002
- Folded: 2017
- Commissioner: Matt Gardiner
- Sports fielded: College lacrosse
- No. of teams: 16
- Headquarters: St. Louis, Missouri
- Region: Midwest and Great Lakes
- Website: http://mcla.us/GRLC/

The Great Rivers Lacrosse Conference (GRLC) was a conference in the Men's Collegiate Lacrosse Association (MCLA). The GRLC incorporated teams in Illinois, Indiana, Kansas, Missouri, Nebraska, and Ohio and was divided into two divisions, Division I and Division II.

== History ==
The conference was formed in 2002 after teams in the southwestern region of the Central Collegiate Lacrosse Association separated to form the Great Rivers Lacrosse Conference.

In 2017, it was announced that the GRLC would be dissolved as an MCLA Conference. Illinois, Illinois State, Indiana, Kansas, Missouri, Nebraska and Purdue were all moved to the Upper Midwest Lacrosse Conference (UMLC), while Creighton, Kansas State, Missouri State, Missouri S&T, Saint Louis, Southern Illinois and Washington University in St. Louis were moved to the Lone Star Alliance (LSA).

== Teams ==
GRLC Teams were split into two Divisions with the top programs and larger schools in Division I and smaller schools and programs in Division II. There were 9 members in Division I and 7 members in Division II.

Institution	Location	Founded	Affiliation	Enrollment	Team Nickname	New Conference
Division I
University of Illinois	Champaign, Illinois	1867	Public	42,326	Fighting Illini	UMCLL Division I
Illinois State University	Normal, Illinois	1857	Public	20,104	Redbirds	UMCLL Division I
Indiana University	Bloomington, Indiana	1820	Public	38,599	Hoosiers	UMCLL Division I
University of Kansas	Lawrence, Kansas	1865	Public	30,102	Jayhawks	UMCLL Division I
Kansas State University	Manhattan, Kansas	1863	Public	23,520	Wildcats	LSA Division II
Miami University	Oxford, Ohio	1809	Public	20,126	RedHawks	UMCLL Division I
University of Missouri	Columbia, Missouri	1839	Public	32,000	Tigers	UMCLL Division I
University of Nebraska	Lincoln, Nebraska	1869	Public	23,000	Cornhuskers	UMCLL Division I
Purdue University	West Lafayette, Indiana	1869	Public	39,697	Boilermakers	UMCLL Division I
Division II
Creighton University	Omaha, Nebraska	1878	Private/Catholic (Jesuit)	4,133	Bluejays	LSA Division II
Missouri S&T	Rolla, Missouri	1870	Public	6,815	Miners	LSA Division II
Missouri State University	Springfield, Missouri	1905	Public	21,000	Bears	LSA Division II
Rose-Hulman	Terre Haute, Indiana	1874	Private/Nonsectarian	2,000	Fightin' Engineers	Defunct in 2017
Saint Louis University	St. Louis, Missouri	1818	Private/Catholic (Jesuit)	12,733	Billikens	LSA Division II
Southern Illinois University	Carbondale, Illinois	1869	Public	12,000	Salukis	LSA Division II
Washington University in St. Louis	St. Louis, Missouri	1853	Private/nonsectarian	13,527	Bears	LSA Division II

== Conference Champions ==
Division I
Year	Champion	Runner-up
2002		
2003	Missouri S&T	Illinois
2004	Missouri	Illinois
2005	Lindenwood	Illinois
2006	Lindenwood	Illinois
2007	Lindenwood	Illinois
2008	Lindenwood	Illinois
2009	Lindenwood	Illinois
2010	Illinois	Wisconsin
2011	Lindenwood	Illinois
2012	Illinois	Iowa
2013	Purdue	Indiana
2014	Indiana	Illinois
2015	Purdue	Iowa
2016	Purdue	Miami (Ohio)
2017	Miami (Ohio)	Indiana

Division II
Year	Champion	Runner-up
2002		
2003	Lindenwood	Kansas State
2004		
2005	Harding	
2006	Harding	Augusta
2007	Harding	Augusta
2008	Harding	Dordt
2009	Missouri State	Wheaton
2010	Missouri State	Missouri Baptist
2011	Missouri Baptist	Washington University in St. Louis
2012	Washington University in St. Louis	Missouri Baptist
2013	DePaul	Missouri Baptist
2014	Missouri Valley	Washington University in St. Louis
2015	Missouri Valley	Missouri Baptist
2016	Missouri Valley	Lindenwood-Belleville
2017	Missouri State	Saint Louis
