= Upper Midwest Lacrosse Conference =

Men's college club lacrosse league

- Conference: MCLA
- Founded: 1992
- Commissioner: Derek Daehn
- Sports fielded: College lacrosse
- No. of teams: 15
- Region: Midwest
- Website: UMLC

The Upper Midwest Lacrosse Conference (UMLC) is a men's college club lacrosse conference in the Men's Collegiate Lacrosse Association (MCLA). The UMLC includes teams in the Midwest in two divisions - eight teams in Division I and seven teams in Division II.

The conference was established in 1992 when college teams in Minnesota that were playing a loose schedule of tournament weekends decided to organize into a league that had a specific schedule and end of the season tournament. In 2000, the UMLC was accepted into the US Lacrosse Intercollegiate Associates, which became the MCLA in 2006. In 2003, it was announced that the conference would be split into two divisions for the 2004 season and onwards. The conference was known as the Upper Midwest Lacrosse League until 2011.

UMLC Division II teams have dominated at the MCLA National Championships, winning 9 of the last 11 title games. The University of St. Thomas, the 2019 champion, has won 6 titles since 2009.

== Teams ==
Institution	Location	Founded	Type	Enrollment	Tenure	Team Nickname
Division I
East
Indiana University Bloomington	Bloomington, Indiana	1820	Public	45,328	2018–Present	Hoosiers
Miami University	Oxford Ohio	1809	Public	19,752	2018–Present	Redhawks
Michigan State University	East Lansing, Michigan	1855	Public	49,808		Spartans
Western Michigan University	Kalamazoo, Michigan	1903	Public	16,434	2022–Present	Broncos
West
Iowa State University	Ames, Iowa	1858	Public	30,708		Cyclones
Purdue University	West Lafayette, Indiana	1869	Public	49,639	2018–Present	Boilermakers
University of Minnesota	Minneapolis, Minnesota	1851	Public	52,376	2019–Present	Golden Gophers
University of Illinois	Champaign, Illinois	1867	Public	56,607	2018–Present	Fighting Illini
Division II
East
Central Michigan University	Mount Pleasant, Michigan	1892	Public	14,423		Chippewas
Grand Valley State University	Allendale, Michigan	1960	Public	22,406		Lakers
University of Dayton	Dayton, Ohio	1850	Private/Catholic	11,971		Flyers
West
North Dakota State University	Fargo, North Dakota	1890	Public	12,461		Bison
Saint John's University	Collegeville, Minnesota	1857	Private/Catholic (men's university)	1,643		Johnnies
University of Minnesota–Duluth	Duluth, Minnesota	1902	Public	9,884		Bulldogs
University of St. Thomas	St. Paul, Minnesota	1885	Private/Catholic	9,347		Tommies

== Former Teams ==
Name	Location	Mascot	Tenure	Reason for departure
Augsburg University	Minneapolis, Minnesota	Auggies	2008-2011	Defunct in 2011
Bethel University	Arden Hills, Minnesota	Royals	unknown-2014	Defunct in 2014
Butler University	Indianapolis, Indiana	Bulldogs	2022–2025	Defunct
Carleton College	Northfield, Minnesota	Knights	unknown-2013	Defunct in 2013
Central Michigan University	Mount Pleasant, Michigan		2004-2022	Moved to GLLL
Illinois State University	Normal, Illinois		2018-2022	Moved to GLLL
Marquette University	Milwaukee, Wisconsin		unknown-2012	Moved to NCAA Division I Independent
Minnesota State University, Mankato	Mankato, Minnesota		1992-2019	Defunct in 2019
Minnesota State University Moorhead	Moorhead, Minnesota	Drtagons	2003-2010	Defunct in 2010
North Dakota University	Grand Forks, North Dakota	Hawks	2007-2009	Defunct in 2009
St. Cloud State University	St. Cloud, Minnesota		1992-2018	Defunct in 2018
St. Olaf College	Northfield, Minnesota	Oles	unknown-2008	Moved to GLLL
University of Kansas	Lawrence, Kansas	Jayhawks	2018-2021	Moved to LSA, Division I
University of Nebraska–Lincoln	Lincoln, Nebraska	Cornhuskers	2018–2025	Moved to LSA, Division II
University of Missouri	Columbia, Missouri		2018-2021	Moved to LSA, Division I
University of Wisconsin–Eau Claire	Eau Claire, Wisconsin	Blugolds	unknown-2011	Defunct in 2011
University of Wisconsin–Madison	Madison, Wisconsin	Badgers	2010-2014	Defunct in 2014
University of Wisconsin–Milwaukee	Milwaukee, Wisconsin		2010-2010	Moved to GLLL
University of Wisconsin–Stevens Point	Stevens Point, Wisconsin	Pointers	1999-2010	Defunct in 2010
Winona State University	Winona, Minnesota	Warriors	2015-2016	Defunct in 2016

== Conference Championships ==
Division I
Year	Champion	Runner-up
1995	Minnesota Duluth	
1996	Minnesota Duluth	
1997	Minnesota Duluth	
1998	Minnesota Duluth	
1999	Minnesota	Minnesota Duluth
2000	Minnesota State, Mankato	
2001	Minnesota Duluth	Iowa State
2002	Minnesota Duluth	Minnesota
2003	Minnesota Duluth	Minnesota
2004	Minnesota Duluth	Wisconsin–Stevens Point
2005	Minnesota	Minnesota Duluth
2006	Minnesota Duluth	Minnesota
2007	Minnesota Duluth	Minnesota
2008	Minnesota Duluth	St. Cloud State
2009	Minnesota Duluth	Minnesota
2010	Minnesota Duluth	Minnesota
2011	Minnesota Duluth	Minnesota
2012	Minnesota Duluth	Minnesota
2013	Minnesota Duluth	Minnesota
2014	Minnesota Duluth	Minnesota
2015	Minnesota Duluth	Minnesota
2016	Michigan State	Western Michigan
2017	Michigan State	Pittsburgh
2018	Indiana	Purdue
2019	Minnesota	Purdue
2020	No Championship due to COVID-19 pandemic	
2021	No Championship due to COVID-19 pandemic	
2022	Minnesota	Michigan State
2023	Michigan State	Minnesota
2024	Michigan State	Minnesota
2025	Minnesota	Miami (OH)
2026	Michigan State	Minnesota

Division I Championship Records
Team	Championships	Championship years	Runner-up	Runner-up years
Minnesota Duluth	18	1995, 1996, 1997, 1998, 2001, 2002, 2003, 2004, 2006, 2007, 2008, 2009, 2010, 2011, 2012, 2013, 2014, 2015	1	2005
Michigan State	5	2016, 2017, **2018**, 2023, 2024, 2026	1	2022
Minnesota	4	2005, 2019, 2022, 2025	15	2002, 2003, 2006, 2007, 2009, 2010, 2011, 2012, 2013, 2014, 2015, 2018, 2023, 2024, 2026
Minnesota State, Mankato	1	2000		
Iowa State			1	2001
Wisconsin Stevens' Point			1	2004
Western Michigan			1	2016
Pittsburgh			1	2017
Purdue			1	2019
Miami (OH)			1	2025

- Note: **Bold text** denotes MCLA National Champion
- Note: Italic text denotes MCLA National Champion runner-up

Division II
Year	Champion	Runner-up
2004	St. Johns	St. Thomas
2005	St. Johns	St. Thomas
2006	St. Thomas	St. Johns
2007	St. Johns	St. Thomas
2008	St. Johns	St. Thomas
2009	**St. Thomas**	St. Johns
2010	**St Thomas**	St. Johns
2011	St. Johns	St. Thomas
2012	**St. Thomas**	St. Johns
2013	**St. Thomas**	St. Johns
2014	St. Johns	St. Thomas
2015	St. Thomas	North Dakota State
2016	**St. Thomas**	Minnesota Duluth
2017	St. Thomas	St. Johns
2018	St. Thomas	**North Dakota State**
2019	Minnesota Duluth	**St. Thomas**
2020	No Championship due to COVID-19 pandemic	
2021	No Championship due to COVID-19 pandemic	
2022	St. Thomas	Grand Valley State
2023	St. Thomas	**Dayton**
2024	St. Thomas	Grand Valley State
2025	**St. Thomas**	Grand Valley State
2026	**Grand Valley State**	St. Thomas

Division II Championship Records
Team	Championships	Championship years	Runner-up	Runner-up years
St. Thomas	13	2006, **2009**, **2010**, **2012**, **2013**, 2015, **2016**, 2017, 2018, 2022, 2023, 2024, **2025**	8	2004, 2005, 2007, 2008, 2011, 2014, **2019**, 2026
St. Johns	6	2004, 2005, 2007, 2008, 2011, 2014	6	2006, 2009, 2010, 2012, 2013, 2017
Grand Valley State	1	**2026**	3	2022, 2024, 2025
Minnesota Duluth	1	2019	1	2016
North Dakota State			2	2015, **2018**
Dayton			1	**2023**

- Note: **Bold text** denotes MCLA National Champion
- Note: Italic text denotes MCLA National Champion runner-up
