= Women's Collegiate Lacrosse Associates =

American national governing body

The Women's Collegiate Lacrosse Associates (WCLA) is a national organization of over 200 non-NCAA, women's college lacrosse programs organized and run by US Lacrosse, the national governing body. The mission of the WCLA is to promote the growth of women's lacrosse nationwide. Specifically, WCLA strives to provide an infrastructure in which collegiate clubs will compete and eventually crown a National Champion. Until January 2011, the WCLA was known as US Lacrosse Women's Division Intercollegiate Associates (WDIA).

== WCLA National Championship History ==
=== Division I ===
Year	Champion	Score	Defeated	Location
2019	Pittsburgh	15-11	Delaware	Virginia Beach, Virginia
2018	Michigan	11-7	Brigham Young	Round Rock, Texas
2017	Delaware	13-11	Pittsburgh	Salt Lake City, Utah
2016	Georgia	8–7	Minnesota	Winston-Salem, North Carolina
2015	Michigan	11–8	Virginia Tech	Virginia Beach, Virginia
2014	Pittsburgh	12–11	Boston College	Virginia Beach, Virginia
2013	Colorado State	14–4	UCSB	Colorado Springs, Colorado
2012	UC Davis	9–7	Colorado State	Colorado Springs, Colorado
2011	Colorado State	11–9	UCLA	Scottsdale, Arizona
2010	Colorado State	6–4	Cal Poly	Scottsdale, Arizona
2009	Virginia Tech	17–9	Colorado	Scottsdale, Arizona
2008	Colorado State	8–5	Cal Poly	Denver, Colorado
2007	Cal Poly	16–9	Navy	Denver, Colorado
2006	Cal Poly	12–7	Michigan	Plano, Texas
2005	Cal Poly	14–3	Colorado State	Blaine, Minnesota
2004	Cal Poly	15–4	Santa Clara	St. Louis, Missouri
2003	Cal Poly	11–9	UCLA	St. Louis, Missouri
2002	Cal Poly	10–5	Air Force	St. Louis, Missouri
2001	Cal Poly	13–6	Navy	St. Louis, Missouri

Team	Championships	Winning years
Cal Poly	7	2001, 2002, 2003, 2004, 2005, 2006, 2007
Colorado State	4	2008, 2010, 2011, 2013
Michigan	2	2015, 2018
Pittsburgh	2	2014, 2019
Delaware	1	2017
Georgia	1	2016
UC Davis	1	2012
Virginia Tech	1	2009

=== Division II ===
Year	Champion	Score	Defeated	Location
2019	Loyola (Md.)	13-6	Navy	Virginia Beach, Virginia
2018	Loyola (Md.)	14-3	Denver	Round Rock, Texas
2017	Denver	9-6	Loyola (Md.)	Salt Lake City, Utah
2016	Denver	11-10 (OT)	Utah	Winston-Salem, North Carolina
2015	Duke	8–3	Utah	Virginia Beach, Virginia
2014	North Carolina	10–9	James Madison	Virginia Beach, Virginia
2013	James Madison	19-11	Utah	Colorado Springs, Colorado
2012	North Carolina	9–8	Towson	Colorado Springs, Colorado
2011	Chapman	9–8	Towson	Scottsdale, Arizona
2010	Cal Berkeley	14–9	Loyola (Md.)	Scottsdale, Arizona

Team	Championships	Winning years
Denver	2	2012, 2014
Loyola (Md.)	2	2018, 2019
North Carolina	2	2016, 2017
Duke	1	2015
James Madison	1	2013
Chapman	1	2011
Cal Berkeley	1	2010

== WCLA leagues ==
There are nine regional leagues that make up the WCLA. Seven have both Division I and Division II teams:

- Mid Atlantic Women's Lacrosse League
- New England Women's Lacrosse League
- Northwest Women's Lacrosse League
- Rocky Mountain Women's Lacrosse League
- Women's Lacrosse League
- Women's Collegiate Lacrosse League
- Western Women's Lacrosse League

Two leagues offer only one division:

- Southeastern Women's Lacrosse League - Division I only
- National Central Women's Lacrosse League - Division II only

== See also ==
- Men's Collegiate Lacrosse Association
- US Lacrosse
- US Lacrosse Intercollegiate Associates
