= Eastern Intercollegiate Gymnastics League =

American athletics conference

The Eastern Intercollegiate Gymnastics League (EIGL) is an NCAA Division I college athletic conference which sponsors men's gymnastics. It is an affiliate of the Eastern College Athletic Conference (ECAC).

== Members ==
See footnote

- Army Black Knights
- Greenville Panthers
- Navy Midshipmen
- Simpson Storm
- Springfield Pride
- William & Mary Tribe

== Championships ==
Year	Champion	2nd Place	3rd Place
1926	Pennsylvania	unknown	unknown
1927	Dartmouth	unknown	unknown
1928	Princeton	unknown	unknown
1929	Navy	unknown	unknown
1930	Navy (2)	unknown	unknown
1931	Navy (3)	unknown	unknown
1932	Navy (4)	unknown	unknown
1933	Navy (5)	unknown	unknown
1934	Navy (6)	unknown	unknown
1935	Army / Navy (7) / Temple	none; shared title	none; shared title
1936	Temple (2)	unknown	unknown
1937	Army (2) / Temple (3)	none; shared title	unknown
1938	Army (3)	unknown	unknown
1939	Temple (4)	unknown	unknown
1940	Navy (8)	unknown	unknown
1941	Temple (5)	unknown	unknown
1942	Penn State	unknown	unknown
1943	Penn State (2)	unknown	unknown
1944	Navy (9)	unknown	unknown
1945-1946	not held		
1947	Penn State (3)	unknown	unknown
1948	Penn State (4)	unknown	unknown
1949	Temple (6)	unknown	unknown
1950	Army (4) / Syracuse	none; shared title	unknown
1951	Army (5)	unknown	unknown
1952	Army (6)	unknown	unknown
1953	Penn State (5)	unknown	unknown
1954	Penn State (6)	unknown	unknown
1955	Penn State (7)	unknown	unknown
1956	Army (7)	Penn State	Navy
1957	Penn State (8)	unknown	unknown
1958	Army (8)	unknown	unknown
1959	Penn State (9)	unknown	unknown
1960	Army (9)	Penn State	Navy
1961	Navy (10)	Penn State	Army
1962	Army (10)	Penn State	Syracuse
1963	Syracuse (2)	Penn State	Army
1964	Temple (7)	Penn State	Army
1965	Penn State (10)	unknown	unknown
1966	Penn State (11)	unknown	Temple
1967	Penn State (12) / Springfield	none; shared title	Temple
1968	Penn State (13) / Temple (8)	none; shared title	Navy
1969	Penn State (14)	Temple	Massachusetts
1970	Springfield (2)	Temple	Penn State
1971	Penn State (15)	Springfield	Massachusetts
1972	Penn State (16)	Massachusetts	Springfield
1973	Penn State (17)	Navy	Temple
1974	Penn State (18)	Temple	Southern Connecticut
1975	Southern Connecticut	Springfield	Massachusetts
1976	Southern Connecticut (2)	Temple	Springfield
1977	Southern Connecticut (3)	Temple	Springfield
1978	Southern Connecticut (4)	Army	Syracuse
1979	Southern Connecticut (5)	unknown	unknown
1980	Southern Connecticut (6)	Army	Syracuse
1981	Southern Connecticut (7) / Temple (9)	none; shared title	Syracuse
1982	Southern Connecticut (8)	Temple	Navy/Syracuse
1983	Southern Connecticut (9)	Navy	East Stroudsburg
1984	Southern Connecticut (10)	East Stroudsburg	Syracuse
1985	East Stroudsburg / Temple (10)	none; shared title	Southern Connecticut
1986	Temple (11)	Navy	Southern Connecticut
1987	Navy (11)	Temple	Massachusetts
1988	Navy (12)	Temple	Southern Connecticut
1989	Navy (13)	Temple	Massachusetts
1990	Temple (12)	Navy	Syracuse
1991	Temple (13)	Syracuse	Army
1992	Temple (14)	Syracuse	Massachusetts
1993	Temple (15)	Syracuse	Army
1994	Temple (16)	Syracuse	Army
1995	Temple (17)	Syracuse	Massachusetts
1996	Temple (18)	Syracuse	Massachusetts
1997	Temple (19)	Massachusetts	Syracuse
1998	Temple (20)	Massachusetts	Navy
1999	Massachusetts	Army	William & Mary
2000	Massachusetts (2)	Temple	William & Mary
2001	Massachusetts (3)	Temple	William & Mary
2002	Temple (21)	Massachusetts	William & Mary
2003	Temple (22)	Army	William & Mary
2004	Illinois-Chicago	Army	Temple/William & Mary
2005	Army (11)	Temple	William & Mary
2006	William & Mary	Navy	Temple
2007	Temple (23)	Illinois-Chicago	Army
2008	Temple (24)	William & Mary	Illinois-Chicago
2009	Illinois-Chicago (2)	Navy	William & Mary
2010	Illinois-Chicago (3)	Temple	William & Mary
2011	Illinois-Chicago (4)	Temple	William & Mary
2012	Temple (25)	Springfield	Illinois-Chicago
2013	Temple (26)	William & Mary	Illinois-Chicago
2014	William & Mary (2)	Army	Navy
2015	Army (12)	Navy	William & Mary

See footnotes

== See also ==
- NCAA Men's Gymnastics Championships
- East Atlantic Gymnastics League (women)
- List of gymnastics terms
