= Crab Pot Tournament =

Annual college ice hockey tournament in Maryland

The Crab Pot
Tournament information
- Sport: College ice hockey
- Location: Annapolis, Maryland
- Established: 1978; 48 years ago
- Format: Single-elimination
- Venue: Dahlgren Hall (1978–2006); McMullen Hockey Arena (2007–present)
- Teams: 4

Current champion
- TCNJ Lions (2026, 1st title)

The Crab Pot Tournament (also stylized as CrabPot Tournament or Navy Crab Pot) is a men's college ice hockey tournament hosted annually by the United States Naval Academy. The Midshipmen have competed in every edition of the tournament, with local schools such as the University of Maryland and Towson University being regular participants.

It is the oldest college hockey tournament operating at the non-varsity level and one of the oldest extant tournaments for any level of play.

== History ==
Navy Hockey began as an informal student group in the early 1960s and was officially formed as a club (non-varsity) sports team in 1971. In 1975, Steven Gordon became the head coach of the hockey program. Gordon, a former goalie at Northeastern University in the 1970s, had played in the Beanpot tournament in Boston. He and the team created their own version of the competition for the 1977–78 season. The original tournament was slatted to include Ramapo College, the University of Delaware, and Penn State University. Penn State was eventually replaced with Rutgers University.

Crowds of hundreds to thousands regularly attend the two-day tournament at the Naval Academy. In its early years the Crab Pot regularly overlapped with Super Bowl weekend, with the championship game coinciding with the NFL game. This tradition was abandoned in the 1980s and now the tournament regularly takes place in mid-February. Initially the Crab Pot sometimes included varsity NCAA teams. However the majority of the tournament field, and in later years the entirety, has been made up of other non-varsity programs.

The winning team receives the Crab Pot Trophy and has its name hung on a large banner above the ice rink.

== Format ==
The tournament is two rounds over two days, with the first day having all four participants play in semifinal games. The second day features the consolation game and the championship game.

== Year-by-year results ==
Note: If a final standing is not listed in the third column that either means the consolation game did not take place that year or that the information is unavailable.

| Year | Winner | Score | Runner-up | Other Participants (Final standing) | References |
|---|---|---|---|---|---|
| 1978 | Navy Midshipmen | 6–4 | Ramapo College | University of Delaware (3rd); Rutgers University (4th) | |
| 1979 | Ramapo College | 7–6 (OT) | Navy Midshipmen | University of Delaware (3rd); St. John's University (4th) | |
| 1980 | Navy Midshipmen | 8–3 | Ramapo College | West Chester State College (3rd); St. Bonaventure University (4th) | |
| 1981 | Navy Midshipmen | 5–4 | Penn State University | Ramapo College (3rd); West Chester State College (4th) | |
| 1982 | Penn State University | 11–2 | Navy Midshipmen | Upsala College (3rd); Suffolk University (4th) | |
| 1983 | Navy Midshipmen | 6–2 | Penn State University | Canisius College (3rd); University of Delaware (4th) | |
| 1984 | Iona College | 3–0 | Penn State University | Navy Midshipmen; Western New England College | |
| 1985 | Penn State University | 3–1 | Iona College | Navy Midshipmen; Curry College | |
| 1986 | Penn State University | 6–5 | Navy Midshipmen | University of Delaware; West Chester University | |
| 1987 | Penn State University | 7–4 | Navy Midshipmen | University of Delaware; West Chester University | |
| 1988 | Community College of Rhode Island | (Note: Final score not known at this time. It is known Community College of Rhode Island won tournament due to the banner in Navy's rink.) | Navy Midshipmen | University of Delaware (3rd); ~~Fairfield University~~ (wd) | |
| 1989 | Community College of Rhode Island | (Note: Limited information about the 1989 edition is available at this time. It is known Community College of Rhode Island won tournament due to the banner in Navy's rink. The current best source, the University of Delaware historical schedule, has the most concreate information regarding scores and participants. However, it is unclear how Delaware lost the first game then played CCRI in the final as it is currently listed. More information and sources are required.) | | Navy Midshipmen; University of Delaware; Worcester Polytechnic Institute | |
| 1990 | Villanova University | 10–2 | Navy Midshipmen | University of Pennsylvania; West Chester University | |
| 1991 | Navy Midshipmen | 5–3 | West Chester University | University of Rhode Island (3rd); Fordham University (4th) | |
| 1992 | University of Maryland | 6–5 (OT) | Navy Midshipmen | University of West Virginia; Unknown | |
| 1993 | Eastern Michigan University | 5–4 | Navy Midshipmen | Worcester Polytechnic Institute (3rd); University of Maryland (4th) | |
| 1994 | Eastern Michigan University | 8–4 | Towson State University | Royal Military College Saint-Jean (3rd); Navy Midshipmen (4th) | |
| 1995 | Navy Midshipmen | 7–3 | Worcester Polytechnic Institute | Lehigh University (3rd); Massachusetts Institute of Technology (4th) | |
| 1996 | Navy Midshipmen | 5–2 | University of Rhode Island | Unknown; Unknown | |
| 1997 | University at Buffalo | 2–1 | Navy Midshipmen | Marquette University (3rd); Drexel University (4th) | |
| 1998 | University at Buffalo | 5–1 | Navy Midshipmen | United States Coast Guard Academy (3rd); University of Maryland (4th) | |
| 1999 | Towson University | 5–3 | Navy Midshipmen | University at Buffalo (3rd); United States Coast Guard Academy (4th) | |
| 2000 | Towson University | 3–2 | Navy Midshipmen | University of Maryland; Hofstra University | |
| 2001 | Eastern Michigan University | 8–2 | Saint Louis University | Villanova University (3rd); Navy Midshipmen (4th) | |
| 2002 | Navy Midshipmen | 5–1 | Lehigh University | University of West Virginia (3rd); Mercyhurst College (4th) | |
| 2003 | Navy Midshipmen | 9–3 | Mercyhurst College | Villanova University (3rd); Lehigh University (4th) | |
| 2004 | Mercyhurst College | 5–2 | Navy Midshipmen | Towson University (3rd); Villanova University (4th) | |
| 2005 | Mercyhurst College | 7–2 | Navy Midshipmen | Robert Morris University (3rd); Villanova University (4th) | |
| 2006 | Navy Midshipmen | 4–3 | Robert Morris University | Villanova University (3rd); University of Maryland (4th) | |
| 2007 | Liberty University | 11–7 | Navy Midshipmen | University of Maryland; Villanova University | |
| 2008 | Towson University | 4–1 | Navy Midshipmen | University of Maryland, Baltimore County (3rd); University of Maryland (4th) | |
| 2009 | University of Maryland, Baltimore County | 7–4 | Navy Midshipmen | Towson University (3rd); University of Maryland (4th) | |
| 2010 | Towson University | 4–1 | Navy Midshipmen | University of Maryland (3rd); Salisbury University (4th) | |
| 2011 | Navy Midshipmen | 6–2 | Towson University | Penn State Berks (3rd); Lehigh University (4th) | |
| 2012 | Navy Midshipmen | 8–4 | University of Maryland, Baltimore County | Towson University (3rd); University of Maryland (4th) | |
| 2013 | Navy Midshipmen | 4–0 | Towson University | University of Maryland, Baltimore County (3rd); University of Maryland (4th) | |
| 2014 | Navy Midshipmen | 4–2 | Penn State University | University of Maryland (3rd); Towson University (4th) | |
| 2015 | University of Central Oklahoma | 6–1 | Navy Midshipmen | Penn State University (3rd); University of Maryland (4th) | |
| 2016 | Navy Midshipmen | 6–2 | University of Maryland, Baltimore County | University of Maryland (3rd); Georgetown University (4th) | |
| 2017 | Towson University | 5–4 | Navy Midshipmen | University of Maryland, Baltimore County (3rd); University of Maryland (4th) | |
| 2018 | Towson University | 7–2 | Wagner College | Navy Midshipmen (3rd); University of Maryland (4th) | |
| 2019 | Navy Midshipmen | 4–3 (SO) | University of Rhode Island | University of West Virginia (3rd); Towson University (4th) | Final |
| 2020 | Navy Midshipmen | 9–2 | Towson University | Stevenson University (3rd); University of Maryland (4th) | |
| 2021 | Cancelled due to COVID-19 pandemic | | | | |
| 2022 | Navy Midshipmen | 3–1 | Stevenson University | University of Maryland (3rd); Towson University (4th) | |
| 2023 | Navy Midshipmen | 6–3 | University of Maryland | Stevenson University (3rd); Towson University (4th) | |
| 2024 | Navy Midshipmen | 4–3 (SO) | Towson University | The College of New Jersey (3rd); Stevenson University (4th) | |
| 2025 | Navy Midshipmen | 4–1 | University of Maryland | The College of New Jersey (3rd); Towson University (4th) | |
| 2026 | The College of New Jersey | 4–3 (OT) | University of Maryland | Navy Midshipmen (3rd); Towson University (4th) | |

== Statistics ==
| | Championships | | Runner-up | | Semifinalist | |
| | No. | Year(s) | No. | Year(s) | No. | Year(s) |
|---|---|---|---|---|---|---|
| United States Naval Academy | 21 | 1978, 1980, 1981, 1983, 1991, 1995, 1996, 2002, 2003, 2006, 2011, 2012, 2013, 2014, 2016, 2019, 2020, 2022, 2023, 2024, 2025 | 20 | 1979, 1982, 1986, 1987, 1988, 1990, 1992, 1993, 1997, 1998, 1999, 2000, 2004, 2005, 2007, 2008, 2009, 2010, 2015, 2017 | 6 | 1984, 1985, 1994, 2001, 2018, 2026 |

=== Non-Navy participants ===
| School | Championships | | Runner-up | |
| School | No. | Year(s) | No. | Year(s) |
|---|---|---|---|---|
| Towson University | 6 | 1999, 2000, 2008, 2010, 2017, 2018 | 5 | 1994, 2011, 2013, 2020, 2024 |
| Penn State University | 4 | 1982, 1985, 1986, 1987 | 4 | 1981, 1983, 1984, 2014 |
| Eastern Michigan University | 3 | 1993, 1994, 2001 | 0 | |
| Community College of Rhode Island | 2 | 1988, 1989 | 0 | |
| University at Buffalo | 2 | 1997, 1998 | 0 | |
| Mercyhurst College | 2 | 2004, 2005 | 1 | 2003 |
| Ramapo College | 1 | 1979 | 2 | 1978, 1980 |
| Iona University | 1 | 1984 | 1 | 1985 |
| Villanova University | 1 | 1990 | 0 | |
| University of Maryland | 1 | 1992 | 3 | 2023, 2025, 2026 |
| Liberty University | 1 | 2007 | 0 | |
| University of Maryland, Baltimore County | 1 | 2009 | 2 | 2012, 2016 |
| University of Central Oklahoma | 1 | 2015 | 0 | |
| The College of New Jersey | 1 | 2026 | 0 | |
| University of Rhode Island | 0 | | 2 | 1996, 2019 |
| West Chester University | 0 | | 1 | 1991 |
| Worcester Polytechnic Institute | 0 | | 1 | 1995 |
| Saint Louis University | 0 | | 1 | 2001 |
| Robert Morris University | 0 | | 1 | 2006 |
| Wagner College | 0 | | 1 | 2018 |
| Stevenson University | 0 | | 1 | 2022 |

=== Winning Streaks ===
This is a list of all occasions where a Crab Pot team has won at least two consecutive championships between years. The current winning streak, if any, is highlighted in chartreuse . Winning streaks with equal numbers of wins are sorted chronologically, with earlier streaks appearing first.

The longest championship win streak belongs to the U.S. Naval Academy, who won six straight tournaments between 2019 and 2025.

| Titles | Team | First Title | Last Title |
|---|---|---|---|
| 6 | Naval Academy (Note: 2021 edition cancelled, does not interrupt Navy's streak) | 2019 | 2025 |
| 4 | Naval Academy | 2011 | 2014 |
| 3 | Penn State University | 1985 | 1987 |
| 2 | Naval Academy | 1980 | 1981 |
| 2 | C.C.R.I. | 1988 | 1989 |
| 2 | Eastern Michigan University | 1993 | 1994 |
| 2 | Naval Academy | 1995 | 1996 |
| 2 | University at Buffalo | 1997 | 1998 |
| 2 | Towson University | 1999 | 2000 |
| 2 | Naval Academy | 2002 | 2003 |
| 2 | Mercyhurst College | 2004 | 2005 |
| 2 | Towson University | 2017 | 2018 |
