= US Lacrosse Intercollegiate Associates =

The US Lacrosse Intercollegiate Associates (USLIA) are programs created by US Lacrosse, the national governing body for lacrosse in the United States, to foster intercollegiate teams for both men and women prior to the National Collegiate Athletic Association (NCAA) organizing national championships for men in 1971 and for women in 1982. After the NCAA became involved, US Lacrosse shifted its focus to supporting collegiate teams at NCAA schools that did not actually field varsity teams. This has eventually expanded to also include National Association of Intercollegiate Athletics schools, because the NAIA at that time did not recognize lacrosse as a sanctioned sport.

These programs were designated the US Lacrosse Men's Division Intercollegiate Associates (MDIA) and US Lacrosse Women's Division Intercollegiate Associates (WDIA). Over time, it was decided that the MDIA had become too complicated for US Lacrosse to administer and on August 24, 2006, the MDIA Board of Directors announced formation of a new organization called the Men's Collegiate Lacrosse Association (MCLA) as its replacement. It was agreed that the MDIA would cease to exist, that the new MCLA would run its own national tournament and control its own budget, but still sit on US Lacrosse boards and committees. The WDIA in January 2011 was also reorganized and renamed the Women's Collegiate Lacrosse Associates (WCLA).

== Men's division ==
See Men's Collegiate Lacrosse Association (MCLA)

== Women's division ==
See Women's Collegiate Lacrosse Associates (WCLA)
