= Lone Star Alliance =

- Conference: MCLA
- Commissioner: Jason Zantjer
- Sports fielded: College lacrosse; men's: 32; women's: 0
- Division: Division I, II, III
- No. of teams: 32
- Region: South Central United States
- Most recent champions: Division 1: Texas (21st Title) Division 2: Arkansas (2nd Title) Division 3: Kansas State (2nd Title) (2026)
- Most titles: Division 1: Texas (21 Titles) Division 2: Southwestern & Sam Houston State (Tied at 5 Titles) Division 3: Kansas State (2 Titles)
- Website: http://mcla.us/LSA/

The Lone Star Alliance (LSA) is a lacrosse-only athletic conference affiliated with the Men's Collegiate Lacrosse Association (MCLA). The conference incorporates teams in Texas, Oklahoma, Louisiana, Arkansas, Kansas, Missouri, and Nebraska and is divided into three divisions, Division I, Division II, and Division III.

== Teams ==
All of the LSA DI members are members of NCAA Division I. Currently the LSA DI league includes three Big 12 members, six SEC members, and one Atlantic Coast Conference member. Sixteen institutions currently make up the LSA Division II. Six institutions currently make up the LSA Division III. The league comprises members of various NCAA collegiate athletic conferences.

Division I
Institution	Location	Founded	Affiliation	Enrollment	Team Nickname	Tenure
North
Baylor University	Waco, Texas	1845	Private/ Baptist	20,626	Bears	unknown-present
University of Kansas	Lawrence, Kansas	1865	Public	26,780	Jayhawks	unknown-present
University of Missouri	Columbia, Missouri	1839	Public	31,412	Tigers	unknown-present
University of Oklahoma	Norman, Oklahoma	1890	Public	28,042	Sooners	2006–present
University of Mississippi (Ole Miss)	Oxford, Mississippi	1844	Public	21,203	Rebels	2008–present
South
Louisiana State University (LSU)	Baton Rouge, Louisiana	1860	Public	35,912	Tigers	unknown-present
Southern Methodist University (SMU)	University Park, Texas	1911	Private/Methodist	12,385	Mustangs	unknown-present
Texas A&M University	College Station, Texas	1871	Public	72,530	Aggies	unknown-present
University of Texas at Austin	Austin, Texas	1883	Public	51,991	Longhorns	unknown–2019, 2023–present
Texas Christian University (TCU)	Fort Worth, Texas	1873	Private/Disciples of Christ	11,938	Horned Frogs	unknown-present
Division II
North
University of Arkansas	Fayetteville, Arkansas	1871	Public	29,068	Razorbacks	2006–present
Creighton University	Omaha, Nebraska	1878	Private/Jesuit	8,838	Bluejays	1999–2022, 2026–present
Drury University	Springfield, Missouri	1873	Private/ Protestant	1,615	Panthers	2023–present
Missouri State University	Springfield, Missouri	1905	Public	23,505	Bears	2004–present
Oklahoma State University	Stillwater, Oklahoma	1890	Public	24,660	Cowboys	unknown–2019, 2022–present
University of Nebraska–Lincoln	Lincoln, Nebraska	1869	Public	23,954	Cornhuskers	2026–present
Washington University in St. Louis	St. Louis, Missouri	1853	Private	16,973	Bears	unknown-present
South
Dallas Baptist University	Dallas, Texas	1879	Private/Baptist	4,366	Patriots	2015–present
East Texas Baptist University	Marshall, Texas	1912	Private/ Baptist	1,688	Tigers	2021–present
Rice University	Houston, Texas	1891	Private/Non-sectarian	8,285	Owls	unknown-present
Texas State University	San Marcos, Texas	1899	Public	37,864	Bobcats	unknown-present
Texas Tech University	Lubbock, Texas	1923	Public	40,542	Red Raiders	unknown-present
Tulane University	New Orleans, Louisiana	1834	Private	13,127	Green Wave	2014–present
University of Houston	Houston, Texas	1927	Public	47,031	Cougars	unknown-present
University of North Texas	Denton, Texas	1890	Public	42,454	Mean Green	Unknown–2019, 2022–present
University of Texas at San Antonio (UTSA)	San Antonio, Texas	1969	Public	34,734	Roadrunners	2004–present
Division III
Kansas State University	Manhattan, Kansas	1863	Public	20,229	Wildcats	unknown–2020, 2023–present
St. Edward's University	Austin, Texas	1878	Private/Catholic	3,577	Hilltoppers	unknown–present
Tarleton State University	Stephenville, Texas	1899	Public	13,995	Texans	2015–2020, 2023–present
Texas A&M University Corps of Cadets	College Station, Texas	1871	Public	72,530	Aggies	2020–present
Texas A&M University–Galveston	Galveston, Texas	1962	Public	2,324	Sea Aggies	2015–2022, 2026–present
University of Louisiana at Lafayette	Lafayette, Louisiana	1898	Public	16,225	Ragin' Cajuns	2011–2020, 2023–present

== Former Members ==
Former Members
Institution	Location	Team Nickname	Tenure	Current Status	Former LSA Division
Abilene Christian University	Abilene, Texas	Wldcats	2015-2019	Defunct	Division II
Austin College	Sherman, Texas	Kangaroos	2005-2012	Defunct	Division II
Centenary College of Louisiana	Shreveport, Louisiana	Gentlemen	2009-2012	Defunct	Division II
Hardin–Simmons University	Abilene, Texas	Cowboys	2018-2022	Defunct	Division III
Louisiana Tech University	Ruston, Louisiana	Bulldogs	2017-2025	Defunct	Division III
Nicholls State University	Thibodaux, Louisiana	Colonels	2003-2005	Defunct	Division II
Saint Louis University	St. Louis, Missouri	Billikens	1992-2022	Defunct	Division II
Sam Houston State University	Huntsville, Texas	Bearkats	2008-2017, 2023–2025	Defunct	Division III
Southeastern Louisiana University	Hammond, Louisiana	Lions	2017-2021	Defunct	Division II
Southwestern University	Georgetown, Texas	Pirates	2005-2009	NCAA Division III	Division II
Stephen F. Austin State University	Nacogdoches, Texas	Lumberjacks	unknown-2018	Defunct	Division II
St. Gregory's University	Shawnee, Oklahoma	Cavaliers	2015-2016	Defunct	Division II
Texas A&M University–Corpus Christi	Corpus Christi, Texas	Islanders	2014-2025	Defunct	Division III
Trinity University	San Antonio, Texas	Tigers	unknown-2020	Defunct	Division III
University of the Incarnate Word	San Antonio, Texas	Cardinals	2015-2020	Defunct	Division III
University of Mary Hardin-Baylor	Belton, Texas	Crusaders	2012-2013	Defunct	Division II
University of Texas at Arlington	Arlington, Texas	Mavericks	2004-2009	Defunct	Division II
University of Texas at Dallas	Dallas, Texas	Comets	2015-2025	Defunct	Division II
University of Tulsa	Tulsa, Oklahoma	Golden Hurricane	2014-2018	Defunct	Division II

== Championship Records ==
=== Division I ===
Division I Champions
Year	Conference Champion	Runner-up
1976	Texas	
1977	Texas	
1978	Texas	
1979	Texas Tech	Texas A&M
1980	Texas Tech	Baylor
1981	Tulane	Texas Tech
1982	Tulane	
1983	Texas Tech	
1984	Texas Tech	
1985	Texas Tech	
1986	Texas Tech	
1987	Texas	
1988	Texas Tech	Texas
1989	Southwestern	Texas
1990	Texas	Texas A&M
1991	Texas A&M	Texas Tech
1992	Texas Tech	Texas A&M
1993	Texas A&M	Rice
1994	Texas A&M	
1995	Texas	
1996	Texas	Texas A&M
1997	Texas	Texas A&M
1998	Texas	Texas A&M
1999	Texas	Texas A&M
2000	Texas A&M	Texas
2001	Texas A&M	Texas
2002	Texas A&M	Texas
2003	Texas A&M	Texas Tech
2004	Texas	Texas A&M
2005	Texas Tech	Texas
2006	Texas	Texas Tech
2007	Texas A&M	Texas
2008	Texas A&M	Texas
2009	Texas	North Texas
2010	Texas State	Texas
2011	Texas	Southern Methodist
2012	Texas	Texas State
2013	Texas	Texas State
2014	Texas	Texas State
2015	Texas State	Texas
2016	Southern Methodist	Texas State
2017	Southern Methodist	Oklahoma
2018	Texas A&M	Oklahoma
2019	Louisiana State	Texas
2020	No Championship due to COVID-19 pandemic	
2021	No Championship due to COVID-19 pandemic	
2022	Texas Christian	Texas A&M
2023	Texas	Southern Methodist
2024	Texas	Texas A&M
2025	Texas	Southern Methodist
2026	Texas	Texas Christian

Division I Records
Team	Championships	Championship years	Runner-up	Runner-up years
Texas	21	1976, 1977, 1978, 1987, 1990, 1995, 1996, 1997, 1998, 1999, 2004, 2006, 2009, 2011, 2012, 2013, 2014, 2023, 2024, 2025, 2026	11	1988, 1989, 1990, 2001, 2002, 2005, 2007, 2008, 2010, 2015, 2019
Texas A&M	10	1991, 1993, 1994, 2000, 2001, 2002, 2003, 2007, 2008, 2018	10	1979, 1990, 1992, 1996, 1997, 1998, 1999, 2004, 2022, 2024
Texas Tech	9	1979, 1980, 1983, 1984, 1985, 1986, 1988, 1992, 2005	3	1981, 2003, 2006
Texas State	3	2010, 2015, 2016	3	2012, 2013, 2014
Tulane	2	1981, 1982		
Southwestern	1	1989		
Southern Methodist	1	2017	4	2011, 2016, 2023, 2025
Louisiana State	1	2019		
Texas Christian	1	2022	1	2026
Oklahoma			2	2017, 2018
Baylor			1	1980
Rice			1	1993
North Texas			1	2009

Note: From 1976 to 1990 the LSA was known as the SWLA (South Western Lacrosse Association)

=== Division II ===
Division II Champions
Year	Conference Champion	Runner-up
2003	St. Edward's	Houston
2004	UT Arlington	Nicholls State
2005	Southwestern	UT Arlington
2006	Southwestern	St. Edward's
2007	Southwestern	Texas Christian
2008	Southwestern	St. Edward's
2009	Southwestern	Sam Houston State
2010	Sam Houston State	Centenary College
2011	Sam Houston State	St. Edward's
2012	Sam Houston State	UL Lafayette
2013	Sam Houston State	Houston
2014	Sam Houston State	TAMU Corpus Christi
2015	Oklahoma State	St. Gregory's
2016	UL Lafayette	UT Dallas
2017	UL Lafayette	UT Dallas
2018	Missouri State	UT Dallas
2019	Missouri State	Rice
2020	No Championship due to COVID-19 pandemic	
2021	No Championship due to COVID-19 pandemic	
2022	Missouri State	Tulane
2023	Missouri State	Baylor
2024	Tulane	Missouri State
2025	Arkansas	Tulane
2026	Arkansas	Oklahoma State

Division II Records
Team	Championships	Championship years	Runner-up	Runner-up years
Southwestern	5	2005, 2006, 2007, 2008, 2009		
Sam Houston State	5	2010, 2011, 2012, 2013, 2014	1	2009
Missouri State	4	2018, 2019, 2022, 2023	1	2024
UL Lafayette	2	2016, 2017	1	2012
Arkansas	2	2025, 2026		
St. Edward's	1	2003	3	2006, 2008, 2011
UT Arlington	1	2004	1	2005
Oklahoma State	1	2015	1	2026
Tulane	1	2024	2	2022, 2025
UT Dallas			3	2016, 2017, 2018
Houston			2	2003, 2013
Nicholls State			1	2004
Texas Christian			1	2007
Centenary College			1	2010
TAMU Corpus Christi			1	2014
St. Gregory's			1	2015
Rice			1	2019
Baylor			1	2023

=== Division III ===
Division III Champions
Year	Conference Champion	Runner-up
2023	Kansas State	Sam Houston State
2024	UL Lafayette	Houston
2025	No Championships held	
2026	Kansas State	Texas A&M - Galveston

Team	Championships	Championship years	Runner-up	Runner-up years
Kansas State	2	2023, 2026		
UL Lafayette	1	2024		
Sam Houston State			1	2023
Houston			1	2024
Texas A&M - Galveston			1	2026
