= USA Lacrosse =

Sports governing body in the United States

- Headquarters features the IWLCA Building, Tierney Field and the National Lacrosse Hall of Fame and Museum

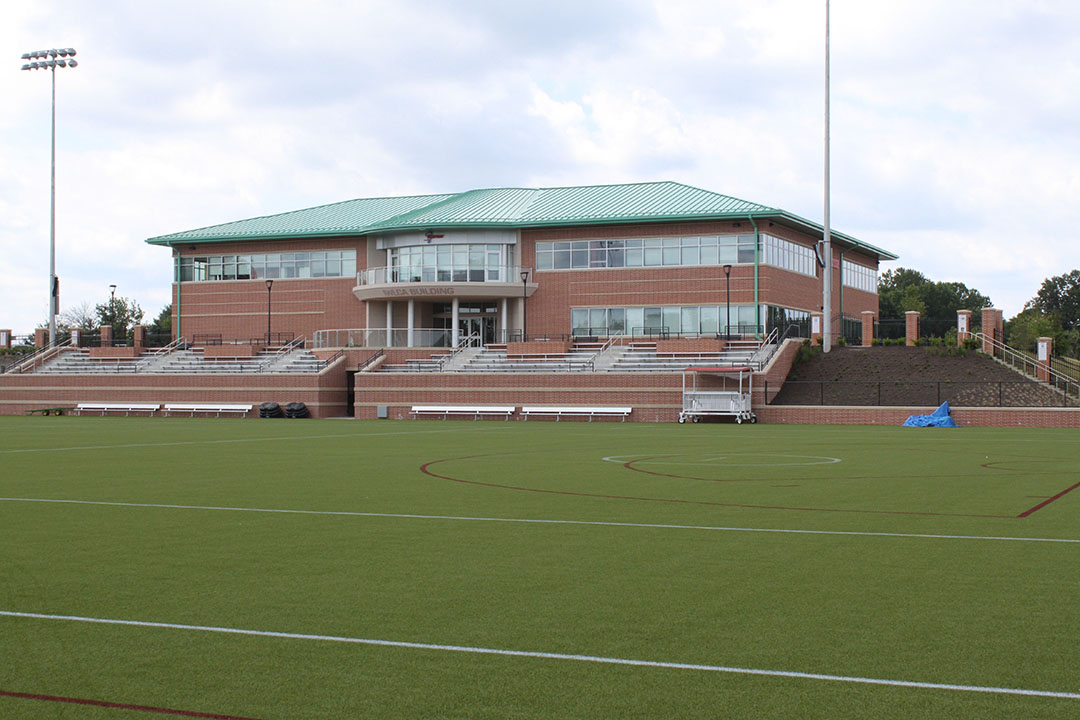
- Sport: Lacrosse
- Jurisdiction: National
- Founded: January 1, 1998
- Affiliation: World Lacrosse
- Regional affiliation: Pan-American Lacrosse Association
- Headquarters: Sparks, Maryland
- Chairperson: Sarah Bullard McDaniel
- CEO: Marc Riccio
- Men's coach: Seth Tierney
- Women's coach: Acacia Walker Weinstein

Official website
- www.usalacrosse.com
- (United States)

USA Lacrosse is the National Governing Body (NGB) of men and women's lacrosse in the United States, having received formal certification from the United States Olympic & Paralympic Committee on April 15, 2026. It provides a leadership role in virtually every aspect of the game and has more than 425,000 members throughout the United States, and offers programs and services to inspire participation while protecting the integrity of the sport. The USA Lacrosse national headquarters is located in Sparks, Maryland along with the Lacrosse Museum and National Hall of Fame. In addition, the headquarters campus features the IWLCA Building, Tierney Field and a memorial to the members of the lacrosse community that died in the September 11, 2001 terrorist attacks. USA Lacrosse also oversees the U.S. National Team Program, which have won a combined 36 world championships, and the sport has been added to the 2028 Summer Olympics.

== History ==
USA Lacrosse was founded on January 1, 1998. It resulted from the merger of many different groups, including the Lacrosse Foundation, the United States Women's Lacrosse Association, the National Junior Lacrosse Association, the United States Lacrosse Officials Association, United States Lacrosse Coaches Association, United States Club Lacrosse Association, the US Lacrosse Intercollegiate Associates, the Central Atlantic Lacrosse League and National Intercollegiate Lacrosse Officials Association. Lacrosse is one of the fastest-growing sports in the United States.

== Structure and function ==
USA Lacrosse policy is determined by a national board of directors. A number of board committees, subcommittees and task forces help to shape strategy, planning and design of initiatives with direct board access for support and approval.

While serving as the sport's governing body, USA Lacrosse works in collaboration with both the National Collegiate Athletic Association (NCAA) and the National Federation of State High School Associations (NFHS) to oversee the game within the schools and colleges. NCAA and NFHS activity in lacrosse is almost exclusively focused on rules, with the additional NCAA focus on staging a postseason tournament. USA Lacrosse is essentially responsible for everything else related to the development of and service to the sport as its governing body.

The NCAA governs college post-season play and writes rules for college post season competitive play for the sport, which have traditionally been adopted for regular season play by all men’s and women’s college lacrosse conferences and independents.

The NFHS is a body that provides support and coordination to each independent state high school athletic association. However, each state association operates independently of the NFHS and sets its own regulations and policies. The NFHS has committees that write/review rules for sports. The NFHS has an independent rules committee for boys’ and girls' lacrosse on which USA Lacrosse is represented.

USA Lacrosse also publishes USA Lacrosse Magazine six times per year, with a circulation to over 400,000 USA Lacrosse members. Its mission is to "connect the sports community, educate players, coaches and officials, entertain fans and keep the membership of USA Lacrosse informed." In addition to the print magazine, USA Lacrosse maintains USA Lacrosse Magazine Online, which features daily national, regional and international lacrosse news, information, and scores, along with original features.

== Membership ==
Fans, players, parents, coaches and officials can all be members of USA Lacrosse. USA Lacrosse members receive access to a variety of programs and services, discounts on books, videos, educational materials and U.S. National Team fan merchandise. Additionally, all members receive digital and print issues of USA Lacrosse Magazine, comprehensive lacrosse insurance, free admission to the Lacrosse Museum and National Hall of Fame and discounts on products and services while supporting the mission of the organization and of the sport at large.

== U.S. National Teams ==
As the United States is a full member of World Lacrosse, it takes part in all competitions organized and sanctioned by it. USA Lacrosse oversees all aspects of the U.S. Men's and Women's National, Sixes, Under-20 and Box Team programs.

The U.S. Men's National Team has won 11 World Lacrosse Championships, world championships in field lacrosse at the senior team level and won six straight World Championships from 1982 to 2002. The last World Championships were held in San Diego in 2023 with the U.S. beating Canada in the gold medal game. In the U20 age group (formerly U19), the United States won the first nine championships before Canada edged the U.S. 6-5 in the gold medal game in 2025 on Jeju Island, South Korea.

The U.S. Women's National Team has won nine Women's Lacrosse World Cups. The most recent World Cup was held in Towson, Maryland in July 2022, where the U.S. defeated Canada 11-8 in the championship. In the women's Under-20 World Lacrosse Championships, the United States has won world championships in 1999, 2003, 2007, 2011, 2019 and 2024. The U.S. women also won the inaugural World Lacrosse Box Championship in 2024.

Lacrosse will return to the Summer Olympic Games in Los Angeles in 2028 as a medal sport for the first time in over a century. The Olympics will use the new sixes discipline of the sport which made its international debut at 2022 World Games in Birmingham, Ala. The U.S. men and women both won silver with Canada capturing gold. Women's lacrosse sixes was also contested at 2025 World Games in Chengdu, China. The U.S. women defeated Canada in the gold medal game with Marie McCool earning MVP honors.

== Facility ==
USA Lacrosse moved to its current location in May 2016 and formally dedicated the new facility on Sept. 11, 2016. The facility is the result of a $15 million capital campaign entirely funded by private donors. Previously, the organization's headquarters were located in Baltimore adjacent to Homewood Field on the Johns Hopkins University campus.

The IWLCA Building at USA Lacrosse National Headquarters is the centerpiece of the campus. The three-level 45,000 square foot structure hosts office and meeting space for the US Lacrosse staff, the Crum Family Education and Training Center, and locker rooms. A new National Lacrosse Hall of Fame and Museum, features the Richie Moran Hall of Fame Gallery and displays highlighting the heritage of the sport and the evolution to the modern game.

The building overlooks William G. Tierney Field, which will be the training home for the U.S. National Teams Program. The intimate, lighted facility boasts a permanent seating area for 500 fans and berms surround the field that will allow for additional spectators.

In addition to serving as the training facility for Team USA, Tierney Field hosts numerous college, high school and youth games each year along with coaching, officiating and player education clinics.

Just above the seating area to Tierney Field is the Henry A. Rosenberg Jr. Promenade, which includes The Creator’s Game statue sculpted by Jud Hartmann that was moved from the old USA Lacrosse headquarters. The promenade also includes 21 pillars honoring college lacrosse programs from around the country.

Surrounding the south end of the field is the Chris Sailer Trail honoring 11 Intercollegiate Women’s Lacrosse Coaches Association Trailblazers: Pat Genovese, Tina Sloan Green, Caroline Haussermann, Kathy Heinze, Carole Kleinfelder, Gillian Rattray, Sue Stahl, Sue Tyler, Lanetta Ware, Marge Watson and Judy Wolstenholme.

Located off the trail is the 9/11 Memorial, honoring the nearly 70 individuals from the lacrosse community that died during the terrorist attacks on Sept. 11, 2001. Landscape architect Kris Snider, a former All-American player at the University of Virginia, designed the memorial.

== Lacrosse Museum and National Hall of Fame ==
USA Lacrosse operates the Lacrosse Museum and National Hall of Fame at its headquarters in Sparks, Maryland. The new facility opened to the public in September 2016. Each year, members are inducted into the Hall of Fame for their contributions to the sport.
