= McMullen Hockey Arena =

Ice hockey rink at the United States Naval Academy

- Interactive map of McMullen Hockey Arena
- Location: 64 Greenbury Point Road, Annapolis, Maryland
- Coordinates: 38°59′37″N 76°27′33″W
- Owner: U.S. Naval Academy
- Operator: U.S. Naval Academy
- Capacity: 2,648 (hockey)
- Surface: 200x98 feet (ice hockey)

Construction
- Opened: 2007
- Cost: $16.5 million (entire Brigade Sports Complex)

Tenants
- Navy Midshipmen (men's and women's hockey)

The McMullen Hockey Arena is a 600-seat ice hockey rink, located on the campus of the United States Naval Academy (USNA) in Annapolis, Maryland and is named for Dr. John J. McMullen, Naval Academy Class of 1940. It is home to the USNA's 2 Club Men's Hockey teams and one Women's Club Hockey team, currently competing at the ACHA Division I level in the Eastern Collegiate Hockey Association and the Delaware Valley College Hockey Conference.

The arena features a regulation, Olympic-sized ice sheet for ice hockey, seating for around 600 spectators, and room for expansion.

McMullen Hockey Arena was built in 2007 as part of the Thornton D. and Elizabeth S. Hooper Brigade Sports Complex, which also includes the Tose Family Tennis Center, rugby venues, an indoor hitting, chipping and putting facility for the golf team and club members, the pro shop for the golf course, a fitness center, athletic training rooms, locker rooms, office space, meeting rooms, and a restaurant.
