= MCLA Division II Championship appearances by school =

The following is a list of Men's Collegiate Lacrosse Association (MCLA) Division II college lacrosse teams that have qualified for its Division II Championship, with teams listed by number of appearances.

The list is up to date through the 2025 tournament.

MCLA Division I Championship
Team	Tournament appearances	Tournament years	Tournament Record	Tournament debut	Last tournament	Best result
St. Thomas (MN)	18	2006, 2007, 2008, 2009, 2010, 2011, 2012, 2013, 2014, 2015, 2016, 2017, 2018, 2019, 2022, 2023, 2024, 2025	49–11 (.817)	2006	2025	Champions (2009, 2010, 2012, 2013, 2016, 2019, 2025)
Grand Valley State	15	2008, 2010, 2011, 2012, 2013, 2014, 2015, 2016, 2017, 2018, 2019, 2022, 2023, 2024, 2025	28–14 (.667)	2008	2025	Champions (2014)
St. John's	14	2005, 2006, 2007, 2008, 2009, 2010, 2011, 2012, 2013, 2014, 2015, 2017, 2018, 2019	18–14 (.563)	2005	2019	Runners-up (2006, 2007, 2014)
Dayton	13	2007, 2008, 2009, 2010, 2011, 2012, 2014, 2015, 2016, 2017, 2018, 2019, 2023	26–11 (.703)	2007	2023	Champions (2007, 2023)
North Dakota State	12	2011, 2012, 2013, 2014, 2015, 2016, 2017, 2018, 2019, 2022, 2023, 2025	14–11 (.560)	2011	2025	Champions (2018)
Montana	9	2005, 2006, 2007, 2017, 2019, 2022, 2023, 2024, 2025	8–8 (.500)	2005	2025	Champions (2007)
Missouri State	8	2009, 2010, 2017, 2018, 2019, 2022, 2023, 2024	1–8 (.111)	2009	2024	Quarterfinals (2022)
Montana State	8	2014, 2016, 2018, 2019, 2022, 2023, 2024, 2025	6–7 (.462)	2014	2025	Champions (2024)
Kennesaw State	7	2015, 2016, 2018, 2019, 2022, 2023, 2024	3–7 (.300)	2015	2024	Quarterfinals (2016, 2018, 2024)
Western Oregon	7	2008, 2009, 2010, 2011, 2012, 2013, 2014	3–7 (.300)	2008	2014	Quarterfinals (2008, 2009, 2014)
Westminster	7	2007, 2008, 2009, 2010, 2011, 2012, 2013	12–6 (.667)	2007	2013	Champions (2008)
Cal State Fullerton	6	2009, 2010, 2011, 2015, 2017, 2018	0–6 (.000)	2009	2018	First Round (2009, 2010, 2011, 2015, 2017, 2018)
Concordia-Irvine	6	2012, 2013, 2014, 2015, 2016, 2017	8–5 (.615)	2012	2017	Champions (2017)
Florida Gulf Coast	6	2014, 2015, 2017, 2018, 2022, 2023	2–6 (.250)	2014	2023	Quarterfinals (2015, 2018)
Briarcliffe	5	2010, 2011, 2012, 2013, 2015	1–5 (.167)	2010	2015	Quarterfinals (2011)
Bridgewater State	5	2016, 2017, 2019, 2024, 2025	0–5 (.000)	2016	2025	First Round (2016, 2017, 2019, 2024, 2025)
Cal State San Marcos	5	2018, 2022, 2023, 2024, 2025	5–5 (.500)	2018	2025	Semifinals (2023)
Grove City	5	2010, 2013, 2014, 2015, 2016	3–5 (.375)	2010	2016	Quarterfinals (2010, 2013, 2014)
Minnesota-Duluth	5	2016, 2017, 2018, 2019, 2023	4–5 (.444)	2016	2023	Semifinals (2018)
SCAD	5	2010, 2011, 2012, 2013, 2014	1–5 (.167)	2010	2014	Quarterfinals (2011)
Southwestern	5	2005, 2006, 2007, 2008, 2009	1–5 (.167)	2005	2009	Quarterfinals (2005, 2008)
UC San Diego	5	2019, 2022, 2023, 2024, 2025	0–5 (.000)	2019	2025	First Round (2019, 2022, 2023, 2024, 2025)
College of Idaho	4	2018, 2019, 2022, 2025	2–4 (.333)	2018	2025	Semifinals (2018)
Davenport	4	2009, 2010, 2011, 2012	9–3 (.750)	2009	2012	Champions (2011)
Florida Atlantic	4	2022, 2023, 2024, 2025	3–4 (.429)	2022	2025	Semifinals (2025)
Harding	4	2005, 2006, 2007, 2008	2–4 (.333)	2005	2008	Semifinals (2005)
Northern Colorado	4	2006, 2007, 2009, 2011	3–4 (.429)	2006	2011	Quarterfinals (2006, 2007, 2009)
Rhode Island	4	2022, 2023, 2024, 2025	4–4 (.500)	2022	2025	Runners-up (2022)
Sam Houston State	4	2010, 2011, 2012, 2013	0–4 (.000)	2010	2013	First Round (2010, 2011, 2012, 2013)
Sierra Nevada	4	2015, 2016, 2017, 2018	1–4 (.200)	2015	2018	Quarterfinals (2017)
UNC-Charlotte	4	2022, 2023, 2024, 2025	3–4 (.429)	2022	2025	Quarterfinals (2022, 2023, 2025)
Utah State	4	2015, 2019, 2022, 2025	0–4 (.000)	2015	2025	First Round (2015, 2019, 2022, 2025)
Utah Valley	4	2005, 2006, 2010, 2011	5–4 (.556)	2005	2011	Runners-up (2005, 2010)
Western Washington	4	2007, 2010, 2014, 2015	2–4 (.333)	2007	2015	Semifinals (2015)
Air Force	3	2023, 2024, 2025	6–3 (.667)	2023	2025	Semifinals (2023, 2024, 2025)
Elon	3	2008, 2010, 2012	1–3 (.250)	2008	2012	Quarterfinals (2008)
Missouri Valley	3	2014, 2015, 2016	0–3 (.000)	2014	2016	First Round (2014, 2015, 2016)
UC Davis	3	2018, 2019, 2025	0–3 (.000)	2018	2025	First Round (2018, 2019, 2025)
Calvin	2	2005, 2006	0–2 (.000)	2005	2006	First Round (2005, 2006)
Coast Guard	2	2013, 2014	1–2 (.333)	2013	2014	Quarterfinals (2013)
Emory	2	2007, 2009	2–2 (.500)	2007	2009	Quarterfinals (2007, 2009)
Fort Lewis	2	2007, 2008	0–2 (.000)	2007	2008	First Round (2007, 2008)
Indiana Tech	2	2013, 2014	2–2 (.500)	2013	2014	Quarterfinals (2013, 2014)
Northwest Nazarene	2	2024, 2025	2–2 (.500)	2024	2025	Quarterfinals (2024, 2025)
Palm Beach Atlantic	2	2013, 2017	0–2 (.000)	2013	2017	First Round (2013, 2017)
Reinhardt	2	2014, 2016	2–2 (.500)	2014	2016	Semifinals (2016)
San Diego	2	2005, 2006	6–0 (1.000)	2005	2006	Champions (2005, 2006)
Siena Heights	2	2015, 2016	1–2 (.333)	2015	2016	Quarterfinals (2015)
Augustana	1	2006	0–1 (.000)	2006	2006	First Round (2006)
Central Connecticut State	1	2018	0–1 (.000)	2018	2018	First Round (2018)
Claremont	1	2006	0–1 (.000)	2006	2006	First Round (2006)
Coastal Carolina	1	2024	0–1 (.000)	2024	2024	First Round (2024)
Davidson	1	2005	0–1 (.000)	2005	2005	First Round (2005)
DePaul	1	2013	0–1 (.000)	2013	2013	First Round (2013)
Eckerd	1	2006	2–1 (.667)	2006	2006	Semifinals (2006)
Framingham State	1	2008	0–1 (.000)	2008	2008	First Round (2008)
Grand Canyon	1	2012	1–1 (.500)	2012	2012	Quarterfinals (2012)
Hope	1	2011	0–1 (.000)	2011	2011	First Round (2011)
Liberty	1	2013	2–1 (.667)	2013	2013	Semifinals (2013)
Louisiana	1	2017	0–1 (.000)	2017	2017	First Round (2017)
Lourdes	1	2016	1–1 (.500)	2016	2016	Quarterfinals (2016)
Metro State	1	2017	0–1 (.000)	2017	2017	First Round (2017)
Missouri Baptist	1	2011	0–1 (.000)	2011	2011	First Round (2011)
North Florida	1	2019	1–1 (.500)	2019	2019	Quarterfinals (2019)
Northern Arizona	1	2019	0–1 (.000)	2019	2019	First Round (2019)
Saint Mary's (CA)	1	2012	0–1 (.000)	2012	2012	First Round (2012)
Southern Oregon	1	2016	0–1 (.000)	2016	2016	First Round (2016)
Stonehill	1	2009	0–1 (.000)	2009	2009	First Round (2009)
Tulane	1	2024	0–1 (.000)	2024	2024	First Round (2024)
UC Irvine	1	2007	0–1 (.000)	2007	2007	First Round (2007)
UC Santa Cruz	1	2008	0–1 (.000)	2008	2008	First Round (2008)
Utah	1	2022	4–0 (1.000)	2022	2022	Champions (2022)
Wake Forest	1	2025	0–1 (.000)	2025	2025	First Round (2025)
Washington St. Louis	1	2012	0–1 (.000)	2012	2012	First Round (2022)

== See also ==
- MCLA Division I Championship appearances by school
