= MCLA Division I Championship appearances by school =

The following is a list of Men's Collegiate Lacrosse Association (MCLA) Division I college lacrosse teams that have qualified for its Division I Championship, with teams listed by number of appearances.

The list is up to date through the 2025 tournament.

MCLA Division I Championship
Team	Tournament appearances	Tournament years	Tournament Record	Tournament debut	Last tournament	Best result
Brigham Young	26	1997, 1998, 1999, 2000, 2001, 2002, 2003, 2004, 2005, 2006, 2007, 2008, 2009, 2010, 2011, 2012, 2013. 2014, 2015, 2016, 2017, 2018, 2022, 2023, 2024, 2025	50–21 (.704)	1997	2025	Champions (1997, 2000, 2007, 2011, 2024)
Colorado	21	1999, 2000, 2001, 2003, 2004, 2005, 2006, 2007, 2009, 2010, 2011, 2012, 2013, 2014, 2015, 2016, 2017, 2018, 2019, 2024, 2025	23–18 (.561)	1999	2025	Champions (2014)
Colorado State	18	1998, 1999, 2000, 2001, 2002, 2003, 2004, 2006, 2007, 2008, 2009, 2010, 2011, 2012, 2013, 2014, 2016, 2017	35–12 (.745)	1998	2017	Champions (1999, 2001, 2003, 2006, 2012, 2013)
UC Santa Barbara	18	1997, 2001, 2002, 2003, 2004, 2005, 2006, 2007, 2008, 2009, 2011, 2012, 2013, 2014, 2016, 2023, 2024, 2025	27–16 (.628)	1997	2025	Champions (2004, 2005)
Virginia Tech	16	1997, 1998, 2000, 2001, 2002, 2005, 2008, 2009, 2012, 2014, 2015, 2017, 2018, 2022, 2023, 2024	12–16 (.429)	1997	2024	Runners-Up (2023)
Cal Poly	15	2002, 2003, 2004, 2006, 2009, 2010, 2011, 2012, 2014, 2015, 2016, 2017, 2019, 2022, 2025	8–15 (.348)	2002	2025	Runners-Up (2012, 2016)
Chapman	15	2003, 2008, 2009, 2010, 2011, 2012, 2013, 2014, 2015, 2016, 2017, 2018, 2019, 2023, 2024	28–14 (.667)	2003	2024	Champions (2016)
Arizona State	13	2007, 2008, 2010, 2011, 2012, 2013, 2014, 2015, 2016, 2017, 2019, 2024, 2025	20–13 (.606)	2007	2025	Runners-Up (2010, 2011, 2014)
Boston College	13	2003, 2004, 2007, 2008, 2009, 2010, 2011, 2013, 2014, 2016, 2018, 2022, 2023	4–13 (.235)	2003	2023	Quarterfinals (2007, 2011, 2014, 2016)
Michigan	13	1999, 2000, 2001, 2002, 2003, 2004, 2005, 2006, 2007, 2008, 2009, 2010, 2011	22–10 (.688)	1999	2011	Champions (2008, 2009, 2010)
Simon Fraser	13	1997, 2998, 1999, 2000, 2001, 2003, 2004, 2008, 2009, 2010, 2014, 2023, 2024	9–13 (.409)	1997	2024	Runners-Up (1999)
Michigan State	12	2010, 2011, 2012, 2013, 2014, 2015, 2016, 2017, 2018, 2019, 2023, 2024	7–11 (.389)	2010	2024	Champions (2018)
Minnesota-Duluth	12	2001, 2002, 2003, 2004, 2006, 2007, 2008, 2009, 2010, 2011, 2012, 2014	4–12 (.250)	2001	2014	Quarterfinals (2007, 2008, 2009, 2010)
Sonoma State	12	1999, 2000, 2001, 2002, 2003, 2004, 2005, 2006, 2007, 2008, 2009, 2013	17–11 (.607)	1999	2013	Champions (2002)
California	11	1998, 1999, 2000, 2001, 2002, 2012, 2016, 2017, 2019, 2024	13–10 (.565)	1998	2024	Champions (1998)
Oregon	11	2004, 2005, 2006, 2007, 2009, 2010, 2011, 2012, 2013, 2017, 2018	7–11 (.389)	2004	2018	Runners-Up (2007)
Texas	11	1997, 2004, 2006, 2009, 2011, 2012, 2013, 2014, 2023, 2024, 2025	2–11 (.154)	1997	2025	Quarterfinals (1997, 2024, 2025)
Arizona	10	1997, 1999, 2001, 2002, 2004, 2005, 2006, 2007, 2016, 2022	4–10 (.286)	1997	2022	Semifinals (1997)
Florida State	10	2004, 2005, 2006, 2008, 2009, 2010, 2011, 2017, 2019, 2025	5–10 (.333)	2004	2025	Semifinals (2005)
Georgia Tech	10	2004, 2015, 2016, 2017, 2018, 2019, 2022, 2023, 2024, 2025	12–6 (.667)	2004	2024	Runners-Up (2022, 2025)
Texas A&M	9	1999, 2000, 2001, 2002, 2003, 2007, 2008, 2018, 2019	2–9 (.182)	1999	2019	Quarterfinals (2000, 2003)
Northeastern	8	2005, 2006, 2007, 2014, 2017, 2023, 2024, 2025	2–8 (.200)	2005	2025	Quarterfinals (2007, 2025)
Florida	7	2003, 2007, 2008, 2010, 2022, 2023, 2025	2–7 (.222)	2003	2025	Quarterfinals (2003, 2025)
Grand Canyon	6	2013, 2015, 2016, 2017, 2018, 2022	10–3 (.769)	2013	2022	Champions (2015, 2017)
Liberty	6	2018, 2019, 2022, 2023, 2024, 2025	11–5 (.688)	2018	2025	Champions (2025)
Lindenwood	6	2005, 2006, 2007, 2008, 2009, 2011	0–6 (.000)	2005	2011	First Round (2005, 2006, 2007, 2008, 2009, 2011)
Georgia	5	1998, 2007, 2008, 2013, 2023	2–5 (.286)	1998	2023	Quarterfinals (1998, 2008, 2023)
Illinois	5	1997, 1998, 1999, 2010, 2012	0–5 (.000)	1997	2012	Quarterfinals (1997, 1998)
Tennessee	5	1999, 2000, 2001, 2024, 2025	1–4 (.200)	1999	2025	Quarterfinals (1999)
Auburn	4	1997, 1999, 2001, 2002	1–4 (.200)	1997	2002	Quarterfinals (1997, 2002)
Condordia-Irvine	4	2018, 2019, 2022, 2023	5–3 (.625)	2018	2023	Champions (2023)
Minnesota	4	2005, 2019, 2022, 2025	1–4 (.200)	2005	2025	Quarterfinals (2022)
South Carolina	4	2018, 2019, 2022, 2023	10–2 (.833)	2018	2023	Champions (2019, 2022)
Stanford	4	2001, 2002, 2013, 2015	5–4 (.556)	2001	2015	Runners-Up (2001)
Buffalo	3	2002, 2011, 2012	1–3 (.250)	2002	2012	Quarterfinals (2012)
New Hampshire	3	2000, 2002, 2019	0–3 (.000)	2000	2019	First Round (2000, 2002, 2019)
Oakland	3	2003, 2005, 2006	0–3 (.000)	2003	2006	First Round (2003, 2005, 2006)
Purdue	3	2013, 2015, 2016	0–3 (.000)	2013	2016	First Round (2013, 2015, 2016)
San Diego State	3	2015, 2024, 2025	1–3 (.250)	2015	2025	Quarterfinals (2024)
Utah	3	2005, 2017, 2018	1–3 (.250)	2005	2018	Quarterfinals (2018)
Utah Valley	3	2023, 2024, 2025	6–3 (.667)	2023	2025	Runners-Up (2024)
Boise State	2	2022, 2025	0–2 (.000)	2022	2025	First Round (2022, 2025)
Connecticut	2	2015, 2019	0–2 (.000)	2015	2019	First Round (2015, 2019)
Indiana	2	2014, 2018	0–2 (.000)	2014	2018	First Round (2014, 2018)
Southern Methodist	2	2016, 2017	0–2 (.000)	2016	2017	First Round (2016, 2017)
Texas State	2	2010, 2015	0–2 (.000)	2010	2015	First Round (2010, 2015)
UC San Diego	2	2005, 2006	0–2 (.000)	2005	2006	First Round (2005, 2006)
Westminster	2	2014, 2015	0–2 (.000)	2014	2015	First Round (2014, 2015)
Chico State	1	2003	0–1 (.000)	2003	2003	First Round (2003)
Clemson	1	2022	2–1 (.667)	2022	2022	Semifinals (2022)
LSU	1	2019	0–1 (.000)	2019	2019	First Round (2019)
MSU-Mankato	1	2000	0–1 (.000)	2000	2000	First Round (2000)
Missouri	1	2004	0–1 (.000)	2004	2004	First Round (2004)
Pittsburgh	1	2012	0–1 (.000)	2012	2012	First Round (2012)
Rhode Island	1	2001	0–1 (.000)	2001	2001	First Round (2001)
Santa Clara	1	2019	0–1 (.000)	2019	2019	First Round (2019)
Texas Christian	1	2022	0–1 (.000)	2022	2022	First Round (2022)
Texas Tech	1	2005	0–1 (.000)	2005	2005	First Round (2005)
Trinity (TX)	1	1998	0–1 (.000)	1998	1998	Quarterfinals (1998)
USC	1	2022	1–1 (.500)	2022	2022	Quarterfinals (2022)
Washington	1	2002	0–1 (.000)	2002	2002	First Round (2002)
Washington St. Louis	1	2003	0–1 (.000)	2003	2003	First Round (2003)

== See also ==
- MCLA Division II Championship appearances by school
